= Enfield Town branch line =

The Enfield Town branch is a branch of the Lea Valley Lines, running from Enfield Town to the West Anglia Main Line at Hackney Downs. It is a combination of the original Enfield branch built by the Eastern Counties Railway (ECR) in 1849 and a later line built by the Great Eastern Railway (GER) from Hackney Downs to Edmonton in 1872. The line is currently a double-tracked suburban railway with services running between Liverpool Street station and Enfield Town as well as services running from Liverpool Street to Cheshunt via the Southbury Loop. Part of the original branch is closed and little visible remains today.

== Early history (1849–1862) ==
Enfield and Edmonton Railway Act 1846
- Act of Parliament
- Parliament of the United Kingdom
- Long title: An Act for making a Railway from the Northern and Eastern Counties Railway at Edmonton to the Town of Enfield in the County of Middlesex.
- Citation: 9 & 10 Vict. c. ccclvii

Dates
- Royal assent: 7 August 1846
Other legislation
| Repealed by | Great Eastern Railway Act 1862 |

Status: Repealed

Text of statute as originally enacted

Enfield had been missed by the Northern and Eastern Railway line which had opened between Stratford and Broxbourne on 15 September 1840 and had to make do with Ponders End station some two miles away. Local pressure led to the deposit of a bill before Parliament in 1844 which failed. Two years later the Enfield and Edmonton Railway Act 1846 (9 & 10 Vict. c. ccclvii) was passed with arrangements for the Eastern Counties Railway to take over management of the project. (Note: The Northern and Eastern had at this time been leased to the ECR.)

Work on the 3 mile 7 chain single line branch commenced in 1848 under the direction of contractor Thomas Earle. The main engineer was Henry Lawford and the project cost approximately £40,000. At Enfield the line terminated at a crossroads in central Enfield. This line branched off the Eastern Counties Railway (ECR) line at Angel Road railway station which was then named Edmonton. After the branch opened on 1 March 1849 the original station was renamed Water lane and the new intermediate station on the branch was named Edmonton. The ECR at that point ran between London Shoreditch (Bishopsgate) and Bishops Stortford although plans were afoot to extend northwards to Cambridge.

By the 1860s the railways in East Anglia were in financial trouble, and most were leased to the Eastern Counties Railway. Although they wished to amalgamate formally, they could not obtain government agreement for this until 1862, when the Great Eastern Railway (GER) was formed by amalgamation.

== Great Eastern Railway (1862–1922) ==
Agitation for a more direct route to Liverpool Street led the GER to deposit the Great Eastern Railway (Metropolitan Station and Railways) Act 1864 (27 & 28 Vict. c. cccxiii) before Parliament. This proposed a double-track line between Hackney Downs to a junction just west of Lower Edmonton Low level station (then called Edmonton). Due to the GER's financial difficulties in the late 1860s the line was not started until 1870.

On 27 May 1872 the double-track line from Hackney Downs opened as far as Stoke Newington followed to Edmonton on 22 July and finally being linked to the existing branch at Edmonton Junction on 1 August. The line between the new junction and Enfield Town was also doubled providing a double-tracked route to Liverpool Street. This offered a quicker journey time into London Liverpool Street and this effectively became the Enfield Town branch.

The original route thence declined in importance from this date and was generally used as a diversionary route with a limited passenger service.

In 1878 the Palace Gates branch opened with a junction at Seven Sisters station. This was linked to the Tottenham and Hampstead line which passed over the branch just south of Seven Sisters on 1 January 1880. On 1 November that year Bush Hill Park railway station opened.

On 1 October 1891 a new line from Bury Street Junction, north of Edmonton Green, to Cheshunt was opened and this line was known as the Churchbury loop. Unfortunately it was not very successful and by 1909 passenger services had been withdrawn. Goods services did continue during this period as there were a number of factories along the route.

The railway contributed to an increase in the local population. The table below shows the growth of Edmonton's population.

| Year | Population |
|---|---|
| 1872 | 14,000 |
| 1881 | 23,463 |
| 1901 | 62,000 |

In 1899 loadings on the workmen's trains that now operated from Lower Edmonton saw a second platform added. However, after 1919 traffic started to drop off due to bus and tram competition.

On the route via Stoke Newington peak hour loadings were very high. Although they looked at electrification, the GER ever on the look out for a cheap solution, opted for a high frequency steam operated passenger service known as the Jazz Service. This started on 12 July 1920 and offered 12 trains to Seven Sisters where three then served the Palace Gates branch and the other nine continued to Enfield Town. (Note: The Jazz service served all suburban lines out of Liverpool Street not just the Enfield Town line.)

== London and North Eastern Railway (1923–1947) ==
In 1925 passenger services were formed of newer Quint Art sets designed by Nigel Gresley.

Work patterns were changing however with new industries being established along the Lea Valley a few miles to the east saw a reduction in the numbers using the branch.

In 1932 the opening of the Piccadilly line saw the loss of passengers from the branch. Two years later the signalling was renewed with the manual signals being replaced by three or four aspect colour light signals. Seven Sisters however was not changed at this time.

During this the 1930s the service were heavily used in the peak hours but lightly used in the off peak and on Sundays.

In 1939 Edmonton Low Level station closed to passengers although the line remained open for goods and occasional diversions. On the newer part of the branch services were reduced as a wartime economy measure.

== British Railways (1948–1994) ==
On nationalisation in 1947 the Enfield Town branch became part of British Railways Eastern Region.

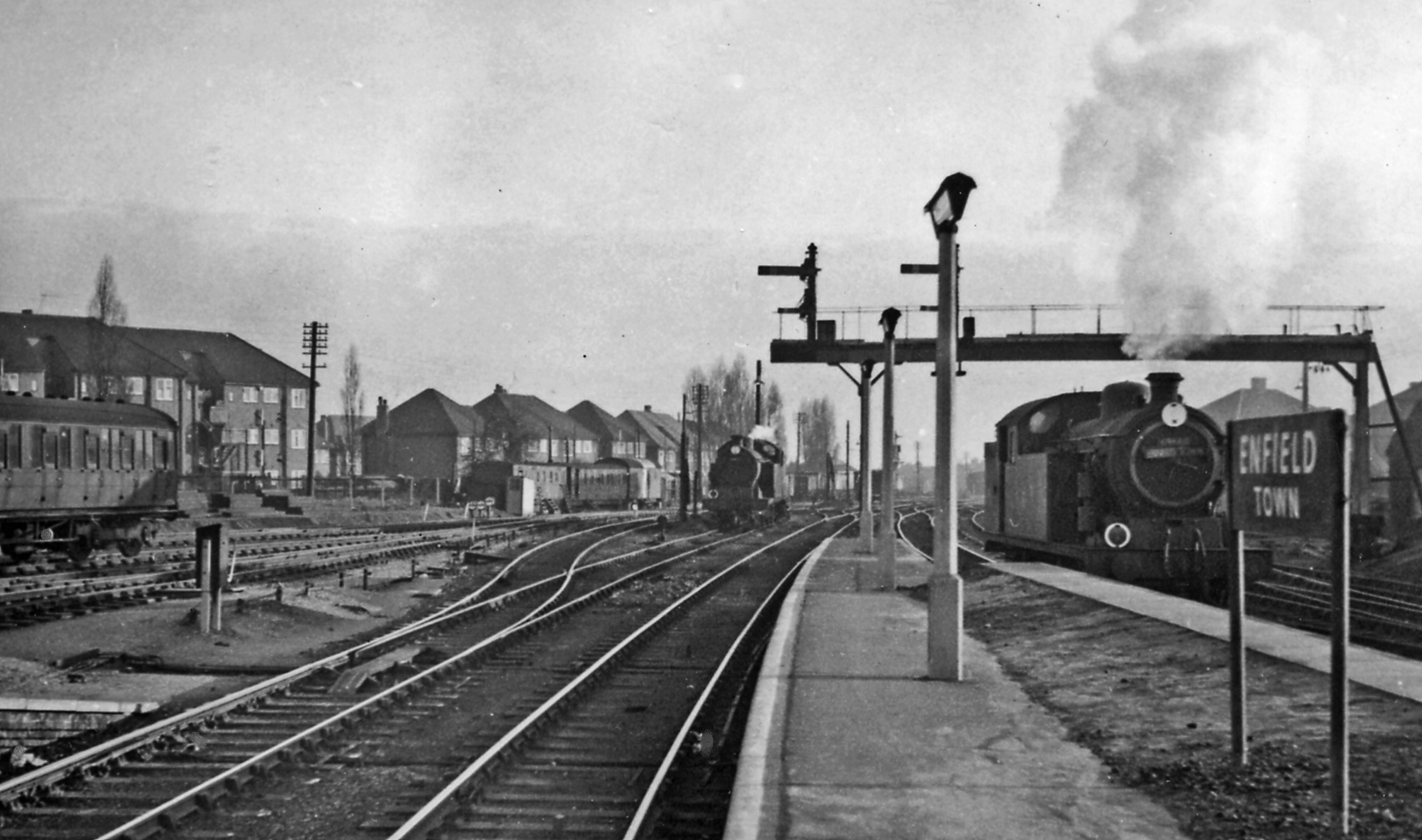
Enfield Town station in 1957 with an N7 locomotive

During 1959 Lower Edmonton (low level) railway station was temporarily re-opened and the line used for services which had been diverted due to electrification works. The final steam services ran on 21 November 1960 and operation was passed over to EMUs. Regular services from Liverpool to Cheshunt via the Southbury loop also started operating from this time.

The Palace Gates line was closed to passengers on 7 January 1963 although goods services continued to run until 5 October 1964. At the end of the year the line through Lower Edmonton (low level) railway station was closed with track being lifted in 1965. Use of the line fell in the 1960s and 1970s in line with increased car ownership. The Victoria line opened on 1 September 1968 to Highbury and Islington and to Warren Street on 1 December 1968.

When Sectorisation was introduced in the 1980s, the station was served by Network SouthEast until the Privatisation of British Railways.

On privatisation in 1994 operation of the station was initially allocated to a business unit which succeeded the old British Railways structure before being taken over by West Anglia Great Northern (WAGN) in January 1997.

== The privatisation era (1994–present) ==
Privatisation saw the railway split into two parts with Railtrack being responsible for the maintenance of the infrastructure and a series of different companies operating the services.

However, before the franchises were let operation was in the hands of independent business units.

The first of the private sector operators was West Anglia Great Northern (WAGN) which operated suburban services on the West Anglia Main Line and associated branches. It also operated the suburban services out of Kings Cross and Moorgate stations and its rolling stock was maintained at Hornsey and Ilford depots. It commenced operation in January 1997.

On 3 October 2002 Railtrack was bought by Network Rail who became responsible for the infrastructure on the branch.

WAGN operated the Enfield branch from January 1997 until 2004 when the Strategic Rail Authority made changes to the franchise arrangements and the line became part of the Greater Anglia franchise which covered the whole of East Anglia. The new franchise was named the "one" franchise by successful bidder National Express.

The "one" franchise was renamed National Express East Anglia and continued operation of the branch until 2012. Operation then passed to the Abellio Greater Anglia franchise.

Operation of the branch transferred from Abellio Greater Anglia to London Overground Rail Operations on 31 May 2015 and Arriva Rail London on 13 November 2016.

== Passenger services ==
The 1850 Bradshaw's Guide showed weekdays departures from Enfield at 7:55 a.m. (to Bishopsgate) 9:15 a.m. (to Bishopsgate) 11:45 a.m. (Edmonton and Water Lane only) 1:25 p.m.(Edmonton and Water Lane only) 3:30 p.m.(to Bishopsgate) 6:15 p.m./7:15 p.m./9:15 p.m. (all Edmonton and Water Lane only). Trains that terminated at Water Lane connected with up services to Bishopsgate.

By 1864 there were 14 trains daily between Enfield and Bishopsgate. In 1872 there was a half-hourly service to Bishopsgate Low Level station. Frequency could not be increased until the west side of Liverpool Street was opened on 2 February 1874.

Travelling by rail on the Enfield Line could be at this time could be entertaining. In his book London's Local Railways, Alan Jackson records

"..third class passengers got hard sprung seats covered with American cloth backed by partitions open above luggage rack level. This last feature was much exploited by itinerant musicians playing mouth organs, concertinas or merely giving voice. In an atmosphere of cheap shag (tobacco) and inadequately washed bodies, men of character also attempted to conduct hymn singing and prayers over the top of the partitions although these were by no means universally appreciated".

On 1 October 1909 services via the Southbury loop were withdrawn, but were reinstated for munitions workers between 1 March 1915 and 1 July 1919.

In July 1922 weekday services using the branch are summarised as follows:

Enfield Town–Liverpool Street: – The off peak service ran every ten minutes from Liverpool Street with two different calling patterns for every other train. One of these called all stations to Enfield Town with a connection at Seven Sisters for the Palace Gates branch. The other service was fast to Stoke Newington and then called all stations. In the opposite direction departures from Enfield were not as even due to the calling patterns. In the peak hours additional trains run with some not calling at the smaller stations.

Palace Gates branch: – In addition to the regular shuttle services between Seven Sisters and Palace Gates a number of services ran at irregular intervals from the branch to Seven Sisters and thence via South Tottenham and Stratford Low Level to North Woolwich. A number of direct services ran to/from Liverpool Street in the peaks.

Lower Edmonton: – the station on the single section of the old branch had one service in the morning peak at 7:18 a.m. which was direct to Liverpool Street. This was a workmen's train. The evening peak return working was a normal service train routed via Stratford which departed Liverpool street at 5:17 p.m.

In 1960 train services were restored to stations on the Southbury loop.

In the May 2015 timetable, weekday services on the branch can be found on table 21. The general pattern from Liverpool Street is a half-hourly all stations service to Enfield Town and a half-hourly service to Cheshunt (also all stations) with additional peak hour services. Journey time from Enfield Town to Liverpool Street is around 33 minutes.

The Saturday and Sunday services are based around the weekday off peak pattern.

One early morning service between Liverpool Street and Enfield Town is routed via Stratford, the Gospel Oak to Barking line and Seven Sisters.

== Goods traffic ==
The majority of goods services on the branch would have originated from Temple Mills Yard (near Stratford) or Park Yard (adjacent to Northumberland Park railway station) and been routed via Lower Edmonton or South Tottenham.

Freight facilities were provided at Manor Road sidings (west side of the line between Stoke Newington and Stamford Hill stations), at White Hart Lane, Edmonton (between the old and new branches), Bush Hill Park and Enfield.

There were private sidings north of Seven Sisters serving a lager brewery and ice factory in 1882 being used later by Tottenham Council. On 14 September 1960 freight was withdrawn from Enfield Town (presumably a number of coal trains found their way to Enfield until the engine shed closed in November). In May 1964 Bush Hill Park closed followed by Manor Road Sidings, Stoke Newington and Edmonton in December. White Hart Lane closed to general traffic in January 1968 but remained open for solid fuel until 2 July 1977.

In the May 2014 freight working timetable (Book LD01), one service (6X36 1952 Hoo Junction to Whitemoor) is booked to use the branch between Seven Sisters and Bury Street Junction along with a small number of track machine and light engine moves. (Note: The May 2014 timetable can be found on line and may not be in printed format. There is also a chance that it will not remain available once the validity of the timetable runs out.http://www.networkrail.co.uk/browse%20documents/timetables/working%20timetable%20(wtt)/2%20-%20may%202014%20%20-%20dec%202014/LD/LD01.pdf)

== Locomotives ==
In the early years of the line operation was by a steam rail motor called Enfield. This locomotive was a 2-2-0 locomotive and 36 seat four compartment coach on one frame. It was built by William Bridges Adams in 1849 at Fairfield Works, Bow.

Passenger operation was almost exclusively in the hands of tank engines with tender engines handling goods traffic.

Typical classes that operated the line were:

The 'No. 134 Class' 0-4-4T were built in 1872-1873 specifically at the time Liverpool street opened and more suburban services were being operated by the GER. Construction of the thirty engines was divided equally between Neilson & Co. and the Avonside Engine Co.

The GER Class M15 (LNER class F4/5) was a class of 160 2-4-2T steam locomotives designed by Thomas William Worsdell and built between 1884 and 1909.

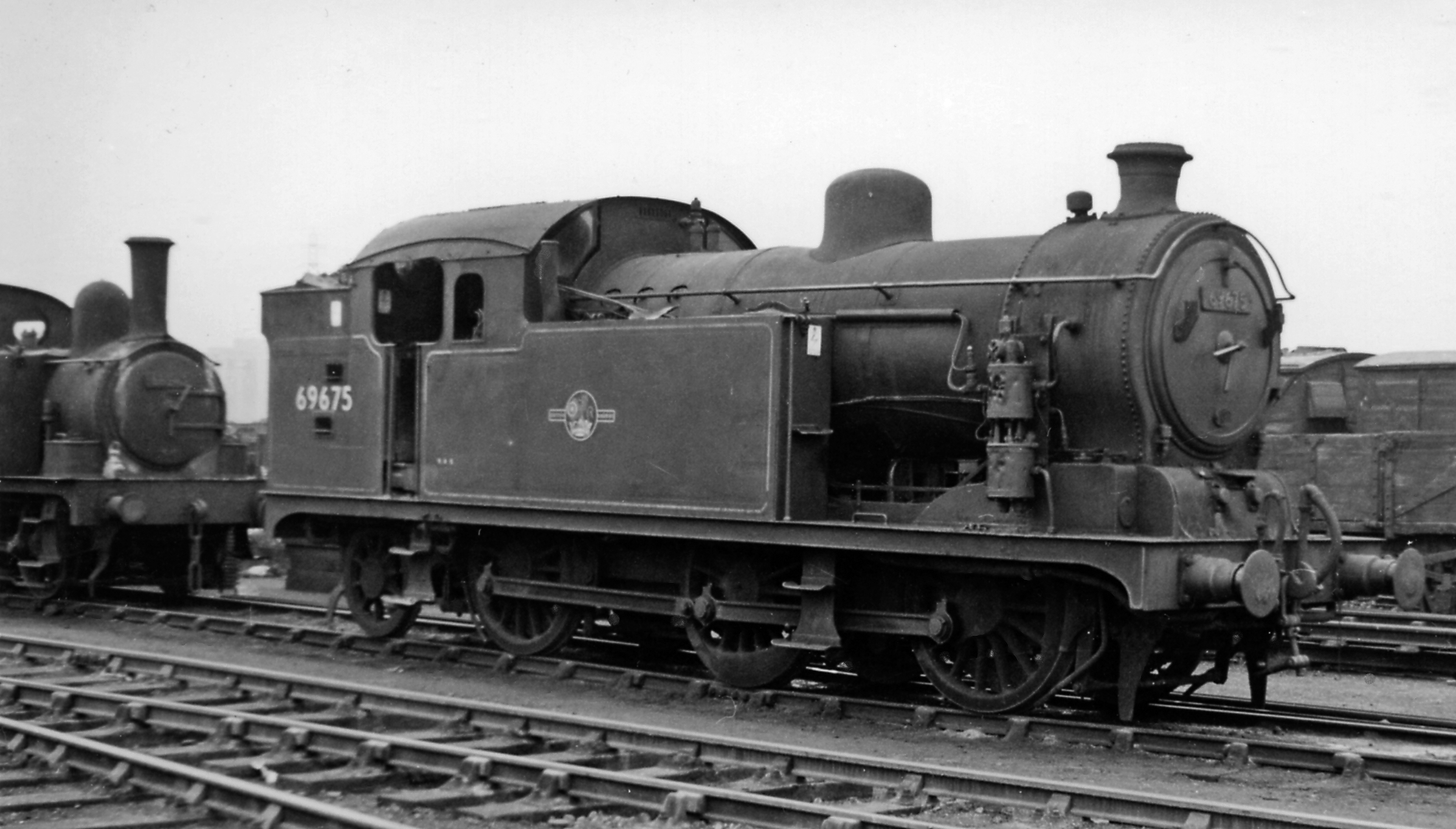
An N7 0-6-2T which was the mainstay of the passenger service for many years

The GER Class R24 was a class of 140 0-6-0 steam tank locomotives designed by James Holden later to become LNER Class J67. A later version of this class the Class S56 numbered 20 locomotives (LNER Class J69).

The GER Class L77 (LNER Class N7) 0-6-2T locomotives were designed by the GER (but most examples were actually built by its successor the London and North Eastern Railway. Designed by Alfred John Hill they were employed on suburban passenger services throughout the North East London area between 1915 and 1962. The first recorded examples on the branch were no 1001 and 1002 in 1922.This class of locomotive operated branch services until the end of steam in November 1960.

Holden designed the GER Class S44(LNER G4) 0-4-4T engines of 1898 with the Chingford and Enfield branches in mind. However increasing train weights by the 1920s saw them displaced to rural duties before withdrawal between 1929 and 1938.

The GER Class Y14 (LNER Class J15) 0-6-0 locomotives were employed on freight trains on the line. Designed by T.W. Worsdell for both freight and passenger duties they were introduced in July 1883 and they were so successful that new batches were built (largely unchanged) to 1913 the final total being 289.

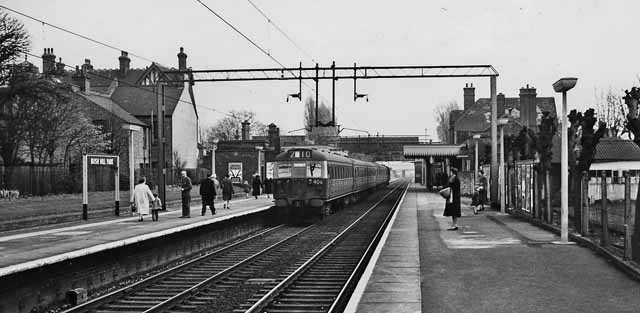
Bush Hill Park Station with a Class 305 EMU – April 1961

Following the 1960 electrification various classes of Electric Multiple Unit (EMU) took over operation of the line (although initial technical problems saw steam still operating services for a short period). These trains were all allocated to Ilford depot situated on the Great Eastern main line.

EMU classes that operated the line included:

- British Rail Class 302
- British Rail Class 305
- British Rail Class 306
- British Rail Class 307
- British Rail Class 308

By the 1980s these units were being withdrawn and replaced by more modern stock. Since then the branch has generally been worked by either British Rail Class 315 or British Rail Class 317 EMUs.

== Carriages ==
All coaching stock that operated the line was either built by the Great Eastern Railway (or its predecessors such as the Eastern Counties Railway) or the London and North Eastern Railway.

From opening until the mid-1920s coaching stock was four wheeled and even as late as 1900 the majority of GER suburban trains were composed of four-wheeler carriages.

Interior design was spartan and around 1900 third-class passengers sat on bare boards five abreast, second-class passengers on cushions also five abreast, while first-class passengers sat four abreast and enjoyed more legroom. In 1899 James Holden produced the first six passengers sat abreast carriages in a 13-carriage, third-class only train (each carriage was 27 feet long and 9 feet wide and had five compartments). This set, which also included such modern features as slam lock doors and gas tail lamps became the model for future suburban carriage design.

The GER made every effort to maximise the capacity of its suburban carriages to deal with the rise in usage. In the early 1900s some four-wheeler carriages were cut in half longitudinally and a section inserted to make them wider in order to increase the capacity. By 1915 A. J. Hill instigated a policy of converting old four-wheel carriages into bogeyed stock and some 500 four-wheeled carriages were converted this way.

== Other facilities ==
Little is known about the earliest engine shed on the line at Enfield Town which existed from 1849 to 1867 other than it could hold two locomotives. The shed was demolished but due to the financial crisis the GER was facing at the time it was not until 1869 that the replacement structure was built. There was a turntable on the site but as all services were worked by tank engines (so did not require turning) this was removed in July 1921.

There was an engine shed located at Enfield Town station which housed a number of tank engines outbased from Stratford engine shed. The shed was a single-track affair and light maintenance was carried out there. When a locomotive required more attention it would be swapped with a similar locomotive from Stratford. For many years locomotives were coaled from a stack of coal on the ground although the addition of a coal siding in the 1950s meant coaling could be carried out direct from the wagons.

The shed closed at the end of 1960 following the cessation of stream services on 21 November 1960 and was demolished soon after.

There were a number of carriage sidings at Enfield Town for overnight stabling.

== Future developments ==
None at present.

== In print ==
Jim Hill was an engine driver who worked the line for many years. His reminiscences can be found in the book Buckjumpers, Gobblers and Clauds : A Lifetime on Great Eastern and LNER Footplates (Bradford Burton 1981 ISBN 0851533965)
