= Turkey Street railway station =

London Overground station

Turkey Street
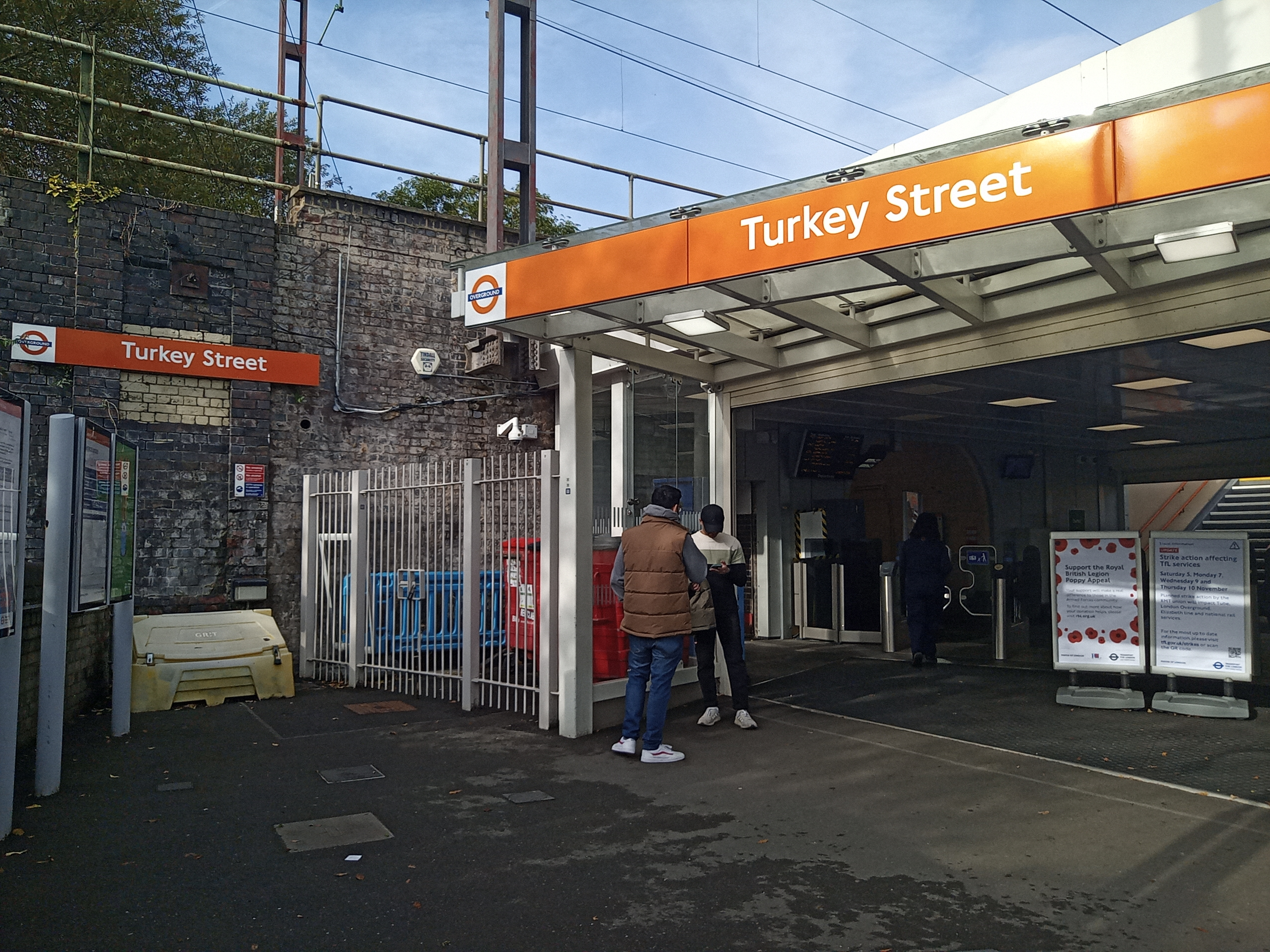
- Turkey Street Station
- Interactive map of Turkey Street

General information
- Location: Enfield
- Local authority: London Borough of Enfield
- Managed by: London Overground
- Owner: Network Rail
- Station code: TUR
- DfT category: E
- Number of platforms: 2
- Fare zone: 6

National Rail annual entry and exit
- 2020–21: ▼0.340 million
- 2021–22: ▲0.686 million
- 2022–23: ▲0.778 million
- 2023–24: ▲1.022 million
- 2024–25: ▼0.991 million

Key dates
- 1 October 1891: Opened as Forty Hill
- 1 October 1909: Closed
- 1 March 1915: Re-opened
- 1 July 1919: Closed
- 21 November 1960: Re-opened as Turkey Street

Other information
- External links: Departures; Facilities
- Coordinates: 51.6726°N 0.0472°W

Turkey Street is a station on the Weaver line of the London Overground, located in the Bullsmoor area to the north of Enfield in north London. It is 12 miles 16 chains (19.6 km) down the line from London Liverpool Street and is situated between Southbury and Theobalds Grove stations on the Southbury Loop section of the Lea Valley lines. It is in London fare zone 6.

== History ==
The railway line from Bury Street Junction, north of the current Edmonton Green station, to Cheshunt was opened by the Great Eastern Railway on 1 October 1891. It was known as the Churchbury Loop.

The district served by the line was still predominantly rural, and the coming of the tram to Waltham Cross in 1904 saw the railway unable to compete. Passenger services ceased on 1 October 1909, but were reinstated for the benefit of munitions workers between 1 March 1915 and 1 July 1919.

After that, the line was served only by freight trains until it was electrified as part of a wider scheme, and Turkey Street station reopened to passengers on 21 November 1960. The line is now known as the Southbury Loop.

The station was opened as Forty Hill and did not gain its current name until 1960. The goods depot at the station closed in 1966.

The current station building was built in the late 1980s. The previous and original station building had a prominent, tall chimney stack for the station master's coal fire, which brought the chimney's top above platform level. The station itself is constructed on an incline, and the ticket office area of the track is raised on an embankment, so the chimney was very prominent. The interior of the original station consisted of a large ticket hall, with the station master's office and serving hatch on the left-hand side of the entrance. A tunnel opposite the entrance led to the stairs to the Cheshunt-bound platform. This tunnel was used in the rebuild. To the right were the stairs to the Liverpool Street platform. The stairwells were also reused during the rebuild, but the concrete steps were replaced with steel ones.

When originally built, the station was on the other side of the railway bridge, and a wide footbridge over the Turkey Brook led directly to the Cheshunt-bound platform. This entrance was disused from the early 1970s onwards, and the former station building was converted to a newsagent and general store; the footbridge was used for storage for the shop, and the entrance to the actual station area had a large iron gate but was bricked up when the station was rebuilt.

The platforms were of standard length and had large, open-fronted waiting areas with concrete walls and felt-covered wooden roofs, and a long single bench along the rear wall. These were demolished when the station was rebuilt.

In the 1980s, the station was served by British Rail Class 305 EMUs going to and from London Liverpool Street and Cheshunt. Around the same time as the rebuild, the 305s were slowly replaced by British Rail Class 315. The Cheshunt service was extended to Hertford East in the late 1980s, utilising the existing main line from Cheshunt to Broxbourne and the existing branch to Hertford East. However, in the late 1990s, the services again ran only as far as Cheshunt.

=== London Overground ===
On 31 May 2015 the station and all services that call here, transferred from Abellio Greater Anglia to London Overground Rail Operations. The station was rebuilt once again in 2017.

== Services ==
All services at Turkey Street are operated as part of the Weaver line of the London Overground using Class 710 EMUs.

The typical off-peak service in trains per hour is:

- 2 tph to London Liverpool Street
- 2 tph to Cheshunt

Preceding station	London Overground	Following station
Southbury towards Liverpool Street	Weaver line Lea Valley lines	Theobalds Grove towards Cheshunt

== Connections ==
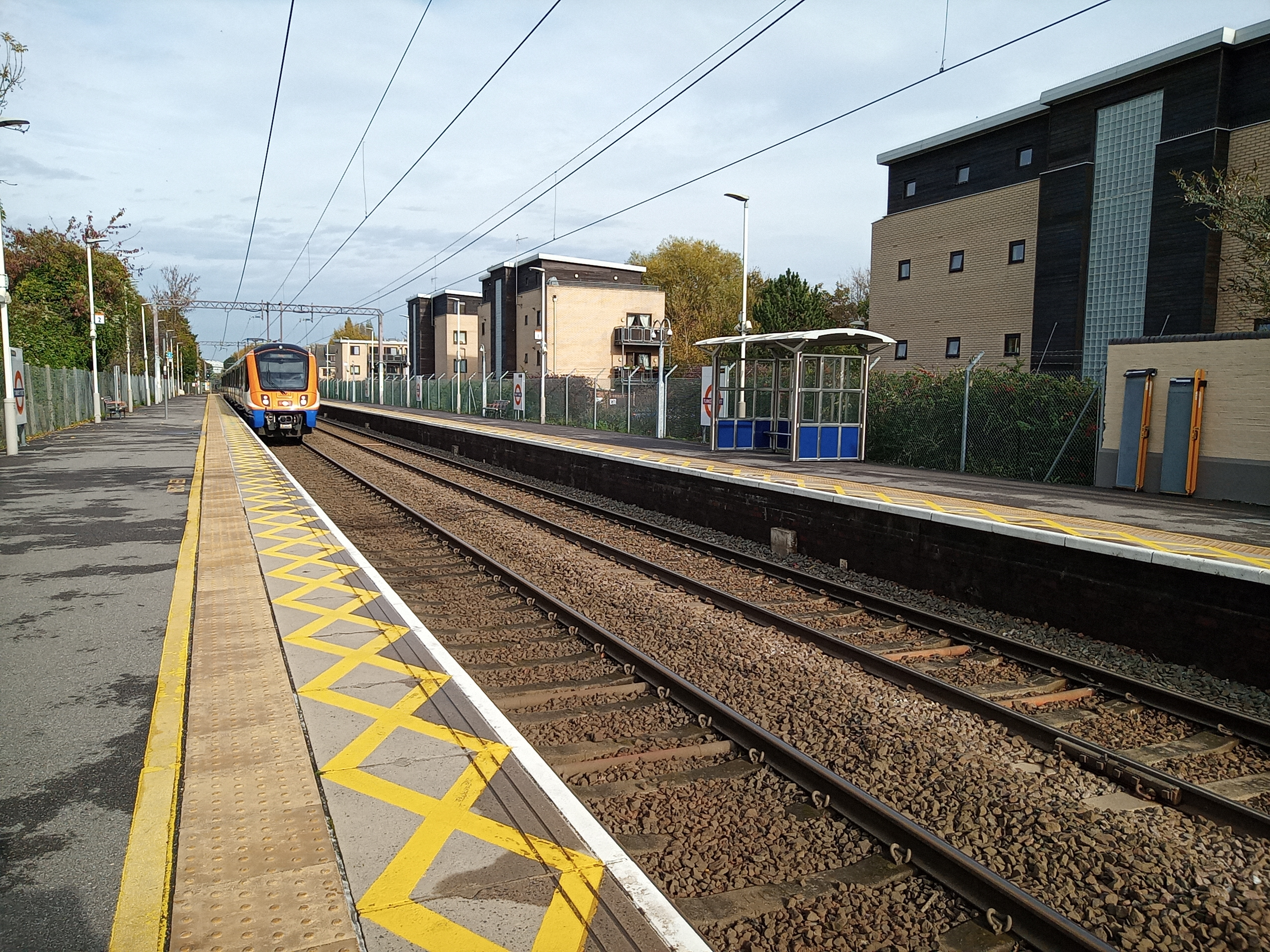
Platforms at Turkey Street

The station is served by two bus stops at opposite ends of Turkey Street. One is served by London Buses routes 217 and 317, school routes 617 and 627, while the other is served by routes 121, 279, and the night bus N279.
