= Southbury railway station =

London Overground station

Southbury
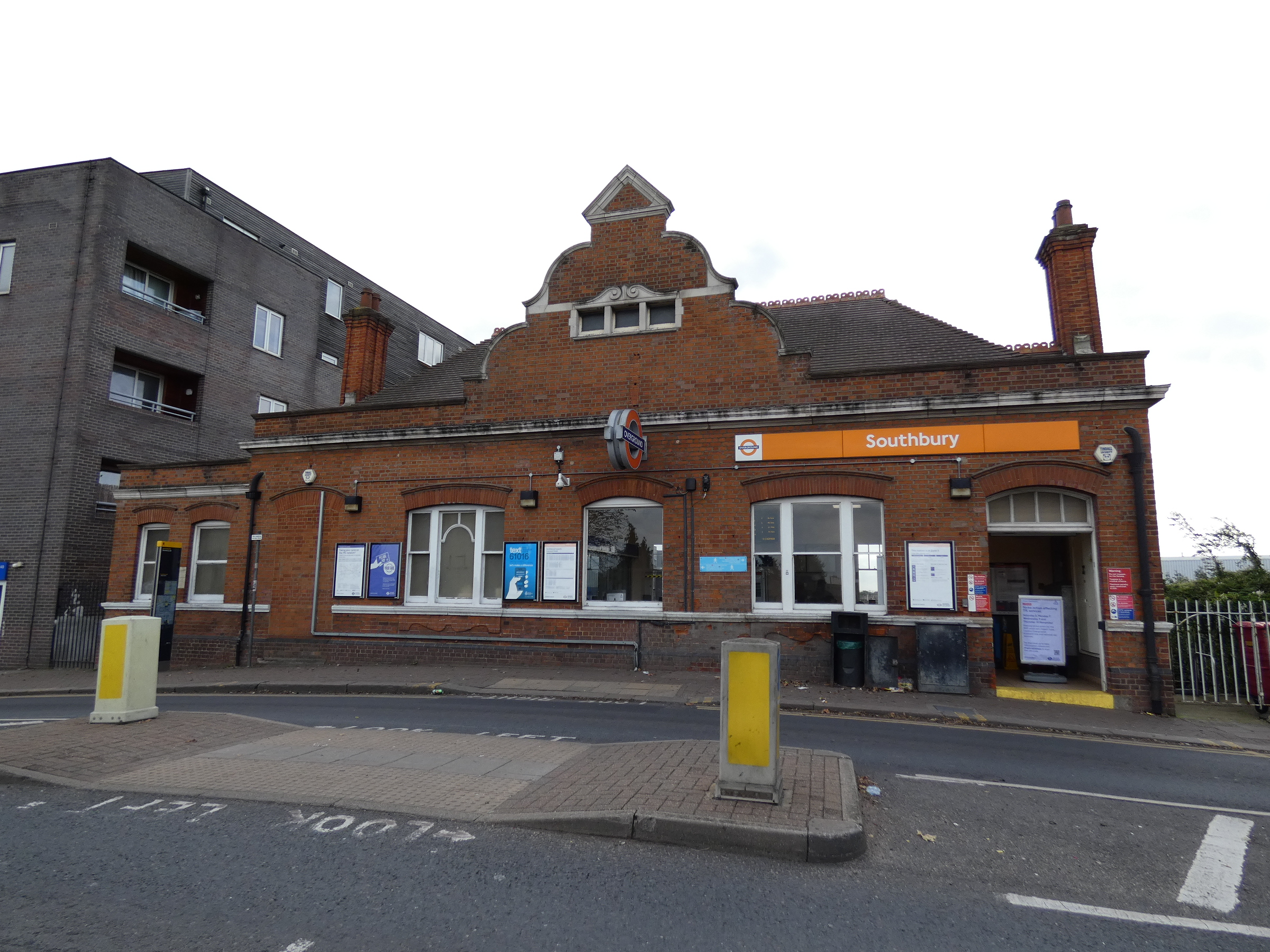
- Interactive map of Southbury

General information
- Location: Enfield
- Local authority: London Borough of Enfield
- Managed by: London Overground
- Owner: Network Rail
- Station code: SBU
- DfT category: E
- Number of platforms: 2
- Fare zone: 5

National Rail annual entry and exit
- 2020–21: ▼0.376 million
- 2021–22: ▲0.729 million
- 2022–23: ▲0.812 million
- 2023–24: ▲1.075 million
- 2024–25: ▼1.039 million

Key dates
- 1 October 1891: Opened as Churchbury
- 1 October 1909: Closed
- 1 March 1915: Re-opened
- 1 July 1919: Closed
- 21 November 1960: Re-opened as Southbury

Other information
- External links: Departures; Facilities
- Coordinates: 51.6484°N 0.0530°W

Southbury is a station on the Weaver line of the London Overground, located on the eastern side of Enfield in north London. It is 10 miles 32 chains (16.7 km) down the line from London Liverpool Street and is situated between Edmonton Green and Turkey Street stations on the Southbury Loop section of the Lea Valley lines. The station is in London fare zone 5.

== History ==
The line from Bury Street Junction, north of Edmonton Green station, to Cheshunt was opened by the Great Eastern Railway on 1 October 1891 when this station opened with the name Churchbury. The line was known as the Churchbury Loop.

The district was still predominantly rural, and the coming of the tram to Waltham Cross in 1904 saw the railway unable to compete. Passenger services ceased on 1 October 1909, but were reinstated for munitions workers between 1 March 1915 and 1 July 1919.

After that the line was used only by goods trains until it was electrified as part of a wider scheme, and the station reopened as Southbury on 21 November 1960. The line is now known as the Southbury Loop. The goods yard closed in 1970.

On 31 May 2015, the station and all services that call transferred from Abellio Greater Anglia to London Overground Rail Operations.

== Services ==
All services at Southbury are operated as part of the Weaver line of the London Overground using Class 710 EMUs.

The typical off-peak service in trains per hour is:

- 2 tph to London Liverpool Street
- 2 tph to Cheshunt

Preceding station	London Overground	Following station
Edmonton Green towards Liverpool Street	Weaver line Lea Valley lines	Turkey Street towards Cheshunt

== Connections ==
London Buses routes 121, 191, 307 and 313 serve the station.
