= Southbury Loop =

Railway line in the UK

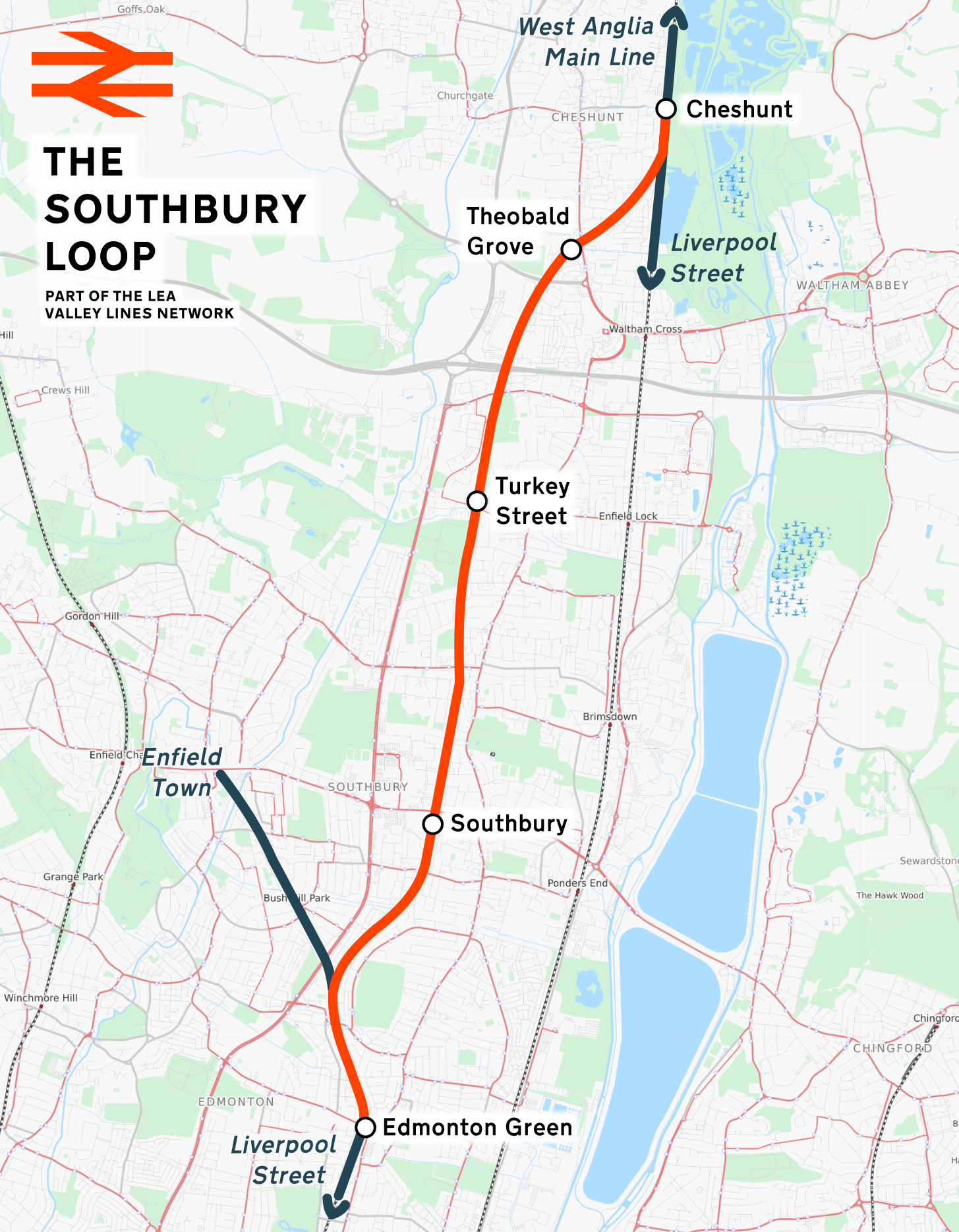
Map of the Southbury Loop

The Southbury Loop (formerly known as the Churchbury loop) is a line linking Edmonton Green, in north-east London, with Cheshunt. It was opened by the Great Eastern Railway in 1891. Initially, it was not very successful and was closed to passenger traffic in 1909. Goods trains continued to use the line and during World War I passenger services were reinstated for munitions workers. Once the war finished the line returned to its goods-only status although it was occasionally used for diversionary purposes when the West Anglia Main Line was closed south of Cheshunt. Electrification of the line and the reintroduction of passenger services in 1960 saw the line become busy with regular suburban services as part of the Lea Valley Lines network. Since May 2015 passenger services on the line have been part of London Overground's Weaver Line

== History ==
=== Opening and early years (1891-1923) ===
The Great Eastern Railway (GER) had first considered the loop line in the 1860s as part of the suburban expansion plan. The opening of the Enfield Town branch had helped Enfield and Tottenham to grow, so the GER applied for an "Additional Powers Act" to construct a branch that would leave the Bethnal Green to Edmonton line (which is now known as the line via Seven Sisters) and join the main line close to Enfield Lock. However, these proposals were abandoned in 1869. The powers were revived through another Act of Parliament in 1882 to open up housing development in the area, this time with the main line connection at Cheshunt. It took another seven years before construction started in 1889. The contract, worth £94,322, was awarded to Walter Scott and Co. of Newcastle-under-Tyne.

The line was opened on 1 October 1891 as the Churchbury Loop. It ran from Bury Street Junction, north of Lower Edmonton High Level, to Cheshunt. The line was 5 miles and 75 chains long with stations at Churchbury, Forty Hill and Theobalds Grove. Although construction costs were relatively low, the GER provided well-built stations in anticipation of the business these stations were expected to generate. Goods yards were provided at Churchbury and Forty Hill; there was also a siding serving a brickworks located close to the former.

On 4 July 1899, permission was granted by the Board of Trade for a goods yard at Theobalds Grove, which was built and opened by the end of that year.

Despite the efforts, the district remained predominantly rural in nature. The introduction of a tram service to Waltham Cross in 1908 made it difficult for the railway to compete, leading to a 50% decrease in passenger numbers. The line was not helped by the fact that few trains ran through to Liverpool Street, while most terminated at White Hart Lane.

Passenger services were withdrawn on 1 October 1909, and the then president of the Board of trade, Winston Churchill, had to answer a question on the subject in the House of Commons as a railway closure was, at that point, a rare occurrence.

During World War I, the Lea Valley became a hub for the production of munitions, and as a result, the government called on the GER to reinstate passenger services. On 1 March 1915 the service began operating, with trains stopping at the original stations and from 4 July 1916 (or 12 June 1916, depending on the source) a purpose-built wooden halt called Carterhatch Lane Halt. However, demand for the service declined again after the war ended, leading to the withdrawal of services again on 1 July 1919.

=== London and North Eastern Railway (1923-1947) ===
Following the 1923 grouping the line was operated by the London & North Eastern Railway (LNER).

House building commenced in the area during the early 1920s, after the A10 road was constructed. However, the LNER board showed no interest in reopening the line for passenger traffic. (Note: Although it is possible that the decision was driven by concerns about the capacity of the line in the Hackney Downs area.)

During this period the down line (from London) was used by goods trains whilst the up line (to London) was used for wagon storage.

The line was used for diversionary purposes on a number of occasions, especially during World War II, when enemy action made the main line unusable or when it was flooded by the River Lea.

On 2 January 1945, Theobalds Grove station was damaged by a V2 rocket which exploded close by.

=== British Railways (1948-1994) ===
On nationalisation responsibility for operating the line fell to the Eastern Region of British Railways.

Operations continued in a similar fashion, but as more new housing was being built locally, plans were made to electrify the line and reopen it for passenger services, an idea first proposed as early as 1944. The site of Carterhatch Lane Halt was used as the electrification depot for both this line and the electrification of the wider area. The line was upgraded with colour light signalling which replaced the older mechanical signalling that dated back to the opening of the line. The signalling was commissioned on 3 July 1960 and passenger services began on 21 November 1960. As a consequence of the renaming of Churchbury station to Southbury, the line became known as the Southbury Loop. Additionally, the former Forty Hill station was renamed Turkey Street as part of the re-launch.

The goods yards at Theobalds Grove and Southbury were closed in 1966 and 1970 respectively.

When sectorisation was introduced in the 1980s, the line was served by Network SouthEast until the privatisation of British Rail.

=== The privatisation era (1994 - present day) ===
The Railways Act 1993 split the railway into two parts with Railtrack being responsible for the maintenance of the infrastructure and a series of different companies operating the services.

However, before the franchises were let operation was in the hands of independent business units.

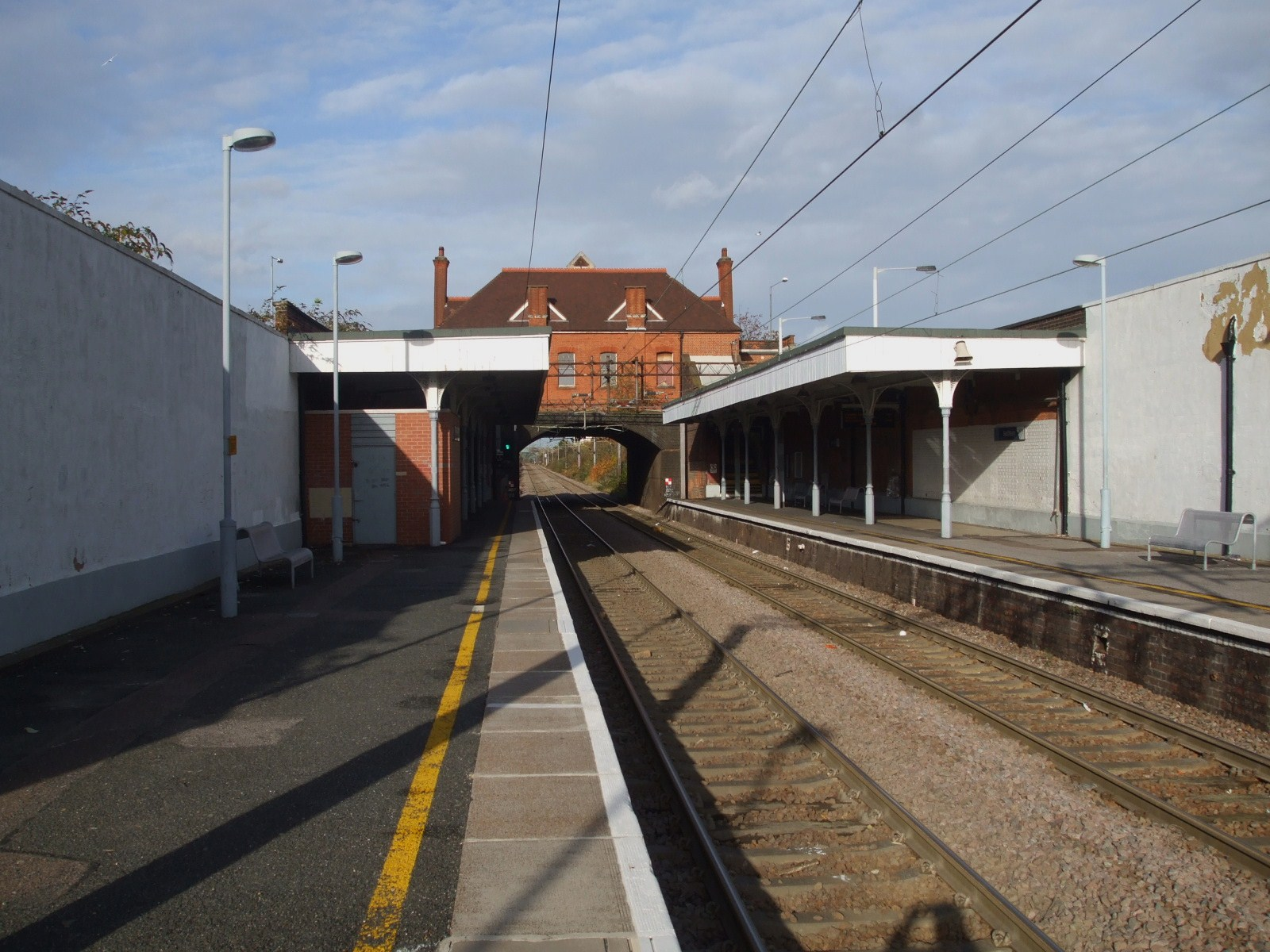
Southbury station looking north in 2008

The first of the private sector operators was the West Anglia Great Northern (WAGN) Railway which operated suburban services on the West Anglia Main Line and associated branches. It also operated suburban services out of Kings Cross and Moorgate stations, and its rolling stock was maintained at Hornsey and Ilford depots. It commenced operation in January 1997.

On 3 October 2002 Railtrack was bought by Network Rail, which became responsible for the infrastructure on the branch.

WAGN operated the Southbury Loop from January 1997 until 2004, when the UK Strategic Rail Authority made changes to the franchise arrangements. Therefore, the line became part of the Greater Anglia franchise, which covered the whole of East Anglia. The new franchise was named the "one" franchise by successful bidder National Express.

The single franchise was renamed National Express East Anglia and continued operation of the branch until 2012. Operation then passed to the Abellio Greater Anglia franchise. However, on 31 May 2015, the suburban Liverpool Street - Cheshunt service was transferred to London Overground; a few peak services run by Abellio Greater Anglia between Liverpool Street and Hertford East or Broxbourne still continued to use the line. This however ceased in May 2023 when Greater Anglia decided to run all its Hertford East peak time trains via Tottenham Hale.

== Passenger services ==
In the early years the loop had a good service, although few trains outside peak hours ran to Liverpool Street. Most trains terminated at White Hart Lane, which necessitated a change of trains, and it was probably this factor that helped to stifle passenger numbers.

During World War I, a shuttle service was operated between the Low Level station at Lower Edmonton and the loop. Passengers had to change to the virtually adjacent High Level station (renamed Edmonton Green in 1992) to continue their journey.

In the May 1964 timetable the loop services worked fast from Liverpool Street to Edmonton Green, then called at all stations to Broxbourne, where the trains (formed of two electric multiple units) split, with one half going to Hertford East and the other to Bishop's Stortford (then the limit of electrification on the West Anglia Main Line).

With the opening of the Victoria line in 1968, services started calling at the interchange station at Seven Sisters.

Since then various permutations of the timetable have been tried. From May 2015, a half-hourly service (Table 21) from Cheshunt called at all stations to Liverpool Street.

== Goods services ==
The majority of goods services on the branch would have originated from Temple Mills yard (near Stratford) or Park Yard (adjacent to Northumberland Park railway station) and been routed via Lower Edmonton or South Tottenham. Inward traffic would have included coal and building materials.

In the early years market produce was sent out along with bricks, and as the area became more industrialised some factories sent out goods via this route. The First World War generated additional munitions traffic between 1915 and 1918.

By 1970 there were no goods facilities on the loop.

In the May 2014 freight working timetable (Book LD01) one service (6X36 1952 Hoo Junction to Whitemoor) was booked to use the branch between Seven Sisters and Bury Street Junction along with a small number of track machine and light engine moves. (Note: The May 2014 timetable can be found online and may not be in printed format. There is also a chance that it will not remain available once the validity of the timetable runs out.http://www.networkrail.co.uk/browse%20documents/timetables/working%20timetable%20(wtt)/2%20-%20may%202014%20%20-%20dec%202014/LD/LD01.pdf)

== Locomotives ==
Between the opening in 1891 and the first closure in 1909, trains were operated by small tank locomotives such as the Class R24 (LNER Class J67) 0-6-0T.

During World War I the auto-train service was worked by the Class Y65 (LNER Class F7) 2-4-2T.

Local goods services were typically worked by the Class Y14 (LNER Class J15) and Class G58 (LNER Class J17) 0-6-0 locomotives in the GER, LNER and the early BR years.

Nearly all the locomotives which covered duties in this area were allocated to Stratford engine shed.

== Carriages and multiple units ==
During the re-opening in the First World War the line was operated by a two-car autotrain.

After electrification EMU classes that operated the line included:

- British Rail Class 302
- British Rail Class 305
- British Rail Class 306
- British Rail Class 307
- British Rail Class 308

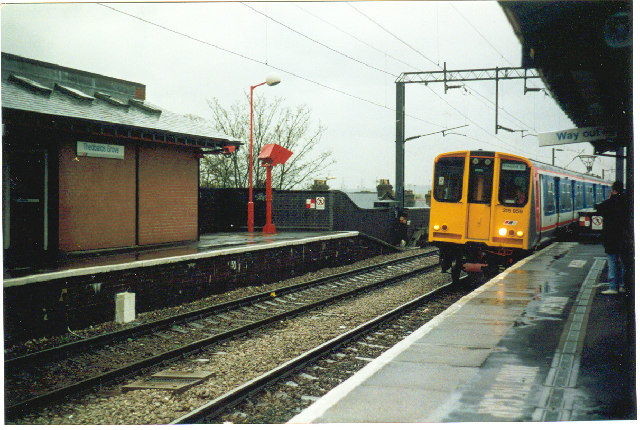
Theobalds Grove Railway Station with a Class 315 on a local service

By the 1980s these units were being withdrawn and replaced by more modern stock. Since then the branch has generally been worked by either Class 315 or Class 317 EMUs. From 2020 the 315s and 317s were replaced by new Class 710 units.
