= Weaver line =

Railway service in London, England

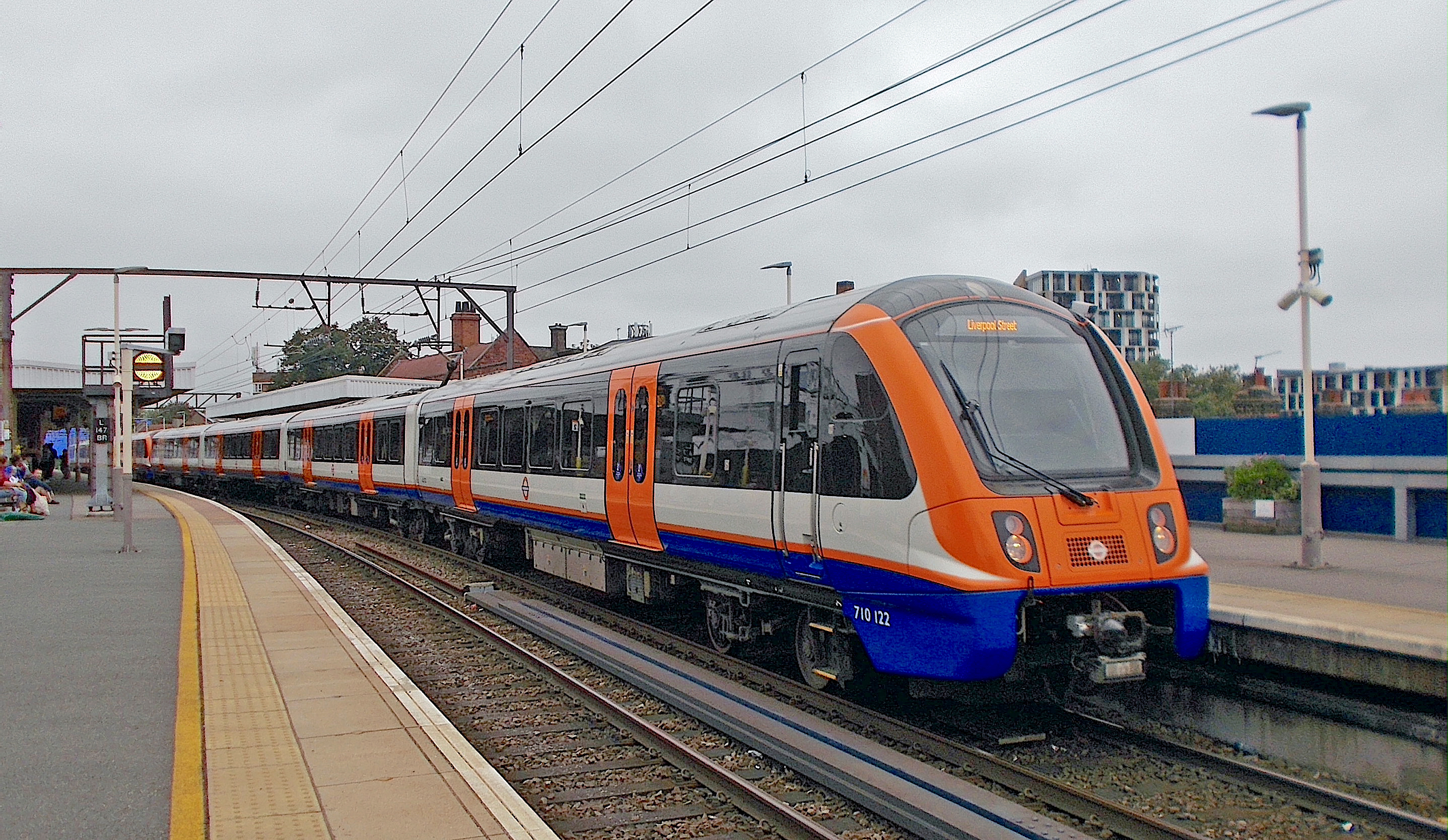
- London Overground Class 710 at Hackney Downs

Overview
- Status: Operational
- Owner: Network Rail
- Locale: Greater London; East of England
- Termini: Enfield Town; Cheshunt; Chingford; London Liverpool Street
- Stations: 25

Service
- Type: Suburban rail
- System: National Rail
- Services: 3
- Operator: London Overground
- Depot: Ilford
- Rolling stock: Class 710 "Aventra"

Technical
- Num of tracks: 2–4
- Track gauge: 1,435 mm (4 ft 8 1/2 in) standard gauge
- Electrification: 25 kV 50 Hz AC Overhead lines
- Operating speed: 40–50 mph (64–80 km/h)

The Weaver line is the service operated by London Overground on the Lea Valley Lines between Liverpool Street and Cheshunt, Chingford, and Enfield Town. These routes were transferred from Greater Anglia to London Overground on 31 May 2015. All other Lea Valley services, including suburban services from Liverpool Street and Stratford via Tottenham Hale, remain with Greater Anglia.

Since 2020, trains have been operated by new-built British Rail Class 710 rolling stock, replacing older Class 315 and Class 317 stock inherited from Greater Anglia.

The 'Weaver line' branding was introduced in February 2024 by Mayor of London Sadiq Khan and his Commission for Diversity in the Public Realm to honour "areas of London known for their textile trade, shaped over the centuries by diverse migrant communities and individuals". In 2015, Transport for London had proposed the name 'Lea Valley line'.

== History ==
The first branch of the Weaver line towards Enfield was reached on 1 March 1849 by the single-track Enfield Town branch from the N&ER at Angel Road via Lower Edmonton. A shorter route to Edmonton was provided by the GER in 1872, from Bethnal Green via Hackney Downs and Stoke Newington, which opened on 27 May; the section via Seven Sisters and Lower Edmonton, at a new high-level station provided adjacent to the old low-level station, opened on 22 July. The line from there to Enfield was doubled at the same time.

Another branch, the Chingford branch line, was a branch from Lea Bridge to Walthamstow, Shern Hall Street, in 1870, extended southwards to Hackney Downs in 1872 and then northwards to Chingford in 1873.

The last section linked Lower Edmonton on the Enfield branch via Churchbury (later Southbury) with the Broxbourne line at Cheshunt, opening on 1 October 1891; it was known as the Churchbury loop until the renaming of that station in 1960, then the Southbury loop.

A station was proposed near Clapton called Queens Road but never opened.

Electrification of the lines were completed in 1960, initially at 6250 V 50 Hz and converted to 25 kV 50 Hz from 1976–1988 (details at Great Eastern Main Line § Electrification).

=== Naming of London Overground service ===
In 2021, Sadiq Khan announced that if re-elected as Mayor of London, he would give the six services operated by London Overground unique names that would reflect London's diversity, working with his Commission for Diversity in the Public Realm. This included services between Liverpool Street and Enfield Town, Cheshunt, and Chingford, which were transferred from Greater Anglia to London Overground in 2015.

The name proposed for this service in 2015 was the 'Lea Valley line', the established name used for the lines on which this service operates. On 25 August 2023, TFL announced that it would be giving each of the six Overground services unique names by the end of the following year. On 15 February 2024, it was confirmed that the Lea Valley section would be named the 'Weaver line' and would be coloured maroon on the updated network map.

The weaving and textile industry (colloquially "the rag trade") was a major employer in the East End districts (such as Shoreditch, Spitalfields, Haggerston, Hackney and Bethnal Green) close to the Liverpool Street terminus. Walthamstow, an area on the lines' Chingford branch, was home to the prominent textile artist William Morris.

In effect, “Weaver” honours the industry and communities at the southern end of the line (near Liverpool Street and the East End), while the majority of the route runs through areas with little direct connection to textiles. The line runs through Bethnal Green, the only historical area referenced by the name.

In a response to a 2024 freedom of information (FOI) request, TfL confirmed renaming the six London Overground lines and changing their colours cost £6.3 million, with the money coming from the Greater London Authority budget and the work spread across TfL’s 2023/24 and 2024/25 budgets, and a breakdown of the renaming consisting of:

Overground Renaming Cost
| Item | Budget |
|---|---|
| Customer information and research, including maps | £1,149,209 |
| Station design, signage and wayfinding | £2,322,544 |
| Digital systems and journey-planning updates | £748,111 |
| Train and fleet signage and onboard updates | £870,000 |
| Customer awareness and community engagement | £717,172 |
| Project management and operational readiness | £377,364 |
| Branding-agency engagement | £115,600 |
| Total | £6,300,000 |

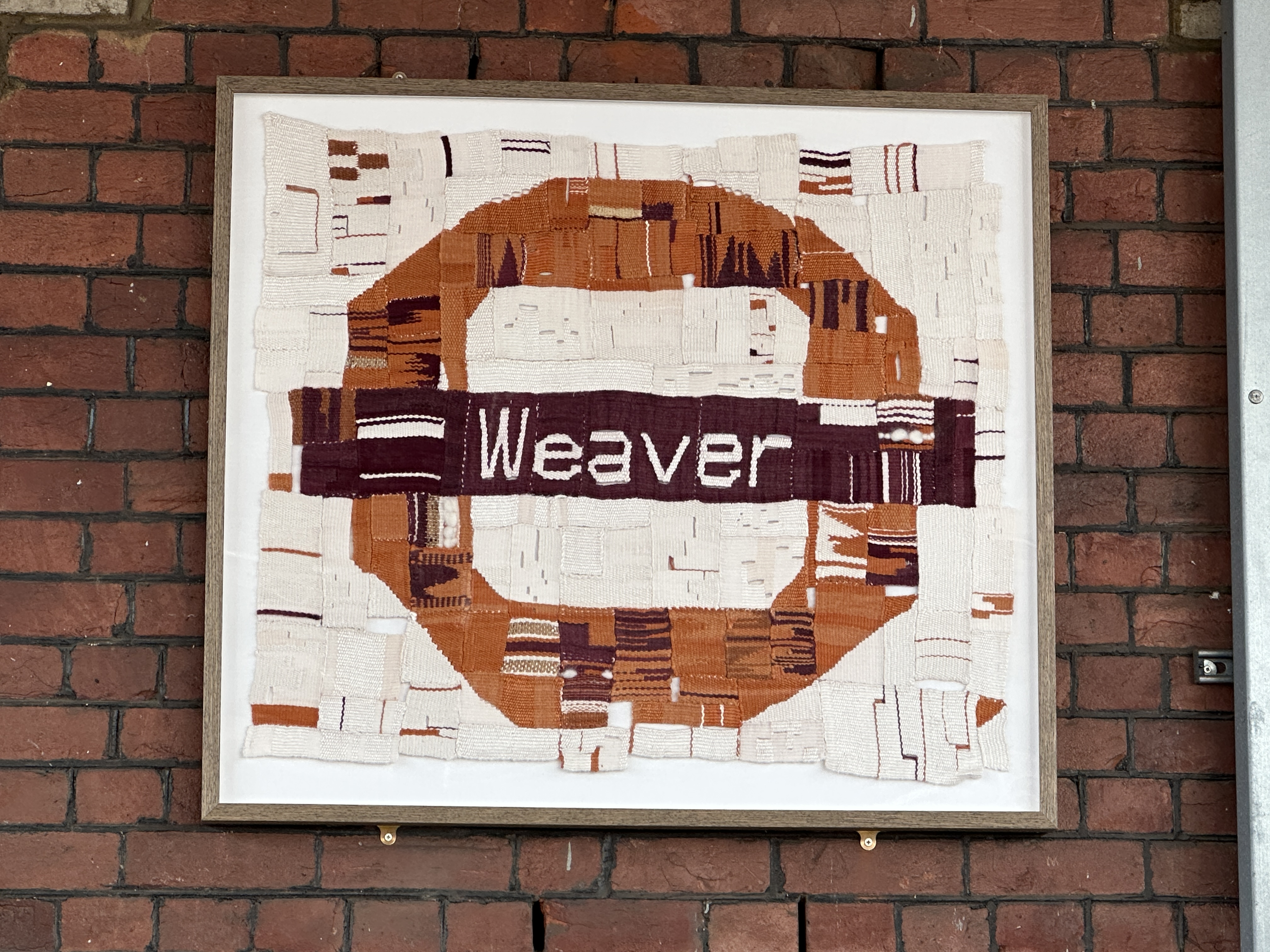
Weaver line roundel in fabric at Hackney Downs Station

The importance of the industry was such that two elements of the coat of arms of the London Borough of Tower Hamlets – the mulberry and the shuttle – are symbols of the industry.

There had been a local textile industry for time immemorial, but the arrival of Huguenot refugees bringing knowledge of advanced French techniques gave the industry a significant boost. The English word 'refugee', a loanword adopted from French, has its origin in the French word the Huguenots used to describe themselves.

Over the years much of the industry’s workforce would be made up of further waves of migrants from overseas including Ireland, Bangladesh and Jewish refugees from the Russian Empire.

== Route and services ==
Suburban services operating on the Southbury Loop terminating at Cheshunt, on the Enfield Town branch, and on the Chingford branch are operated by London Overground. The routes for the London Overground's Weaver line are:

- Southbury Loop (or Cheshunt Branch): London Liverpool Street – Cheshunt via Seven Sisters, Edmonton Green and Turkey Street, along the West Anglia Main Line to Hackney Downs Junction, rejoining it at Cheshunt Junction.
- Chingford Branch: London Liverpool Street – Chingford via Walthamstow Central, Wood Street and Highams Park, along the West Anglia Main Line to Clapton Junction.
- Enfield Town Branch: London Liverpool Street – Enfield Town via Seven Sisters, Edmonton Green and Bush Hill Park, along the West Anglia Main Line to Hackney Downs and the Southbury Loop to Edmonton Green and Edmonton Green Junction.

Until 1968 the Hall Farm Curve allowed trains from Stratford to Chingford. It may be reconstructed.

The line were historically part of the Network Rail Strategic Route 5, SRS 05.02, 05.04 and part of 05.01. This was classified as a London and South East Commuter line.

A number of services to/from Liverpool Street/Enfield Town start or terminate in different places on special occasions. When Tottenham Hotspur F.C. are playing at home, additional trains run, some starting/terminating from White Hart Lane or Seven Sisters.

The lines are double track for most of its length, however between Hackney Downs and Liverpool Street it is multitrack – the suburban lines for trains stopping at Bethnal Green, Cambridge Heath and London Fields and the Main Lines for non-stop West Anglia/Stansted Express services. It is electrified at 25 kV AC using overhead line equipment and has a line speed of 40–75 mph (64–121 km/h) except between Cheshunt and Coppermill junction where it is 60–85 mph (97–137 km/h). Different sections have different loading gauges. Most is W8, with the branches to Enfield Town and Chingford being W6.

As of May 2025, the services are:

Weaver line
| Route | tph | Calling at |
|---|---|---|
| London Liverpool Street to Enfield Town | 2 | Bethnal Green; Cambridge Heath; London Fields; Hackney Downs; Rectory Road; Stoke Newington; Stamford Hill; Seven Sisters; Bruce Grove; White Hart Lane; Silver Street; Edmonton Green; Bush Hill Park |
| London Liverpool Street to Cheshunt | 2 | Bethnal Green; Cambridge Heath; London Fields; Hackney Downs; Rectory Road; Stoke Newington; Stamford Hill; Seven Sisters; Bruce Grove; White Hart Lane; Silver Street; Edmonton Green; Southbury; Turkey Street; Theobalds Grove |
| London Liverpool Street to Chingford | 4 | Bethnal Green; Hackney Downs; Clapton; St James Street; Walthamstow Central; Wood Street; Highams Park |
