= Hackney Downs railway station =

National Rail station in London, England

Hackney Downs
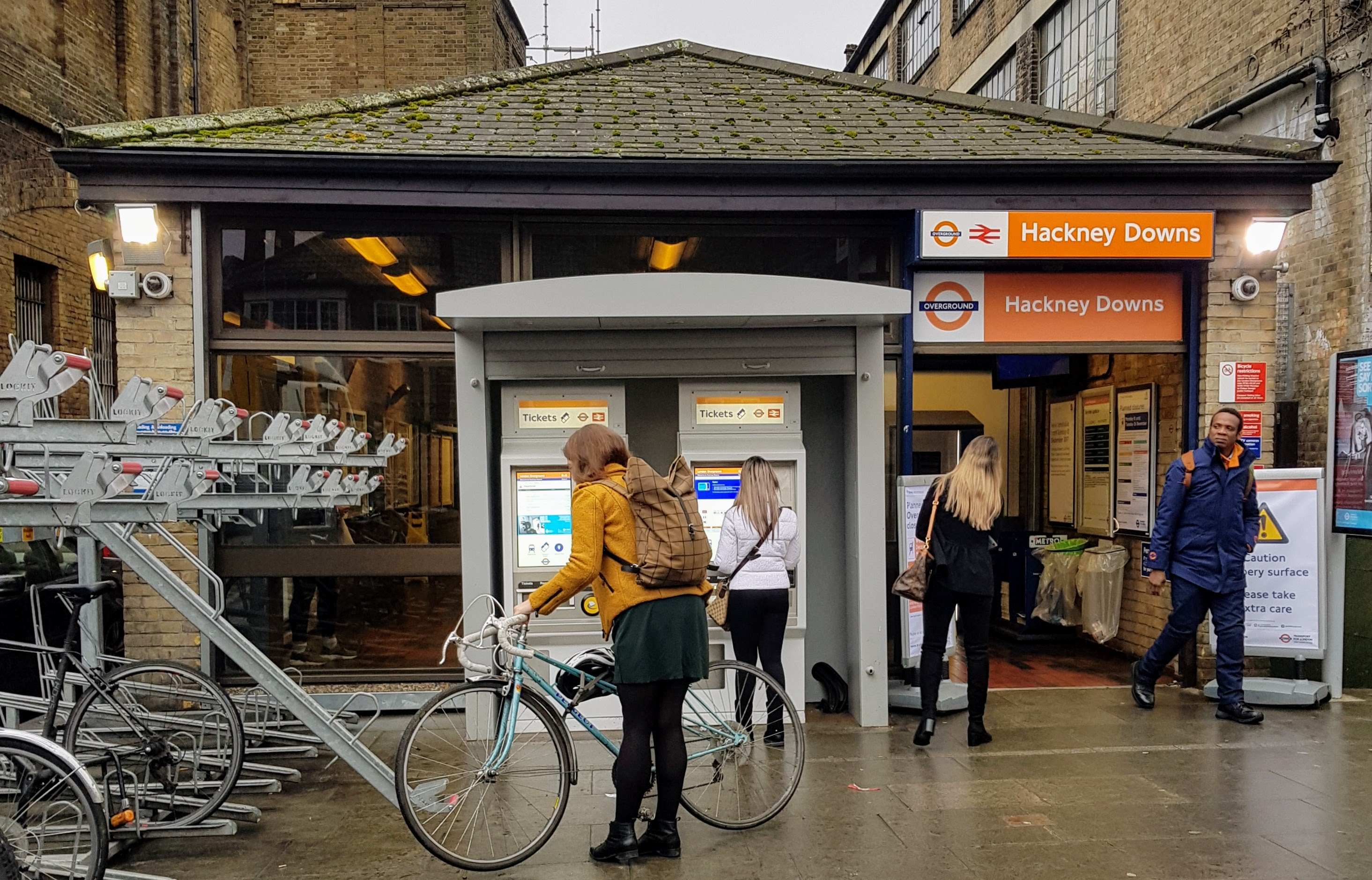
- Hackney Downs in December 2017
- Interactive map of Hackney Downs

General information
- Location: Hackney Central
- Local authority: London Borough of Hackney
- Managed by: London Overground
- Owner: Network Rail
- Station code: HAC
- DfT category: C2
- Number of platforms: 4
- Fare zone: 2
- OSI: Hackney Central

National Rail annual entry and exit
- 2020–21: ▼1.628 million
- Interchange: ▼1.050 million
- 2021–22: ▲2.387 million
- Interchange: ▲1.439 million
- 2022–23: ▲2.750 million
- Interchange: ▲1.563 million
- 2023–24: ▲3.058 million
- Interchange: ▲2.273 million
- 2024–25: ▼3.015 million
- Interchange: ▼1.880 million

Key dates
- 27 May 1872: Opened as Hackney Downs Junction
- 1896: Renamed Hackney Downs

Other information
- External links: Departures; Facilities
- Coordinates: 51.5483°N 0.0601°W

Hackney Downs is a London Overground and National Rail station in Hackney Central and serves the old common land of Hackney Downs in Lower Clapton in the London Borough of Hackney, it is on the Lea Valley lines and West Anglia Main Line. It is 2 miles 78 chains (4.8 km) down the line from London Liverpool Street and has a direct passenger link to Hackney Central station, providing interchange with the Mildmay line of the Overground network.

On the Weaver Line, the station is between London Fields and either Clapton (on the Chingford branch) or Rectory Road (on the Cheshunt/Enfield Town branch). Main line trains, operated by Greater Anglia, call at Hackney Downs between Liverpool Street and Tottenham Hale. Its three-letter station code is HAC and it is in London fare zone 2.

The station was originally named Hackney Downs Junction until 1896.

== History ==
=== Great Eastern Railway (1872–1922) ===
The station was opened on 27 May 1872 when the Great Eastern Railway opened the first part of its new line from Enfield Town to Stoke Newington. This was an exercise to provide new routes to the expanding suburbs of northeast London and to give a faster journey time to Enfield, whose trains at that time were routed via Stratford and Angel Road.

Just under a month later, another line opened linking Hackney Downs to Coppermill Junction just south of Tottenham Hale on what was then the main line to Cambridge. This new route offered a reduction in journey time for Cambridge and Shern Hall Street station in Walthamstow on the Chingford line services but also relieved congestion at Stratford railway station.

The route to Edmonton (on the existing Enfield branch line) fully opened on 1 August 1872 and the Chingford line was opened in November 1873. When the station opened it had two platforms and two centre roads.

The station layout was changed in 1894 when the line between Bethnal Green and Hackney Downs was increased from two tracks to four tracks. The layout was changed to a four platformed station and had two signal boxes.

=== London & North Eastern Railway (1923–1947) ===
After the Railways Act 1921 the country's railways were grouped into four companies, with effect from 1 January 1923. At Hackney Downs the London & North Eastern Railway (LNER) took over operations of the GER services. The semaphore signalling was replaced by single searchlight signals which were able to display three-aspects (Green, Yellow or Red) through different a changeable lens arrangement, in 1935. It was also in 1935 that electrification of the lines through Hackney was suggested, although many years were to pass before these plans came to fruition.

The 1935 re-signalling saw the closure of Hackney Downs South signal box with the North signal box (which dated from 1872) becoming plain Hackney Downs.

=== British Railways (1948–1994) ===
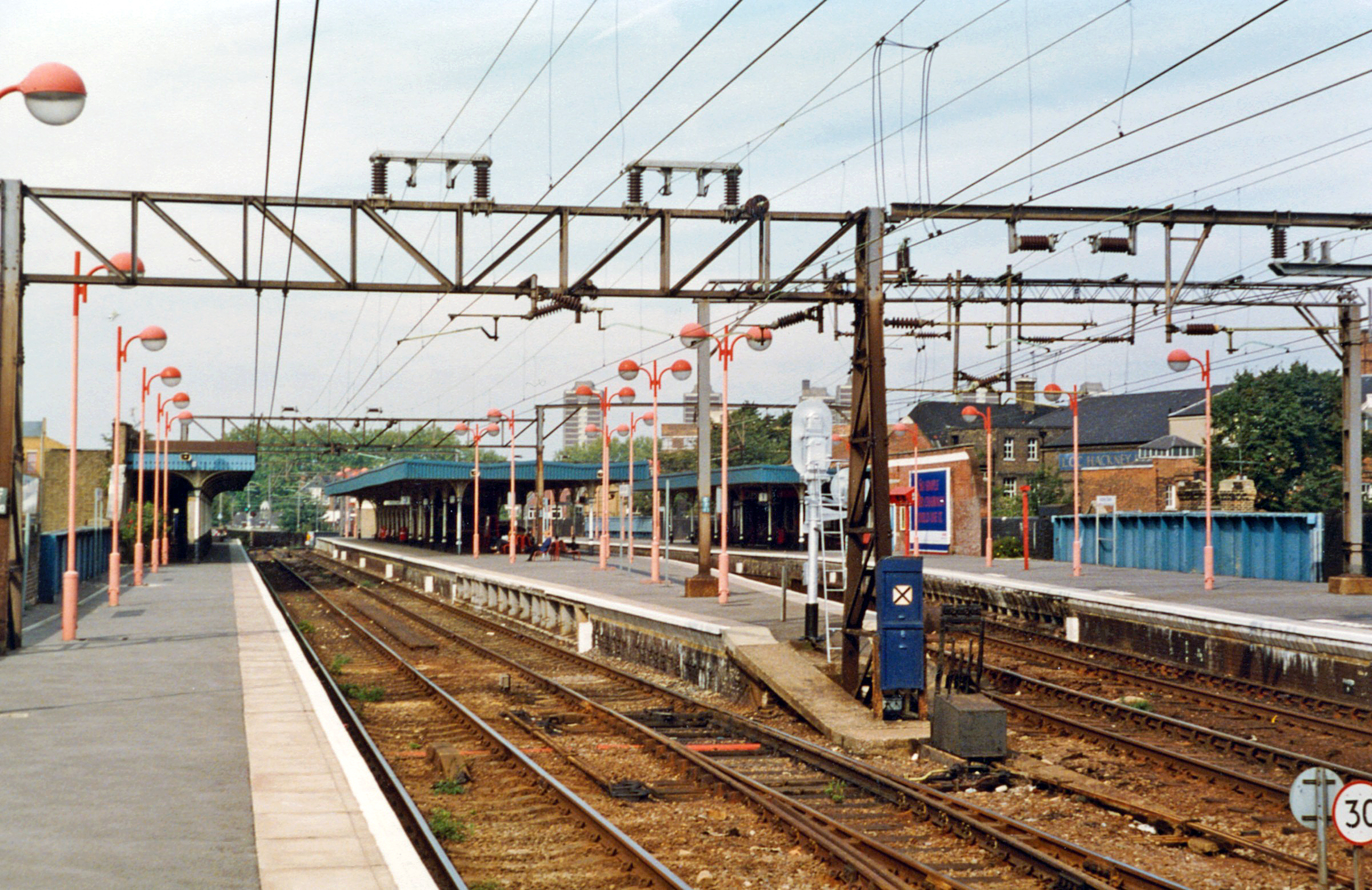
Hackney Downs railway station in September 1993

On nationalisation in 1948 responsibility for operating the station fell to British Railways (Eastern Region).

The lines through Hackney were electrified in the late 1950s with electric services commencing operation on 21 November 1960. The original 1872 signal box was replaced by a new signal box located on platforms 2 and 3 in May of the same year.

The ticket hall was rebuilt in the early 1980s along with changes to the roofs on the platforms. The island platform's wooden roof was replaced with steel sheeting on the existing frames whilst the side platforms were left unaltered other than the removal of their "dog-tooth" fascia boards.

To coincide with the closure of Broad Street station in 1986 a new line linking the North London Line to the Slow Lines just south of Hackney Downs was opened to allow operation of Watford - Liverpool Street services. This occupied the site of the former Graham Road GER goods depot which was accessed from the North London line. Passenger services ceased circa 1992 although empty stock trains have used it since. The line is little used in 2017.

=== Privatisation era (1994–present day) ===
The signal box, installed in 1960 when the line was electrified, closed in May 2001 when signalling on the line was centralised at Liverpool Street. Ticket barriers were installed in 2011.

A pedestrian link between Hackney Downs and Hackney Central stations was opened in 2015 by London Overground Rail Operations. Until Hackney Central's closure in 1944, a passenger connection had linked the two stations. However, when Hackney Central re-opened in 1985, the footway was not reinstated and passengers transferring between the two stations were obliged to leave one and walk along the street to the other, until the link was rebuilt.

The Lea Valley Lines were previously operated by Abellio Greater Anglia as part of the East Anglia franchise. In 2015 they transferred to the London Overground's Weaver line for operation. Some West Anglia Main Line services continue to call at Hackney Downs.

== Services ==
The typical service of trains per hour (tph) is as follows:

Operator/line	Frequency to destination
Weaver Line	8 tph to London Liverpool Street; 2 tph to Cheshunt; 2 tph to Enfield Town; 4 tph to Chingford
Greater Anglia	2 tph to London Liverpool Street; 2 tph to Hertford East

During the peak hours, the station is served by an additional 2tph to Enfield Town.

On Sundays, the station is served by hourly Greater Anglia services that continue beyond Broxbourne on the main West Anglia Main Line (via Harlow Town) through to Cambridge North rather than the usual half hourly services to Hertford East (which instead run to Stratford)

Preceding station	National Rail	Following station
London Liverpool Street towards	Greater Anglia Lea Valley Lines	Tottenham Hale towards
Preceding station	London Overground	Following station
London Fields towards Liverpool Street	Weaver line Lea Valley lines	Rectory Road towards Cheshunt or Enfield Town
Bethnal Green towards Liverpool Street	Weaver line Weaver Lea Valley lines	Clapton towards Chingford

== Connections ==
London Buses routes 30, 56 and 276 serve the station.
