= Edmonton Green railway station =

London Overground station

Edmonton Green
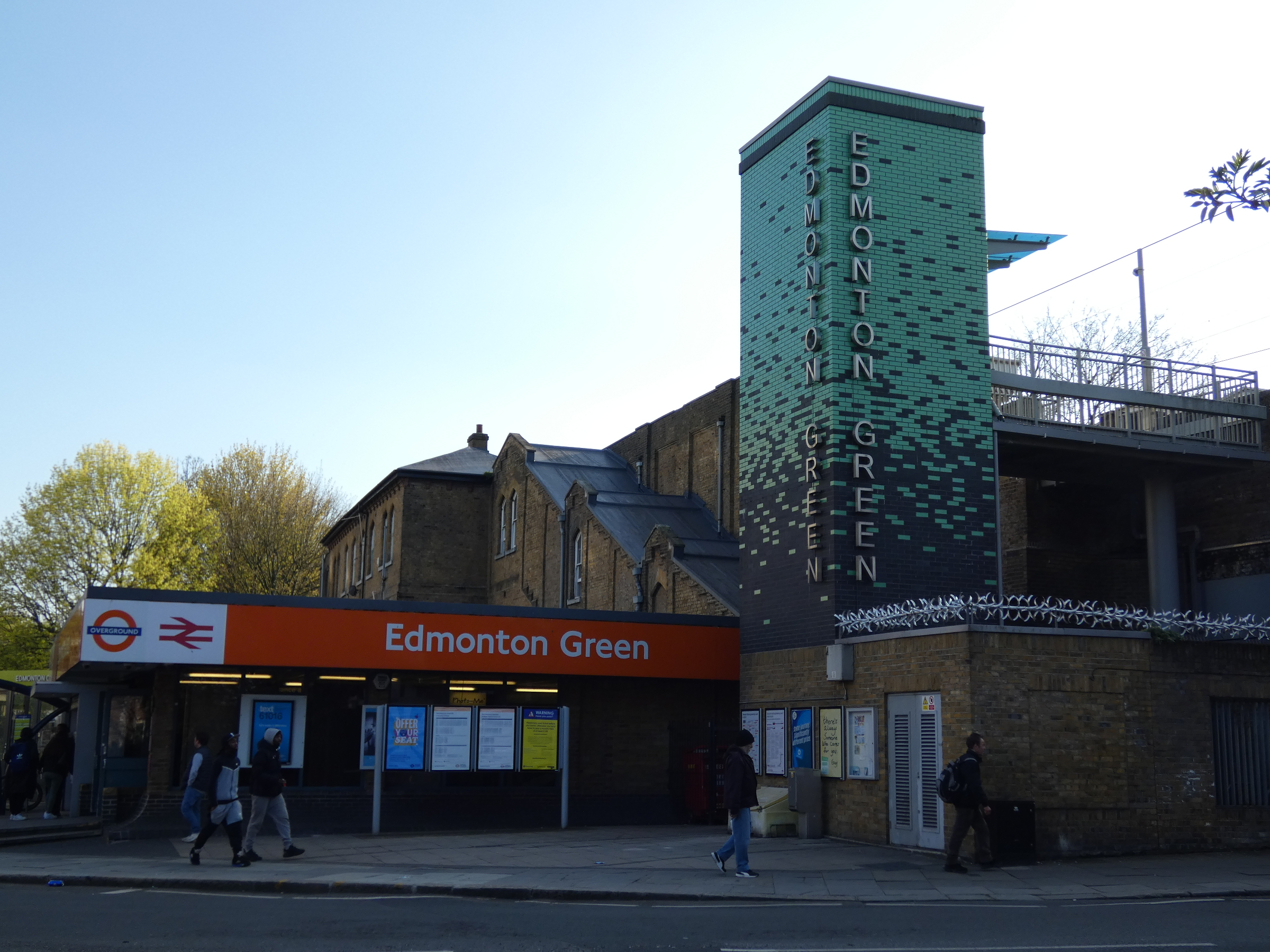
- Edmonton Green Station in April 2023
- Interactive map of Edmonton Green

General information
- Location: Edmonton
- Local authority: London Borough of Enfield
- Managed by: London Overground
- Station code: EDR
- DfT category: C2
- Number of platforms: 2
- Accessible: Yes
- Fare zone: 4

National Rail annual entry and exit
- 2020–21: ▼1.282 million
- Interchange: ▼8,631
- 2021–22: ▲2.519 million
- Interchange: ▲21,542
- 2022–23: ▲2.861 million
- Interchange: ▼18,649
- 2023–24: ▲3.557 million
- Interchange: ▲21,286
- 2024–25: ▼3.487 million
- Interchange: ▼20,177

Key dates
- 22 July 1872: open as Edmonton
- 1 July 1883: renamed Lower Edmonton (High Level)
- 11 September 1939: renamed Lower Edmonton
- 28 September 1992: renamed Edmonton Green

Other information
- External links: Departures; Facilities
- Coordinates: 51.6242°N 0.0614°W

Edmonton Green is a station on the Weaver line of the London Overground, located in Edmonton in the London Borough of Enfield, north London. It is 8 miles 45 chains (13.8 km) down the line from London Liverpool Street and is situated between Silver Street to the south and Bush Hill Park (on the Enfield Town branch) and Southbury (on the Cheshunt branch) to the north. Its three-letter station code is EDR and it is in London fare zone 4.

== History ==
Edmonton Green was opened as Edmonton (High Level) on 22 July 1872 by the Great Eastern Railway (GER) on its new, more direct line from London. The station was renamed Lower Edmonton (High Level) on 1 July 1883, with the suffix being dropped when the low level station closed on 11 September 1939. The name of Edmonton Green was adopted on 28 September 1992 as being more indicative of the area served and to promote the nearby Edmonton Green Shopping Centre.

The ticket hall was rebuilt in the early 1980s, and barriers were installed in 2012. Lifts to the platform level became operational in 2015. In 2015 the Lea Valley lines transferred from Abellio Greater Anglia operation to London Overground. This resulted in the ability of entitled Freedom Pass holders to use their passes at any time, as on the Underground. Edmonton Green was also then added to the Tube map.

== Services ==
All services at Edmonton Green are operated as part of the Weaver line of the London Overground using Class 710 EMUs.

The typical off-peak service in trains per hour is:

- 4 tph to London Liverpool Street
- 2 tph to Cheshunt
- 2 tph to Enfield Town

Additional Overground services call at the station during the weekday peak hours, when the Enfield Town service is increased from 2 to 4 tph. Greater Anglia operated a limited peak-time service between Liverpool Street and Hertford East via Seven Sisters that called here until May 2023, when it was withdrawn.

Preceding station	London Overground	Following station
Silver Street towards Liverpool Street	Weaver line Lea Valley lines	Southbury towards Cheshunt
Silver Street towards Liverpool Street	Weaver line Lea Valley lines	Bush Hill Park towards Enfield Town

== Connections ==
London Buses routes 102, 144, 149, 191, 192, 259, 279, 491, W6, W8, school route 616 and night route N279 serve the station, from the adjacent Edmonton Green bus station.
