= London Overground Rail Operations =

British train operating company

- Type: Private company
- Industry: Rail transport
- Founded: 11 November 2007
- Defunct: 13 November 2016
- Headquarters: London
- Area served: Greater London and Hertfordshire, England
- Key people: Steve Murphy, Chairman
- Services: Train operations
- Parent: Arriva UK Trains (50%); MTR Corporation (50%)
- Website: www.lorol.co.uk

London Overground Rail Operations Limited was a British train operating company contracted to operate the London Overground concession on the National Rail network, on behalf of Transport for London. The company was a 50:50 joint venture between Arriva UK Trains and MTR Corporation.

== History ==
On 20 February 2006, the Department for Transport announced that Transport for London would take over management of services then provided by Silverlink Metro.

In June 2006, Transport for London announced that Govia, MTR/Laing Rail, National Express and NedRail had been shortlisted to bid for the London Rail Concession. In September 2006, Transport for London announced that the extended East London Line would be included, and the operation branded London Overground.

In June 2007, Transport for London awarded the concession to MTR Laing, and operations started on 11 November 2007. The concession was for six years, four months until 31 March 2014 with a two-year extension option. The option was taken up with the concession to end on 12 November 2016.

In December 2007, Henderson Group, the parent company of John Laing plc, announced the sale of the Laing Rail division, which comprised half of LOROL, Chiltern Railways and a stake in the Wrexham & Shropshire open-access railway operator. In April 2008, Laing Rail was bought by the German Government's rail operator Deutsche Bahn, which now holds a 50% stake in LOROL. The price was said to be around €170 million. Laing Rail became part of DB Regio, before a restructuring saw it moved under the control of Arriva UK Trains.

In April 2015, Transport for London placed a notice in the Official Journal of the European Union, inviting expressions of interest in operating the next concession. On 31 May 2015, London Overground Rail Operations took over the Liverpool Street to Enfield Town, Cheshunt (via Seven Sisters) and Chingford services, as well as the Romford to Upminster service, from Abellio Greater Anglia.

In July 2015, Transport for London announced the shortlisted bidders for the next concession were Arriva UK Trains, ComfortDelGro, a Keolis/Go-Ahead joint venture and MTR Corporation. In March 2016, Arriva Rail London was awarded the concession commencing 13 November 2016.

== Services ==
London Overground operated these services:

- East London line: Highbury & Islington to West Croydon/Crystal Palace; Dalston Junction to New Cross/Clapham Junction
- Gospel Oak to Barking line: Gospel Oak to Barking
- North London line: Richmond to Stratford
- Watford DC line: Watford Junction to Euston
- West London line: Clapham Junction to Willesden Junction
- South London line: Dalston Junction to Clapham Junction
- Lea Valley line: Liverpool Street to Cheshunt and Enfield Town via Seven Sisters, and Chingford via Clapton
- Romford–Upminster line: Romford to Upminster

== Rolling stock ==
London Overground inherited a fleet of Class 150 Sprinter diesel multiple units, and Class 313 and Class 508 electric multiple units, from Silverlink. Between 2009 and 2011, the Sprinters were replaced with new Class 172 Turbostar units, and the Class 313s and 508s with new Class 378 Capitalstar units.

London Overground further inherited a number of Class 315 and Class 317 EMUs from Abellio Greater Anglia upon the takeover of the Lea Valley lines from Liverpool Street and the Romford–Upminster line on 31 May 2015.

=== Final fleet ===
Class	Image	Type	Number	Cars per set	Seat layout	Routes operated	Built
172/0 Turbostar		DMU	8	2	2+2	Gospel Oak to Barking line	2010
315		EMU	19	4	2+3	Lea Valley lines Romford–Upminster line	1980–1981
317/7		EMU	8	4	2+2	Lea Valley lines	1981–1982
317/8		EMU	6	4	2+3	Lea Valley lines	1981–1982
378/1 Capitalstar		EMU	20	5	Longitudinal	East London line South London line	2008–2011
378/2 Capitalstar		EMU	37	5	Longitudinal	North London line West London line East London line South London line Watford DC line	2008–2011

=== Past fleet ===
Class	Image	Type	Number	Cars per set	Seat layout	Routes operated	Built
150/1 Sprinter		DMU	8	2	2+3	Gospel Oak to Barking line	1984–1987
313/1		EMU	23	3	2+3	North London line West London line Watford DC line	1976–1977
321/4		EMU	2	4	2+3	Romford–Upminster line	1988–1990
508/3		EMU	3	3	2+3	Watford DC line	1979–1980

== Depots ==
London Overground's fleet was maintained at New Cross and Willesden depots.

New creation	Operator of London Overground concession 2007–2016	Succeeded by Arriva Rail London
