= Chingford railway station =

London Overground station

Chingford
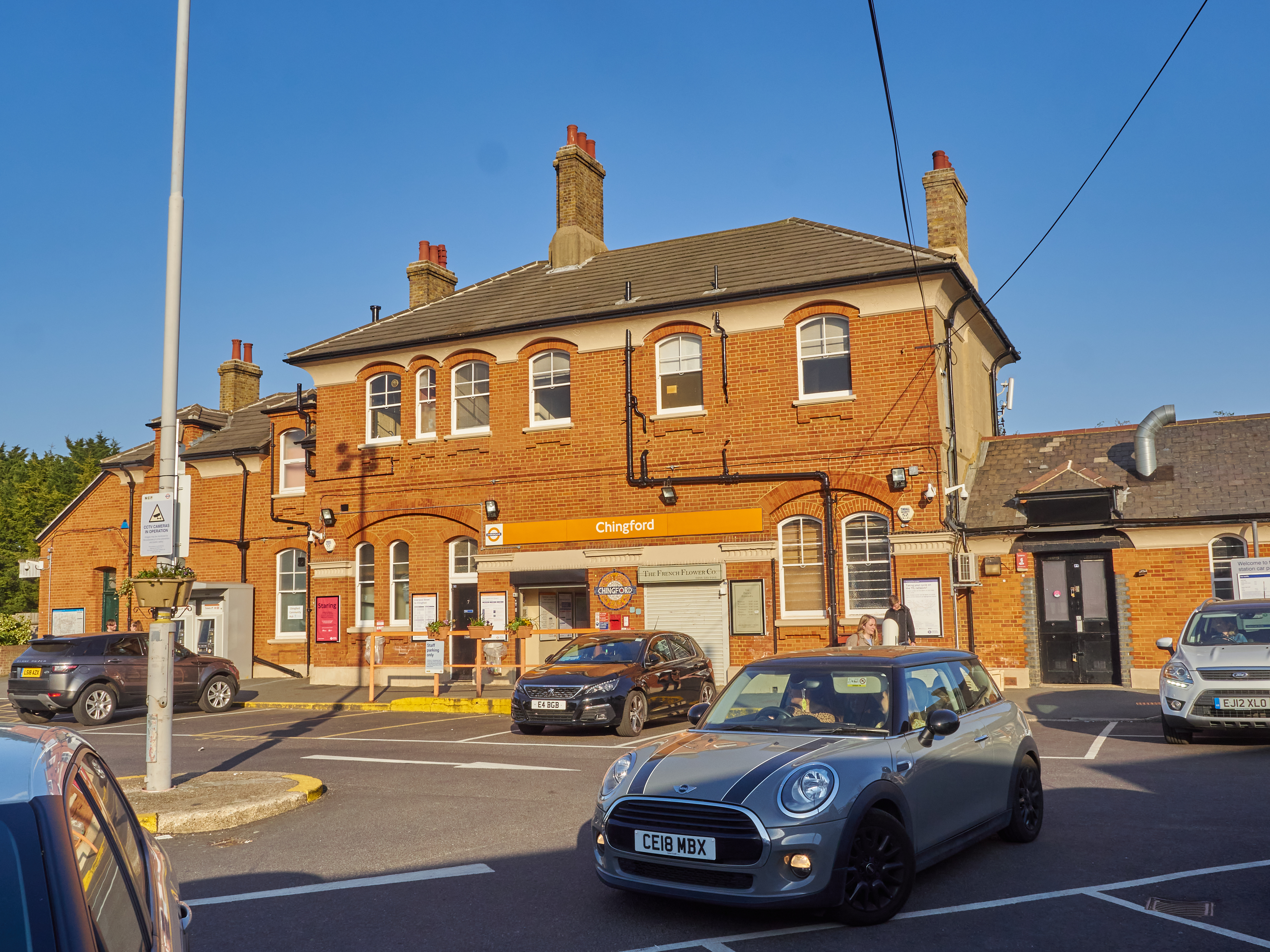
- Interactive map of Chingford

General information
- Location: Chingford
- Local authority: London Borough of Waltham Forest
- Managed by: London Overground
- Station code: CHI
- DfT category: C2
- Number of platforms: 3
- Accessible: Yes
- Fare zone: 5

National Rail annual entry and exit
- 2020–21: ▼0.563 million
- 2021–22: ▲1.361 million
- 2022–23: ▲1.695 million
- 2023–24: ▲2.040 million
- 2024–25: ▼2.037 million

Key dates
- 17 November 1873: Opened
- 2 September 1878: Relocated

Other information
- External links: Departures; Facilities
- Coordinates: 51.6331°N 0.0094°E

Chingford railway station is the terminus of the Chingford branch of the Lea Valley Lines, located in Chingford in the London Borough of Waltham Forest. It is one of three northern termini of London Overground's Weaver line, 10 miles 33 chains (16.8 km) down the line from London Liverpool Street. The station is in London fare zone 5, and is situated close to Queen Elizabeth's Hunting Lodge.

Its three-letter station code is CHI.

== History ==
The Eastern Counties Railway had begun its venture into a main line railway that would head north to compete with the Great Northern. Limited funds and incessant squabbling had slowed its progress. After the merger with several other lines, the ECR became part of the Great Eastern Railway. The GER planned a network of lines to serve countryside around London by the Great Eastern Railway (Metropolitan Station and Railways) Act 1864 (27 & 28 Vict. c. cccxiii). It also planned a line to High Beach, to serve Epping Forest, which reached a terminus in Bull Lane (now Kings Road) at the end of Hale End Road (now Larkshall Road) in Chingford, in 1873.

In 1878 the small station (named 'Chingford Green') near to the village green was replaced by a much more grandiose station on the very edge of town, overlooking the forest. The extension of the railway by only 600 yards (550 m) to a place far less useful to the local population was an attempt to trap tourist traffic to the forest, and to stimulate suburban growth in the fields surrounding it. The line was doubled and the new station built as a through station, with its platforms and tracks leading out onto an embankment.

The railway fostered new interest in the forest as a destination and the popularity of this Crown land and its impending loss to development was not unnoticed. In 1882 Queen Victoria came by train to Chingford and declared the forest open to the public forever. The railway that had encouraged so much interest and carried the royal party to the very edge of town was now stumped as any new development on the forest lands would be strictly controlled. However, the Chingford Rise Estate company developed land to the south with large villas, some of which now sell for over £1 million. Chingford became a commuter terminal and was eventually truncated to make way for a bus station.

The station building is relatively unchanged since its 1878 construction, and still carries the grandeur that accompanied the railway schemes of the late 19th century.

The line was electrified in the late 1950s by the Eastern Region of British Railways with electric services commencing on 21 November 1960. Early services were formed of Class 305 EMUs but initial technical problems with these saw replacements by Class 302 and Class 304 EMUs.

There is a plastic owl in the underside of the canopy over platform two, just outside the newsagent's, an attempt to stop pigeons landing there. Ticket barriers were installed in 2011.

Operation transferred from Abellio Greater Anglia to London Overground on 31 May 2015.

== Connections ==
Chingford bus station is located adjacent to Chingford railway station. London Buses routes 97, 179, 212, 313, 379, 385, 397, 444 and night route N26 serve the station.

== Services ==
Trains are operated as part of the Weaver line of the London Overground.

The typical off-peak weekday service pattern is:

- 4 trains per hour to London Liverpool Street.

The maximum length of trains to/from Chingford station is 8 carriages, though with Class 305 stock, it was 9.

Preceding station	London Overground	Following station
Highams Park towards Liverpool Street	Weaver line Lea Valley lines	Terminus
