= Enfield Town railway station =

London Overground station

Enfield Town
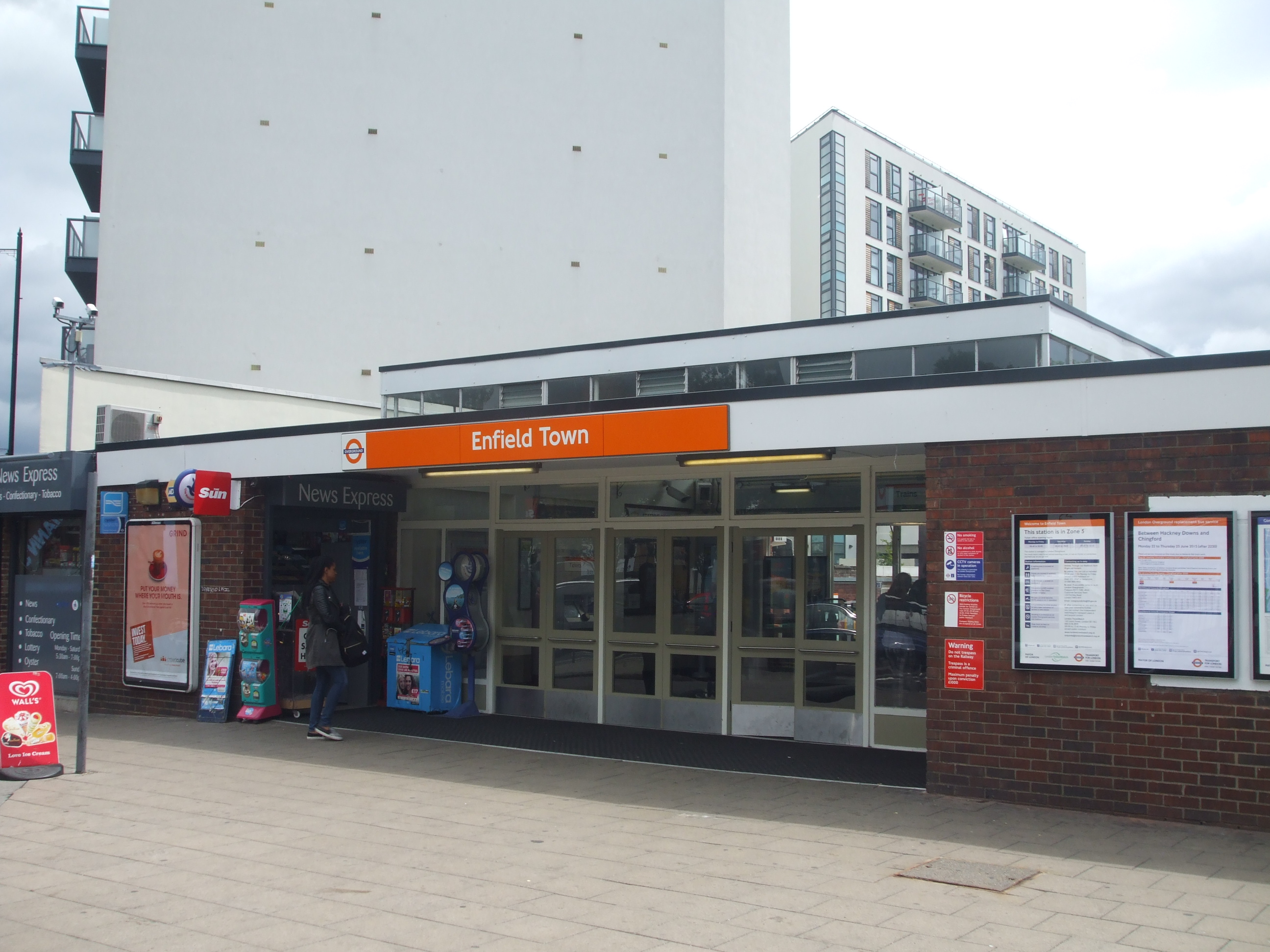
- Enfield Town Station
- Interactive map of Enfield Town

General information
- Location: Enfield
- Local authority: London Borough of Enfield
- Grid reference: TQ330965
- Managed by: London Overground
- Station code: ENF
- DfT category: C2
- Number of platforms: 3
- Accessible: Yes
- Fare zone: 5

National Rail annual entry and exit
- 2020–21: ▼0.642 million
- Interchange: ▼1,194
- 2021–22: ▲1.486 million
- Interchange: ▼754
- 2022–23: ▲1.831 million
- Interchange: ▲868
- 2023–24: ▲2.331 million
- Interchange: ▲1,243
- 2024–25: ▲2.343 million

Key dates
- 1 March 1849: Opened

Other information
- External links: Departures; Facilities
- Coordinates: 51.6516°N 0.0792°W

Enfield Town railway station is the terminus of the Enfield Town branch of the Lea Valley Lines, located in Enfield Town, north London. It is one of three northern termini of London Overground's Weaver line, 10 miles 55 chains (17.2 km) down the line from London Liverpool Street. Its three-letter station code is ENF and it is in London fare zone 5. In 2015 the line and Enfield Town station were transferred from Abellio Greater Anglia operation to London Overground and added to the Tube map.

== History ==
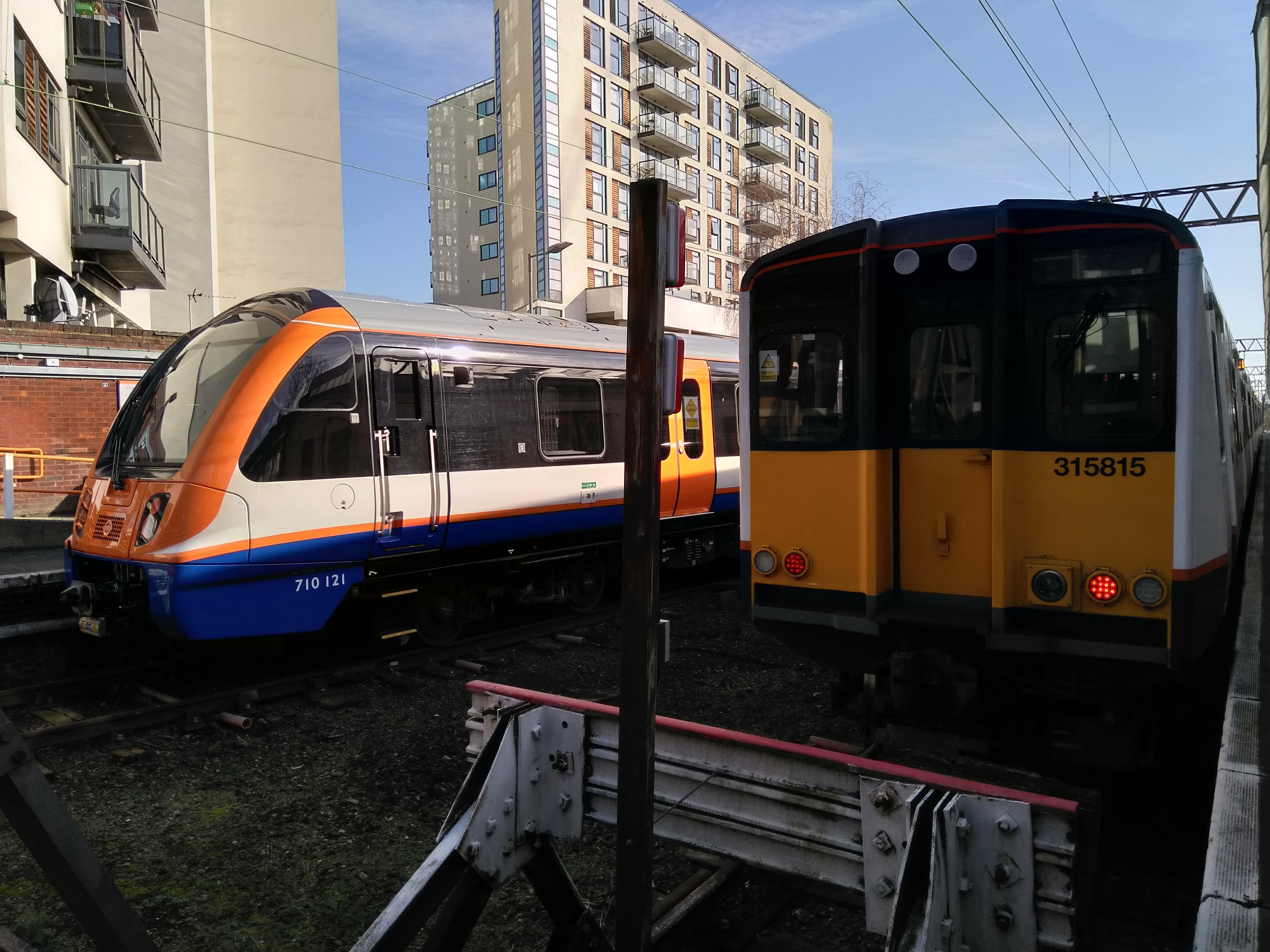
Old and new London Overground trains pictured in 2020 as the new Class 710 units were being introduced

The station was opened on 1 March 1849 by the Eastern Counties Railways as Enfield. It was renamed Enfield Town on 1 April 1886. A house which had stood on the site since the late 17th century is said to have been the birthplace of Isaac D'Israeli, father of Benjamin Disraeli. It later became a school, at which John Keats was educated. It then became the original station-house before being demolished in 1872. The fine 17th-century brickwork façade, once attributed to Christopher Wren, was dismantled, and reconstructed at South Kensington Museum.

Its place was taken by a brick station building with an attached station-master's house and a walled forecourt. This in turn was replaced in 1957 by the present building by the British Railways architect H. H. Powell. Operation of the station was transferred from National Express to Abellio Greater Anglia in 2012, and again in 2015 from Abellio Greater Anglia to London Overground.

== Stations in Enfield ==
Enfield Town is also served by the Hertford Loop Line with a station at Enfield Chase on the opposite side of the town centre. The nearest station on the West Anglia Main Line is at Ponders End. Enfield Lock is another main line station in the north of the town, on the Tottenham Hale branch of the Lea Valley Lines.

== Services ==
Enfield Town is one of three northern termini for Weaver line services operated by London Overground. The typical off-peak service from the station is two trains per hour to and from London Liverpool Street. At peak times four trains per hour serve the station, and on Tottenham Hotspur Football Club match days there are additional trains, which do not call at all stations along the line. There is also one weekday late evening Parliamentary service to Liverpool Street that runs via (but does not call at) South Tottenham rather than the usual route via Stoke Newington.

Preceding station	London Overground	Following station
Bush Hill Park towards Liverpool Street	Weaver line Lea Valley lines	Terminus

== Accidents ==
There have been at least four incidents of trains colliding with the buffer stops, including:

- 8 September 1850 – an Eastern Counties Railway passenger train collided with the buffers. The cause was determined to be a combination of brake failure and excessive speed.
- 17 October 1893 – a Great Eastern Railway locomotive collided with the buffers.
- 2002 - a train collided with the buffers due to low adhesion. There were no injuries.
- 12 October 2021 – an 8-car Class 710 train (headed by 710124) forming a London Overground service from Liverpool Street failed to stop at the buffers at the end of Platform 2, crashing through them and lifting the front car off the tracks. Seventy-five passengers were evacuated from the train, while the driver and one passenger were injured. Following a post-crash drugs test that allegedly revealed traces of cocaine, the driver was arrested on suspicion of being unfit to work on a transport system through drink or drugs. The official report by the Rail Accident Investigation Branch found that driver fatigue was also a cause of the accident.
