= British Rail Class 710 =

Electric multiple unit built for London Overground by Bombardier Transportation

British Rail Class 710 Aventra
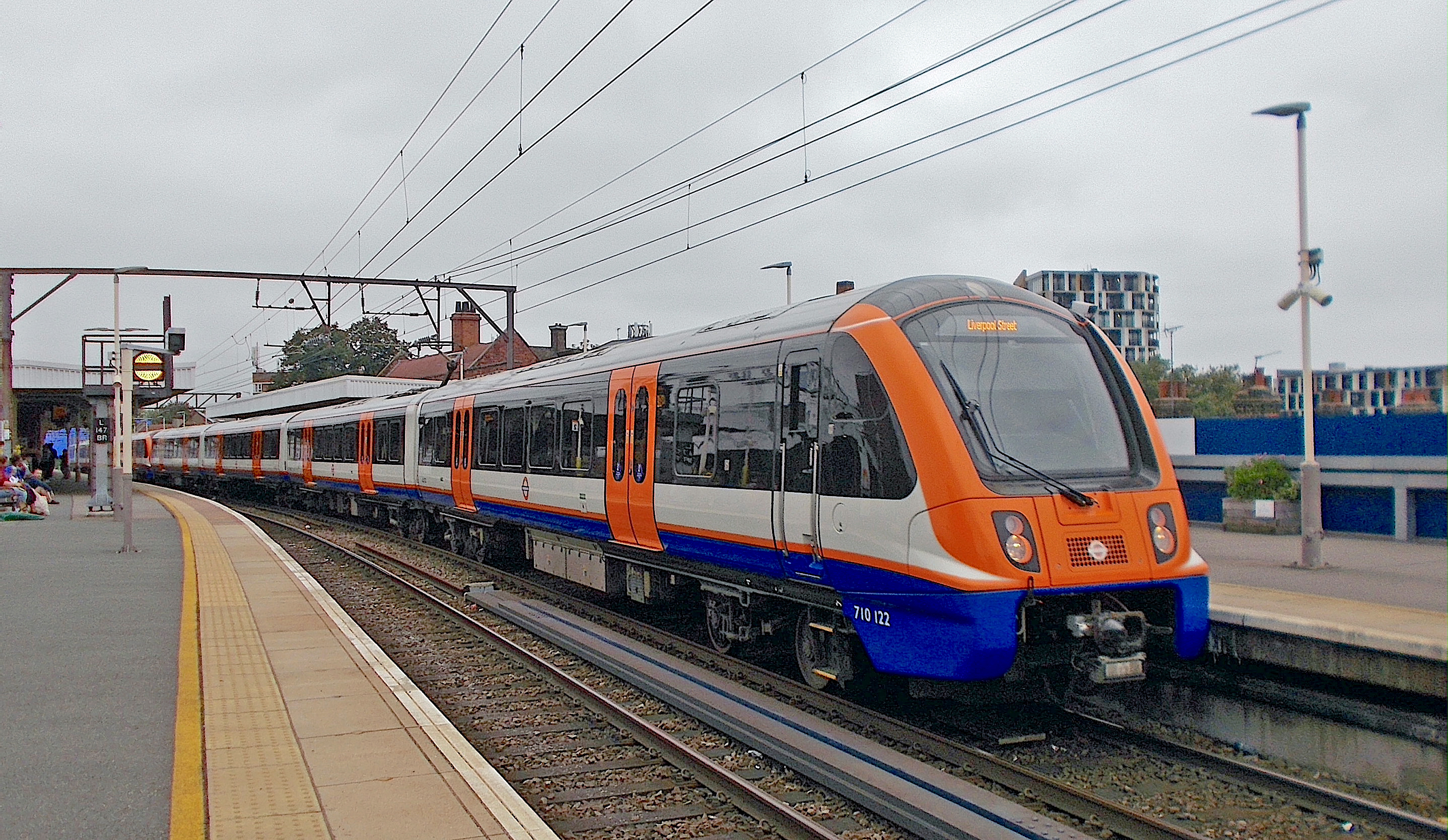
- London Overground Class 710 at Hackney Downs

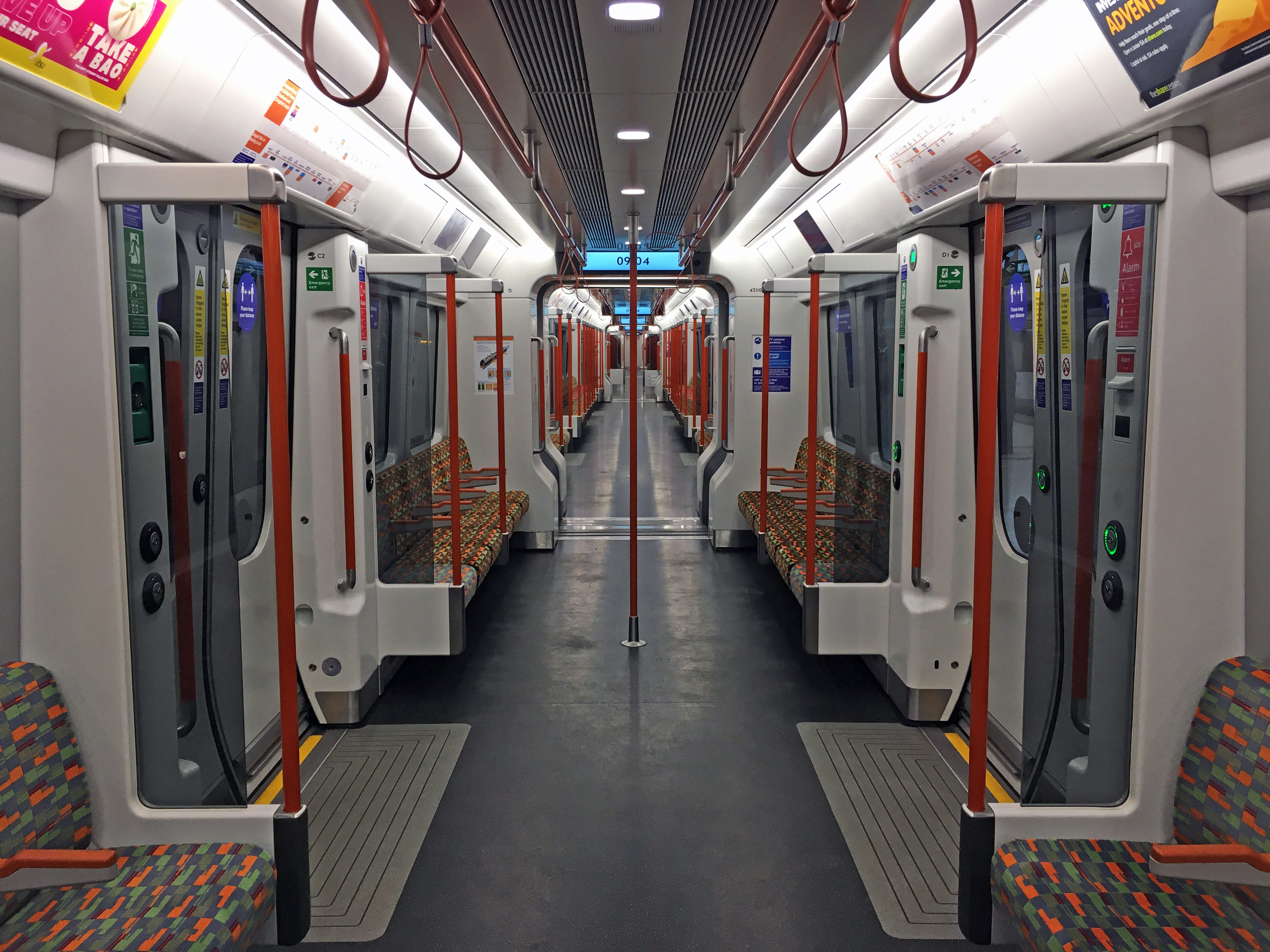
- The interior of a Class 710 unit
- In service: 23 May 2019 – present
- Manufacturer: Bombardier Transportation
- Built at: Derby Litchurch Lane Works
- Family name: Aventra
- Replaced: Class 315; Class 317; Class 378 (Note: On the Lioness line and Suffragette line.)
- Constructed: 2017–2020
- Number built: 54
- Formation: 4-car: (710/1 & 710/2); DMS-PMS(W)-MS-DMS; 5-car: (710/3); DMS-MS-PMS(W)-MS-DMS
- Fleet numbers: 710101–710130; 710256–710273; 710374–710379
- Capacity: 4-car: (710/1 & 710/2); 189 seats plus 489 standees; 5-car: (710/3); 241 seats plus 614 standees
- Operator: London Overground
- Depots: Willesden (London); Ilford (London)
- Lines served: Liberty line (Note: London Overground gave new names to their services in 2025. The Lea Valley Lines were branded Weaver line, the Gospel Oak to Barking line was named the Suffragette line, the Romford–Upminster line became the Liberty line, the Watford DC line was named Lioness line and services on the North London and West London lines were branded as the Mildmay line.); Lioness line; Mildmay line; Suffragette line; Weaver line

Specifications
- Car body construction: Aluminium
- Train length: 4-car: 82.87 m (271 ft 11 in); 5-car: 102.86 m (337 ft 6 in)
- Car length: DM vehs.: 21,446 mm (70 ft 4 in); Others: 19,990 mm (65 ft 7 in)
- Width: 2,772 mm (9 ft 1 in)
- Height: 3,760 mm (12 ft 4 in)
- Doors: Double-leaf sliding plug; (2 per side per car)
- Maximum speed: 75 mph (120 km/h)
- Weight: 710/1: 144 t (142 long tons; 159 short tons); 710/2: 151 t (149 long tons; 166 short tons); 710/3: 182 t (179 long tons; 201 short tons)
- Electric systems: Overhead line, 25 kV 50 Hz AC; Third rail, 750 V DC (710/2 & 710/3 only)
- Current collection: Pantograph (AC); Contact shoe (DC) (710/2 & 710/3 only)
- Bogies: Bombardier Flexx-Eco
- Braking systems: Electro-pneumatic (disc) and rheostatic; (Knorr-Bremse RZKK and RZTS)
- Safety systems: AWS; TPWS
- Coupling system: Dellner 12
- Multiple working: Within class (up to 12 cars total)
- Track gauge: 1,435 mm (4 ft 8 1/2 in) standard gauge

Notes/references
- Sourced from unless otherwise noted.

The British Rail Class 710 Aventra is a class of electric multiple unit passenger trains built by Bombardier Transportation for use on the London Overground network. The trains are part of Bombardier's Aventra family. The contract to provide 45 four-car trains was awarded in July 2015 and the trains were originally due to enter service in May 2018, although introduction was delayed until May 2019.

== History ==
=== Background and specifications ===
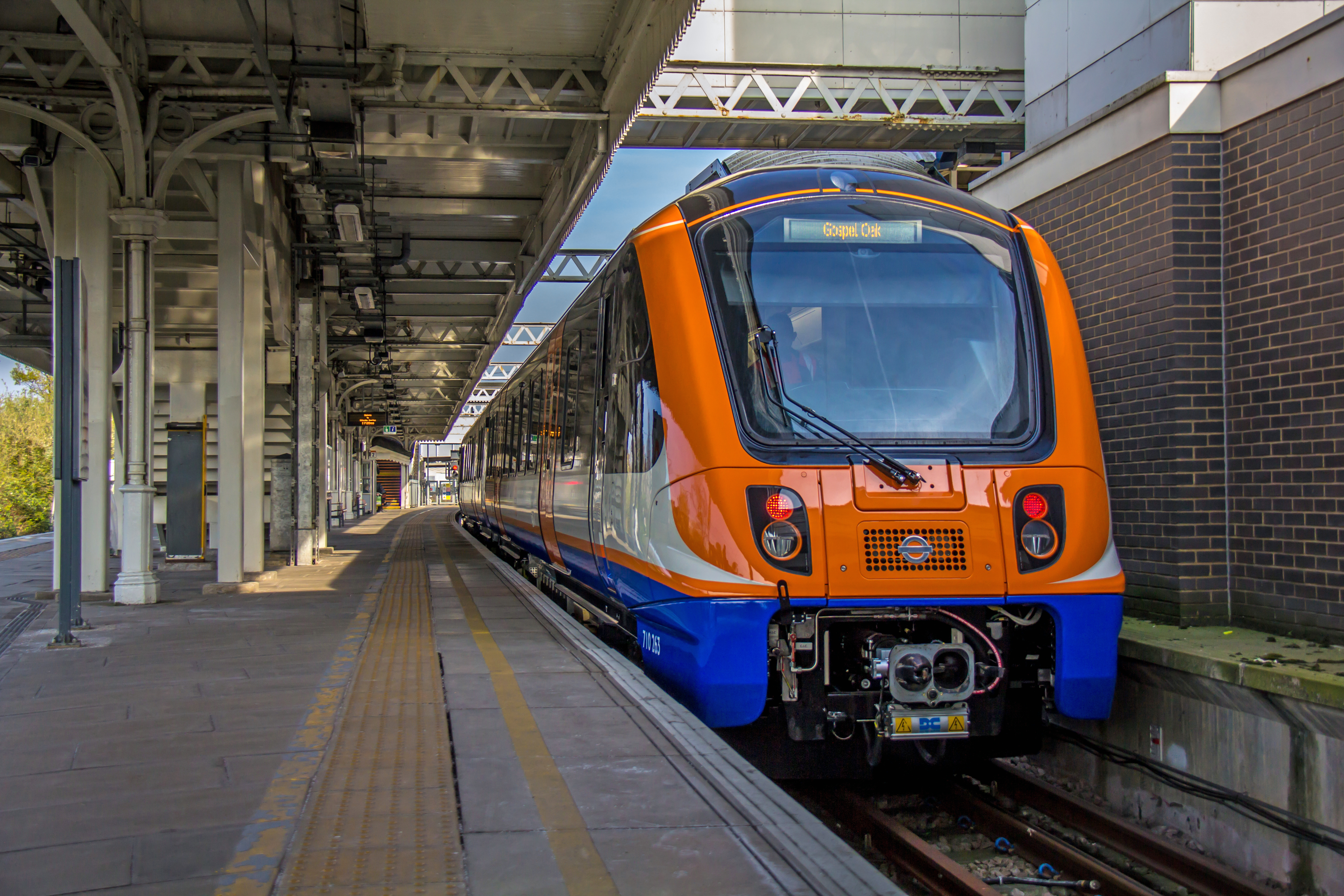
Class 710 sitting at Willesden Junction for a test run in April 2019

In 2012, Transport for London (TfL) announced its intention to procure a fleet of new, longer DMUs, as the Class 172 units then in service were unable to handle the passenger demand, causing overcrowding throughout the day. TfL issued a tender for manufacturers to supply eight three- or four-car trains. However, this proposal was subsequently shelved when the Government announced in June 2013 that the Gospel Oak to Barking line would be electrified, with proposals instead to purchase a fleet of new EMUs.

TfL invited expressions of interest for a total of 39 four-car EMUs in April 2014, with 30 required for the Lea Valley Lines, eight for the Gospel Oak to Barking line, and one for the Romford–Upminster line - all of which have replaced Class 315 and Class 317 trains dating from the 1980s, and Class 172 trains dating from 2010. Since then the planned procurement was increased to 45 four-car EMUs, with the additional six units intended for the Watford DC Line. The intention is that the five-car Class 378 trains currently used on the Watford DC line will be cascaded back to the North London line and East London Lines to allow for strengthened services. TfL issued an Invitation to Tender (ITT) in early 2015.

=== Contract award and construction ===
In July 2015, TfL announced that it had placed a £260m order for 45 four-car Bombardier Aventra EMUs, with an option for 24 more four-car units plus further options to extend some or all units including option units to five cars. These are similar to the Class 345 and Class 720 trains used on the Elizabeth line, c2c and Greater Anglia services.

The units were delivered in two subclasses; an AC-only version – subclass /1 – for use on the Lea Valley lines and Romford–Upminster services, and a dual-voltage version – subclass /2 – for the Watford DC and Gospel Oak to Barking line services. These carry pantographs on their PMS(W) vehicles and are maintained at Willesden TMD, while the subclass /1 units are maintained at Ilford EMU Depot. Both versions have all-longitudinal seating, after the plan to fit some transverse seats to the AC units was dropped.

In 2017, Transport for London put forward a proposal to procure nine additional Class 710 units for the purpose of capacity enhancement, using 42 of the 249 additional vehicles for which TfL held options. Of the nine units, three would be four-car units (one for the Watford DC line and two for the extension of the Gospel Oak – Barking line to Barking Riverside), while the other six would be five-car units for the North London line and West London line, allowing a cascade of Class 378 units from those lines to the East London line. Following delivery, the six five-car units were renumbered from subclass /2 to subclass /3.

=== Delays in introduction ===
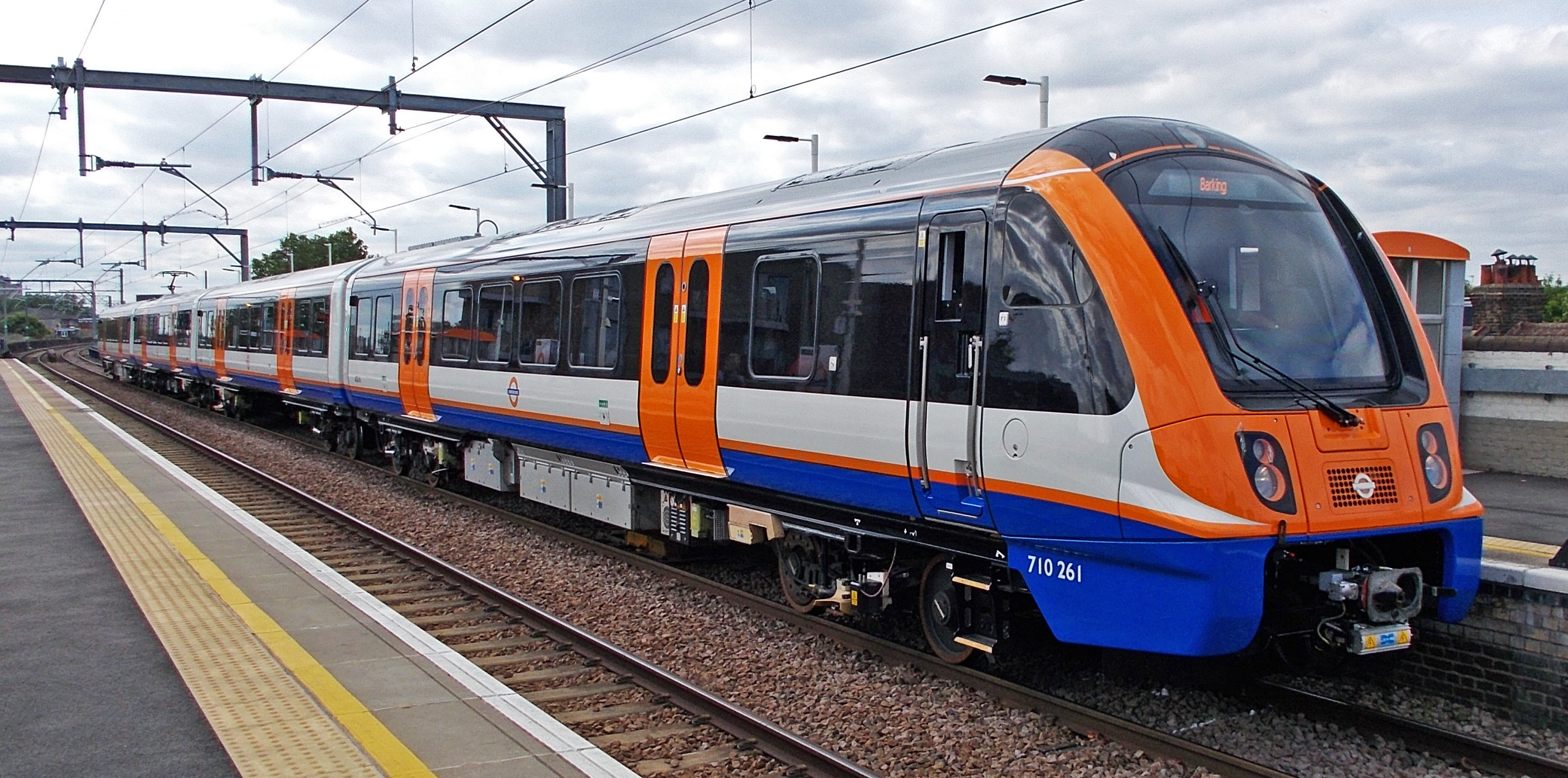
Class 710 at Leyton Midland Road

In April 2018, the Islington Gazette reported that the trains would be introduced three months later than scheduled due to delays in their testing.

In June 2018, the Barking & Dagenham Post reported that the trains would be in service by November 2018, "almost 18 months later than planned".

In November 2018, TfL said that they hoped the units would be in service by December 2018; however, further delays prevented this.

In January 2019, TfL announced that three Class 378 trains would temporarily be deployed on the Gospel Oak to Barking line while continued problems with the Class 710 units were resolved, since leases on the existing Class 172 stock running on this line would come to an end before the 710's likely introduction into passenger service. In April 2019, the Office of Rail and Road approved the use of the Class 710, with restrictions.

== Operations ==
In May 2019, TfL announced that approval had been gained for the Class 710s to enter passenger service. The first two units entered service on the Gospel Oak to Barking line on Thursday 23 May 2019 and the remaining six were in service by August 2019, with the first unit entering service on the Watford DC line on 9 September 2019.

The first units on the Lea Valley lines entered service on 3 March 2020 after a first attempt on 24 February 2020. The services on the Romford–Upminster line started on 5 October 2020. The Class 710/3 five-car units are operating on the Watford DC line.

== Incidents ==
On 12 October 2021, the driver and a passenger were injured when an eight-car Class 710 train, headed by unit 710124, ran through the buffers at Enfield Town. Following a post-incident drugs test that revealed traces of cocaine, the driver was arrested on suspicion of being unfit to work on a transport system through drink or drugs. He was subsequently convicted of endangering the safety of the railway and sentenced to sixteen weeks' imprisonment.

On 15 October 2026, unit 710 112 collided with the buffers at Liverpool Street station and was derailed. It was operating an empty coaching stock service from Chingford.

== Fleet details ==
Subclass	Operator	Qty.	Year built	Cars per unit	Unit nos.	Description
710/1	London Overground	30	2017–2020	4	710101–710130	AC-only units for the Liberty line and the Weaver line.
710/2	London Overground	18	2017–2020	4	710256–710273	Dual-voltage units for the Lioness line and the Suffragette line.
710/3	London Overground	6	2017–2020	5	710374–710379	Dual-voltage units for the Lioness line and the Mildmay line.

=== Illustration ===
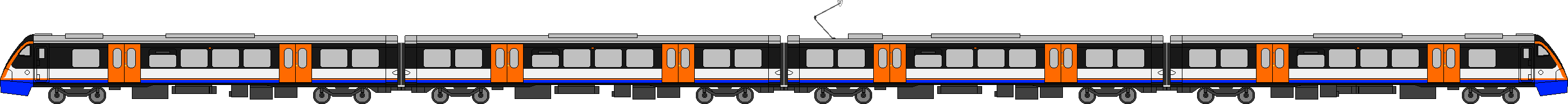
Class 710 four-car unit

== See also ==
- British Rail Class 345, a similar fleet of Aventra trains used on the Elizabeth line.
- British Rail Class 720, another fleet of Aventra trains used by c2c and Greater Anglia.
