= Cheshunt railway station =

National Rail station in Hertfordshire, England

Cheshunt
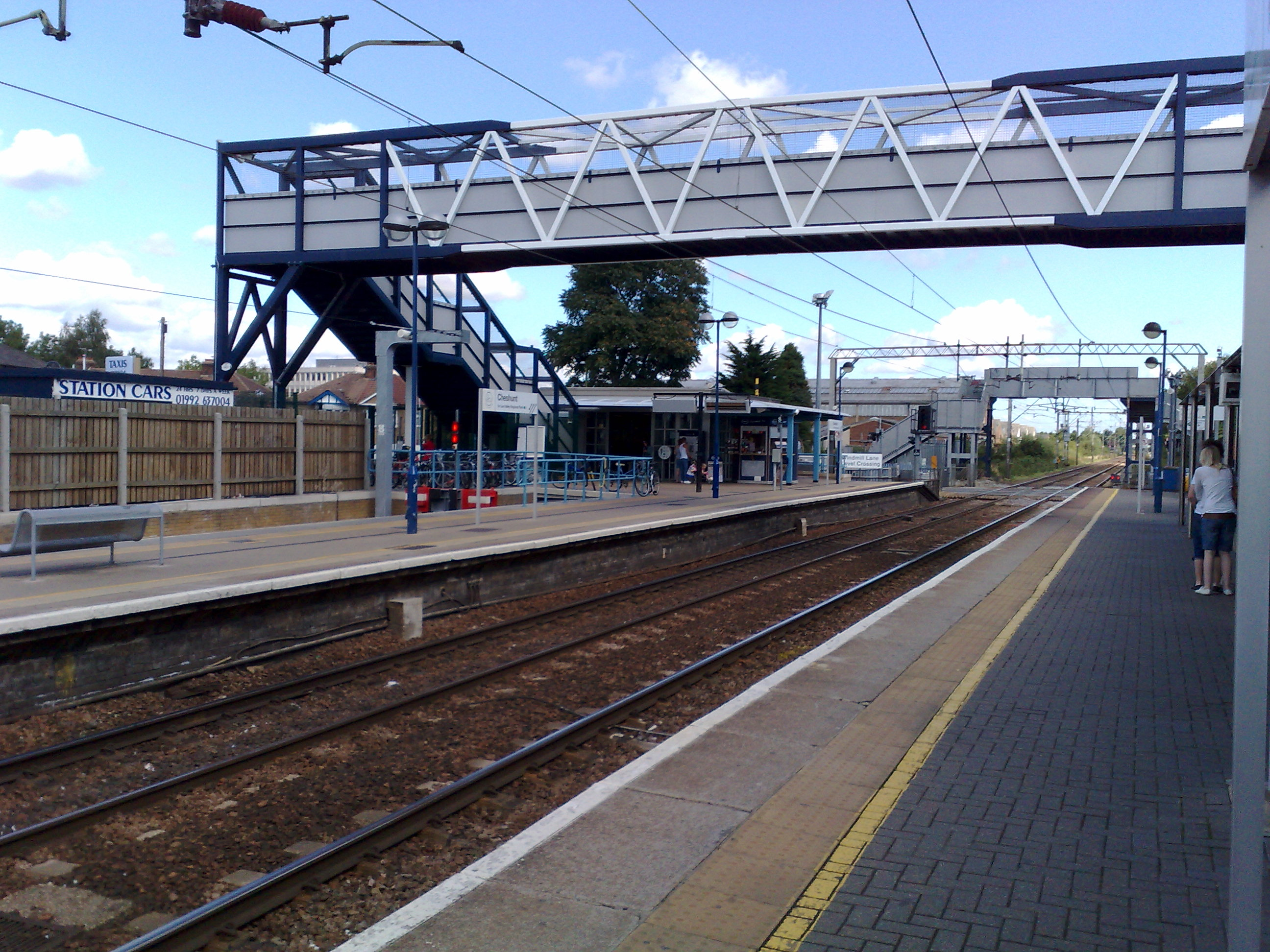
- The station in August 2008, after rebuilding works were completed in 2006
- Interactive map of Cheshunt

General information
- Location: Cheshunt
- Local authority: Borough of Broxbourne
- Grid reference: TL366022
- Managed by: Greater Anglia
- Owner: Network Rail
- Station code: CHN
- DfT category: C2
- Number of platforms: 3
- Accessible: Yes
- Fare zone: 8

National Rail annual entry and exit
- 2020–21: ▼0.730 million
- Interchange: ▼91,950
- 2021–22: ▲1.709 million
- Interchange: ▲0.213 million
- 2022–23: ▲2.126 million
- Interchange: ▲0.232 million
- 2023–24: ▲2.443 million
- Interchange: ▲0.291 million
- 2024–25: ▲2.547 million
- Interchange: ▲0.314 million

Railway companies
- Original company: Eastern Counties Railway
- Pre-grouping: Great Eastern Railway
- Post-grouping: London and North Eastern Railway

Key dates
- 31 May 1846: Original station opened
- 1 October 1891: Station resited

Other information
- External links: Departures; Facilities
- Coordinates: 51.703°N 0.024°W

Cheshunt is an interchange station for London Overground (Weaver line) and Greater Anglia services on the Lea Valley lines, located in Cheshunt in the Borough of Broxbourne. It is on the West Anglia Main Line section of the Lea Valley lines, 14 miles 1 chain (22.6 km) from London Liverpool Street and situated between Waltham Cross and Broxbourne stations. It is also the final station on the Southbury Loop after Theobalds Grove, forming one of three northern termini for Weaver line services.

The station is in London fare zone 8, and is adjacent to the Lee Valley Regional Park. During the London 2012 Olympic Games, Cheshunt and Waltham Cross provided the main rail access to the Lee Valley White Water Centre.

== History ==
=== Cheshunt's first railway ===
A railway existed in Cheshunt before the station and the main line from London was originally opened in the 1840s. The horse-drawn Cheshunt Railway was opened on 26 June 1825. Based on a design by Henry Robinson Palmer, this suspension railway line ran for 0.75 mi (1.21 km) from the town's high street to the River Lea, near to where Cheshunt station is today. This long-defunct railway is of interest as it was the world's first passenger-carrying monorail and the first railway line to open in Hertfordshire.

=== Early years (1840–1862) ===
The line from Stratford to Broxbourne was opened by the Northern and Eastern Railway on 15 September 1840. Initially, a temporary station was opened on Cadmore Lane to the north of the current station but that only lasted for a couple of months between April and 1 June 1842. The existing station was opened by the Eastern Counties Railway, which had leased the N&ER from 1 January 1844, on 31 May 1846 and was located near the level crossing on Windmill Lane. The two platformed station was of timber construction with a two-storey station building and platforms either side of the level crossing. In November 1861, gas lighting was provided.

By the 1860s, the railways in East Anglia were in financial trouble and most were leased to the ECR; they wished to amalgamate formally, but could not obtain government agreement for this until 1862, when the Great Eastern Railway was formed by amalgamation. Thus Cheshunt became a GER station in 1862.

=== Great Eastern Railway (1862–1922) ===
In 1881, a footbridge was provided. With the development of horticulture in the Lea Valley during the early 1880s, a small goods yard was provided.

A new line from Bury Street Junction, north of Lower Edmonton High Level railway station, to Cheshunt was opened by the Great Eastern Railway on 1 October 1891; it was known as the Churchbury Loop. Around this time, the station was rebuilt with both platforms located south of the level crossing and additional bay platforms being provided on the up and down side of the station. Brick and tile station buildings were provided and a new signal box was provided.

In 1905, the platforms were extended and the station was repainted the following year.

In 1907, a short siding on the up side south of the station to a ballast pit operated by Boyer & Son was opened. Expansion of the horticultural industry saw the goods yard extended in 1909. Inwards traffic was manure and coal for the horticultural industry.

Falling passenger numbers saw the Churchbury Loop passenger services withdrawn on 1 October 1909; the then President of the Board of Trade, Winston Churchill, had to answer a question on the subject in the House of Commons as a railway closure was, at that point, a rare occurrence.

During World War I, the Lea Valley was a centre of the munitions industry and the government called on the GER to restore passenger services which served the original stations. Once the war finished, demand again fell off and services were withdrawn on 1 July 1919.

=== London and North Eastern Railway (1923–1947) ===
On 1 January 1923, the GER became part of the London and North Eastern Railway. In 1932, a new down loop was added south of the junction for the Churchbury Loop line. At this stage, the signal box which was located south of the station on the up side had 63 levers for the operation of points and signals.

=== British Railways (1948–1996) ===
The nationalisation of Britain's railways saw the operation of Cheshunt station pass to British Railways Eastern Region. From 1958, local passenger services between Cheshunt and London, via Tottenham Hale, were normally operated by Class 125 diesel multiple units. The lines from Hackney Downs, via Seven Sisters, to Bishop's Stortford and Hertford East, including those through Cheshunt, were electrified on 21 November 1960. This saw the restoration of passenger services to the former Churchbury Loop line which was renamed the Southbury Loop. The down side bay, where these normally terminated, was not electrified.

The goods yard was closed on 1 June 1966. In preparation for the new Lea Valley electric services, the area was resignalled on 11/12 January 1969, although Cheshunt signal box was retained. The lines south via Tottenham Hale were not electrified until 10 March of the same year, with electric passenger services starting on 5 May 1969. When sectorisation was introduced in the 1980s, the station was served by Network SouthEast until the privatisation of British Rail.

=== Privatisation (1996–present) ===
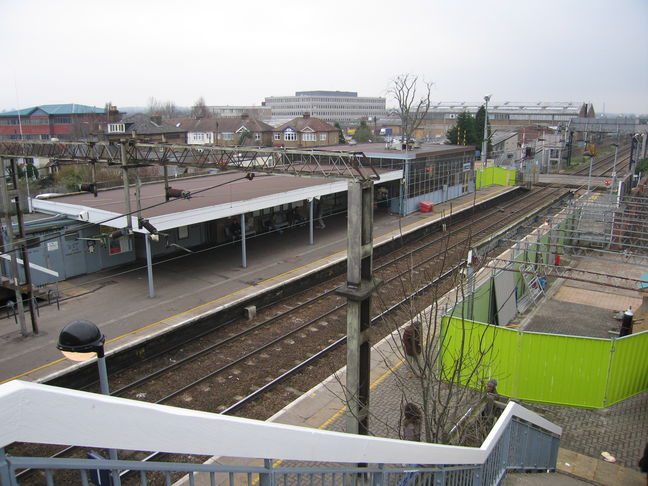
The station in January 2006, just after the start of renovation works

With the privatisation of the UK's railways in 1994, operation of the station was initially allocated to a business unit which succeeded the old British Railways structure before being taken over by West Anglia Great Northern (WAGN) in January 1997. WAGN operated the station from January 1997 until 2004, when the UK Strategic Rail Authority made changes to the franchise arrangements and the line became part of the Greater Anglia franchise, which covered the whole of East Anglia.

In August 2002, signalling control was transferred to the Liverpool Street Integrated Electronic Control Centre (IECC), although the signal box closed officially on 24 May 2003. National Express East Anglia fulfilled a commitment to extend the bay platform at Cheshunt to accommodate eight-coach trains; previously, it could only accommodate six coaches. The works also involved replacing all existing station buildings and the station footbridge. Construction commenced in December 2005 and was largely completed by August 2006.

Ticket barriers were installed in 2011. The through platforms (1 and 2) were extended to accommodate 12-coach trains in December 2011, though initially no 12-coach trains were scheduled to call. Abellio was awarded a two-year contract to operate the Greater Anglia franchise; it commenced operations in February 2012. During the 2012 Summer Olympics, Cheshunt and Waltham Cross stations were the main access point for the Broxbourne whitewater canoe and kayak slalom.

An Oyster card extension to Cheshunt was introduced in January 2013, with the station in London fare zone 8. The Liverpool Street–Cheshunt via Seven Sisters service was transferred from Abellio Greater Anglia to London Overground in May 2015. All other services remain with Greater Anglia. The London Overground service was branded 'Weaver line' in November 2024.

== Facilities ==
The station consists of two 12-car platforms and one 8-car bay platform used by Weaver line services. The modern station building is located on platform 1 and a footbridge links the two through platforms. The station is staffed every day, and a small coffee kiosk is located in the station building.

There are 78 spaces for bicycles and a 184-space car park provided. Buses pick up from outside the station.

== Services ==
The typical off-peak service of trains per hour (tph) is as follows:

Operator/line	Frequency to destination
Greater Anglia	2 tph London Liverpool Street (via Tottenham Hale) to Hertford East; 1 tph London Liverpool Street (via Tottenham Hale) to Cambridge North (semi-fast); 1 tph London Liverpool Street (via Tottenham Hale) to Cambridge North (all stations from Cheshunt); 2 tph Stratford to Bishops Stortford
London Overground (Weaver line)	2 tph London Liverpool Street (via Seven Sisters) to Cheshunt (all stations)

During peak periods, only services to/from Stansted Airport, (4tph) Bishops Stortford, (1tph) and Hertford East, (3tph) stop here. No Cambridge/Ely trains call.

Occasional Off-Peak Stansted Express trains also stop here.

On Sundays, the Stratford–Bishops Stortford services do not operate; the Hertford East services run to Stratford instead of Liverpool Street.

Preceding station	National Rail	Following station
Tottenham Hale	Greater Anglia West Anglia Main Line	Broxbourne
Waltham Cross	Greater Anglia West Anglia Main Line	Broxbourne
Preceding station	London Overground	Following station
Theobalds Grove towards Liverpool Street	Weaver line Weaver Lea Valley lines	Terminus
