= Longsight TMD =

Longsight TMD may refer to:

- Longsight Diesel TMD
- Longsight Electric TMD
- Manchester International Depot, also known as Longsight International TMD
