= British Rail Class 308 =

British class of electric multiple units

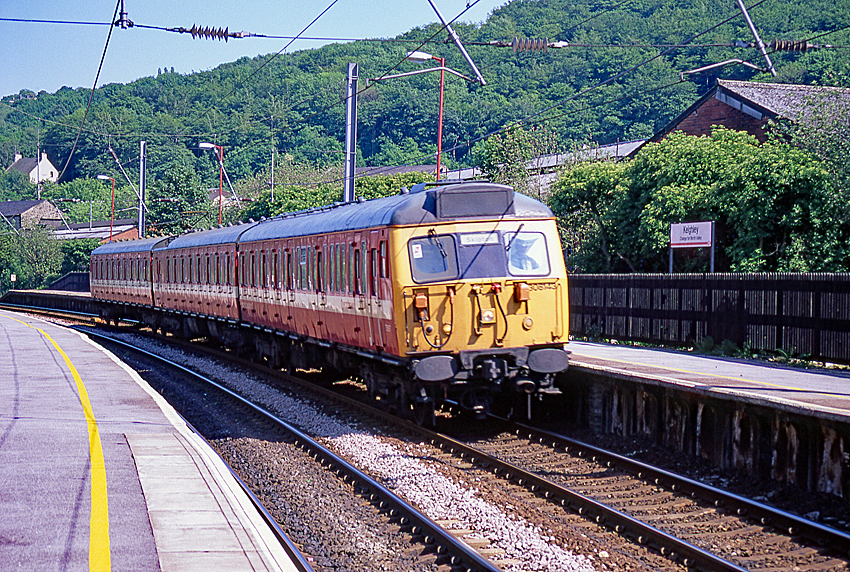
- A Class 308 in West Yorkshire PTE livery at Keighley, 1996
- In service: 1959–2001
- Manufacturer: British Railways
- Order nos.: 30652 (BDTCOL, 308/1); 30653 (MBSO, 308/1); 30654 (TCsoL, 308/1); 30655 (DTSO, 308/1); 30656 (BDTCOL, 308/1); 30657 (MBSO, 308/1); 30658 (TCsoL, 308/1); 30659 (DTSO, 308/1); 30694 (BDTSO, 308/3); 30695 (MBSO); 30696 (DTSO, 308/3); 30701 (MLV)
- Built at: Holgate Road, York
- Family name: 1959 EMU
- Replaced: Steam locomotives and carriages
- Refurbished: 1981–1983, 1994
- Number built: 45
- Number preserved: 1 (driving trailer only)
- Number scrapped: 44
- Successor: Class 321, Class 323, Class 333
- Formation: 3 or 4 cars per train set: BDTS+MBS+TC+DTS (308/1); BDTCOL+MBSO+TSOL+DTSO (308/1, refurbished); BDTS+MLV+TC+DTS (308/2); BDTSOL+MLV+DTLV (308/2, refurbished); BDTS+MBS+DTS (308/3)
- Diagram: ED207 (MBSO); ED216 (MBSO, 308/1); EE209 (DTSO, 308/3); EE220 (DTSO, 308/1); EF205 (BDTSO, 308/3); EF208 (BDTSOL, 308/1 as built); EF302 (BDTC); EF304 (BDTCOL, 308/1 refurbished); EH223 (TSOL, 308/1 refurbished); EH305 (TCsoL, 308/1 as built); EW501 (DTLV, 308/1); EY501 (MLV)
- Design code: AM8
- Fleet numbers: 133-165 (308/1, sets); 75878-75886, 75896-75919 (BDTS, 308/1); 61883-61915 (MBS, 308/1); 70611-70643 (TS, 308/1); 75887-75895, 75929-75952 (DTS, 308/1); 313-321 (308/2, sets); 75920-75928 (BDTS, 308/2); 68011-68019 (MLV, 308/2); 70644-70652 (TC, 308/2); 75953-75961 (DTS, 308/2); 453-455 (308/3, sets); 75741-75743 (BDTS, 308/3); 61689-61691 (MBS, 308/3); 75992-75994 (DTS, 308/3)
- Capacity: 19F/344S (308/1, as built); 19F/248S (308/2); 272S (308/3); 24F/302S (308/1, refurbished)
- Operator: British Rail
- Depots: Clacton, East Ham, Ilford

Specifications
- Car body construction: Steel
- Train length: 268 ft 8 1/2 in (81.902 m) (4-car); 189 ft 9 1/2 in (57.849 m) (3-car)
- Car length: 64 ft 0 5/8 in (19.523 m) (driving cars, over body); 63 ft 6 in (19.35 m) (others)
- Width: 9 ft 3 in (2.82 m)
- Height: 12 ft 7 in (3.835 m)
- Doors: Slam
- Articulated sections: 4 (308/1, 308/2 as built); 3 (308/2 refurbished, 308/3)
- Wheelbase: 46 ft 6 in (14.17 m) (bogie centres)
- Maximum speed: 75 mph (121 km/h)
- Weight: 153 long tons (155 t) (308/1); 150 long tons 12 cwt (153.0 t) (308/2); 119 long tons (121 t) (308/3)
- Traction motors: 4 × EE 56A of 143.5 kW (192.4 hp)
- Power output: 574 kW (770 hp)
- HVAC: Electric
- Electric systems: 25 kV 50 Hz AC OHLE; 6.25 kV AC OHLE
- Current collection: Pantograph
- UIC classification: 3-car: 2′2′+Bo′Bo′+2′2′; 4-car: 2′2′+Bo′Bo′+2′2′+2′2′
- Bogies: Gresley ED5, Gresley ED8, Gresley ET5, Gresley ET8
- Braking system: Air (EP/Auto)
- Safety system: AWS
- Coupling system: Buckeye (outer), Solid shank (inner)
- Multiple working: Within ER EMU stock, later only within the class
- Track gauge: 1,435 mm (4 ft 8 1/2 in) standard gauge

The British Rail Class 308 alternating current (AC) electric multiple units were built between 1959 and 1961 by British Railways' Holgate Road carriage works, in York, England. They were manufactured in three batches, initially classified as AM8 units before the introduction of TOPS.

== Description ==
=== Class 308/1 ===
The first batch of 33 units were built in 1959, classified as AM8 and numbered 133–165. This was later changed to Class 308/1 under TOPS and units were renumbered 308133–165. These units were built to operate commuter services on the Great Eastern Main Line (GEML) from London Liverpool Street to Shenfield, Witham, Colchester, Walton-on-the-Naze and Clacton. Each unit was formed of four carriages: two outer driving trailers, an intermediate trailer and a motor coach.

Electrically, the Class 308 has the same equipment as the Class 302 units with a few modifications; some of these are the types of overload, the use of fan-cooled rectifier continued until the rectifiers were modified to eight-diode type from 1982. This modified main rectifier was also used on the Class 309 stock, due to the problems of fan-cooled types, suffering from blocked filters, causing failures in traffic. The braking system is basically the same as the Class 302 units, with the exception of the motor coach retaining the 16 in (406.4 mm) cylinder rather than the 12 in (304.8 mm), after replacing the cast-iron brake blocks with composite Ferodo type.

From 1981 to 1983, the units were refurbished, which included opening out compartments, fitting of gangways between carriages, and moving first class seating from the intermediate trailer to one of the driving trailers. It had the same problems as the Class 302s of having first class passengers sitting above the Westinghouse CM38 compressor; however, the Gresley bogies were retained. In this modified form, the technical description of the formation was BDTCOL+MBSO+TSOL+DTSO. Individual carriages were numbered as follows:

- BDTCOL: 75878-75886 and 75896-75919
- MBSO: 61883-61915
- TSOL: 70611-70643
- DTSO: 75887-75895 and 75929-75952.

=== Class 308/2 ===
A second batch of nine units, numbered 313–321, were built for boat train services on the London, Tilbury and Southend line (LTS) in 1959–60, from London Fenchurch Street to Tilbury Riverside. These units were later reclassified as Class 308/2 under TOPS. Each unit was formed of four carriages: two outer driving trailers, an intermediate trailer and a motor luggage van; with the reduction in luggage space, some MLVs were converted at Swindon Works with a different seating arrangement to the original passenger vehicles. The technical description of the formation was BDTS+MLV+TC+DTS. Individual carriages were numbered as follows:

- BDTS: 75920-75928
- MLV: 68011-68019 (68011 - 68014 from units 313-316 converted to MBSO in 1971 and renumbered 62431–62434. Units reclassified as Class 308/4)
- TC: 70644-70652
- DTS: 75953-75961.

When Tilbury Docks closed as a cruise liner terminal, these units were made redundant and withdrawn from service in 1983. Three units were subsequently rebuilt as Class 308/4 parcels sector units for Rail Express Systems.

=== Class 308/3 ===
Finally, a third batch of three-car units were built in 1961 for suburban services from London Liverpool Street to Chingford and Enfield Town. They were numbered 453–455, following on from the Class 305/1 units, which also operated these services and were numbered in the range 401–452.

These units were later reclassified as Class 308/3 and renumbered 308453–455 under TOPS. Unlike the first batch, these units contained no first-class seating. Each unit was formed of three carriages: two outer driving trailers and an intermediate motor coach. The technical description of the unit formation was BDTS+MBS+DTS. Individual carriages numbers were as follows:

- BDTS: 75741-75743
- MBS: 61689-61691
- DTS: 75992-75994.

These units were withdrawn in the late 1980s.

=== Converted postal units ===
In 1983, three former Class 308/2 units (nos. 314/19/21) were converted into Class 308/4 postal units by the Parcels sector; the intermediate trailers were removed and renumbered 308991–3. These units were replaced by three converted Class 302/9 parcels units in 1992.

== Operations ==
By the early 1990s, only the Class 308/1 units were still in service. These were gradually replaced on Great Eastern services by the new Class 321s. Some of the displaced units were transferred to the LTS, whilst others were transferred to the West Midlands to work Cross-City Line services pending the introduction of new Class 323s. The LTS units were later displaced by Class 312s, but two were retained and converted to Class 937 sandite units. These sandite units were originally fitted with a small cement mixer that was used to mix the sandite and then loaded into the hoppers whilst the vehicle was in motion. Later, premixed sandite was loaded prior to use with the easing of the physical work by the staff.

In 1994–95, electrification spread north from Leeds to Bradford Forster Square, Skipton and Ilkley. As no new stock had been ordered, Regional Railways overhauled Class 308 units for use on these services. The work was carried out at Doncaster Works and involved reducing the unit length to three carriages, with the removal of the intermediate trailers, which were scrapped. The trains were also painted in West Yorkshire Metro crimson and cream livery.

In 1996, with the privatisation of British Rail, the Class 308 fleet passed into the ownership of Angel Trains and were leased to the Regional Railways North East franchise. This was originally operated as Northern Spirit, but the franchise was later taken over by Arriva and operated as Arriva Trains Northern.

By the late 1990s, it was clear that the elderly Class 308 units needed replacing as they were increasingly unreliable and expensive to maintain. They were replaced by 16 new three-car Class 333 units, which were introduced from 12 January 2001; all units were lengthened subsequently to four-car sets.

The Class 308 units were withdrawn and sent for storage at MoD Shoeburyness, in Essex. The final three units, nos. 308138/57/58, were withdrawn in late 2001 and were sent for scrap at Immingham, in Lincolnshire. Since then, the stored units were slowly scrapped at various locations, with the final vehicles disposed of in 2004. Only one carriage was saved for preservation.

== Incident ==
- On 14 February 1990, an empty stock train formed of Classes 305 and 308 units was derailed at East Ham.

== Preservation ==
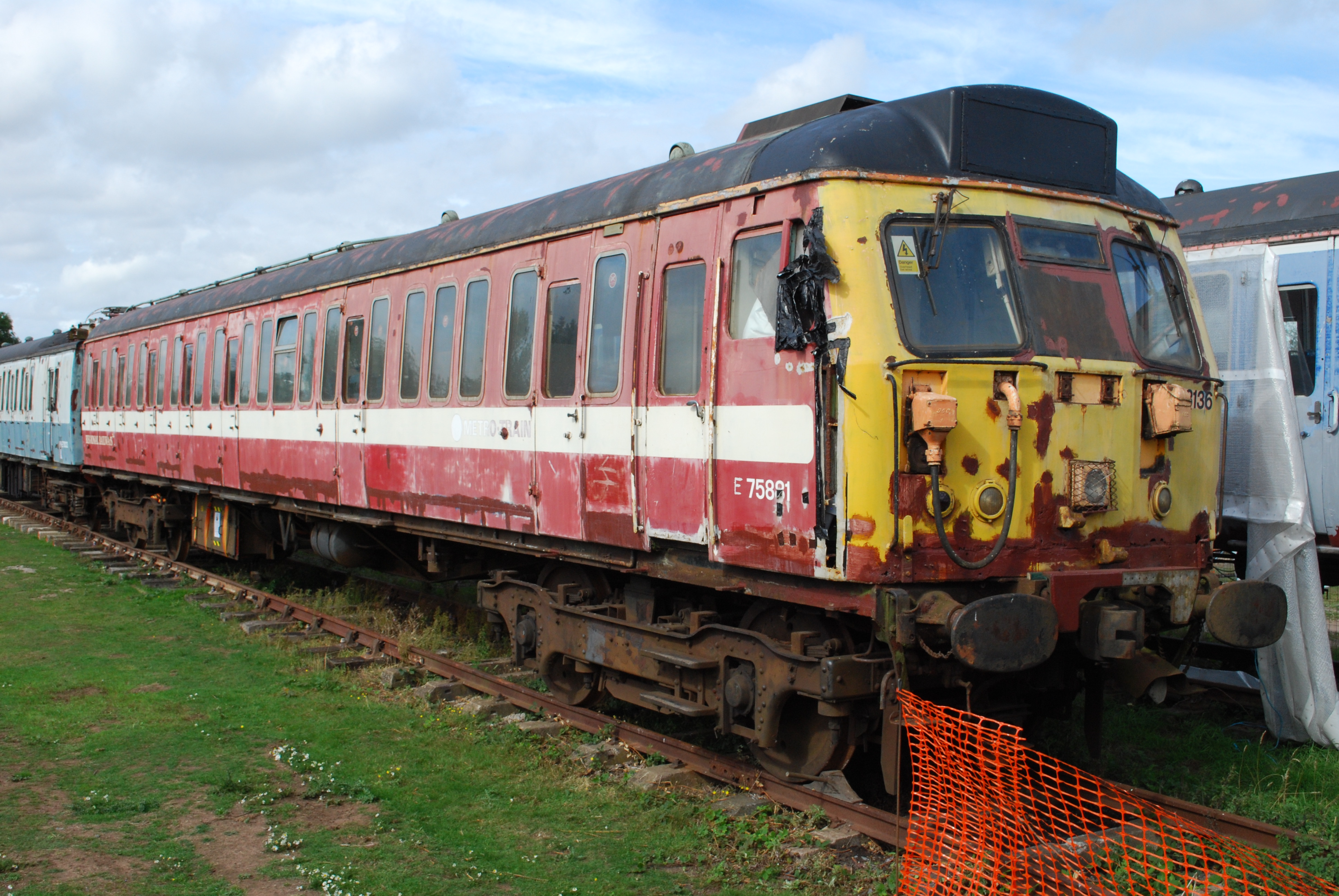
The driving trailer of 308 136 at the Electric Railway Museum in Coventry, its previous home

One driving trailer from unit 308 136 was saved for preservation: 75881. It is stored at the Colne Valley Railway, in Essex; its restoration is ongoing.

The carriage has been stripped of asbestos. The planned full internal rebuild was abandoned in favour of housing the salvaged parts of the London Underground Victoria Line's Cobourg Street signalling centre and much of the former Brixton interlocking machine room equipment. The Cobourg Street equipment is now partially working, with work ongoing to allow simulated train movements to be displayed.

== Fleet details ==
Class	Route	No. built	Year built	Cars per set	Unit nos.		Withdrawn
Class	Route	No. built	Year built	Cars per set	Original	Later	Withdrawn
Class 308/1	Great Eastern	33	1959	4	133–165	308133–165	2001
Class 308/2	LTS	9	1959-60	4	313–321	—	1983
Class 308/3	Great Eastern	3	1961	3	453–455	308453–455	late-1980s
Class 308/4	Postal units (ex-Class 308/2)	3	Rebuilt 1983	3	(ex-314/319/321)	308991–993	1992
