= British Rail Class 304 =

British class of electric multiple units

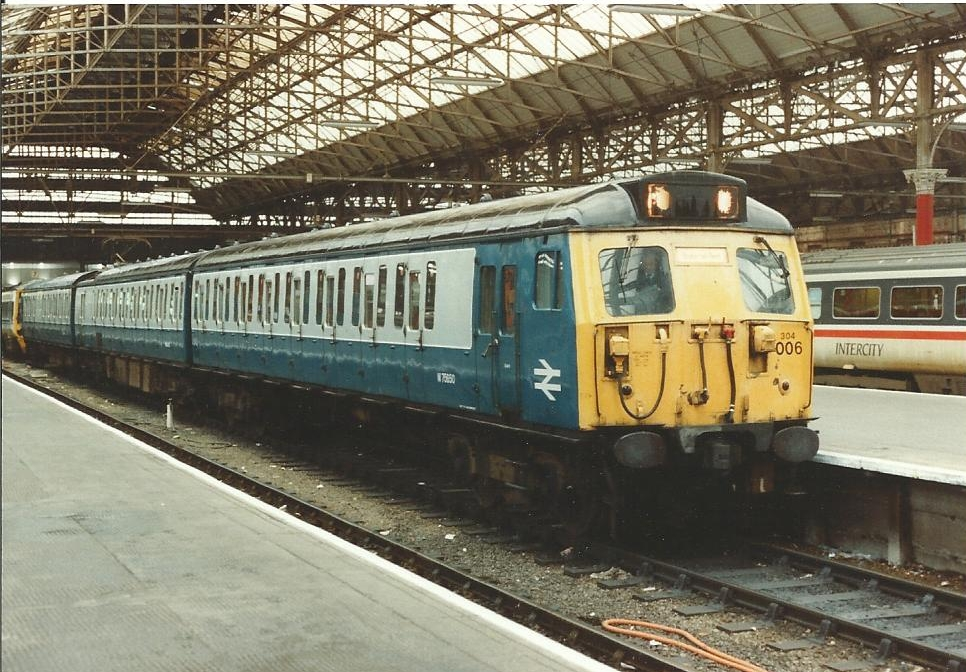
- Class 304 at Manchester Piccadilly in 1992
- In service: 1960–31 March 1996
- Manufacturer: British Railways
- Order nos.: Class 304/1: 30428 (MBS); 30429 (BDTSOL); 30430 (DTBSO); 30431 (TCsoL); Class 304/2: 30607 (MBSO); 30608 (DTBSO); 30609 (TCsoL); 30610 (BDTSOL); Class 304/3: 30642 (MBSO); 30643 (DTBSO); 30644 (TCsoL); 30645 (BDTSOL)
- Built at: Wolverton Works
- Family name: BR First Generation EMU
- Refurbished: 1984–86
- Scrapped: 1985–98
- Number built: 45
- Number scrapped: 45
- Successor: Class 323
- Formation: 4 cars per unit (as built): BDTSOL+MBS+TCsoL+DTBSO; 3 cars per unit (1984-96): BDTSOL+MBSO+DTBSO
- Diagram: As built Class 304/1: 408 MBS; 411 DTBSO; 434 BDTSOL; 456 TCsoL; Class 304/2 & 304/3: 409 MBSO; 412 DTBSO; 435 BDTSOL; 457 TCsoL; TOPS codes Class 304/1: ED202.0A MBS (as built); ED205.0A MBSO (refurbished); EF203.0A BDTSOL; EG202.0A DTBSO; EH303.0A TCsoL; Class 304/2 & 304/3: ED203.0A MBSO; EF204.0A BDTSOL; EG203.0A DTBSO; EH304.0A TCsoL
- Design code: AM4
- Fleet numbers: Class 304/1: 304001-015; 75045-75059 BDTSOL; 61045-61059 MBS; 70045-70059 TCsoL; 75645-75659 DTBS; Class 304/2: 304016-035; 75680-75699 BDTSOL; 61628-61647 MBSO; 70483-70502 TCsoL; 75660-75679 DTBS; Class 304/3: 304036-045; 75868-75877 BDTSOL; 61873-61882 MBSO; 70243-70252 TCsoL; 75858-75867 DTBS
- Capacity: As built 4-car: 318 standard + 19 first (304/1); 294 standard + 19 first (304/2 and 304/3); Refurbished 3-car: 246 standard (304/1); 236 standard (304/2 and 304/3)
- Operator: British Rail
- Depots: Crewe Electric; Longsight
- Lines served: West Coast Main Line; Crewe to Manchester Line; Crewe to Liverpool Line; Manchester, South Junction and Altrincham Railway; Chase Line

Specifications
- Train length: 4-car formation: 253 ft 8 in (77.32 m); 3-car formation: 190 ft 3 in (57.99 m)
- Car length: 63.42 ft 5 in (19.46 m)
- Width: 9 ft 3 in (2.82 m)
- Height: 12 ft 8 3/4 in (3.880 m)
- Doors: Slam door
- Articulated sections: 4 (as built); 3 (refurbished)
- Maximum speed: 75 mph (121 km/h)
- Weight: Total: 151.85 long tons (154.29 t; 170.07 short tons)
- Traction motors: 4 × BTH
- Power output: 620 kW (830 hp)
- Electric system: 25 kV 50 Hz AC (OHLE)
- Current collection: Pantograph
- UIC classification: 4-car: 2′2′+Bo′Bo′+2′2′+2′2′; 3-car: 2′2′+Bo′Bo′+2′2′
- Bogies: Gresley ED4 (MBS/MBSO); Gresley ET8 (BDTSOL/DTBSO/TCsoL)
- Braking system: Air (EP/Auto)
- Coupling system: Drophead buckeye (outer); Solid shank Alliance no. 2 (inner)
- Multiple working: Within class and other pre-1972 25kV EMUs
- Track gauge: 1,435 mm (4 ft 8 1/2 in) standard gauge

The British Rail Class 304 (originally classed as AM4) were AC electric multiple units designed and produced at British Rail's (BR) Wolverton Works, in Buckinghamshire, England. The class was produced for BR's new electric suburban services, enabled by the first phases of the West Coast Main Line electrification between Crewe and Manchester/Liverpool/Rugby. The units conformed to the 1959-design for alternating current (AC) electrical multiple units; they were very similar externally to the Class 305, Class 308 and the 1,200V direct current (DC) Class 504, units.

Following their introduction during the early 1960s, Class AM4s could be found in operation across the southern and Midland section of the West Coast Main Line. Midway through their service life, the units were reclassified as the Class 304, under the TOPS numbering system. The fleet was withdrawn from service during the early-to-mid 1990s, largely due to the arrival of cascaded rolling stock such as the Class 305/2 and new Class 323 units. Despite efforts to do so, no units survived into preservation, with all units being eventually scrapped.

== Production ==
The first 15 units were delivered to Longsight depot, in Manchester, from April 1960 as four-car sets; they were originally numbered 001-015. Built by BR's Wolverton Works, these units were an aesthetic improvement over the AM2 (Class 302) units built previously at York and Doncaster. They featured a new design cab end with a raked back upper area, following a design panel recommendation, and emerged in Multiple Unit Green livery, lined out with yellow. Having been immediately preceded on the Wolverton production line by the two-car 1,200V DC Class 504 units, a considerably high number of design features were shared between the Class 504 and the first AM4 units.

During 1961, production of a further 20 units followed, numbered 016-035; these were intended for the Crewe-Liverpool service which commenced on New Year's Day 1962. Although this local service only required three or four units daily, they were principally used elsewhere, for services around Manchester and Birmingham. These units differed from the first batch by having a slightly different body design, with wide saloon windows replacing the narrow compartment-style windows. The motor brake vehicles had a different internal layout, with 72 second class seats in q saloon layout. This improved layout was adopted for the final batch of AM4s, as well as later batches of AM5 (Class 305) and AM8 (Class 308) units.

The third and final batch of AM4 was another ten units, numbered 036-045, which were almost identical to the second batch and intended for use on the Crewe-Stafford section.

== Design ==
The Class 304s operated as inter-urban electric multiple unit (EMU) trains. Its design, which was principally devised to fulfil various requirements laid out by the British Transport Commission, was produced by a team headed by chief electrical engineer S.B. Warder and chief mechanical engineer I.F. Harrison.

The units were arranged into four-car sets, consisting of:

- Driving Trailer Brake Open vehicle, with 82 second class seats (saloon) and a guard's compartment
- Trailer Composite, with 19 first class seats (compartment), 60 second class seats (saloon) and two toilets
- Motor Brake, with 96 second class seats (compartment) and a guard's compartment
- Driving Trailer, with 82 second class seats (saloon), two toilets and battery equipment.

One result of the motor brake vehicle having a compartment design was that the window layout on all vehicles was designed to suit, having a narrow window either side of each door.

The body of the vehicle was constructed principally of welded steel. While 16-gauge sheet sections were used for areas such as the bodysides, ends and roof panels, thinner sections were used in a minority of areas. On some units, fibreglass was inserted into the interior spaces present in the sides, roof and ends, to provide both thermal insulation and soundproofing; on other units, asbestos was used instead. Additional insulation was sometimes installed beneath the floor panels and the corrugated aluminium floor plate. While much of the passenger compartment's interior finishing was a mixture of timber and plastic, light alloys were used for several elements, such as the doors and luggage racks.

The electrical systems of the Class 304 were largely supplied by a single company, the British manufacturing group Associated Electrical Industries (AEI). Powered at 25 kV AC via catenary, a single pantograph mounted directly above the guard's compartment of the motor brake vehicle gathered current from the overhead catenary, which was transferred via a rubber insulated cable from the roof directly to the onboard transformer. This transformer, in combination with a germanium rectifier, stepped down the supplied current and converted it from AC to DC; the use of a germanium rectifier was a novel feature of the type. This system incorporated an automated power control system and voltage selection circuit. The main transformer also supplied an auxiliary feed at 240 V for powering miscellaneous systems on board the train, including the heating units. While the transformer has its own oil-based cooling system, a fan-driven arrangement kept the rectifiers within a safe operating temperature, although relatively little temperature restrictions were present as a consequence of its solid-state nature.

The vast majority of the electrical equipment was installed within bays mounted on the underframe, aside from a single cabinet in the guard's compartment that contained a fuse panel, fault indicator panel, equipment cutout switches and auxiliary equipment. While most apparatus were installed beneath the motor trailer, including the four AEI-supplied traction motors, the underframe of the driving trailer accommodated some equipment as well, such as the main air compressor, air reservoirs, brake cylinder and nickel–iron battery units. The rate of acceleration was regulated by a relay that intentionally limited the current. Furthermore, the camshaft would only move when the reverser is set and the motor contacts closed. The motors were protected by an automated cutoff that activated under several circumstances, including excessive oil temperatures, earthing faults, overload and air supply failure.

The cab was designed to provide the driver with an excellent external view, as well as to be aesthetically pleasing. Glass panels covered the cab's forward section down to waist height, while a pair of fully-adjustable seats, for the driver and assistant motorman, were mounted directly upon the rear bulkhead. The driver's instrumentation was fitted upon a sloped panel behind a flat desk lined with push buttons and light switches. To the driver's left was the brake controller while to the right was the master controller. Using the master controller, the driver could operate the vehicle's four motors either together or individually; the latter mode was intended primarily for slow speed shunting operations. The cab walls were lined with plastic panels while the floor was covered in linoleum. Access to the cab was via a single door centrally positioned in the rear bulkhead.

The underframe largely conformed to standard BR designs of the era. It was paired with double-bolster bogies through, which were furnished with knife-edge suspension. Braking was provided via an air-powered arrangement, which featured a self-lapping electro-pneumatic control actuated via a single cylinder. Only the outer ends of each unit featured oleo-pneumatic side-buffers and drop-head automatic couplers; instead, the interior ends of each car were equipped with fixed automatic couplers and lacing side buffers.

== Service history ==
Prior to the commencement of electric services between Crewe and Manchester, the AM4 class underwent a period of testing on the Styal line. They were the only AC units of the 1959 design to wear the lined-out version of Multiple Unit Green livery, with AM5/8 emerging in green. This appearance was lost, however, when repainted into all-over Rail Blue.

AM4s of the second batch unit numbers 016 to 023 were loaned to the Eastern Region for use between London Liverpool Street to Shenfield, Southend Victoria and Chelmsford, after the conversion of the route from 1,500V DC to 6.25kV/25kV (AC) while Class 306 and Class 307 units were being rebuilt to 6.25kV/25kV ac. Some of the second batch were also used briefly on the services from Liverpool Street to Hertford East and Bishops Stortford in the mid-1960s.

The AM4 units largely spent their whole careers operating on the following routes:

- Crewe to Manchester Piccadilly, via Stockport or Styal
- Altrincham to Manchester Piccadilly, via Sale
- Crewe to Liverpool Lime Street
- Crewe to Birmingham New Street
- Birmingham New Street to Rugby and Northampton.

Individual units were occasionally operated to London Euston, notably at the very beginning of electric services, before all the AM10 units were delivered; they were also noted at Preston on rare occasions. The units attained substantial mileage, due to their operation on much of the West Coast Main Line and their 75 mph (121 km/h) maximum speed each day on their workings, unlike those employed on suburban services elsewhere.

=== Refurbishment ===
Between 1984 and 1986, a refurbishment programme was carried out on the units. This included the removal and scrapping of the Trailer Composite vehicles, reducing the units to three-car formation and the conversion of the motor brake vehicles of the first batch (Class 304/1) to saloon layout, reducing seating capacity to 72. Unlike other EMU refurbishment programmes, the work carried out on Class 304 units did not include the fitting of inter-vehicle gangways or the complete replacement of internal fittings. This meant that original 1960s seats and trim remained in most vehicles, retaining something of their original character. The units were also repainted into blue and grey livery. The loss of one vehicle meant that the power-to-weight ratio of the units increased, thereby improving their performance.

=== Decline ===
During the 1980s, the units gradually received the Class 304 TOPS prefix to their unit numbers and, by 1992, several later series units had received Regional Railways livery. By this time, however, more recently refurbished Class 305/2 units had become available, displaced from the London, Tilbury and Southend line by Class 310s; with the imminent arrival of brand new Class 323 units, the Class 304s began to be withdrawn.

The end came for the type on 31 March 1996, with nos. 002 and 033 being the last units to be withdrawn. Known amongst enthusiasts as "Dinosaurs", due to their advancing age, the Class 304 followed their namesakes to extinction.

== Liveries ==
- British Railways Green (1960–c.1967)
- BR Blue (c.1967–c.1983), with a yellow rectangle on the cab front (Chromatic Blue), then all-yellow cab front
- BR Blue and Grey (c.1980–1996)
- Regional Railways (c.1992–1996), aircraft blue over white, with a light blue stripe at waist level.

== Preservation attempts ==
One unit, no. 021, was purchased for preservation in 1998 and was stored in sidings at Crewe. During this time, many windows were smashed, which, as a consequence of the cost of replacing them, led to the abandonment of the project. The long period of storage was due to the difficulty in finding a home on a preserved railway for EMU coaching stock; it thus became the last of its class to be scrapped in November 2000.
