= British Rail Class 302 =

British class of electric multiple units

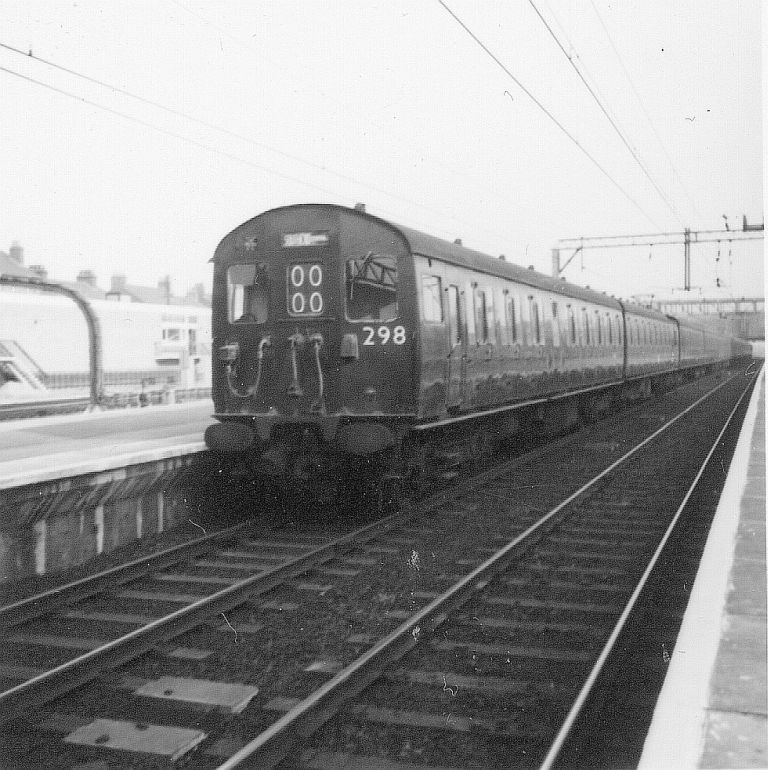
- A Class 302 unit at Barking (1964)
- In service: 1959–98
- Manufacturer: British Rail
- Order nos.: 30429 DTS, 75033-044 (1958-59); 30434 MBSO, 61060-096 (1958-59); 30435 DTS, 75060-084 (1959); 30436 DTSOL, 75085-100 (1958-59), 75190-210 (1959); 30437 TSsoL, 70060-095 (1958-59); 30438 MBSO, 61097-132 (1959), 61190-228 (1959-60); 30439 DTS, 75211-285 (1959-60); 30440 DTSOL, 75286-360 (1959-60); 30441 TSsoL, 70096-132 (1959), 70190-228 (1959-61)
- Built at: York Works, Doncaster Works
- Family name: BR First Generation EMU
- Constructed: 1958–59
- Refurbished: 49 facelifted (1982–84); 30 refurbished (1983-84); 4 parcels conversion (1989-90)
- Formation: Four cars per unit.; As built: DTSOL+MBS+TCsoL+DTS; Refurbished (82): DTCOL+MBSO+TSOL+DTSO
- Diagram: As built: 432 DTSOL; 405 MBS; 455 TCsoL; 433 DTS; TOPS codes, as built: EF201.0A DTSOL; ED205.0A MBS; EH302.0A TCsoL; EE205.0A DTS; Refreshed 1982-84: EF201.0B DTCOL; ED216.2C MBSO; EH223.0B TSO; EE223.0A DTSO; Refurbished 1983-84: EF303.0C DTCOL; ED217.0A MBSO; EH2230D TSO; EE219.0C DTSO; Ex-Class 504: EF215.0A DTSo; Parcels: EF501 DTPMV; ED501 MPMV; EE501 DTPMV
- Design code: AM2
- Fleet numbers: 302 201-312 (sets): 61060-132 / 61190-228 (MBS Later MBSO); 70060-132 / 70190-228 (TCsoL later TSOL); 75033-044 / 75060-084 (DTS later DTSO); 75085-100 / 75190-210 (DTSOL later DTCOL); 75211-285 (DTS later DTSO); 75286-320 (DTSOL later DTCOL)
- Capacity: 80S 2T (DTSOL); 24F 52S 1T (DTCOL) refurbished; 96S (MBS); 82S (MBSO) refurbished; 19F 60S 2T (TCsoL); 86S 2T (TSOL) refurbished; 108S (DTS); 88S (DTSO) refurbished
- Operators: British Rail; LTS Rail
- Depots: East Ham; Ilford; Clacton
- Lines served: LTS; GEML; WAML

Specifications
- Train length: 266 ft 7 in (81.25 m)
- Car length: 66 ft 6 in (20.27 m) MBS, TCsoL; 66 ft 9 1/2 in (20.36 m) BDTS, DTS
- Width: 9 ft 3 in (2.82 m)
- Height: 12 ft 7 in (3.84 m)
- Floor height: 3 ft 9 in (1.14 m)
- Maximum speed: 75 mph (121 km/h)
- Weight: Total: 157 t (155 long tons; 173 short tons); DTSOL: 39.5 t (38.9 long tons; 43.5 short tons); MBS: 55.3 t (54.4 long tons; 61.0 short tons); TCsoL: 34.4 t (33.9 long tons; 37.9 short tons); DTS: 33.4 t (32.9 long tons; 36.8 short tons)
- Traction motors: 4 × English Electric EE536A
- Power output: 4 × 192 hp (143 kW)
- Electric system: Originally 6.25 / 25kV AC overhead
- Current collection: Pantograph
- UIC classification: 2′2′+Bo′Bo′+2′2′+2′2′
- Braking system: Air (EP/Auto)
- Safety system: AWS
- Coupling system: Drophead buckeye (outer); Solid shank Alliance No.2 (inner)
- Multiple working: Within class and other pre-1972 25kV EMUs
- Track gauge: 1,435 mm (4 ft 8 1/2 in) standard gauge

The British Rail Class 302 (initially AM2) was a class of electric multiple units (EMUs) that was introduced between 1958 and 1960 for outer suburban passenger services on the London, Tilbury and Southend line (LTS). This class of multiple units was constructed with Mark 1 bodyshells, with slam-doors.

== Overview ==
Like all the Eastern Region AC EMUs of the period, they were equipped to operate on both 25 kV AC and the reduced 6.25 kV voltage in the inner London areas, where headroom for the overhead wires was reduced. On the LTS, the changeover point was just east of Barking station on both Upminster and Tilbury routes, with the link to Forest Gate being at 6.25kV AC.

Each unit was formed of four coaches, in the following formation:

- Driving Trailer Second Open with Lavatory (DTSOL)
- Motor Brake Second (MBS)
- Trailer Composite semi-open with Lavatory (TCsoL)
- Driving Trailer Second (DTS).

The initial set numbers were 201–312, later prefixed by the class number 302 upon introduction of TOPS from 1973.

The Battery Driving Trailer (BDT) and Driving Trailer (DT) were fitted with drop head buckeye couplers, with screw coupler in the guard's van; retractable buffers were also fitted only on outer ends of the BDT/DT.

== Service history ==
Public service started on 16 March 1959, with Class 302s working the first electric passenger trains between Colchester and Clacton at 25kV AC. A revised half hourly timetable started on 13 April from Colchester, with an eight-car train splitting at Thorpe-le-Soken with one unit going to Walton-on-Naze. (Note: Station names shown for Clacton and Walton are those that applied at the time; they have since changed.)

Some Class 302s were used for crew training in the Manchester area, before the Class 304 units were introduced there in April 1960.

They were among the first electric units delivered to the Eastern Region and, although ordered for the LTS electrification, a route they were long associated with, they were used initially on the London Liverpool Street to Hertford East, Bishop's Stortford and Enfield Town lines when they were electrified in November 1960. The 302s also stepped in when electrification was extended from Chelmsford to Colchester in 1961 and when the Class 305 units were having problems on the then new north-east London electric services. Some formations were temporarily reduced to three cars for the Enfield Town services.

The first 25 units remained on the Great Eastern Main Line for the bulk of their lives, with the remainder operating on the LTS from London Fenchurch Street from 1962.

Between November 1961 and June 1962, the class suffered traction motor insulation trouble, which meant the motors had to be rewound.

One unit, 302 312, was used as a test bed for silicon rectifier technology; a Brentford transformer from 1962 to 1964 was then used to test thyristor control equipment until 1972, becoming the first electric train so fitted in the UK.

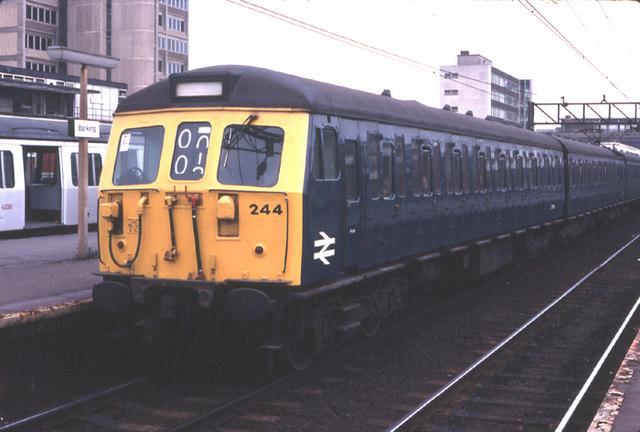
A Class 302 unit with a Class 504 DTSO

Unit 302 244 was involved in an accident in 1972 with a lorry at a level crossing at Low Street in Tilbury, after which it was decided to scrap the leading carriage, BDTC 75292. This was replaced with DTSO 77164, originally belonging to a Manchester-Bury Line Class 504. It remained like this until May 1983 when it acquired a spare BDTC, 75298, from withdrawn unit 302 250.

In 1987–88, suc units were short-formed with the removal of the trailer composite (TCsoL) and based at Ilford EMU Depot for work on the Great Eastern (GE) lines:

Unit number	Former number	BDTCO	MBSO	DTSO
302434	302234	75207	61093	75081
302439	302239	75287	61098	75212
302459	302259	75307	61118	75232
302462	302262	75310	61121	75235
302494	302294	75342	61210	75267
302497	302297	75345	61213	75282

Following the privatisation of British Rail, ownership of the last 30 units passed to Eversholt Rail Group with all units being leased by LTS Rail.

The run-down of Class 302s started in 1984, with the majority of units being phased out when Class 310 were introduced on to the LTS in 1988. The last 30 units were withdrawn by 1998, with the introduction of Class 317s in 1997 and some Class 312s in 1998.

== Electrical equipment ==
Electrical equipment was supplied by English Electric, with the majority of equipment being interchangeable with Class 308 units.

There were three main electrical systems:

- Control, which operated at 110 volts DC, provided by nickel iron alkaline secondary cells
- Auxiliary 250 V AC from the tertiary winding of the main transformer, which provided power to the battery charger which was also rectified to power the main compressor
- Power circuits derived from the secondary winding of the main transformer at 1,500 V AC.

The primary winding of the transformer was designed to operate on either 6.25 or 25 kV with voltage sensing equipment fitted to ensure the correct arrangement of primary windings for a given voltage. An incorrect voltage selection device was fitted to both Classes 302 and 308 stock so that, if the primary winding were connected for 6.25 kV when supplied with 25 kV, the air blast circuit breaker manufactured by Brown Boveri would remain closed, but the pantograph would be lowered. Should this happen, the transformer would require changing and an overhaul, as well as possibly other equipment, due to flashover damage.

The transformer was also protected by a Buchholz relay, which monitored any gas build-up within the cooling/insulating oil, as the acetylene (ethyne) gas generated is highly explosive. All Class 302 and 308 stocks were fitted with Stone Faiveley pantographs for current collection from the overhead line. A particular oddity of Eastern/Anglian region EMU stock was the fitting of fibreglass snow shields between the pantograph and the supporting insulators.

One member of the class, 302 302, was experimentally fitted with thyristor control in the early 1970s. After the experiment, it was converted back to the original tap changer control, although the guard's van remained slightly different internally.

== Refurbished units ==
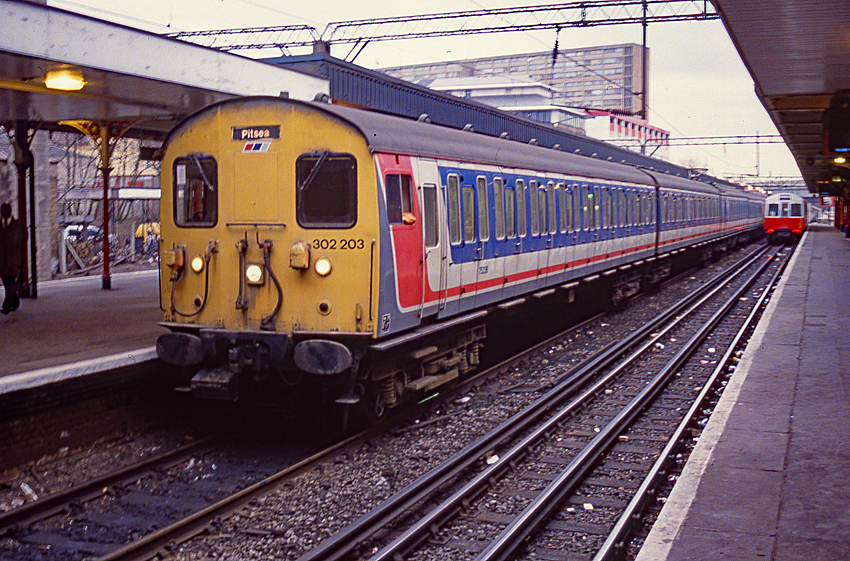
A Class 302 unit at Barking on a service to Pitsea (1993)

Upon refurbishment, the trailer coaches were fitted with B5 bogies for both driving ends, along with conversions of the Battery Driving Second Open (BDTSOL) to a Battery Driving Trailer Composite Open (BDTCOL); this took place after having moved the first-class accommodation to a position over the Westinghouse CM38 main compressor, which was noisy and caused vibration. Driving Standard Compartments were converted to Driving Standard Open DTSOs, having removed the compartments for an open layout. The centre trailer had B4 bogies fitted, with the Trailer Composite Semi Open (TCSOL) design converted to Trailer Standard Open (TSOL). The motor coach retained its Gresley-derived bogies after refurbishment, with compartments removed for an open layout with a guards van. All 30 units would also receive gangway connections between cars within the unit.

The vehicles were insulated originally with blue asbestos, which was removed and sealed during refurbishment between 1982 and 1984; some of the compartments were removed and reconfigured to open saloons.

Units that received the original facelift with just Motor Brake Second (MBS) and the Driving Trailer Second (DTS), having their compartments removed for an open layout with the (TCSOL) not receiving any layout changes and keeping the Gresley bogies were: 202, 204, 205, 213, 215, 216, 217, 218, 220, 225, 226, 227, 228, 231, 232, 234, 236, 239, 245, 251, 252, 254, 259, 261, 262, 263, 274, 277, 279, 280, 283, 284, 285, 292, 293, 297, 298, 299, 300, 301, 303, 304, 307, 308 and 311.

The 30 units that received the full refurbishment, and would last until withdrawal of the class from service on the LTS, were:

Unit number	Former number	BDTCO	MBSO	TSO	DTSO	Unit number	Former number	BDTCO	MBSO	TSO	DTSO
302201		75085	61060	70060	75033	302216		75100	61075	70075	75063
302202		75086	61061	70061	75034	302217		75190	61076	70076	75064
302203	302263	75311	61122	70122	75236	302218		75191	61077	70077	75065
302204		75088	61063	70063	75036	302219		75192	61078	70078	75066
302205		75089	61064	70064	75037	302220		75193	61079	70079	75067
302206		75090	61065	70065	75038	302221		75194	61080	70080	75068
302207	302310	75358	61226	70226	75283	302222		75195	61081	70081	75069
302208	302308	75356	61224	70224	75281	302223	302293	75341	61209	70209	75266
302209		75093	61068	70068	75041	302224		75197	61083	70083	75071
302210		75094	61069	70069	75042	302225		75198	61084	70084	75072
302211		75095	61070	70070	75043	302226		75199	61085	70085	75073
302212		75096	61071	70071	75044	302227	302277	75325	61193	70193	75250
302213		75097	61072	70072	75060	302228		75201	61087	61087	75075
302214	302304	75352	61220	70220	75277	302229		75202	61088	70088	75076
302215		75099	61074	70074	75062	302230	302232	75205	61091	70091	75079

== Class 302/9: non-passenger conversions ==
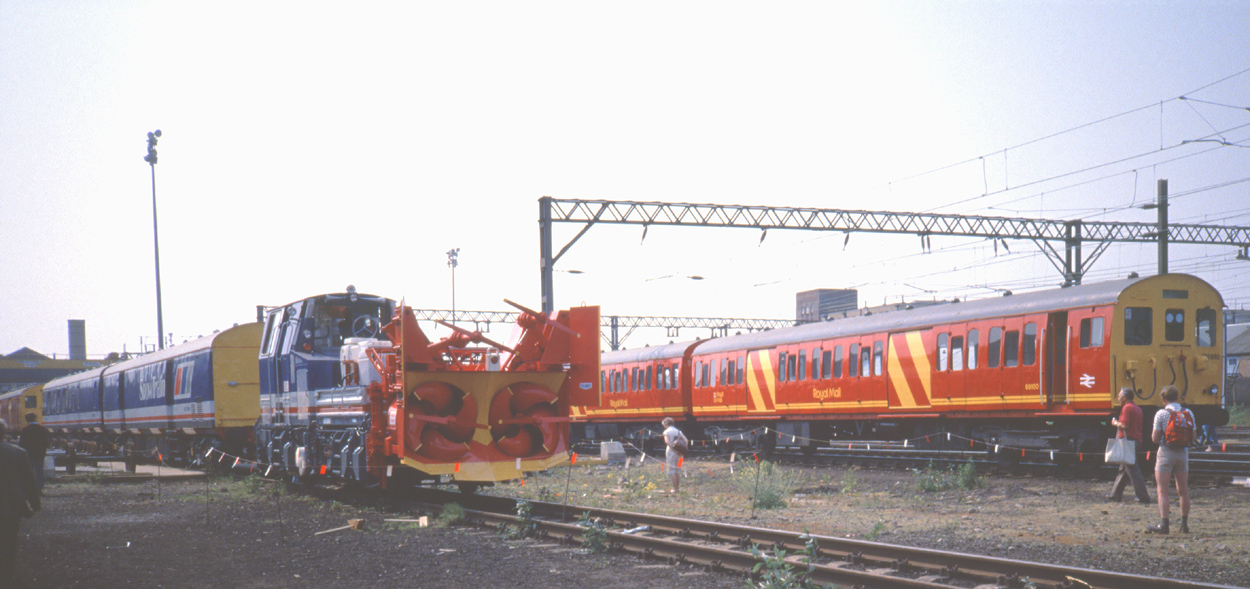
A Class 302 unit in Royal Mail red at Ilford (1989)

The sub-classification 302/9 was used for seven non-passenger carrying conversions.

=== Parcels units ===
Units 302 990-993 were reduced to three cars and converted for use as Royal Mail parcels units, with the addition of bodyside roller shutter doors; they were repainted into their red and yellow livery.

Unit number	BDTPMV	Former number	MPMV	Former number	DTPMV	Former number
302990	68100	(75084)	68020	(61090)	68207	(75082)
302991	68101	(75221)	68021	(61067)	68208	(75217)
302992	68102	(75220)	68022	(61227)	68209	(75218)
302993	68105	(75078)	68023	(61222)	68213	(75074)

=== Departmental sandite units ===
Units 302 996-998 were also reduced to three cars and were used as departmental sandite rail treatment units, later being reclassified as Class 937.

Unit number	DT	Former number	MB	Former number	DT	Former number
(937)996	ADB977598	(75080)	ADB977599	(61073)	ADB977600	(75061)
(937)997	ADB977601	(75211)	ADB977602	(61228)	ADB977603	(75035)
(937)998	ADB977604	(75077)	ADB977605	(61062)	ADB977606	(75070)

== Liveries ==
When introduced, the units were outshopped in plain British Rail (BR) EMU suburban green livery, with the early lion and wheel crest on the MBS. In 1962, a small yellow end became mandatory for all units. In the mid-1960s, Rail Blue, also known as Monastral blue, was applied to 112 members of the fleet. From 1968, a full yellow end became mandatory to increase visibility for permanent way staff on the track.

From 1982, when refreshed units were released from the works, they were painted in the then-standard BR blue and grey livery. The first member of the class to receive Network SouthEast livery was 302 217 by 1987, which was the sole example until 1990–1993 when it was applied to the 30 remaining class members. Unrefurbished unit 302 207, later renumbered 302 200, received the original green livery with a small yellow panel in 1987.

== Preservation ==
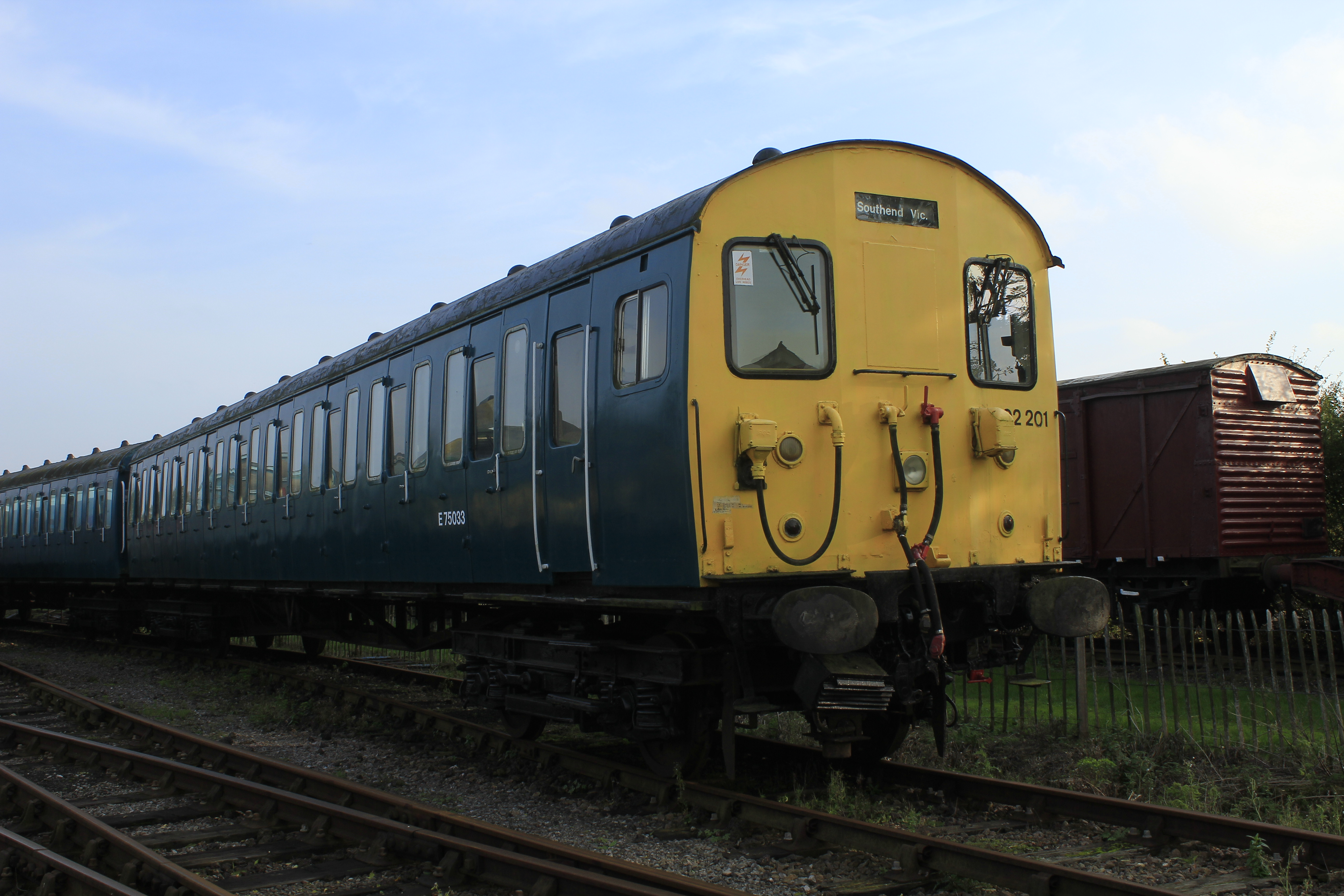
The preserved driving trailer of 302 201 (2019)

Two driving trailers, 75033 and 75250, which belonged to units 302 201 and 227, are preserved at Mangapps Railway Museum, near Burnham-on-Crouch, in Essex. These units have been repainted into BR overall blue with yellow ends; they are still in very good condition, including working destination scrolls, the seats in BR colours and the Network SouthEast maps. The rest of the fleet has been scrapped since withdrawal in late 1999.
