= British Rail Class 323 =

British electric passenger trains

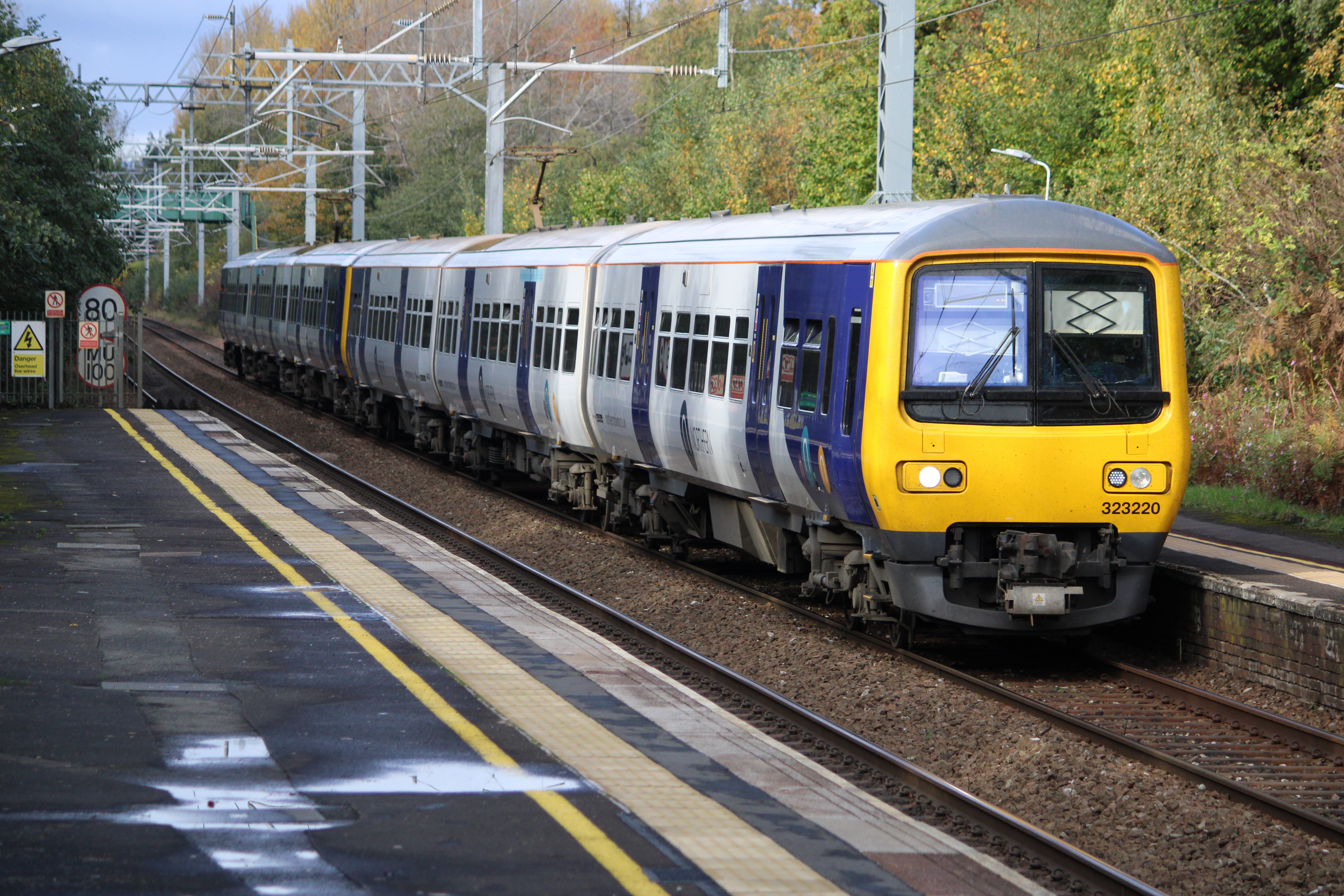
- Northern Trains Class 323 at Kearsley

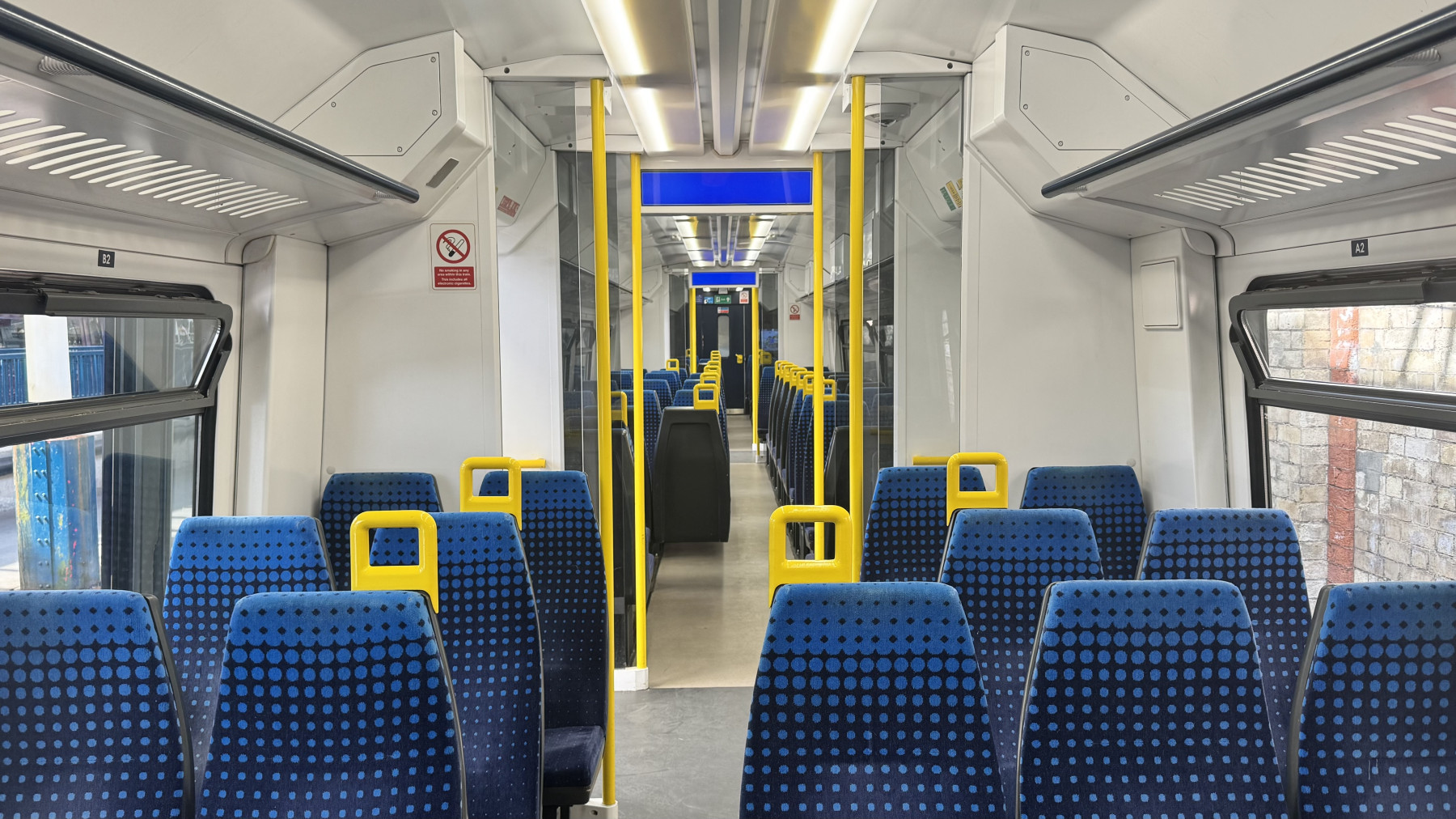
- Interior of a refurbished Arriva Rail North Class 323 unit
- Stock type: Electric multiple unit
- In service: 7 February 1994 – present
- Manufacturers: Hunslet Transportation Projects; Holec Ridderkerk UK (Note: Hunslet Transportation Projects Limited (HTPL) sold its Birmingham-based design, engineering, and project management functions – including responsibility for the Class 157 and 323 contracts – to the Dutch electrical engineering firm Holec in March 1994.)
- Order nos.: DMS vehicles: 31112 & 31114; PTS vehicles: 31113
- Built at: Leeds, United Kingdom (Note: Assembly); Raimeca, France (Note: Bodyshells only)
- Replaced: Class 116; Class 304; Class 305; Class 308; Class 309; Class 310; Class 312
- Constructed: 1992–1995
- Refurbished: 2011–2013; 2018–2021
- Number built: 43
- Number in service: 34
- Successor: Class 350/2 (Northern Trains); Class 730 (West Midlands Trains)
- Formation: 3 cars per unit: DMS-TS-DMS
- Diagram: DMS vehicles: EA272; TS vehicles: EH296
- Fleet numbers: 323201–323243
- Capacity: As built: 284 seats; Refurbished: 277 seats
- Owner: Porterbrook
- Operators: Current: Northern Trains; Former: Central Trains; First North Western; London Midland; Northern Rail; Regional Railways; West Midlands Trains
- Depots: Current: Allerton (Liverpool); Ardwick (Manchester); Future: Manchester International; Former: Bletchley (Milton Keynes); Longsight (Manchester); Oxley (Wolverhampton; Soho (Birmingham)
- Lines served: Current: Crewe–Manchester line; Glossop line; Stafford–Manchester line; Chat Moss line; Liverpool–Wigan line; Future: Manchester Victoria-Stalybridge; Former: Cross-City Line

Specifications
- Car body construction: Aluminium alloy
- Train length: 70.18 m (230 ft 3 in)
- Car length: DMS vehs.: 22.810 m (74 ft 10.0 in); TS vehs.: 22.840 m (74 ft 11.2 in)
- Width: 2.800 m (9 ft 2.2 in)
- Height: 3.769 m (12 ft 4.4 in)
- Floor height: 1.156 m (3 ft 9.5 in)
- Doors: Double-leaf sliding plug, each 1.305 m (4 ft 3.4 in) wide (2 per side per car)
- Wheel diameter: 840-775 mm
- Wheelbase: Over bogie centres: 16.000 m (52 ft 5.9 in)
- Maximum speed: 90 mph (145 km/h)
- Axle load: Route Availability 3
- Traction system: As built: Holec HPD GTO-VVVF; Post-2016: Alstom IGBT-VVVF (Note: The Alstom IGBT system delivers improved reliability, though – in order to avoid the need for expensive recertification – it is configured to emulate as exactly as possible the control and electromagnetic interference characteristics of the original system.)
- Traction motors: 8 × Holec DMKT 52/24 (Note: The Holec DMKT 52/24 is an asynchronous squirrel-cage induction motor. Power: 146 kW. Maximum speed: 4210 min^{−1})
- Power output: 1,168 kW (1,566 hp) total
- Gear ratio: 84 : 19
- Acceleration: 0.77 m/s^{2}
- Deceleration: Service: 0.71 m/s^{2} Emergency: 1.17 m/s^{2}
- Electric system: 25 kV 50 Hz AC Overhead
- Current collection: Pantograph (Brecknell Willis)
- UIC classification: Bo′Bo′+2′2′+Bo′Bo′
- Bogies: DMS vehicles: RFS BP62; TS vehicles: RFS BT52 (Note: Both types of bogie are derived from the British Rail Engineering Limited (BREL) BT13 design. RFS Industries was formed in 1987 through a buy-out by former BREL managers of British Rail's Doncaster Wagon Works.)
- Braking systems: Westcode EP (disc) and regenerative (Note: The regenerative system is the primary brake for the train in normal operation, blended with the friction brakes as required. Emergency braking uses the friction brakes alone, at a force 30% above the normal 'full service' application.)
- Safety systems: AWS; TPWS; (plus provision for BR ATP)
- Coupling system: Tightlock
- Multiple working: Within class (max. 4 units)
- Track gauge: 1,435 mm (4 ft 8 1/2 in) standard gauge

Notes/references
- Sourced from Webber 1999 unless otherwise noted.

The British Rail Class 323 is a class of electric multiple unit (EMU) passenger train built by Hunslet Transportation Projects and Holec. All 43 units were built from 1992 through to 1995, although mockups and prototypes were built and tested in 1990 and 1991.

Entering service in 1994, the 323s were among the last trains to enter service with British Rail before its privatisation in the mid-1990s. The units were designed to operate on inner-suburban commuter lines in and around Birmingham and Manchester with swift acceleration and high reliability.

The units are known for their rapid acceleration, being some of the fastest-accelerating trains on the UK rail network. Of the 43 units built, 34 are in service with Northern Trains, with the remaining 9 being in storage.

It was envisaged the Class 323 were to continue in service until beyond 2030 before being replaced by new build trains as part of Northern Trains fleet modernisation scheme, however the Class 323s are expected to be withdrawn by 2030 and replaced by refurbished Class 350/2s.

== Background ==
In 1990, the Regional Railways sector of British Rail tendered an order for new EMUs, both to replace older electric units around Birmingham and Manchester, and to work services on the newly electrified Birmingham Cross-City Line. In June 1990, the contract was awarded to Hunslet Transportation Projects of Birmingham, a new company set up by a team of engineers and managers who had left Metro-Cammell, a Birmingham-based train manufacturer at the time. It won the contract in competition with six other European train builders. The trains were designed in Birmingham, but built and fitted out at the Hunslet works in Leeds, with the traction motors supplied by the Dutch firm Holec.

Initially 37 units were ordered, with the option for fourteen more. Eighteen would be needed for the Cross-City Line, while the remainder would replace older units (such as the Class 304 and Class 310); ultimately a total of 43 three-car units were actually built. When the electrification of the Leeds/Bradford – Skipton/Ilkley Airedale/Wharfedale Lines was confirmed in the early 1990s, Regional Railways and West Yorkshire PTE applied to the government for fourteen units to add to those already on order. At the time, government spending on the railways was restricted due to the impending privatisation of British Rail and eventually, when funding was not forthcoming, the order was cancelled. Instead 21 second-hand Class 308 units from Network SouthEast were used until new Class 333 EMUs entered service in 2001.

The units are known for a distinctive whine made during acceleration or deceleration, rising/falling through multiple phases falsely suggestive of a motor connected to a gearbox with a great many ratios, caused by use of a gate turn-off thyristor-based inverter as part of the traction control circuitry that drives the three-phase AC motors, a common setup in the early-to-mid 1990s which is notably also present in the Networker family of EMUs. The "gear-changing" effect is produced by the simplification of the PWM pulse pattern so as not to overload the thyristor, which switches at lower frequencies than later implementations of the variable-frequency drive and hence produces a lower-pitched sound.

== Service history ==
=== British Rail service ===
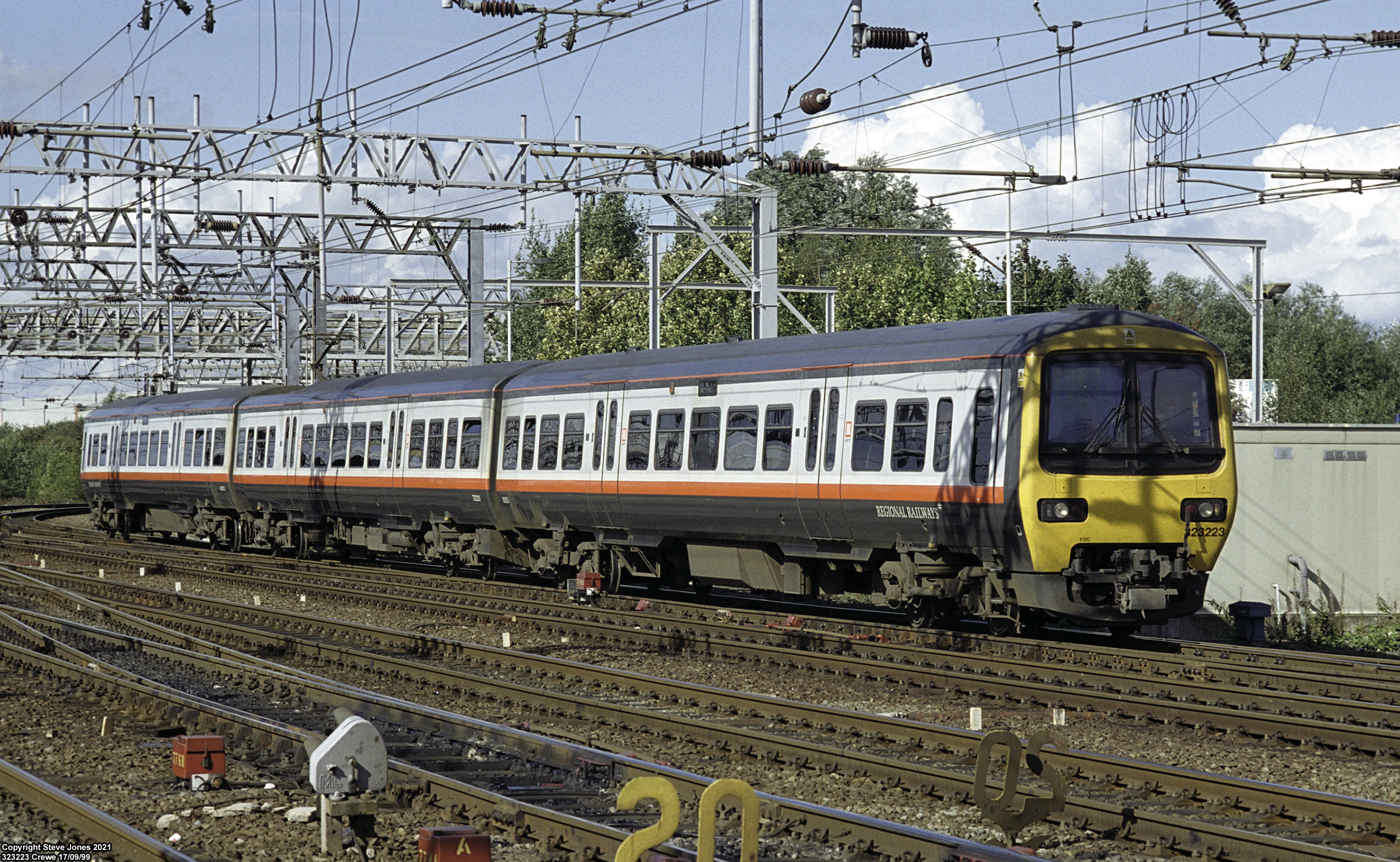
Class 323 on approach to Crewe in 1999, still in BR-era Regional Railways/Greater Manchester Passenger Transport Executive livery

The Class 323s were initially beset with a number of technical problems related to their traction motors, doors, traction converters, gearbox and vibration at high speed which took several years to resolve, preventing them from entering service. The first unit finally entered revenue-earning service on 7 February 1994. A mixed fleet of elderly diesels which the 323s had been intended to replace, as well as some elderly Class 304, Class 308 and Class 310 electric units, were drafted in to operate Cross-City Line services until the problems were resolved. Electric services began on 26 November 1992 on the northern section of the Cross-City Line, before the entire route was energised in June the following year. The 323s became reliable enough to operate a full service in 1995.

=== Post-privatisation service ===
As part of the privatisation of British Rail, all 43 were sold to Porterbrook in 1994 and allocated to the Central Trains and North West Regional Railways shadow franchises.

==== West Midlands ====
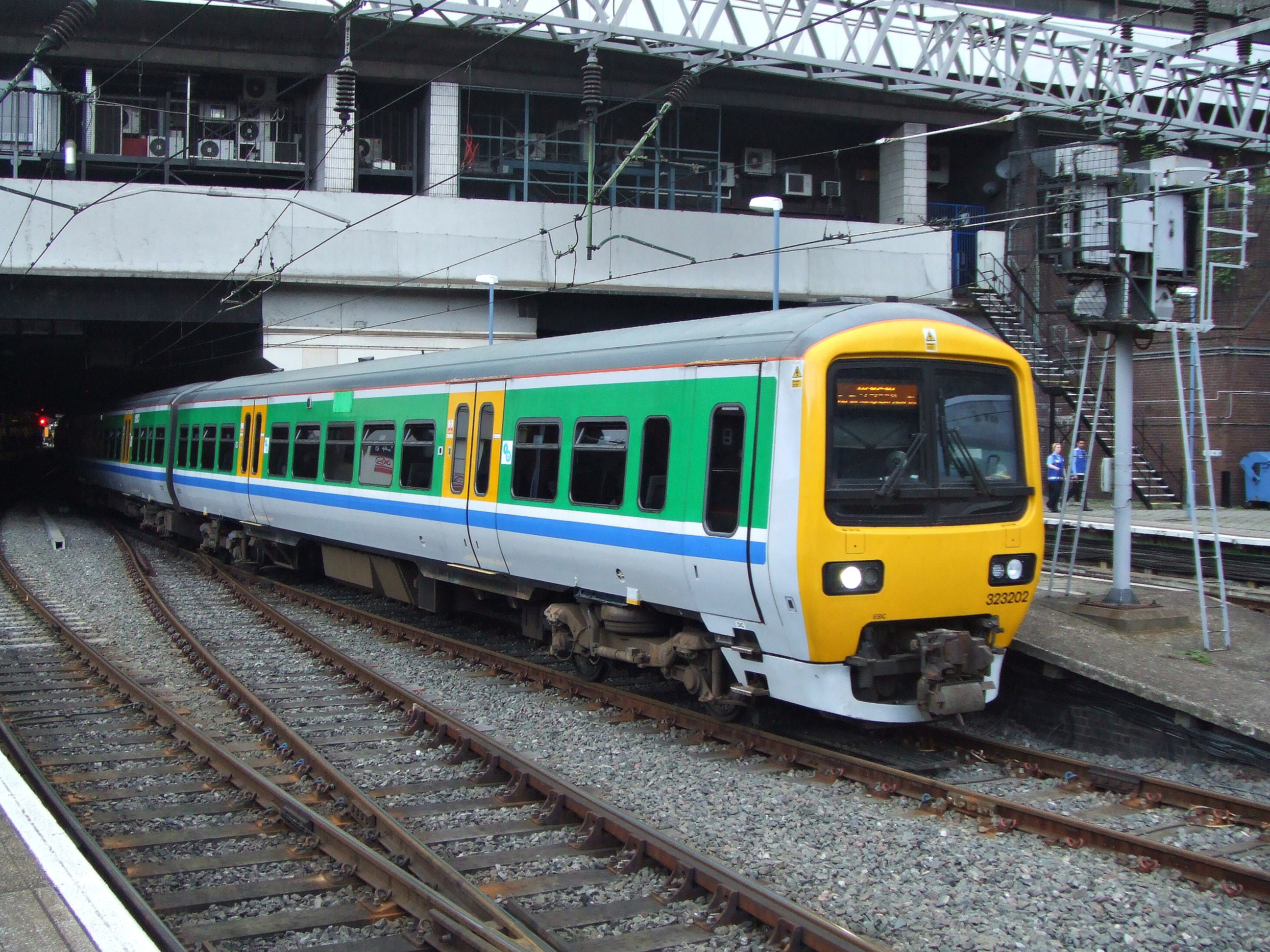
Central Trains Class 323 at Birmingham New Street in Centro livery in 2007

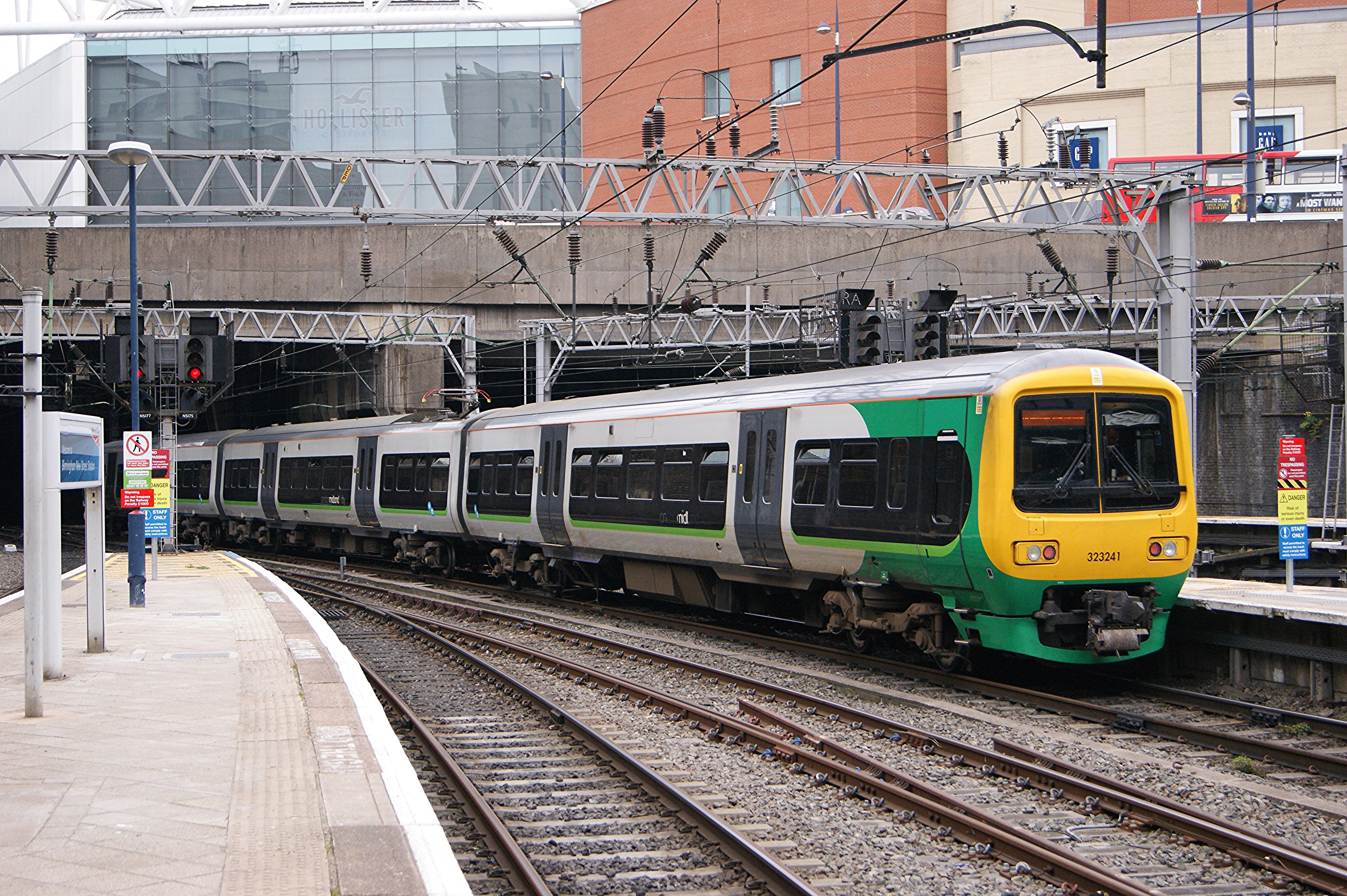
London Midland Class 323 at Birmingham New Street in 2014

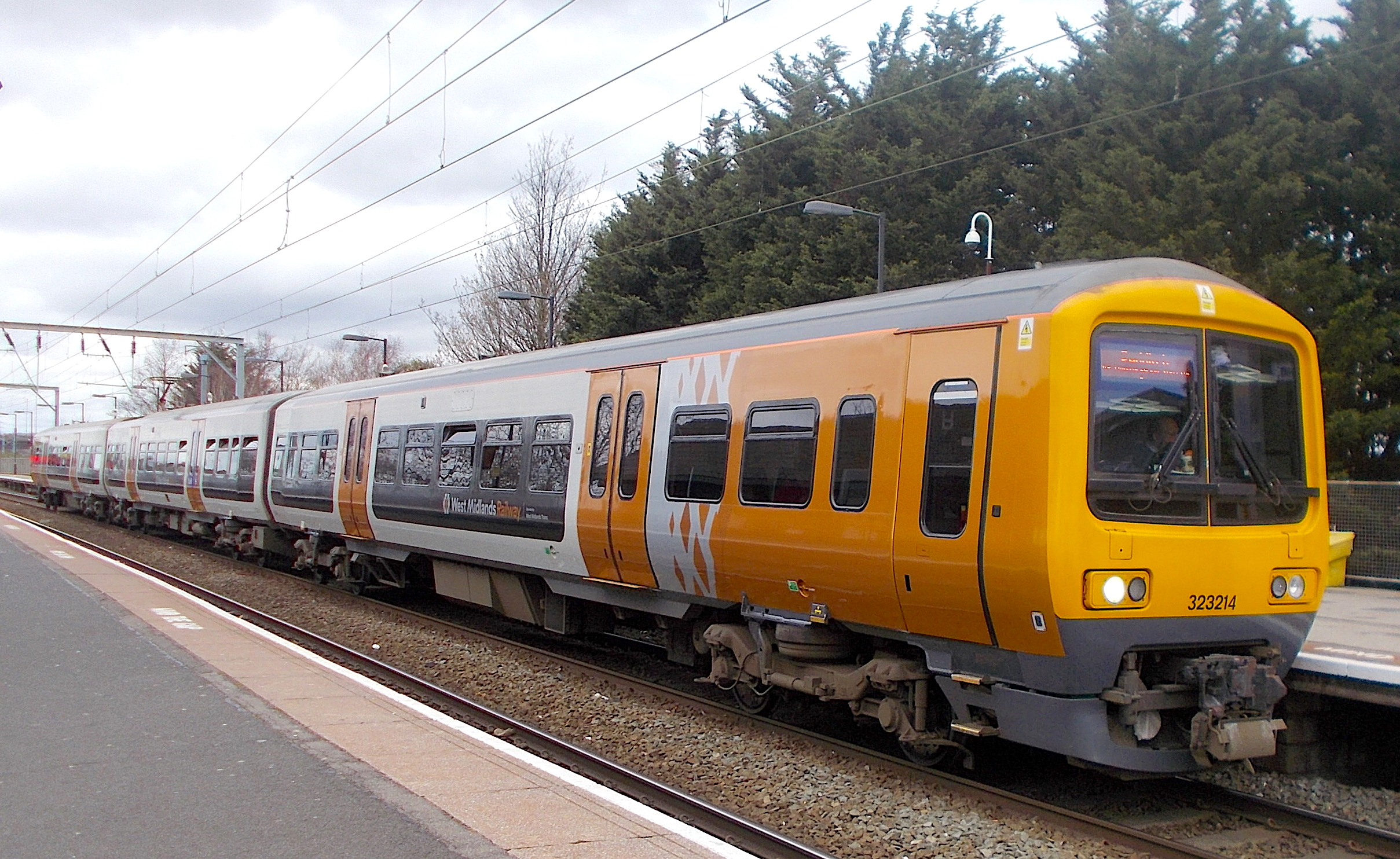
West Midlands Trains Class 323 at Aston railway station in 2019

Central Trains inherited from British Rail a fleet of 26 units in two blocks; 323201–323222 and 323240–323243. In November 2007, these passed to London Midland when it took over the franchise.

In December 2017, West Midlands Trains took over the West Midlands franchise, and the 323s passed to that company.

In mid-to-late 2019, a number of West Midlands Trains' Class 323 units were used for an in-service pilot test of retrofitted Double Variable-Rate Sanders, sponsored by the Rail Safety and Standards Board. The test demonstrated that the new sanding equipment significantly improved braking performance in low-adhesion conditions.

To celebrate 30 years service in the West Midlands unit 323221 was repainted into the Centro livery.

To celebrate 30 years of operation of Soho Depot where the West Midlands fleet is maintained, the West Midlands fleet had Soho LMD 1993 Cross City Line Diamond logos applied to them.

A farewell tour was held on 29 September 2024 to mark the withdrawal from service of the West Midlands fleet. The West Midlands fleet was withdrawn from service the same day.

The West Midlands Class 323 fleet was replaced by the Class 730.

==== North West ====
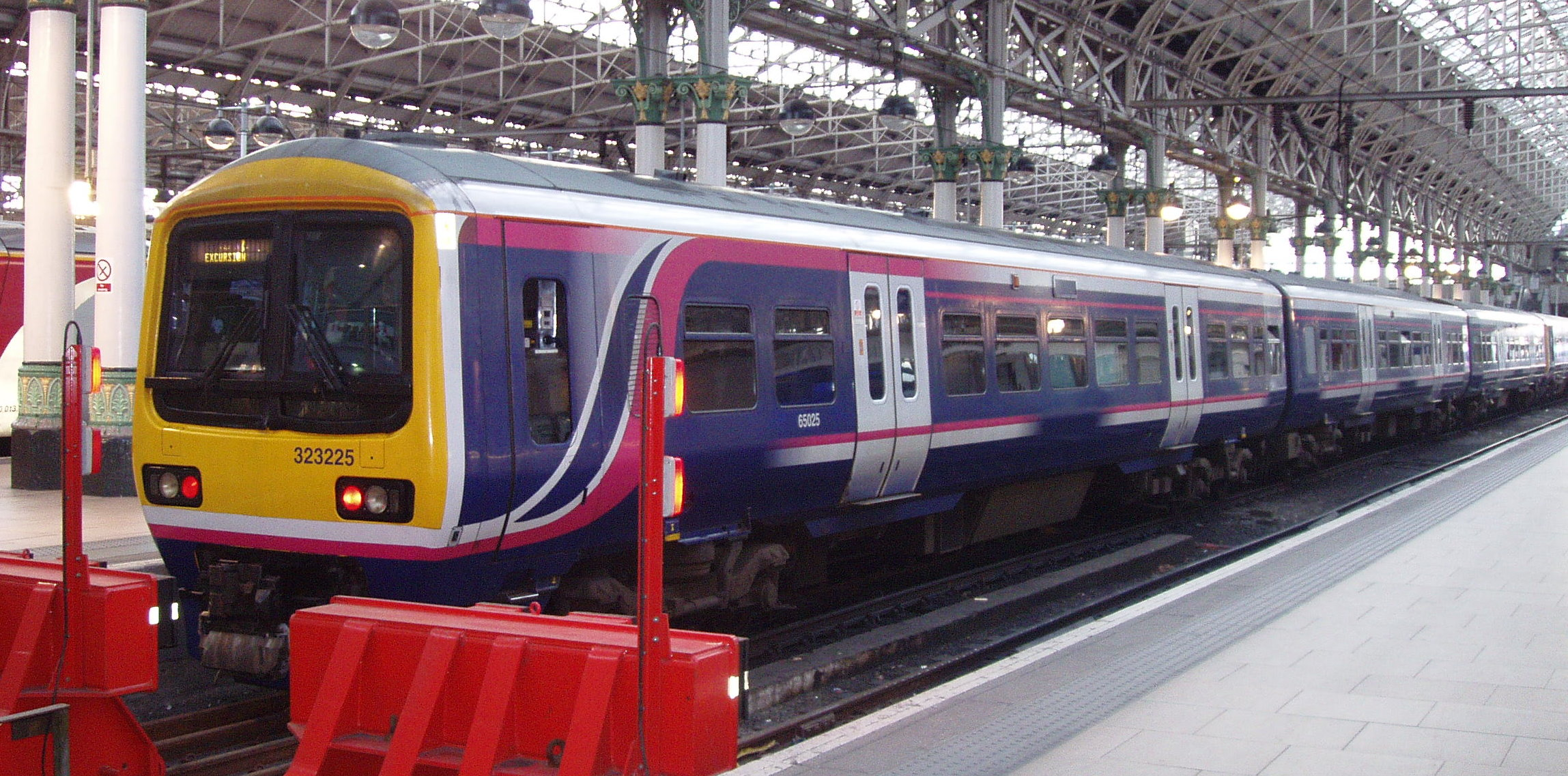
Northern Rail Class 323 in de-branded First North Western livery at Manchester Piccadilly in 2007

The units were used to replace older stock of Classes Class 304 and Class 305, although some of the latter were retained in reserve until 2000. They are used on the Manchester electrified network, primarily to the south of the city.

At the time of the privatisation of British Rail, the Regional Railways North West franchise was re-branded North Western Trains, and it inherited 17 of these units (323223–323239). North Western Trains became First North Western in 1998 and its operations were taken over by Northern Rail in 2004. All passed to Arriva Rail North with the franchise in April 2016, and then to current operator Northern Trains on 1 March 2020.

The 323s were planned to leave Arriva Rail North in December 2018 when replaced by the Class 331 fleet, but this did not occur. Instead, the Class 323 fleet was retained – and was enlarged with a cascade of 17 units from West Midlands Trains taking place between October 2023 and July 2024

The 17 West Midlands Railway units to be transferred to Northern once the Class 730s enter service, started to receive "digital modifications" in 2023. The first of these trains (323208) was transferred to Northern in October 2023.

The fleet is currently maintained at Allerton TMD and Ardwick TMD with units terminating in Manchester stabled at Stockport Edgeley carriage sidings where they receive overnight cleaning. The 323s were formerly maintained at Longsight Electric TMD.

In the future the fleet will be stabled and maintained at Manchester International Depot.

In late 2025 unit number 323239 was re-livered into a promotional yellow "Bee Network" livery, this was done to mark one year until rail was to be integrated into the Bee Network and to advertise tap and go introduced on the trains.

== Refurbishment ==
As part of a refurbishment in the early 2000s, the Class 323 fleet received guard's door control panels in the trailer vehicles.

Class 323s operated by both Northern Trains and West Midlands Railway received a full refurbishment between 2018 and 2021, with the first refurbished units delivered to West Midlands Railway in February 2019, and the first Arriva Rail North unit (323234) returning on 22 October 2019. The rest of fleet was refurbished to the same standard over the following years.

These works involved the replacement of seat covers, interior and exterior repainting (into the new livery of their respective operators), the installation of a new passenger information system and wheelchair call-for-aid buttons, and the addition of an accessible toilet in place of the original small toilet cubicles, among other modifications. The last Class 323 unit to be refurbished (323224) returned to Northern Trains on 23 January 2021, while the last West Midlands Railway 323 unit was returned in 2020.

Many of these changes were a requirement of the PRM (Persons with Restricted Mobility) TSI, with which all UK trains have to be compliant.

== Accidents and incidents ==
On 18 December 2008, unit 323231 collided with a Nissan 4x4 which had rolled down the embankment from a delivery company car park at North Rode, Congleton. The unit spent 16 months out of service to undergo repair as a result.

On 17 December 2019, unit 323234 derailed in the Ardwick train depot. The train rolled approximately 4 feet (1.2 m) away from the railhead and where it had ended up. No one was hurt in the accident as it occurred at a low speed.

== Fleet details ==
Class	Operator	Qty.	Year built	Cars per unit	Unit nos.
323	Northern Trains	34	1992–1995	3	323202–323203, 323205–323210, 323212–323213, 323217–323220, 323223–323239, 323241–323243
323	Stored	9	1992–1995	3	323201, 323204, 323211, 323214–323216, 323221–323222, 323240

=== Named units ===
The following units received names, all of which have since been de-named:

- 323201: Duddeston
- 323202: Butlers Lane
- 323203: Aston
- 323204: Selly Oak
- 323205: Blake Street
- 323206: Barnt Green
- 323207: Bournville
- 323208: Five Ways
- 323209: Birmingham New Street
- 323210: Shenstone
- 323211: Four Oaks
- 323212: Bromsgrove
- 323213: Sutton Coldfield
- 323214: Wylde Green
- 323215: Gravelly Hill
- 323216: University
- 323217: Chester Road
- 323218: Lichfield City
- 323219: Kings Norton
- 323220: Lichfield Trent Valley
- 323221: Northfield
- 323222: Redditch
- 323240: Erdington
- 323241: Dave Pomroy 323 Fleet Engineer 40 Years Service.
- 323242: Alvechurch
- 323243: Longbridge

=== Awards ===
At the 2023 Gold Spanner awards, the West Midlands Trains Class 323 fleet won a Silver spanner award for the "most improved Ex-BR EMU fleet over the past year".

At the 2024 Gold Spanner awards, the Northern Trains Class 323 fleet won a Silver Spanner award.
