= British Rail Class 305 =

British class of electric multiple units

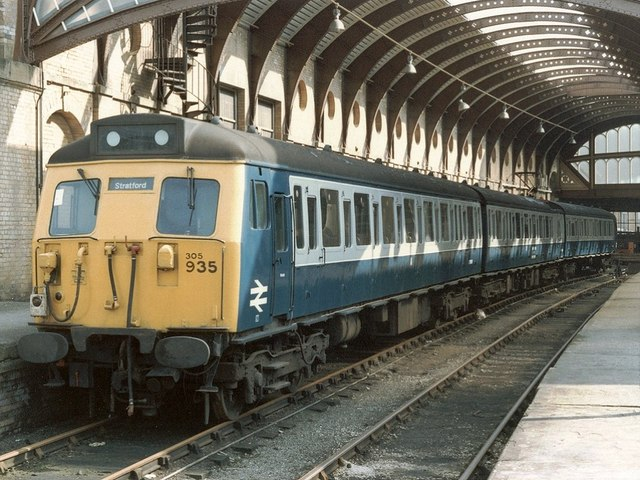
- A Class 305 unit at York
- In service: 1959–2002
- Manufacturer: British Railways
- Order nos.: 30566 (BDTSOL, 305/2, as built), 30567 (MBSO, 305/2), 30568 (TSOL, 305/2), 30569 (DTSO, 305/2), 30570 (BDTSO, 305/1), 30571 (MBSO, 305/1,); 30572 (DTSO, 305/1)
- Built at: Holgate Road, York (305/1); Doncaster Works (305/2)
- Family name: BR First Generation EMU
- Replaced: Steam locomotives and carriages
- Constructed: 1959–60
- Refurbished: 1983–84 (305/2 facelift)
- Number built: 71
- Number preserved: 0
- Number scrapped: 71
- Successor: Classes 310, 315, 321, 322, 323
- Formation: Class 305/1: BDTSO+MBS+DTSO. Class 305/2 as built: BDTSOL+MBSO+TCsoL+DTS; Class 305/2 facelifted: BDTCOL+MBS+TSOL+DTSO. Class 305/3: BDTSO+MBS+TCsoL+DTSO.
- Diagram: As built Class 305/1: 413 MBSO; 436 BDTSO, DTSO; Class 305/2: 405 MBSO; 437 DTS; 438 BDTSOL; 455 TCsoL; TOPS codes Class 305/1: E204.0A MBSO; EE209.1B DTSO; EF205.0A; Class 305/2: As built: ED205.1B MBS; EE210.0A DTS; EF206.0A BDTSOL; EH302.1B TCsoL; Refurbished: ED216.0A MBSO; EE220.0A DTS; EF304.0A BDTSOL; EH223.0A TSOL
- Design code: AM5
- Fleet numbers: Class 305/1 (401-452): 75462-75513 BDTSO; 61429-61480 MBS; 75514-75565 DTSO.; Class 305/2 (501-519): 75424-75442 BDTSOL later BDTCOL; 61410-61428 MBS later MBSO; 70356-70374 TCsoL later TSOL; 75443-75461 DTS later DTSO
- Capacity: 272 seats (305/1); 344 second + 19 first (305/2)
- Operators: British Rail; First North Western; ScotRail (National Express)
- Depots: Ilford; East Ham; Glasgow Shields Road; Longsight Electric

Specifications
- Car body construction: Welded steel and sprayed asbestos
- Train length: 199 ft 6 in (60.81 m) (305/1); 265 ft 8 1/2 in (80.99 m) (305/2)
- Car length: 63 ft 6 1/2 in (19.37 m)
- Width: 9 ft (2.74 m)
- Height: 12 ft 7 in (3.835 m)
- Doors: Slam door
- Articulated sections: 3 or 4
- Wheelbase: 46 ft 6 in (14.173 m) (bogie centres); 8 ft 6 in (2.59 m) (bogies)
- Maximum speed: 75 mph (121 km/h)
- Weight: 119 t (117 long tons; 131 short tons) (305/1); 154 t (152 long tons; 170 short tons) (305/2)
- Traction motors: 4 × GEC WT380 of 153 kW (205 hp)
- Auxiliaries: 240V from the tertiary winding of the main transformer for heating and for a Westinghouse charger feeding 110V DC for lighting and battery charging
- Power supply: Mercury-arc rectifiers (later replaced with silicon diode)
- HVAC: Electric
- Electric systems: 25 kV 50 Hz AC Overhead (with 6.25 kV until 1983)
- Current collection: Pantograph
- Bogies: Gresley ED5 (MBS), Gresley ET8 (DTS), Gresley ET5 (BDTS, BTDC, TS; compound bolster
- Braking system: Westinghouse EP air
- Safety system: AWS
- Coupling system: Drophead
- Track gauge: 1,435 mm (4 ft 8 1/2 in) standard gauge

British Rail Class 305 was a group of 71 alternating current (AC) electric multiple units that operated in England between 1959 and 2002. Initially known as AM5, it became Class 305 when TOPS was introduced in 1973.

== Subclasses ==
Class 305 had four subclasses:

- 305/1 three-car units, standard class accommodation only; 52 units built in 1960
- 305/2 four-car units, first and standard class accommodation; 19 units built in 1959
- 305/3 four-car units, first and standard class accommodation; eight units converted from 305/1 in 1988 by adding a TC from Class 302 units
- 305/9 three-car unit, non-passenger departmental conversion; one unit converted in 1984.

== Operations ==
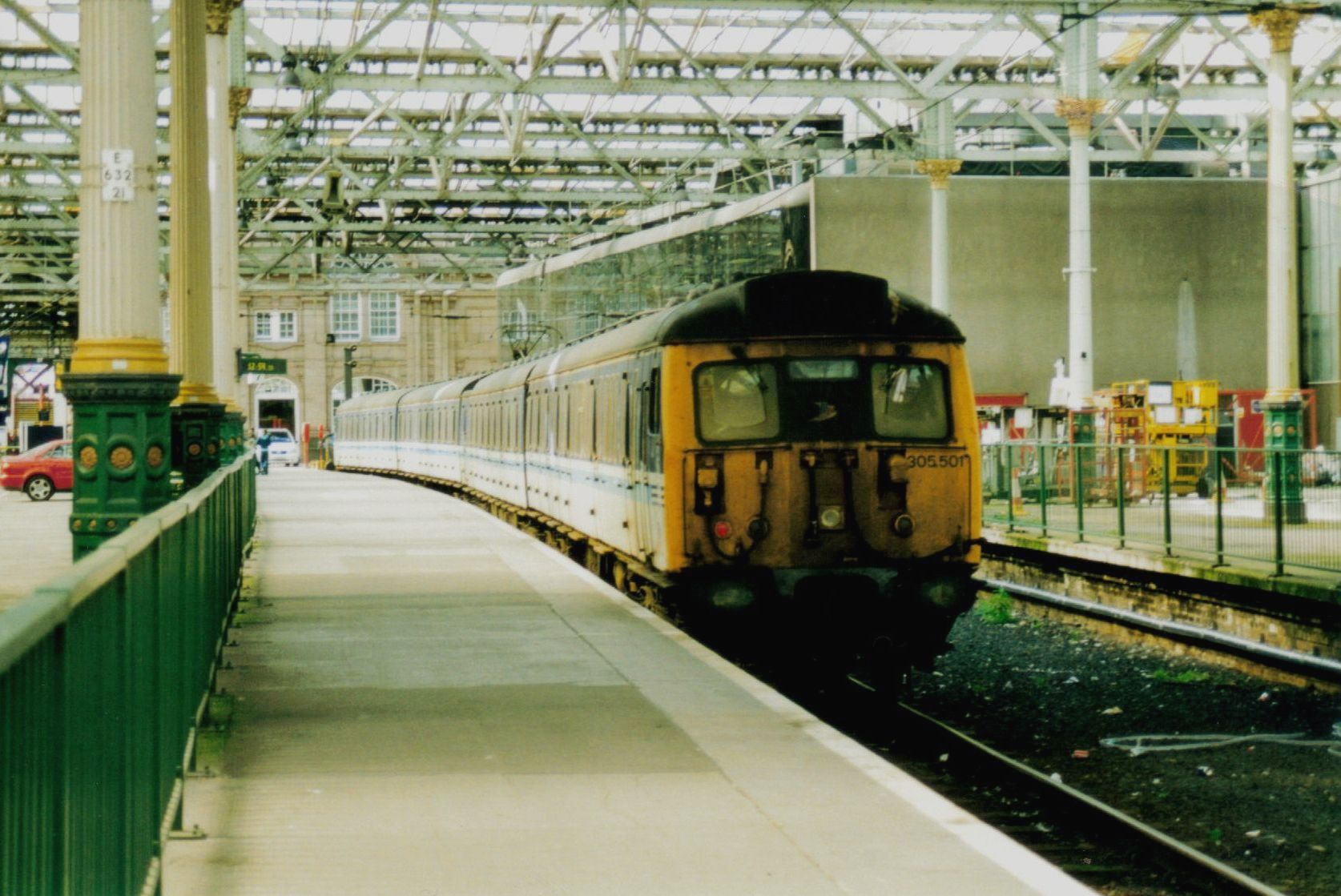
A Class 305 at Edinburgh Waverley in 2001

Class 305/1 units were generally deployed on inner suburban services on the Lea Valley lines out of London Liverpool Street to Chingford, Enfield Town and Hertford East. They mainly worked the Chingford and Enfield branches, where their average scheduled speed was 22 mph (35 km/h). However, they were also used on the Great Eastern suburban lines, occasionally worked out of their normal operating area when coupled to a 305/2 unit or any of the compatible EMUs in use at the time. These units were distinguished by their lower backed seating. 305/1 units were replaced from 1980 onwards by Class 315 units. They were not generally used elsewhere, but a number of units operated around the Manchester area towards the end of their working lives.. All units of the subclass were scrapped.

Class 305/2 units were generally deployed on outer suburban services on the Lea Valley Line out of Liverpool Street to Bishops Stortford, the extent of electrification until 1987, where their average scheduled speed was 34 mph (55 km/h). Like the 305/1 units, they could occasionally be seen on other services out of Liverpool Street and were sometimes coupled to other compatible EMUs for multiple working.

One unit was converted in 1984 for use as a mobile classroom in connection with the East Coast Main Line electrification project, becoming unit 305935, painted in InterCity livery. One of the driving vehicles contained blue asbestos and was subsequently replaced with a driving vehicle from a withdrawn Class 302 set, forming a hybrid set but retaining the same unit number. The unit was later used in East Anglia as part of the Great Eastern electrification and was deployed at Ipswich, Harwich Town and Cambridge.

The 305/2s were refurbished in the mid-late 1980s. As with the 308s, this involved moving first class to a driving trailer, new interior panels, new seats and fluorescent lights.

The 305/2s were initially replaced on the Lea Valley Line by Class 310 units during the late 1980s/early 1990s. Most of the 305/2s were overhauled at Doncaster Works, painted in Regional Railways livery and shortened to three-car sets, before moving to the Manchester area; here, they took on services previously diagrammed by Class 304 units.

A handful were further repainted into Greater Manchester PTE livery, some regaining their TSO trailer and receiving additional luggage racks dedicated to the new services to Manchester Airport. Once the new Class 323 units were introduced, the 305s were gradually withdrawn; a few were retained on Glossop line services until track realignment was performed in 1997, allowing the longer-bodied Class 323s to negotiate the sharp curves at Dinting. The surviving units also occasionally turned up on other local services around Manchester; the last 305 to work in the North West was believed to be no. 506 on 22 May 2000, operating the 20:57 from Stoke-on-Trent to Manchester Piccadilly.

Five 305/5s (nos. 501-502, 508, 517 and 519) moved to Glasgow Shields depot retaining their four-car configuration; they finished their working lives running the route from Edinburgh Waverley to North Berwick. The last unit in service, no. 517, ran its final service on 25 January 2002, operating the 17:15 North Berwick to Edinburgh Waverley; it was sent for scrap on 31 January 2002, along with nos. 501 and 519.

== Accidents and incidents ==
- On 14 February 1990, an empty stock train formed of a Class 305 and a Class 308 unit was derailed at East Ham depot.

== Preservation attempts ==
The AC EMU Group aimed to save a Class 305 driving trailer but, by the time funding was found, they had all been scrapped. A Class 308 driving trailer was saved instead.
