= British Rail Class 312 =

Electric multiple unit train (1975–2004)

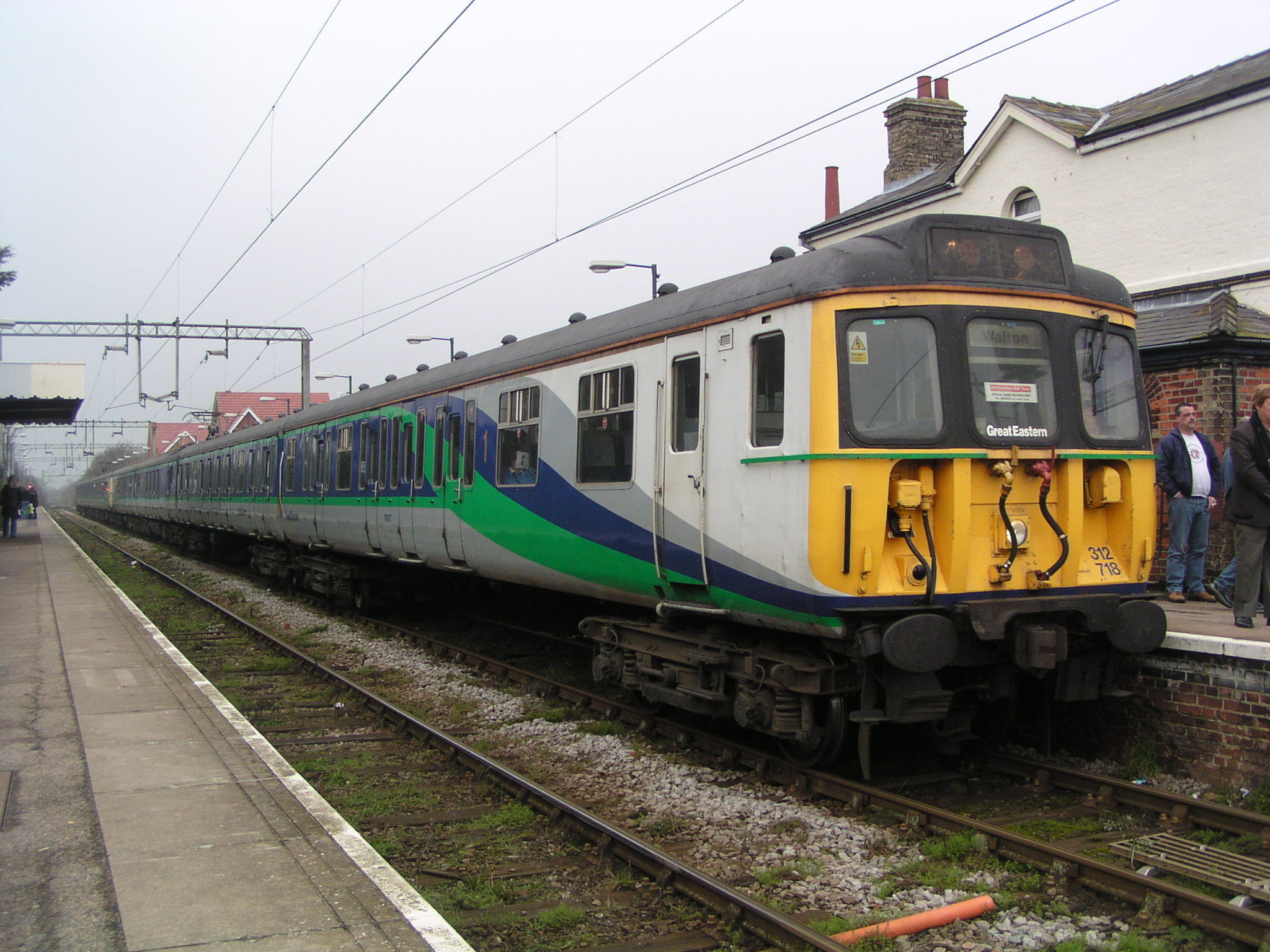
- First Great Eastern Class 312 at Kirby Cross in 2004

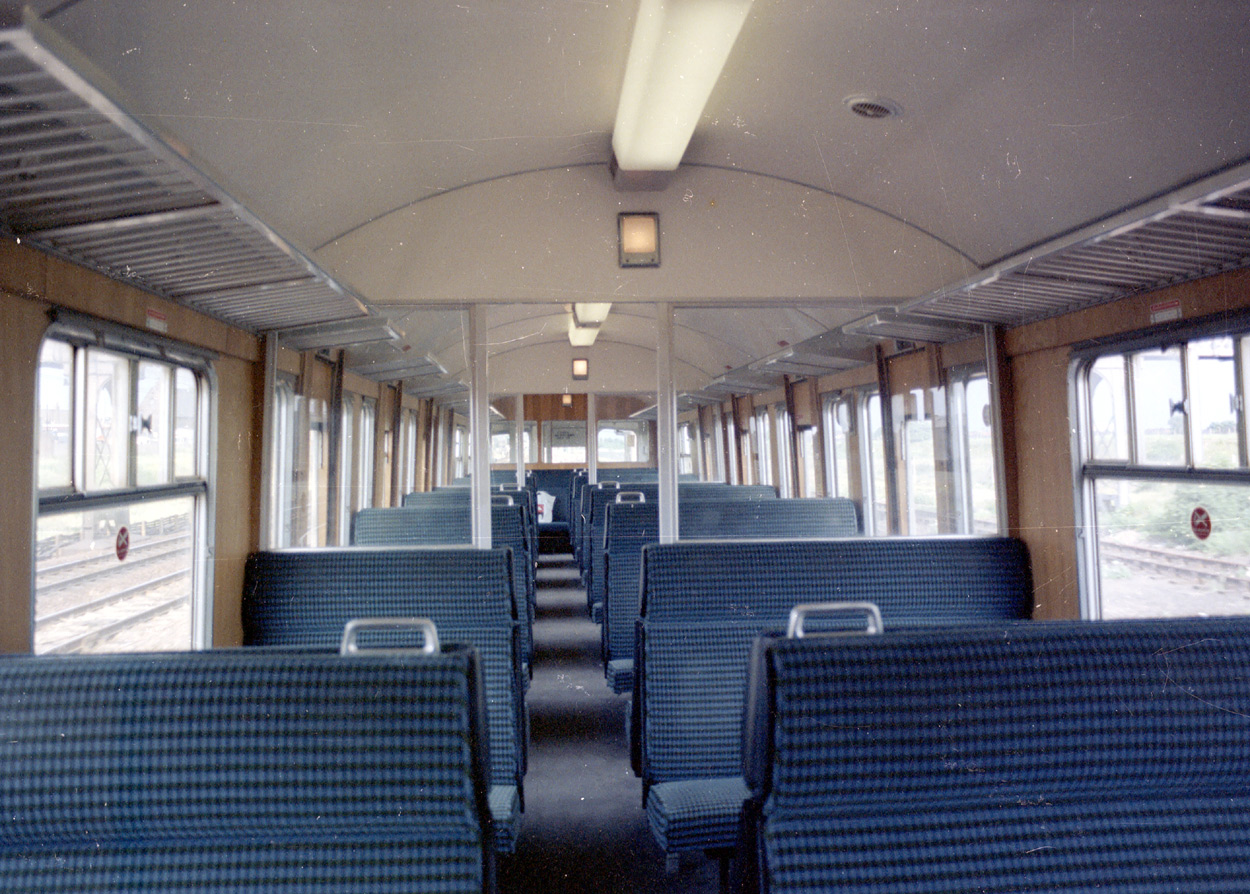
- Inside a Class 312 unit before refurbishment
- In service: 1975–2004
- Manufacturer: British Rail Engineering Limited
- Order nos.: 30863 (312/0 BDTSOL vehicles); 30864 (312/0 MBSOs); 30865 (312/0 & /1 TSOs); 30866 (312/0 DTCOLs); 30867 (312/1 BDTSOLs); 30868 (312/1 MBSOs); 30870 (312/1 DTCOLs); 30891 (312/2 BDTSOLs); 30892 (312/2 MBSOs); 30893 (312/2 TSOs); 30894 (312/2 DTCOLs)
- Built at: Holgate Road, York
- Family name: BR First Generation (Mark 2)
- Replaced: Class 125
- Constructed: 1975–1978
- Number built: 49
- Number preserved: 0; (2 vehicles from 1 unit)
- Successor: Class 317; Class 321/4; Class 323; Class 360
- Formation: 4 cars per unit: BDTSOL-MBSO-TSO-DTCOL
- Diagram: ED212 (312/0 MBSOs); ED213 (312/1 MBSOs); ED214 (312/2 MBSOs); EE305 (all DTCOLs); EF213 (all BDTSOLs); EH209 (all TSOs)
- Fleet numbers: As built: 312/0: 312001–312026; 312/1: 312101–312119; 312/2: 312201–312204; As rebuilt: 312/0: 312701–312726; 312/1: 312781–312799; 312/2: 312727–312730
- Capacity: As built: 322 seats; (25 first-class, 297 standard)
- Operators: British Rail; c2c; Central Trains; First Great Eastern
- Depots: Bletchley; Clacton; Hornsey

Specifications
- Car body construction: Steel
- Train length: 256 ft 8 1/2 in (78.245 m)
- Car length: Drv. cars: 65 ft 1 5/8 in (19.853 m); Int. cars: 65 ft 4 1/4 in (19.920 m)
- Width: 9 ft 3 in (2.82 m)
- Height: 12 ft 4 1/2 in (3.772 m)
- Floor height: 3 ft 9 in (1.14 m)
- Doors: Hinged, manually operated ("slam")
- Wheelbase: Motor bogies: 9 ft 0 in (2.74 m); Trailer bogies: 8 ft 6 in (2.59 m); Over bogie centres: 46 ft 6 in (14.17 m)
- Maximum speed: 312/0 & /1: 90 mph (140 km/h); 312/2: 75 mph (121 km/h)
- Weight: BDTSOL: 35 tonnes (34 long tons; 39 short tons); DTCOL: 33 tonnes (32 long tons; 36 short tons); 312/0 MBSO: 56 tonnes (55 long tons; 62 short tons); 312/1 &/2 MBSO: 55.5 tonnes (54.6 long tons; 61.2 short tons); TSO: 30.5 tonnes (30.0 long tons; 33.6 short tons)
- Traction motors: 4 × English Electric 546A
- Power output: 1,080 hp (810 kW)
- HVAC: Electric heating
- Electric systems: 6.25 kV 50 Hz AC overhead (312/1s only); 25 kV 50 Hz AC overhead (all)
- Current collection: Pantograph
- UIC classification: 2′2′+Bo′Bo′+2′2′+2′2′
- Bogies: Motor cars: BREL BP14; Trailer cars: BREL BT8
- Minimum turning radius: 231 ft 0 in (70.41 m)
- Braking system: Electro-pneumatic
- Safety system: AWS
- Coupling system: Drop-head buckeye
- Multiple working: Within class, and with Class 310
- Seating: Transverse
- Track gauge: 1,435 mm (4 ft 8 1/2 in) standard gauge

The British Rail Class 312 alternating current (AC) electric multiple units (EMUs) were built between 1975 and 1978 for use on outer-suburban passenger services. It was the last class of multiple unit to be constructed with the British Rail Mark 2 bodyshell, as well as the last class of multiple unit to be built with slam doors in Britain. These features contributed to their relatively early withdrawal at 25–28 years old, compared with a typical EMU life expectancy of 30–40 years.

== Description ==
The design of these units was based on the Class 310 used on the suburban services out of London Euston, but were rated for a higher top speed of 90 mph (140 km/h) and they had flat windscreens from the outset. The only significant difference between sub-classes was that the 312/1 units were also equipped to work on the 6.25 kV AC overhead electrification system used on parts of the Great Eastern Main Line and London, Tilbury and Southend line networks.

== British Rail ==
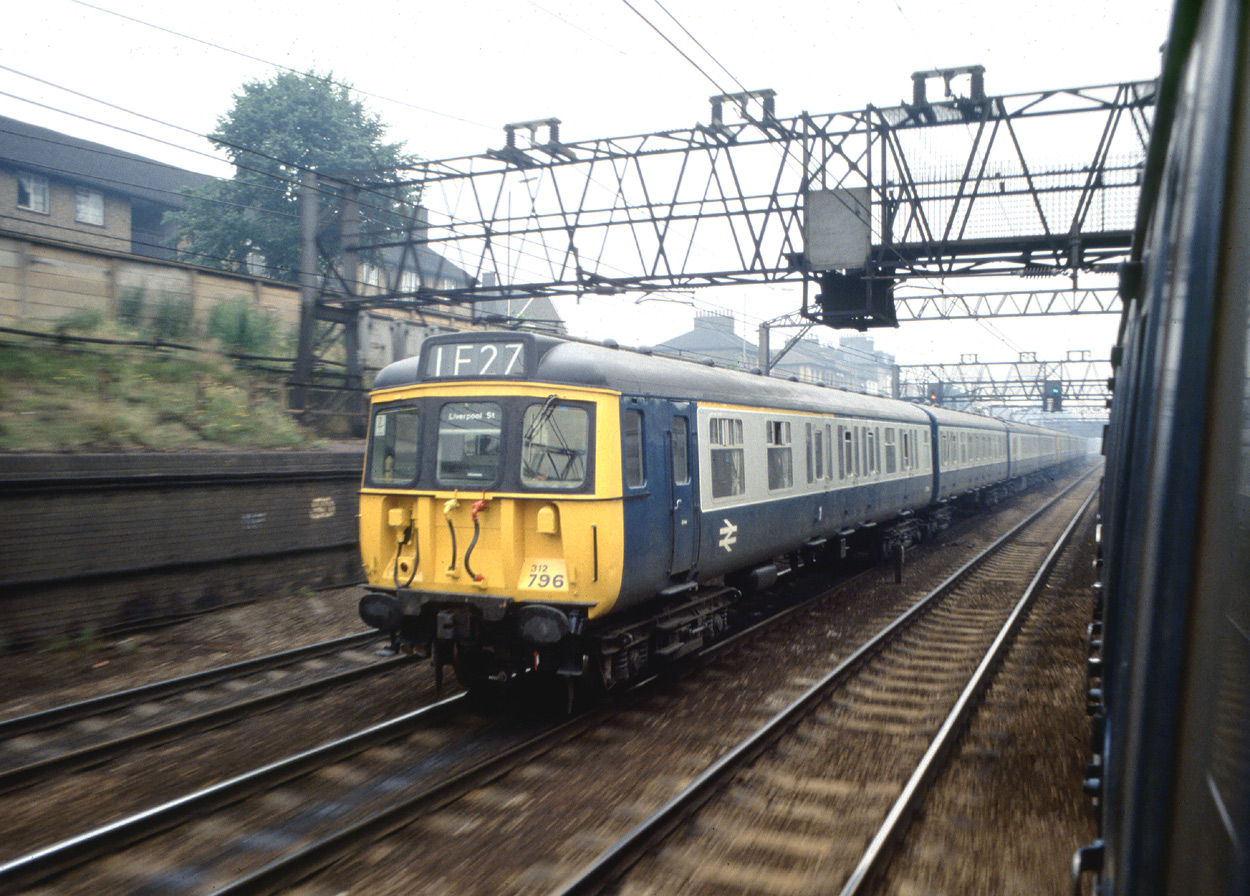
Class 312 in 1970s blue/grey livery

As built, the 312/0 fleet were used on the newly electrified Great Northern outer suburban services from London King's Cross to Royston. The 312/1s were built for Great Eastern line services from London Liverpool Street. The four 312/2 units were mainly used to enhance local services between Birmingham New Street and Birmingham International, but were also used on other services in the West Midlands.

During the late 1980s, the class received an interior refurbishment that saw the wooden panel interiors covered with fascia panels, the removal of window blinds and other alterations. At the same time units lost their blue/grey livery (312/0) or all-over blue livery (312/1 and 312/2 as introduced) in favour of Network SouthEast (NSE) livery (312/0-1), whilst of the four 312/2 units, 312204 carried West Midlands Passenger Transport Executive yellow and blue livery and the others were dressed in the standard blue and grey, before their transfer to NSE.

At the same time, or soon after, units were reallocated. The Class 312/0 units moved to the Great Eastern Main Line following the arrival of a more modern 100 mph (160 km/h) Class 317 fleet. The 312/1 subfleet consequently moved to the London, Tilbury and Southend line, displacing older Class 302 and 305 units. The section of 6.25 kV on the GEML had been converted to the now standard 25 kV, meaning the exclusive dual-voltage capability of this subfleet would continue to be useful, the line still being dual-voltage at the time.

The 312/2 units would also go to the Great Eastern, replaced by modified 310 units released by the delivery of Class 321/4 units in the West Midlands. These moves were complete by the end of the 1980s, and allocations remained broadly stable until privatisation and the period until withdrawal in 2003–04.

== Post-privatisation ==
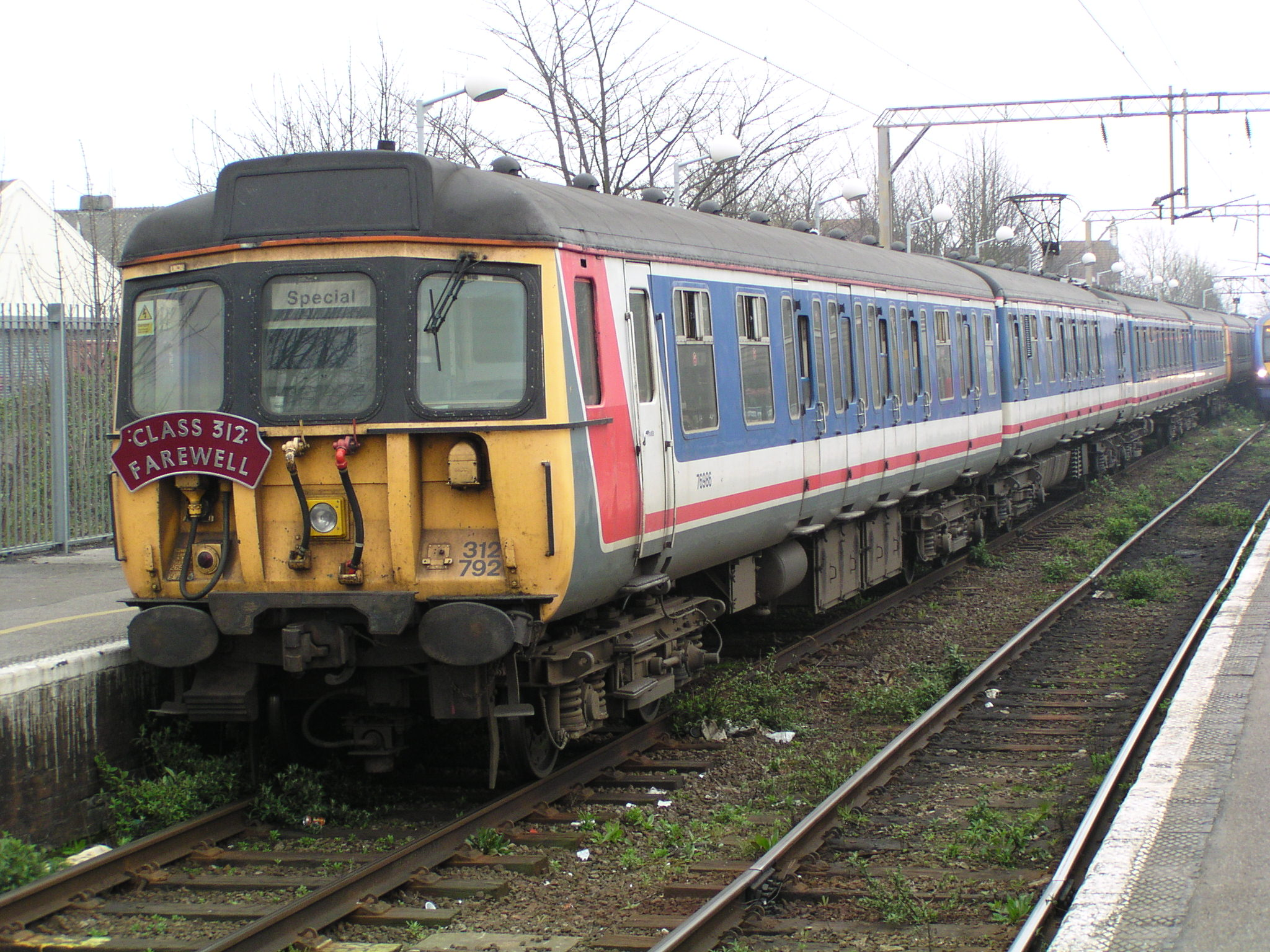
A c2c Class 312 at Shoeburyness in 2003

Upon privatisation, the fleet was divided between three franchises:

=== Central Trains ===
Central Trains inherited four units, 312725–728. These were used primarily on fast Birmingham New Street to Liverpool Lime Street services and were painted in Regional Railways livery. Their stay with Central Trains did not last long and they were transferred to LTS Rail (later rebranded c2c) in 1996.

=== First Great Eastern ===
First Great Eastern inherited 24 units, 312701–724. These were used mainly on Colchester to Walton-on-the-Naze and Manningtree to Harwich services and London Liverpool Street to Ipswich and Clacton peak trains. In later years, two former LTS units, 312728/784, were acquired to replace accident-damaged units such as 312707, written off by an arson attack whilst stabled at Colchester station on 11 March 2003.

In 2003, First Great Eastern acquired new Class 360 units to replace these trains. Units were gradually removed from traffic and, by March 2004, only three sets, 312718/721/723, remained in service. A farewell charter train operated on their previous routes using two of these units. The final sets were used on peak trains and were withdrawn on 25 June 2004 after the return of the five Class 322 units, which had been on hire to ScotRail.

With all sets on the London Liverpool Street to Southend service having been replaced by Class 321 units, the last service to survive east of Shenfield was the early morning 12-car service from Southminster to London, where 321 units could only operate in 8-car configuration.

=== LTS Rail (c2c rail) ===
c2c (operating the London, Tilbury and Southend franchise) inherited 21 units, 312729/730/781–799, which were supplemented later by the four former Central Trains units, 312725–728. These latter units were repainted in Network SouthEast livery, which were some of the last vehicles to be so treated.

The final units were withdrawn from service in 2003, having been replaced by new Class 357/2 Electrostar units. Two units were transferred later to First Great Eastern to supplement their fleet, as detailed earlier.

== Accidents and incidents ==
- On 20 December 1990, unit 312 714 was derailed at Colchester whilst working a Clacton-on-Sea to London Liverpool Street service.

== Preservation ==
Vehicles 78037 and 71205 from unit 312792 have been preserved and were at Electric Railway Museum, Warwickshire.

Following the closure of the ERM, both vehicles moved to the Colne Valley Railway, Essex in March 2018, taking them back to their native operating area.

== Fleet details ==
The table below illustrates the original formation, numbering and areas of use:

Sub-class	Built	Unit numbers		BDTSOL	MBSO	TSO	DTCOL	Area of use
Sub-class	Built	Original	Later	BDTSOL	MBSO	TSO	DTCOL	Area of use
312/0	1976–1978	312001–312026	312701–312726	76949–76974	62484–62509	71168–71193	78000–78025	Great Northern
312/1	1975–1976	312101–312119	312781–312799	76975–76993	62510–62528	71194–71212	78026–78044	Great Eastern
312/2	1976	312201–312204	312727–312730	76994–76997	62657–62660	71277–71280	78045–78048	West Midlands

Operator	No. of units	Unit numbers	Withdrawn	Notes
Central Trains	4	312725–312728	1996	Transferred to c2c
c2c	25	312725–312730, 312781–312799	March 2003	-
First Great Eastern	24	312701–312724	June 2004	312707 destroyed by arson attack in 2003; 312728 and 312784 transferred from c2c in 2003
