= Clacton Servicing Depot =

Train stabling point in Clacton-on-Sea, Essex

Clacton Carriage Servicing Depot
- Interactive map of Clacton Carriage Servicing Depot

Location
- Location: Clacton-on-Sea, Essex
- Coordinates: 51.7954°N 1.1549°E
- OS grid: TM176154

Characteristics
- Owner: Greater Anglia
- Depot code: CC (1973–)
- Type: EMU

Clacton Carriage Servicing Depot is a stabling point located in Clacton-on-Sea, Essex, England. The depot is situated on the western side of the Great Eastern Main Line and is adjacent to Clacton-on-Sea station.

The depot code is CC.

== History ==
Opened by British Rail in 1981, the depot was built with a three-road dead-end shed. Around 1987, the depot had an allocation of Classes 302, 308, 309, 312 and 313 EMUs. The depot lost its allocation of rolling stock in 1994, and was put to various uses before being scheduled for reopening around 2009.

In 2020, as part of Greater Anglia's rolling stock update strategy, a train lifting system was introduced so that trains could be lifted up from the depot floor. The previous system could lift a four-car EMU but has now been upgraded so that they could lift a Class 755 BMU.

== Bibliography ==
- Marsden, Colin J. (1987). BR Depots. Motive power recognition. Vol. 6. Ian Allan Ltd. ISBN 9780711017191. OCLC 18685680.
- Smith, Paul; Stuart, Philip (2010). Railway Depots. Ian Allan Ltd. ISBN 9780711034822. OCLC 528397749.
- Webster, Neil; Greengrass, Robert; Greaves, Simon (1987). British Rail Depot Directory. Metro Enterprises Ltd. ISBN 9780947773076. OCLC 20420397.
