= Manchester International Depot =

Train maintenance depot in Manchester, England

Longsight International TMD
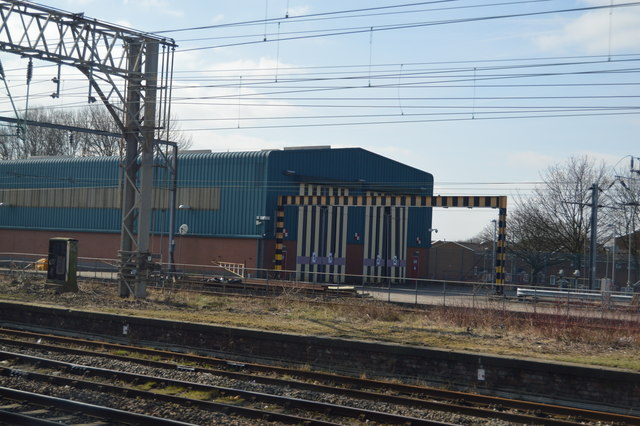
- The depot building in 2015, seen from a passing train
- Interactive map of Longsight International TMD

Location
- Location: Longsight, Greater Manchester, England
- Coordinates: 53.4622°N 2.2028°W
- OS grid: SJ865962

Characteristics
- Owner: London & Continental Railways
- Depot code: LC
- Type: EMU

Manchester International Depot is a train maintenance depot in Manchester, England. It was constructed next to Longsight depot in the early 1990s as part of a plan to operate Regional Eurostar international train services from Manchester to Europe via the Channel Tunnel.

== History ==
By the time that Eurostar services became operational through the Channel Tunnel in 1994, it was decided that regional Eurostar services from Manchester (via the West Coast Main Line) and Glasgow (via the East Coast Main Line) to Paris and Brussels were not economic to run, due to their long journey times compared to air travel: 500 mi (800 km) Manchester-Paris and 760 mi (1,230 km) Glasgow-Paris. However, the depots and trains had all but been completed, by this time, and trial runs operated on both main lines.

The Manchester International Depot, with signs saying "Le Eurostar habite ici" and other Eurostar branding, stood empty and unused for almost ten years. Unlike the majority of the British railway network, it does not belong to Network Rail but to London & Continental Stations & Property (LCSP), a subsidiary of London & Continental Railways.

Regional Eurostar operations never came to pass. In 2005, Siemens began using the depot, rented from LCSP, as a testing base for its new Class 185 DMUs for First TransPennine Express, until its own Ardwick traincare facility dedicated depot had been completed. In 2011, it was reported that London & Continental Railways still owned the Manchester site.

In January 2013, it was announced that an extended Manchester Piccadilly on the north side of the station would have been the new terminus for the cancelled High Speed 2 - as opposed to the south side where the disused Manchester Mayfield station is located. A 7.5 mi (12.1 km) tunnel would have been built under the dense districts of south Manchester to minimise disruption. This tunnel would have surfaced south of the A57 Hyde Road on the current site of the International Depot.

In May 2018, rolling stock manufacturer CAF sub-let the depot from LCSP in conjunction with Alstom for use in testing TransPennine Express rolling stock in conjunction with Freightliner. Mark 5A coaching stock along with Class 68 locomotives on hire from Direct Rail Services were based at the depot, with further testing and commissioning activities for the Class 397 EMUs also being undertaken at the site from early 2019. CAF operations on the site ceased in early 2021.

In January 2023 work was completed to reopen the depot for use as servicing and stabling facility, the depot will be used by Northern Trains to accommodate its Class 323 fleet.

== See also ==
- Longsight Electric TMD
