= Longsight Electric TMD =

Railway traction depot in south Manchester

Longsight Electric TMD Manchester Traincare Centre
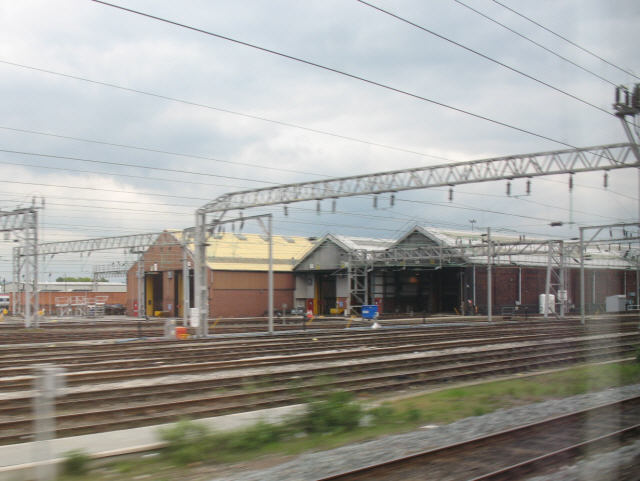
- Longsight TMD in 2008.
- Interactive map of Longsight Electric TMD; Manchester Traincare Centre

Location
- Location: Longsight, Greater Manchester, United Kingdom
- Coordinates: 53.4615°N 2.2001°W
- OS grid: SJ867961

Characteristics
- Owner: Network Rail (leased by Alstom)
- Depot code: LG (1973-present)
- Type: EMU
- Rolling stock: Class 390

History
- Opened: 1842
- BR region: London Midland Region
- Former depot code: 9A (1948-1973)

Longsight Electric TMD is an AC electric railway locomotive traction maintenance depot situated in Longsight, Manchester, England. It is one of the largest train depots in the United Kingdom and can hold 179 carriages at any one time.

== History ==
Erected in 1842 by the Manchester and Birmingham Railway, the depot consisted of workshops, a carriage shed and the first engine shed; this included a 12-stall polygon, or roundhouse, about 130ft in diameter.

In 1987, the depot had an allocation of Classes 303 and 304 EMUs, although electric locomotives of Classes 81, 85, 86 and 87 were also regularly seen stabled here.

A group of Class 86 locomotives were allocated here in the 1990s and early 2000s to operate Virgin Cross Country's electric services.

== Present ==
The depot is used currently by TransPennine Express, Northern Trains, Avanti West Coast and CrossCountry.

Overnight, Northern Trains stores a mixture of DMUs, such as Class 150 and Class 195, and CrossCountry stables several Class 220 or Class 221 Voyager sets. TransPennine Express stores their Class 397 trains overnight at the depot

Avanti West Coast maintains part of its Class 390 Pendolino fleet at the depot, with a maximum of 15 Class 390s stabled per night. The facility operates on a maintenance rota for the fleet. on average between twelve to fourteen sets arrive at the facility each evening to undergo maintenance before being released the following evening, with a further three sets being stabled for periodic maintenance exams or heavy overhaul.

== See also ==
- Longsight Diesel TMD
- Manchester International Depot
