= British Rail Class 310 =

Electric multiple unit trains (1965–2002)

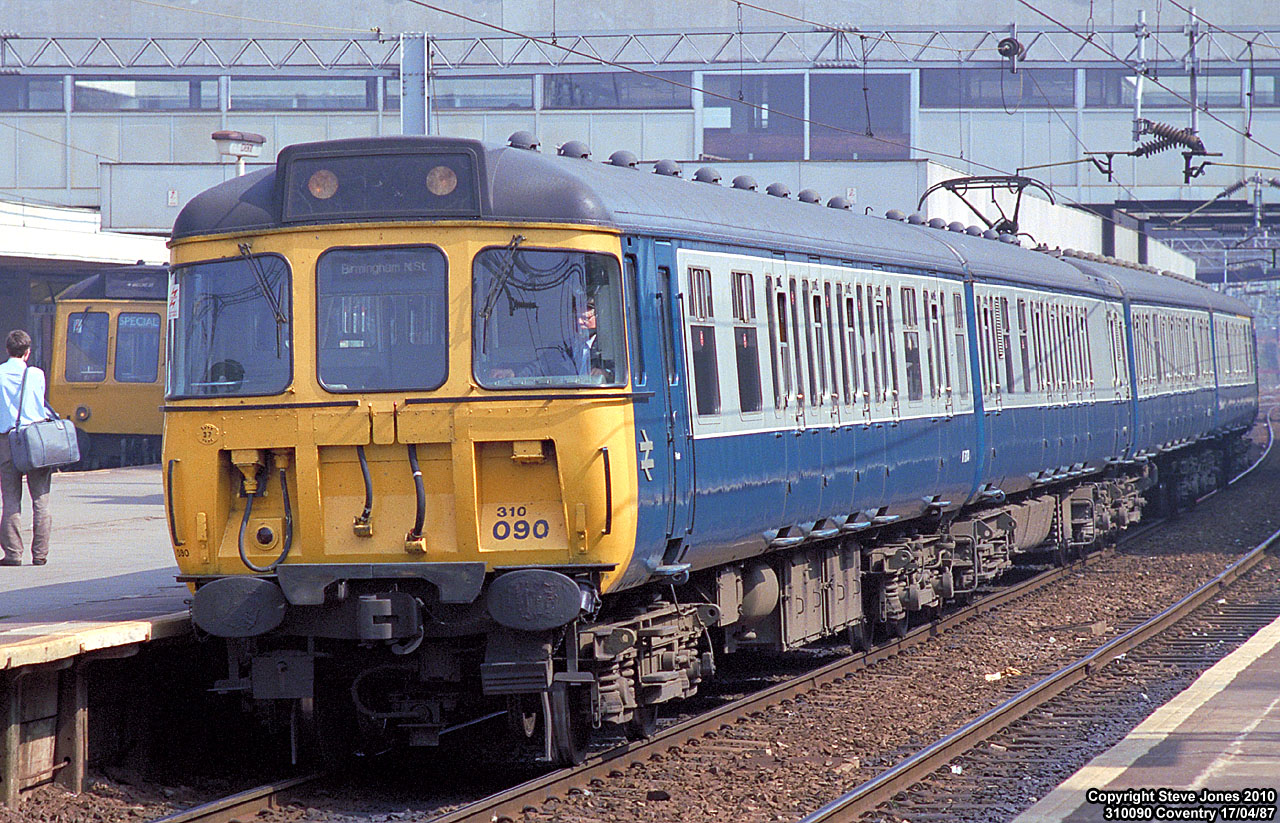
- Class 310 at Coventry in 1987
- In service: 1965–2002
- Manufacturer: British Rail
- Order nos.: 30745 (BDTSOL); 30746 (MBSO); 30747 (TSO); 30748 (DTCOL)
- Built at: Derby Carriage and Wagon Works
- Constructed: 1965–1967
- Refurbished: 1985
- Number built: 50
- Successor: Class 170; Class 323; Class 357
- Formation: 4 cars per unit (310/0); BDTSOL+MBSO+TSO+DTCOL; 3 cars per unit (310/1); BDTSOL+MBSO+DTCOL
- Diagram: ED210 (MBS); ED219 (MBS); EE237 (DTS); EE306 (DTC); EF210 (BDTS); EF211 (BDTS); EF214 (BDTS); EH208 (TS); EH232 (TS)
- Design code: AM10
- Fleet numbers: 310046-310095 (units, 310/0); 310101-310113 (units, 310/1); 76130-76179, 76228, 76998 (BDTSOL); 62071-62120 (MBSO); 70731-70780 (TSO); 76180-76229 (DTCOL)
- Capacity: 293 2nd, 25 1st class; 80S (BDTSOL); 70S (MBSO); 100S (TSO); 25F, 43S (DTCOL)
- Operators: British Rail; c2c; Central Trains
- Depots: Bletchley; Ilford; East Ham
- Line served: West Coast Main Line

Specifications
- Car body construction: Steel
- Train length: 265 ft 8 1/2 in (80.988 m) (4-car)
- Car length: 65 ft 1 3/4 in (19.856 m) (BDTSOL, DTCOL); 65 ft 4 1/2 in (19.926 m) (MBSO, TSO)
- Width: 9 ft 3 in (2.82 m)
- Height: 13 ft 0 1/2 in (3.975 m)
- Maximum speed: 75 mph (121 km/h)
- Weight: 158 t (156 long tons; 174 short tons) (total, as built); 160.6 t (158.1 long tons; 177.0 short tons) (total, 310/0 modified); 128.9 t (126.9 long tons; 142.1 short tons) (total, 310/1 modified); 37.3 t (36.7 long tons; 41.1 short tons) (BDTSOL, modified); 57.2 t (56.3 long tons; 63.1 short tons) (MBSO, modified); 31.7 t (31.2 long tons; 34.9 short tons) (TSO, modified); 34.4 t (33.9 long tons; 37.9 short tons) (DTCOL, modified)
- Traction motors: 4 × EE 546 270 hp (200 kW)
- Power output: 1,080 hp (810 kW)
- HVAC: Electric
- Electric system: 25 kV 50 Hz AC OHLE
- Current collection: Pantograph
- Bogies: B4
- Braking system: Air (auto/EP)
- Safety system: AWS
- Coupling system: Automatic drophead buckeye (outer); Automatic solid shank buckeye (inner)
- Multiple working: Classes 302–312
- Headlight type: Tungsten
- Track gauge: 1,435 mm (4 ft 8 1/2 in) standard gauge

The British Rail Class 310 was a slam-door, alternating current (AC) electric multiple-unit passenger train (EMU) introduced in 1965 as part of the West Coast Main Line electrification project. They were initially classified as Class AM10 units before the introduction of the TOPS classification system. Constructed at BR's Derby Carriage and Wagon Works. They consisted of four carriages - a second class driving trailer, a second class trailer, a second class motor car (with guard's/luggage compartment above which the Stone Faiveley AMBR pantograph was mounted) and a composite (1st and 2nd class) driving trailer. The maximum speed was 75 miles per hour (121 km/h). A glass partition behind the driver's cab enabled passengers in the leading and rear coaches to view the line ahead or behind.

== History ==
They introduced some new features; the first standard multiple units with disc brakes (emergency stop from top speed in 33 seconds over 800 yd (730 m)); the first naturally air-cooled rectifiers (silicon diodes on cups of beryllium oxide), inductors and transformers. Noise was reduced by sprayed asbestos on the floor, body and roof.

Original livery was overall Rail Blue, later amended to the standard BR blue and grey colour scheme.

Initially they were primarily used on local services from London Euston to Bletchley, Northampton and Birmingham New Street, and within the West Midlands. They were also the first EMUs to be based on the British Rail Mark 2 bodyshell, which featured semi-integral construction.

During the mid-1980s they underwent their heavy C1 refurbishment at Wolverton which included new flat windscreens, a corridor connection between the Motor Vehicle (MBS) and trailer (TSO), and a PA system among other modifications.

The Class 310 has a nearly identical body shell to that of the Class 312, there are some minor detail differences in the equipment locations and the MBS has a separate guards van and storage area whereas on the 312 it is combined. When first arriving on the LT&S the Class 310 were modified with an additional plug being inserted in the dummy cylinder of each vehicle and a different size "choke" fitted in the Electro-pneumatic (EP)valve to improve the braking performance to that required on a more intensive service. Also the cast BR double arrows were removed from the cab sides on arrival, or soon after at East Ham Depot. The Class 310 stock also were used for a short while on the newly electrified route to Cambridge prior to replacement with more modern stock.

The motors differed from the class 312 in that the gear ratio is lower which accounts for the maximum speed of 75 mph (121 km/h) compared to 90 mph (140 km/h) on the Class 312. The B4 bogies on the Class 310 are fitted with friction primary dampers whereas on the 312 they are hydraulic.

The main fleet of Class 310/0 units was replaced on the Euston commuter routes with Class 317/1 units which began to enter service on the route in late 1987, however the Class 317 units were then superseded by the new build of Class 321/4 within about 2 years.

Most Class 310 units that survived into the 21st century were withdrawn between 2001 and 2002.

== Sub-classes ==
- 310/0 - four-car units. All 310s were originally 310/0s.
- 310/1 - Four-car units (reduced to three-cars in the mid-1990s) modified for use in the Midlands.

== Accidents and incidents ==
- 18 April 1967, Unit 094 collided with a derailed mineral train between Northampton and Roade. Car 76178 was written off and the other cars were out of service as spares. 310 094 returned to service in April 1975 with two original cars and two from other units.
- 5 August 1967, Unit 081 0735 Stafford to Rugby rear-end collision by runaway Trentham to Lea Hall Colliery coal train hauled by D5090 at Rugeley. The unit was repaired.
- 8 April 1969, Unit 066 involved in head-on collision at Monmore Green, Wolverhampton.
- 4 July 1969, unit Nos 072 & 057, 6 out of 8 carriages derailed at Willesden after colliding with infrastructure.
- 31 December 1969, Unit 071 collided with derailed freight train at Roade.
- 26 July 1971, a unit of the class departed from Macclesfield, Cheshire against signals and was derailed by trap points.
- 20 April 1980, 310 052 collided with track maintenance equipment at Bushey leading to a bogie derailment.
- 11 October 1984 - 310 067 & 310 086 collided with a freightliner train near Wembley Central after passing a signal at danger.
- 4 August 1990 - 310 102 running as empty coaching stock, involved in a rear-end collision with a stationary train at Stafford.

== Privatisation ==
All 310/0 units came under the control of LTS Rail (later rebranded as c2c) which operated them on the London, Tilbury and Southend line. They were replaced by Class 357 units from 1999 to 2002.

The thirteen 310/1 units came under the control of Central Trains. All were withdrawn by 2002 and replaced by a mixture of Class 170 and Class 323 units.

== Departmental usage ==
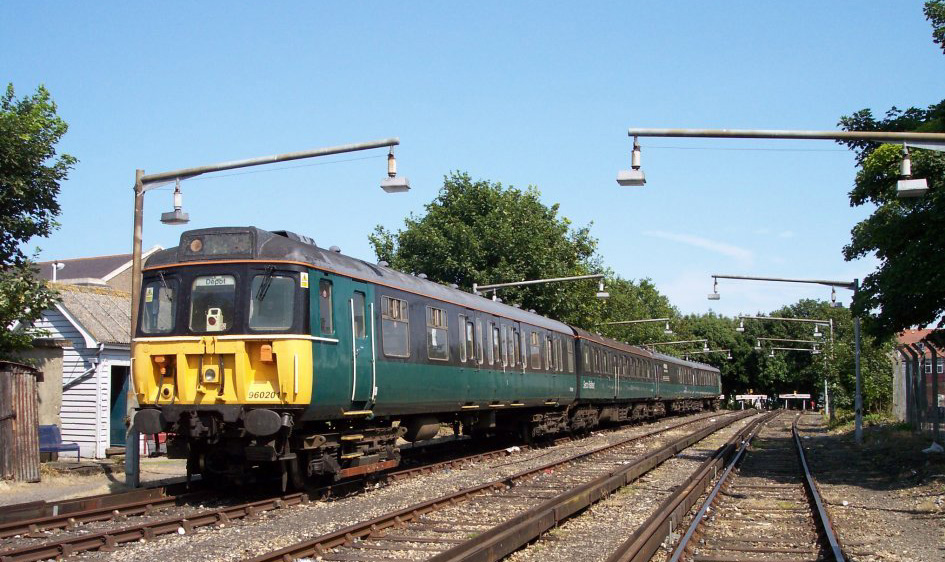
The V Train on the DC system pictured in the New Sidings at Ramsgate - the Class 423 (4-VEP) is the second vehicle.

In 2002, vehicles from two Class 310/1 units, numbers 310109 and 310113, were used to create a single four-car departmental unit, 960201 which could operate on either alternating current (AC) or direct current (DC) lines for test purposes. The set consisted of two driving cars, a Class 310 power car with Hitachi equipment and either a standard Class 310 25 kV power car or a modified 650 V third rail vehicle from a Class 423 (4-VEP) unit. One of these two vehicles was included in the formation depending upon where the unit was operating (on 25 kV overhead lines or third rail). To facilitate third rail running, shoegear was fitted to each driving car. The unit was known as the 'Hitachi Verification Train' or 'V Train' and was used by Hitachi to test and prove its traction equipment in the UK. The subsequent order for the Class 395 Javelin trains which now run on the High Speed 1 line benefitted from this exercise. The V train was scrapped at MoD Pig's Bay in Shoeburyness in 2007.
