= West Anglia Main Line =

Railway line in East Anglia, England

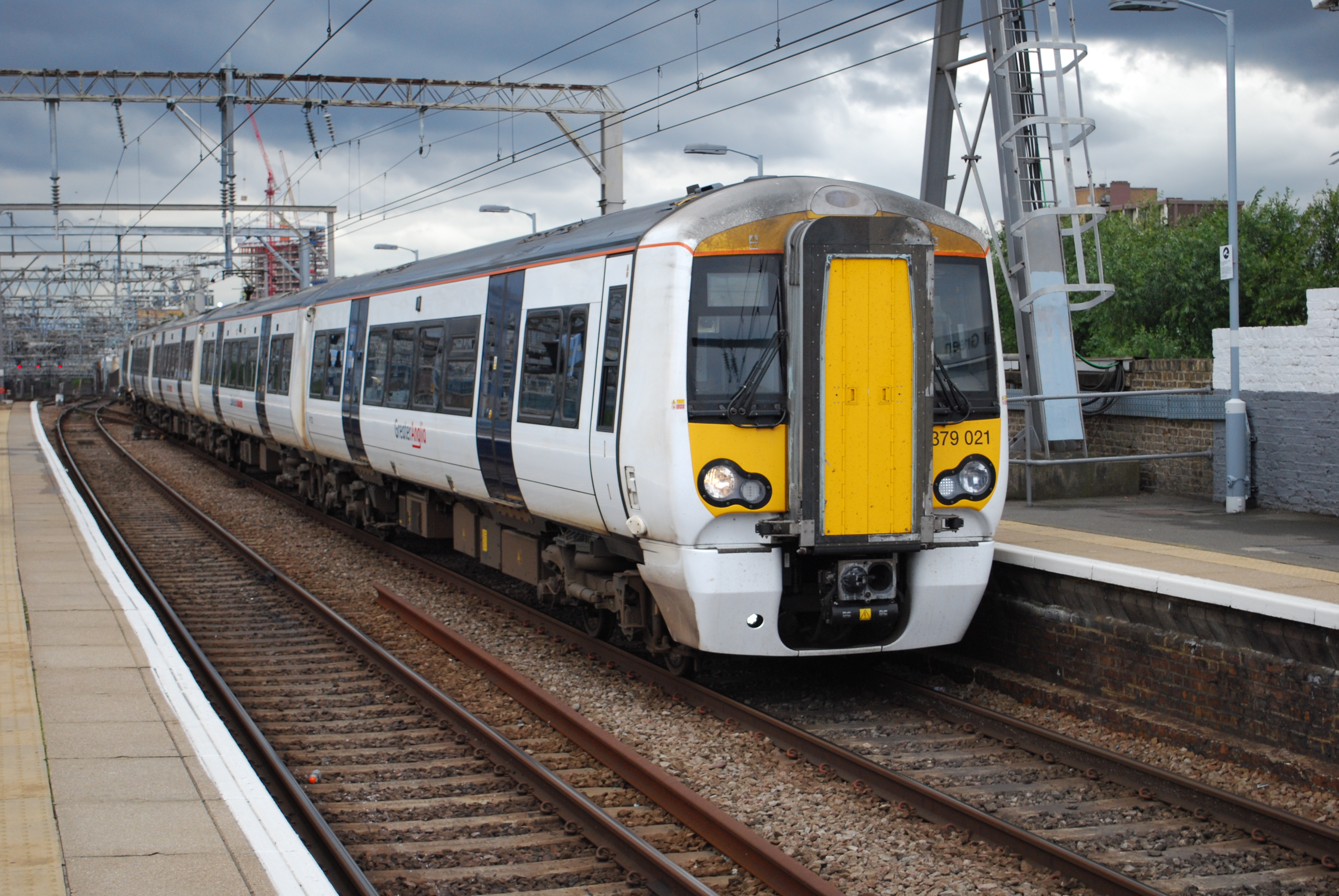
- A Greater Anglia Class 379 at Bethnal Green, August 2012

Overview
- Status: Operational
- Owner: Network Rail
- Locale: Greater London, East of England
- Termini: London Liverpool Street, Cambridge
- Stations: 28

Service
- Type: Commuter rail, Suburban rail
- System: National Rail
- Operators: Greater Anglia, CrossCountry, London Overground
- Rolling stock: Class 170 Turbostar, Class 710 Aventra, Class 720 Aventra, Class 745 FLIRT, Class 755 FLIRT

Technical
- Number of tracks: 2–4
- Track gauge: 1,435 mm (4 ft 8 1/2 in) standard gauge
- Electrification: 25 kV 50 Hz AC OHLE
- Operating speed: 85 mph (137 km/h) maximum
Route map
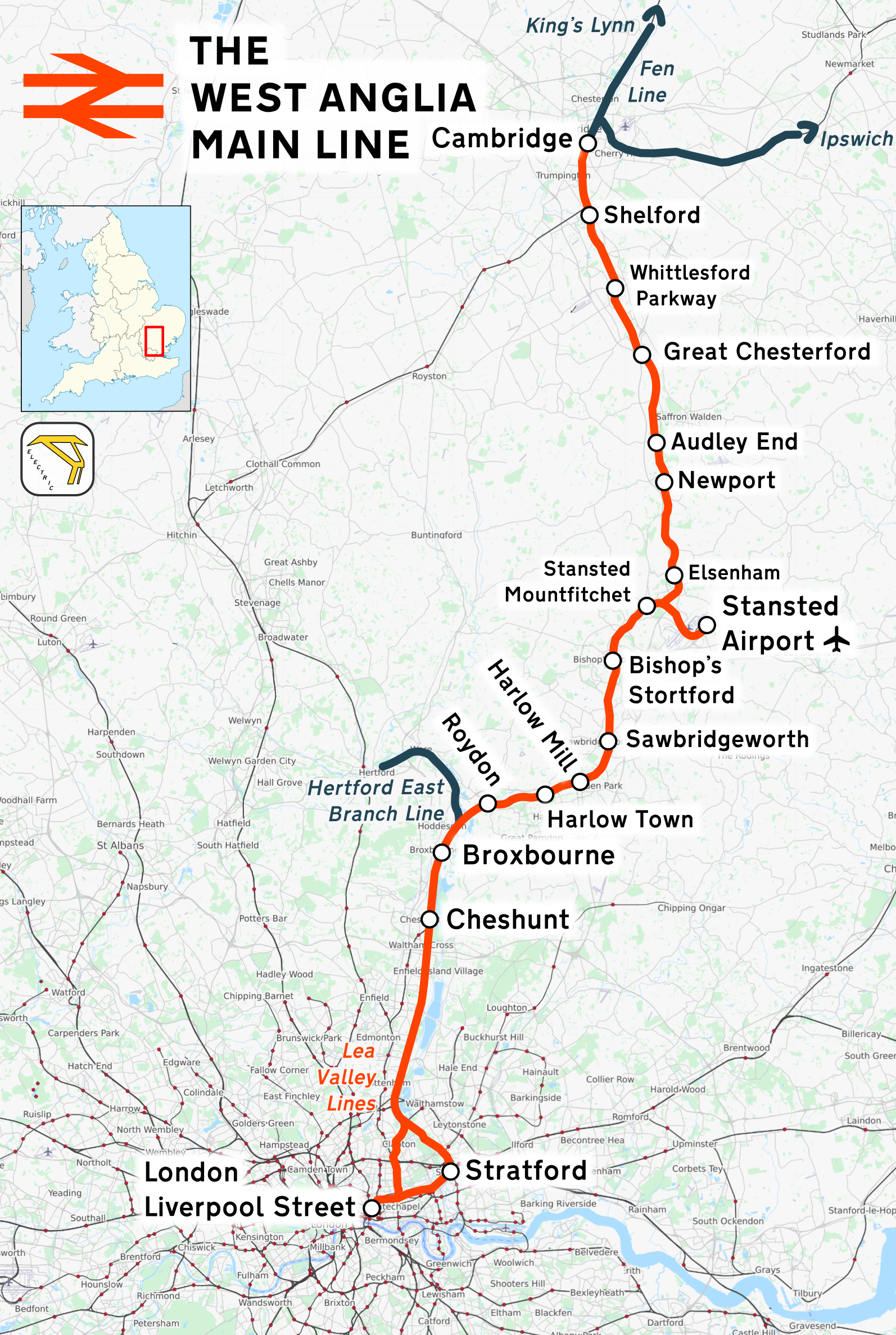
(Click to expand)

The West Anglia Main Line is one of the two main line railways that operate out of Liverpool Street; the other is the Great Eastern Main Line to Ipswich and Norwich. It runs generally north through Cheshunt, Broxbourne, Harlow, Bishop's Stortford and Audley End (near Saffron Walden) to Cambridge, with branches between serving Stratford, Hertford and Stansted Airport. The line runs along the boundary between Hertfordshire and Essex for much of its length.

For many years, the line was the main route from London to Cambridge, Ely and Kings Lynn. Following the 1988 electrification of the Cambridge Line, between Hitchin and Cambridge, the West Anglia Main Line is now primarily a commuter route for stations between Cambridge and London; it also took on a new role as the route for express trains to Stansted Airport.

It was an important goods route for many years as the southern end of a route from coalfields in Yorkshire, and there are still freight trains which run occasionally to Harlow and Rye House Power Station, along with a Network Rail base at Broxbourne.

== History ==
The first section was built for the Northern and Eastern Railway from Stratford to Broxbourne; it opened in 1840. It was extended northwards in stages, reaching Spellbrook, 3 miles (5 km) short of Bishops Stortford, in 1842. In 1843, the line reached Bishops Stortford and, in the following year, the Northern and Eastern Railway was leased by the Eastern Counties Railway. It was this railway company that opened the section from Bishops Stortford to Cambridge, as part of its extension to Ely and Brandon in 1845.

By the 1860s, the railways in East Anglia were in financial trouble and most were leased to the Eastern Counties Railway. Although they wished to amalgamate formally, they could not obtain government agreement for this until 1862, when the Great Eastern Railway (GER) was formed by amalgamation.

The opening of the Great Northern and Great Eastern Joint Railway in 1882 saw the Great Eastern open up a direct link with coal-producing areas in Nottinghamshire and South Yorkshire, joining the line north of Cambridge at Chesterton Junction, generally routed to the large marshalling yards at Temple Mills.

Following Grouping in 1923, the line became part of the London & North Eastern Railway. In 1948, following nationalisation, the line passed to British Railways' Eastern Region.

In 1952, the branch from Elsenham to Thaxted (known as the Gin & Toffee Line) was closed to passengers and goods services were withdrawn a year later. The branch line to Saffron Walden closed to passengers on 7 September 1964 and to freight three months later.

Electrification came in sections; in the early 1960s under British Rail, the line to Chingford included the Stratford – Lea Bridge – Hall Farm Junction section (although this was never completed), the line from Liverpool Street to Broxbourne via Seven Sisters, and the Southbury Loop was electrified. The route via Tottenham Hale was still operated by diesel traction, the Class 125 Lea Valley diesel multiple units (DMUs).

The line from Clapton Junction, on the Chingford branch line through Tottenham Hale to Cheshunt and from Broxbourne to Bishop's Stortford was electrified on 9 March 1969 and from there to Cambridge in 1987. Stratford to Coppermill Junction was electrified in 1989. The overhead line power supply is energised at 25 kV AC.

In 1991, a single-tracked branch line to Stansted Airport was opened and services to London Liverpool Street commenced.

In early 2011, ticket barriers were installed at Bishop's Stortford, Harlow Town, Broxbourne, Cheshunt and Hackney Downs, some of the busiest stations on the line, to reduce the need for ticket inspectors on the Stansted Express service and reduce fare evasion.

In May 2015, services from Liverpool Street to Chingford, Enfield Town and Cheshunt, via Seven Sisters, transferred to London Overground, along with a new station opening at Lea Bridge. In August of the same year, a direct covered walkway opened between Hackney Downs and Hackney Central on the North London Line.

In September 2019, the Lea Valley Rail Project was completed between Lea Bridge, and the new station at Meridian Water. This removed the level crossing at Northumberland Park, and added a new third platform for both there and Tottenham Hale, along with a third track.

As a result of the new Classes 720 and 745, platform extensions are necessary at many stations to allow for ten or twelve car trains to stop there, respectively. However, the Class 720 has selective door opening, so some platforms have not needed to be extended.

== Services ==
Services from Liverpool Street to Cambridge, Hertford East and Stansted Airport are operated by Greater Anglia.

Express services from Liverpool Street to Stansted Airport are operated by Stansted Express, a sub-brand of Greater Anglia.

Services from Stansted Airport to Cambridge (and onward to Birmingham New Street via Peterborough) are operated by CrossCountry.

The line is part of the Network Rail Strategic Route 5; (Note: Network Rail Strategic Route 5 comprises SRS 05.01 and part of 05.05.) it is classified as a London and South East commuter line.

In London, the line forms the Tottenham Hale branch of the Lea Valley Lines.

== Infrastructure ==
The line was initially 5 ft (1,524 mm) gauge, but, between 5 September and 7 October 1844, it was converted to 1,435 mm (4 ft 8 1/2 in) standard gauge.

Currently, the line is double tracked for most of its length, with two exceptions at Stansted Airport Tunnel and at Ware. There is also a short section of quadruple track between Hackney Downs and Bethnal Green, from which the West Anglia Main Line runs alongside the Great Eastern Main Line to London Liverpool Street as two of six tracks into the terminus. The line is electrified at 25 kV AC and has a loading gauge of W8, except for the Stansted branch which is W6.

Lineside train monitoring equipment includes hot axle box detectors (HABD) on the up main south of Newport (Note: 39 miles 48 chains from Liverpool Street.) and on the down main north of Shepreth Branch Junction. (Note: 53 miles 10 chains from Liverpool Street.) There are no wheel impact load detectors (WILD) ‘Wheelchex’ on the line.

=== Tunnels and viaducts ===
Major civil engineering structures on the West Anglia Main Line include the following:

Tunnels and viaducts on the West Anglia Main Line
Railway structure	Length	Distance from London Liverpool Street	ELR	Location
Littlebury Tunnel	407 yards (372 metres)	43 miles 46 chains – 43 miles 27 chains	BGK	Between Great Chesterford and Audley End
Audley End Tunnel	456 yards (417 metres)	43 miles 11 chains – 42 miles 70 chains	BGK	Between Great Chesterford and Audley End
Audley End Viaduct		41 miles 43 chains	BGK	South of Audley End
Newport Viaduct		40 miles 36 chains	BGK	North of Newport
Stansted Airport Tunnel	1 mile 184 yards (1778 metres)	36 miles 23 chains – 35 miles 15 chains	TLA	Stansted Airport branch
Long Bridge Viaduct (river Stort)		19 miles 16 chains (via Clapton)	BGK	South of Roydon
Hoe Street Tunnel	71 yards (65 metres)	6 miles 52 chains – 6 miles 49 chains	CJC	Chingford branch, between Wood Street and Walthamstow Central
Clapton arches (River Lea)	6 chains (c. 120 metres)	4 miles 35 chains – 4 miles 29 chains	BGK	Clapton line, north of Clapton
Clapton Tunnel	284 yards (260 metres)	3 miles 66 chains – 3 miles 53 chains	BGK	Clapton line, between Clapton and Hackney Downs
Hackney Downs or Queens Road Tunnel	445 yards (407 metres)	3 miles 39 chains – 3 miles 19 chains	BGK	Clapton line, between Clapton and Hackney Downs
Theobalds Grove arches	10 chains (c. 200 metres)	13 miles 51 chains – 13 miles 41 chains	HDT	Stoke Newington line, Theobalds Grove
White Hart Lane arches	10 chains (c. 200 metres)	7 miles 03 chains – 6 miles 73 chains	HDT	Stoke Newington line, south of White Hart Lane
Stoke Newington Tunnel	60 yards (55 metres)	4 miles 22 chains – 4 miles 19 chains	HDT	Stoke Newington line, north of Stoke Newington
Bethnal Green – Hackney viaducts	c. 2.5 miles (3900 metres)	3 miles 43 chains – 1 miles 10 chains	BGK	
Bishopsgate Tunnel	627 yards (573 metres)	0 miles 56 chains – 0 miles 27 chains	LTN	

== Locomotives and rolling stock ==
Throughout the steam era trains were predominantly hauled by Great Eastern Railway (or its constituent companies') locomotives. When steam ended in East Anglia in the 1960s, some of these locomotives were still operated. (Note: See Stratford TMD and Great Eastern Railway articles for more detail.) After the Grouping of 1923, LNER-designed locomotives were used with the B17 4-6-0 class working many main line services. Following nationalisation in 1948, British Railways introduced the Britannia 4-6-2 class on some main line services, until they were succeeded by diesel locomotives in the late 1950s.

East Anglia was the first area to be worked completely by diesel-hauled trains with Class 31s taking over some express workings. These were succeeded by more powerful Classes 37 and 47, until full electrification to King's Lynn in 1987 when Class 86 electric locomotives took over.

Suburban services from about 1958 were operated by Class 125 DMUs and, following the 1969 electrification, Classes 305 and 308 electric multiple units. Other units from the Great Eastern section, such as Classes 302 and 306, also operated services during this period, with Class 310s operating temporarily once electrification to Cambridge was complete. These first-generation units were replaced soon after by Classes 315 and 317.

In 2011, new Bombardier Class 379s began operation, mainly to replace Class 317s from Stansted Express duties to main line services which, in turn, relocated Class 315s to inner suburban routes. Class 170 DMUs operate from Stansted Airport north through Cambridge to Birmingham on CrossCountry services.

In 2020, new Class 745s were introduced on Stansted Express services, cascading the Class 379s to other WAML services. The delayed Class 720s began to replace both Classes 317 and 379 on the route on 25 August 2021, with full fleet replacement on this route completed in August 2022.

== Future developments ==
It seems likely that two tracks will be built alongside the line to Cheshunt as part of Crossrail 2. Intermediate stations from Tottenham Hale will transfer to Crossrail 2, releasing capacity on the main line for additional trains. In August 2019, it was announced that funding had been approved for four-tracking and related platform construction work between Tottenham Hale and Meridian Water to enable up to eight trains per hour to make local stops in this section at peak times.

East West Rail are also proposing to add two additional tracks next to the West Anglia Main Line between the Shepreth Branch Junction and Cambridge.
