= Queens Road (GER) railway station =

Proposed railway station in London, England

Queens Road

General information
- Location: England
- Platforms: 2

Other information
- Status: Disused

History
- Original company: Great Eastern Railway

Key dates
- August 1892: never opened

Queens Road was a proposed railway station in the London Borough of Hackney. It was to be on the Great Eastern Railway's connection of the Chingford branch line and the former Northern and Eastern Railway Cambridge line to Hackney Downs. The line was completed in August 1892, but the station was never built. The platforms were built and survived until 1965,

== Services ==
Preceding station	National Rail	Following station
Clapton	Great Eastern Railway; Lea Valley Lines	Hackney Downs
