= St. James Street railway station =

London Overground station

St. James Street
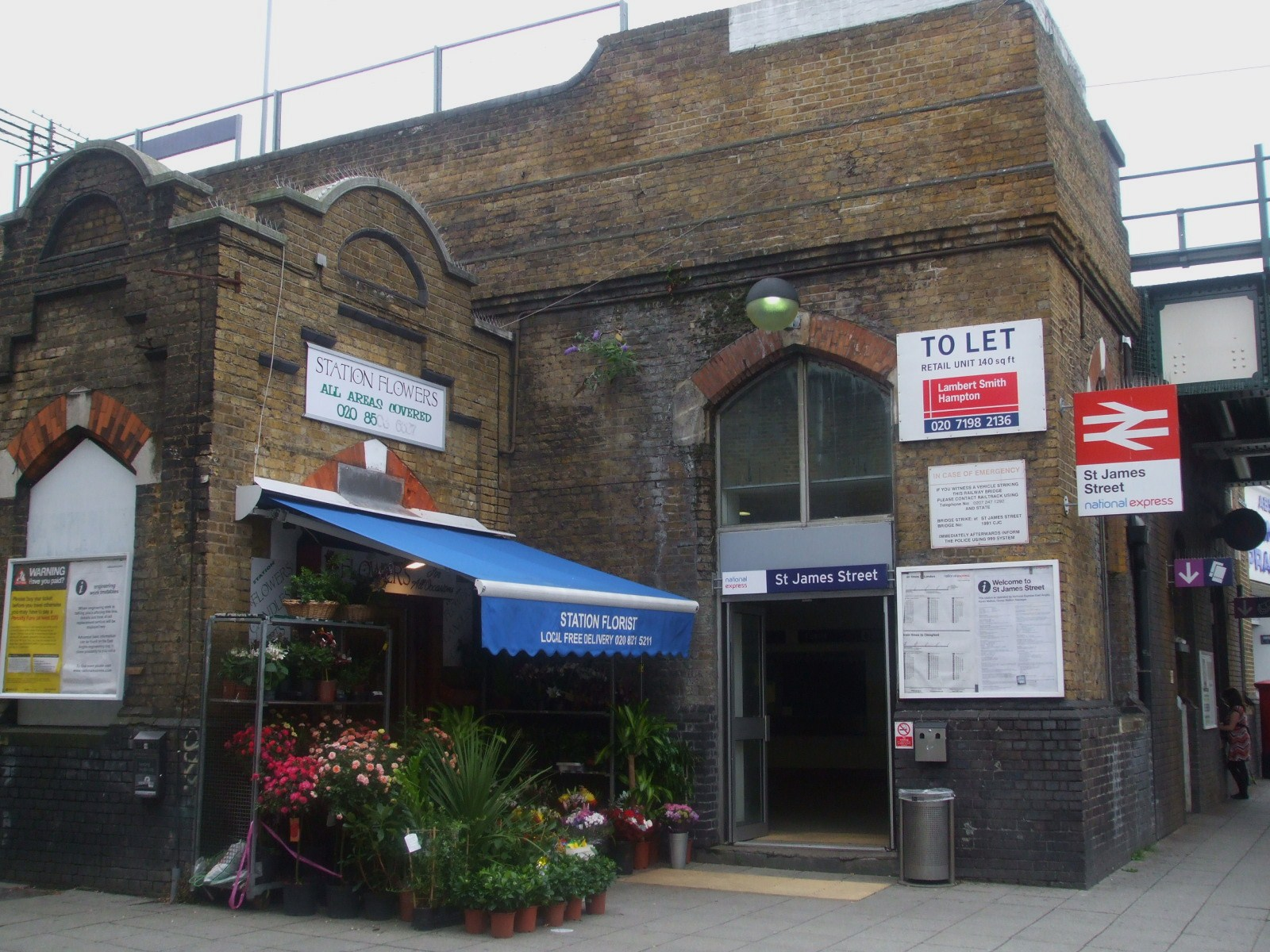
- Interactive map of St. James Street

General information
- Location: Walthamstow
- Local authority: London Borough of Waltham Forest
- Managed by: London Overground
- Station code: SJS
- DfT category: D
- Number of platforms: 2
- Fare zone: 3

National Rail annual entry and exit
- 2020–21: ▼0.460 million
- 2021–22: ▲0.982 million
- 2022–23: ▲1.248 million
- 2023–24: ▲1.559 million
- 2024–25: ▼1.552 million

Railway companies
- Original company: Great Eastern Railway
- Pre-grouping: Great Eastern Railway
- Post-grouping: London and North Eastern Railway; British Railways

Key dates
- 26 April 1870: opened

Other information
- External links: Departures; Facilities
- Coordinates: 51.581°N 0.0323°W

St. James Street is a station on the Weaver line of the London Overground, located in Walthamstow in the London Borough of Waltham Forest, east London. It is 5 miles 55 chains (9.2 km) down the line from London Liverpool Street and is situated between Clapton and Walthamstow Central on the Chingford branch line. The station is in London fare zone 3.

== History ==
Located in Walthamstow, St. James Street station opens onto the street of the same name. This section of the A1006 route is the local high street. Shoppers have an easy route from the southernmost end of the market to the railway station, which provides a fast and regular route to the top of the market at Walthamstow Central or into central London at Liverpool Street.

After the transfer of the "West Anglian" portion of the former West Anglia Great Northern franchise to National Express East Anglia, the station was redeveloped. A dual staircase was constructed, allowing passengers to access the platform without passing through the main body of the station itself, and permitting the ticket office to be locked overnight. These have been closed off since the transfer to London Overground in 2015 to enforce a new ticket barrier inside the station which is staffed during all opening hours.

== Services ==
Trains are operated as part of the Weaver line of the London Overground.

The typical service pattern (throughout the week, including Sundays) is:

- 4 trains per hour (tph) to London Liverpool Street;
- 4 tph to Chingford.

Early morning trains run every half hour on weekdays and Saturdays before 07:00.

== Connections ==
London Buses routes 158, 212, 230, 275, W11 and 675 serve the station.

Preceding station	London Overground	Following station
Clapton towards Liverpool Street	Weaver line Lea Valley lines	Walthamstow Central towards Chingford
Disused Railways
Lea Bridge	Great Eastern Railway; Hall Farm Curve	Walthamstow Central
