= Queens Road station =

Queens Road station may refer to these stations in London:

- Queens Road Peckham railway station
- Queens Road (GER) railway station, a proposed station
- Queensway tube station, formerly called Queen's Road
- Walthamstow Queen's Road railway station
- Queenstown Road railway station formerly called Queen's Road (Battersea)
