= Stratford station =

London Underground, Docklands Light Railway and National rail station

Stratford
- Stratford Regional
- Stratford (London)
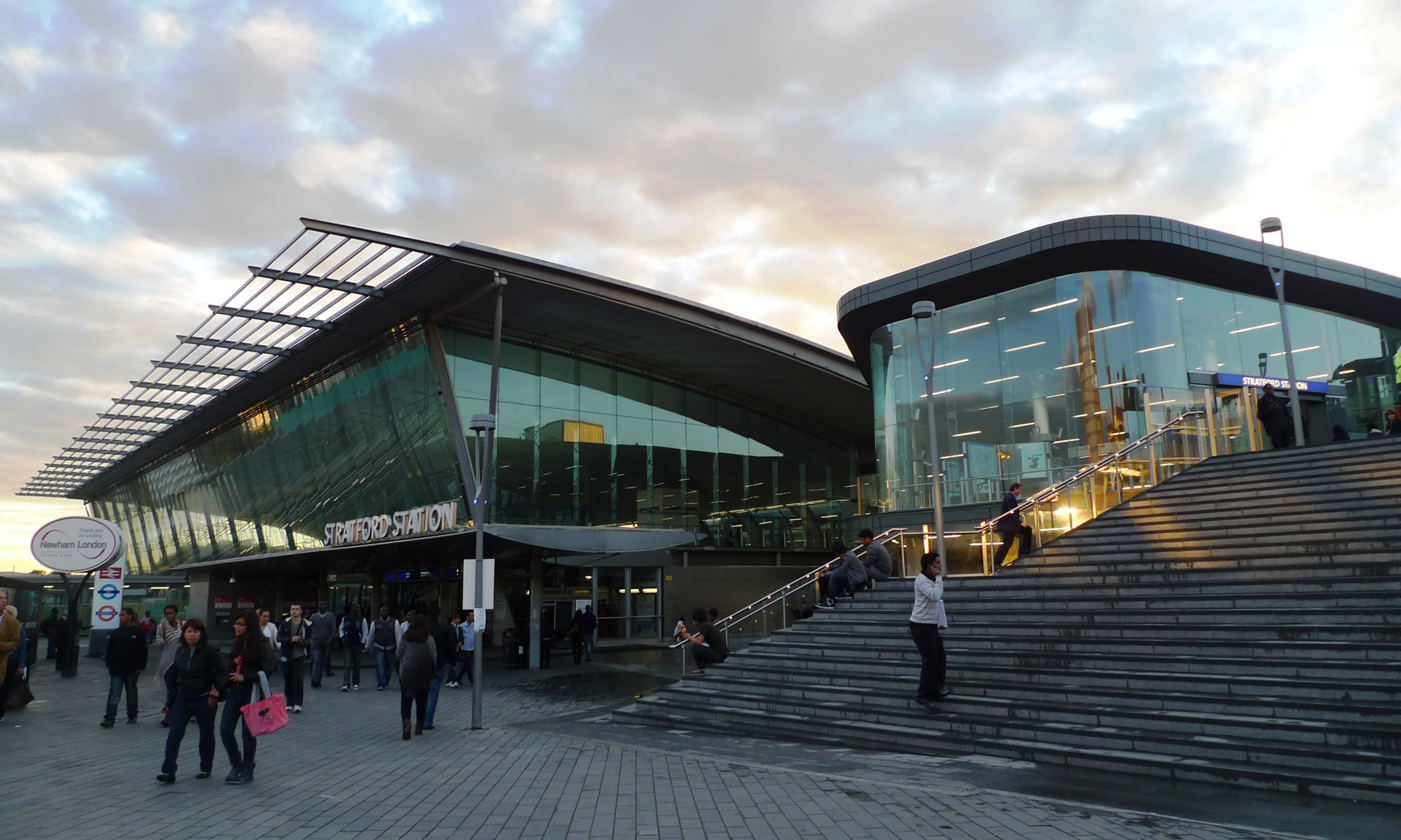
- The station's south entrance
- Interactive map of Stratford

General information
- Location: Stratford
- Local authority: London Borough of Newham
- Managed by: Elizabeth line
- Owner: Network Rail Transport for London
- Station code: SRA
- DfT category: B
- Number of platforms: 19 (17 in use)
- Accessible: Yes
- Fare zone: 2 and 3

London Underground annual entry and exit
- 2021: ▲29.11 million
- 2022: ▲47.88 million
- 2023: ▲54.38 million
- 2024: ▼53.38 million
- 2025: ▼53.19 million

DLR annual boardings and alightings
- 2021: ▲9.977 million
- 2022: No data (Note: DLR passenger data for 2022 is included in the London Underground figure.)
- 2023: No data (Note: DLR passenger data for 2023 is included in the London Underground figure.)
- 2024: No data (Note: DLR passenger data for 2024 is included in the London Underground figure.)
- 2025: No data (Note: DLR passenger data for 2025 is included in the London Underground figure.)

National Rail annual entry and exit
- 2020–21: ▼13.985 million
- Interchange: ▼1.746 million
- 2021–22: ▲28.182 million
- Interchange: ▲3.184 million
- 2022–23: ▲44.137 million
- Interchange: ▲5.524 million
- 2023–24: ▲56.571 million
- Interchange: ▲5.542 million
- 2024–25: ▼51.474 million
- Interchange: ▼4.874 million

Key dates
- 20 June 1839: Opened by ECR
- 4 December 1946: Central line started
- 31 August 1987: DLR started
- 14 May 1999: Jubilee line started

Other information
- External links: TfL station info page; Departures; Facilities
- Coordinates: 51.5422°N 0.0033°W

Stratford is a major multi-level interchange station serving the town of Stratford and the mixed-use development known as Stratford City, in the London Borough of Newham, east London for London Underground, London Overground, Docklands Light Railway (DLR) and Elizabeth line services. National Rail services also operate on the West Anglia Main Line and the Great Eastern Main Line, 4 miles 3 chains (6.5 km) from Liverpool Street.

It is the seventh busiest railway station in Britain, the second busiest station in London outside the London station group, and is the busiest station on the London Underground network outside London fare zone 1.

On the London Underground, Stratford is on the Central line between Mile End and Leyton stations. It is also the eastern terminus of the Jubilee line and the next station towards west is West Ham. On the DLR, it is a terminus for some trains and for others it is a through-station between Stratford High Street and Stratford International. On the Overground, it is the terminus of the Mildmay line; on the main line it is served by Elizabeth line stopping services between Paddington and Shenfield and by medium- and longer-distance services operated by Greater Anglia to and from numerous destinations in the East of England. There are also limited off-peak services operated by c2c connecting to the London, Tilbury and Southend line to Shoeburyness.

The station was opened in 1839 by the Eastern Counties Railway. Today it is owned by Network Rail and is in London fare zone 2/3. To distinguish it from Stratford-upon-Avon in Warwickshire it is sometimes referred to as Stratford (London), or as Stratford Regional to differentiate it from Stratford International, which is some 400 yards (370 m) to the north. Stratford served as a key travel hub for the 2012 Olympic and Paralympic Games held in London.

== History ==
=== Early days: 1839–1862 ===
Stratford station was opened on 20 June 1839 by the Eastern Counties Railway (ECR) with the first station building being located on Angel Lane which crossed the line on an over-bridge to the east of the station. The Northern and Eastern Railway opened a section of its authorised line from Broxbourne to join the ECR at Stratford on 15 September 1840. As well as a station, a railway works was built adjacent to the line to Broxbourne. This and the engine shed later expanded into the area to the west of the station which is now occupied by a shopping centre and Stratford International station.

The ECR tracks were originally set to a gauge of 5 ft (1,524 mm) on the recommendation of engineer John Braithwaite. At this time there was no legislation dictating the choice of gauge and indeed the directors favoured the Great Western Railway's broad gauge 7 ft (2,134 mm). Braithwaite persuaded the directors otherwise on the grounds of additional cost but recommended the 5 ft gauge in an effort to reduce wear on locomotive parts. This choice meant that the Northern and Eastern Railway who were planning to share the ECR line between Stratford and Bishopsgate were forced to adopt the same gauge.

With the extension of the ECR in the early 1840s it became apparent that standard gauge 4 ft 8 1/2 in (1,435 mm) was a more realistic choice and subsequently between September and October 1844 the gauge conversion was carried out. At the same time the associated Northern and Eastern Railway was also converted.

New station buildings were built in 1847 replacing the original structure on Angel Road. These were located in the V between the Cambridge and Colchester lines and access was via Station Road.

The line through the low level platforms first opened in 1846 as a goods only branch as far as Thames Wharf. The bridge under the main line was too low for many locomotives, so a number of engines were equipped with hinged chimneys in order they could operate the line. On opening there was also a line that linked what is now known as the Great Eastern Main Line directly to the docks enabling through running from Colchester to Thames Wharf. The docks and associated railway networks expanded with passenger services to North Woolwich starting in 1847.

There was an accident at Stratford station on 18 July 1846 when an up goods train ran into the back of a passenger train from Ipswich. There were 10 passengers seriously injured one of whom later died.

In 1854 the newly opened London Tilbury and Southend Railway served Stratford joining the main line at Forest Gate Junction a few miles north. Their services generally served Fenchurch Street and were routed via the Bow Road route (although that station was not opened at this time) although some carriages were detached at Stratford for onward working to Bishopsgate. This practice was discontinued in 1856 as passengers preferred the more conveniently sited (for the city) Fenchurch Street.

In connection with the introduction of the new LTSR services a third line was built from Stratford to Bow Junction which was used by down Fenchurch Street services and a new platform face opened.

It soon became apparent that congestion was a problem at Stratford and by 1856 permission was sought to build a line from Barking to Gas Factory Junction (Bow) which was opened in 1858. After that LTSR trains were no longer routed via Stratford.

By 1855 there were links from both the low and high-level stations to the North London Line as well as a spur that enabled trains from Liverpool Street to North Woolwich to avoid Stratford altogether (although this served Stratford Market station) which was a short distance away. Services from the North London line normally started from Victoria Park and ran through to Stratford Market. This service operated from 1866 until 1874 and was operated by the GER and North London Railway in alternate years up until 31 October 1874.

The North London Railway was also running through Stratford high level with two return trains per day from Hampstead Road (later renamed Chalk Farm) via Victoria Park and Forest Gate Junctions to Tilbury which commenced on 1 July 1855 and finished 30 September.

Services to Loughton commenced on 22 August 1856 and used the Lea Valley platforms, leaving the main line at Loughton Branch Junction half a mile north of Stratford. Initially nine trains per day operated to Fenchurch Street (Bishopsgate on Sundays) on this route.

By the 1860s the railways in East Anglia were in financial trouble, and most were leased to the ECR; they wished to amalgamate formally, but could not obtain government agreement for this until 1862, when the Great Eastern Railway was formed by amalgamation. Thus Stratford became a GER station in 1862.

=== Great Eastern Railway: 1862–1923 ===
The Loughton branch was extended to Ongar on 24 April 1865 and by 1874 there were a total of 40 trains each day (10 terminating at Loughton, 18 at Epping and 12 at Ongar) with most serving the newly opened Liverpool Street although a few peak hour services continued to serve Fenchurch Street.

Even after LTSR services were routed away from Stratford in 1858 working remained intense. Following an accident in 1866 the accident report noted that "Stratford needs complete re-arranging, extending and fitting with modern improvements for working points and signals, as in its present state it appears to be quite insufficient for the traffic that passes through it". Although one of the signal boxes had interlocking fitted soon after, the poor state of GER finances saw little further work until 1877 when a significant rebuilding of Stratford took place.

Another short-lived North London Railway service operated in September and October 1866, linking Chalk Farm with Barking (again routed via Victoria Park and Forest Gate Junctions). This service was withdrawn due to congestion, and one of the services was involved in a collision on 10 September 1866 with 20 passengers being injured.

The 1877 rebuilding saw a number of changes made, which were:

- A fourth line was added from Bow Junction to Stratford;
- Western Junction (where a spur to towards the Woolwich line existed along with various crossovers) was moved further west;
- New Goods lines added on the down (north) side of the line between Western Junction and the Cambridge line platforms – changes made at Central Junction to accommodate these;
- New Goods lines between Western Junction and Maryland Point signal box (west of the current 2015 Maryland station);
- Eastern curve (which allowed up goods trains from the main line to directly access the low level line towards the docks) was re-aligned; and
- New signal boxes at Eastern, Central and Western Junctions.

Between 1886 and 1887, improvements were made to the station buildings and the canopies extended.

On 26 December 1886, a train was derailed at Stratford station as facing points had not been properly locked into position. Fortunately there was no loss of life.

By 1889, traffic on the GER had grown to such an extent, that quadrupling the section from Bethnal Green to Bow Junction and from Maryland Point-Romford was proposed. Once again significant changes which were implemented between 1891 and 1893 and included:

- Two additional lines from Bow Junction resulting in six tracks in total (named Up and Down Local, Up and Down Through and Up and Down Fenchurch Street);
- To accommodate these the Up and Down Fenchurch Street lines were slewed to the south of the formation;
- The 1877 signal boxes at Western, Central and Eastern Junctions were all replaced between 1891 and 1893; and
- Carpenters Road curve added at this time (Western Junction to Carpenters Road Junction)

In 1896, the low-level line was lowered under the main line so locomotives no longer required hinged chimneys.

By July 1897, it was apparent that the decision not to include platforms on both Through lines was causing some operational difficulty. To address this a new platform serving the Up Through line was opened in 1900.

The Fairlop Loop opened on 1 May 1903 and services generally ran as an out and back circle from either Liverpool Street or Fenchurch Street. The routing of these services was Liverpool Street – Stratford – Ilford – Fairlop Loop – Woodford – Stratford – Liverpool Street) and Liverpool Street – Stratford – Woodford – Fairlop Loop – Ilford – Stratford – Liverpool Street in the reverse direction.

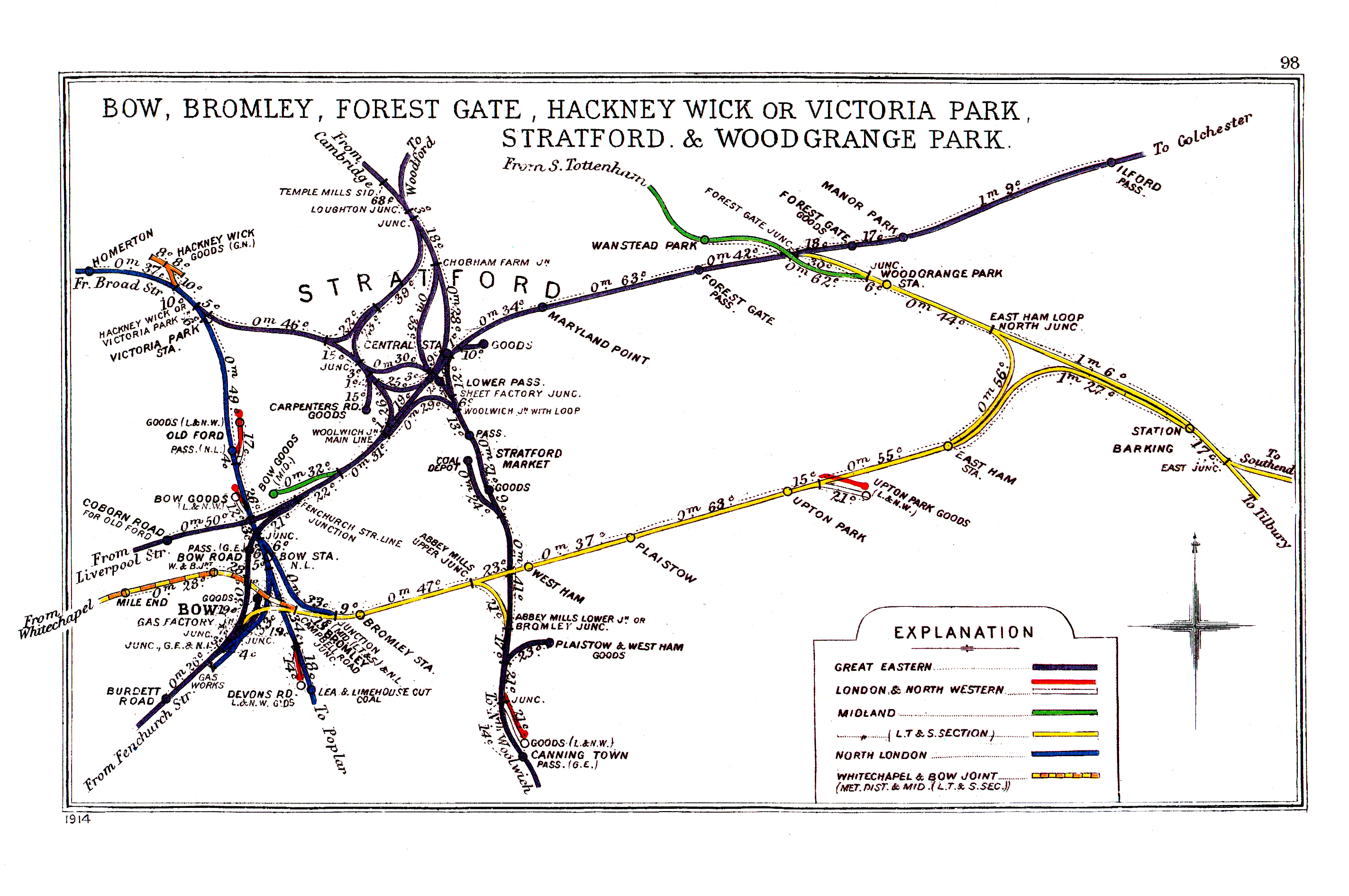
Railway lines around Stratford in 1914

On 1 January 1923, the GER became part of the London & North Eastern Railway.

=== London and North Eastern Railway: 1923–1947 ===
By the 1930s electric tramways were taking a lot of traffic from the railway and proposals were drawn up to electrify the lines from Liverpool Street to Shenfield using the 1500 V DC system. By 1938 the major contracts were let and work started. Despite the commencement of the Second World War in 1939, work was initially continued on the scheme, however, the scheme was postponed in late 1940. In February 1946, the LNER announced work would recommence. On 5 October 1946, the new interchange platforms with the Central line (see below) were opened.

London Underground Central line services started on 4 December 1946 and were extended from Liverpool Street station in new tunnels after being delayed due to the Second World War. The line was further extended to Leyton on 5 May 1947 and then to the former Great Eastern Railway branch lines to Epping, Ongar and Hainault progressively until 1957. Prior to this date trains to and from Epping and Ongar had used the currently numbered platforms 11 and 12 and diverged from the Broxbourne line about half a mile north of the station. Trains for the Hainault loop used either these platforms or the currently numbered platform 5 (up) or 8 (down) diverging from the Great Eastern Main Line at a junction between Ilford and Seven Kings which has since been redeveloped as part of the Ilford Carriage sheds.

=== British Railways: 1948–1996 ===
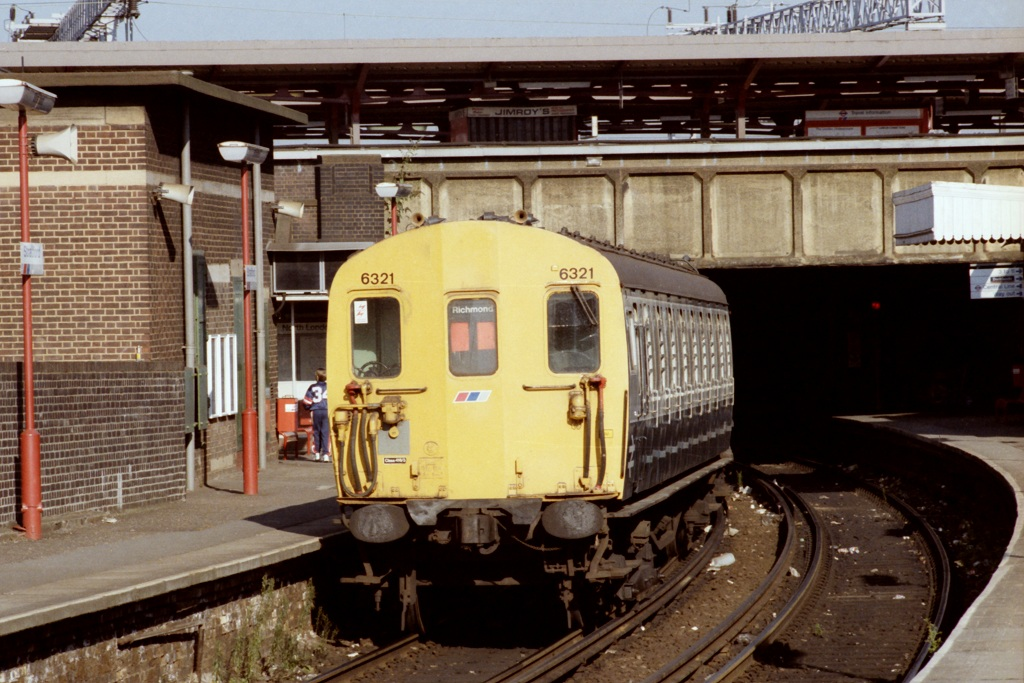
Stratford low level platforms in 1987

The nationalisation of Britain's railways saw the operation of Stratford station pass to British Railways Eastern Region. A new station building was designed by Thomas Bennett and opened in 1948.

Progress on electrification that had been halted by the Second World War resumed after the end of hostilities. The line between Liverpool Street and Stratford was electrified from 3 December 1946, and the full electrification of the Shenfield line at 1500 V DC was completed in September 1949. The electric service between Liverpool Street to Shenfield was inaugurated on 26 September 1949 but services were run to steam timings with a number of steam trains still operating. The full electric service officially commenced on 7 November 1949 (although a full dummy run had taken place the previous day). Two days earlier services to Fenchurch Street via Bow Road were withdrawn.

On 8 April 1953, 12 people were killed and 46 were injured as a result of a rear-end collision in a tunnel just to the east of Stratford station, caused by driver error after a signal failure. The Stratford tube crash was London Underground's worst accident in terms of fatalities until the Moorgate tube crash in 1975. A very similar accident had occurred in 1946 at exactly the same location, killing one railway employee.

Between 1960 and 1961, the 1,500 V DC electrification to Shenfield which had been extended to Southend and Chelmsford was converted to 6.25kV AC. In the autumn of 1980, conversion of the overhead electrification from 6.25kV AC to the standard supply of 25kV ac of the Liverpool St. to Shenfield line was completed.

The Docklands Light Railway (DLR) opened on 31 August 1987 reusing redundant rail routes through the Bow and Poplar areas to reach the new Docklands developments on the Isle of Dogs. Initially the line used one of the south facing bays which had been built for the Fenchurch street via Bow Road service (but never used).

=== Privatisation era: 1996–present ===
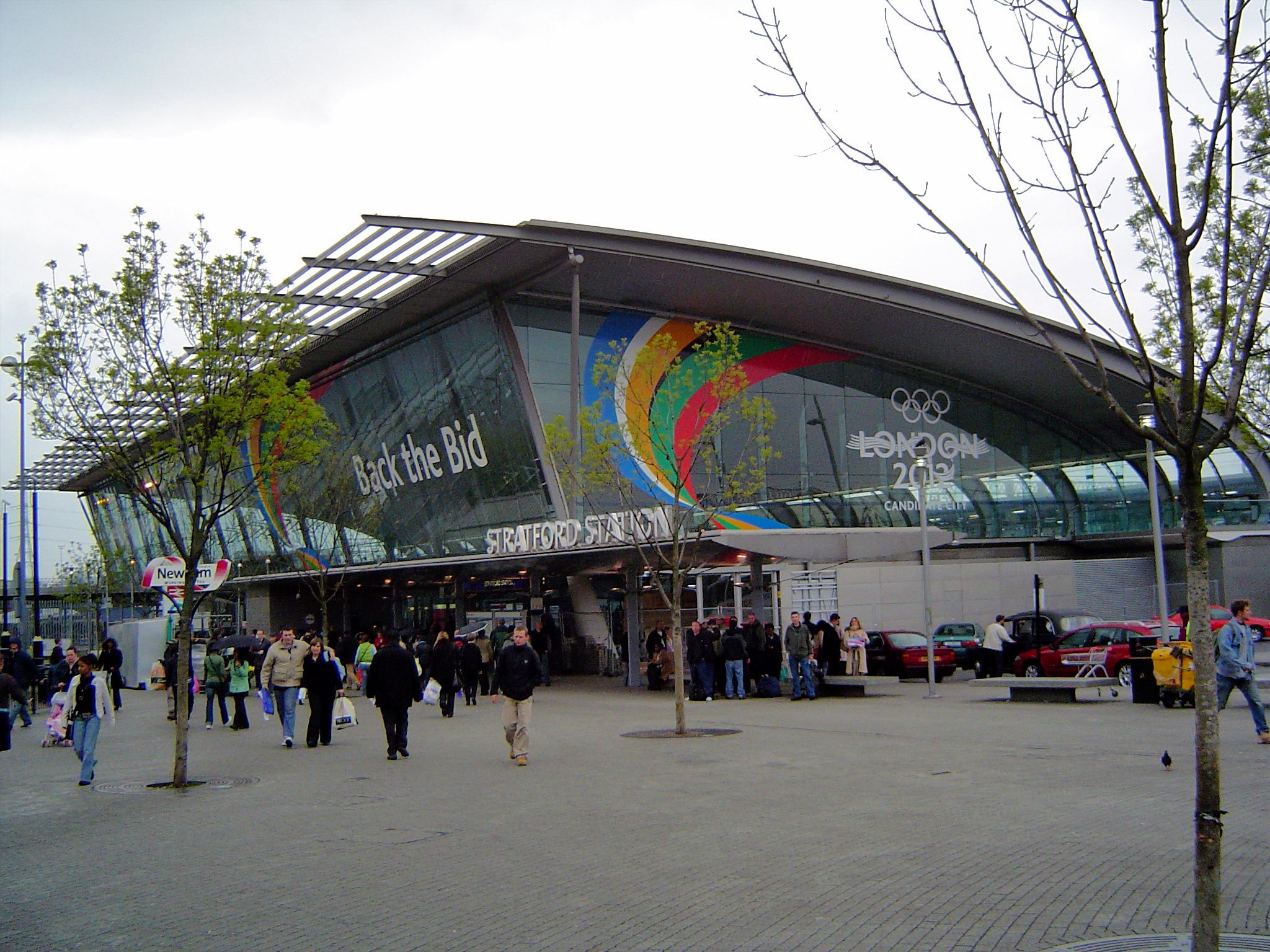
South entrance of the station in 2005

In the 1990s, the low-level station was substantially rebuilt as part of the Jubilee Line Extension works. This work included three additional surface platforms and a train crew building (designed by Troughton McAslan) and a large steel and glass building that encloses much of the low-level station, providing a new ticket hall (designed by Wilkinson Eyre). The old ticket hall, at the eastern end of the station and connected via a subway, has since been demolished. The Jubilee line opened to passengers on 14 May 1999 as far as North Greenwich station, and to Green Park and Stanmore in November 1999.

In preparation for the 2012 Olympic and Paralympic Games, the capacity of the station was tripled at a cost of around £200m, with construction work funded by the Olympic Delivery Authority (£125m) and Westfield. It was estimated that around 120,000 people would use the station at peak periods during the Games.

Construction took place between 2005 and 2011, and work included:

- New high level DLR platforms, allowing three-car trains to use the station. These platforms were designed by Will Alsop, and opened in June and September 2007.
- Expansion, reopening and refurbishment of interchange subways
- Provision of step free access to all platforms, including 14 new lifts
- Widened and lengthened platforms
- New mezzanine entrance on the south side of the station, connecting to a unpaid pedestrian link bridge over the railway funded by Westfield
- New platforms for London Overground (newly built high-level platforms 1 & 2, moving from the original low-level platforms 1 & 2). These opened in spring 2009.
- Additional Spanish solution westbound platform for the Central line. This opened in September 2010.
- New northern ticket hall built as part of the Westfield Stratford City development, adjacent to Stratford City bus station
- An extension of the DLR to Stratford International station using the old North London line route from Canning Town, using the platforms vacated by the North London line. This opened in August 2011.

Since the turn of the millennium, "passenger movements" (Note: Refers to the number of people who use the station, including those who only change train or Tube lines.) have risen from around 40 million a year in 2006 to 128 million in 2019, making it one of Britain's major rail interchanges.

The management of the station was transferred from London Underground to TfL Rail on 31 May 2015 as part of the transfer of the inner suburban service on the Great Eastern Main Line (Shenfield Metro) from Greater Anglia to TfL Rail.

From 6 November 2022, Elizabeth line services enter the central tunnel built as part of the Crossrail project, allowing direct trains to Heathrow and Reading via Paddington. All trains, save for some early morning, late night and peak hour services, go via Whitechapel.

Work started in 2023 to add a new entrance to the station at its southwestern corner, adjacent to the Jubilee line concourse, allowing access to the Carpenters Estate. This will reducing walking time for local residents by up to 20 minutes. The new entrance opened on 10 July 2024.

== Station layout ==
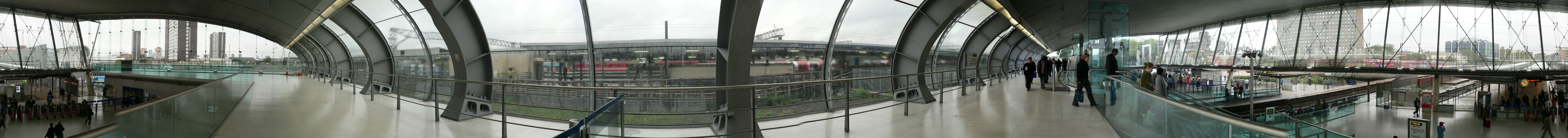
A 360° view taken in 2005 of the canopy structure housing the ticket hall. The high-level station is through the windows in the centre, the low-level station is on the right, with the gates to the Jubilee line (now removed) on the far left.

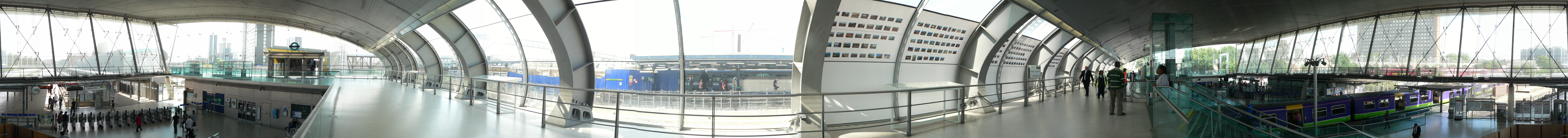
The same view in 2008. Note the new DLR platforms on the left, and the additional westbound Central line platform under construction through the windows in the left-centre.

=== High-level platforms ===
The high-level platforms run at right angles to the low-level, roughly east–west. The Docklands Light Railway serving platforms 16 and 17 passes beneath the high-level station. Except for platforms 4A and 4B, access from the main station entrance is via subways, one of which links the Jubilee line platforms directly to platforms 3 and 5 to 10. Another subway, which had served the old entrance to the station, was re-opened in September 2010.

- Platforms 1 and 2 are used by the London Overground's Mildmay line. They comprise an island platform with a step-free link to platform 12 and the subways linking to platforms 3 to 11. The platforms can accommodate trains with up to six carriages, though at present, due to short platforms elsewhere, shorter trains are used.
- Platforms 3, 3A and 6 are used by the London Underground Central line, which come above ground from their tunnels here and then immediately descend back under ground upon departure from Stratford. Platforms 3 and 6 are island platforms providing cross-platform interchange with the Elizabeth line and weekend c2c services operating from platforms 5 and 8 respectively, while platform 3A has a direct step-free connection at mezzanine level, facilitating easier interchange with Jubilee line trains on platforms 13 to 15 and DLR trains on platforms 4A and 4B. Westbound Central line trains travelling towards central London open doors on both sides so that passengers can alight and board trains from either platform, reducing dwell times and peak-hour congestion in the passageways.
- Platforms 4 and 7 are disused. When the main line to Shenfield was electrified in the 1940s there was an intention to run a shuttle service from Fenchurch Street to Stratford, calling at Stepney East (now Limehouse) and Bow Road, which would have terminated at these bay platforms. However, this service was never introduced (despite all the works required being carried out). From the 1980s platform 4 was used as the terminus of the DLR while platform 7 remained abandoned. In 2007, platform 4 was abandoned again as the DLR moved to two new platforms to the south of platform 4, though these are signposted as "platform 4" within the station.
- Platforms 4A and 4B (signposted as "platform 4") are used by the DLR for services to Poplar, Canary Wharf, Greenwich and Lewisham. They are formed of an island platform, and are not accessed by the subways but through a separate entrance on the upper level of the main concourse.
- Platforms 5 and 8 are used by Elizabeth line stopping services on the electric line between Paddington and Shenfield. They may also be used by some Greater Anglia-operated main line trains to and from Southend Victoria. Weekend c2c trains call on the way to or from Liverpool Street connecting to or from the London, Tilbury and Southend line via Barking. Cross-platform interchange is available with the Central line running from platforms 3 and 6 respectively.
- Platforms 9, 10 and 10A are used by Greater Anglia services on the main line out of Liverpool Street towards Norwich and intermediate stations and branch lines. Originally there were only two platforms here, but in the 1990s the station buildings on platform 9 were demolished to make an island platform with faces on both sides. The new face became number 9, the former 9 became 10, and the previous platform 10 became 10A.
- Platforms 11 and 12 are used for the Greater Anglia services to Bishop's Stortford that start from Stratford. There is currently a half-hourly service Mondays to Saturdays, with additional services to and from Hertford East, Harlow Town, Broxbourne or Cambridge in the peak hours with a half-hourly service to Hertford East on Sundays. In 2021 these platforms were additionally used for London Overground's North London line.

=== Low-level platforms ===
These platforms are at ground level and run north–south. Platforms 13 to 16 are served by a footbridge (with lifts and escalators) from the main station entrance, while platform 17 adjoins directly onto the main station concourse.

- Platforms 13 to 15 were built in the late 1990s to serve the Jubilee line when it was extended to Stratford in 1999. All three are bay platforms. A footbridge joins the platforms at the southern end, away from the main station building. Since 2018, almost all trains use platforms 14 and 15 (an island platform), with platform 13 only seeing a few trains at either end of the day (including Night Tube services).
- Platforms 16 and 17 (known as platforms 1 and 2 until 2009) originally served trains from Palace Gates in north London to North Woolwich, but this service has since been discontinued. In the 1980s, North London line trains from Richmond to Broad Street were diverted to run via these platforms to North Woolwich. Following the closure of the line to North Woolwich in 2006, these effectively became terminus platforms, with trains departing westbound only towards Richmond. Following the North London line trains moving to new platforms 1 and 2 on the high level, they were converted in 2011 for use by DLR services: platform 16 is for northbound trains to Stratford International and platform 17 is for southbound trains via Canning Town to Woolwich Arsenal. The new platforms have also been built with a reversing siding immediately to the south, accessible from both running lines. This enables trains from Stratford International to terminate at Stratford and trains from Canning Town to also terminate here. There is also a crossover immediately to the north, allowing trains from the southbound platform to reverse onto the northbound line back to Stratford International.

== Services ==
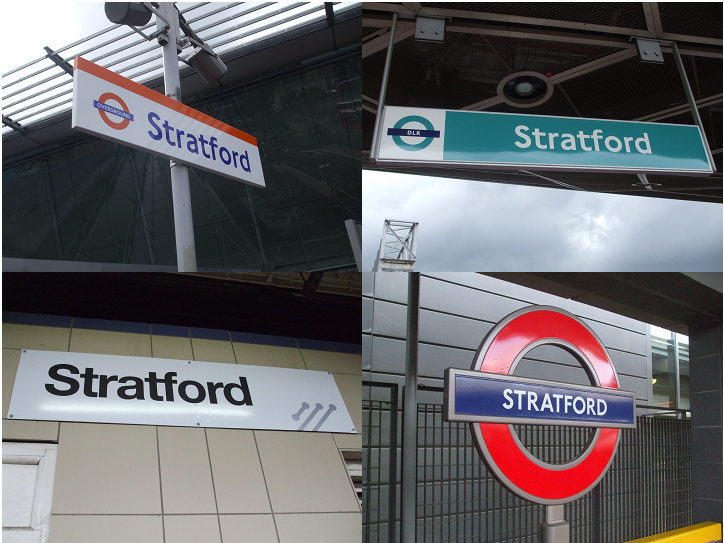
Different platform signage, clockwise from top left: on London Overground platforms, Docklands Light Railway, Jubilee line, and main line (National Express East Anglia) (2008)

Stratford is a major rail hub with services operated by Greater Anglia, London Overground (on the Mildmay line), the Elizabeth line and London Underground (on the Central and Jubilee lines). The typical off-peak service in trains per hour (tph) is:

Operator/line	Frequency to destination
London Underground; Central line	9 tph to Ealing Broadway; 9 tph to West Ruislip; 3 tph to Northolt; 3 tph to White City
London Underground; Central line	9 tph to Hainault (via Newbury Park); 3 tph to Newbury Park; 9 tph to Epping; 3 tph to Loughton
London Underground; Jubilee line	12 tph to Stanmore; 4 tph to Wembley Park; 4 tph to Willesden Green 4 tph to West Hampstead
Elizabeth line	6 tph to Paddington
Elizabeth line	2 tph to Heathrow Terminal 5
Elizabeth line	8 tph to Shenfield
London Overground; Mildmay line	4 tph to Richmond; 4 tph to Clapham Junction
Docklands Light Railway	12 tph to Canary Wharf via Poplar
Docklands Light Railway	8 tph to Stratford International
Docklands Light Railway	8 tph to Woolwich Arsenal via London City Airport
Greater Anglia	7 tph (+ 1 tph to set down only) to London Liverpool Street
Greater Anglia	East Anglia; 3 tph to Southend Victoria; 1 tph to Norwich (pick up only); 1 tph to Braintree; 1 tph to Clacton-on-Sea; 1 tph to Colchester Town; 1 tph to Ipswich
Greater Anglia	West Anglia; 2 tph to Bishop's Stortford; 2 tph to Meridian Water
c2c (weekends only)	2 tph to Shoeburyness; 2 tph to London Liverpool Street

Preceding station	London Underground	Following station
Mile End towards Ealing Broadway or West Ruislip	Central line	Leyton towards Epping, Hainault or Woodford via Newbury Park
West Ham towards Stanmore	Jubilee line	Terminus
Preceding station	DLR	Following station
Pudding Mill Lane towards Lewisham	Docklands Light Railway	Terminus
Stratford International Terminus	Docklands Light Railway	Stratford High Street towards Woolwich Arsenal
Preceding station	London Overground	Following station
Hackney Wick towards Clapham Junction or Richmond	Mildmay line North London line and West London line	Terminus
Preceding station	Elizabeth line	Following station
Whitechapel towards Heathrow Terminal 5	Elizabeth line	Maryland towards Shenfield
Liverpool Street Terminus	Elizabeth line	Maryland towards Shenfield
Preceding station	National Rail	Following station
London Liverpool Street	c2c Connection to LTS Line (Limited services)	Barking
London Liverpool Street	Greater Anglia Great Eastern Main Line	Romford
London Liverpool Street	Greater Anglia Great Eastern Main Line	Shenfield
Terminus	Greater Anglia Temple Mills branch line	Lea Bridge
Disused Railways
Coborn Road for Old Ford; Line open, station closed	Great Eastern Railway; Great Eastern Main Line	Maryland Point; Line and station open
Coborn Road for Old Ford; Line open, station closed	Great Eastern Railway; Lea Valley lines	Lea Bridge; Line and station open
Coborn Road for Old Ford; Line open, station closed	Great Eastern Railway; Eastern Counties Railway; Loughton branch	Leyton; Line closed, station open
Ilford	Great Eastern Railway; Hall Farm Curve	Lea Bridge
Coborn Road for Old Ford	Great Eastern Railway; Hall Farm Curve	Lea Bridge
Coborn Road for Old Ford	Great Eastern Railway; Palace Gates line	Lea Bridge
Stratford Market	Great Eastern Railway; Palace Gates line	Lea Bridge
Bow Road	Great Eastern Railway; Bow Curve	Terminus
Hackney Wick	Silverlink; North London line	West Ham
Highbury & Islington	Anglia Railways; London Crosslink	Romford

== Electrification ==
All lines at Stratford are electrified, although a few passenger and freight services which pass through this station are hauled by diesel locomotives. At one time there were four different systems of electrification in use, a record for any station in London. However, since the diversion of the North London line from the low-level to the new high-level platforms these trains have changed the electrical system they use while at this station. The remaining systems used are:

- 25 kV 50 Hz overhead on Network Rail lines, including Mildmay line (high level)
- 630 V DC fourth rail on London Underground Central and Jubilee lines
- 750 V DC bottom-contact conductor rail on Docklands Light Railway
- Since April 2009, 750 V DC third rail is no longer used at this station. This was used for the London Overground (low level) North London line services.

In 1949, the Great Eastern Main Line through Stratford was electrified at 1,500 V DC overhead before being converted to 6.25 kV AC 50 Hz overhead in 1960 and converted again to 25 kV in about 1976.

== Nearby facilities ==
=== Goods facilities ===
There were three primary goods facilities in the Stratford area in the steam age, although the nearby Stratford Works and engine shed generated their own traffic. A short distance to the north of Stratford station (on the line to Cambridge) there were marshalling yards at Temple Mills. There was a small goods yard north of the station on the east side of the line which occupied a constrained site. The mainstay of traffic was domestic coal although shortly before closure in the 1960s the site was used as a reception point for concrete components for the building of tower blocks in Newham.

There was a small depot at Carpenters Road about a quarter of a mile south of Stratford station. Opened in 1900, the depot consisted of four long sidings and primarily dealt with coal and building materials. It was closed on 7 December 1964.

There was a large depot at Stratford Market railway station. All of these three facilities were operated by the Great Eastern Railway up until 1923 before being taken over by the London & North Eastern Railway until nationalisation in 1948 when they became part of British Railways Eastern Region.

There was also a goods terminal at Bow operated by the Midland Railway which is still open today mostly for building materials. This yard operated as the terminal for building materials for the adjacent Olympics site.

Between Stratford and Maryland stations Windmill Lane cattle pens existed on the down side of the line whilst four private sidings belonging to Young & Martens were located on the up side.

During the 1960s part of the Stratford Works site was converted to the London International Freight Terminal (LIFT) which opened in 1967 and there was a freight liner terminal that operated on the far side of the Stratford railway complex (on the Channelsea Loop line) between 1967 and 1994. The former site is now occupied by the international station and shopping centre.

=== Stratford International ===
The nearby Stratford International station opened on 30 November 2009 (for preview services only). Since 13 December 2009 Southeastern began its full domestic high-speed service between London St Pancras, directly to Ebbsfleet International and Ashford in Kent. The Docklands Light Railway 'Stratford International' extension has provided a link between the two stations since 31 August 2011. There is also a walking route between the two stations passing through Westfield Stratford City Shopping Centre.

Despite Stratford International's name, no international trains call there, and Eurostar (currently the only international operator) has no plans to do so. Passengers instead interconnect on high-speed trains travelling to London St Pancras.

=== Stratford City ===
In preparation for the Olympics and the Stratford City development, a new north-facing exit and ticket hall has been built. Both existing passenger subways have been extended north to connect with the ticket hall, and the abandoned subway at the eastern end of the station, which formed part of the old station complex, has been reopened and refurbished to allow interchange between platforms 3–12 and the new high-level platforms 1 & 2. A new pedestrian bridge has also been built to connect Stratford shopping centre with the Stratford City development. This also connects the mezzanine-level ticket hall with the northern one. The northern ticket hall and the footbridge opened along with Westfield Stratford City on 13 September 2011.

=== Bus stations ===
Stratford bus station is to the south of the station and Stratford City bus station is to the north. Both are served by bus services right across London and to the Queen Elizabeth Olympic Park.

== Future proposals ==
In the 2020s, plans to rebuild the station are being considered. "Passenger movements" (Note: Refers to the number of people who use the station, including those who only change train or Tube lines.) have grown by 90 million in 13 years, and this is predicted to rise by 60% by 2041, leading to overcrowding. Three different plans have been outlined, ranging from "modest changes to a major redevelopment of the station". Redevelopment would also include transit-oriented development including new homes and offices.
