= Stratford tube crash =

1953 London Underground crash

Details
- Date: 8 April 1953; 18:56
- Location: Stratford station, London
- Country: England
- Line: Central line
- Operator: London Transport
- Cause: Driver error

Statistics
- Trains: 2
- Passengers: ~900
- Deaths: 12
- Injured: 46

The Stratford tube crash occurred on 8 April 1953, on the Central line of the London Underground. 12 people died and 46 were injured as a result of a rear-end collision in a tunnel, caused by driver error after a signal failure. This was the worst accident involving trains on the London Underground until the Moorgate tube crash in 1975. A similar accident at exactly the same location, occurred in 1946, before the line was open for public traffic; one railwayman died.

== Collision ==
The Central line was extended from Liverpool Street to Stratford in November 1946, and was extended further to Leytonstone in 1948.

A signal (A491) in the tunnel between Stratford and Leyton had been damaged, and this and the preceding signal (A489) were showing a permanent red aspect. Trains were being worked slowly past the failed signals under the "Stop and Proceed" rule, under which trains should proceed with extreme caution, typically less than 10 mph (16 km/h). However, one train collided with the back of another which was waiting at signal A491, and the first and second coaches of the colliding train were partially telescoped.

12 people were killed, with 5 people suffering serious injuries and 41 people slightly injured.

== Investigation ==
The Inspecting Officer considered that the extent of the damage suggested the speed was in the region of 15–20 mph (24–32 km/h), and when the driver had passed signal A489, he had simply coasted down the steep down gradient, not expecting to find another train before the next signal. The driver claimed to have been travelling slowly and that his vision had been obscured by a cloud of dust, but it was felt his memory could have been affected by concussion.

== Memorial ==
A memorial plaque to the accident was unveiled at Stratford Station on 8 April 2016 by Lyn Brown, Member of Parliament for West Ham. Members of the families of those killed in the crash were also in attendance along with Mike Brown, Commissioner of Transport for London.

== 1946 accident ==
The 5 December 1946 accident occurred, remarkably, at the same signal with exactly the same cause; the second train was travelling too fast under the "Stop and Proceed" rule. The line descends steeply into tunnel at this point so that a coasting train accelerates faster than usual, and a curve slightly restricts forward visibility. At this stage only empty trains were running, reversing at Leyton.
