= Lea Bridge railway station =

Railway station in Greater London, England

Lea Bridge
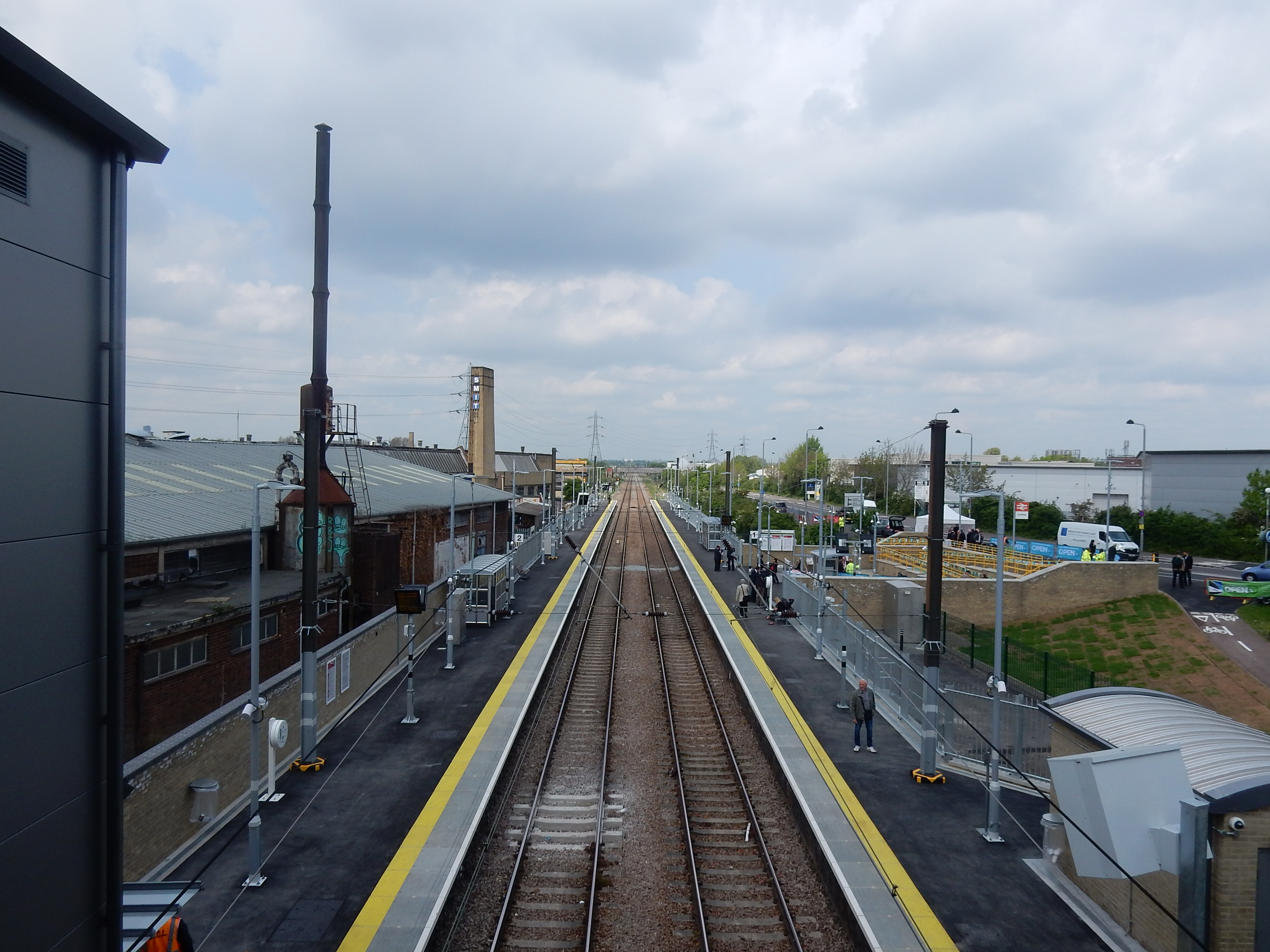
- Lea Bridge Station on day of opening, 16 May 2016
- Interactive map of Lea Bridge

General information
- Location: Leyton/Lea Bridge
- Local authority: London Borough of Waltham Forest
- Grid reference: TQ362872
- Managed by: Greater Anglia
- Owner: Network Rail
- Station code: LEB
- Number of platforms: 2
- Accessible: Yes
- Fare zone: 3

National Rail annual entry and exit
- 2020–21: ▼0.255 million
- 2021–22: ▲0.486 million
- 2022–23: ▲0.617 million
- 2023–24: ▲0.826 million
- 2024–25: ▲0.877 million

Key dates
- 15 September 1840: Opened as Lea Bridge Road by the Northern and Eastern Railway
- 1841: Renamed to Lea Bridge
- 8 July 1985: Closed
- 15 May 2016: Reopened

Other information
- External links: Departures; Facilities
- Coordinates: 51.5665°N 0.0366°W

Lea Bridge is a railway station on the line between Stratford and Tottenham Hale on the Lea Valley Lines, which reopened on 15 May 2016 with the full service beginning on 16 May 2016, operated by Greater Anglia.

The station is located on Argall Way, close to its junction with Lea Bridge Road (A104) and Orient Way, serving the areas of Lea Bridge and Leyton in the London Borough of Waltham Forest, east London. The original station operated from 1840 to 1985 and was accessed via the north side of Lea Bridge Road as it crosses the tracks.

== History ==
=== 19th century ===
The station was opened on 15 September 1840 by the Northern and Eastern Railway as Lea Bridge Road and is thought to be the earliest example of a station having its building on a road bridge, with staircases down to the platforms. The original station building was an attractive Italianate style structure designed by Sancton Wood (1815–1886) and featured a bell turret on the roof with a bell that was rung when a train was due. The line was initially laid to a gauge of 5 ft (1,524 mm) but already this had been identified as non-standard, and between 5 September and 7 October 1844 the whole network was re-laid to 4 ft 8 1/2 in (1,435 mm) standard gauge.

The Northern and Eastern Railway was leased by the Eastern Counties Railway, which operated the station. The ECR became part of the Great Eastern Railway (GER) in 1862. The GER established its signal works (which included a dummy signal box) on the eastern side of the line; the works were demolished in 1939 and replaced by a parcels depot. To the south of the station were the large Temple Mills marshalling yards, and the station would have seen large numbers of goods trains passing. In 1870 a line was opened to Shern Hall Street station (a temporary station located west of the present-day Wood Street station) and a shuttle service operated between Lea Bridge and Shern Hall Street, commencing traffic on 24 April 1870. Prior to this, a horse-drawn omnibus operating between Walthamstow and Lea Bridge had met all trains arriving at the station. The station was renamed Lea Bridge in 1841.

=== 20th century ===
In 1923 the GER became part of the London and North Eastern Railway (LNER). In the Summer of 1928, the Lea Bridge Stadium was constructed with one of the four stadium entrances directly opposite the railway station.

In the 1930s the station was served by trains to Liverpool Street (via Stratford), to North Woolwich (via Stratford low level platforms), and to Hertford East and Palace Gates. At that time there were Sunday services via the Hall Farm curve to the Chingford branch. On 31 March 1944, the station building was gutted by fire, although the frontage survived. After World War II, in 1948, the railways of the UK were nationalised, and operation of the station passed to British Railways Eastern Region. The Hall Farm spur line through to the Chingford branch was rarely used and, despite being electrified in 1960, the line was lifted in 1967. Palace Gates trains had also ended by this time, with the branch's closure in January 1963 seeing all services henceforth terminating at Tottenham Hale.

=== Closure ===
The station became an unstaffed halt in 1976 and the station building was demolished at about that time. By then, the only trains serving Lea Bridge were those operating between Tottenham Hale and North Woolwich via Stratford (low level platforms), and the withdrawal of that service led to the closure of the station on 8 July 1985. The simple open-sided shelter, located on the road bridge over the tracks, and which had replaced the original station buildings, was also demolished in 1985.

The last train consisted of a two-car Cravens Class 105 DMU.

=== Re-opening ===
In December 2005 a new service to and from Stratford reintroduced regular passenger trains passing through the closed station.

For many years, plans were under consideration to rebuild and reopen the station and the nearby Hall Farm Curve junction, as part of wider plans for the redevelopment of the Stratford and Lower Lea Valley area. In January 2013 it was announced that plans had been approved to rebuild and reopen the station. Construction on the £6.5m scheme was planned to start in spring 2014. The station was included in Network Rail's Route Specification for Anglia in 2014 for opening within the next five years.

In October 2013, the overgrown platforms were cleared in preparation for construction of the new station building. The new buildings were to be situated on the up side (towards Stratford) rather than on the road bridge over the line, and the platforms were to be linked by a footbridge. Estimates by Transport for London (TfL) show 352,000 entries and exits annually by 2031 with a service of two trains per hour. It was hoped that—after 29 years of closure—the station would reopen in late 2014. The construction date slipped, but work started in July 2015; the station reopened on the evening of Sunday 15 May 2016 with the full service beginning on Monday, 16 May 2016.

== Services ==
All services at Lea Bridge are operated by Greater Anglia using Class 720 EMUs.

The typical off-peak service in trains per hour is:

- 4 tph to Stratford
- 2 tph to Meridian Water
- 2 tph to Bishop's Stortford

During weekday peak hours, some services run to Hertford East instead of Bishop's Stortford. A limited number of through trains to or from London Liverpool Street operate in the early morning; one from there through to Herford East on weekdays and one to Cambridge North and a second to Bishop's Stortford on Saturdays. One southbound train to Liverpool Street runs on Saturdays in the opposite direction.

On Sundays, the services to Bishops Stortford run to Hertford East instead.

Preceding station	National Rail	Following station
Stratford	Greater Anglia West Anglia Main Line	Tottenham Hale
	Disused railways	
Stratford	Great Eastern Railway Palace Gates line	South Tottenham
Stratford	Great Eastern Railway Hall Farm Curve	St James Street
	Future development	
Stratford	Stansted Express Stansted Express	Tottenham Hale

== Connections ==
London Buses routes that serve the station are 55 and 56 and night routes N38 and N55.
