= Lea Valley lines =

Commuter railway lines in London, England

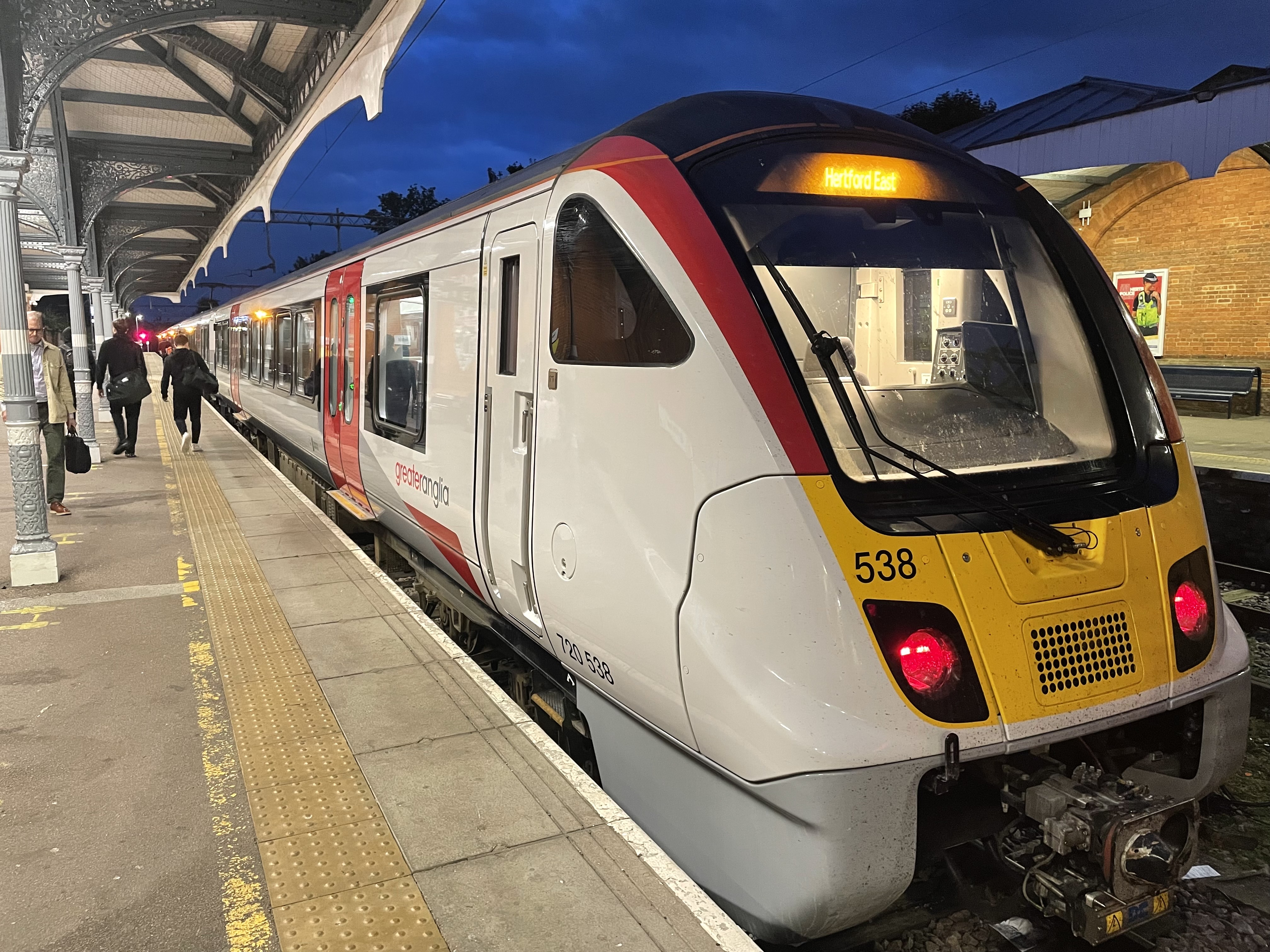
- Greater Anglia Class 720 at Hertford East

Overview
- Status: Operational
- Owner: Network Rail (Anglia Route)
- Locale: Greater London; East of England
- Termini: Enfield Town; Cheshunt; Chingford; Hertford East; London Liverpool Street Stratford
- Stations: 39

Service
- Type: Commuter rail, Suburban rail
- System: National Rail
- Services: 5
- Operators: Greater Anglia; London Overground
- Depot: Ilford
- Rolling stock: Class 710 "Aventra"; Class 745 "FLIRT"; Class 720 "Aventra"

Technical
- Number of tracks: 2–4
- Track gauge: 1,435 mm (4 ft 8 1/2 in) standard gauge
- Electrification: 25 kV 50 Hz AC Overhead lines
- Operating speed: 40–50 mph (64–80 km/h)
Route map
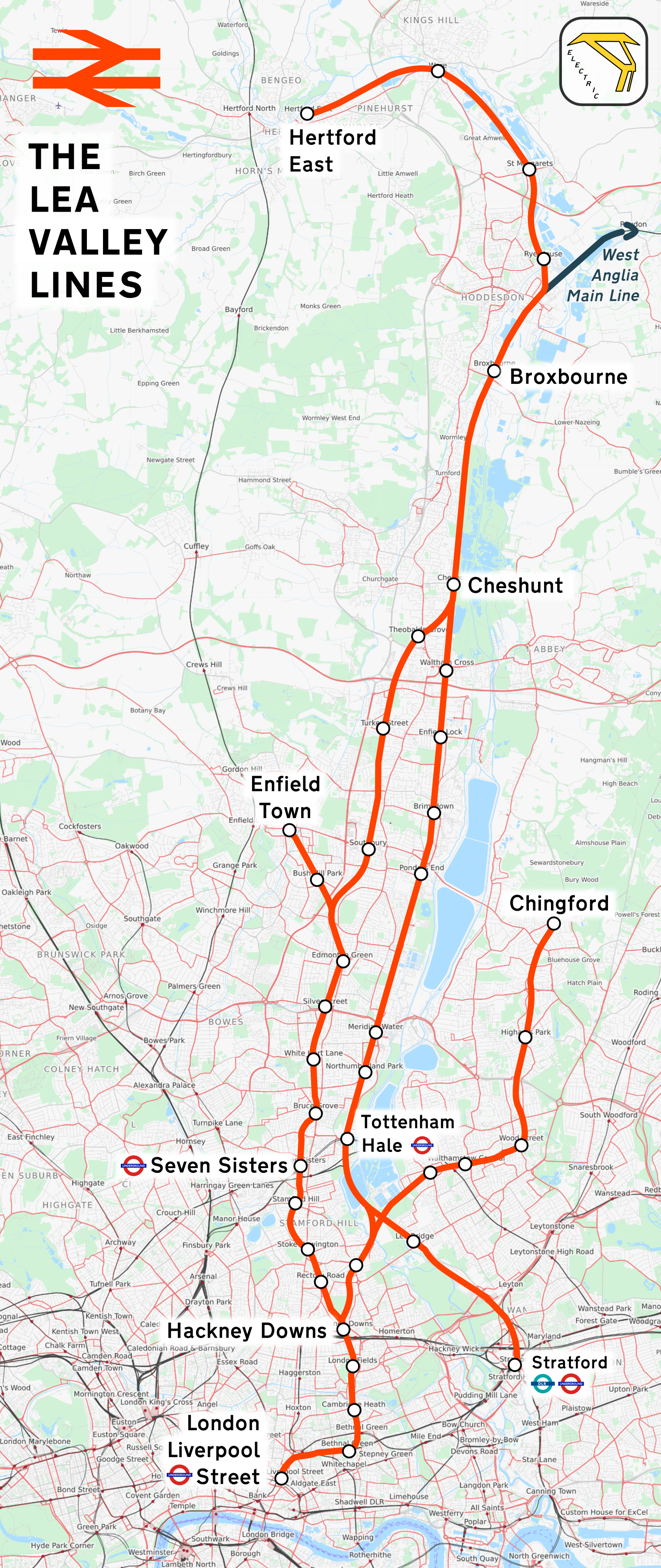
(Click to expand)

The Lea Valley lines are a set of suburban rail lines running along the Lea Valley in Greater London and Hertfordshire to Liverpool Street and Stratford. Historically part of the Great Eastern Railway, the lines now form part of the Anglia Route of Network Rail. Services are operated by London Overground's Weaver Line and Greater Anglia.

The lines include the Enfield Town branch, the Chingford branch, the Hertford East branch, the Southbury Loop, the Temple Mills branch, and the section of the West Anglia Main Line from Broxbourne towards London Liverpool Street and Stratford.

On 31 May 2015, services from London Liverpool Street to Chingford, Cheshunt and Enfield Town were transferred to London Overground; services from London Liverpool Street and Stratford via Tottenham Hale remain with Greater Anglia. Services operated by London Overground are now fully operated by new-built Class 710 rolling stock, replacing older Class 315 and Class 317 stock inherited from Greater Anglia. Services operated by Greater Anglia are operated by new Class 720 and Class 745 stock, replacing Class 317 and Class 379 trains.

In February 2024, London Mayor Sadiq Khan announced that Lea Valley line services operated by London Overground would be branded as the Weaver line in honour of the weaving industry that was once a major employer in the East End districts closest to the lines' Liverpool Street terminus.

== History ==
The first section was opened by the Eastern Counties Railway (ECR) on 20 June 1839 from the London end at Devonshire Street to Romford, extended on 1 July 1840 to Bishopsgate (London end) and Brentwood. The Northern and Eastern Railway (N&ER) opened its first section from that line at Stratford to Broxbourne on 15 September 1840, and to Harlow in 1841; though it remained a separate entity, its line was leased to the ECR from 1 January 1844. A branch from Broxbourne to Hertford opened in 1843.

Enfield was reached on 1 March 1849 by the single-track Enfield Town branch from the N&ER at Angel Road via Lower Edmonton. The ECR was incorporated into the Great Eastern Railway (GER) in 1862. A shorter route to Edmonton was provided by the GER in 1872, from Bethnal Green via Hackney Downs and Stoke Newington, which opened on 27 May; the section via Seven Sisters and Lower Edmonton, at a new high-level station provided adjacent to the old low-level station, opened on 22 July. The line from there to Enfield was doubled at the same time. The old line between Angel Road and Lower Edmonton was closed to passenger trains in 1939, except for occasional diversionary traffic including the period in the 1950s when the rest of the local network was being electrified under the Eastern Region; the line closed completely in 1964 and the track was removed soon after.

Another branch, the Chingford branch line, went from Lea Bridge to Walthamstow, Shern Hall Street, in 1870, extended southwards to Hackney Downs in 1872 and northwards to Chingford in 1873.

The final section linked Lower Edmonton on the Enfield branch via Churchbury (later Southbury) with the Broxbourne line at Cheshunt, opening on 1 October 1891; it was known as the Churchbury loop until the renaming of that station in 1960, then the Southbury loop.

A station was proposed near Clapton called Queens Road but never opened.

Electrification of the lines via Seven Sisters to Hertford East, Enfield Town and Bishops Stortford, plus the Chingford branch, were completed in 1960, initially at 6250 V 50 Hz and converted to 25 kV 50 Hz from 1976–1988 (details at Great Eastern Main Line § Electrification). The line via Tottenham Hale was not electrified until 1969, using Class 125 diesel multiple units between 1958 and 1969.

=== Naming of London Overground service ===
In 2021, Sadiq Khan announced that if re-elected as Mayor of London, he would give the six services operated by London Overground unique names that would reflect London's diversity, working with his Commission for Diversity in the Public Realm. This included services between Liverpool Street and Enfield Town, Cheshunt, and Chingford, which were transferred from Greater Anglia to London Overground in 2015.

The name proposed for this service in 2015 was the 'Lea Valley line', the established name used for the lines on which this service operates. On 25 August 2023, TFL announced that it would be giving each of the six Overground services unique names by the end of the following year. On 15 February 2024, it was confirmed that the Lea Valley section would be named the 'Weaver line' and would be coloured maroon on the updated network map.

The weaving and textile industry (colloquially "the rag trade") was a major employer in the East End districts (such as Shoreditch, Spitalfields, Haggerston, Hackney and Bethnal Green) close to the Liverpool Street terminus. Walthamstow, an area on the lines' Chingford branch, was home to the prominent textile artist William Morris.

The importance of the industry was such that two elements of the coat of arms of the London Borough of Tower Hamlets – the mulberry and the shuttle – are symbols of the industry.

There had been a local textile industry for time immemorial, but the arrival of Huguenot refugees bringing knowledge of advanced French techniques gave the industry a significant boost. The English word 'refugee', a loanword adopted from French, has its origin in the French word the Huguenots used to describe themselves.

Over the years much of the industry’s workforce would be made up of further waves of migrants from overseas including Ireland, Bangladesh and Jewish refugees from the Russian Empire.

== Route and services ==
All express and inter-city services utilising the lines, such as those towards Stansted Airport and Cambridge, are operated by Greater Anglia as part of the Greater Anglia franchise.

Suburban services are operated by both London Overground and Greater Anglia. Services operating on the Southbury Loop terminating at Cheshunt, on the Enfield Town branch, and on the Chingford branch are operated by London Overground. All services via Tottenham Hale, services originating at Stratford, and services operating via the Southbury Loop that continue beyond Cheshunt, are operated by Greater Anglia. The routes are:

- Southbury Loop (or Cheshunt Branch): London Liverpool Street – Cheshunt via Seven Sisters, Edmonton Green and Turkey Street, along the West Anglia Main Line to Hackney Downs Junction, rejoining it at Cheshunt Junction.
- Chingford Branch: London Liverpool Street – Chingford via Walthamstow Central, Wood Street and Highams Park, along the West Anglia Main Line to Clapton Junction.
- Enfield Town Branch: London Liverpool Street – Enfield Town via Seven Sisters, Edmonton Green and Bush Hill Park, along the West Anglia Main Line to Hackney Downs and the Southbury Loop to Edmonton Green and Edmonton Green Junction.
- Hertford East Branch: London Liverpool Street – Hertford East via Tottenham Hale, Broxbourne and Ware, along the West Anglia Main Line to Broxbourne and Rye House Junction, then the Hertford East branch line.
- Temple Mills Branch: Stratford – Tottenham Hale via Lea Bridge railway station, diverging from the Great Eastern Main Line and the North London Line at Temple Mills East Junction, joining the West Anglia Main Line at Coppermill Junction.

Until 1968 the Hall Farm Curve allowed trains from Stratford to Chingford. It may be reconstructed.

The lines were historically part of the Network Rail Strategic Route 5, SRS 05.02, 05.04 and part of 05.01. This was classified as a London and South East Commuter line.

A number of services to/from Liverpool Street/Enfield Town start or terminate in different places on special occasions. When Tottenham Hotspur F.C. are playing at home, additional trains run, some starting/terminating from White Hart Lane or Seven Sisters.

The lines are double track for most of its length, however between Hackney Downs and Liverpool Street it is multitrack – the suburban lines for trains stopping at Bethnal Green, Cambridge Heath and London Fields and the Main Lines for non-stop West Anglia/Stansted Express services. It is electrified at 25 kV AC using overhead line equipment and has a line speed of 40–75 mph (64–121 km/h) except between Cheshunt and Coppermill junction where it is 60–85 mph (97–137 km/h). Different sections have different loading gauges. Most is W8, with the branches to Enfield Town and Chingford being W6 and the branch to Stratford W9.

== List of stations ==
- London Liverpool Street
- Bethnal Green
- Cambridge Heath
- London Fields
- Hackney Downs
- Clapton
- St. James Street
- Walthamstow Central
- Wood Street
- Highams Park
- Chingford
- Stratford
- Lea Bridge
- Tottenham Hale
- Northumberland Park
- Meridian Water
- Ponders End
- Brimsdown
- Enfield Lock
- Waltham Cross
- Cheshunt
- Broxbourne
- Rye House
- St Margaret's
- Ware
- Hertford East
- Rectory Road
- Stoke Newington
- Stamford Hill
- Seven Sisters
- Bruce Grove
- White Hart Lane
- Silver Street
- Edmonton Green
- Bush Hill Park
- Enfield Town
- Southbury
- Turkey Street
- Theobalds Grove

== Future developments ==
The Tottenham Hale–West Anglian route was planned to become part of Crossrail 2 to Cheshunt, Broxbourne and Hertford East. In 2020 plans for Crossrail 2 were put on hold.
