= Theobalds Grove railway station =

London Overground station

Theobalds Grove
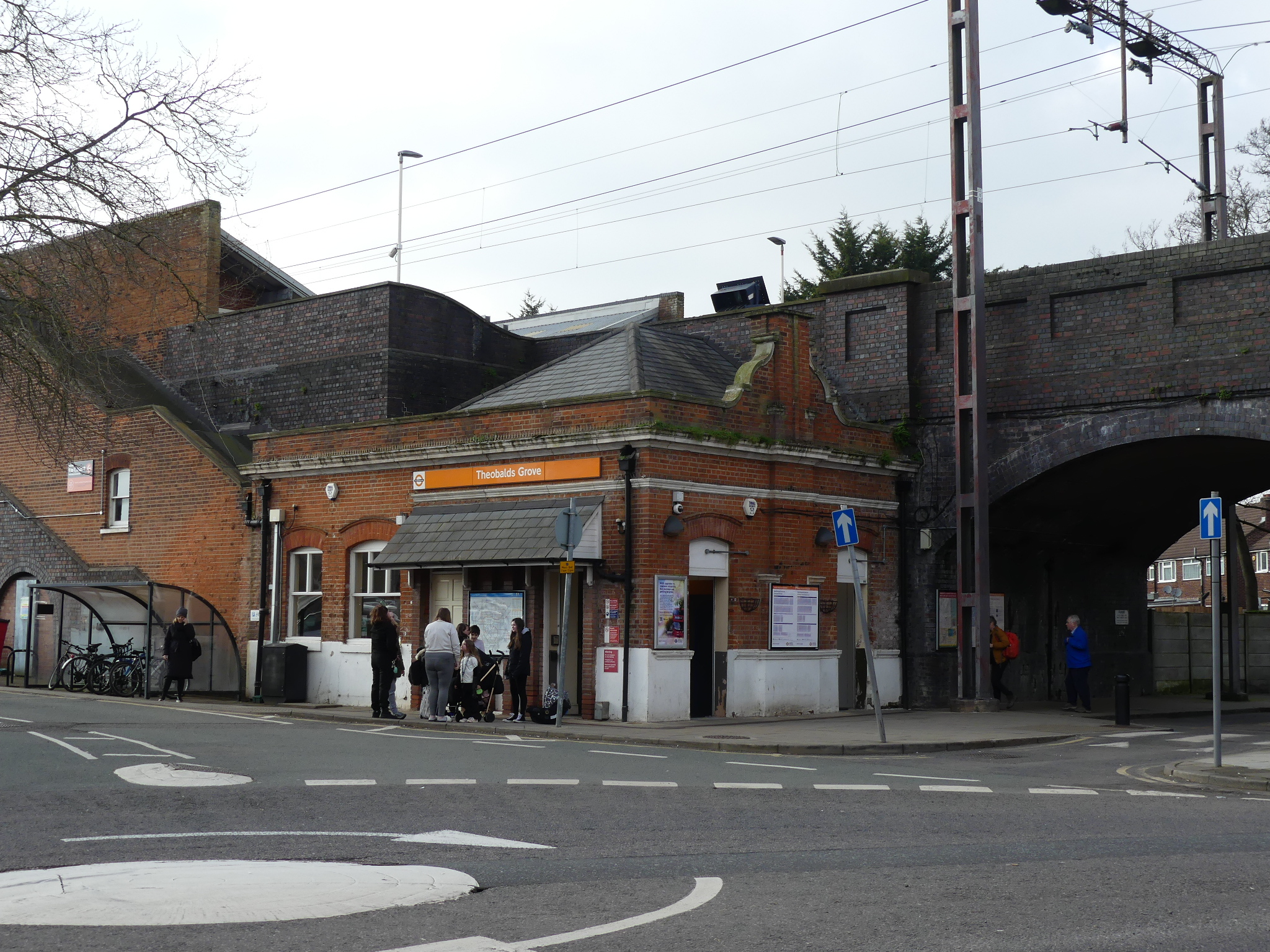
- The station entrance in March 2024
- Interactive map of Theobalds Grove

General information
- Location: Waltham Cross
- Local authority: Borough of Broxbourne
- Grid reference: TL358010
- Managed by: London Overground
- Owner: Network Rail
- Station code: TEO
- DfT category: D
- Number of platforms: 2
- Fare zone: 7

National Rail annual entry and exit
- 2020–21: ▼0.218 million
- 2021–22: ▲0.480 million
- 2022–23: ▲0.567 million
- 2023–24: ▲0.756 million
- 2024–25: ▼0.751 million

Railway companies
- Original company: Great Eastern Railway
- Pre-grouping: Great Eastern Railway
- Post-grouping: London and North Eastern Railway

Key dates
- 1 October 1891: Opened
- 1 October 1909: Closed
- 1 March 1915: Re-opened
- 1 July 1919: Closed
- 21 November 1960: Re-opened

Other information
- External links: Departures; Facilities
- Coordinates: 51.692°N 0.035°W

Theobalds Grove is a station on the Weaver line of the London Overground, located in Waltham Cross, Hertfordshire. The station is named after the nearby Theobalds Palace grounds. It is 13 miles 45 chains (21.8 km) down the line from London Liverpool Street and is situated between Turkey Street and Cheshunt stations on the Southbury Loop section of the Lea Valley lines. It is in London fare zone 7.

== History ==
The railway line from Bury Street Junction, north of the current Edmonton Green station, to Cheshunt was opened by the Great Eastern Railway on 1 October 1891. It was known as the Churchbury Loop.

The district served by the line was still predominantly rural, and the coming of the tram to Waltham Cross in 1904 saw the railway unable to compete. Passenger services ceased on 1 October 1909, but were reinstated for the benefit of munitions workers between 1 March 1915 and 1 July 1919.

After that the line was only served by freight trains until the line was electrified as part of a wider scheme, and Theobalds Grove station reopened to passengers on 21 November 1960. The line is now known as the Southbury Loop.

The goods depot at the station closed in 1967. Its site is now the station car park .

The station was much changed in the early 1980s along with several other stations on the line. The roofs on both platforms were removed and modern shorter replacements were installed (similar structures were built at Seven Sisters Station at the same time). Steel stairs replaced the wooden stairs leading up to the north-bound platforms though the wooden cover was retained. The London-bound staircase was left unaltered. The ticket office was also partially reconstructed.

From 2 January 2013, Oyster cards have been accepted at the station. The station is in London fare zone 7.

On 31 May 2015 the station and all services that call here transferred from Abellio Greater Anglia to London Overground Rail Operations.

== Services ==
All services at Theobalds Grove are operated as part of the Weaver line of the London Overground using Class 710 EMUs.

The typical off-peak service in trains per hour is:

- 2 tph to London Liverpool Street
- 2 tph to Cheshunt

Preceding station	London Overground	Following station
Turkey Street towards Liverpool Street	Weaver line Lea Valley lines	Cheshunt Terminus
