= Chingford branch line =

Railway line in London, England

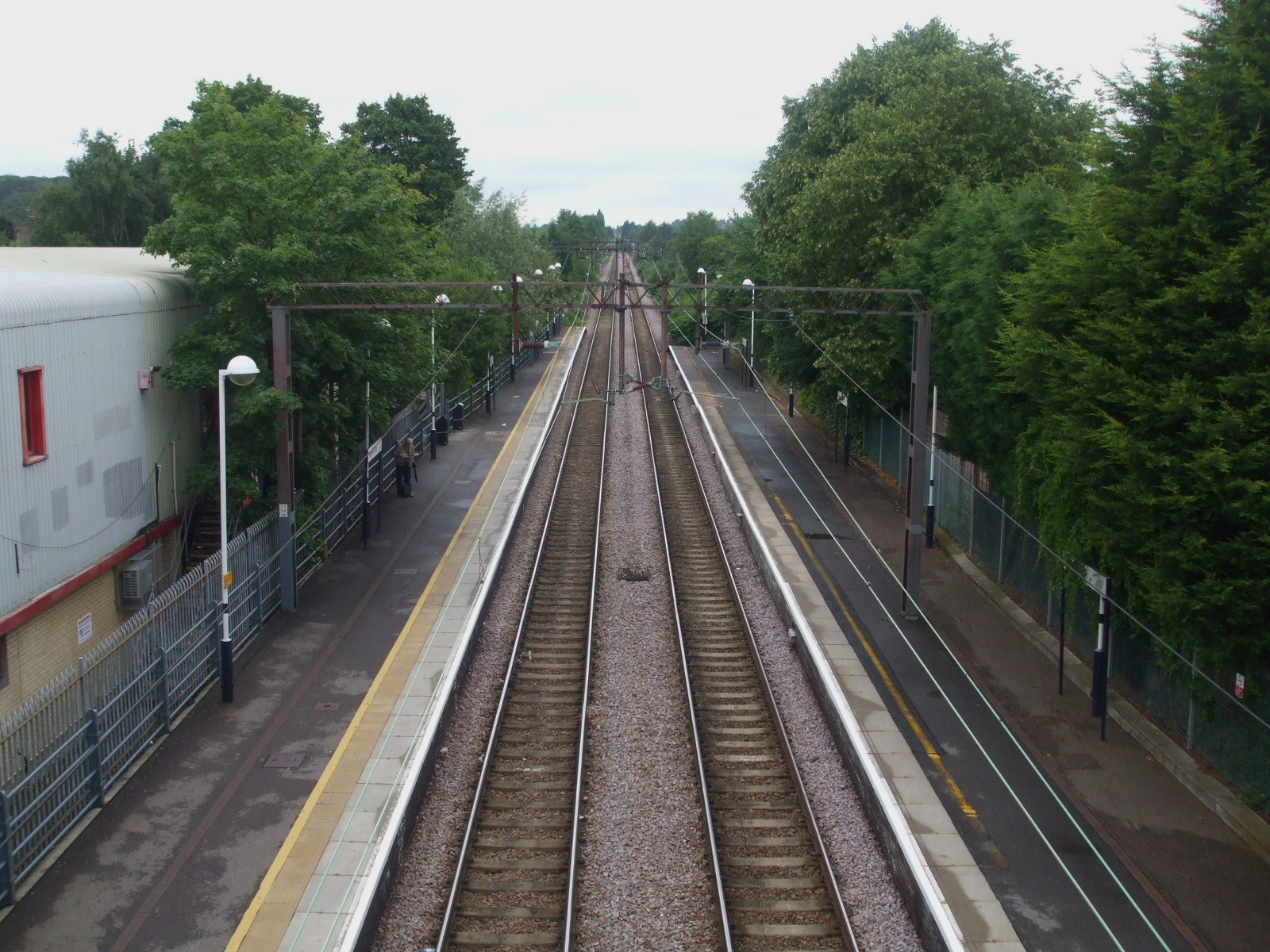
- Highams Park station, looking north towards Chingford

Overview
- Status: Operational
- Owner: Network Rail (Anglia Route)
- Locale: Greater London
- Termini: Chingford; Clapton Junction (connects to WAML)
- Stations: 5

Service
- Type: Suburban rail
- System: National Rail
- Services: 1
- Operator: London Overground
- Depot(s): Ilford; Sidings at Chingford
- Rolling stock: Class 710 "Aventra"

Technical
- Number of tracks: 2
- Track gauge: 4 ft 8 1/2 in (1,435 mm) standard gauge
- Electrification: 25 kV 50 Hz AC Overhead lines
- Operating speed: Below 75 mph (121 km/h)
Route map
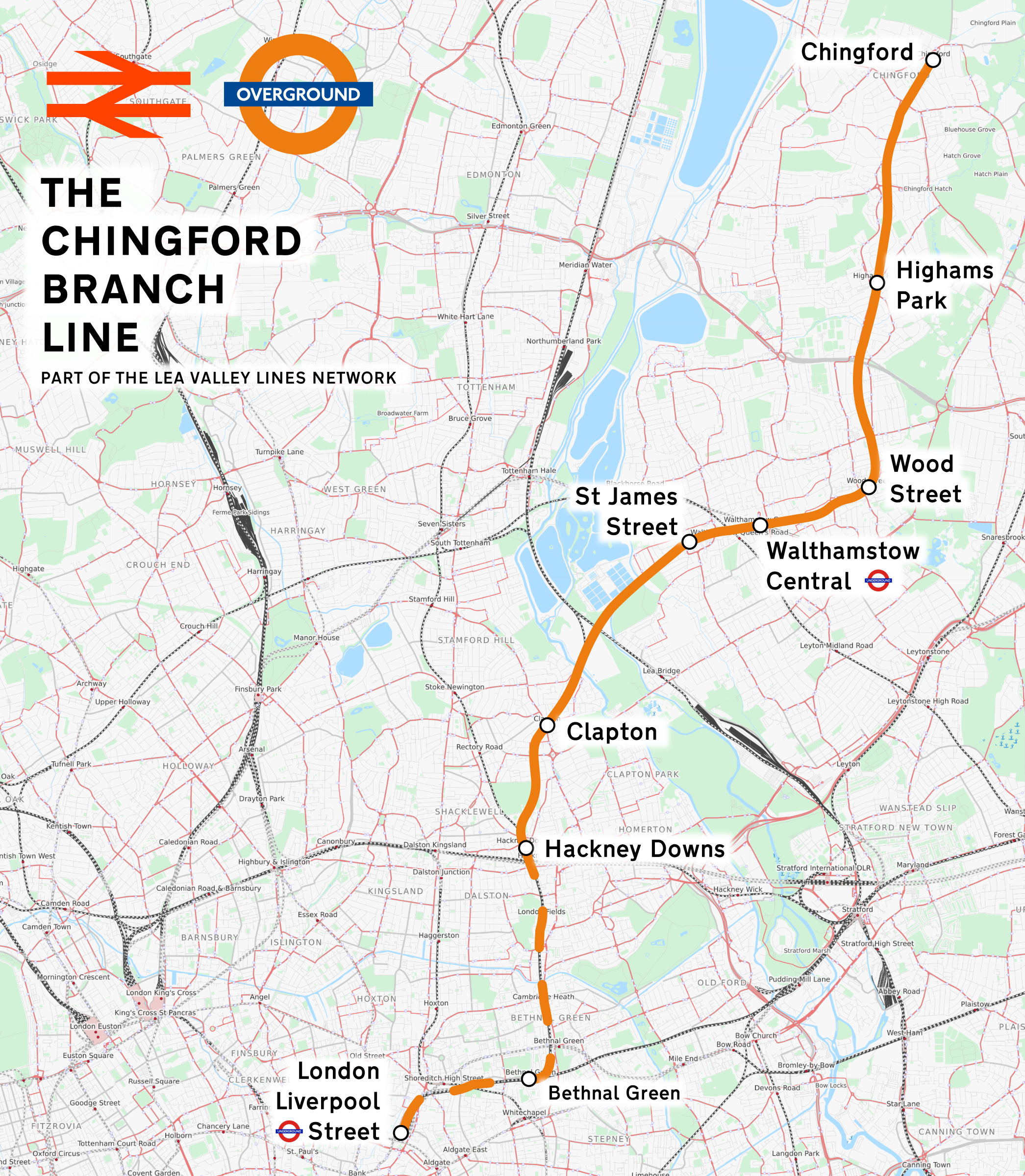
(Click to expand)

The Chingford branch line is a railway line between Clapton Junction (just northeast of Clapton station) and Chingford station. Services run between Liverpool Street station and Chingford, and are operated by London Overground. (Note: See West Anglia Main Line for more information about the section from Liverpool Street to Clapton Junction.) The branch is part of the Lea Valley Lines.

== Construction and opening ==
By the middle of the 19th century, Walthamstow had a population of 5,000 people and was a rural retreat for London businessmen. The nearest railway station was at Lea Bridge and a horse-drawn omnibus service ran from Walthamstow to meet the train services. The 1860s saw the beginnings of suburban development in the area encouraged by a number of developers hoping to attract the middle classes to the area. The Great Eastern Railway (GER) was promoting a scheme in 1864 but this found little favour with one developer James Higham who promoted a competing scheme which would have run from a junction just north of Stratford station. However, by 1867 the GER was in financial difficulties and although construction work had started on the branch it had ceased by 1868. Housing construction was continuing apace and Higham approached the GER board with money to build the line. Time was running out on the Great Eastern Railway (Highbeech Branch) Act 1864 (27 & 28 Vict. c. xcv) but Parliament extended this and instructed the GER it should build a branch from its main line between Stratford and Tottenham Hale to Walthamstow.

The GER managed to raise funds and a single-line branch was built from just north of Lea Bridge station to a temporary station at Shern Hall Street with intermediate stations at St James Street and Hoe Street.

== Operation ==
=== Great Eastern Railway (1870–1922) ===
In 1870, a line was opened from Lea Bridge Road to Shern Hall Street station (a temporary station located west of the present day Wood Street station) and a shuttle service operated commencing traffic on 24 April 1870. The train service was not operated as a through service and passengers had to change for trains to Bishopsgate station (this was the destination before Liverpool Street opened).

The line between Hackney Downs and Church Hall Junction opened on 1 August 1872 and direct services to Bishopsgate commenced as a result. In 1873 the line was extended to a temporary terminus at Chingford (where the engines refilled their tanks from a farm pond). This extension saw the closure of Shern Hall station and the opening of Wood Street and Hale End (since renamed Highams Park).

The permanent terminus at Chingford opened on 2 September 1878. It had been planned to extend the line to High Beach and indeed a bill was deposited before Parliament in 1882. However Queen Victoria visited Chingford on 6 May 1882 to declare Epping Forest open to the public and opponents of the extension used the possible desecration of the forest as an effective way of stopping the extension in its tracks.

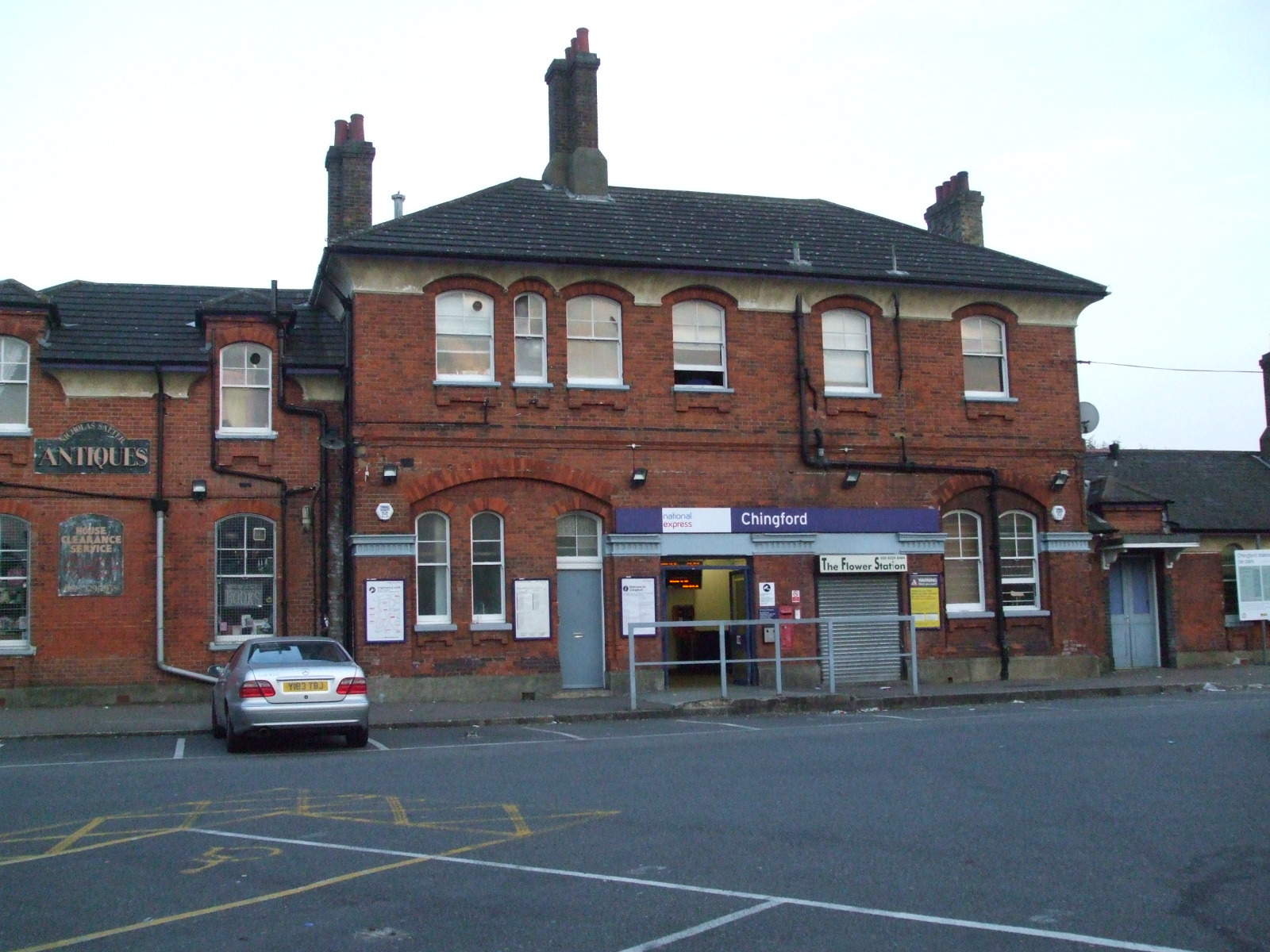
Chingford station building

In 1885 a curve from Coppermill Junction to Hall Farm Junction gave access from the branch to the West Anglia Main Line. As well as goods traffic this saw match day specials from c1930 for Tottenham Hotspur home games at White Hart Lane. The late part of the 19th century saw significant housing development in the Walthamstow area although Chingford remained largely rural with pleasure traffic being its major source of revenue.

In 1894 Hale End was renamed Highams Park (Hale End) on 1 October 1894 and it was around this time that terraced housing started appearing south and west of the station. The arrival of the British Xylonite Company in 1894 saw traffic to and from the goods yard increase (Xylonite is an early form of plastic)

In the 1910s it became apparent that severe overcrowding was causing problems and the branch was identified for a series of improvements to enable more services to run. After World War One four new carriage sidings were laid and a new signal box opened at Chingford, carriage sidings and the engine shed facilities at Wood Street were expanded.

On 13 February 1919 there was an accident at Wood Street when a passenger train ran into an empty stock train. Five people were injured – none seriously. The cause was a signal failure.

The new improved passenger services (marketed as the Jazz service) started on 12 July 1920.

=== London & North Eastern Railway (1923–1947) ===
Although not as susceptible as some suburban lines to competing road and tram transport the Chingford branch saw a decline in passenger traffic in the 1920s. This is partly as industrial developments northwards along the Lea Valley saw employment patterns changing although through the 1920s continuing house building along the route offset this. By 1928 all services were in the hands of the N7 0-6-2T locomotives and LNER Quint Art sets replaced the older GER four wheelers (by 1931).

In the mid 1930s the line was resignalled with colour light signaling and this came into use on 30 January 1938. The branch was controlled by signal boxes at Clapton Junction and Chingford intermediate signal boxes closed on this date (although the structures still contained equipment)

=== British Railways (1948–1994) ===
Following nationalisation responsibility for operating the station fell to British Railways (Eastern Region).

The 1955 Modernisation Plan saw the Chingford line as one of several in north-east London identified for electrification - the others being the Enfield Town Line and the Southbury loop as far as Broxbourne. Before this the local MP had described the train service as being run "by the most decrepit engines and the most ramshackle rolling stock imaginable". Additionally British Railways were having problems retaining staff who were attracted to better paid industrial jobs, so it was clear that to maintain train services that something needed to change.

The Chingford line was electrified (to 6.25 kV AC) in the late 1950s, with electric services commencing on 12 November 1960. The section from Stratford to Lea Bridge and thence via the Hall Farm curve was also included in this scheme giving a second route to Chingford (the Liverpool Street to Shenfield line had already been electrified by this point) however the work was started but never completed.

Early electric services were formed of Class 305 EMUs but initial technical problems with these saw replacements by Class 302 and Class 304 EMUs.

In 1960, the Coppermill Curve was lifted.

Steam was occasionally seen on passenger services until the end of 1961 and continued on freight services well into 1962.

In 1967, the Hall Farm Curve from Lea Bridge to Hall Farm Junction (near St James Street) was closed to regular traffic although it is possible occasional goods trains ran until the goods yard at Wood Street closed in 1968. Despite being electrified in 1960 it is believed that no electric services ever used the chord. The curve was used in steam days to exchange locomotives between Stratford engine shed and the branch. Hoe Street station was renamed Walthamstow Central station and became an interchange station and the eastern terminus of the Victoria line with London Underground services starting on 1 September 1968. This saw passengers from Chingford and Highams Park changing at Walthamstow for the West End and releasing passenger capacity for the remaining stations in to Liverpool Street.

On 20 November 1983, the electric supply was upgraded to 25 kV AC.

When sectorisation was introduced in the 1980s, the station was served by Network SouthEast until the privatisation of British Rail.

=== Privatisation era (1994–present day) ===
London Overground network

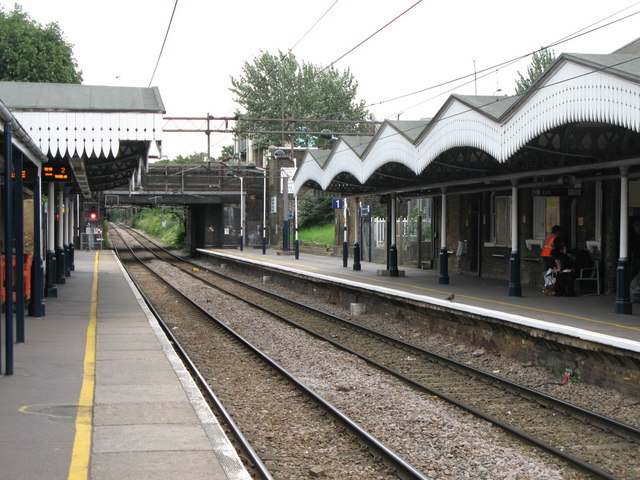
Walthamstow Central station with original GER style platform awnings

The Railways Act 1993 saw the railway split into two parts with Railtrack being responsible for the maintenance of the infrastructure and a series of different companies operating the services.

However, before the franchises were let operation was in the hands of independent business units.

The first of the private sector operators was the West Anglia Great Northern (WAGN) Railway which operated suburban services on the West Anglia Main Line and associated branches. It also operated the suburban services out of Kings Cross and Moorgate stations and its rolling stock was maintained at Hornsey and Ilford depots. It commenced operation in January 1997.

On 3 October 2002 Railtrack was bought by Network Rail who became responsible for the infrastructure on the branch.

WAGN operated the Chingford branch from January 1997 until 2004 when the Strategic Rail Authority made changes to the franchise arrangements and the line became part of the Greater Anglia franchise which covered the whole of East Anglia. The new franchise was named the "one" franchise by successful bidder National Express.

The "one" franchise was renamed National Express East Anglia in February 2008, and continued operation of the branch until 2012. Operation then passed to the Abellio Greater Anglia franchise.

On 31 May 2015, the line became part of the London Overground network: a concession controlled by Transport for London and currently operated by Arriva Rail London.

In June 2023, TFL announced that it would be giving each of the six Overground services unique names by the end of the following year. On 15 February 2024, it was confirmed that the Lea Valley section would be named the Weaver line (to honour the weaving and textile industry in several locations the line serves) and would be coloured maroon on the updated network map.

== Passenger services ==
In 1870 the service operated between Lea Bridge and a temporary service at Shern Hall street station (near Wood Street).

From 1872 services from the branch then operated to Bishopsgate station calling at Clapton and Hackney Downs. The following year trains were extended to Chingford. Between November 1872 and January 1874 trains terminated at the newly constructed Bishopsgate (Low Level) and then to Liverpool Street when that station opened.

The opening of the spur from Hall Farm Junction to Coppermill Junction in 1885 saw the introduction of a 12 trains per day service to Highgate Road (via South Tottenham) and from 1888 this was extended to Gospel Oak. Patronage was never great (although the route did well on public holidays) and by 1901 suffered from road and tram competition. By the end of 1918 there were only two trains per day (although this reduction may have been a wartime economy measure). This service lasted until 5 September 1926 after which trains only operated on bank holidays although these ended in August 1939.

In 1897 services running every half hour throughout the night started to operate between Wood Street and Liverpool Street. These lasted until 1966.

From 12 July 1920 a new improved train service was run (known as the Jazz service). Peak hour trains ran at five-minute intervals with one train originating/terminating at Wood Street and the other at Chingford. Peak hour trains consisted of 16 four wheel carriages with 848 seats whilst off peak trains were worked by 6 four wheelers (318) seats.

The July 1922 Bradshaw's Guide showed the Chingford line service on table 312.

During World War Two services generally ran every 10 minutes on the branch.

In the 1950s excursions were run from Chingford to destinations including Margate, Hastings and Brighton. the trains were routed into Liverpool Street and then via the former link onto the East London Line.

The electrified service which started on 18 June 1962 had trains running every 10 minutes with additional services during the hours. The basic pattern was soon revised to every 20 minutes as much business had by this point been lost to road traffic.

In the May 2015 timetable all services call at all stations on the branch plus Clapton, Hackney Downs and Liverpool Street. In the off peak all services call at Bethnal Green which is only served by some services in the peak hours. Trains run every 15 minutes typically taking 26 minutes from Liverpool Street.

== Goods traffic ==
Goods traffic on the Chingford branch generally emanated from Temple Mills Marshalling Yard and used the Hall Farm Curve to access the branch or from the sidings at Northumberland Park using the curve from the West Anglia Main Line to access the branch.

Wood Street, Hoe Street, Highams Park and Chingford all had goods yards. The later two stations dealt with traffic of a more rural nature for many years including milk.

By the 1950s, following the rise of road transport, freight traffic on the branch was largely coal, timber, general merchandise and building materials.

As well as coal for the engine shed at Wood Street there was a power station at Hoe Street which was rail served until December 1967.

The goods yards closed on the following dates:

- Hoe Street – November 1964
- Wood Street – 6 May 1968
- Highams Park – 4 October 1965
- Chingford – 4 October 1965

== Locomotives ==
Opened by the Great Eastern Railway, operation throughout the steam era was almost exclusively by locomotives built by the GER (or in the early days of operations its predecessors). Passenger operation was almost exclusively in the hands of tank engines with tender engines handling goods traffic.

Typical classes that operated the line were:

The 'No. 134 Class' 0-4-4T were built in 1872–1873 specifically at the time Liverpool street opened and more suburban services were being operated by the GER.. Construction of the thirty engines was divided equally between Neilson & Co. and the Avonside Engine Co. They were displaced from Chingford line duties c1900.

The GER Class M15 (LNER class F4/5) was a class of 160 2-4-2T steam locomotives designed by Thomas William Worsdell and built between 1884 and 1909.

The GER Class R24 was a class of 140 0-6-0 steam tank locomotives designed by James Holden later to become LNER Class J67. A later version of this class the Class S56 numbered 20 locomotives (LNER Class J69).

The GER Class L77 (LNER Class N7) 0-6-2T locomotives were designed by the GER (but most examples were actually built by its successor the London & North Eastern Railway. Designed by Alfred John Hill they were employed on suburban passenger services throughout the North East London area between 1915 and 1962. Initially locomotive numbers 7990–7999 9LNER numbering) were specifically allocated to Chingford branch line services.

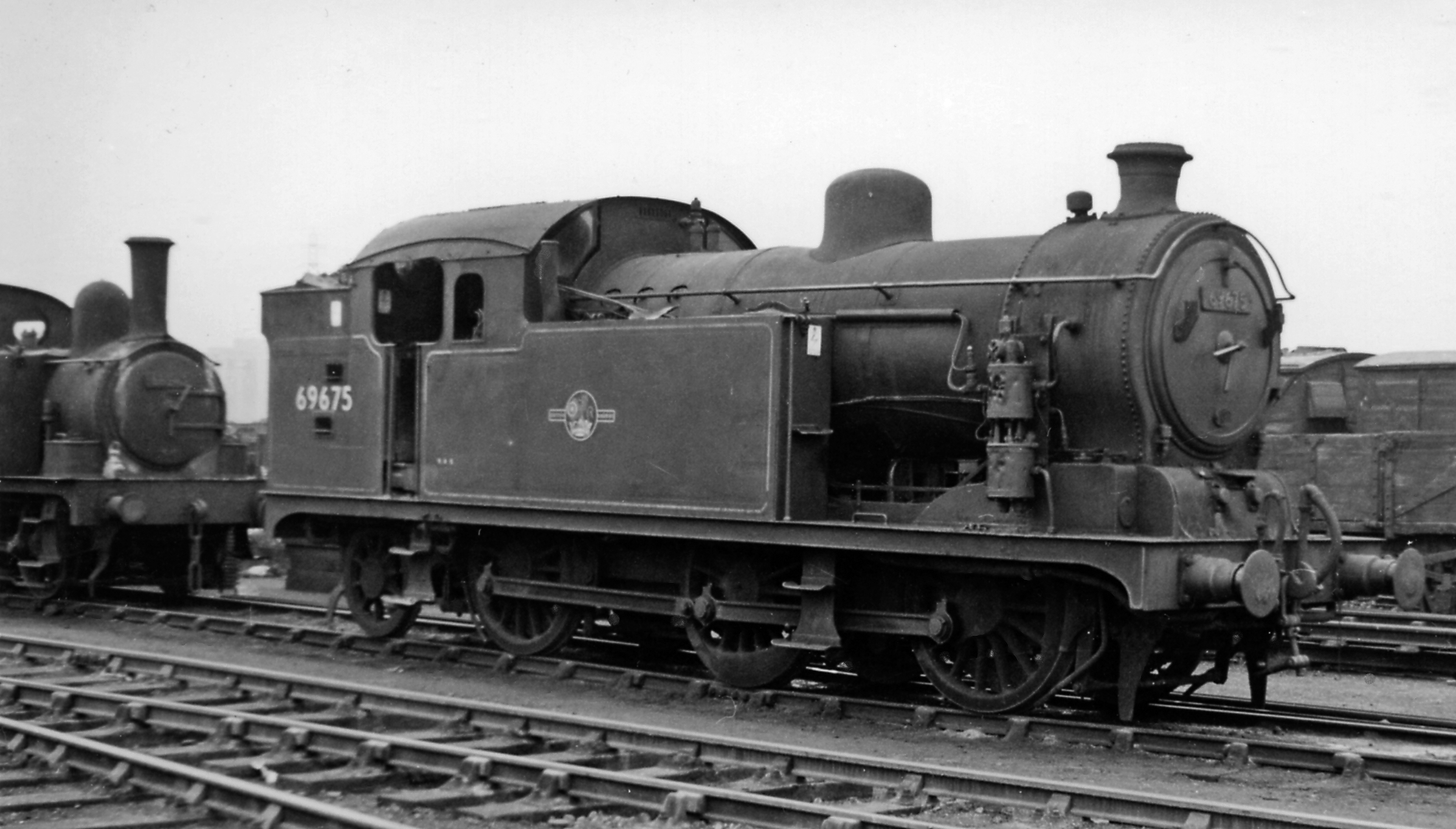
An N7 0-6-2T which was the mainstay of the passenger service for many years

Holden designed the GER Class S44 (LNER G4) 0-4-4T engines of 1898 with the Chingford and Enfield branches in mind. However increasing train weights by the 1920s saw them displaced to rural duties before withdrawal between 1929 and 1938.

The GER Class Y14 (LNER Class J15) 0-6-0 locomotives were employed on freight trains on the line. Designed by T.W. Worsdell for both freight and passenger duties they were introduced in July 1883 and they were so successful that new batches were built (largely unchanged) to 1913 the final total being 289.

Following the 1960 electrification various classes of Electric Multiple Unit (EMU) took over operation of the line (although initial technical problems saw steam still operating services for a short period). These trains were all allocated to Ilford depot situated on the Great Eastern main line.

EMU classes that operated the line included:

- British Rail Class 302
- British Rail Class 305
- British Rail Class 306
- British Rail Class 307
- British Rail Class 308

By the 1980s these units were being withdrawn and replaced by more modern stock. The branch was then generally worked by either British Rail Class 315 or British Rail Class 317 EMUs, which have now been replaced in turn by Class 710 Aventra EMUs

== Carriages ==
All coaching stock that operated the line was either built by the Great Eastern Railway (or its predecessors such as the Eastern Counties Railway) or London and North Eastern Railway.

From opening until the mid 1920s coaching stock was four wheeled and even as late as 1900 the majority of GER suburban trains were composed of four-wheeler carriages.

Interior design was spartan and around 1900 third-class passengers sat on bare boards five abreast, second-class passengers on cushions also five abreast, while first-class passengers sat four abreast and enjoyed more legroom. In 1899 James Holden produced the first six passengers sat abreast carriages in a 13-carriage, third-class only train (each carriage was 27 feet long and 9 feet wide and had five compartments). This set, which also included such modern features as slam lock doors and gas tail lamps became the model for future suburban carriage design.

The GER made every effort to maximise the capacity of its suburban carriages to deal with the rise in usage. In the early 1900s some four-wheeler carriages were cut in half longitudinally and a section inserted to make them wider in order to increase the capacity. By 1915 A. J. Hill instigated a policy of converting old four-wheel carriages into bogeyed stock and some 500 four-wheeled carriages were converted this way.

From 1928 LNER Quint-Art sets designed by Sir Nigel Gresley were being deployed on the branch. These were 5-car sets, and the articulated bogies effectively joined the carriages together rather than bogies. In the peak hours these operated as 10-car sets.

One unusual passenger working was the 1882 visit of the Great Western Railway royal train on 6 May 1882 for the visit of Queen Victoria. It was hauled by a GER 0-4-4T engine.

== Other facilities ==
An engine shed was located at Wood Street railway station and this was a sub-shed of Stratford engine shed. It had an allocation of tank engines for suburban use – largely class L77 (LNE Class N7) and was closed around the time of electrification. There were also carriage sidings located at Wood Street and at Chingford.

As of 2019, there are still sidings at Chingford used for the stabling of EMU sets.

== Future developments ==
Longer term the restoration of the Hall Farm Curve has been considered a number of times as it would significantly reduce journey times between the Chingford branch and Stratford.

At various times, stations have been suggested for Chingford Hatch and Forest Road, Walthamstow.

== See also ==
- Great Eastern Railway

== Bibliography ==
- Allen, Cecil J. (1955). The Great Eastern Railway (1st ed.). Shepperton: Ian Allan. OCLC 12240779.
- Jackson, Alan A. (1999). London's Local Railways (2nd ed.). Harrow Weald: Capital Transport Publishing.
- Jones, H.E. (July 1979). "Memories of the Chingford branch line". Great Eastern Railway Society Journal. 19: 12–13.
