= Clapton railway station =

London Overground station

Clapton
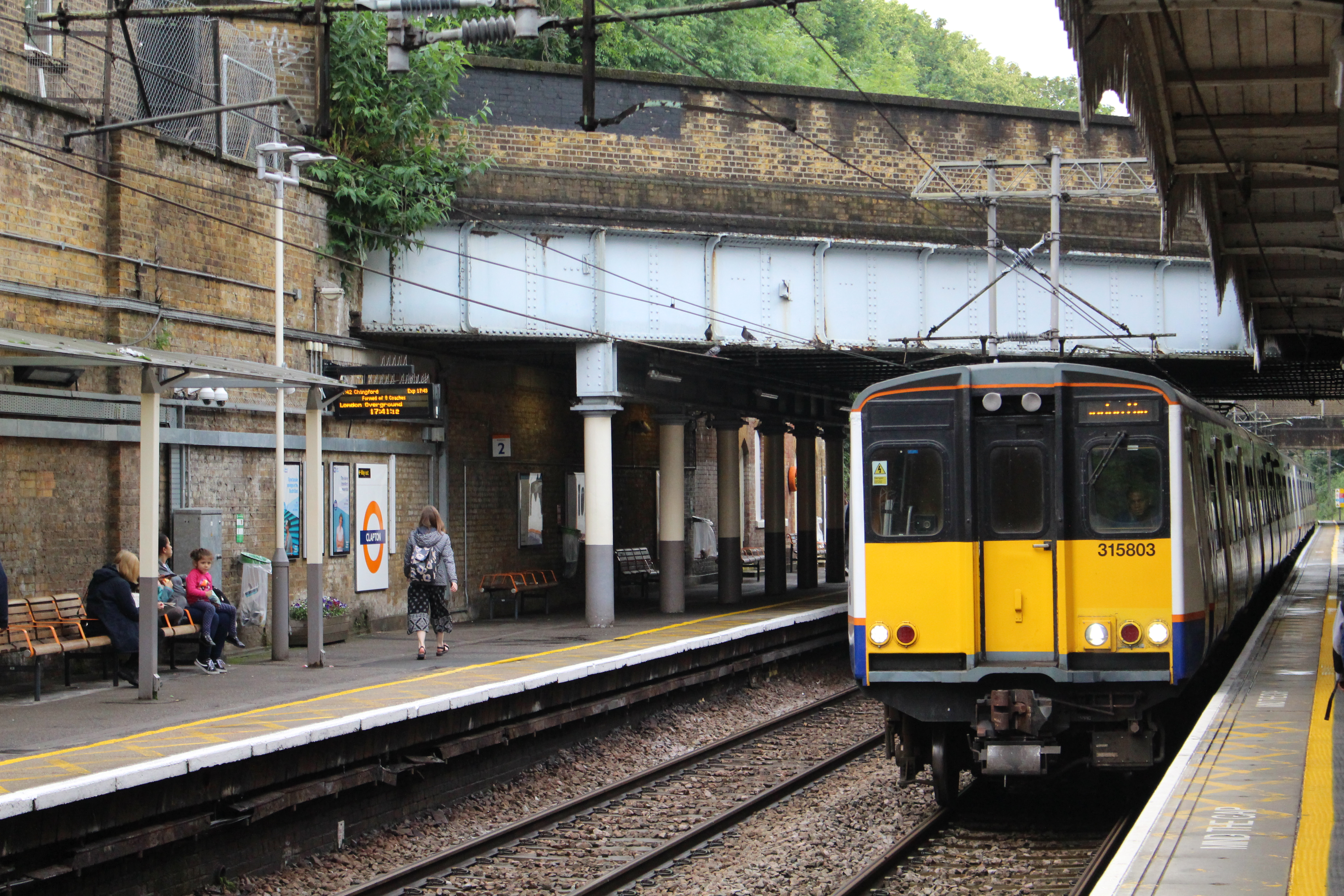
- A London Overground Class 315 at Clapton in June 2019
- Interactive map of Clapton

General information
- Location: Clapton
- Local authority: London Borough of Hackney
- Managed by: London Overground
- Station code: CPT
- DfT category: D
- Number of platforms: 2
- Fare zone: 2 and 3

National Rail annual entry and exit
- 2020–21: ▼0.571 million
- 2021–22: ▲1.282 million
- 2022–23: ▲1.690 million
- 2023–24: ▲2.196 million
- 2024–25: ▼2.130 million

Railway companies
- Original company: Great Eastern Railway
- Pre-grouping: Great Eastern Railway
- Post-grouping: London and North Eastern Railway; British Railways

Key dates
- 1 July 1872: Opened

Other information
- External links: Departures; Facilities
- Coordinates: 51.5617°N 0.0571°W

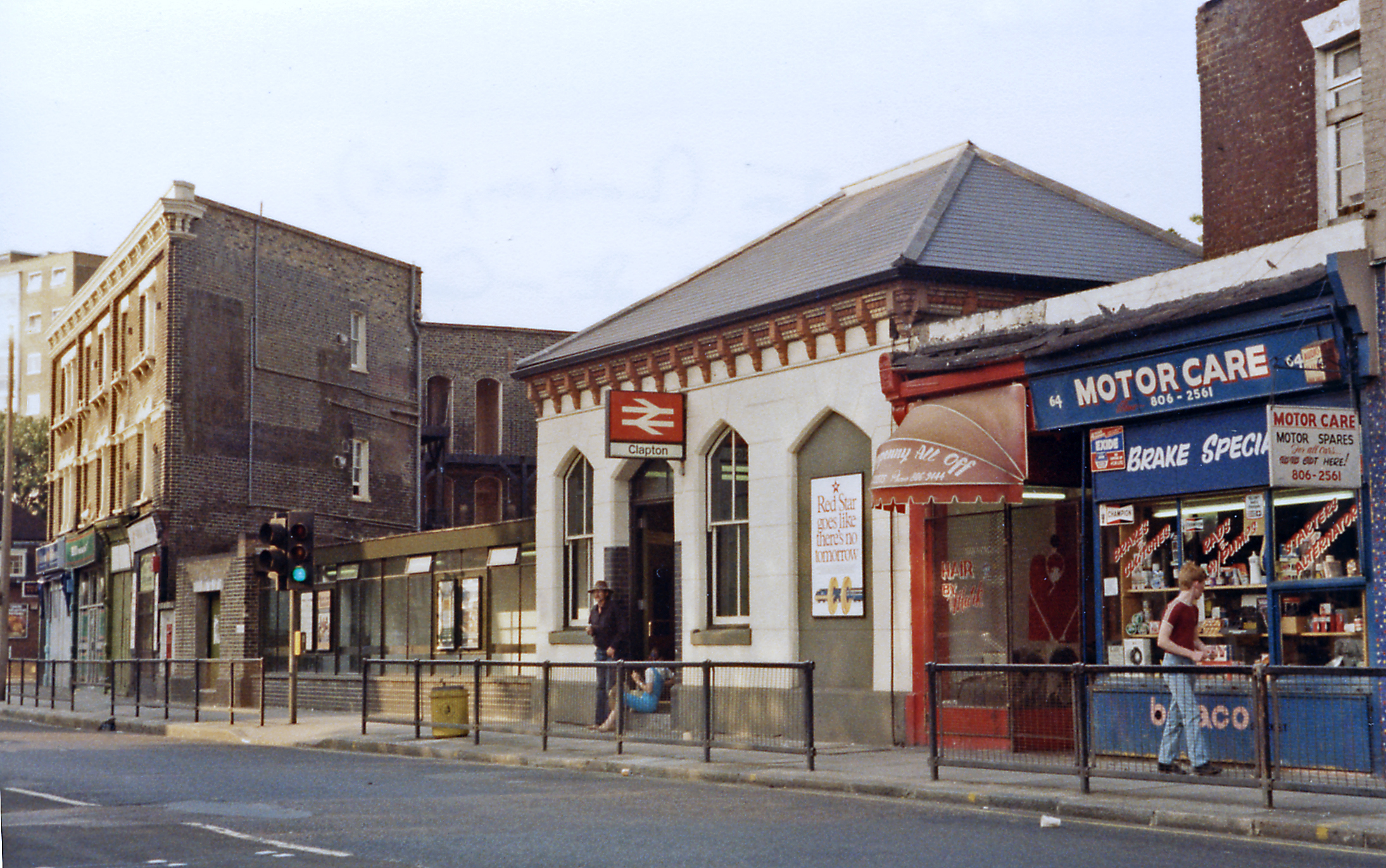
Station entrance in 1984

Clapton is a station on the Weaver line of the London Overground, located in Clapton in the London Borough of Hackney. It is 3 miles 78 chains (6.4 km) down the line from London Liverpool Street and is situated between Hackney Downs and St. James Street on the Chingford branch line. The station is in London fare zone 2 and 3. It opened to traffic in August 1872 along with the route from Hackney Downs.

National Rail services operated by Greater Anglia pass through the station, as it is located on the West Anglia Main Line between Hackney Downs and Tottenham Hale (via Coppermill Junction), which is used by trains towards Cheshunt, Broxbourne, Hertford East and Cambridge. However, none of these services are currently scheduled to stop here.

== Services ==
The typical off-peak weekday service on the Weaver line consists of:

- 4 trains per hour (tph) to London Liverpool Street;
- 4 tph to Chingford.

In years past, British Rail and the various operators running the Greater Anglia franchise had provided a service from here to Tottenham Hale, Broxbourne, and Hertford East but this ceased when the Chingford branch passed to London Overground in May 2015.

== Connections ==
London Buses routes 106, 253, 254 and 393 and night routes N253 serve the station.

Preceding station	London Overground	Following station
Hackney Downs towards Liverpool Street	Weaver line Weaver Lea Valley lines	St. James Street towards Chingford
