= Hall Farm Curve =

Coordinates: 51.5722°N 0.0462°W

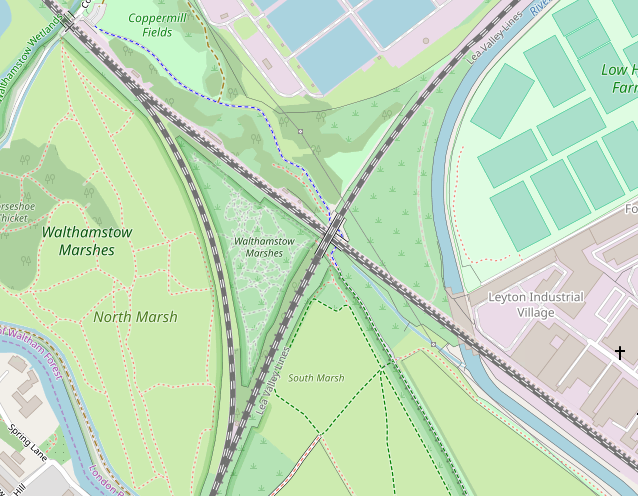
- Location of the former Hall Farm Curve, which linked the two tracks on the right of the map

Overview
- Status: Disused
- Owner: Network Rail
- Locale: Greater London
- Termini: Chingford; Stratford
- Stations: Lea Bridge

Service
- Type: Commuter rail, Suburban rail

History
- Opened: 26 April 1870
- Closed: 1968

Technical
- Number of tracks: 2
- Track gauge: 4 ft 8 1/2 in (1,435 mm) standard gauge

The Hall Farm Curve is a disused 500 m (1,600 ft) length of railway line in Walthamstow, East London, that connected Chingford station with Stratford station until the closure of the section of line in September 1968. The track was lifted in 1970.

== Route ==
Located between Hall Farm Junction and Lea Bridge Junction, the Hall Farm Curve connected two of the Lea Valley Lines – that running between Stratford and Tottenham Hale, and the Chingford branch line.

It was situated opposite the existing Clapton Curve, which connects Liverpool Street and Tottenham Hale. The Coppermill Curve connected Chingford and Tottenham Hale, the track was lifted in 1960.

Lea Bridge railway station is located a short distance to the south of the junction on the Stratford line. It was closed in 1985, but reopened in spring 2016.

== History ==
The curve was opened on 26 April 1870 as the original route from London to Walthamstow. When the direct line to Clapton opened in 1872, it was used by a regular service between Stratford and Chingford until 1940. Weekend services continued on the line until 1950. In 1960 the Chingford line was electrified, and overhead wires erected over the Hall Farm curve, but not the Stratford line. It was still used as a diversionary and freight route, using diesel haulage. However, British Rail closed the line in 1968 and removed the track from the curve in 1970.

== Possible reinstatement ==
Campaigns have been run since the 1990s to have both the curve and Lea Bridge station reinstated. Lea Bridge station re-opened in 2016. Legal powers to re-lay the spur were obtained by British Rail in 1992, but not exercised. The proposal has the support of Waltham Forest London Borough Council; Jennette Arnold, Labour Party politician and member of the London Assembly representing the London Boroughs of Hackney, Islington and Waltham Forest; Stella Creasy, Member of Parliament for Walthamstow; the Walthamstow Liberal Democrats, the Chingford and Woodford Green Liberal Democrats, the Chingford and Woodford Green Labour Party; and Railfuture, an independent organisation campaigning for better rail services in the UK. Transport for London (TfL) ran a study on the feasibility of reopening the curve for 2016 that produced a result with a benefit-cost ratio ranging between 8:1 and 14:1 depending on the length of trains involved. In 2007, the Greater Anglia Route Utilisation Strategy published by Network Rail suggested that construction of the curve could be possible by 2019 or later.

Designs for new services run using the curve have been suggested to reduce journey times between Chingford and Stratford to 20 minutes, and high-frequency journeys between Walthamstow Central and Stratford to 12 minutes from the current duration of about 35 minutes.

In January 2017 the Mayor of London, Sadiq Khan, responded to a petition for the reinstatement of the curve, stating that whilst TfL "supports the principle of improving connectivity between Waltham Forest and Stratford", it would not be possible due to expenses involved in purchasing non-railway land and constructing additional platforms at Stratford.

In January 2019, Campaign for Better Transport released a report identifying the line was listed as Priority 2 for reopening. Priority 2 is for those lines which require further development or a change in circumstances (such as housing developments). In 2023, the Greater London Authority announced it proposed to reopen the curve.
