= Little Russia, London =

Coordinates: 51.608°N 0.072°W

Little Russia
- Location within Greater London
- London borough: Haringey
- Ceremonial county: Greater London
- Region: London
- Country: England
- Sovereign state: United Kingdom
- Post town: LONDON
- Postcode district: N17
- Dialling code: 020
- Police: Metropolitan
- Fire: London
- Ambulance: London
- UK Parliament: Tottenham
- London Assembly: Enfield and Haringey

Little Russia was a nickname given to an area of Tottenham in north London in the early 20th century after Russian immigrants settled there. Located on the northern boundary of the modern London Borough of Haringey, it mainly comprised Pretoria Road, Durban Road, and Lorenco Road, west of the railway line between Silver Street railway station and White Hart Lane railway station.

Russian immigration to the neighbourhood peaked when a large number of Russians settled there after fleeing the 1917 Russian Revolution. It developed into a tough area which the local police usually only patrolled in pairs. The area was mostly redeveloped in the 1970s.

== Literature ==
In An Edmonton Boy, Terry Webb describes the area:

My mother came out of Tottenham, out of a road called Lorenco Road (now demolished). Now that had the nickname of "Little Russia" – why it had that name I don't know, but it was the roughest area. A lot of costermongers lived down there and the barrow boys and the fruit and vegetable people and they nearly all had horses and carts. The area was completely terraced, one end went into Pretoria Road, Tottenham and the other end went into Queen Street. There was an old pub there called the "Sun and Compass/The Three Compasses" (demolished). It's still there and they tell me that they used to take their horses through the house and keep them in the back garden.

== Media ==
In March 2009, Moscow-born novelist and broadcaster Zinovy Zinik travelled to the area to broadcast The Ghosts of Little Russia on BBC Radio 3.

== See also ==
- Russians in the United Kingdom
- Tottenham Outrage
