= Tottenham =

District of north London, England

Coordinates: 51°35′51″N 00°04′05″W

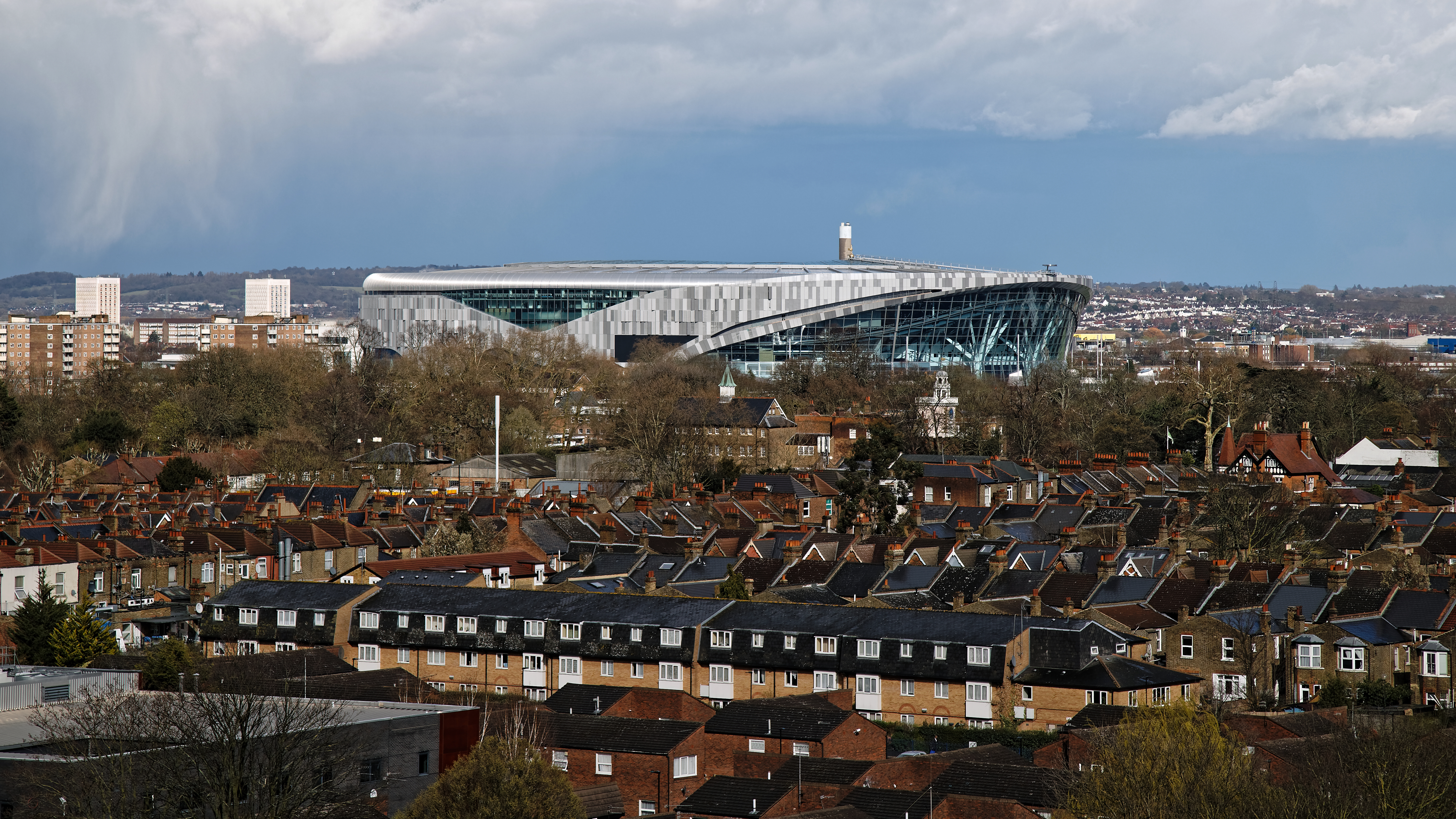
- View of Tottenham

- Location within Greater London
- Population: 129,237 (2011 census)
- OS grid reference: TQ33608950
  - Charing Cross: 6 mi (9.7 km) SSW
- London borough: Haringey
- Ceremonial county: Greater London
- Region: London
- Country: England
- Sovereign state: United Kingdom
- Post town: LONDON
- Postcode district: N15, N17
- Dialling code: 020
- Police: Metropolitan
- Fire: London
- Ambulance: London
- UK Parliament: Tottenham
- London Assembly: Enfield and Haringey

Tottenham (/ˈtɒtnəm/ TOT-nəm), is a district in north London, England, within the London Borough of Haringey. It is located in the ceremonial county of Greater London. Tottenham is centred 6 mi (10 km) north-northeast of Charing Cross, bordering Edmonton to the north, Walthamstow, across the River Lea, to the east, and Stamford Hill to the south, with Wood Green and Harringay to the west.

The area rapidly expanded in the late 19th century, becoming a working-class suburb of London following the advent of the railway and mass development of housing for the lower-middle and working classes. It has been home to the Premier League football club Tottenham Hotspur since 1882. The parish of Tottenham was granted urban district status in 1894 and municipal borough status in 1934. Following the Second World War, the area saw large-scale development of council housing, including tower blocks. Until 1965 Tottenham was in the historic county of Middlesex. In 1965, the borough of Tottenham merged with the municipal boroughs of Hornsey and Wood Green to form the London Borough of Haringey.

Tottenham is known for its multicultural, ethnically diverse population. Following an influx of an Afro-Caribbean population during the Windrush era in the mid-20th century, it became one of the most ethnically diverse areas in Britain. It has more recently become home to an increased population from Africa, Asia, South America and Eastern Europe. At the 2011 census, the population of Tottenham was 129,237.

== History ==
=== Toponymy ===
Tottenham is believed to have been named after Tota, a farmer, whose hamlet was mentioned in the Domesday Book. 'Tota's hamlet', it is thought, developed into 'Tottenham'. The settlement was recorded in the Domesday Book as Toteham, in the ancient hundred of Edmonton. It is not related to Tottenham Court Road in Central London, though the two names share a similar-sounding root.

=== Early history ===
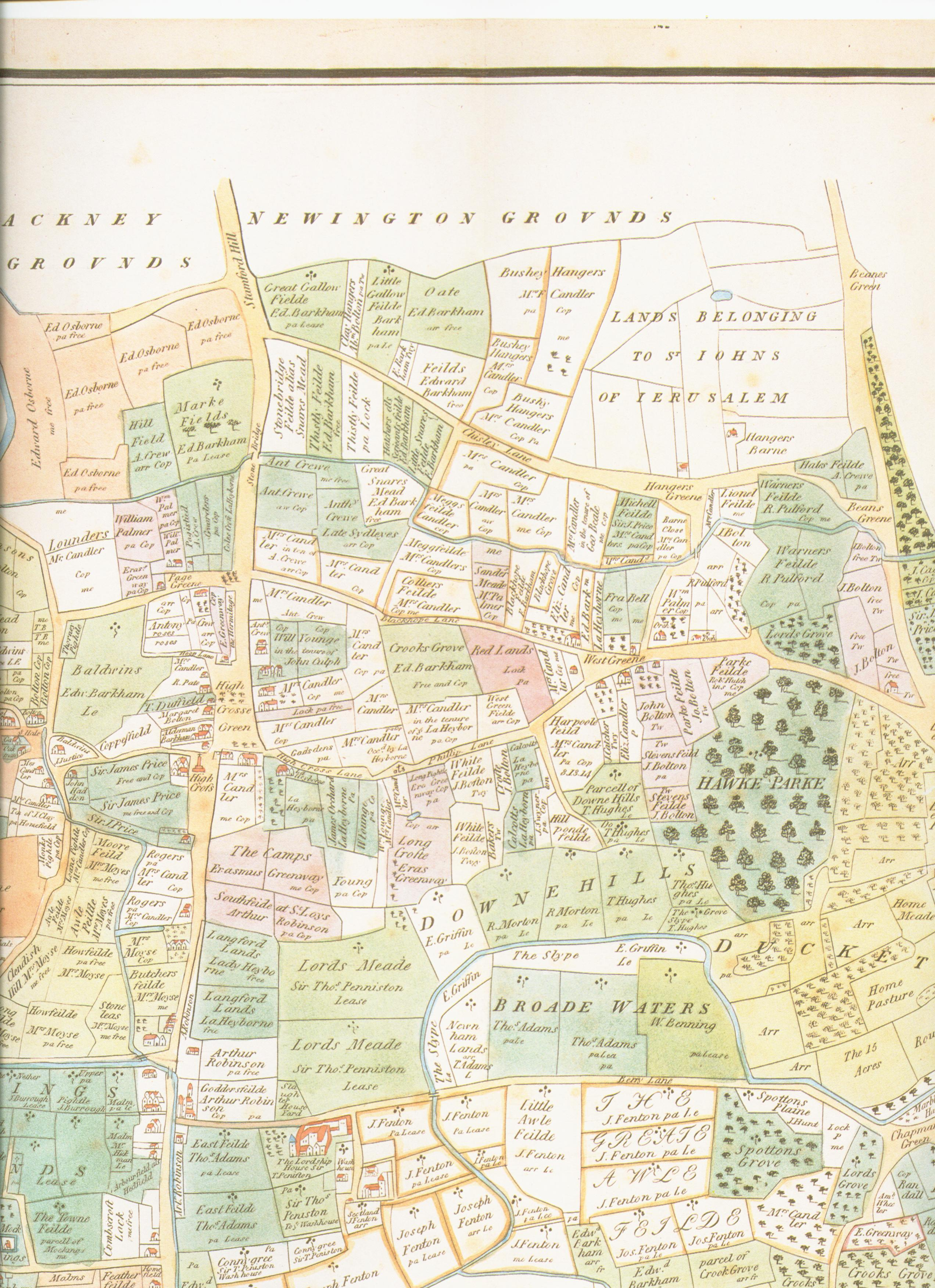
Map of Tottenham in 1619

There has been a settlement at Tottenham for over a thousand years. It grew up along the old Roman road, Ermine Street (some of which is part of the present A10 road), and between High Cross and Tottenham Hale, the present Monument Way.

When the Domesday Book was compiled in 1086, about 70 families lived within the area of the manor, mostly labourers working for the lord of the manor. A humorous poem entitled the Tournament of Tottenham, written around 1400, describes a mock battle between peasants vying for the reeve's daughter.

The River Lea (or Lee) was the eastern boundary between the Municipal Boroughs of Tottenham and Walthamstow. It is the ancient boundary between Middlesex and Essex and also formed the western boundary of the Viking controlled Danelaw. Today it is the boundary between the London Boroughs of Haringey and Waltham Forest. A major tributary of the Lea, the River Moselle, also crosses the borough from west to east, and often caused serious flooding until it was mostly covered in the 19th century.

From the Tudor period onwards, Tottenham became a popular recreation and leisure destination for wealthy Londoners. Henry VIII is known to have visited Bruce Castle and also hunted in Tottenham Wood. A rural Tottenham also featured in Izaak Walton's book The Compleat Angler, published in 1653. The area became noted for its large Quaker population and its schools (including Rowland Hill at Bruce Castle). Tottenham remained a semi-rural and upper middle class area until the 1870s.

=== Modern era ===
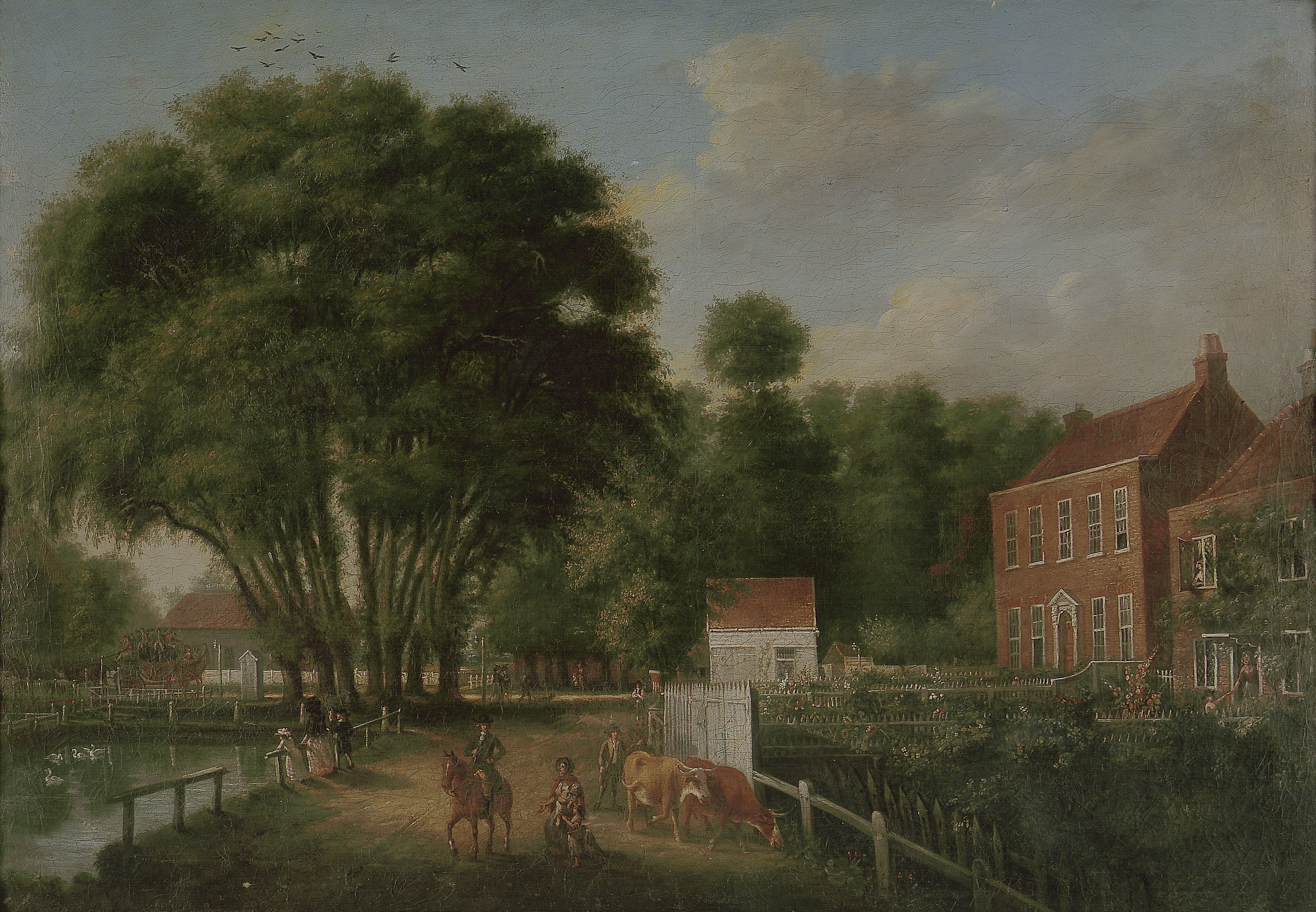
1790 painting of Tottenham by John Greenwood

In late 1870s, the Great Eastern Railway introduced special workman's trains and fares on its newly opened Enfield and Walthamstow branch lines. Tottenham's low-lying fields and market gardens were then rapidly transformed into cheap housing for the lower middle and working classes, who were able to commute cheaply to inner London. The workman's fare policy stimulated the relatively early development of the area into a London suburb.

In 1894, Tottenham was made an urban district and on 27 September 1934 it became a municipal borough. As from 1 April 1965, the municipal borough formed part of the London Borough of Haringey together with Hornsey and Wood Green.

An incident occurred on 23 January 1909, which was at the time known as the Tottenham Outrage. Two armed robbers, Latvian Jews of Russian extraction, held up the wages clerk of rubber works in Chestnut Road. They made their getaway via Tottenham Marshes and fled across the Lea. On the opposite bank of the river, they hijacked a Walthamstow Corporation tramcar, hotly pursued by the police on another tram. The hijacked tram was stopped but the robbers continued their flight on foot. After firing their weapons and killing two people, Ralph Joscelyne, aged 10, and PC William Tyler, they were eventually cornered by the police and shot themselves rather than be captured. Fourteen other people were wounded during the chase. The incident later became the subject of a silent film.

During the Second World War Tottenham was one of the many targets of the German air offensive against Britain. Bombs fell in the borough (Elmar Road) during the first air raid on London on 24 August 1940. The borough also received V-1 (four incidents) and V-2 hits, the last of which occurred on 15 March 1945. Wartime shortages led to the creation of Tottenham Pudding, a mixture of household waste food which was converted into feeding stuff for pigs and poultry. The "pudding" was named by Queen Mary on a visit to Tottenham Refuse Works. Production continued into the post-war period, its demise coinciding with the merging of the borough into the new London Borough of Haringey.

==== Riots ====
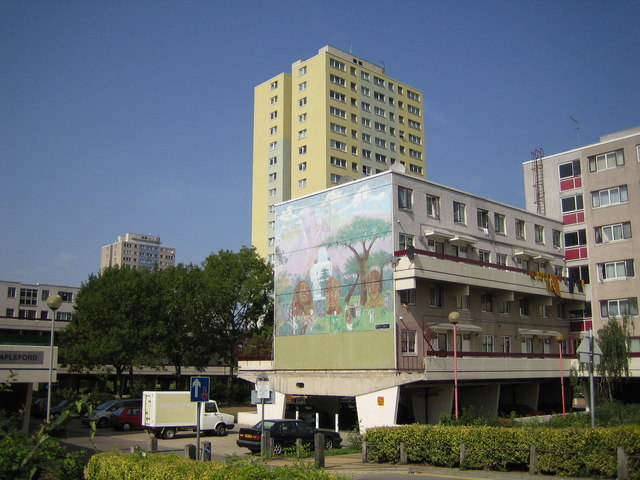
Broadwater Farm, the scene of rioting in 1985

The Broadwater Farm riot occurred around the Broadwater Farm Estate on 6 October 1985 following the death of Cynthia Jarrett. Jarrett was a resident of Tottenham who lived about one mile (two kilometres) from the estate, who died of heart failure during a police search of her home. The tension between local black youths and the largely white Metropolitan Police had been high due to a combination of local issues and the aftermath of riots in Brixton which had occurred in the previous week. The response of some of the black community in Tottenham and surrounding areas culminated in a riot beginning on Tottenham High Road and ending in Broadwater Farm Estate. One police officer, Keith Blakelock, was murdered; 58 policemen and 24 other people were injured in the fighting. Two of the policemen were injured by gunshots during the riot, the first time that firearms had been used in that type of confrontation.

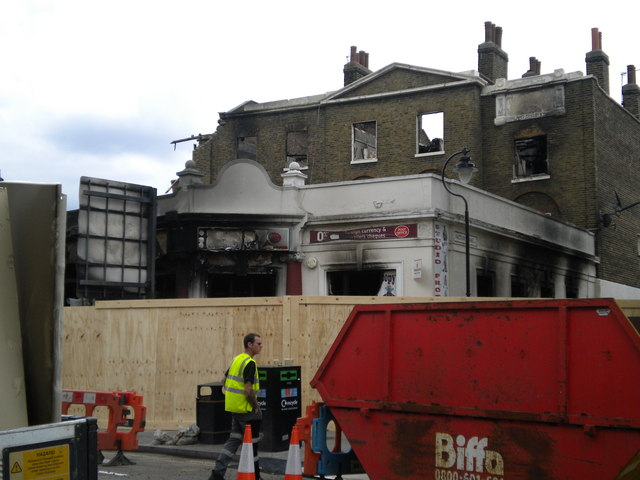
The former Bruce Grove Post Office was destroyed during the 2011 Tottenham riots.

The 2011 Tottenham riots were a series of riots precipitated by the fatal shooting of Mark Duggan, a 29-year-old man in Tottenham, by police officers on 4 August 2011. Attacks were carried out on two police cars, a bus, a Post Office and several local shops from 8:00 pm onwards on 6 August 2011. Riot police vans attended the scene of disturbances on Tottenham High Road. Later in the evening, the riot spread, with an Aldi supermarket and a branch of Allied Carpets also destroyed by fire, and widespread looting in nearby Wood Green shopping centre and the retail park at Tottenham Hale. Several flats above shops on Tottenham High Road collapsed due to the fires. Twenty-six shared ownership flats in the Union Point development above the Carpetright store—built in the landmark Cooperative department store building—were also destroyed by fire. The triggering event was when a group of over one hundred local Tottenham residents set out to undertake a protest march against the killing of Mark Duggan, who was shot by police officers assigned to Operation Trident earlier in the week. The crowd made up of Duggan's family and local community leaders, gathered outside Tottenham police station on 6 August 2011 to protest the failure of the police to provide family members with a formal notice of the killing. The circumstances surrounding Duggan's death were not entirely clear at the time of the riot. On 17 August 2011, the Prince of Wales and his wife Duchess of Cornwall visited an emergency centre to meet victims of the riots.

=== Railway history ===
- The Northern and Eastern Railway – running from Stratford to Broxbourne – was opened on 15 September 1840 with two stations in the district: Tottenham and Marsh Lane.
- The Tottenham & Hampstead Junction Railway was opened on 21 July 1868. South Tottenham station was opened in 1871. St Ann's Road opened in 1882 but closed after service on 8 August 1942.
- The Stoke Newington & Edmonton Railway – The section between Stoke Newington and Lower Edmonton opened on 22 July 1872 with stations in Tottenham at Stamford Hill (half of the station lies in the borough), Seven Sisters, Bruce Grove and White Hart Lane.
- The Palace Gates Line opened in Tottenham on 1 January 1878 with stations at Seven Sisters and West Green. Passenger services ceased in 1963 with the line finally closing on 7 February 1965.
- The Tottenham & Forest Gate Railway opened on 9 July 1894.
- The first section of the London Underground's Victoria line opened on 1 September 1968.

== Governance ==
=== Parliament ===
Tottenham is the biggest part of the parliamentary constituency of Tottenham. The constituency was created in 1885 when the first MP was Joseph Howard of the Conservative Party. The boundaries were redrawn in 1918, and Tottenham was divided into two separate constituencies: Tottenham North and Tottenham South. Since being reinstated in 1950, it has been predominantly represented by MPs from the Labour Party, with the exception of Alan Brown who defected to the Conservatives due to disagreement with the Labour Party's defence policy at the time. The current MP is former Deputy Prime Minister and Lord Chancellor David Lammy, who won a by-election in 2000 following the death of Bernie Grant. Lammy served as Foreign Secretary from 2024-25.

=== Local government ===
Tottenham was at the centre of a local administrative area from the medieval period until 1965. The administrative area developed from a parish in Middlesex into an urban sanitary district in 1875, after a local board of health had been established in 1850. It was then divided in 1888 and Wood Green became a separate authority. In 1894, Tottenham was reconstituted first as an urban district, based at Tottenham Town Hall, then as a municipal borough in 1934. Under the Local Government Act 1963, it became part of the larger London Borough of Haringey. The Tottenham neighbourhood is now one of twenty neighbourhoods in Haringey.

== Geography ==
Tottenham's elevation is approximately 33 ft (10 m) above sea level.

=== Sub-districts ===
Because of Tottenham's long history as a borough, the Tottenham name is used by some to this day to describe the whole of the area formerly covered by the old borough, incorporating the N17 postcode area and part of N15. However, there are differing views as to what constitutes the Tottenham neighbourhood in the present day. Many think of Tottenham today as most of the area covered by the N17 post code, sometimes using the phrase 'Tottenham Proper' to describe it and to distinguish it from the other parts of the old borough.

- North: This area stretches along Tottenham High Road from the Edmonton border in the north to Lordship Lane in the south: districts include Little Russia and Northumberland Park.
- Central: Continuing along the high road, the central area includes Tottenham Hale, as well as Tottenham Hale station and retail park.
- West: To the west of the area are Broadwater Farm and the Tower Gardens Estate.
- South: Further along the A10 road until St Ann's Road, including South Tottenham and Seven Sisters.

=== Neighbouring areas ===
- Edmonton
- Harringay
- Noel Park
- Palmers Green
- St Ann's
- Tottenham Hale
- Walthamstow
- West Green
- Wood Green
- South Tottenham

== Demography ==
A claim made by MP David Lammy in 2011, indicated that at that time Tottenham had the highest unemployment rate in London and the eighth highest in the United Kingdom, and it had some of the highest poverty rates within the country.

=== Ethnic composition ===
Tottenham has a multicultural population, with many ethnic groups inhabiting the area. It contains one of the largest and most significant populations of Afro-Caribbean people. These were among the earliest groups of immigrants to settle in the area, starting from the UK's Windrush era. The Seven Sisters ward has the largest proportion of Jewish residents among Haringey wards, at 18.1%.

In the 2011 UK Census, the ethnic composition of the Tottenham constituency, of which Tottenham is a large part, was as follows:

- 27.7% Other White
- 26.7% Black
- 22.3% White British
- 10.7% Asian
- 12.6% Other/Mixed

== Crime ==
Tottenham has been one of the main hotspots for gangs and gun crime in the United Kingdom during the past three decades since the 90s. This followed the rise of gangs and drug wars throughout the area, notably those involving the Tottenham Mandem gang and various gangs from Hackney and all of the areas surrounding Tottenham, and the emergence of an organised crime ring known as the Turkish mafia fought other London gangs to allegedly control more than 90% of the UK's heroin market.

In 1999, Tottenham was identified as one of the yardies' strongholds in London, along with Hackney, Harlesden, Peckham and Brixton.

== Landmarks and notable places ==
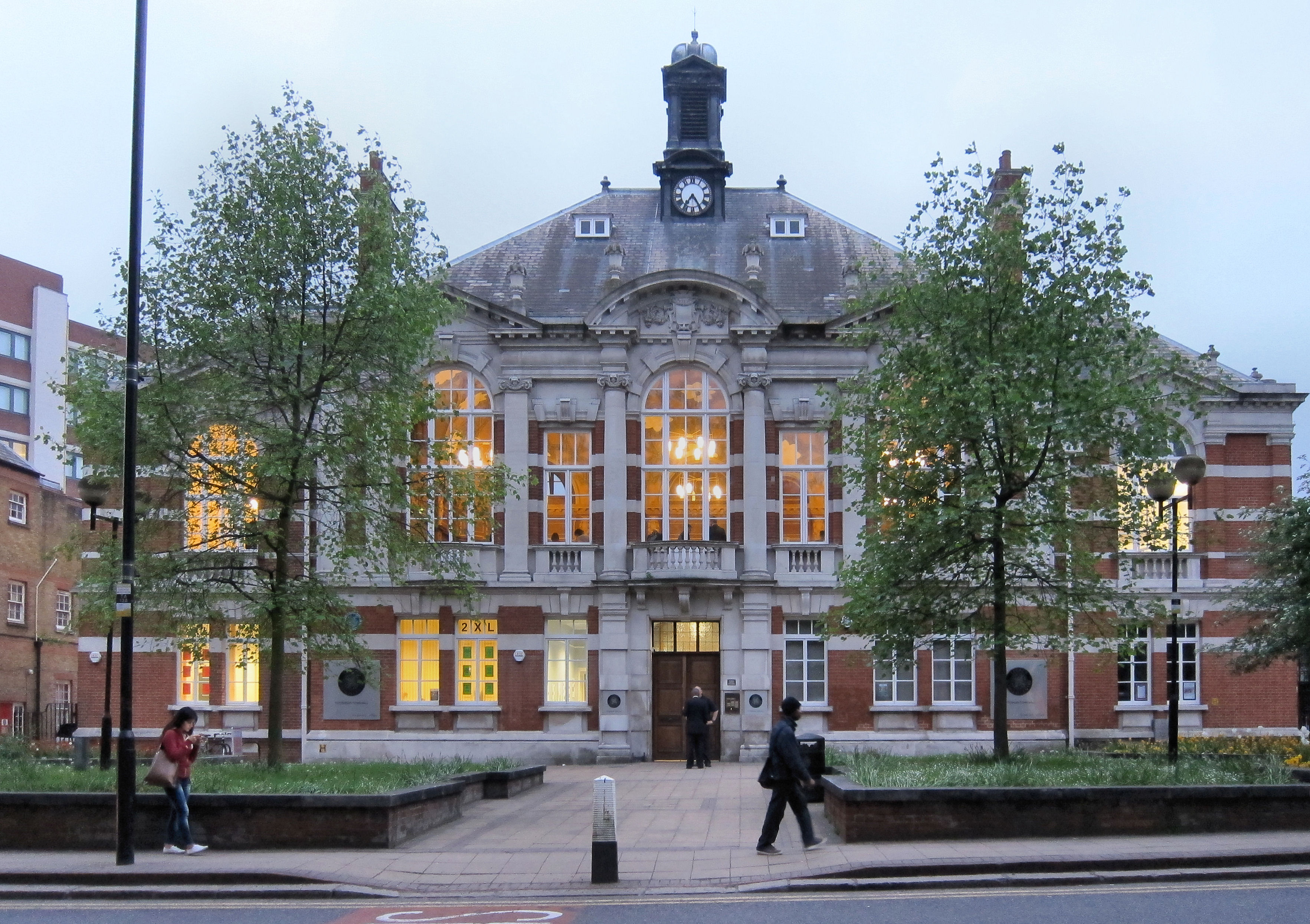
Tottenham Town Hall

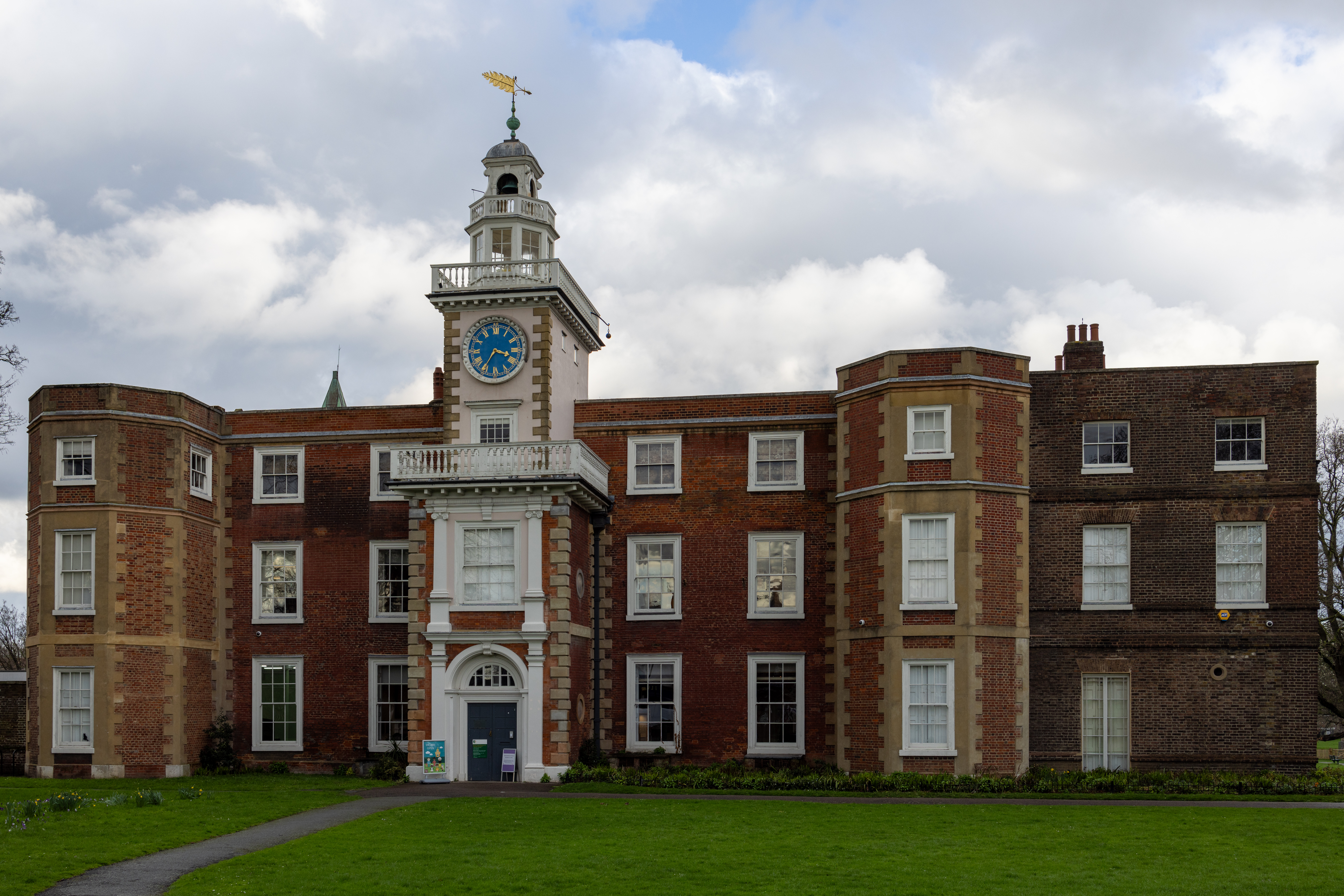
Bruce Castle, formerly known as the Lordship House, is now a local museum.

- All Hallows Church – This is the oldest surviving building in Haringey and dates back to Norman times. For more than 700 years it was the original parish church for Tottenham. Presented in 1802 with a bell from the Quebec Garrison, which was captured from the French in the 1759 Battle of Quebec, Canada. Adjacent to the church is Tottenham Cemetery.
- Broadwater Farm – Housing estate completed 1967. Site of the Broadwater Farm riot in 1985
- Brook Street Chapel – Non-denominational Christian chapel, established in 1839, and one of the earliest Plymouth Brethren /Open Brethren assemblies in London that still exists. The church was associated with local notable Christians such as Hudson Taylor, Dr Barnardo, John Eliot Howard, Luke Howard and Philip Gosse.
- Bruce Castle, Lordship Lane – Grade I listed, it was Tottenham's manor house and dates from the sixteenth century, with alterations by subsequent occupants. It was given the name 'Bruce Castle' during the seventeenth century by the 2nd Lord Coleraine, who was Lord of the Manor at the time. He named it after 'Robert the Bruce', whose family had been lords of the manor during the medieval period. The building was purchased by the Hill family, who turned it into a progressive school. Sir Rowland Hill was its first headmaster, and he was living there in 1840 when he, as Postmaster General, introduced the Uniform Penny Post. Now a local history museum, Bruce Castle holds the archives of the London Borough of Haringey.
- 7 Bruce Grove – The building features an English Heritage blue plaque commemorating Luke Howard (1772–1864), the 'Father of Meteorology', who named the clouds in 1802
- Chapel Place, White Hart Lane: now the Living Word Temple, it was built in 1826 as a Roman Catholic chapel dedicated to St Francis de Sales, and founded the eponymous school in Brereton Road. Later served as a clothes factory before being restored to use as a place of worship.
- Clyde Circus conservation area
- Downhills Park
- Edmanson's Close – Previously known as the Almshouses of the Drapers' Company, they were built in 1870 and were established through the generosity of three 17th-century benefactors: Sir John Jolles, John Pemel and John Edmanson.
- High Cross – Erected sometime between 1600 and 1609 on the site of an earlier Christian cross, although there is some speculation that the first structure on the site was a Roman beacon or marker, situated on a low summit on Ermine Street. Tottenham High Cross is often mistakenly thought to be an Eleanor cross.
- Lordship Recreation Ground
- Markfield Beam Engine
- Northumberland Development Project, incorporating a new stadium for Tottenham Hotspur
- Northumberland Row – Erected circa 1740 on the site of the former Smithson seat, previously that of the Hynningham family. The gate piers are possibly from Bruce Castle. The wrought iron gate bears the monogram HS for one of the two Hugh Smithsons, both Tottenham landowners and sometime MPs for Middlesex.
- Tottenham Cemetery – A large cemetery, which makes up part of an open access area of land and habitat, along with Bruce Castle Park and All Hallows Churchyard
- Tottenham Marshes (part of the Lee Valley Regional Park)
- Tottenham War Services Institute
- Tower Gardens Estate – Previously known as the LCC White Hart Lane Estate, this "out of county" LCC cottage housing estate was constructed beginning in 1904. The architectural style is said to be inspired by houses in Ghent, Belgium. The estate was the home of Harry Champion, a well-known music hall star and performer of the song "I'm Henery the Eighth, I Am".
- Tottenham Town Hall – A Grade II listed Edwardian building.

== Transport ==
=== London Underground ===
The Victoria line passes through Tottenham, calling at Seven Sisters and Tottenham Hale. This connects Tottenham directly to Walthamstow, the West End and Brixton. The former is located along the A10, directly south of Tottenham High Road, while Tottenham Hale tube station is located in the area of the same name, southeast of central Tottenham.

The line has its operating depot in the area at Northumberland Park.

The district is a short distance east of the Piccadilly Line, Turnpike Lane tube station now within walking distance of the western extremity of the area, lay within the former Borough of Tottenham when opened in 1932.

=== National Rail ===
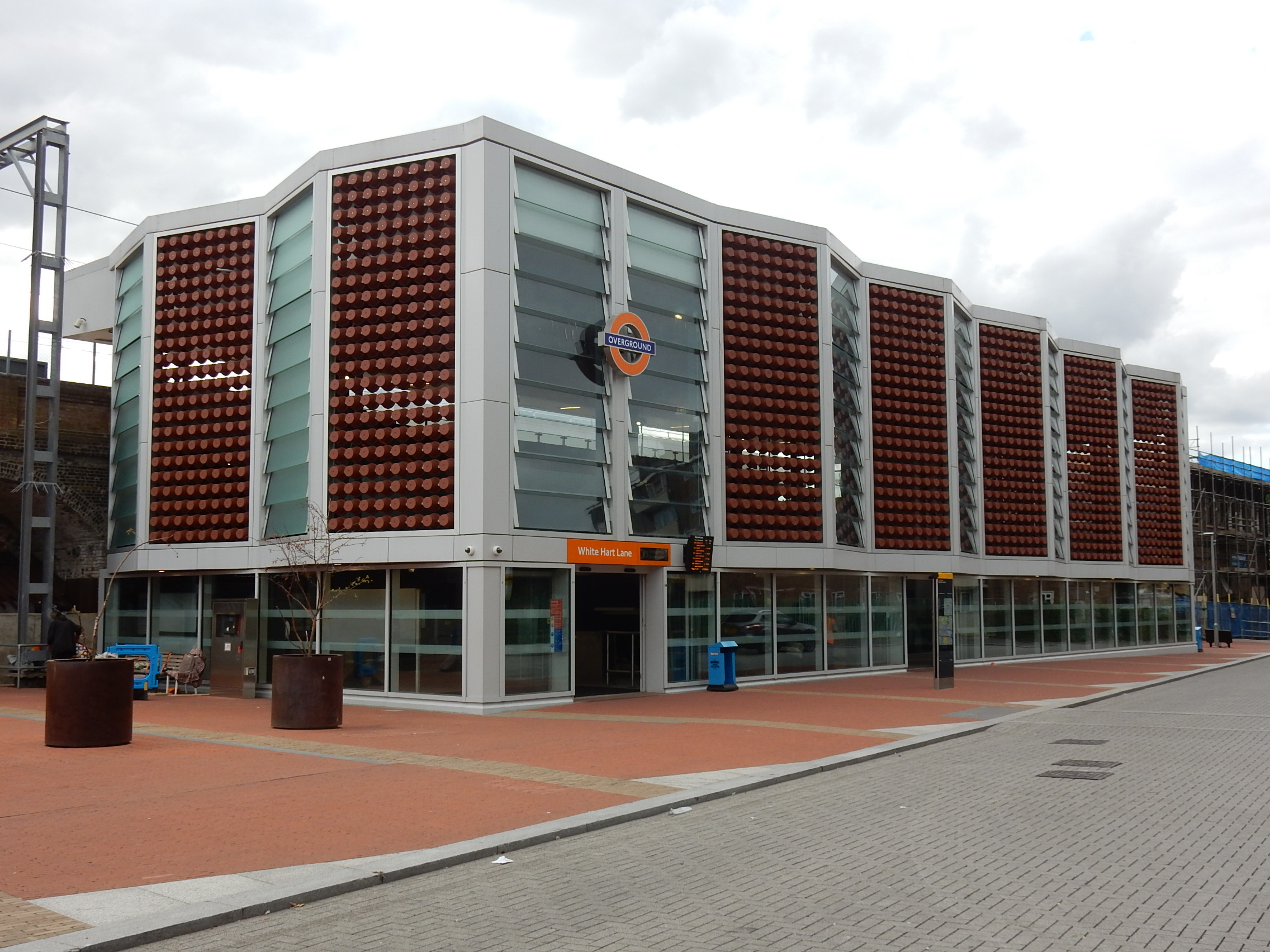
White Hart Lane station, as viewed from Love Lane

The area is served by two train operating companies:

==== London Overground ====
- From Seven Sisters, Bruce Grove and White Hart Lane stations, the Lea Valley lines provide services between Liverpool Street, Chingford, Cheshunt and Enfield Town
- The Gospel Oak to Barking line serves South Tottenham station.

==== Greater Anglia ====
- The Lea Valley lines, via Tottenham Hale and Northumberland Park, host stopping services between Liverpool Street, Stratford, Cheshunt, Hertford East and Bishops Stortford.
- The West Anglia Main Line links Tottenham Hale station with Liverpool Street, Bishop's Stortford, Stansted Airport and Cambridge.

=== Buses ===
Tottenham is well served by many London Bus routes, including: 41, 76, 123, 149, 192, 230, 243, 259, 279, 318, 341, 476, W3 and W4

=== Cycling ===
The area is connected to both London and National cycle networks, with provisions for recreational and commuter cycling across Tottenham.

- National Cycle Route 1 (NCR 1) – through Tottenham, NCR 1 runs along a north–south axis, following the River Lea towpath. To the south, NCR 1 passes through Hackney Marshes and Victoria Park. The route terminates in Dover, Kent. To the north, NCR 1 follows the towpath through Enfield Lock towards Roydon, Essex. The route terminates in the Shetland Islands, Scotland.
- Cycle Superhighway 1 (CS1) – CS1 begins in Tottenham, on the High Road near the Tottenham Hotspur stadium. CS1 runs north–south on residential or quiet roads from Tottenham, through Dalston to the City of London. Some of the route runs on segregated cycle track between Seven Sisters and South Tottenham railway stations.
- Quietway 2 (Q2) – Q2 skirts around Tottenham's south-eastern edge. Running on towpaths, quiet roads and residential streets, Q2 runs unbroken from Russell Square to Walthamstow.
- EuroVelo 2 (The Capitals Route) – EuroVelo 2 (EV2) is a long-distance, international cycle route running from Moscow, Russia to Galway, Ireland. The route follows the course of NCR 1 through Tottenham.

The River Lea towpath is a shared-use path maintained by the Canal and River Trust.

Cycling infrastructure in maintained primarily by Transport for London (TfL) and the London Borough of Haringey.

== Sport ==
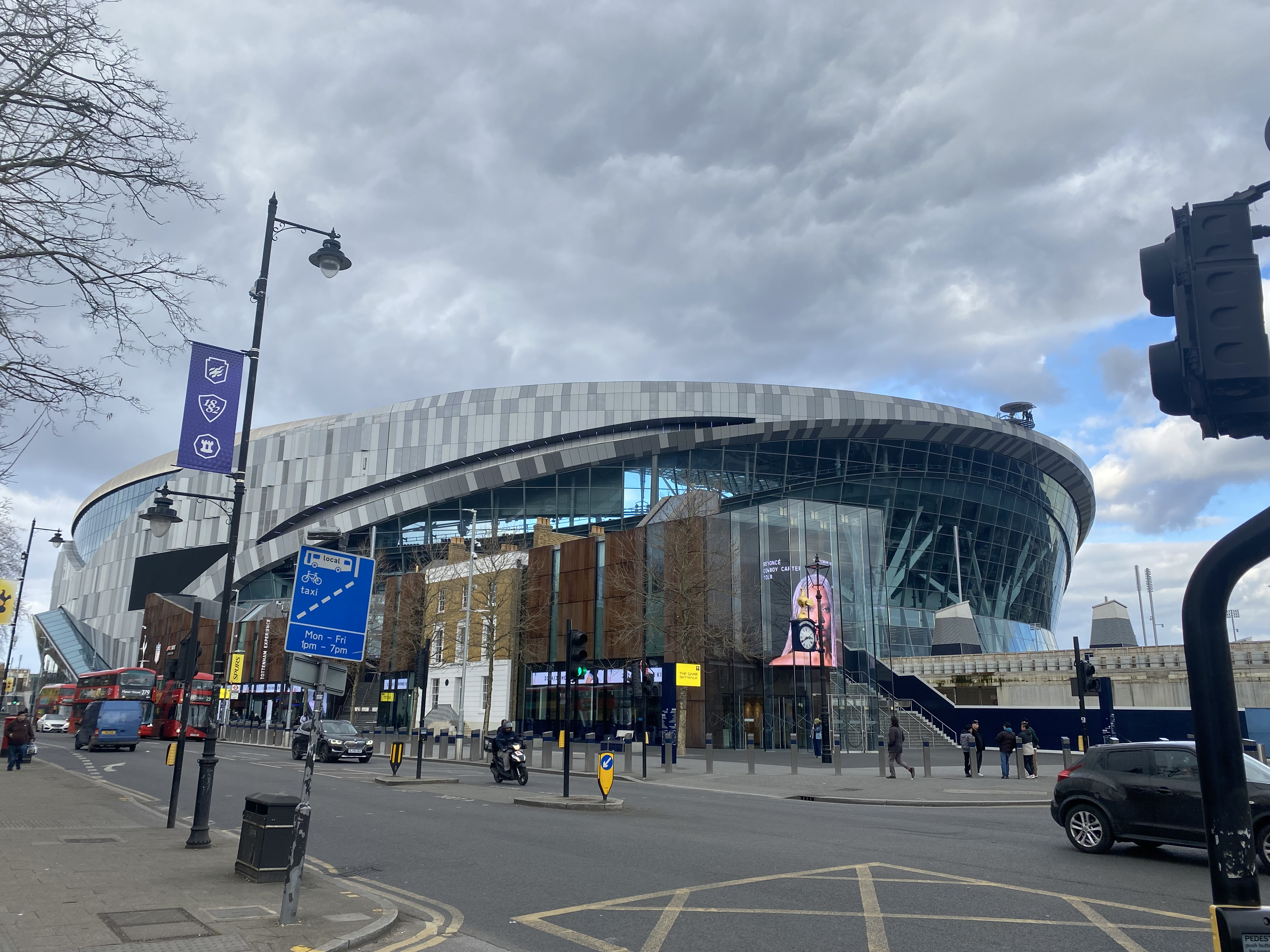
Tottenham Hotspur Stadium is the third-largest football stadium in England.

Tottenham is the home of Premier League football club Tottenham Hotspur. From 1899 until 2017, the club's home ground was White Hart Lane. In 2017, White Hart Lane ground closed and demolition commenced to make way for a new stadium on the same site, known as the Tottenham Hotspur Stadium, as part of a wider project for the redevelopment of the area. The new stadium was due to open in September 2018, but was delayed until later in the 2018–19 season. The stadium was opened on 3 April 2019. For the 2017–18 season and most of the 2018–19 season, the club played their home games at Wembley.

Tottenham also has two non-League football clubs, Haringey Borough F.C. who currently play at Coles Park Stadium and Park View who play at the White Hart Lane Community Sports Centre.

== Media ==
The Tottenham & Wood Green Independent is a local newspaper published by Newsquest.

== Tottenham cake ==
Tottenham cake is a sponge cake baked in large metal trays, covered either in pink icing or jam (and occasionally decorated with shredded desiccated coconut). Tottenham cake's origins are unclear. There is reference to "tottenham cakes" as early as 1891 when the Far Famed Cake Company are credited as the originators of the confection. Another source states the cake "was originally sold by the baker Henry Chalkley from 1901, who was a Friend (or Quaker), at the price of one old penny, with smaller mis-shaped pieces sold for half an old penny". The pink colouring was derived from mulberries found growing at the Tottenham Friends burial ground. Originally "a peculiar local invention" of north London, the cake was later mass-produced by bakery chains such as Percy Ingle and Greggs. The cake was featured on The Great British Bake Off TV programme broadcast Tuesday 17 September 2013 on BBC2.
