= Tottenham High Cross =

Coordinates: 51°35′20″N 0°4′13″W

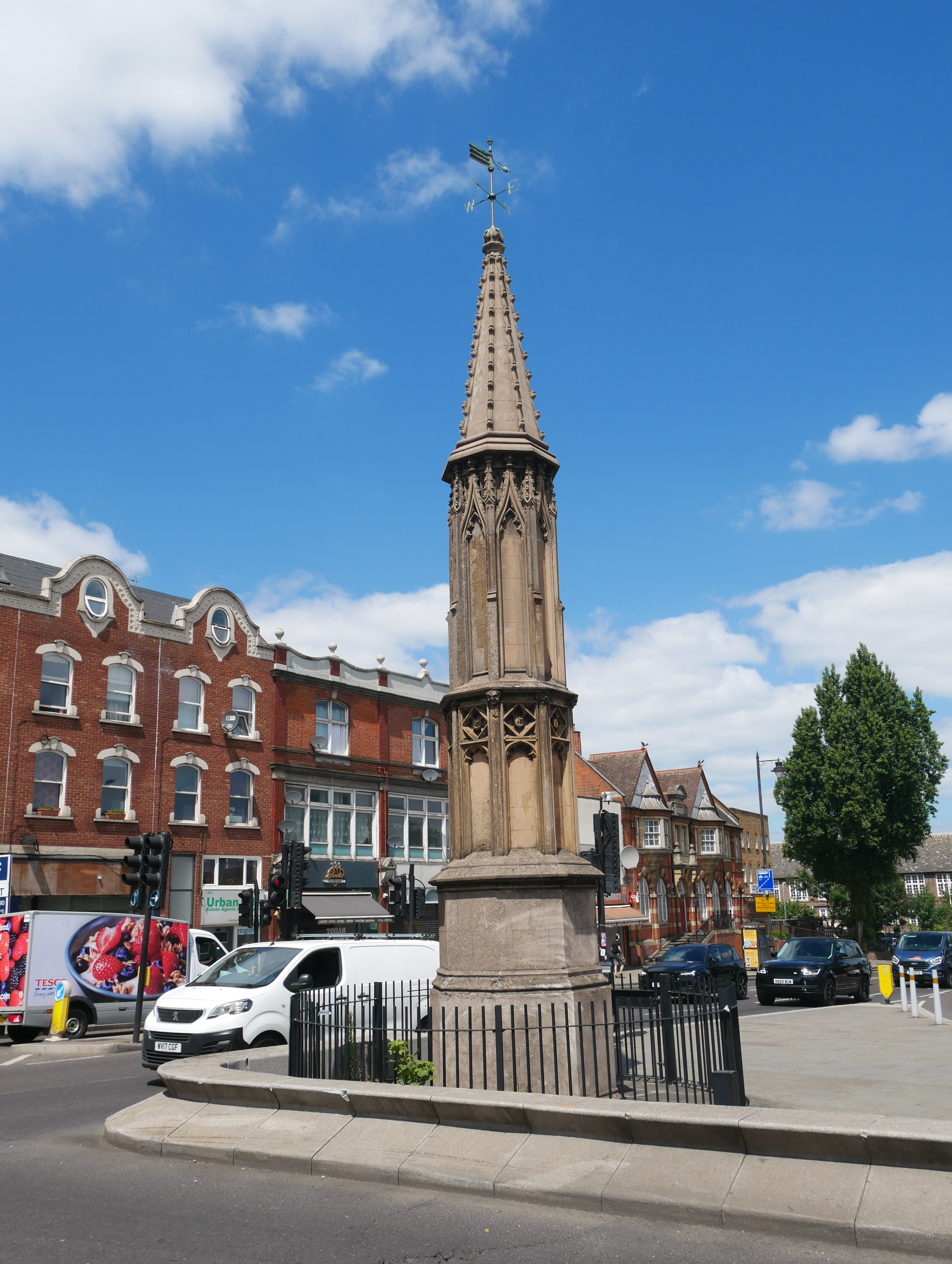
Tottenham High Cross, Haringey (2022)

Tottenham High Cross was erected in Tottenham sometime between 1600 and 1609 by Owen Wood, Dean of Armagh, on the site of a wooden wayside cross first mentioned in 1409, and marks what was the centre of Tottenham Village. It is situated on a low summit on Ermine Street, which became the Tottenham High Road, as it is now known.

The high cross was constructed of plain brick, in an octagonal, four level design, which was later stuccoed and ornamented in the Gothic style in 1809.

Tottenham High Cross is often mistakenly thought to be an Eleanor cross, possibly because it is only a few miles south of one of the true Eleanor crosses at Waltham Cross.

== See also ==
- List of public art in Haringey
