= White Hart Lane railway station =

London Overground station

White Hart Lane
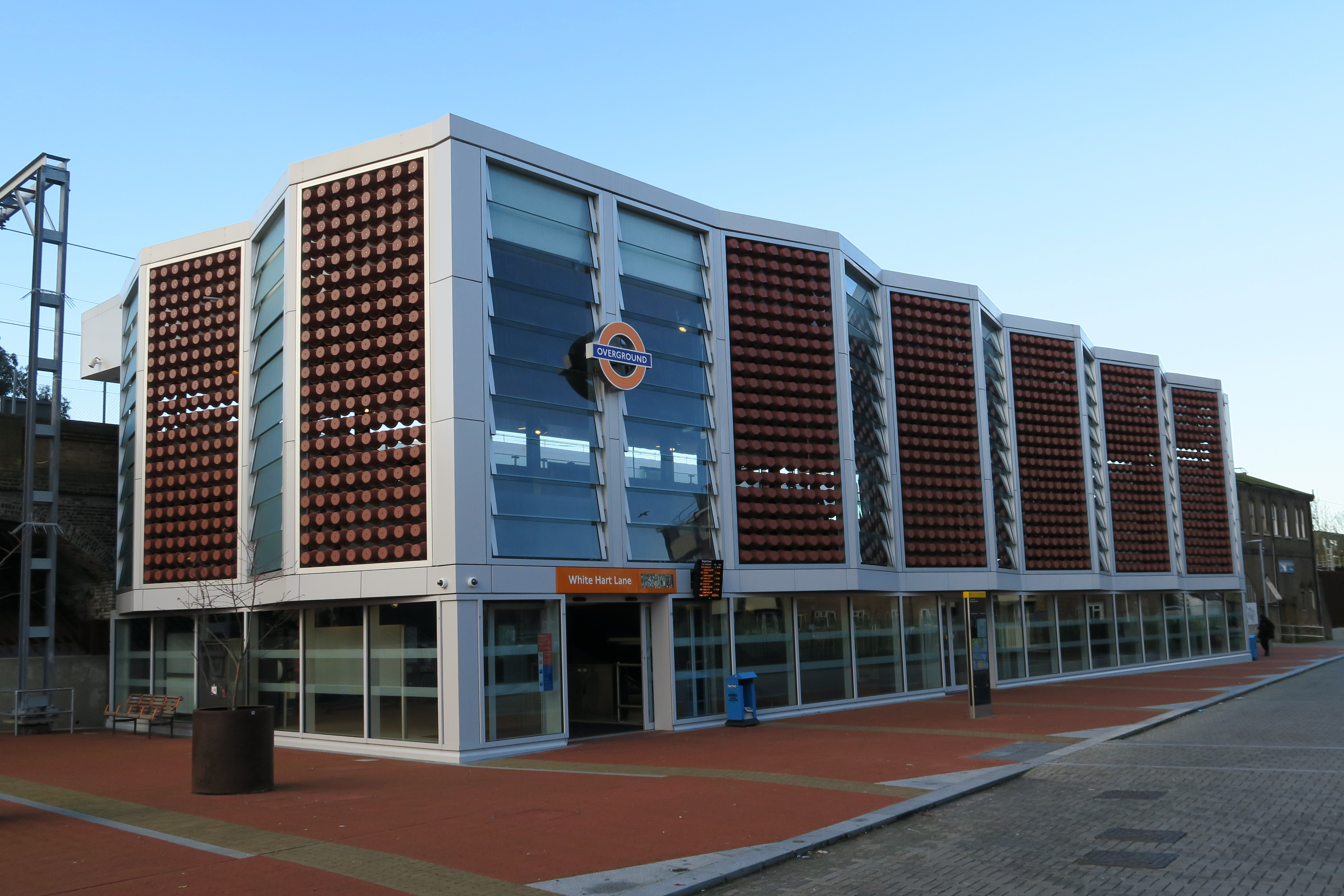
- Station entrance on Love Lane in December 2020
- Interactive map of White Hart Lane

General information
- Location: Tottenham
- Local authority: London Borough of Haringey
- Managed by: London Overground
- Station code: WHL
- DfT category: D
- Number of platforms: 2
- Accessible: Yes
- Fare zone: 3

National Rail annual entry and exit
- 2020–21: ▼0.597 million
- 2021–22: ▲1.586 million
- 2022–23: ▲1.991 million
- 2023–24: ▲2.594 million
- 2024–25: ▲2.617 million

Key dates
- 22 July 1872: Opened

Other information
- External links: Departures; Facilities
- Coordinates: 51.605°N 0.071°W

White Hart Lane is a station on the Weaver line of the London Overground, located in Tottenham in the London Borough of Haringey in North London. It is 7 miles 11 chains (11.5 km) from London Liverpool Street and is situated between Bruce Grove and Silver Street stations. It is in London fare zone 3. The station is close to Bruce Grove and the Tottenham Hotspur Stadium, the home ground of Tottenham Hotspur Football Club.

Originally opened as a station on the Stoke Newington & Edmonton Railway in 1872, the station then became part of the Great Eastern Railway and subsequently the London and North Eastern Railway. The stadium at White Hart Lane opened in 1899 and the station has historically been used as a transport connection to it. The station was rebuilt ending in 2019, but the original 1872 building remains in situ.

== History ==
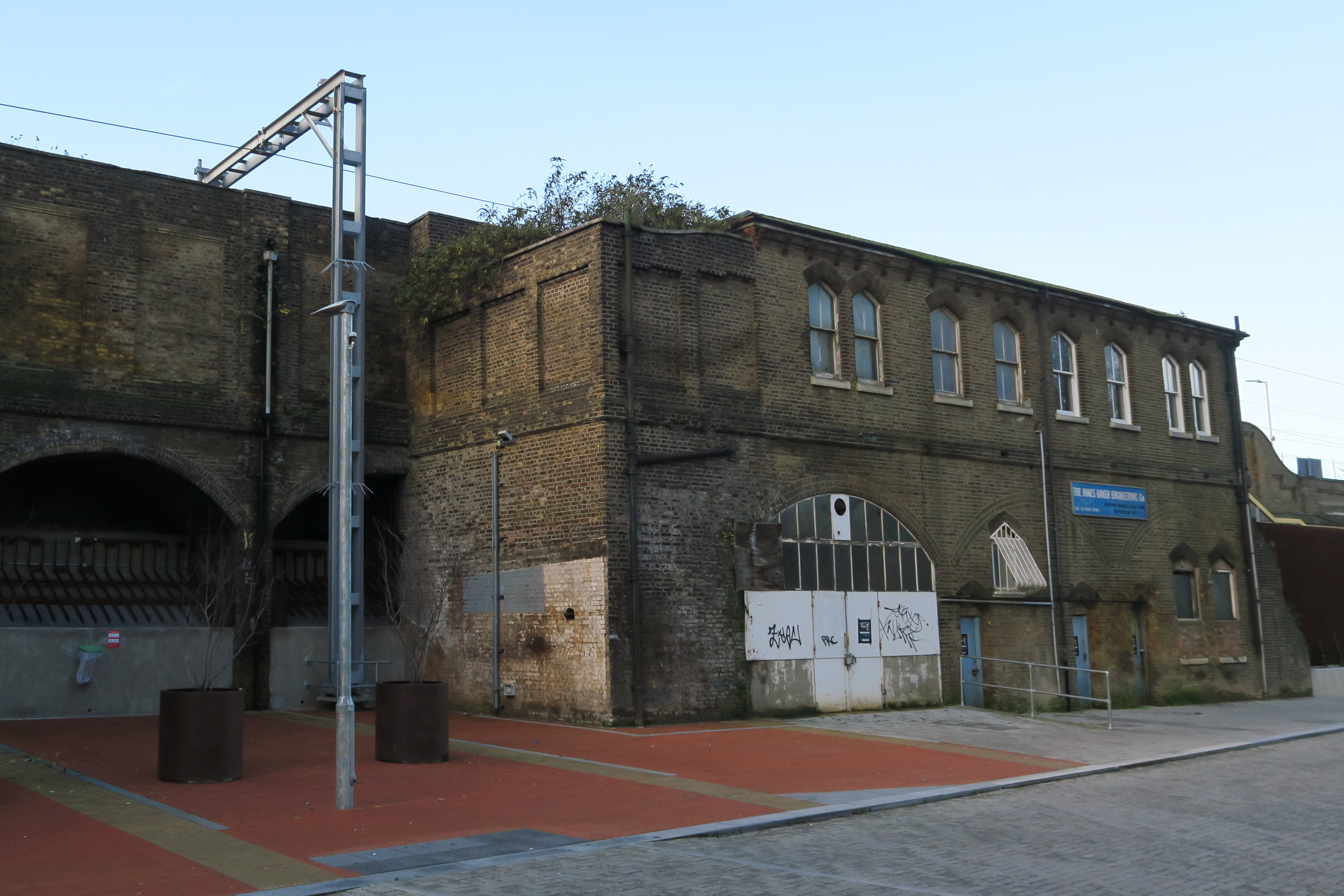
Victorian-era station building at White Hart Lane in December 2020

White Hart Lane was originally a stop on the Stoke Newington & Edmonton Railway line (part of Great Eastern Railway) which opened on 22 July 1872. The station was named after the local road on which it is sited – White Hart Lane. The road probably acquired its name in the 17th century but part of it existed earlier as Apeland Street, and it was once the location of a spring called Bishop's Well. The area was semi-rural before the arrival of railway with some villas and other buildings along Tottenham High Road, and the opening of the station drew increasing population to the area, which then developed to become more urban. The line was extended to Enfield, and within a few years 4 trains per hour was running from Liverpool Street to Enfield, more at peak hours, with two reversing at White Hart Lane. It was also linked to Cheshunt in October 1891, initially with services that ran only between White Hart Lane and Cheshunt. In addition to the passenger service, there were also freight facilities on the up side with a refuge siding on the opposite side until 1968.

The original station building built in 1872 was a two-storey brick structure. The White Hart Lane football stadium (which had the same name as the station) opened in 1899 and the station became a point of arrival for fans attending matches at the stadium. As attendance increased, wide exit doors were provided to cope with the 10,000-strong crowds that passed through the station to the stadium on match days. At its busiest, train were running at intervals of under five minutes, the maximum possible with steam trains. In 1961, after the line had been electrified, trains from Liverpool Street were running at intervals of four minutes at its peak on match days, with additional trains from Hertford East and Bishop's Stortford.

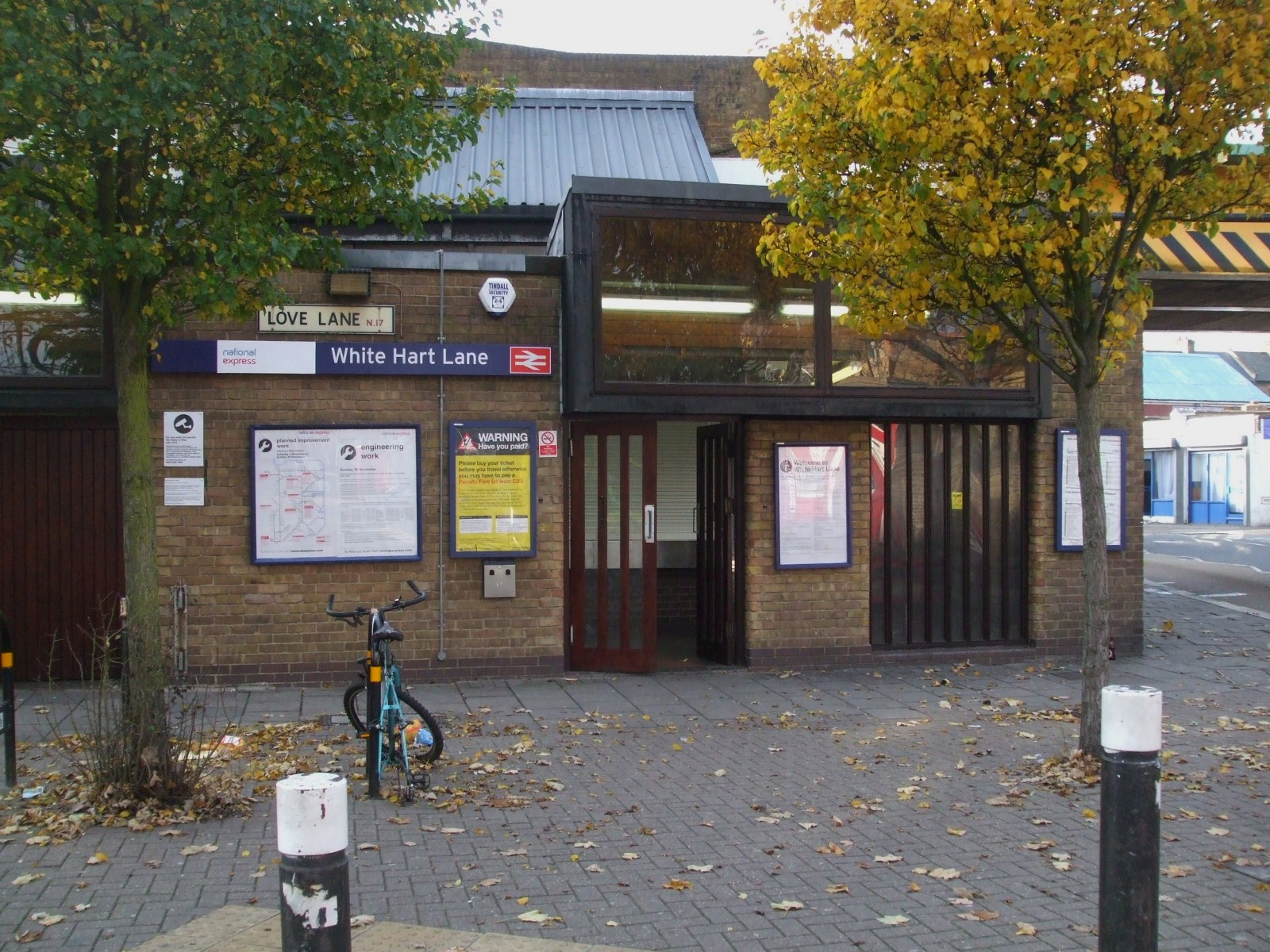
Station entrance beside the road White Hart Lane used from 1978 to 2019, photo taken in November 2008

In 1957, a scheme was initiated to raise the railway bridge over the adjoining road White Hart Lane by 2 ft 9 in (84 cm) so that double-decker buses may pass under. This required substantial alterations to the platforms and lifting of the tracks which was completed in 1958. The work was one of the schemes undertaken in preparation for the electrification of the line. In 1962, a new entrance was added at the station for football fans returning after matches.

In 1978, a fire caused some damage to old station, and a new ticket office was built to the north of the original Victorian building. The entrance frontage beside the road of White Hart Lane dates from this period. New staircases were also constructed on both sides of the exteriors of the platforms for passengers' access.

The Provisional IRA planted a small bomb at the station on 1 March 1992, which coincided with a League Cup semi-final match against Nottingham Forest at White Hart Lane. The match was delayed while the device was made safe.

Today, the station and services that call are operated by the London Overground, which took over from Abellio Greater Anglia in May 2015. At that time, the station was added to the Tube map. The Lea Valley line it is on has been renamed the Weaver line.

=== Rebuilding ===
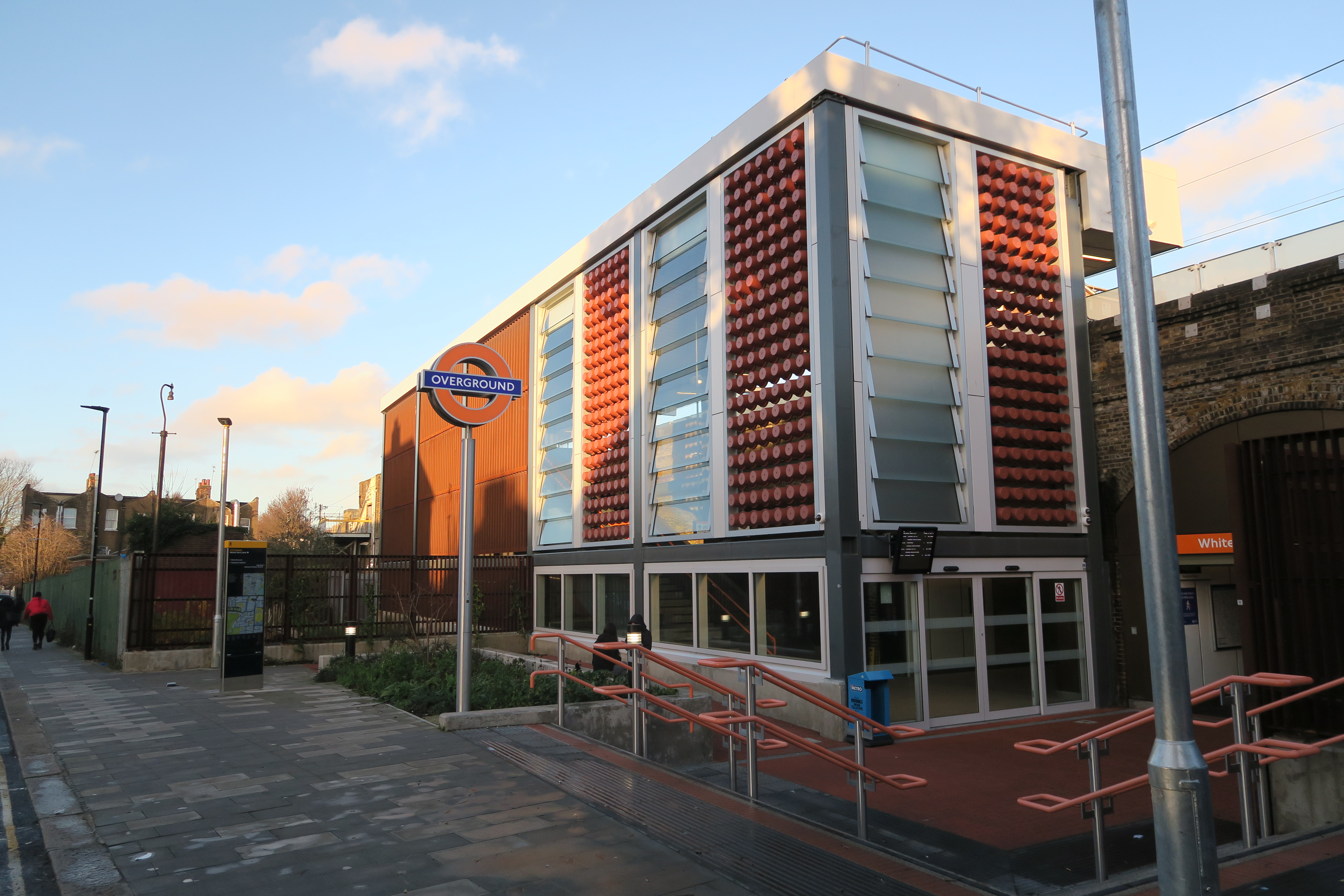
Penshurst Road entrance of White Hart Lane railway station in December 2020

As part of the Northumberland Development Project to redevelop the White Hart Lane stadium and regenerate the area the station was also selected to be upgraded. This involved the building of a new ticket hall to the south of the original station building on Love Lane to create a better connection with Tottenham High Road, and an additional entrance on Penshurst Road as well as two lifts for step-free access to ease the bottlenecking of fans on match day. There is also additional new cycle parking. The rebuilding, which was undertaken by Taylor Woodrow Construction, was originally scheduled to start in autumn 2017 and finish in spring 2019 but was delayed. The new entrance to the station was opened on 26 August 2019.

Discussions were reported in 2019 regarding a proposal that the station could be renamed "Tottenham Hotspur". No arrangement was ultimately reached, but the London Assembly Budget and Performance Committee expressed that they remained open to exploring that, and similar, brand deals.

== Tottenham Hotspur matches ==
On days that see football matches at Tottenham Hotspur's ground nearby the station sees increased usage. A special timetable operates on match days, with trains arriving and departing every two to three minutes before and after the game. There is an increase in the number of trains to and from the line's termini at Cheshunt and Enfield Town, as well as starting and terminating White Hart Lane trains and services to and from Edmonton Green and Liverpool Street.

Historically, additional match-day services also connected to the Gospel Oak to Barking line and to Stratford from Cheshunt.

== Services ==
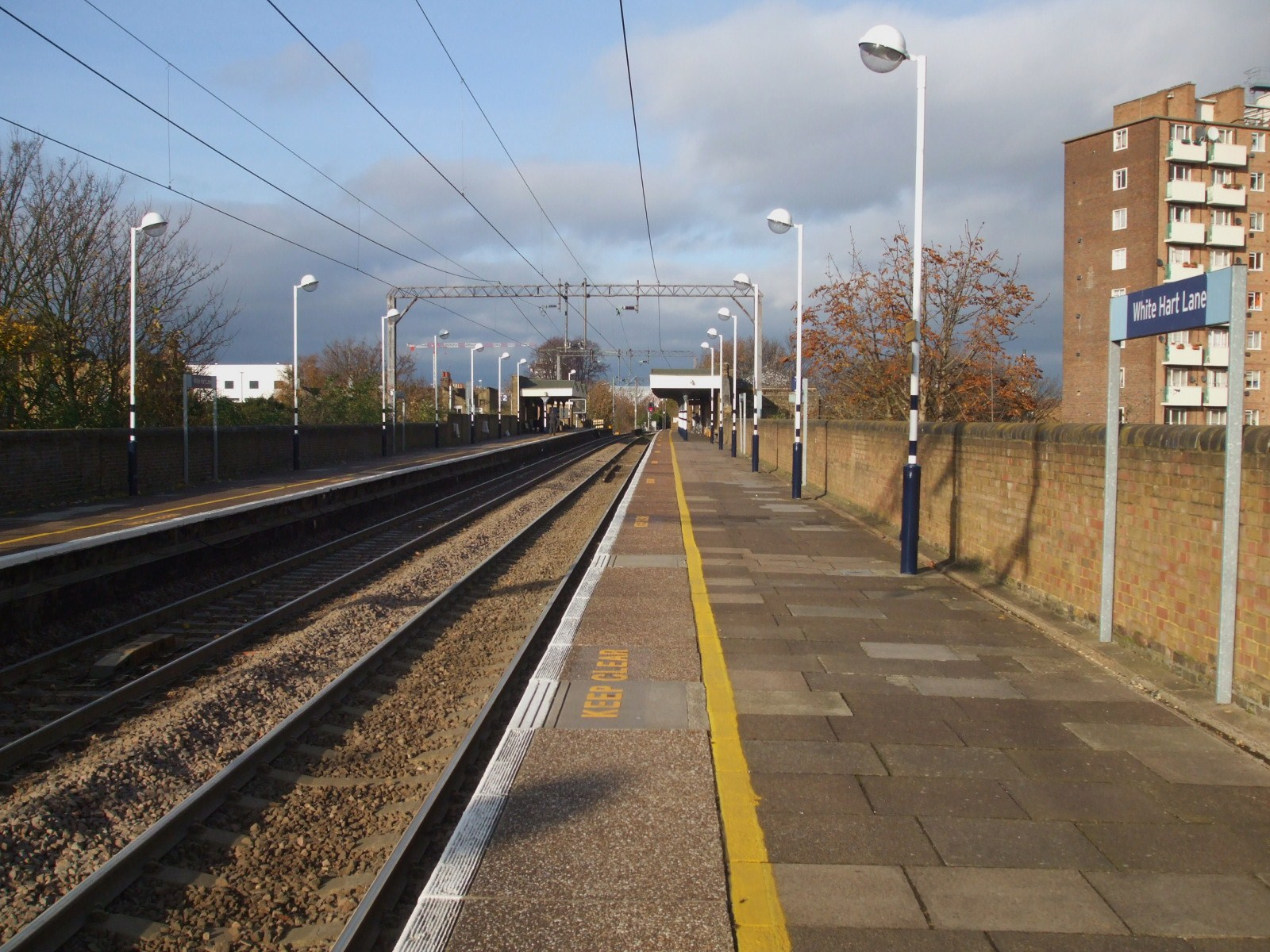
Platforms at White Hart Lane in November 2008

All services at White Hart Lane are operated as part of the Weaver line of the London Overground using Class 710 EMUs.

The typical off-peak service in trains per hour is:

- 4 tph to London Liverpool Street
- 2 tph to Cheshunt
- 2 tph to Enfield Town

Additional services call at the station during the peak hours (when the Enfield Town service is doubled to 4 tph), and on matchdays at the nearby Tottenham Hotspur Stadium.

Preceding station	London Overground	Following station
Bruce Grove towards Liverpool Street	Weaver line Lea Valley lines	Silver Street towards Cheshunt or Enfield Town

== Connections ==
London Buses routes 149, 259, 279, W3 and night route N279 serve the station.
