= London Buses route 149 =

London bus route

149
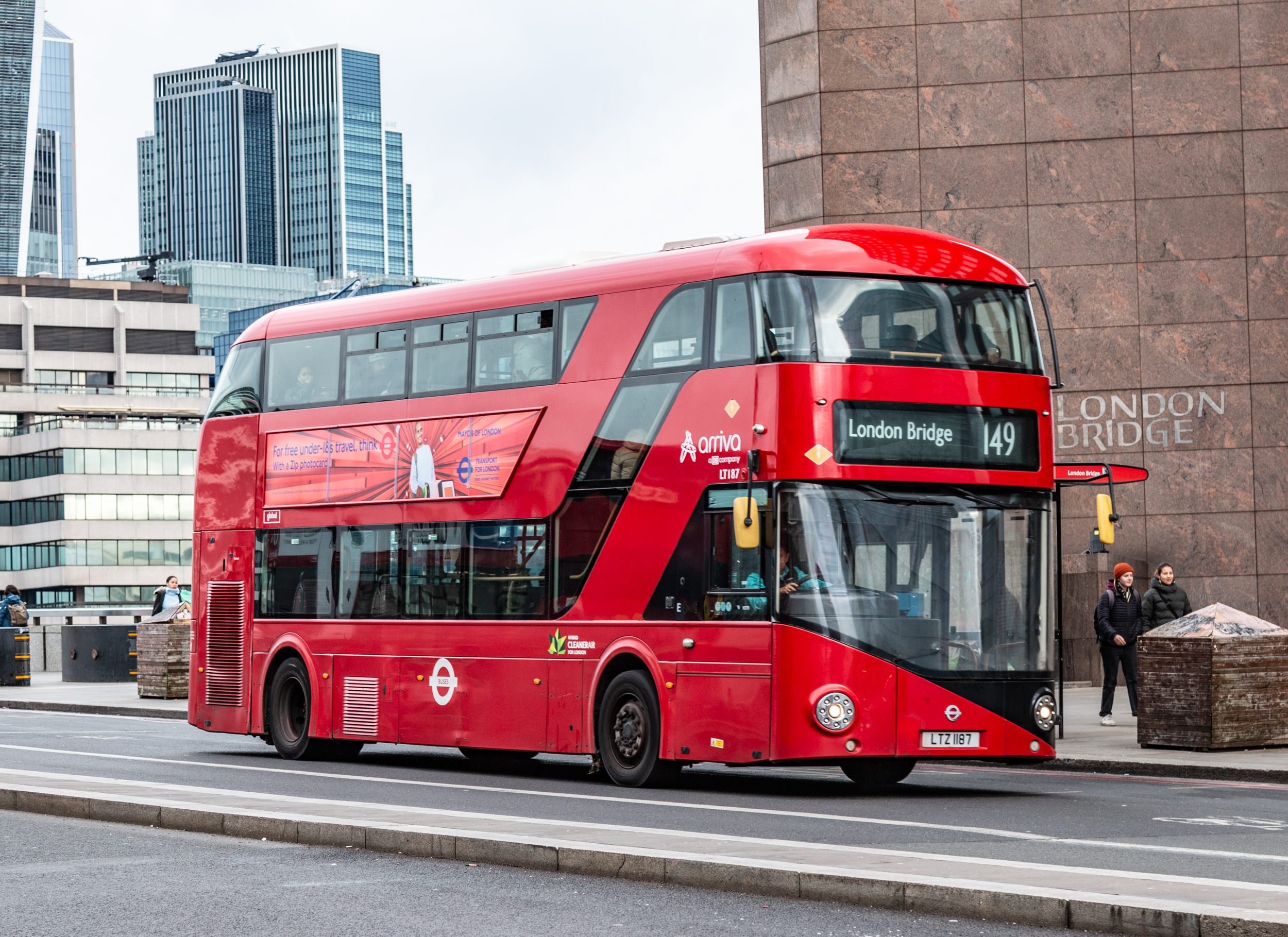
- Arriva London New Routemaster on London Bridge in December 2023

Overview
- Operator: Arriva London
- Garage: Tottenham
- Vehicle: New Routemaster
- Peak vehicle requirement: Day: 30; Night: 10
- Night-time: 24-hour service

Route
- Start: Edmonton Green bus station
- Via: Tottenham; Stamford Hill; Stoke Newington; Dalston; Shoreditch
- End: London Bridge bus station
- Length: 9 miles (14 km)

Service
- Level: 24-hour service
- Frequency: About every 8 minutes
- Journey time: 40-78 minutes
- Operates: 24-hour service

London Buses route 149 is a Transport for London contracted bus route in London, England. Running between Edmonton Green and London Bridge bus stations, it is operated by Arriva London.

== History ==
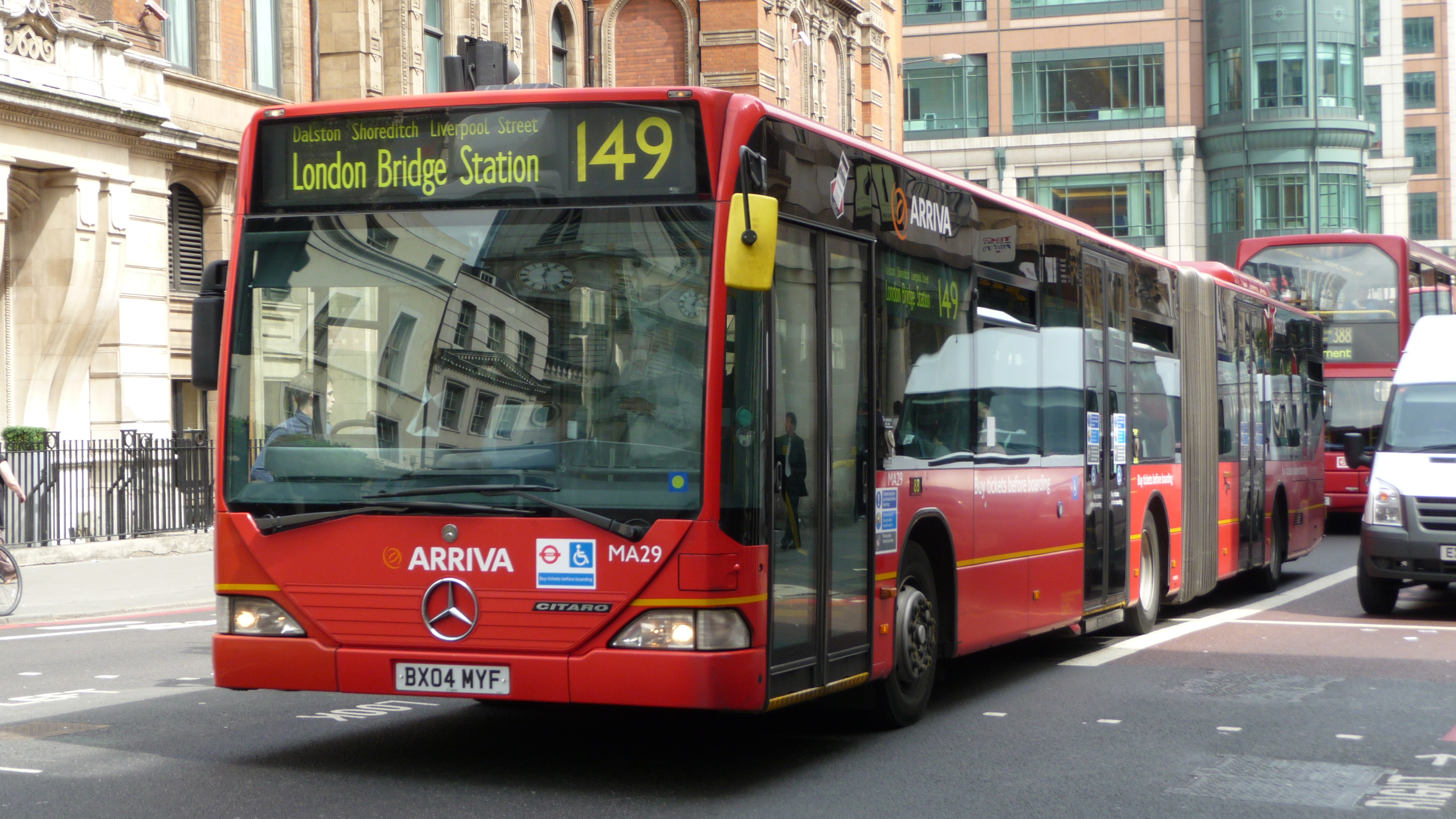
Arriva London Mercedes-Benz O530G on Bishopsgate in 2009

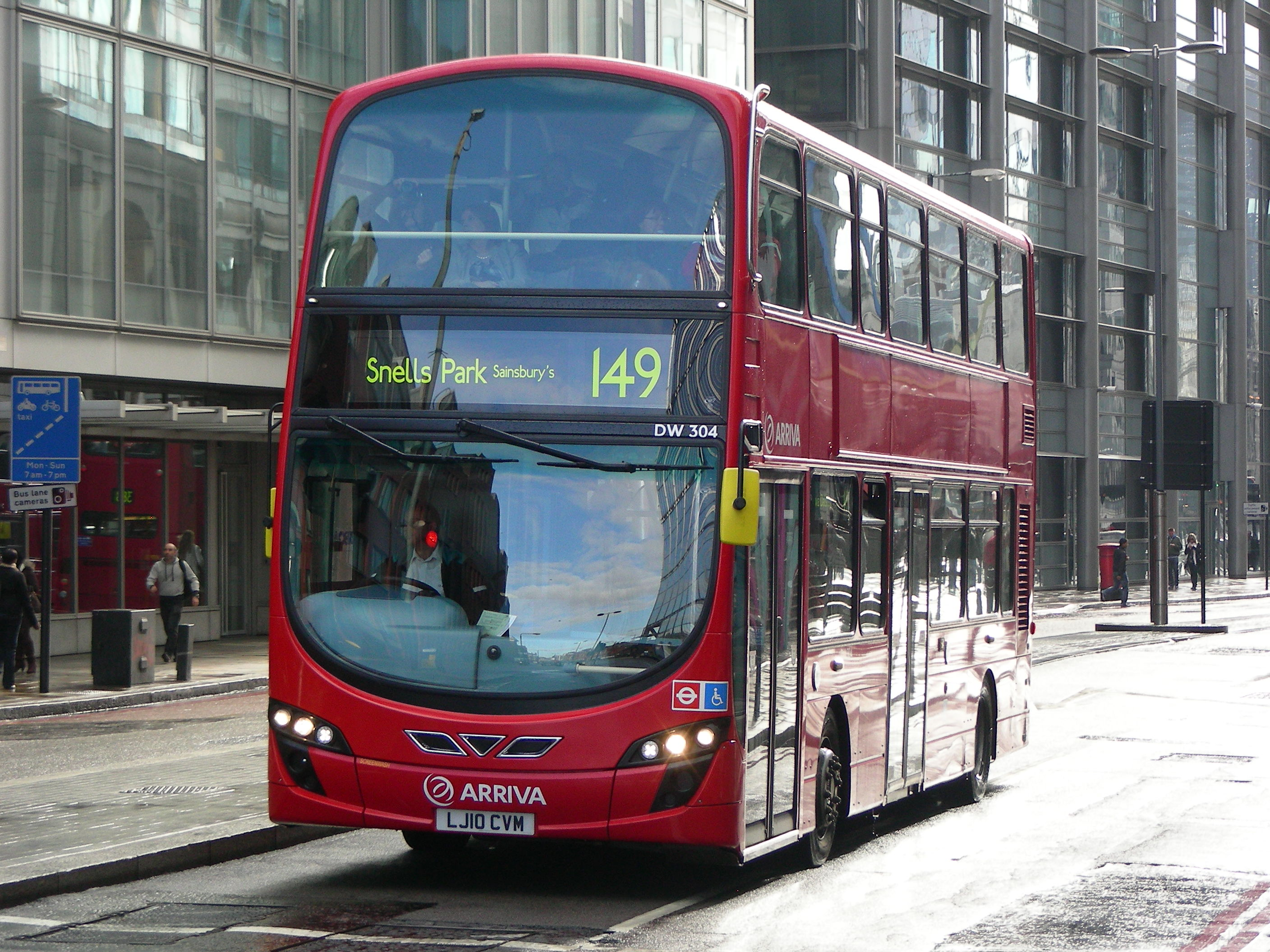
Arriva London Wright Gemini 2 DL bodied VDL DB300 in Shoreditch in 2010

Route 149 was introduced in 1961 to replace trolleybus route 649 between Waltham Cross and Liverpool Street station. In 1968 it was extended on weekdays to Victoria with some peak hour journeys extended from Waltham Cross to Flamstead End via Cheshunt. In 1970 the route was withdrawn north of Ponders End and in 1971 back to Edmonton, although a few peak hour journeys continued to serve Ponders End. Seven years later route 149 was re-extended to Ponders End at all times.

In 1985, it was withdrawn between Waterloo and Victoria, and further cut back to Liverpool Street in 1991 apart from a few early weekday journeys to Mansion House station. In the same year it was extended back to Waterloo during weekday peak hours. In 1998 the route was extended south from Liverpool St station to London Bridge station. The service was converted to an articulated bus operation in 2004 with a fleet of Mercedes-Benz O530G and withdrawn north of Edmonton, with new route 349 taking over.

In 2005, route 149 was subject to intensive bus priority measures along the length of its route. A year later the route was used to test the iBus recorded announcements system to aid visually impaired passengers.

Wright Gemini 2 DL bodied VDL DB300 double deck buses were introduced on 16 October 2010 as part of the Mayor of London's policy to withdraw articulated buses from London. The route was transferred to Tottenham garage and the peak vehicle requirement was increased to 36.

Arriva London has successfully retained route 149 with new contracts starting on 16 October 2010 and 17 October 2015.

New Routemasters were introduced on 17 October 2015. The rear platform remains closed at all times except for when the bus is at bus stops.

It is London's fourth busiest bus route as of 2015/16, having carried 14.1 million passengers.

In 2019, peak service frequency was increased from every eight minutes to every six minutes.

== Crime ==
Route 149 suffers from higher levels of crime than most routes in London. In the 2006-07 financial year the route had the sixth highest levels of reported incidents on the network. This was lower than in the previous year, when it was fifth.

In 2007, the route was highlighted as having extremely high levels of pickpocketing by London Assembly member Jeanette Arnold. Ken Livingstone, then Mayor of London, was called upon to increase policing on the route, but stated that pickpocket activity had in fact decreased between 2005 and 2007.

A vehicle on the route was involved in an accident in Tottenham on 15 September 2009 when a double-decker bus on route 243 crashed into it. The driver and four passengers were injured in the accident, as was the driver of the 243, but there were no serious injuries.

On 27 February 2010, a bus driver working on the route was assaulted by a passenger who had failed to alight at the correct stop. Two weeks earlier a driver on the route had been suspended for assaulting a pedestrian near Monument station.

On 15 October 2015, a man was jailed for throwing a man's walking frame off a bus on the route and shouting racist and Islamophobic abuse at him.

== Current route ==
Route 149 operates via these primary locations:

- Edmonton Green bus station
- Edmonton Green station
- Upper Edmonton
- White Hart Lane station
- Bruce Grove station
- Tottenham High Road
- Seven Sisters station
- South Tottenham station
- Stamford Hill
- Stoke Newington station
- Dalston Kingsland station
- Dalston Junction station
- Haggerston station
- St Leonard's Hospital
- Hoxton station
- Shoreditch High Street station
- Liverpool Street station
- Monument station
- London Bridge bus station for London Bridge station
