= Bernie Grant =

British politician (1944–2000)

- Grant's funeral Order of Service

Member of Parliament for Tottenham
- In office 11 June 1987 – 8 April 2000
- Preceded by: Norman Atkinson
- Succeeded by: David Lammy

Personal details
- Born: Bernard Alexander Montgomery Grant; 17 February 1944 Georgetown, British Guiana
- Died: 8 April 2000 (aged 56) London, England
- Party: Labour
- Spouse: Sharon Grant
- Education: Heriot-Watt University

Bernard Alexander Montgomery Grant (17 February 1944 – 8 April 2000) was a British politician who was the Member of Parliament for Tottenham, London, from 1987 to his death in 2000. He was a member of the Labour Party.

== Biography ==
=== Early years and education ===
Bernie Grant was born in Georgetown, British Guiana, to schoolteacher parents, who in 1963 took up the UK Government's offer to people from the crown colonies to settle in the United Kingdom. In the UK, Grant attended Tottenham Technical College, and went on to take a degree course in mining engineering at Heriot-Watt University in Edinburgh, but did not graduate.

=== Political career ===
In the mid-1960s, he was, for a period, a member of the Socialist Labour League, led by Gerry Healy. This later became known as the Workers Revolutionary Party. He quickly became a trade union official, and moved into politics, becoming a Labour councillor in the London Borough of Haringey in 1978.

When the Conservative government introduced "rate capping", Grant led the rate-capping rebellion in the borough in 1984. This created division in the local Constituency Labour Party, but through this split, Grant became the Borough of Haringey leader in 1985.

Grant was associated with the Socialist Campaign Group, and spoke out against police racism.

As council leader during the 1985 Broadwater Farm riot, in which policeman PC Keith Blakelock was murdered, Grant was brought to national attention when he gave a speech outside Tottenham Town Hall, in which he was widely misquoted as saying "The police were to blame for what happened on Sunday night and what they got was a bloody good hiding" – his actual words were "the youth think they gave the police a bloody good hiding". His comments brought swift denunciation from the Labour Party leadership, and the then Conservative Home Secretary, Douglas Hurd, called him "the high priest of conflict"; several British newspapers also dubbed him "Barmy Bernie". Grant claimed that he was merely explaining to a wider audience what the feeling on the estate was like. He claimed his words had been taken out of context, but offered an apology to the family of PC Blakelock. There is conflicting information over whether Grant condemned the violence of the rioters the following day. To some, Grant was an extremist, yet he supported the prosecution of 45 people subsequently charged with riot and affray.

The controversy did not prevent him from being elected as MP for Tottenham at the 1987 general election, one of the UK's first Black British MPs since the Liberal Peter McLagan in the 19th century, all of them members of the Labour Party Black Sections movement, being elected at the same time as Diane Abbott and Paul Boateng, as well as Britain's first British Asian MP since the 1920s, Keith Vaz. Grant later stood for the deputy leadership of the Labour Party, but was unsuccessful.

In 1989, he established and chaired the Parliamentary Black Caucus, modelled after the Congressional Black Caucus of the United States. The organisation was committed to advancing the opportunities of Britain's ethnic minority communities.

=== African Reparations Movement ===
In 1993, Grant co-founded and chaired the African Reparations Movement (ARM UK) to campaign for the movement for reparations for slavery and racism. ARM UK was formed following the 1993 Abuja Proclamation declared at the First Pan-African Conference on Reparations, in Abuja, Nigeria, convened by the Organisation of African Unity (OAU) and the Nigerian government. On 10 May 1993 Grant tabled a motion in the House of Commons that the House welcomed the proclamation and "calls upon the international community to recognise that the unprecedented moral debt owed to African people has yet to be paid, and urges all those countries who were enriched by enslavement and colonisation to review the case for reparations to be paid to Africa and to Africans in the Diaspora; acknowledges the continuing painful economic and personal consequences of the exploitation of Africa and Africans in the Diaspora and the racism it has generated; and supports the OAU as it intensifies its efforts to pursue the cause of reparations." The motion was sponsored by Grant, Tony Benn, Tony Banks, John Austin-Walker, Harry Barnes, and Gerry Bermingham; an additional 46 Labour Party MPs signed to support the motion, including Jeremy Corbyn. ARM UK, in a "Birmingham Declaration" of 1 January 1994, called upon:

all people of Afrikan origin in the Caribbean, Afrika, Europe, the Americas and elsewhere to support the movement for reparations and join forces with a view to forming a strong united front capable of exposing, confronting and overcoming the psychological, economic and cultural harm inflicted upon us by peoples of European origin.

Grant's approach to reparations included demands for the return of looted African cultural heritage (such as the Benin Bronzes) and that the British government should financially support those who wanted to return to their country of origin.

Grant's final parliamentary contribution (five months before his death) at PMQ's on 24 November 1999, asked Prime Minister Tony Blair to recognise the part that Britain played in the transatlantic slave trade and acknowledging the contribution made to British history by enslaved people.

=== Personal life and death ===
Grant married three times, living with his third wife in Muswell Hill. He was diabetic from his thirties. He died from a heart attack at Middlesex Hospital on 8 April 2000, aged 56. His funeral procession on 18 April passed through Tottenham towards a service at Alexandra Palace, pausing as it passed the Broadwater Farm estate. According to The Guardian's report, "An estimated 3,000 people... turned out to salute the black radical. There were dancers and singers, a Highland piper and African drums. Also present were Home Secretary, Jack Straw, Chris Smith, Culture Secretary, Clare Short, Minister for International Development, and Paul Boateng and Keith Vaz, Britain's most senior BAME ministers."

== Legacy ==
Grant's widow, Sharon, was on the shortlist to succeed him as the official Labour candidate for Tottenham, but was beaten by the 27-year-old David Lammy, who won the by-election in June 2000.

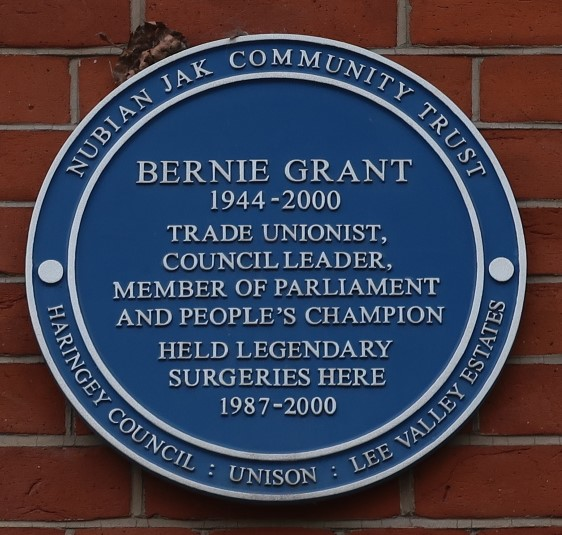
Blue plaque dedicated to Grant at Tottenham Old Town Hall

In September 2007, in Tottenham, Haringey Council opened the Bernie Grant Arts Centre in his name. On Sunday, 28 October 2012, a blue plaque, organised by the Nubian Jak Community Trust, was unveiled at Tottenham Old Town Hall in tribute to Grant. On 5 December 2017, a portrait of Grant was unveiled in Parliament. The portrait was commissioned by the Speaker's Advisory Committee on Works of Art. Drawn in 180 hours using pencil and charcoal by hyper-realist artist Kelvin Okafor, the portrait joined the Parliamentary Art Collection.

In March 2019, the Labour Party launched the Bernie Grant Leadership programme, which was created to train and equip BAME Labour members. Dawn Butler wrote on the launch that "This national programme is about empowering more Black, Asian, minority ethnic members to take on leadership positions in the Labour Party, develop skills and join a network of talented members and community activists across the country", saying that Grant "campaigned tirelessly for the elimination of racism both in Britain and across the world. ... He was a champion of his community, a dedicated constituency MP and has encouraged a generation of BAME leaders."

Grant's archive is held at the Bishopsgate Institute. Much of Grant's life work and community contributions can be found in articles, newspaper clippings at the archives of the George Padmore Institute, an organisation committed to preserving the cultural contributions of Caribbean, African and Asian descent in Britain and Europe.

Parliament of the United Kingdom
Preceded by Norman Atkinson	Member of Parliament for Tottenham; 1987–2000	Succeeded by David Lammy
