= Bruce Grove =

Street and area in Tottenham, London

Coordinates: 51.593°N 0.075°W

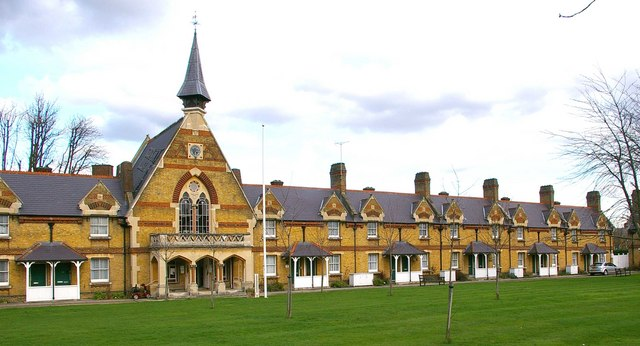
Drapers' Almshouses, Bruce Grove

Bruce Grove is a locality in Tottenham, enclosed by Lordship Recreation Ground, Lordship Lane, Philip Lane, and the High Road. The population of the Bruce Grove ward at the 2011 Census was 14,483. Nearby Bruce Castle was named after Robert the Bruce. When Robert became King of Scotland, Edward I seized his English Estates, including the area then known as Bruce Manor. The area is served by Bruce Grove railway station, from where trains go to Liverpool Street, Enfield Town and Cheshunt.

The neighbourhood dates back to Roman times with Ermine Street (High Rd) and to medieval times with the Swan Public House, but most of the houses were built in the late Victorian or Edwardian Era following the building of the Great Eastern Railway Enfield Branch. 7 Bruce Grove features an English Heritage blue plaque to Luke Howard (1772–1864), a meteorologist who devised a nomenclature system for clouds in 1802. The Bruce Grove area of Tottenham High Road has received a £1m grant from the Heritage Lottery Fund to restore the historic Victorian and Edwardian buildings to their original grandeur under the Bruce Grove Townscape Heritage Initiative (THI) project.
