= Tottenham Town Hall =

Municipal building in London, England

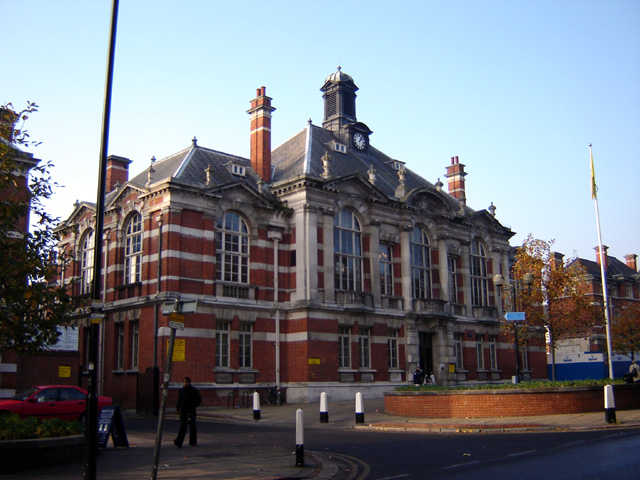
- Tottenham Town Hall

- Shown in Haringey
- 51.5873°N 0.0724°W
- Location: Town Hall Approach Road, Tottenham

History
- Built: 1905

Site notes
- Architect(s): Arnold Taylor and Rutherford Jemmett
- Architectural style: Baroque style

Listed Building – Grade II
- Designated: 9 August 1988
- Reference no.: 1249634

Tottenham Town Hall is a municipal building in Town Hall Approach Road, Tottenham, London. It is a Grade II listed building.

== History ==
In the 19th century, the local board of health met at Bruce Castle. After the area became an urban district in 1895, civic leaders decided to procure purpose-built municipal offices: the site they selected for the new building had previously been occupied by four large residential properties: Eaton House, Wilton House, The Ferns and Hatfield House. They decided that the new municipal offices would be flanked by a fire station to the south and swimming baths to the north both to be built in the same architectural style and at the same time as the municipal offices. A school, to be built to the north of the swimming baths, was added to the scheme a few years later.

The foundation stone for the new facility was laid on 6 October 1904. The building was designed by Arnold Taylor and Rutherford Jemmett in the Baroque style; it was officially opened by the Chairman of the Council, T. H. Camp, on 2 November 1905. The design involved a symmetrical main frontage with seven bays facing onto Town Hall Approach Road; the central section of five bays featured a doorway with a stone surround flanked by Tuscan order pilasters on the ground floor; there were tall rounded-headed windows with Gibbs surround arches flanked with Ionic order columns in the centre and Ionic order pilasters beyond on the first floor; there was a cupola with a clock at roof level. The principal room was the council chamber on the first floor.

The building became the headquarters of the Municipal Borough of Tottenham as "Tottenham Town Hall" when the area secured municipal borough status in 1934. In May 1962, after Tottenham Hotspur won the first FA Cup against Burnley, a victory reception was held at the town hall and Jimmy Greaves held the FA Cup trophy aloft from town hall balcony.

The town hall ceased to be the local seat of government when the enlarged London Borough of Haringey was formed in 1965. In the late 1980s, a memorial to Cynthia Jarrett, whose death in October 1985 was the catalyst for the Broadwater Farm riot, was erected outside the town hall. The building subsequently deteriorated and was placed on the Buildings at Risk Register. An extensive programme of refurbishment works of the building to the designs of BPTW was completed in December 2010. The works included restoration of the council chamber, which was renamed the Moselle Room after the River Moselle which flows through the area. The development also made land available behind the town hall for Newlon Housing Trust to create new affordable homes.

The adjacent swimming baths and the fire station, which both formed part of the original composition, were redeveloped as an arts centre and as a restaurant in 2007 and 2015 respectively.
