= Newlon Housing Trust =

Housing association in London, England

- Formation: 1968
- Type: Housing association
- Location: London, England
- Key people: Ruth Davison (CEO)
- Revenue: £80m (2019)
- Website: www.newlon.org.uk

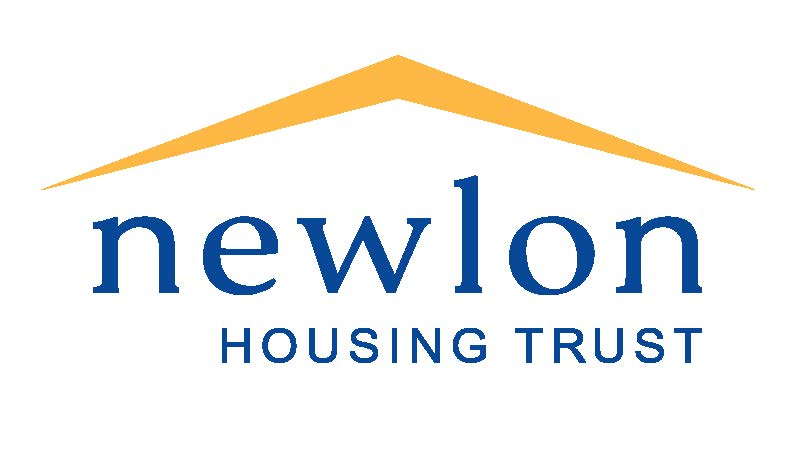

Newlon Housing Trust is a housing association based in London, which owns or manages around 8,000 affordable homes.

== Overview ==
It was established in 1968 when philanthropic members of the New London Synagogue worked together to buy properties that could be rented at affordable rates by members of the local community in need of decent homes.

The organisation has been involved in major regeneration projects, including partnering with Arsenal FC to provides homes as part of the club's move from Highbury, as well as Hale Village in Tottenham.

It has a care and support partner, Outward, which provides support services for older people, people with mental health issues, young people and people with learning disabilities, including a specialised service that supports people on the autism spectrum. Outward also manages a rural retreat at Nutley Edge in East Sussex.

Newlon is a strategic partner with the Greater London Authority.

Awards won by Newlon include Outstanding Contribution to Promoting Home Ownership at the UK Housing Awards, and Best Development Team at the Inside Housing Development Awards.
