= Owen Wood =

16th-century priest

Owen Wood was a sixteenth century priest.

Wood was born in Anglesey and educated at Jesus College, Oxford. He held livings at Llanbeulan, Ewelme and Great Cheverell. He was appointed Dean of Armagh in 1588. He became Archdeacon of Meath in 1595, serving until 1606. He died in 1609.
