= Tottenham High Road =

Street in London, England

Coordinates: 51°36′02″N 0°04′04″W

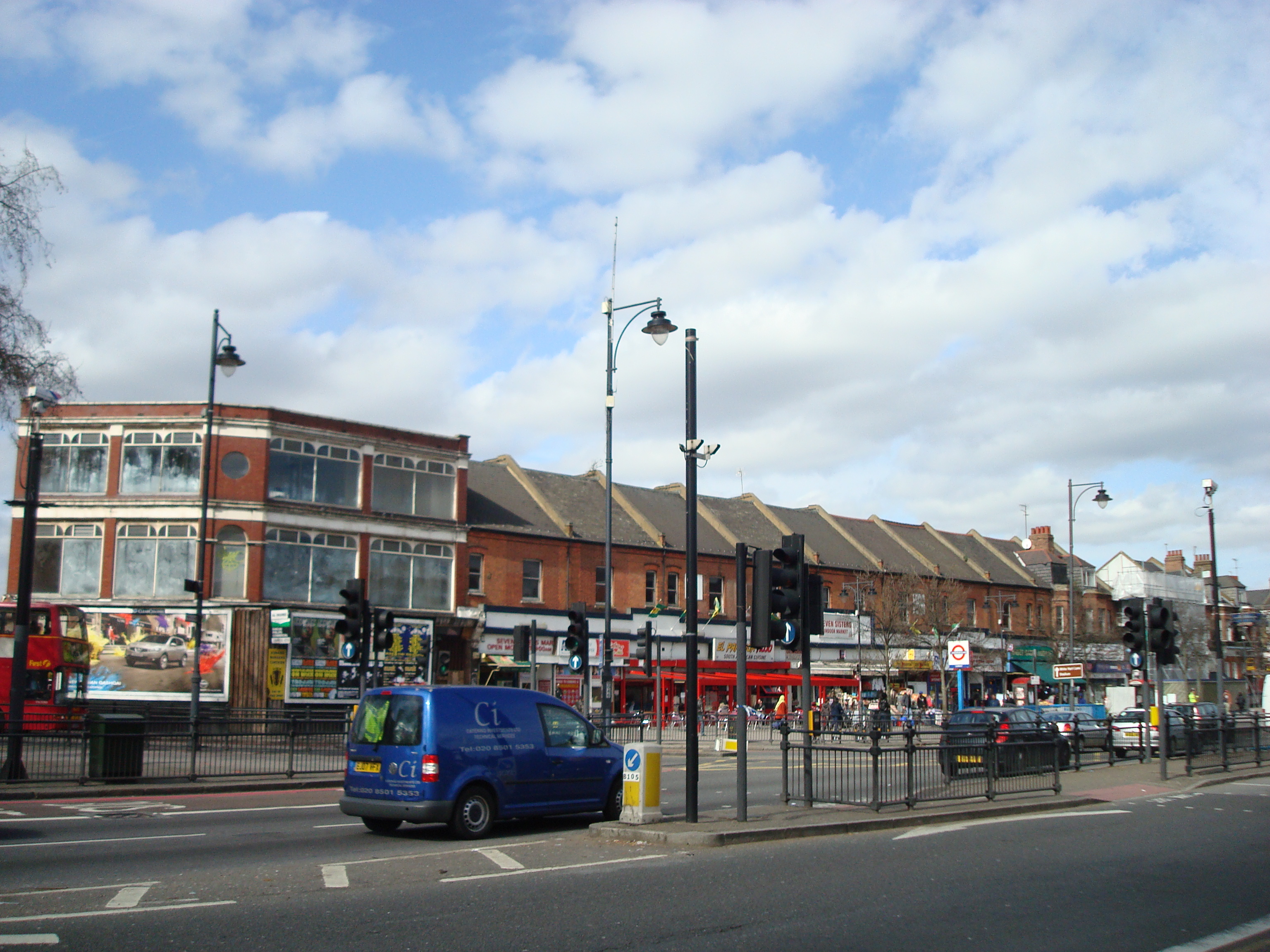
Tottenham High Road in 2010

Tottenham High Road is the main thoroughfare through the district of Tottenham, in the London Borough of Haringey. It runs from Edmonton in the North (where it becomes Fore Street) to Stamford Hill in the South (where the road becomes Stamford Hill). South of Bruce Grove the road is part of the A10; to the north it is part of the A1010. Tottenham High Road passes through the London postcode areas of N17 and N15 and is 2.3 miles (3.7 kilometers) in length.

== History ==
Tottenham High Road follows, for the whole of its length, the course of the erstwhile Roman road, Ermine Street. The road became an important thoroughfare between London and Cambridge attracting inns, almshouses and residential properties to be established at strategic points. By the 16th century large country retreats leased by affluent Londoners could be found on the high road. From 1800-1850 new roads were built connecting to the high road, which provided better accessibility to London, bringing professionals into the area, causing the population to grow rapidly over the proceeding decades. In 1881, North London Tramways Co. opened a tramway from Edmonton to Stamford Hill along Tottenham High Road.

== Route ==
Tottenham High Road starts in Edmonton (further North than this it becomes Fore Street). Travelling South the road meets White Hart Lane with the Tottenham Hotspur Stadium on the East side of the road. The road then forms a junction with Lordship Lane and continues South to meet Bruce Grove, the A10 follows the High road South from here. Further South than this the road passes Tottenham High Cross and continues past Seven Sisters to Stamford Hill where the road becomes known as Stamford Hill.

== See also ==
- Bruce Grove
- Bruce Grove railway station
- Seven Sisters
- Seven Sisters station
