= Stoke Newington and Edmonton Railway =

The Stoke Newington & Edmonton Railway was built by the Great Eastern Railway, under the GER (Metropolitan Station & Railways) Act of 29 July 1864. Construction was delayed due to the financial problems of the GER. Work commenced on the Hackney Downs to Lower Edmonton section in 1870. The section from Bethnal Green Junction to Stoke Newington with stations at Cambridge Heath, London Fields, Hackney Downs, Rectory Road, and Stoke Newington opened on 27 May 1872. The remainder opened on 22 July 1872 with stations at Stamford Hill, Seven Sisters, Bruce Grove, White Hart Lane, Silver Street, and Edmonton, then to Edmonton Green. The connection with the original branch line to Enfield Town north of Edmonton Green station was opened on 1 August 1872.
