= Silver Street railway station =

Railway station in north London, England

Silver Street
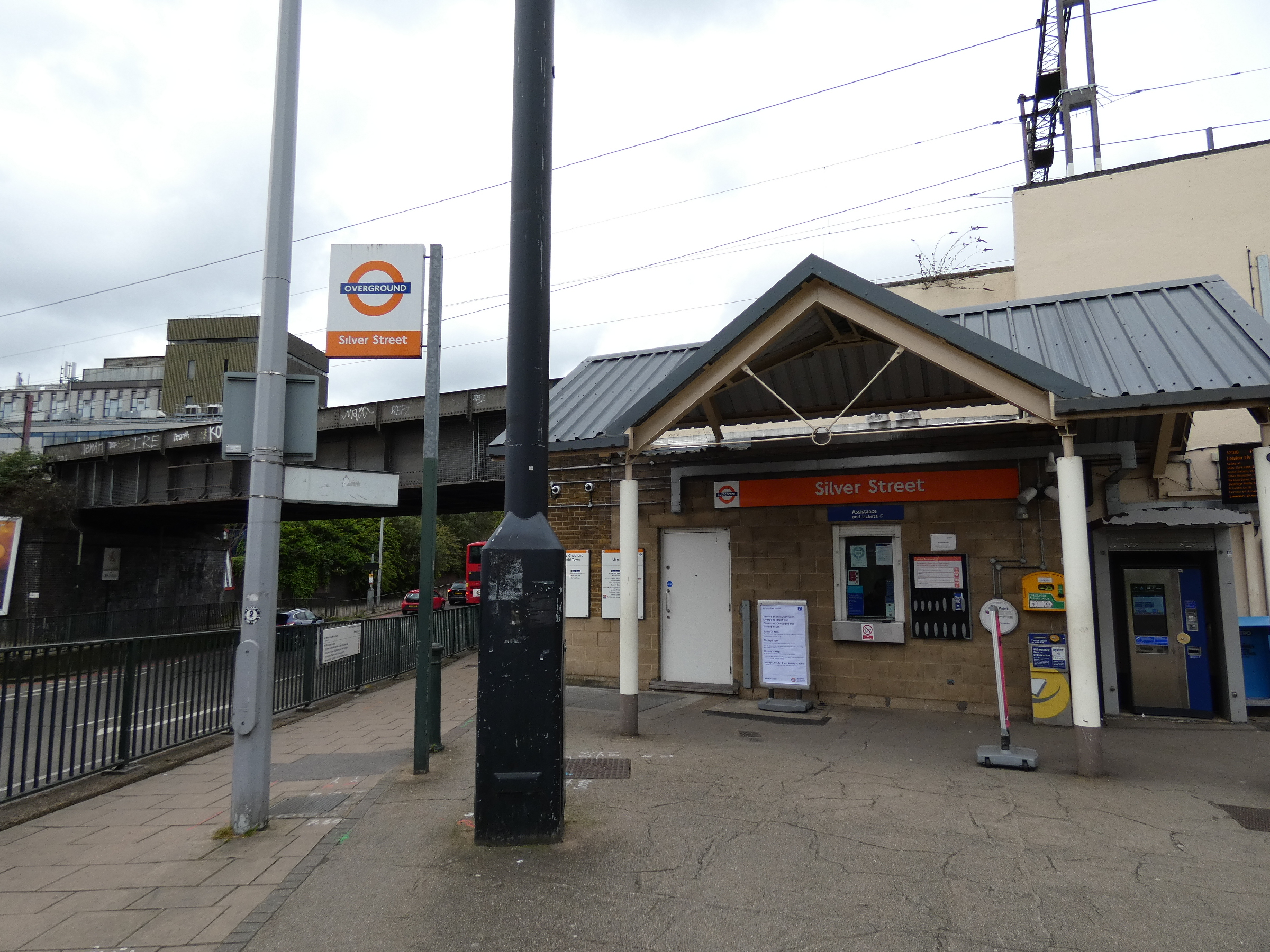
- Silver Street Station in April 2024
- Interactive map of Silver Street

General information
- Location: Edmonton
- Local authority: London Borough of Enfield
- Managed by: London Overground
- Station code: SLV
- DfT category: D
- Number of platforms: 2
- Fare zone: 4

National Rail annual entry and exit
- 2020–21: ▼0.674 million
- 2021–22: ▲1.267 million
- 2022–23: ▲1.480 million
- 2023–24: ▲2.032 million
- 2024–25: ▲2.136 million

Railway companies
- Original company: Great Eastern Railway
- Pre-grouping: Great Eastern Railway
- Post-grouping: London and North Eastern Railway

Key dates
- 22 July 1872: Station opened

Other information
- External links: Departures; Facilities
- Coordinates: 51.615°N 0.067°W

Silver Street is a station on the Weaver line of the London Overground, located in Edmonton in the London Borough of Enfield, north London. It is 7 miles 75 chains (12.8 km) down the line from London Liverpool Street and is situated between White Hart Lane and Edmonton Green stations. Its three-letter station code is SLV and it is in London fare zone 4.

== Description ==
Silver Street station is located on a long straight section of elevated track, on the Lea Valley lines from Liverpool Street to Cheshunt and Enfield Town. Looking north, the platforms at Edmonton Green can be seen (there is just 50 chains (1.0 km) between the two stops) whilst looking south, trains leaving White Hart Lane are seen almost immediately as they leave that station (it being only 64 chains (1.3 km) from Silver Street).

The station takes its name from the street so-called which is recorded thus c. 1630 and which possibly alludes to silversmiths living in the area at that time or before. The street used to include the part of Sterling Way which now runs past the station.

== History ==
Silver Street was originally a stop on the Stoke Newington & Edmonton Railway and opened on 22 July 1872.

Several changes were made to Silver Street station in the early 1980s. Two wooden covered staircases leading up to the platforms were replaced by open-air concrete staircases. The northbound platform roof was removed and replaced with a simple brick shelter.

A fire on the London-bound platforms in the 1990s damaged much of the original roof. A new modern structure was put in its place alongside the remaining undamaged portion.

The Fore Street tunnel section of the North Circular Road was built beneath the station during the 1990s without any disruption to service. At this time, a new ticket hall was constructed on the eastern side of the station.

In 2015 the station and all services that call transferred from Abellio Greater Anglia operation to become part of the London Overground network. Silver Street was added to the Tube map at the same time.

== Services ==
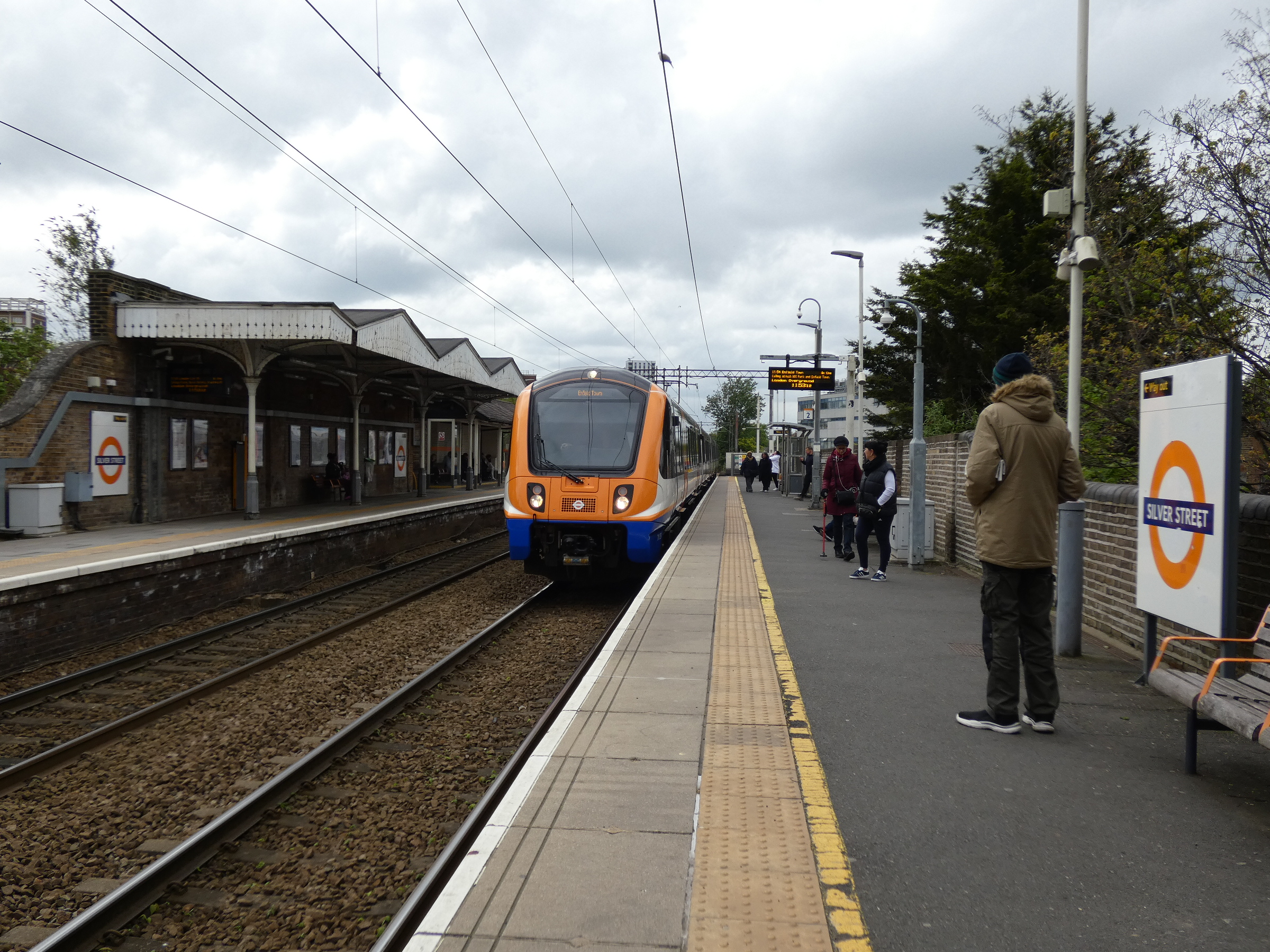
A London Overground train approaching the northbound platform at Silver Street Station in April 2024

All services at Silver Street are operated as part of the Weaver line of the London Overground using Class 710 EMUs.

The typical off-peak service in trains per hour is:

- 4 tph to London Liverpool Street
- 2 tph to Cheshunt
- 2 tph to Enfield Town

Additional services call at the station during weekday peak hours, when the Enfield Town service frequency is doubled to 4 tph.

| Preceding station | London Overground | Following station |
|---|---|---|
| White Hart Lane towards Liverpool Street | Weaver line Lea Valley lines | Edmonton Green towards Cheshunt or Enfield Town |

== Connections ==
London Buses routes 34, 102, 144, 444, 456, 491 and SL1 serve the station.
