= Percy Ingle =

Baker and retailer founded in 1954

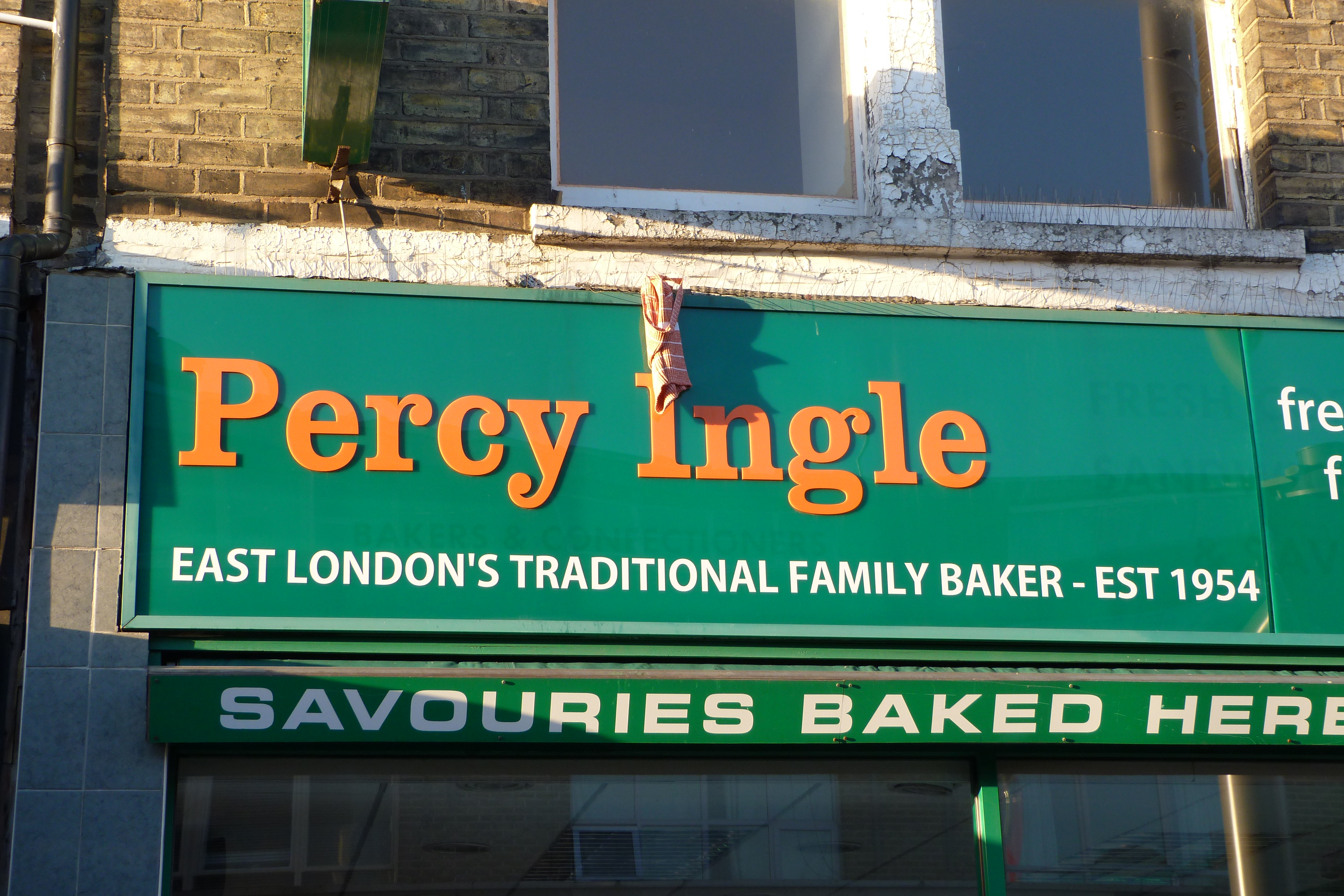
Percy Ingle shop in Walthamstow, East London

Percy Ingle was a retail bakery founded in east London in 1954, by Percy Ingle. The chain had over 50 outlets in London and Essex.

As of 2010, Michael and Paul Ingle, grandsons of the founder, were running the company.

On 22 June 2020, the Newham Recorder reported that the bakery was "due to close all its stores after 66 years". The paper reported that "head office has confirmed the closure".
