= Bruce Grove railway station =

London Overground station

Bruce Grove
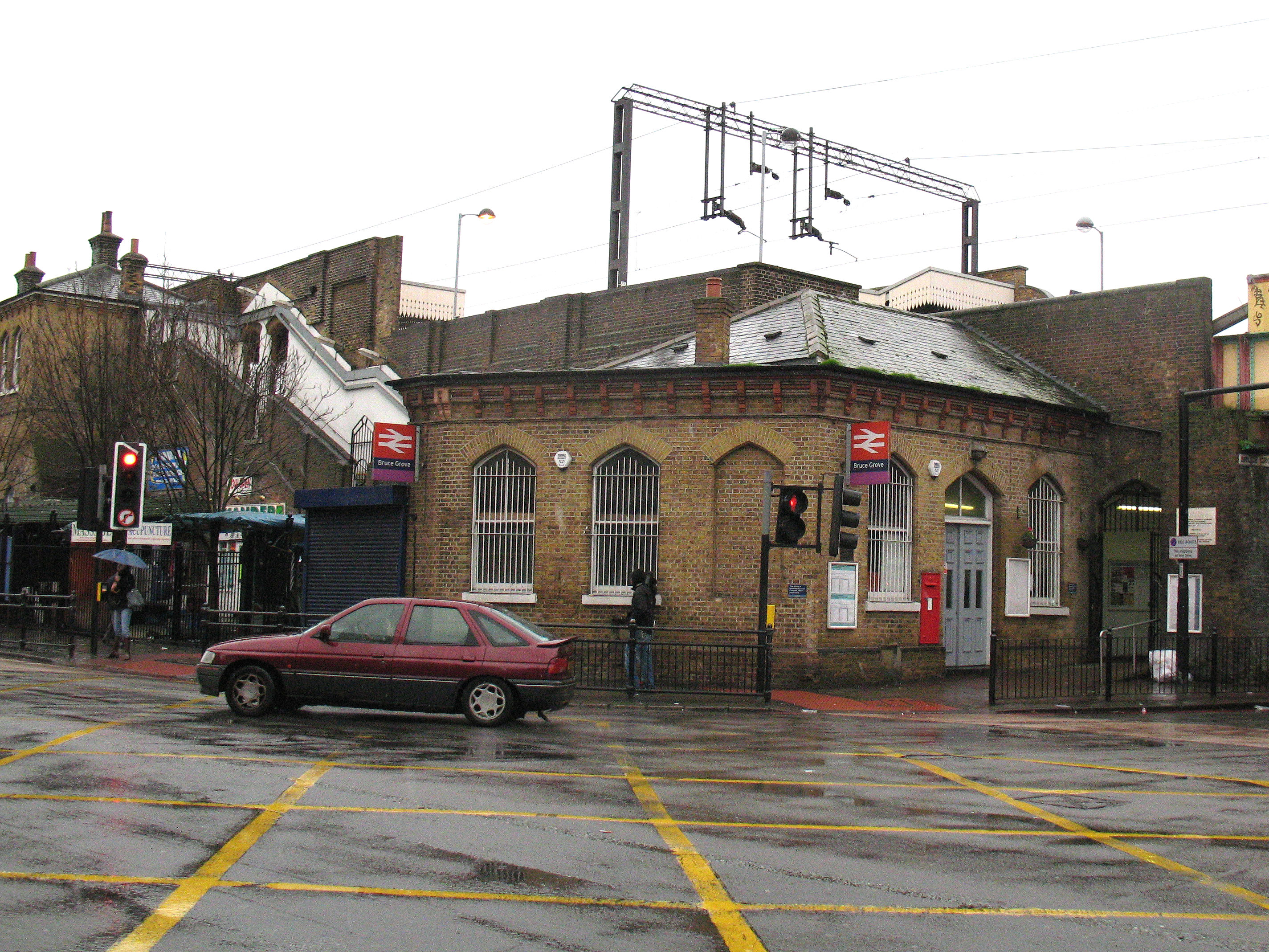
- The station entrance in January 2008
- Interactive map of Bruce Grove

General information
- Location: Tottenham
- Local authority: London Borough of Haringey
- Managed by: London Overground
- Station code: BCV
- DfT category: E
- Number of platforms: 2
- Fare zone: 3

National Rail annual entry and exit
- 2020–21: ▼0.407 million
- 2021–22: ▲0.832 million
- 2022–23: ▲0.999 million
- 2023–24: ▲1.388 million
- 2024–25: ▼1.365 million

Key dates
- 22 July 1872: Opened

Other information
- External links: Departures; Facilities
- Coordinates: 51.594°N 0.0704°W

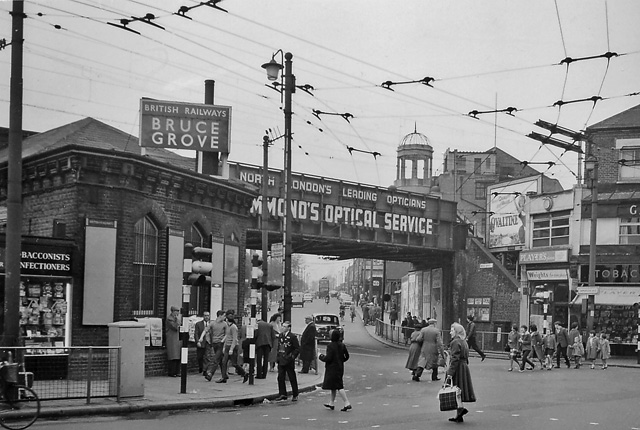
The station approach in April 1961

Bruce Grove is a station on the Weaver line of the London Overground, located in central Tottenham in the London Borough of Haringey, north London. It is 6 miles 28 chains (10.2 km) down the line from London Liverpool Street and is situated between Seven Sisters and White Hart Lane stations. Its three-letter station code is BCV and it is in London fare zone 3.

== History ==
Bruce Grove was originally a stop on the Stoke Newington & Edmonton Railway and opened on 22 July 1872. Today it is on the Seven Sisters branch of the Lea Valley lines and sees four Weaver line trains per hour to Liverpool Street and two to either Cheshunt or Enfield Town. The station is not far from Bruce Castle and takes its name from a road forming part of the A10.

In the early 1980s several changes were made to the appearance of the station. The wooden covered staircases to both platforms were replaced by open-air concrete staircases. The London-bound platform roof was shortened and the waiting rooms boarded up. The northbound roof opposite (which was identical) was completely removed and a small shelter built of brick was installed in its place. This shelter lasted for nearly 20 years before it was demolished and a new roof, built in the style of the original, although much shorter, was constructed giving the illusion of original authenticity to the station. Haringey council funded the work and the station is considered a site of historic interest in the locality.

In May 2015 the station and all services that call there transferred from Abellio Greater Anglia to become part of the London Overground network. In November 2015 a major facelift for the station was announced.

In 2023 restoration work on the disused waiting rooms was completed, creating a new waiting room and a community space.

== Services ==
All services at Bruce Grove are operated as part of the Weaver line of the London Overground using Class 710 EMUs.

The typical off-peak and weekend service in trains per hour is:

- 4 tph to London Liverpool Street
- 2 tph to Cheshunt
- 2 tph to Enfield Town

The service increases to 4 tph each way to and from Enfield Town during weekday peak hours to give 6 tph to and from Liverpool Street.

Preceding station	London Overground	Following station
Seven Sisters towards Liverpool Street	Weaver line Lea Valley lines	White Hart Lane towards Cheshunt or Enfield Town

== Connections ==
London Buses routes 123, 149, 243, 259, 279, 318, 341, 476 and W4 and night route N279 serve the station.
