= Pitsea railway station =

Railway station in Essex, England

Pitsea
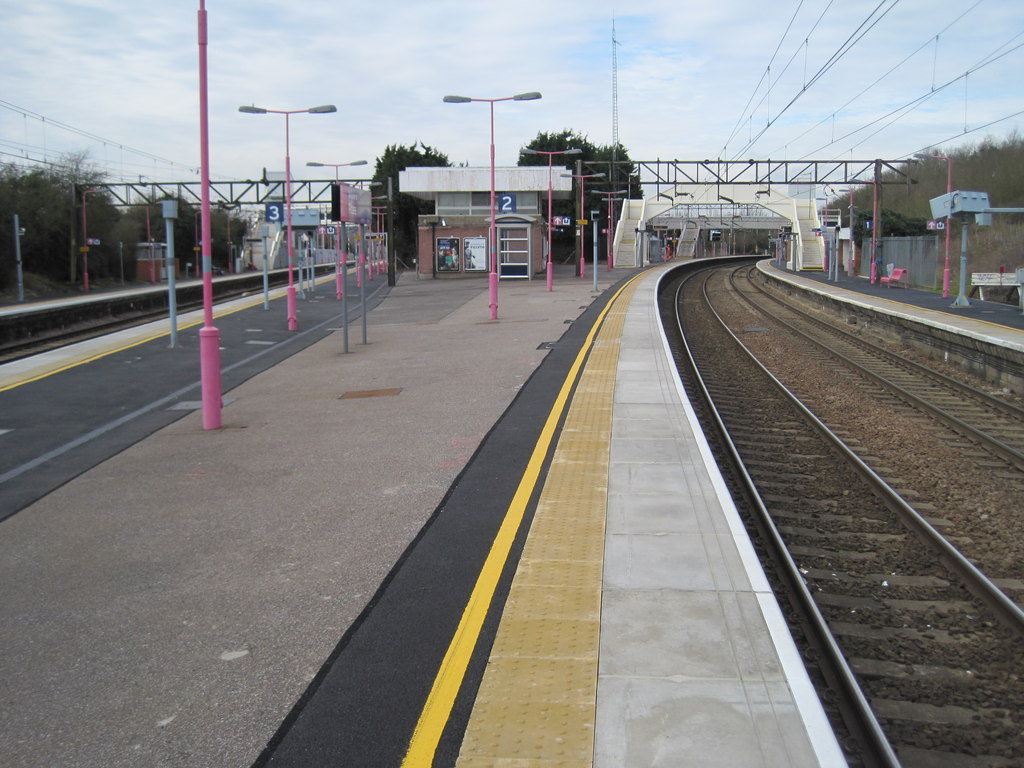

General information
- Location: Pitsea, Borough of Basildon, England
- Coordinates: 51.560°N 0.506°E
- Grid reference: TQ738875
- Manager: c2c
- Platforms: 4

Other information
- Station code: PSE
- Classification: DfT category C2

History
- Original company: London, Tilbury and Southend Railway
- Pre-grouping: Midland Railway
- Post-grouping: London, Midland and Scottish Railway

Key dates
- 1 July 1855: Opened as Pitsea
- 1 June 1888: Resited
- 18 July 1932: Renamed Pitsea for Vange
- December 1952: Renamed Pitsea

Passengers
- 2020/21: ▼0.496 million
- Interchange: ▼94,956
- 2021/22: ▲0.934 million
- Interchange: ▲0.163 million
- 2022/23: ▲1.060 million
- Interchange: ▲0.199 million
- 2023/24: ▲1.086 million
- Interchange: ▼0.195 million
- 2024/25: ▲1.144 million
- Interchange: ▼0.192 million
Location
Notes
- Passenger statistics from the Office of Rail and Road

Pitsea railway station serves the town of Pitsea, in the borough of Basildon, Essex, England. It is situated at a junction on the London, Tilbury and Southend line, where a loop via Grays rejoins the main line via Basildon. Down the main line, it is 26 miles 42 chains (26.5 mi; 42.7 km) from London Fenchurch Street; via the loop, it is 32 miles 37 chains (32.5 mi; 52.2 km) from Fenchurch Street. The station and all trains serving it are operated by c2c.

The station lies immediately south of the A13 road, adjacent to a level crossing which gives the main road access to the marshes area south of Pitsea and Basildon. The station is the closest for Wat Tyler Country Park which is 0.6 mi (1 km) away down Pitsea Hall Lane.

== History ==
=== Early years (1855–1912) ===
Initial plans for the London, Tilbury and Southend Railway(LT&SR) identified a station at Vange, located about 1.5 mi (2.4 km) towards Stanford-le-Hope, rather than Pitsea as a potential station for the area. The station would have been located near Fobbing Level Crossing and land was acquired there. It was never built because the townsfolk of Wickford, 5 mi (8 km) away, wanted a station nearer their town and Pitsea was chosen instead. When the Great Eastern Railway line to Southend Victoria opened in 1896, Wickford got its own station.

Pitsea was opened in 1855 by the LT&SR as part of their main line from London to Southend, via Tilbury Riverside.

By 1855, construction of the line had reached Stanford-le-Hope, which operated as a temporary terminus whilst the line to Southend was still under construction. Services then operated via Tilbury, Barking and Stratford,where a portion to Bishopsgate was detached, to London Fenchurch Street. A new direct line linking Barking with Gas Factory Junction (Bow) saw services no longer serving Stratford and reduced journey times from Pitsea to central London.

Since the railway opened, Southend had seen its population grow and there was pressure to build a more direct route from Barking to Upminster to Pitsea. Construction began in 1883 and the line opened through to Pitsea on 1 June 1888. The original station was slightly to the south and was replaced by a new station on an adjacent site immediately west of the new junction, when the new line from Barking fully opened.

At Pitsea, a large retaining wall was built to support the hill side, on which the 13th-century church of St. Michael stood, and two new platforms provided.

A storm on 1 August 1888 caused a temporary closure of the new line until 1 October. The following day, flooding on the Tilbury line saw the service suspended for six days, meaning Southend had no railway service at all.

=== Midland Railway (1912–22) ===
In 1912, the Midland Railway bought the LT&SR on 7 August 1912; Pitsea became a Midland Railway station.

=== London Midland & Scottish (1923–47) ===
Following the Railways Act 1921, the station became the responsibility of the London Midland and Scottish (LMS) Railway from 1 January 1923.

The station was renamed Pitsea for Vange in 1932, but reverted to its original name of Pitsea in 1952. Examination of photographs from the period see the name Pitsea Junction displayed on the station nameboards, although it was only displayed as Pitsea as Vange was displayed on a smaller nameboard beneath.

Just after World War II started in September 1939, the passenger service was reduced as a wartime economy measure.

=== The nationalised years (1948–94) ===
Following nationalisation of Britain's railways in 1948, the station transferred under British Railways to the London Midland Region. On 20 February 1949, the whole LTS line was transferred to the Eastern Region, yet despite the organisational changes, the old LTSR still was a distinctive system operated by former LTS and LMS steam locomotives until electrification.

In the 1950s, the station nameboards were supplemented by Welcome to Basildon boards; the new town did not get its own station until 1974.

The catastrophic North Sea flood of 1953 flooded parts of the LTS line on 1 February 1953, including the line west of Pitsea between Benfleet and Leigh-on-Sea, and between Tilbury Riverside and Low Street. Main line services terminated at Benfleet during this period. The Tilbury line was restored on 9 February and full main line services resumed on 19 February.

During the late 1950s, the LTS was electrified and resignalled; a number of changes were made at Pitsea in 1956/7, including extending all platforms for 12-car operation. This saw the closure of the bay platform between the platforms. An electrical control room was built behind platform 4 for control and monitoring of the power supply.

A full electric timetable started operating in June 1962, which was worked primarily by Class 302 electric multiple units. A new station building was provided in 1965 to replace the rundown 1881 structure.

The LTS line and Pitsea station became part of the London and South Eastern sector of British Rail in 1982; in June 1986, this was rebranded as Network SouthEast. With the Conservative government of the early 1990s looking to privatise the railways, the operation of the passenger train service was put under the control of a Train Operating Unit.

=== The privatised era (1994–2025) ===
On privatisation in 1994, infrastructure ownership passed to Railtrack and Prism Rail took over operations of the franchise, marketing the route as LTS Rail. Prism Rail was bought out by National Express in 2000 and the line was rebranded as c2c in 2002. Ownership of the infrastructure passed to Network Rail in 2002.

National Express sold the operation of the franchise to Trenitalia in 2017. Private operation of the London, Tilbury and Southend line by Trenitalia c2c ceased on 20 July 2025, with the new publicly-owned operator c2c taking over.

=== Former services ===
In the November 1856 timetable, the station was served by four trains per day operating from Fenchurch to Tilbury Riverside, where the train reversed; it continued onto Pitsea and terminating at Southend. Similarly four trains operated in the other direction.

Services via Upminster commenced on 1 June 1888, but the focus and revenue for the LT&SR was on the Tilbury service. About half of the Southend via Tilbury trains were diverted to use the new link; a number of Fenchurch Street to Pitsea via Laindon services ran, but the connections to Southend were poor or non-existent. In the July 1889 timetable, there were 15 trains per day using the link; albeit one, the 5.45 p.m. Fenchurch Street - Southend express, called at Pitsea. The problem was there was insufficient patronage at Southend to support both routes, so both ended up with an inadequate service.

In the December 1895 timetable, the service was nine trains on a weekday (Monday to Saturday), noting that fewer passenger trains used to run in the winter. The first three down services terminated at Pitsea, so passengers would have change to a service that had come via Tilbury. Services to/from Tilbury consisted of nine down and nine up services on Mondays to Saturdays, with three each way on Sundays.

The standard off-peak service to Pitsea via Tilbury in June 1962, the first all electric service, was two trains in each direction on both lines

== Design ==
The original station, opened in 1855, was located south of the existing station with two platforms and north of Pitsea Hall Lane level crossing. The timber station building was on the down side of the line.

With the building and opening of a new route from Barking via Upminster, the original station was replaced in June 1881 by a new structure comprising four platforms. A fifth was added in the 1930s for terminating trains via Upminster, but this was removed in the 1950s. It was north of the original station, although the platforms of the new and old station overlapped.

The station building was on the remains of a hillock and footbridges linked that to the platforms which were on lower ground.

A new station building was opened in October 2005. Derek Twigg, rail minister, attended for the ribbon cutting in November 2005.

== Goods ==
The goods yard was located south of the first station site and its loop extended around the back of the down platform. When the junction station opened in 1881 the yard was relaid with a run round loop, head shunt, a larger goods shed and cattle pens.

In the September 1962 timetable the goods yard was served by weekday 1.25.a.m. Ripple Lane to Shoeburyness and 12.50 a.m Southend to Ripple Lane goods trains in the September 1962 freight working timetable.

The goods yard closed on 5 June 1967.

In 1976, a siding was installed for Foster Yeoman services on the site of the goods yard. It is not known when this traffic ceased, but the siding has since been lifted.

== Signalling ==
The first station had a signal box which was replaced in 1881 when the new junction and main line were opened. The structure was located on the up side of the line immediately south of the junction. A new engine spur was laid in 1934 to enable locomotives to run round their trans without interfering with services on the main line. The 1881 box was in the way so it was demolished and a new box provided just to the south of it.

With the switch from semaphore signalling to colour light signalling in the late 1950s a new panel box covering the area was opened in 1960 and this was located at the Southend end of platforms 2 and 3. This opened on 23 June 1960 and interfaced with a number of manual boxes, until they were abolished in the following years.

This box operated until 1996 when signalling for the entire London, Tilbury and Southend was taken over by the Upminster signalling centre.

== Layout and facilities ==
The platforms serve:

1. - Fenchurch Street to Shoeburyness via Basildon
2. - Shoeburyness to Fenchurch Street via Basildon
3. - Fenchurch Street to Southend via Tilbury
4. - Southend - Fenchurch Street via Tilbury.

The building houses customer toilets and a retail unit, withfour automatic ticket gates. The ticket office has two serving positions and uses the Tribute issuing system; outside this is a self-service ticket machine.

== Services ==
The typical Monday to Friday off-peak service in trains per hour (tph) is:

- 2 tph westbound to London Fenchurch Street, via Basildon
- 2 tph westbound to London Fenchurch Street, via Tilbury Town and Ockendon
- 2 tph eastbound to Shoeburyness
- 2 tph eastbound to Southend Central.

Preceding station	National Rail	Following station
Basildon	c2c London, Tilbury and Southend line	Benfleet
Stanford-le-Hope	c2c London, Tilbury and Southend line	Benfleet
