= Southend East railway station =

Railway station in Essex, England

Southend East
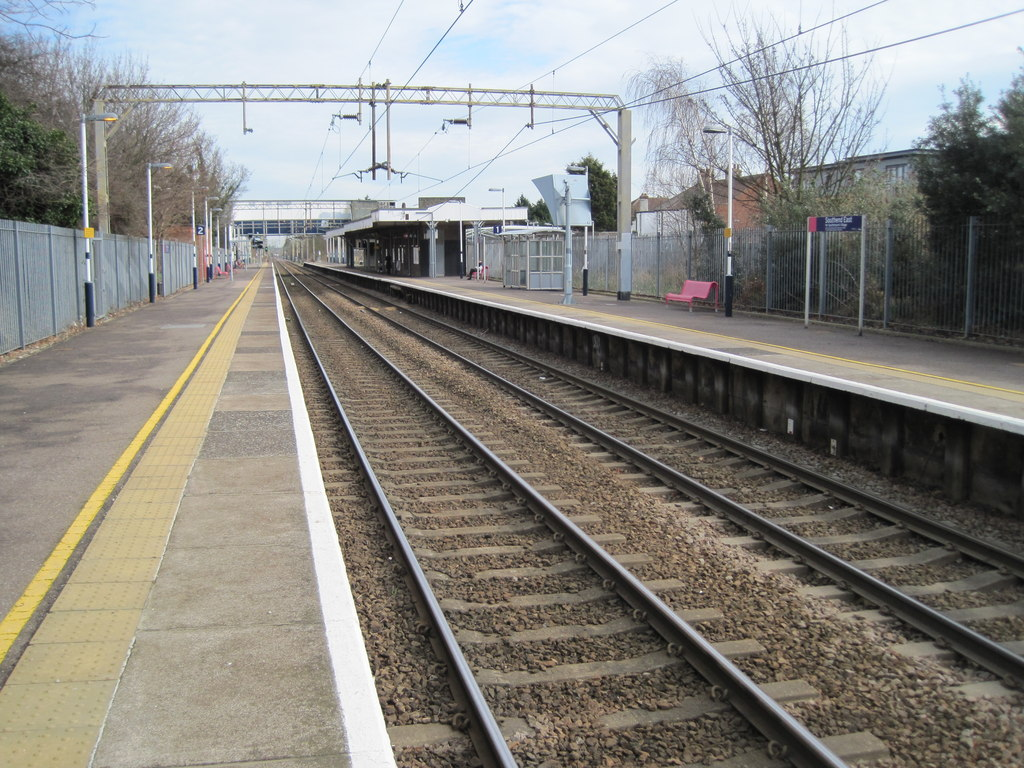

General information
- Location: Southend-on-Sea, City of Southend-on-Sea; England
- Coordinates: 51°32′20″N 0°43′54″E
- Grid reference: TQ894857
- Manager: c2c
- Platforms: 2

Other information
- Station code: SOE
- Classification: DfT category D

History
- Original company: London, Midland and Scottish Railway
- Post-grouping: London, Midland and Scottish Railway

Key dates
- 18 July 1932: Opened as Southend East
- 1 May 1949: Renamed Southend-on-Sea East
- 20 February 1969: Renamed Southend East

Passengers
- 2020/21: ▼0.514 million
- 2021/22: ▲1.011 million
- 2022/23: ▲1.158 million
- 2023/24: ▲1.160 million
- 2024/25: ▲1.272 million
Location
Notes
- Passenger statistics from the Office of Rail and Road

Southend East railway station is on the London, Tilbury and Southend line, serving the Southchurch area to the east of Southend-on-Sea, Essex. It is 36 miles 49 chains (58.9 km) down the main line from London Fenchurch Street via Basildon and it is situated between Southend Central to the west and Thorpe Bay to the east. Its three-letter station code is SOE.

It was opened in 1932. There is no step-free access available on the Shoeburyness bound platform. The station and all trains serving it are currently operated by c2c.

== History ==
=== London, Tilbury and Southend (1884–1922) ===
The railway through the site was opened on 1884 when the London Tilbury and Southend Railway was extended eastwards from Southend to Shoeburyness.

Because of increased traffic, an intermediate block signal block called Southend East was installed in 1896 on the down side east of Southend station. As central Southend developed and the resort expanded it became clear that better goods facilities would be required, so a new goods yard was provided on the down side just to the east of the signal box in 1907. Southend was a popular seaside resort for Londoners and additional trains were run in summer and bank holidays. To cater for these new carriage sidings were laid on the down side west of the site in 1910.

In 1912 the LT&SR was taken over by the Midland Railway and following the Railways Act 1921 the Midland Railway amalgamated with several other railways on 1 January 1923 to create the London Midland and Scottish Railway (LMS).

=== London Midland and Scottish Railway (1923–1947) ===
The station was opened by the London Midland and Scottish Railway (LMS) on 28 March 1932 for excursion traffic only with three platforms supplied on the Up Main and two platforms on a loop to the south also on the up side of the layout. A new signal box named Southend East was provided with the 1896 signal box being renamed Southend Sidings. The opening day was marred by a minor derailment and according to local newspaper reports usage was fairly low. In early 1933 a fourth platform was supplied on the Down Main to better cater for down stopping trains. The stations use as an excursion station seems to have been limited and the excursion platforms were used for a few originating/terminating trains during the weekday peaks.

=== British Railways (1948–1994) ===
After nationalisation on 1 January 1948 the line became part of British Railways London Midland Region but on 20 February 1949 the whole LTS line was transferred to the Eastern Region, yet despite the organisational changes, the old LTSR still was a distinctive system operated by former LTS and LMS locomotives until electrification. On 1 May of the same year the station was named to Southend-on-Sea East.

The area was re-signalled in 1960 prior to electrification in 1961. From re-signalling the signal box was only operational when platforms 1 and 2 were in use. The goods yard was taken out of use on 5 December 1967.

The station was renamed Southend East in 1969. From 1969 to 1981 platform 1 was used as the Southend Area parcels concentration depot. Once this traffic ceased there was no operational reason for platforms 1 and 2 to be retained and all connections were removed on 10 January 1982 and the signal box was never operated again.

The main booking office and station building closed in 1969 being replaced by a smaller office on the former platform 4 (now platform 2). In 1986 the route was transferred to the Network SouthEast sector of British Rail. During this period, it was known as Network SouthEast's "misery line".

=== Privatisation era (1994–2025) ===
On privatisation in 1996, infrastructure ownership passed to Railtrack and Prism Rail took over operations of the franchise, marketing the route as LTS Rail. Ownership passed to Network Rail in 2002. Prism Rail were bought out by National Express in 2000 and in 2002 the line was rebranded as c2c. National Express sold the operation of the franchise to Trenitalia in 2017.

The main building was demolished in 2003.

The station and all trains serving it are currently operated by c2c.

Private operation of the London, Tilbury and Southend line by Trenitalia c2c ceased on 20 July 2025, with the new publicly owned operator c2c taking over.

== Design ==
Southend East has two through platforms. Platform 1 is typically for westbound trains towards London Fenchurch Street and platform 2 is for eastbound trains towards Shoeburyness; there is one disused platform.

In April 2006, signs were erected with the label "Southend East for Southchurch Village" to better reflect its geographical location in the Southchurch area of Southend.

During 2006, a £425,000 refurbishment programme was completed at the station, providing level access to the London-bound platform, as well as new toilets, baby-changing facilities, a redecorated waiting room with CCTV, and a self-service ticket machine.

The former parcels depot, which handled mainly credit-card post from the nearby Access site, was demolished and replaced with housing, the relevant platforms being infilled and paved over to provide a larger 'up' platform area.

A ticket office is located adjacent to platform 1. It was completed in 2011 replacing the previous ticket office located adjacent to platform 2. It has two serving positions and uses the TRIBUTE ticket issuing system.

== Services ==
As of the June 2024 timetable the typical Monday to Friday off-peak service in trains per hour (tph) is:

- 4 tph (trains per hour) westbound to London Fenchurch Street via Basildon (2 tph all stations and 2 tph semi-fast)
- 4 tph eastbound to Shoeburyness.

Preceding station	National Rail	Following station
Southend Central	c2c London, Tilbury and Southend line	Thorpe Bay
