= C2c (1996–2025) =

Train operating company in South East England

c2c

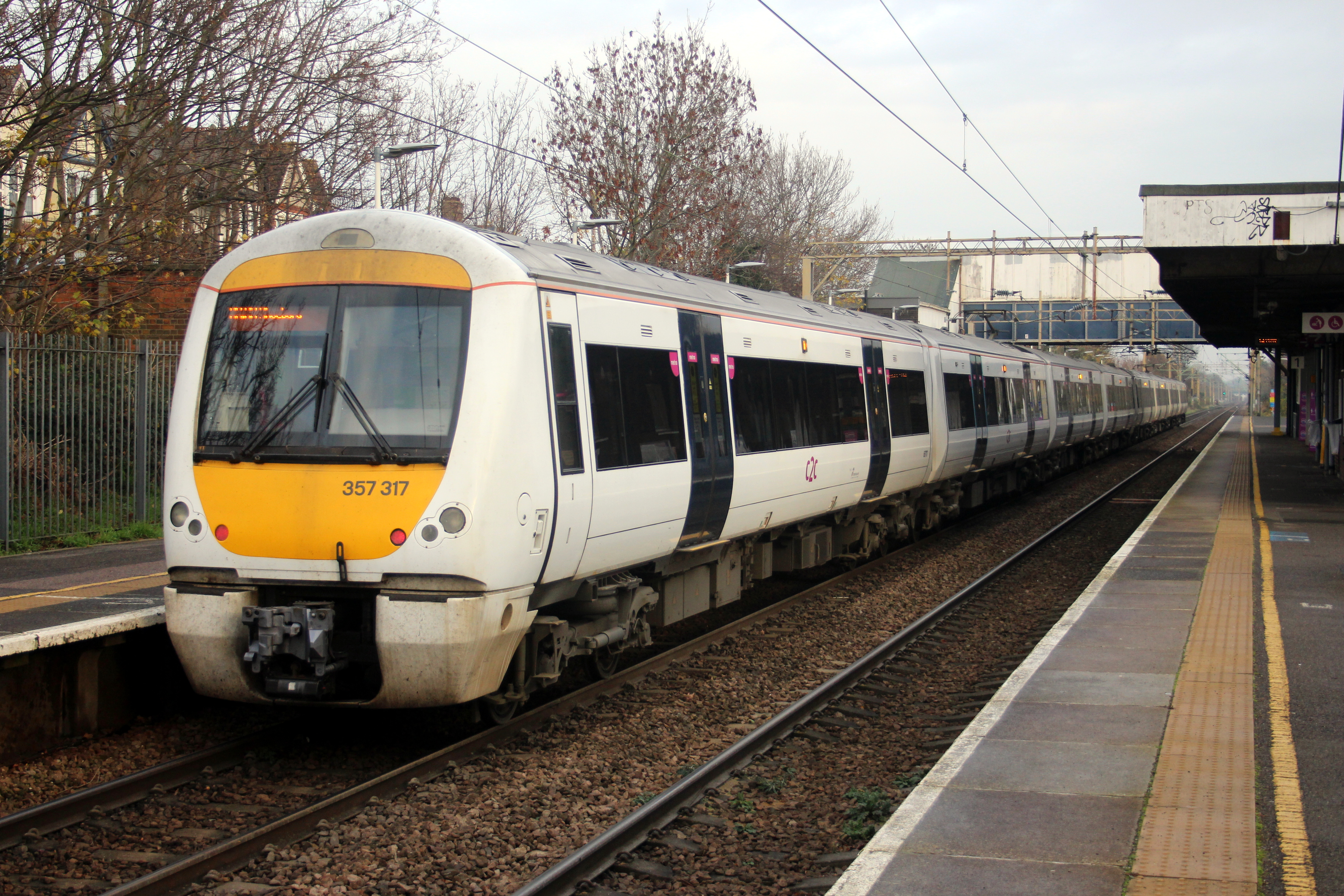
- Class 357 Electrostar at Southend East in 2020

Overview
- Franchises: London, Tilbury & Southend: 26 May 1996 – 8 November 2014; Essex Thameside: 9 November 2014 – 18 July 2021
- Contract: Essex Thameside: 19 July 2021 – 20 July 2025
- Main route: Fenchurch Street to Shoeburyness
- Other routes: Fenchurch Street to Grays via Rainham; Fenchurch Street to Pitsea via Ockendon; Liverpool Street to Shoeburyness
- Fleet: Class 357 Electrostar; Class 720 Aventra
- Stations called at: 28
- Stations operated: 25
- Parent company: Prism Rail (1996–2000); National Express (2000–2017); Trenitalia (2017–2025)
- Headquarters: Lower Thames Street, London
- Reporting mark: CC
- Dates of operation: 26 May 1996–20 July 2025
- Predecessor: Network SouthEast
- Successor: c2c Railway Limited

Technical
- Length: 125.5 kilometres (78.0 mi)

Other
- Website: www.c2c-online.co.uk

Trenitalia c2c Limited, trading as c2c, was a British train operating company that operated commuter services from the London terminus at Fenchurch Street to parts of East London and south Essex along the London, Tilbury and Southend line. It was the operator of the Essex Thameside railway franchise, and later rail contract, from 26 May 1996 to 20 July 2025.

After the privatisation of British Rail, the London, Tilbury & Southend railway franchise was awarded to Prism Rail, who began operating as LTS Rail in May 1996. To fulfil its original franchise commitment of replacing its slam-door rolling stock, LTS Rail ordered 44 Class 357 Electrostar electric multiple units (EMUs) in 1997; an additional order two years later saw the replacement completed by 2003. During 2000, LTS Rail rebranded as c2c, the same year Prism Rail was acquired by National Express.

The original franchise was scheduled to conclude on 26 May 2011, but received multiple extensions before National Express was awarded a second franchise in 2014. Various service changes and amenities have been introduced over the course of the two franchise periods, including the fitting of regenerative braking to its rolling stock (the first UK train operator to do so) in March 2007, the launch of Quiet Zones onboard its trains in early 2008, the provision of Wi-Fi in April 2017, and the rolling out of pay-as-you-go and National Rail ITSO smartcard ticket options over multiple years.

In February 2017, National Express sold c2c to Trenitalia. During December of that year, c2c announced an order with Porterbrook for six 10-car Class 720/6 Aventra EMUs in response to growing demand; they were introduced as twelve 5-car units in September 2023. Largely in response to the COVID-19 pandemic, the franchise agreement was replaced by a rail contract on 19 July 2021 under which services have continued to be run. In February 2023, the Department for Transport (DfT) announced the extension of c2c's contract through to July 2025. c2c was one of several train operators impacted by the 2022–2024 United Kingdom railway strikes.

The company was renationalised and taken over by DfT Operator when its contract expired on 20 July 2025. At the time of its takeover, it had a customer satisfaction rating of 89%, one of the best in the country. The new state-owned operator continues to be known as c2c.

== History ==
=== First franchise (1996–2014) ===
==== LTS Rail ====
The London, Tilbury and Southend franchise was created as part of the privatisation of British Rail. In December 1995, the franchise was awarded to a management buyout; the handover was initially due to happen on 4 February 1996. However, on 1 February 1996, ticketing and settlement irregularities were discovered and the other shortlisted bidders were invited to tender again. In May 1996, the franchise was awarded to Prism Rail by the Director of Passenger Rail Franchising for a period of 15 years. It began operating as LTS Rail on 26 May 1996. The franchise period could have been reduced to seven years if the operator did not fulfil commitments made during the bidding phase to replace its rolling stock with new-build trains.

Passenger numbers increased above forecasts which caused overcrowding as trains reached capacity at peak times. During 1998, the franchise was renegotiated to provide for the elimination of slam-door rolling stock and increased fleet by March 2002, increased staffing of stations, real-time passenger information system, improved security measures, improved station facilities for disabled people, increased cycle storage and pedestrian access from Chafford Hundred railway station to Lakeside Shopping Centre.

LTS Rail started serving West Ham from 14 May 1999 to coincide with the opening of the Jubilee line extension. Peak services were restricted at West Ham, because of limitations of the signalling system. These were eliminated in time for the December 2011 timetable change ahead of the 2012 Summer Olympics.

On 2 July 2000, the business was rebranded as c2c. To coincide with the rebranding, the company website was launched on 16 June 2000. The company name was also changed from LTS Rail Limited to c2c Rail Limited shortly thereafter.

==== National Express ====
During July 2000, c2c was included in the sale of Prism Rail to National Express. The merger of the companies was completed on 19 September 2000. National Express combined the management and support functions of c2c, Silverlink, WAGN and Stansted Express in a single organisation called London Lines in March 2001.

In March 2002, management of Fenchurch Street Station was transferred from c2c to Network Rail.

During January 2005, it was announced that an on-train television service would be tried out, and one unit had televisions installed. In June 2006, the 360 On-Board Television service ran into financial difficulties when c2c's partner in the project, TNCI (UK), ceased trading, and the service was withdrawn. c2c indicated it would restart the roll-out should a suitable partner be found.

In June 2006, it was announced that portable X-ray machines and metal detectors would be randomly placed at stations and carried by officers on trains during summer 2006 to catch people carrying weapons, in a joint operation with Essex Police and British Transport Police, following trials at London Underground stations.

A peak timetable introduced on 11 December 2006, with the aim of improving services for the Thurrock and London Riverside sections of the Thames Gateway, was withdrawn on 8 January 2007 after a campaign by passengers as a result of delays and cancellations that affected other lines on the network. During August 2006, c2c agreed to work with Passenger Focus to establish a passenger panel.

In October 2007, c2c announced that the first coach of each unit would be made a Quiet Zone, where passengers are asked not to use their mobile phones or play music out loud. The Quiet Zone was introduced during early 2008 and is indicated by magenta vinyl stickers on the doors of the coach.

In October 2007, c2c announced that it had switched to renewably-generated electricity in all its stations, maintenance facilities and offices in a contract with E.ON UK, said to be the largest of its kind in the transport sector.

The franchise was originally due to conclude on 26 May 2011. In December 2010, the Department for Transport granted National Express an extension until 26 May 2013 to allow DfT time to conduct a review of the franchising process. During March 2013, the Secretary of State for Transport announced the franchise would again be extended until 13 September 2014. A further delay saw this extended until 8 November 2014.

=== Second franchise (2014–2021) ===
On 9 November 2014, National Express was awarded the new 15-year Essex Thameside franchise, having successfully tendered against Abellio, FirstGroup and MTR Corporation. The c2c brand was retained for the new operator, NXET Trains Limited, which replaced c2c Rail Limited. Management of Fenchurch Street station transferred from Network Rail to c2c.

During December 2015, c2c introduced a new timetable to reflect long-term changes in passenger numbers at stations on the line. Consultation responses to the draft timetable published in October 2014 indicated dissatisfaction with many of the proposed changes. c2c was criticised for putting the interests of "one-stop hoppers" (passengers travelling between Barking and West Ham) above those who travel further on the line.

==== Trenitalia ====
In February 2017, National Express sold c2c to Trenitalia. c2c was the only remaining National Express operated UK rail franchise, down from a peak of nine in 2003. The company name was subsequently changed to Trenitalia c2c Limited.

On 1 April 2017, c2c introduced a new on-board Wi-Fi service free to all customers. Also, it had an on-board entertainment service called Vista. c2c partnered with Now TV to provide free television shows available to stream for c2c passengers.

During the summer of 2019, c2c ran an hourly weekend limited stop service between Fenchurch Street and Shoeburyness. The new service coincided with the weekend extension of Fenchurch Street to Southend Central via Ockendon trains to Shoeburyness, providing a seven trains per hour service between Shoeburyness and Benfleet on Saturdays and a five trains per hour service on Sundays.

In September 2019, it was announced that c2c had invested more than £10 million into a new self service ticketing system with a user-friendly self-service interface developed with Voodoo Park. The interface is completely web-based and can be remotely repaired. The ticket machines installed in 2019 are from the Italian company Sigma Spa.

On 23 September 2019, c2c announced that it would be removing the first-to-last staffing at some stations and reducing ticket-office opening hours.

On 31 March 2020, Trenitalia and the Department for Transport entered into an emergency measures agreement to vary the terms of the franchise agreement during the COVID-19 pandemic. This took effect on 1 April 2020 and lasted until 20 September 2020. On 19 September 2020, Trenitalia and the Department for Transport entered into an emergency recovery measures agreement. This was a precursor to the replacement of the franchise agreement with a rail contract.

=== Rail contract (2021–2025) ===
On 19 July 2021, the franchise agreement was replaced with a rail contract, which was due to expire on 23 July 2023.

During May 2022, the timetable was amended to accommodate the London Overground extension to Barking Riverside, the extension having started running in July 2022 as a spur from the Tilbury loop line east of Barking, sharing infrastructure with c2c services.

c2c was one of several train operators impacted by the 2022–2024 United Kingdom railway strikes, which was the first national rail strike in the UK for three decades. Its workers were amongst those participating in industrial action owing to a dispute over pay and working conditions.

=== State ownership ===
In the lead up to the 2024 United Kingdom general election, the Labour Party of Keir Starmer committed itself to bring the passenger operations of the British rail network back under state ownership. Following its election in 2024, the government introduced the Passenger Railway Services (Public Ownership) Act 2024 that received the royal assent in November 2024. In February 2023, the Department for Transport announced that c2c's contract had been extended to 20 July 2025. In December 2024, it was announced that the Trenitalia operated c2c National Rail Contract would not be renewed when it expired, with DfT Operator took over on 20 July 2025.

At the time of its takeover, Trentalia-owned c2c had a customer satisfaction rating of 89%, one of the highest in the country.

== Branding ==
LTS Rail logo used prior to the rebrand

The name c2c had no specific meaning, but is often thought to represent "city to coast" or "capital to coast", reflecting the nature of the route, or "commitment to customers".

The c2c website stated:

The name c2c doesn't mean anything specific. In a sense it can mean anything you want it to. Its uniqueness reflects the young, vibrant character of the people we serve. c2c could stand for coast to capital, or capital to coast. From our point of view, one of the most important things it stands for is commitment to customers.

National Express also referred to the c2c route as City to Coast. c2c used the slogan "way2go", but later used the "Making travel simpler" slogan also used by other National Express companies.

== Services ==
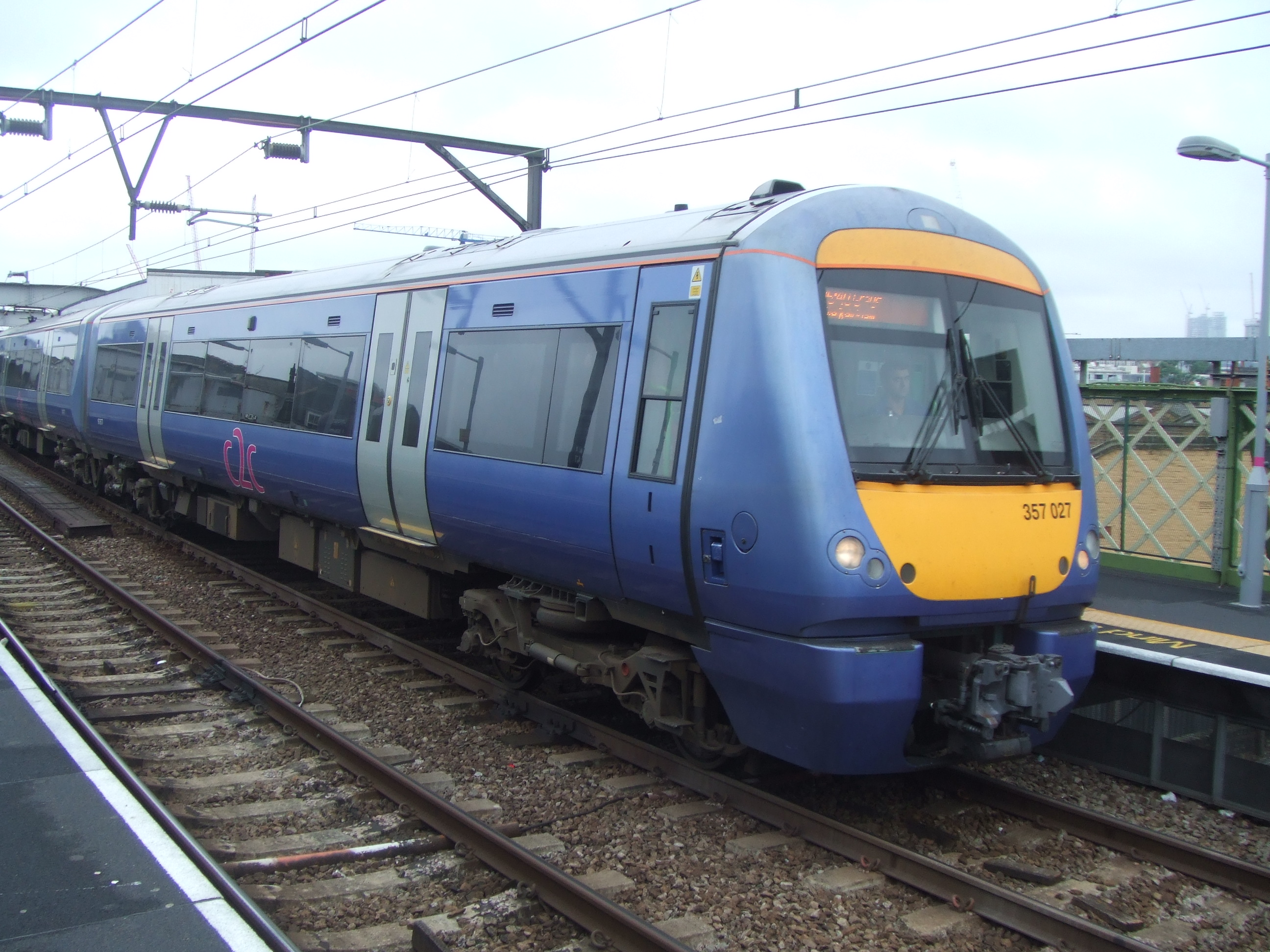
Class 357 Electrostar at Limehouse station in 2007 in the original livery

=== Routes ===
c2c operated passenger services on the London, Tilbury and Southend line from Fenchurch Street in the City of London to Shoeburyness in Essex, a distance of 39 miles 40 chains (63.57 km). The main line operated via Basildon with a loop line via Tilbury and a branch line via Ockendon. c2c trains connected Central London with East London and the northern Thames Gateway area of southern Essex. The main route between Fenchurch Street and Shoeburyness had a fastest timetabled journey of 56 minutes.

Although the Class 357 Electrostar and Class 720 Aventra trains were capable of running at 100 mph (160 km/h), the line's speed limit restricted them to only 75 mph (121 km/h). To meet a 2014 franchise commitment, most services between Fenchurch Street and Barking called at all stations during peak times from December 2015 onwards.

As of May 2025 the off-peak Monday–Friday service was as follows:

London, Tilbury and Southend line
Route	tph	Calling at
Fenchurch Street to Shoeburyness via Basildon	4	Limehouse, West Ham, Barking, Upminster, West Horndon (2 tph), Laindon, Basildon, Pitsea (2 tph), Benfleet, Leigh-on-Sea, Chalkwell, Westcliff, Southend Central, Southend East, Thorpe Bay
Fenchurch Street to Southend Central via Ockendon	2	Limehouse, West Ham, Barking, Upminster, Ockendon, Chafford Hundred Lakeside, Grays, Tilbury Town, East Tilbury, Stanford-le-Hope, Pitsea, Benfleet, Leigh-on-Sea, Chalkwell, Westcliff
Fenchurch Street to Grays via Rainham	2	Limehouse, West Ham, Barking, Dagenham Dock, Rainham, Purfleet

=== Use of Liverpool Street ===
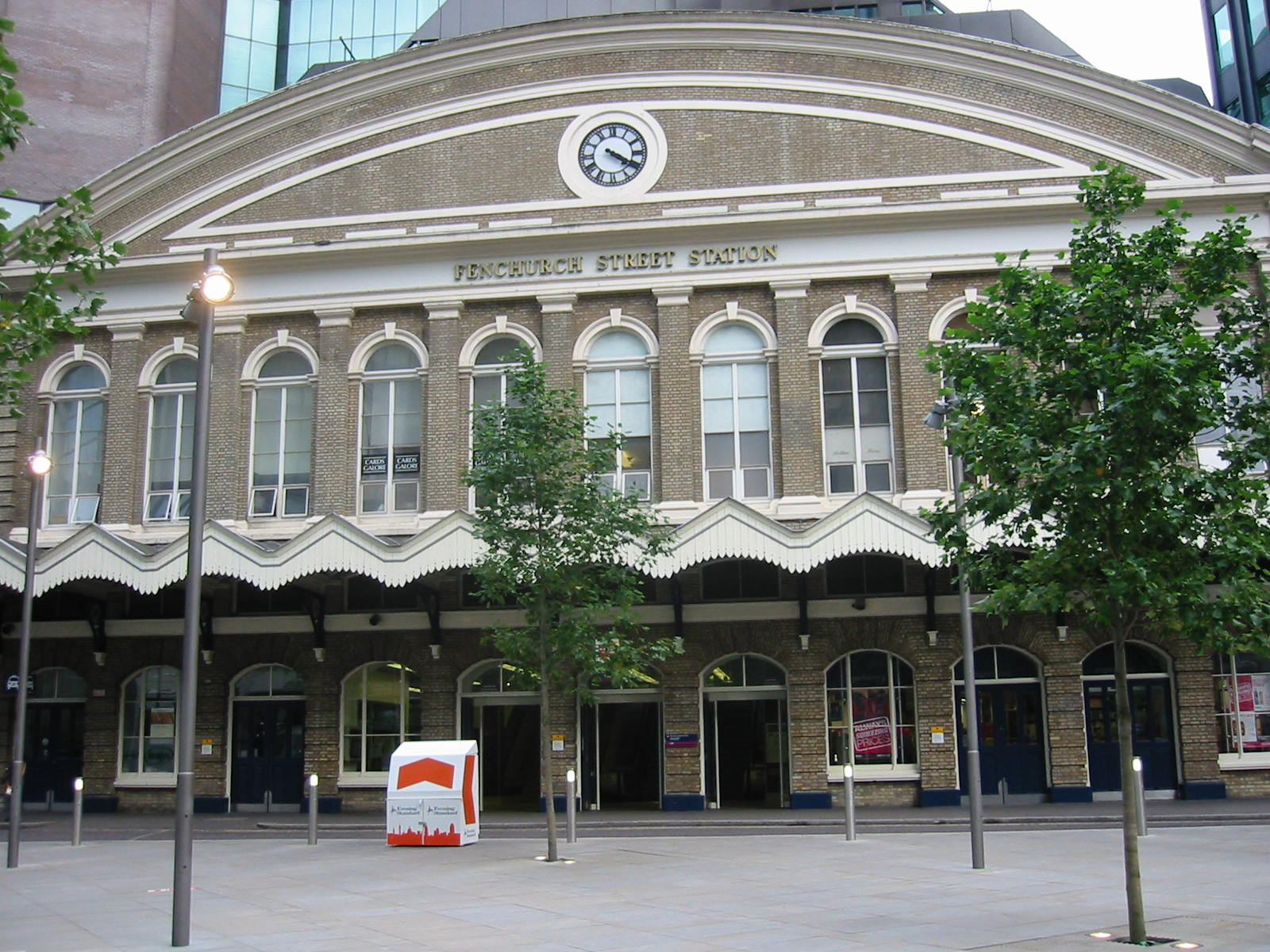
Most c2c services operate from Fenchurch Street railway station

c2c operated a limited service to London Liverpool Street that diverges at Barking, and called at Stratford instead of West Ham, Limehouse and Fenchurch Street. This service ran at weekends temporarily during 2014 and permanently from December 2015. This route can also be utilised during engineering works. The route uses the Gospel Oak to Barking line and the Great Eastern Main Line, with trains passing through Woodgrange Park, Forest Gate, and Maryland stations without stopping.

== Ticketing ==
c2c issued tickets for travel to National Rail ITSO smartcards branded 'c2c Smart' since 3 November 2014.

Through historic agreement there is interavailable ticketing with the London Underground between Fenchurch Street/Tower Hill and Upminster, with the fares set by Transport for London. Since January 2004 the pay-as-you-go product on Oyster card has been available at stations between Fenchurch Street/Liverpool Street and Upminster. It was extended to Dagenham Dock and Rainham in 2008. During January 2010, it was extended to Chafford Hundred, Grays, Ockendon and Purfleet.

Pay-as-you-go payment by contactless bank card or smartphone is available at all stations between Fenchurch Street/Liverpool Street and Grays. Contactless pay-as-you-go payment was due to be extended to all stations by December 2023. The expansion of contactless pay-as-you-go ticketing was delayed indefinitely because of technical problems.

During 2023, security teams employed by c2c and operating in partnership with the British Transport Police conducted a crackdown on fare evasion; the resulting fines generated in excess of £250,000 in under a year. Starting on 3 December 2023, fares were revised with a new weekday evening peak period introduced between 4pm and 7pm, during which off-peak tickets could no longer be used. Super off-peak tickets were withdrawn entirely.

From January 2024 c2c started to accept electronic tickets that can be purchased and stored on a mobile phone. This followed a trial during December 2023.

== Rolling stock ==
=== Slam-door replacement ===
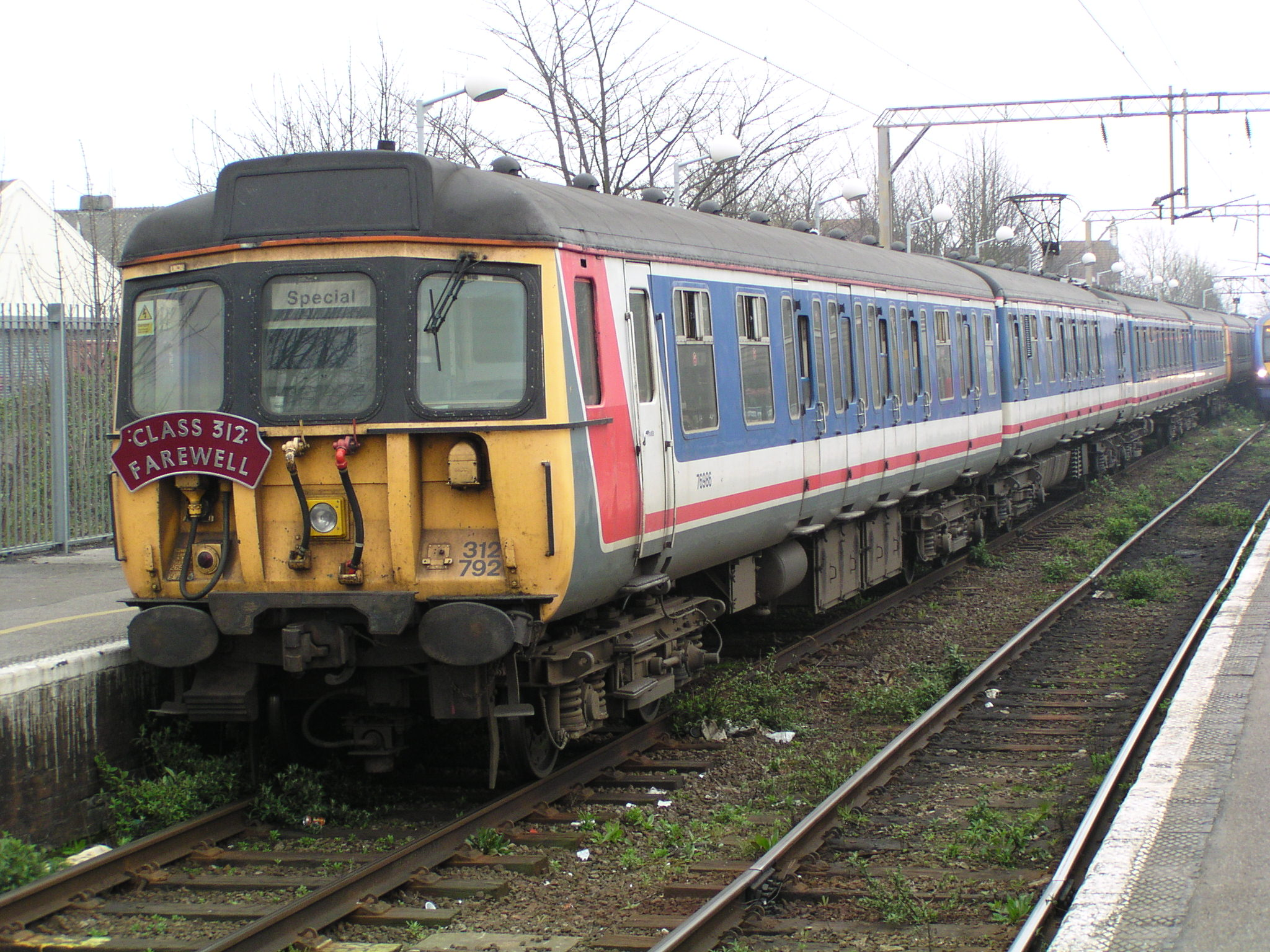
Class 312 at Shoeburyness station on 29 March 2003, the final day of running.

LTS Rail inherited a fleet of slam-door electric multiple unit Class 302, Class 310 and Class 312 train sets from Network SouthEast. The original franchise agreement was for 25 sliding door trainsets (consisting of 100 carriages) to be transferred from West Anglia Great Northern (WAGN) and for 44 new trains (consisting of 176 carriages) to be ordered by the company. LTS Rail ordered 44 Class 357 Electrostar units in 1997, to be leased from Porterbrook. The most elderly Class 302 units were removed from regular service on 4 July 1998, several sets were retained as spares in case of stock shortages. By mid-1997, WAGN had released 18 Class 317 units. However, both companies were experiencing an unexpected increase in passenger numbers and WAGN was unable to release more vehicles by December 1998.

The franchise agreement was renegotiated in November 1998 to replace the entire LTS Rail fleet with new vehicles, allowing for the return of the Class 317s to WAGN and the planned elimination of slam-door stock by March 2002. The first Class 357 train was delivered in 1999. A second batch of 28 Class 357 units was ordered in December 1999, to be leased from Angel Trains. This satisfied a franchise commitment to increase the fleet by three units. Reliability problems with the new trains led to their withdrawal from service at peak times in October 2000. By way of compensation, two additional units were added to the first order for free by the supplier Adtranz. During 2003, c2c became the first train operating company to have replaced its entire fleet with new accessible trains. The last slam-door Class 312 service ran on 29 March 2003.

=== Class 357 ===
In March 2007, after extensive trials, c2c began fitting regenerative braking to its fleet, becoming the first UK train operator to do so. On 3 June 2007, the eve of World Environment Day, one train was given an all-over green vinyl sticker livery with the slogan "All c2c trains are greener now – find out more at – www.c2c-online.co.uk – c2c – the greener way to go" to highlight the completion of the scheme, which the company said has enabled energy savings of up to 20%.

With a few Class 357s being out of service at the same time, from late 2006 two Class 321s were hired from Silverlink for three months for weekday peak-hour use between Fenchurch Street and Laindon, and Pitsea via Rainham, to cover for the unavailable units.

In June 2009, Bombardier began repainting the Class 357 units. The vinyl wraps carrying the original purplish blue and magenta c2c livery were removed and the units reliveried in white with dark blue doors. The last blue liveried train ran on 5 March 2011.

=== Overcrowding relief ===
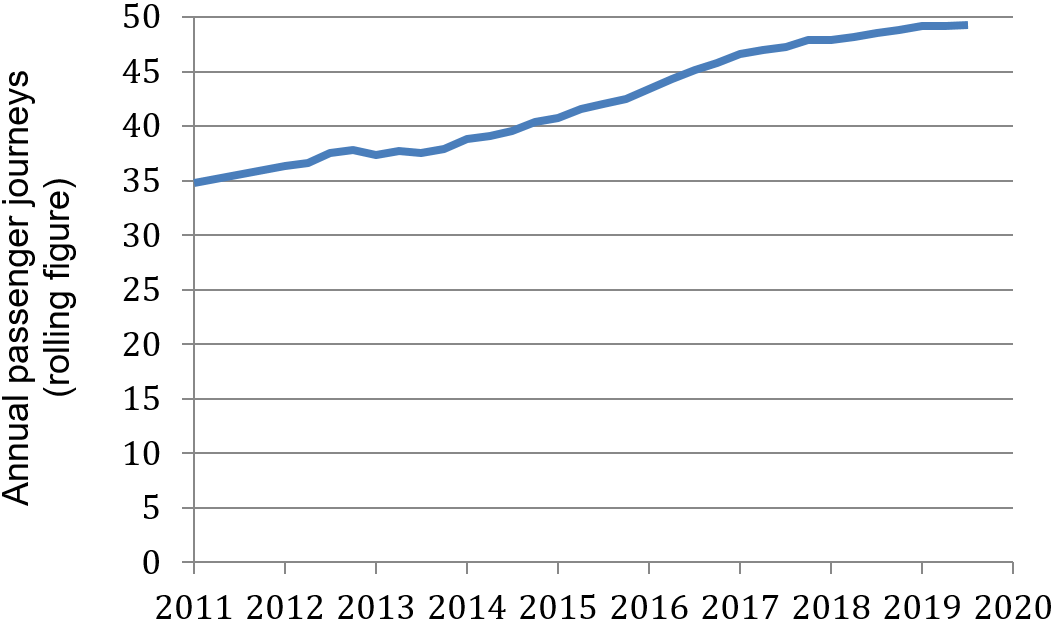
c2c passenger numbers (millions) 2011 – 2019 Q2 (rolling 12 month figure)

As part of the 2014 franchise, c2c committed to leasing new trains to cope with rising passenger numbers, which were boosted especially by the opening of the Docklands Light Railway station at West Ham in 2011 and the rise of Canary Wharf as a financial centre.

The Class 357 trains had been introduced with high density 3+2 seating, with a total capacity of 406, consisting of 282 seats and space for 124 standing. In late 2015 c2c adapted 20% of its carriages into a "Metro" configuration, involving removing seats around doorways and converting trains to a 2+2 layout. The Metro configuration's capacity is 556, consisting of 222 seats, and space for 334 standing. This addressed the issue of the high volumes of passengers using c2c to travel between stations on the District Line; between West Ham, Barking, and Upminster c2c trains stop less frequently and they travel further from the city.

During early 2016, c2c announced that it would lease additional trains to relieve overcrowding. Later that year, the company commenced a lease on six Class 387s for three years from Porterbrook to increase capacity on the busiest services. The first Class 387 set entered service in November 2016.

=== Class 720 ===
In December 2017, c2c announced it had reached an agreement with rolling stock financiers Porterbrook and manufacturer Bombardier to procure 60 Class 720 vehicles of the latter's Aventra family, formed into six 10-car units (later changed to twelve 5-car units), with the intention that they would enter service in 2021. The first train was delivered to c2c on 19 April 2022, and the fleet entered service on 27 September 2023. These replaced the six four-car Class 387 units, which c2c was leasing.

=== Class 357 repaint ===
On 15 May 2024 it was announced that Alstom would be painting and repairing c2c's Class 357s over a 24-month period at their depot in Ilford. The work includes the repair of huck bolt covers, body end corrosion, side vent corrosion, sole bar corrosion, roof corrosion and the repaint of all the units improving the longevity of the fleet. The first refreshed unit, 357207, entered into service on 10 December 2024. The programme is expected to take 24 months to complete with each unit taking 20 days to complete, meaning most units will be refreshed with the current nationalised operator.

=== Final fleet ===
The c2c fleet was maintained at East Ham Depot and Shoeburyness Depot.

Units operated by c2c as of July 2025
Family	Class	Image	Type	Top speed		Number	Carriages	Routes operated	Built
Family	Class	Image	Type	mph	km/h	Number	Carriages	Routes operated	Built
Bombardier Electrostar	357		EMU	100	161	74	4	London, Tilbury and Southend line	1999–2002 Repaint 2024–2026
Alstom Aventra	720/6		EMU	100	161	12	5	London, Tilbury and Southend line	2022

=== Former fleet ===
Former units operated by c2c
Family	Class	Image	Type	Top speed		Number	Carriages	Routes operated	Built	Left fleet
Family	Class	Image	Type	mph	km/h	Number	Carriages	Routes operated	Built	Left fleet
BR First Generation (Mark 1)	302		EMU	75	121	30	4	London, Tilbury and Southend line	1958–1959	1998
BR First Generation (Mark 2)	310		EMU	75	121	35	4	London, Tilbury and Southend line	1965–1967	2002
BR First Generation (Mark 2)	312		EMU	90	145	25	4	London, Tilbury and Southend line	1975–1978	2003
BR Second Generation (Mark 3)	317		EMU	100	161	18	4	London, Tilbury and Southend line	1981–1982, 1985–1987	2002
BR Second Generation (Mark 3)	321		EMU	100	161	2	4	London, Tilbury and Southend line	1981–1982, 1985–1987	2007
Bombardier Electrostar	387/3		EMU	110	177	6	4	London, Tilbury and Southend line	2016	2022

== Performance ==
In the year up to July 2024, c2c trains carried 35.8 million passengers (an increase of 5.9% from the previous year), who travelled 835 million passenger kilometres (+10.6%). Over the course of the year, c2c planned over 106,000 (+3.8%) services, of which 79.7% (+2.4%) ran on time. c2c had 638.3 full-time equivalent employees (-0.2%).

Preceded by Network SouthEast; As part of British Rail	Operator of London, Tilbury & Southend franchise 1996–2014	Succeeded by c2c Essex Thameside franchise
Preceded by c2c London, Tilbury & Southend franchise	Operator of Essex Thameside franchise 2014–2021	Succeeded by c2c Essex Thameside rail contract
Preceded by c2c Essex Thameside franchise	Operator of Essex Thameside rail contract 2021–2025	Succeeded by c2c
