= West Ham station =

London Underground, Docklands Light Railway and National rail station

West Ham
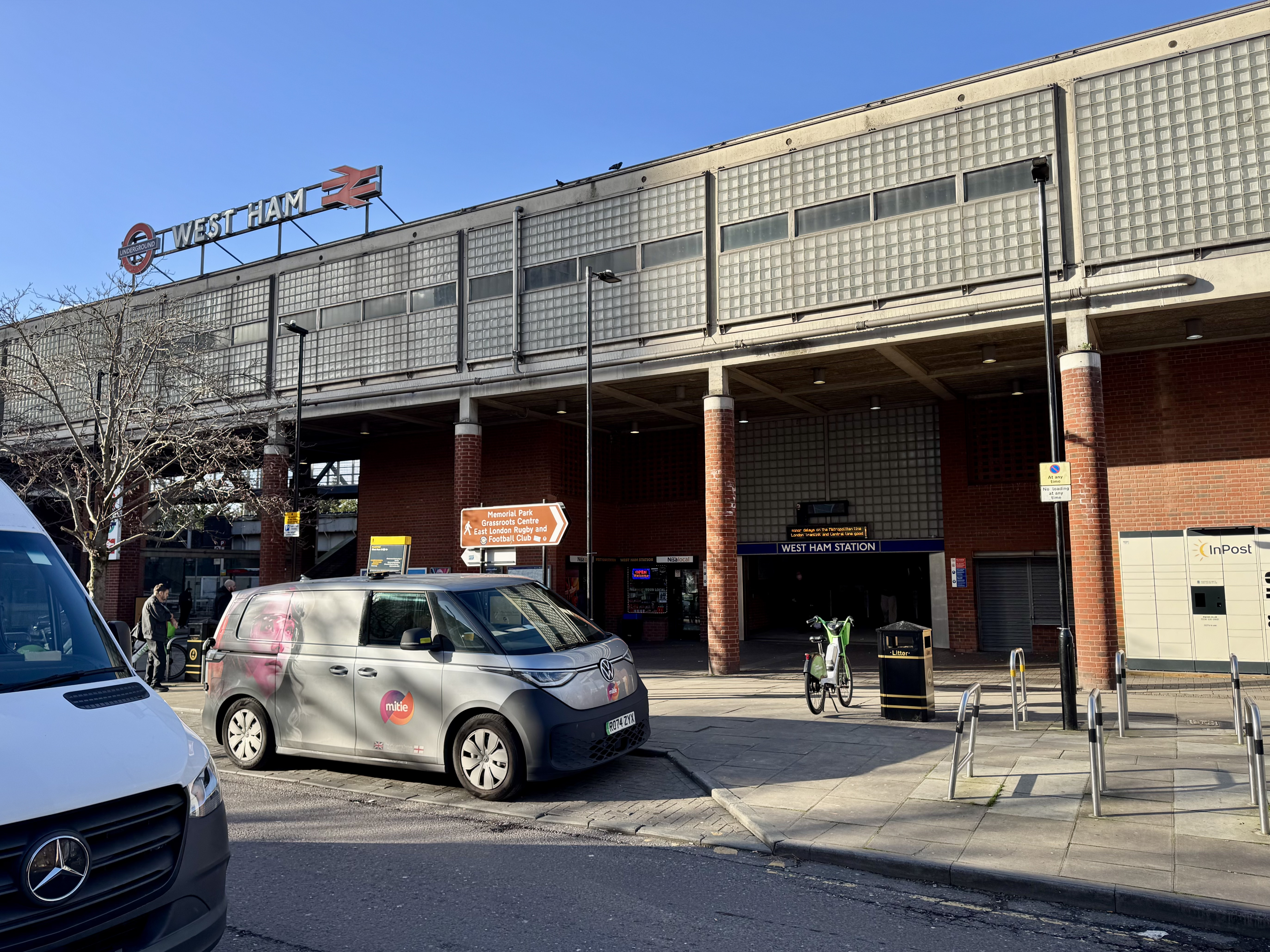
- Entrance on Memorial Avenue

General information
- Location: West Ham, Newham
- Coordinates: 51.5286°N 0.0061°E
- Owner: Transport for London
- Manager: London Underground
- Platforms: 8

Construction
- Accessible: Yes

Other information
- Station code: WEH
- Fare zone: 2 and 3
- Classification: Category C1
- Website: Official website

History
- Opened: 1 February 1901
- Former names: West Ham (Manor Road) (1924–1969)
- Original company: London, Tilbury and Southend Railway
- Pre-grouping: Midland Railway
- Post-grouping: London, Midland and Scottish Railway

Key dates
- 2 June 1902: District line started
- 1913: London–Southend withdrawn
- 1 January 1916: North London Railway withdrawn
- 30 March 1936: Metropolitan line started
- 14 May 1979: Crosstown Linkline started
- 14 May 1999: Jubilee line started
- 30 May 1999: LTS Rail started
- 9 December 2006: North London Line withdrawn
- 31 August 2011: DLR started

Passengers

London Underground annual entry and exit
- 2021: ▼2.72 million
- 2022: ▲4.51 million
- 2023: ▲5.34 million
- 2024: ▼5.26 million
- 2025: ▼5.22 million

DLR annual entry and exit
- 2021: ▼2.006 million
- 2022: No data (Note: DLR passenger data for 2022 is included in the London Underground figure.)
- 2023: No data (Note: DLR passenger data for 2023 is included in the London Underground figure.)
- 2024: No data (Note: DLR passenger data for 2024 is included in the London Underground figure.)
- 2025: No data (Note: DLR passenger data for 2025 is included in the London Underground figure.)

National Rail annual entry and exit
- 2021–22: ▲7.451 million
- Interchange: 2,994
- 2022–23: ▲9.052 million
- Interchange: ▼5,268
- 2023–24: ▲9.647 million
- Interchange: ▼4,932
- 2024–25: ▲11.065 million
- Interchange: ▲5,599
- 2025–26: ▲11.811 million
- Interchange: ▼5,391
Location
- Location in Newham

West Ham (/ˈwɛst ˈhæm/) is an interchange station in West Ham in the London Borough of Newham, East London. It is on the London, Tilbury and Southend line, 4 miles 8 chains (6.6 km) down the line from Fenchurch Street in Central London. It is on the District, Hammersmith & City and Jubilee lines of the London Underground and is on the Docklands Light Railway (DLR).

The station was originally opened on 1 February 1901 by the London, Tilbury and Southend Railway as an infill station and was also served by the North London Railway. It was built with four platforms in anticipation of the District Railway service that began on 2 June 1902 and exclusively served the station from 1916. Metropolitan line service commenced in 1936. Additional platforms were opened to serve the Crosstown Linkline service on 14 May 1979. The station was completely rebuilt as part of the Jubilee Line Extension, with four new platforms built for Jubilee line and LTS Rail service that commenced on 14 May 1999 and 30 May 1999 respectively. DLR service was introduced on 31 August 2011. The station is in London fare zones 2 and 3.

== History ==
The first railway through the site was the Eastern Counties and Thames Junction Railway (ECTJR) that was constructed north–south and opened on 29 April 1846, linking Stratford with Thames Wharf via Canning Town. The London, Tilbury and Southend Railway (LTSR) direct line between Bow and Barking was constructed east–west through the middle of the parish of West Ham with service starting on 31 March 1858. Prior to the building of the line, trains took a longer and more congested route via Stratford and Forest Gate. The new line initially had stations at Bromley, Plaistow and East Ham. Neither the ECTJR or the LTSR provided a station at West Ham as it was uninhabited marshland with poor road access. In November 1897, Arnold Hills secured an agreement with the LTSR to build an infill station at West Ham. Hills was the managing director of the Thames Ironworks and Shipbuilding Company and their works football team—Thames Ironworks F.C.—played at the nearby Memorial Grounds that had opened in 1897. As the LTSR had gained powers in 1898 to quadruple the line, it was decided to build the station with four platforms on two islands so later rebuilding would not be necessary. (Note: The outer platforms were used as bay roads until the line was quadrupled and two additional bridges were constructed to the west.) West Ham station was completed in May 1900, but did not open until 1 February 1901.

The North London Railway (NLR) had already been running a daily service to Plaistow via the Bow–Bromley curve since 18 May 1869, and when West Ham opened, it began calling there. After the line was quadrupled on 9 July 1905, the NLR switched to the southern of the two island platforms. (Note: This coincided with the opening of a new bay platform at Plaistow on the southern side.) The Whitechapel and Bow Railway opened on 2 June 1902 and allowed through services of the District Railway (DR) to operate to Upminster. The DR converted to electric trains in 1905 and services were cut back to East Ham. (Note: Electric service was extended to Barking on 1 April 1908.) LTSR trains from Fenchurch Street used the southern platforms when electric DR services began but stopping was reduced to a few a week in 1908 and to nil in 1913. The LTSR became part of the Midland Railway (MR) in 1912. The NLR service to Plaistow ceased on 1 January 1916. (Note: After the NLR service to Plaistow ceased on 1 January 1916 the southern platforms were unused in normal service.) The MR was amalgamated into the London, Midland and Scottish Railway (LMS) on 1 January 1923. The station was renamed West Ham (Manor Road) on 11 February 1924 at the request of West Ham Borough Council.

The District Railway was incorporated into London Transport in 1933, and became known as the District line. The eastern section of the District line was very overcrowded by the mid 1930s. In order to relieve this, the Metropolitan line service was extended to Barking. (Note: This was achieved by diverting Metropolitan line trains that had previously been routed onto the East London Line at Whitechapel.) West Ham was served by a single daily Metropolitan line train from Hammersmith from 30 March 1936. This was expanded from 4 May 1936 with an eight-trains-per-hour service between Barking and Hammersmith at peak times. This was increased to ten trains per hour at West Ham from 8 May 1938. (Note: The two extra trains terminated at East Ham.) The Hammersmith service was swapped for longer Uxbridge trains from 17 July 1939, at eight trains per hour at peak times. This service was suspended on 6 October 1941 with Hammersmith trains again running to Barking. The southern platforms were taken out of use after bomb damage in 1940 which had completely closed the station from 7 September 1940 until 11 August 1941. (Note: The lengthy closure reflects the low priority of the station rather than the extent of the damage.) After nationalisation of the railways in 1948, management of the station passed to British Railways. On 1 January 1969 ownership transferred to the London Underground. The station was renamed back to West Ham on 1 January 1969.

Platforms were constructed on the former ECTJR line at West Ham and opened on 14 May 1979 when the Crosstown Linkline service began between Camden Road and North Woolwich. The Crosstown Linkline was replaced with the electric North London Line (NLL) service between Richmond and North Woolwich on 13 May 1985. On 30 July 1990, the Hammersmith–Barking service of the Metropolitan line gained a separate identity as the Hammersmith & City line.

Between 1993 and 1998, the station was comprehensively rebuilt as part of the Jubilee Line Extension (JLE), with the new station entrance coming into use in 1997. Jubilee line services began on 14 May 1999, with step-free access provided to both the existing Underground and new Jubilee line platforms. A replacement southern island platform for LTS Rail opened on 30 May 1999. NLL services at the station ceased on 9 December 2006, when the line from Stratford to North Woolwich was closed, to allow for the line to be converted for the Docklands Light Railway (DLR). From 13 December 2009, off-peak Hammersmith & City line service was extended from Whitechapel to Barking with a daily all-day service at West Ham. The former NLL platforms reopened on 31 August 2011 as part of the DLR extension to Stratford International, with a new lift making the station fully accessible.

=== Incidents ===
On 15 March 1976, nine people were injured by an explosion on a train by a member of the Provisional IRA. Julius Stephen, the driver of the train, was shot dead at the scene when he attempted to pursue the fleeing bomber. A commemorative plaque was installed on the District and Hammersmith & City line platforms in 2022.

== Design ==
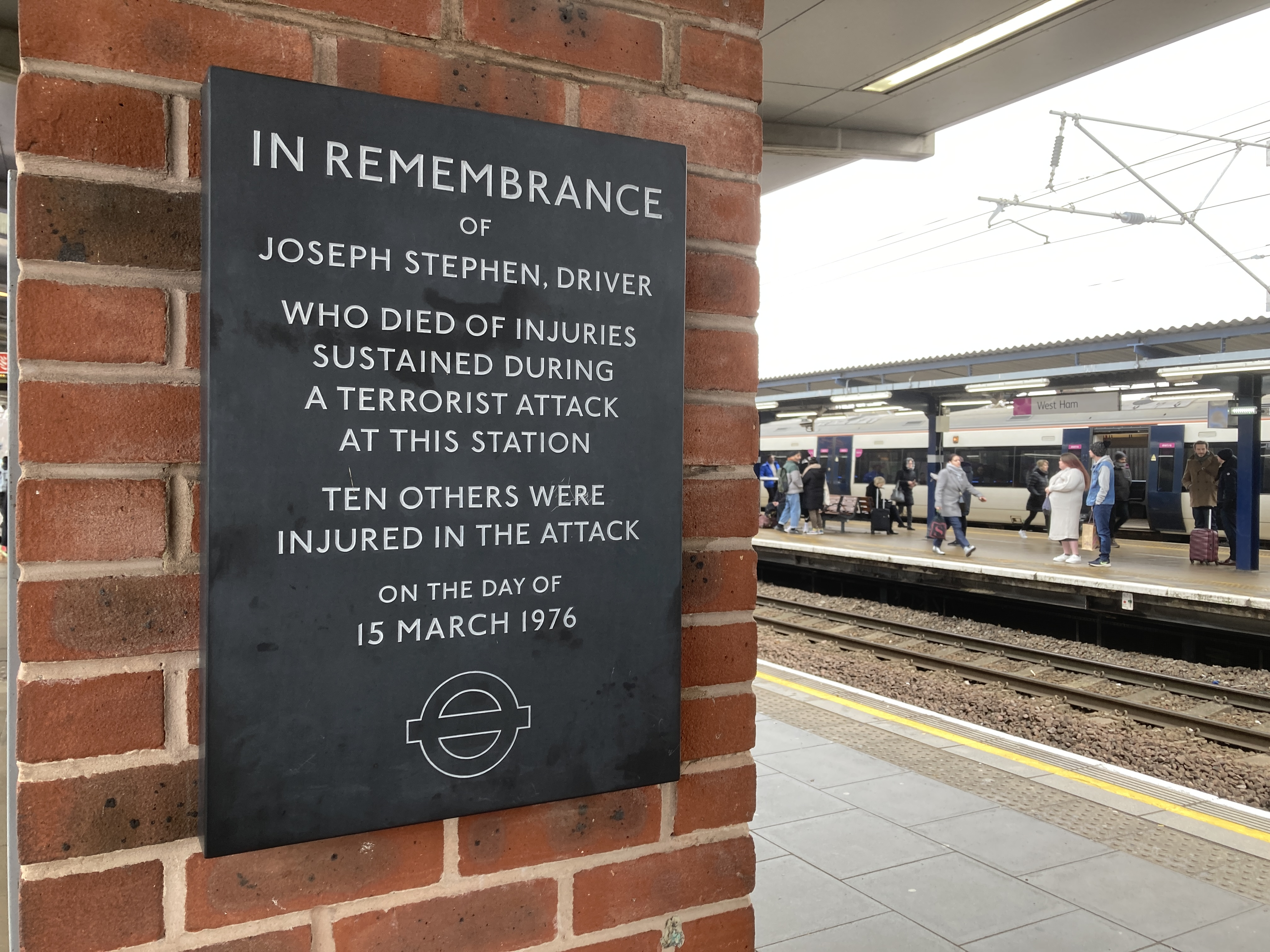
Commemorative plaque on the northern island platform

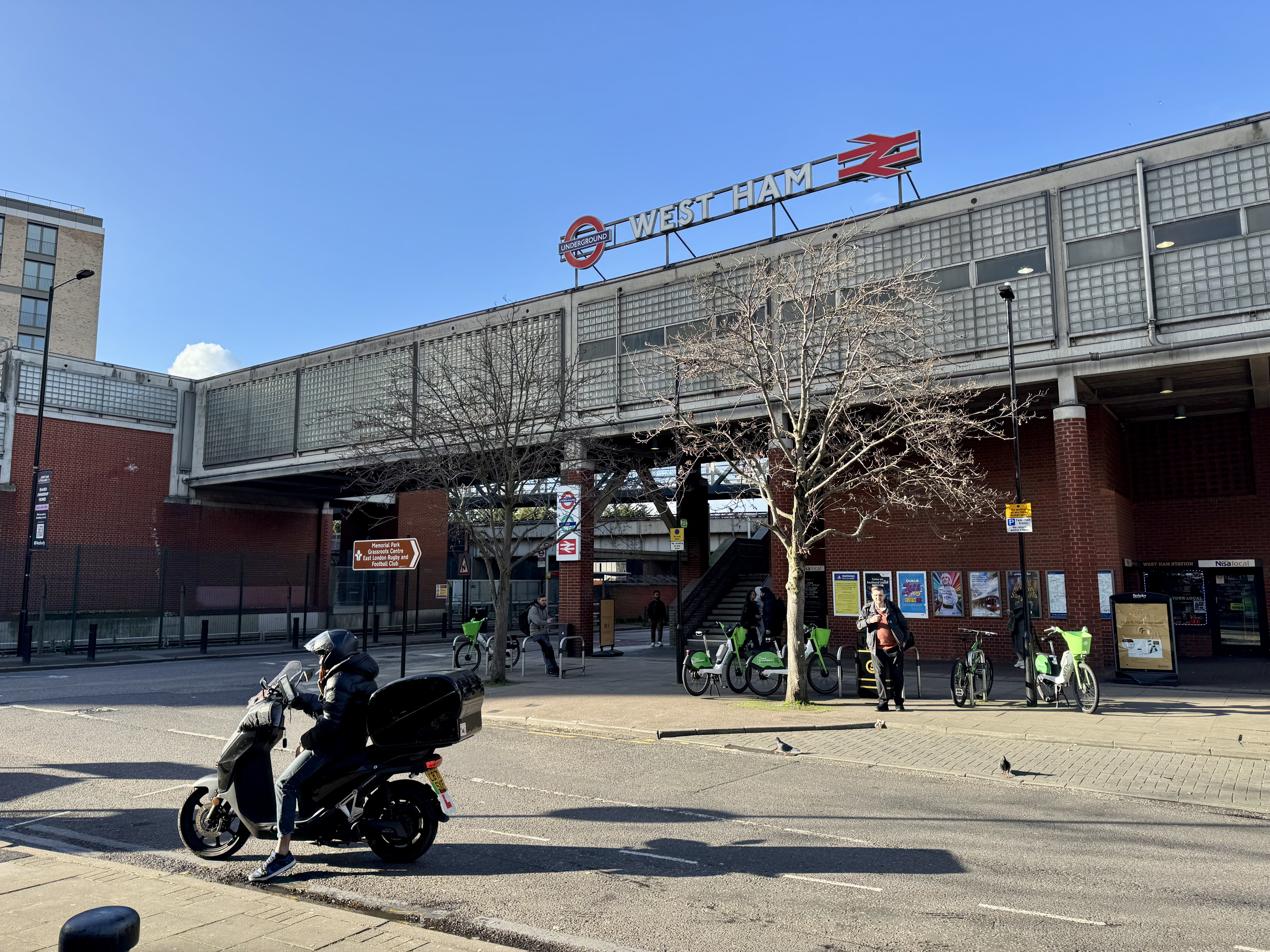
The footbridge connection between the lower level platforms and the rest of the station

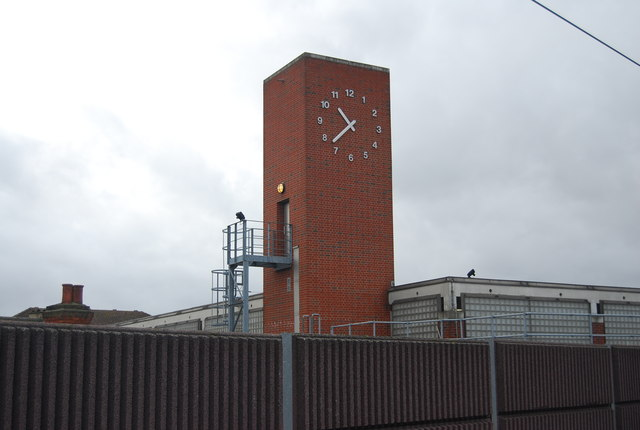
The clock tower

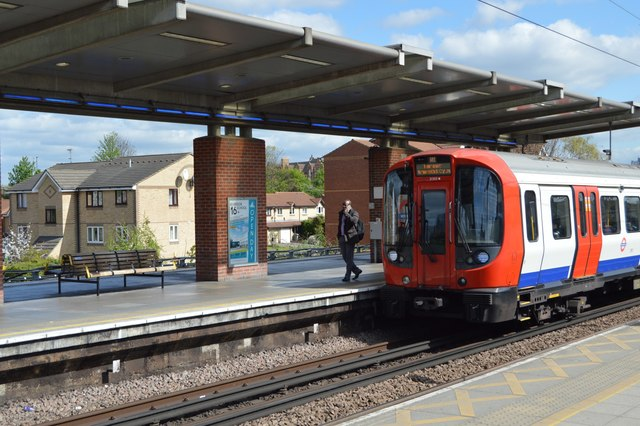
The northern island platform for District and Hammersmith & City line trains

The station consists of four sets of island platforms, two on an elevated east–west alignment and another perpendicular pair at street level, giving a total of eight platform faces. Platform 2, the northernmost, is for eastbound District and Hammersmith & City service. Platform 1, sharing the northern island, is for westbound service. Platform 8, on the adjacent southern island, is served by the down line to Southend. Platform 7 is served by the up line to Fenchurch Street. Platform 6, the westernmost, is for eastbound Jubilee service. Platform 5, sharing the western island, is for westbound service. Platform 4, on the adjacent eastern island, is for northbound DLR service. Platform 3, sharing the eastern island, is for southbound service. All platforms have step-free access to each other and the street.

Little trace remains of the original station buildings. The booking hall was accessed by two doorways between the railway bridges on Manor Road. The pair of 600-foot (180 m) island platforms were identical with 200-foot (61 m) canopies, central waiting rooms and toilets. The southern island platform was demolished in 1956. The northern island platform is from 1901. It was shortened to 400 feet (120 m) in 1959. In 1999, the original structures on the northern island platform were demolished, with a rebuilt platform and a new canopy designed by Jestico + Whiles.

The station entrance building with clock tower, eastern island platform and canopy for the NLL, island platform for the Jubilee line, bridge connecting the lower and upper levels of the station, and the refurbished former booking hall area are from the JLE rebuild, to the designs of van Heyningen and Haward Architects. The van Heyningen and Haward design was considered to evoke the work by Charles Holden in the 1930s. The station was praised, with Jonathan Glancey calling it an "impressive architectural essay in brick, concrete and glass, [...] dominated by an imposing Dudok Dutch-style clock tower". It was "by far the cheapest" of stations built on the JLE, built at a cost of £10.5 million. The station was awarded a Royal Fine Art Commission Trust Award. The Twentieth Century Society has lobbied for West Ham to be listed.

The London, Tilbury and Southend line island platform is from May 1999. It was designed by Nick Derbyshire and built by LTS Rail and Railtrack. Early designs for the JLE station assumed that a new platform would be built to allow interchange, however this was cancelled as British Rail said it would "abstract revenue". The platforms and access staircases are narrow and get easily congested when large numbers of passengers transfer between c2c and the Jubilee line at peak times. To ensure safety, staff must be present on the platforms. Transport for London and Network Rail have considered options to increase capacity, including additional or relocated platforms.

In 2011, a temporary footbridge was constructed to connect the station to the Greenway foot and cycle path, which connected directly to the Olympic Park in Stratford. This helped the station cope with an increase in passenger numbers during the London 2012 Olympic and Paralympic Games. It was removed by the end of 2012. Two footbridges over the railway and Manor Road opened in 2025 to connect with the TwelveTrees Park development. A new station entrance linking the Jubilee line platforms to the development is under construction and expected to open in 2027.

== Location ==
The station is located on Memorial Avenue, in the London Borough of Newham. The historic West Ham village is located about 700 yards (640 m) to the northeast. (Note: Plaistow station is a similar distance from the historic West Ham settlement.) The choice of station name predates West Ham United F.C. taking that name. By the time the station opened it had been adopted, although the club moved to Upton Park in 1904. It is served by London Buses route 276. Plaistow is 0.76 km (0.47 miles) to the east of the station and Bromley-by-Bow is 1.37 km (0.85 miles) to the west. It is 6.60 km (4.10 miles) along the line from Tower Hill in Central London and 18.08 km (11.23 miles) from the eastern terminus at Upminster. The station is 4 miles 8 chains (6.6 km) down the line from Fenchurch Street. Stratford is 1.54 km (0.96 miles) to the north of the station and Canning Town is 1.58 km (0.98 miles) to the south.

== Services ==
The station is managed by London Underground. It is in London fares zones 2 and 3. The typical weekday off-peak service from the station is twelve District line trains per hour to Upminster with a further three trains to Barking. There are fifteen trains westbound to Earl's Court, of which six continue to Ealing Broadway, six continue to Richmond and three continue to Wimbledon. There are six Hammersmith & City line trains an hour to Barking and six to Hammersmith at all times. The off-peak Jubilee line service is twenty-four trains to Stratford and twenty-four to West Hampstead, of which four continue to Willesden Green, four to Wembley Park and twelve to Stanmore. There are six DLR trains an hour to Stratford International and six to Woolwich Arsenal at all times. The c2c off-peak service is eight trains an hour to Fenchurch Street and eight to Barking, of which four continue to Shoeburyness via Basildon, (Note: Two trains per hour all stations and two semi-fast.) two to Grays via Rainham and two to Southend Central via Ockendon. There is 24-hour service from Friday mornings to Sunday nights on the Jubilee line as part of the Night Tube. With 5.22 million entries and exits in 2025, it was ranked the 116th busiest London Underground station.

== Notes ==
Preceding station	National Rail	Following station
Limehouse	c2c London, Tilbury and Southend Line	Barking
Preceding station	London Underground	Following station
Bromley-by-Bow towards Hammersmith	Hammersmith & City line	Plaistow towards Barking
Bromley-by-Bow towards Wimbledon, Richmond or Ealing Broadway	District line	Plaistow towards Upminster
Canning Town towards Stanmore	Jubilee line	Stratford Terminus
Preceding station	Docklands Light Railway	Following station
Abbey Road towards Stratford International	Docklands Light Railway	Star Lane towards Woolwich Arsenal
	Former services	
Stratford	Silverlink North London Line	Canning Town
