= Thorpe Bay =

Area of Southend-on-Sea, England

Coordinates: 51.53267°N 0.75909°E

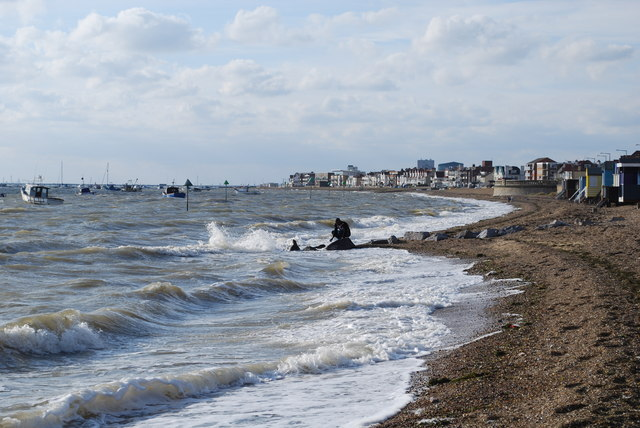

- Location within Essex
- Unitary authority: Southend-on-Sea
- Ceremonial county: Essex
- Region: East
- Country: England
- Sovereign state: United Kingdom
- Post town: SOUTHEND-ON-SEA
- Postcode district: SS1
- Dialling code: 01702
- Police: Essex
- Fire: Essex
- Ambulance: East of England

Thorpe Bay is an area of the city of Southend-on-Sea, in the City of Southend-on-Sea, in the ceremonial county of Essex, England. located on the Thames Estuary. Thorpe Bay is situated within the Thorpe ward of Southend-on-Sea. It is around 4 miles to the east of Southend. Originally the area was called Thorpe, but it was renamed Thorpe Bay, after the railway station. The station had been given the name to indicate that it was a seaside settlement. The majority of Thorpe Bay consists of residential properties, mainly built in the 1920s, arranged in a grid pattern.

== Location ==
Thorpe Bay can be defined as the area between the eastern side of Thorpe Hall Avenue to the west (beyond which is Southchurch), Thorpe Bay beach to the south, Maplin Way to the east, (beyond which is Shoeburyness), up to Station Road (beyond which is Bournes Green).

== Shopping ==
The main shopping area, named 'The Broadway' – after the road on which it lies – is a parade of retail shops and restaurants, as well as medical and professional practices.

== Transport ==
Thorpe Bay railway station is the penultimate station on the London, Tilbury and Southend line served by c2c from London Fenchurch Street (the last being Shoeburyness railway station). Consequently, a large number of London commuters choose to live in Thorpe Bay. Thorpe Bay enjoys good access by bus, provided by Arriva Shires & Essex including the number 1, 4(a), 7, 8 and 9. In 1914, Southend-on-Sea Corporation Tramways' network was extended from Bournes Green to Thorpe Bay. The tramway closed in 1942 after being superseded by the motorbus.

== Leisure ==
Thorpe Bay has one of Southend-on-Sea's exclusive golf courses, the Thorpe Hall Golf Club. Thorpe Bay Bowling Club and Lawn Tennis Club are close together on the north side of Thorpe Esplanade (the main road along the seafront). As well as these clubs, Thorpe Bay Yacht Club is also situated along the seafront, to the eastern end of Thorpe Bay. These clubs are private organisations open for annual membership. Thorpe Bay does not have a cinema, a theatre or any other major cultural amenities, but leisure organisations, in addition to those already mentioned, include Thorpe Bay Bridge Club, The Rotary Club of Thorpe Bay and a well-equipped fitness gym.

== Politics ==
James Duddridge MP, representing the Conservative Party, has been Thorpe Bay's member of parliament since 2005. Thorpe Bay is part of the Thorpe Ward of Southend-on-Sea. The ward currently has three independent councillors. These are Cllr Ron Woodley, Cllr Mike Stafford and Cllr Martin Terry.

== Schools ==
Thorpe Bay has a few schools, such as Bournes Green Infants and Junior School, which lies just above the Station Road northern boundary; and Thorpe Hall School, a non-selective, coeducational, private day school.

== Religion ==
There has been a church in Thorpe Bay since 1913. The three churches in Thorpe Bay include St. Augustine's Parish Church (Anglican) on St. Augustine's Avenue, designed in 1937 and built under the consultation of Sir Charles Nicholson; Thorpe Bay Methodist Church on The Broadway, whose architectural predecessor was erected in 1921; and St. Gregory's Roman Catholic Chapel of Ease, opened in 1928, which sits opposite the Methodist church on The Broadway.

== Notable residents ==
- James Duddridge, MP for Rochford and Southend East, lives in, and is MP for Thorpe Bay.
- Mark Foster, lived in Thorpe Bay and was educated at Alleyn Court School.
- Jim Peters, marathon runner, was a resident of Thorpe Bay until his death on 9 January 1999, aged 80.
- Rachel Riley, co-presenter on the Channel 4 gameshow Countdown, also lives in the area.
- Frederick Adam Wright, a Birkbeck College professor of Classics, was living at "Kalomba" in Thorpe Bay by 1921.
