= Frederick Adam Wright =

Frederick Adam Wright (16 February 1869 – 2 August 1946) was an English classical scholar known for his translations of Greek and Latin classics.

== Early life ==
Wright was born in Great Yarmouth, Norfolk, the second son of Adam John Wright and his wife Maria Jane. When he was baptized into the Church of England at the parish church of Gorleston, Suffolk, on 19 March, his father was described as a gentleman, of Southtown.

The young Wright was educated at Great Yarmouth Grammar School and Magdalene College, Cambridge.

== Career ==
Wright's early career was as a schoolmaster in Brighton and Mill Hill. From 1913 to 1935 he held the chair of Classics at Birkbeck College, which in 1920 became a college of the University of London.

== Personal life ==
On 31 July 1895, at St Peter's Church, Paddington, Wright married Ada Dee, spinster, of 39 Elgin Avenue, Maida Vale, a daughter of Alfred Dee, gentleman, of Tralee. Wright was described as a schoolmaster, of Mill Hill. They had three sons and two daughters. In 1899, a valuable marble clock was stolen from the family but was recovered.

At the time of the 1921 United Kingdom census, the Wrights were living at a house called Kalomba, in Thorpe Bay, Southend-on-Sea, and both daughters, Maisie, 17, and Alda, 8, were living at home. Wright had an easy journey to London from the Thorpe Bay railway station.

Wright retired to Falmouth, Cornwall, and died there on 2 August 1946.

== Selected publications ==
- The House on the Hill, and Other Poems (1916), a collection of his own poetry
- Letters from the Country and the Town (London: G. Routledge & Sons, 1922), a translation of letters of Alciphron
- The Girdle of Aphrodite (1923), a collection of love poems from the Palatine Anthology
- The Poets of the Greek Anthology (1924)
- The Lover's Handbook (1923), a translation of Ovid's Ars Amatoria
- 'Feminism in Greek Literature from Homer to Aristotle' (1923)
- Collected Poems of Meleager of Gadara (1924)
- Select Epigrams of Martial (1925)
- Three Plays of Plautus (London: G. Routledge & Sons, 1925)
- The Works of Liutprand of Cremona (1930)
- Select Letters of St. Jerome (Harvard University Press, 1933)
- A History of Later Latin Literature (London: G. Routledge & Sons, 1931)
- A History of Later Greek Literature from the Death of Alexander in 323 BC to the Death of Justinian in 565 AD (London: G. Routledge & Sons, 1932)
- Alexander the Great (London: G. Routledge & Sons, 1934)
- Organizer of Victory (1937), a biography of Marcus Agrippa
- Three Roman Poets (1938), an essay on Plautus, Catullus and Ovid

In addition, Wright edited and partially rewrote Thomas Underdown's Elizabethan translation of Heliodorus's Aethiopica.
