= Thorpe Bay railway station =

Railway station in Essex, England

Coordinates: 51.538°N 0.762°E

Thorpe Bay
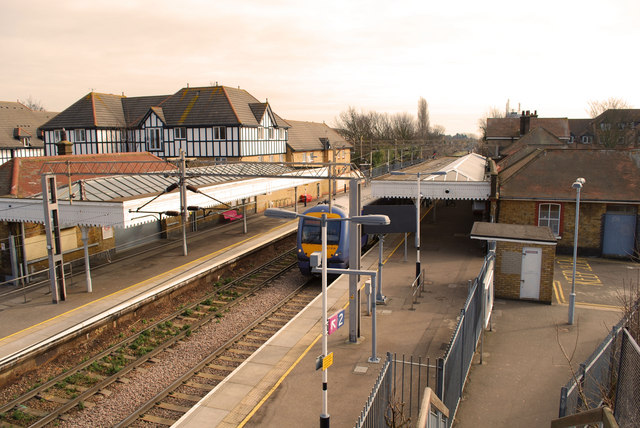

General information
- Location: Thorpe Bay, Southend-on-Sea; England
- Grid reference: TQ916857
- Manager: c2c
- Platforms: 2

Other information
- Station code: TPB
- Classification: DfT category D

History
- Original company: London, Tilbury and Southend Railway
- Pre-grouping: Midland Railway
- Post-grouping: London, Midland and Scottish Railway

Key dates
- 1 July 1910: Opened as Southchurch-on-Sea
- 18 July 1910: Renamed Thorpe Bay

Passengers
- 2020/21: ▼0.200 million
- 2021/22: ▲0.467 million
- 2022/23: ▲0.597 million
- 2023/24: ▲0.630 million
- 2024/25: ▲0.668 million
Location
Notes
- Passenger statistics from the Office of Rail and Road

Thorpe Bay railway station is on the London, Tilbury and Southend line, serving the Thorpe Bay area to the east of Southend-on-Sea, Essex. It is 37 miles 73 chains (61.0 km) down the main line from London Fenchurch Street via Basildon and is situated between Southend East and Shoeburyness. Its three-letter station code is TPB. The station and all trains serving it are currently operated by c2c.

== History ==
=== Early years (1910–1922) ===
As early as 1897, developers suggested a new station at Southchurch anticipating an eastward development of Southend much as Westcliff-on Sea railway station had been developed on the western side. Further attempts were made in 1899 and 1905 but it was not until 1908 that the LT&SR agreed with developer Thorp Park estate that a new station could be developed at a cost of £12,000 to the developer.

It was opened on 1 July 1910 by the London, Tilbury and Southend Railway (LT&SR) and was originally named Southchurch-on-Sea, being renamed Thorpe Bay on 18 July 1910. The station was renamed after the developer insisted as they had paid for the new station.

A signal box opened on the same day as the station and this was built by the London Signalling Company. It was provided with a 44 lever frame but only 26 levers were in use.

Just over two years later the LT&SR was taken over by the Midland Railway on 7 August 1912 so Thorpe Bay became a Midland Railway station. There were no houses near the station site and development was slowed by the outbreak of World War I in 1914. After hostilities ceased the area was developed more fully.

With the LTS line's main carriage sidings located at Shoeburyness, some trains departed as an ECS (empty coaching stock) train from Shoeburyness Carriage Sidings and formed passenger trains starting at Thorpe Bay. In the evening some services terminated there before running as an ECS service to Shoeburyness Carriage Sidings.

=== London, Midland & Scottish Railway (1923–1947) ===
Following the Railways Act 1921 the station became the responsibility of the London Midland and Scottish (LMS) Railway from 1 January 1923. From September 1939 to May 1945 passenger services were reduced as a result of World War II.

=== British Railways (1948–1994) ===
Following nationalisation of Britain's railways in 1948, the station transferred under British Railways to the London Midland Region. On 20 February 1949, the whole LTS line was transferred to the Eastern Region, yet despite the organisational changes, the old LTSR still was a distinctive system operated by former LTS and LMS steam locomotives until electrification.

During the late 1950s, the LTS was being electrified and re-signalled and the platforms at Thorpe Bay were both extended in 1957 to allow for 12-car operation. The signal box was closed on 16 October 1960 when the semaphore signalling was replaced by colour light signalling. The goods yard was at that point little used and a ground frame was provided for shunting of the remaining traffic. Electrification masts were installed as part of the electrification.

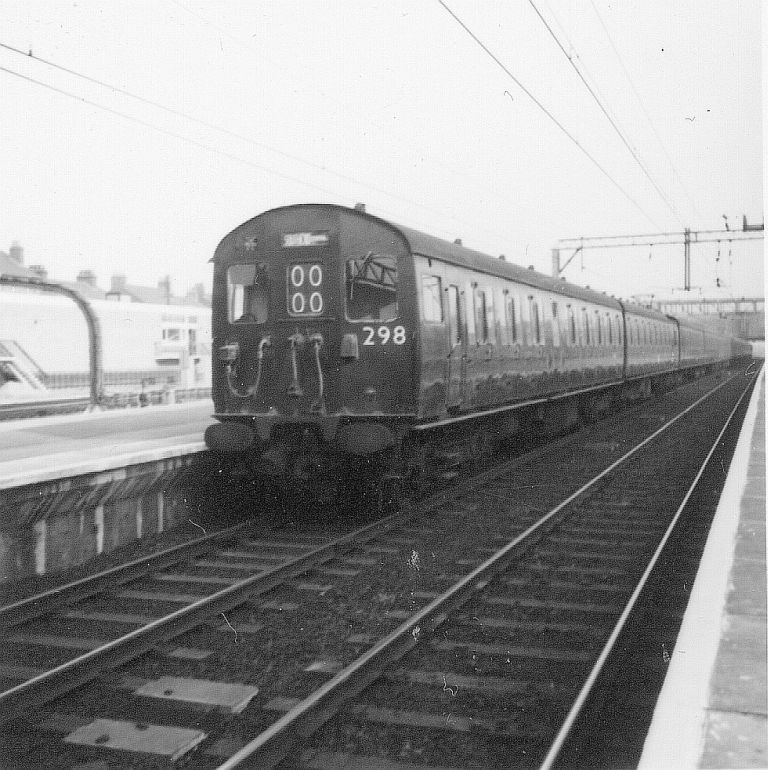
LTS unit (class 302) 298 1964 Barking

A full electric timetable started operating in June 1962 which was primarily worked by Class 302 EMUs.

The LTS line and Thorpe Bay station became part of the London and South Eastern sector of British Rail in 1982, and in June 1986 this was rebranded as Network South East (NSE). With the Conservative government of the early 1990s looking to privatise the railways, the operation of the NSE passenger train service was put under the control of a Train Operating Unit.

=== Privatisation era (1994–2025) ===
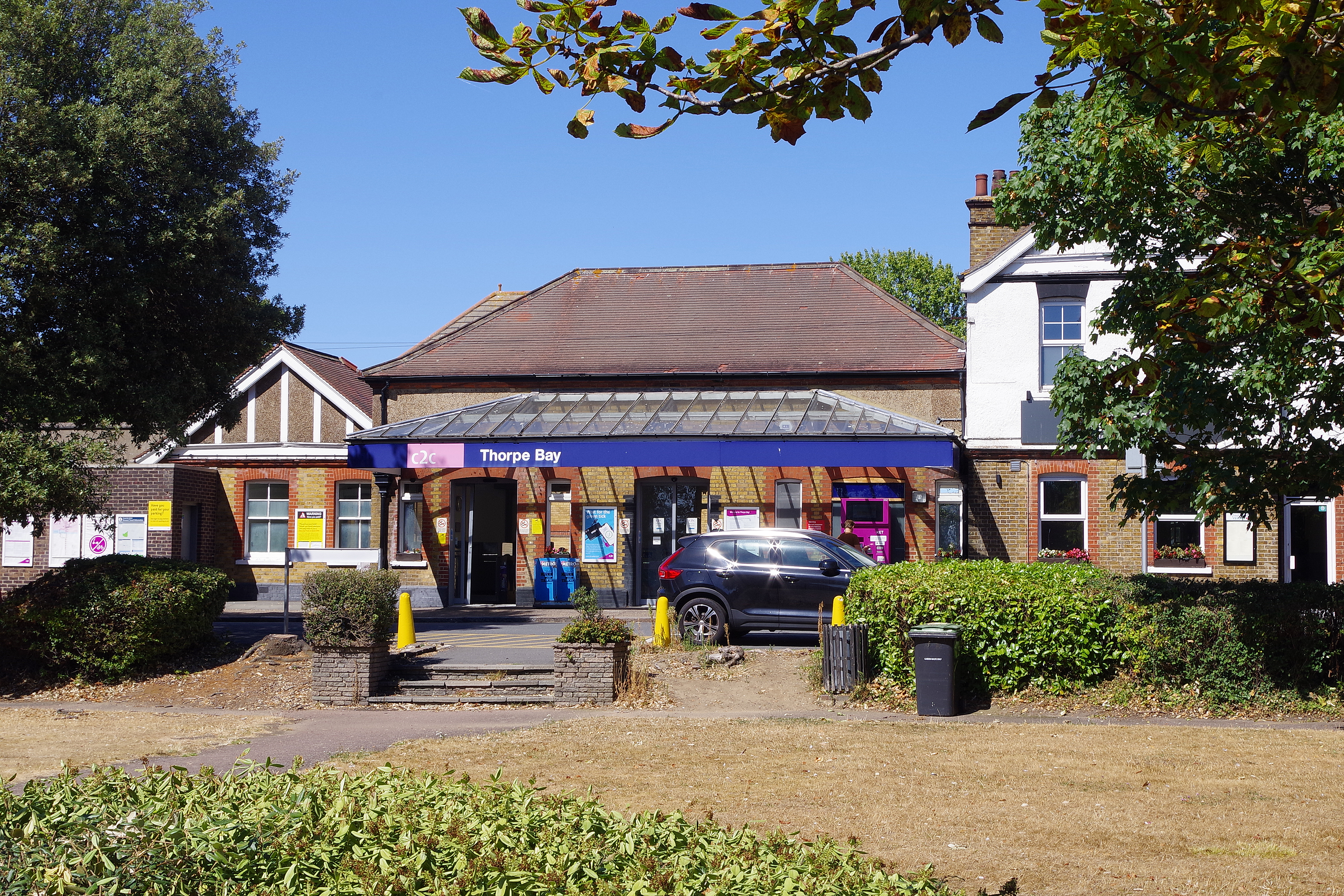
Thorpe Bay station exterior in 2022

On privatisation in 1994, infrastructure ownership passed to Railtrack and Prism Rail took over operations of the franchise, marketing the route as LTS Rail. Prism Rail were bought out by National Express in 2000 and in 2002 the line was rebranded as c2c.

Ownership of the infrastructure passed to Network Rail in 2002.

National Express sold the operation of the franchise to Trenitalia in 2017.

The station and all trains serving it are currently operated by c2c and are operated by Class 357 and Class 720/6 EMUs.

Private operation of the London, Tilbury and Southend line by Trenitalia c2c ceased on 20 July 2025, with the new publicly owned operator c2c taking over.

== Design ==
The station has two through platforms, which are connected by an overhead footbridge. Platform 1 is utilised by London-bound (up) trains, and Platform 2 is for (down) Shoeburyness trains.

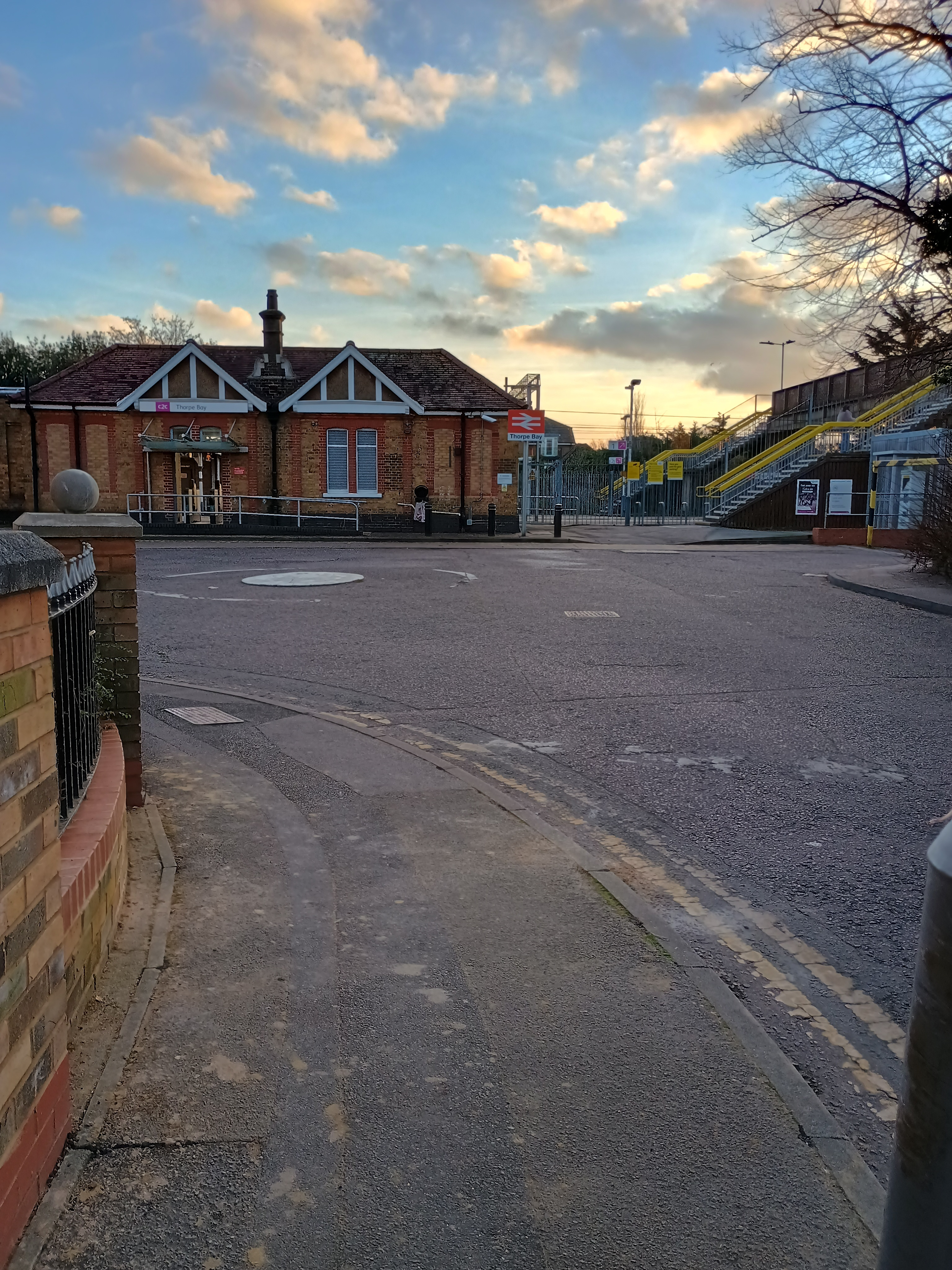
Thorpe Bay Railway Station northern entrance

== Services ==
=== Historic ===
The Whitechapel and Bow Railway, opened in 1902, permitted through trains to operate from the District Railway on to the LTSR. This was initially used for inner suburban District Railway trains that did not go beyond Upminster. In 1909 and 1910 trial joint through services were run from Ealing Broadway to Southend, changing from electric District to steam LTSR locomotives en route. This became a regular timetable in 1911, with a limited number of those daily trains extended to Thorpe Bay and Shoeburyness. The service ended on 11 September 1939.

In the July 1923 timetable, Thorpe Bay enjoyed a good train service with the first departure at 05:15 reaching Fenchurch Street at 06:43. The morning peak included a through service to Ealing whilst other services ran to Fenchurch Street. in the off peak there were tow or three trains in the morning and more or less Hourly services for the rest of the day. This dropped off in the evening as more trains then run from London. The last train to London Fenchurch Street was the 22:15 and the last train from Fenchurch Street was 22:40 although there was an 23:40 that ran via Tilbury and arrived in 01:06 in the morning. There was however a 10:30 service from Ealing Broadway that ran via the District Line and arrived back at Thorpe Bay at 00:36.

In the June 1962 all electric timetable, Thorpe Bay enjoyed six services per hour of which four were via Laindon and two were via Tilbury Riverside. Additional services ran in both peak hours but by this time all services were routed to Fenchurch Street.

=== Modern ===
As of the June 2024 timetable the typical Monday to Friday off-peak service in trains per hour (tph) is:

- 4 tph westbound to London Fenchurch Street via Basildon (2 tph all stations and 2 tph semi-fast)
- 4 tph eastbound to Shoeburyness.

=== Goods ===
Unusually for a station that was put in at the behest of a developer, a small two track goods yard was provided on the downside of the tracks behind and east of Platform 2. When the station was opened there were few properties in the area and a lot of the early traffic would have been building materials. Before opening, the sidings were used by the station contractor to receive materials for the platforms and buildings. A temporary ground frame was provided.

The mainline points to the goods yard was disconnected in May 1963 although an official date along with a lot of other goods yards in the area is stated as 5 July 1967. The final trains may have even run earlier as no calls were booked in the September 1962 freight working timetable.

Preceding station	National Rail	Following station
Southend East	c2c London, Tilbury and Southend line	Shoeburyness
Former services
Southend East	District—LMS through service London, Tilbury and Southend line	Shoeburyness
