= Southend Central railway station =

Railway station in Essex, England

Coordinates: 51°32′14″N 0°42′42″E

Southend Central
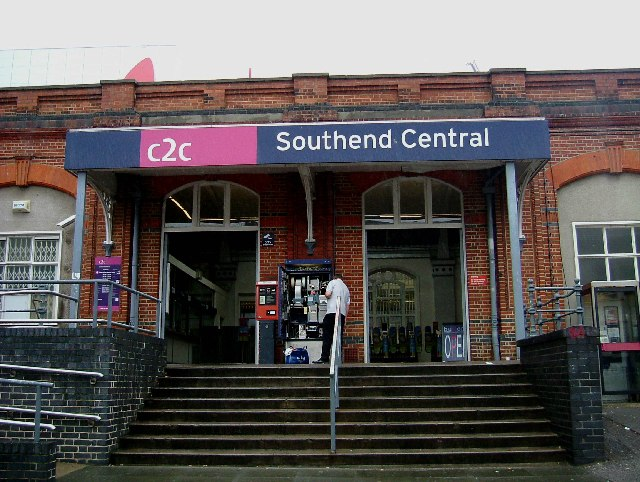

General information
- Location: Southend-on-Sea, City of Southend-on-Sea; England
- Grid reference: TQ881855
- Manager: c2c
- Platforms: 4

Other information
- Station code: SOC
- Classification: DfT category C1

History
- Opened: 1856

Passengers
- 2020/21: ▼0.906 million
- Interchange: 2,874
- 2021/22: ▲1.782 million
- Interchange: ▲4,940
- 2022/23: ▲2.041 million
- Interchange: ▼2,481
- 2023/24: ▲2.044 million
- Interchange: ▼1,491
- 2024/25: ▲2.242 million
- Interchange: ▲1,934
Location
Notes
- Passenger statistics from the Office of Rail and Road

Southend Central railway station is on the London, Tilbury and Southend line and is one of two primary stations serving the city of Southend-on-Sea, Essex. The city's other main station is called Southend Victoria which is the terminus of a branch line off the Great Eastern Main Line. Southend Central is 35 miles 55 chains (57.43 km) down the line from London Fenchurch Street via Basildon and it is situated between Westcliff and Southend East stations. Its three-letter station code is SOC. The station and all trains serving it are currently operated by c2c.

== History ==
=== London Tilbury & Southend Railway (1856–1912) ===
In June 1852, after several attempts at building a railway to Southend-on-Sea, royal assent was given to the London, Tilbury and Southend Extension Railway Act 1852 authorising the building of the London, Tilbury and Southend Railway. The line reached Southend in 1856 and whereas it had been planned to terminate opposite the pier, residents in The Royal Terrace opposed this, and the station was built further inland.

The Great Eastern Railway opened its station Southend Victoria on 1 October 1889 offering a route to Liverpool Street and competition for the LT&SR.

The terminus station was named Southend and was the eastern terminus of the line until 1888.

By 1872 the station area consisted of two terminating platforms, an engine shed (south of the station throat) with a turntable and a small goods yard (north and south of the platforms). A signal box was opened in 1881 when block section working was introduced to the line, the engine shed was extended and the south side of the station also was moved south and included additional goods sidings. In 1883 the goods shed was extended.

In 1884 with the line was extended to Shoeburyness and five years later the engine shed (despite being extended in 1881) was closed with new facilities being provided at Shoeburyness. Between 1884 and 1889 locomotives ran from Southend to Shoeburyness to form early morning up workings to London.

As commuter traffic took off in the 1890s two additional platforms were provided in 1894 and these were either side of the through platforms to Shoeburyness. The 1856 station buildings were demolished and new buildings were provided with the station forecourt occupying the site of the 1881 goods sidings.

In 1899 two more new platforms were opened on the south (up) side of the station and the other platforms widened to accommodate summer evening (day-tripper) crowds. All goods facilities were now concentrated on the down (north) side of the station which saw Railway Terrace shortened and some properties on the south side of Hamlet Road demolished.

The constrained site continued to provide challenges for the operating department especially on weekends and bank holidays when additional day tripper services were run. Additional goods sidings and carriage sidings known as Southend Sidings were provided half mile east of the station in 1908.

=== Midland Railway (1912–1922) ===
In 1912 the Midland Railway bought the LT&SR on 7 August 1912 so Southend-On-Sea became a Midland Railway station.

=== London Midland & Scottish Railway (1923–1948) ===
Following the Railways Act 1921 the station became the responsibility of the London Midland and Scottish (LMS) Railway from 1 January 1923.

In 1929 the goods shed on the down side was extended.

Just after World War II started in September 1939, the passenger service was reduced as a wartime economy measure. Early in the war a number of evacuation trains were run taking children to safer parts of the country as Southend was deemed to be one of the locations that would be bombed and possibly invaded.

The name was changed to Southend-on-Sea (Central) in 1946.

=== British Railways (1948–1994) ===
Following nationalisation of Britain's railways in 1948, the station transferred under British Railways to the London Midland Region. On 20 February 1949, the whole LTS line was transferred to the Eastern Region, yet despite the organisational changes, the old LTSR still was a distinctive system operated by former LTS and LMS steam locomotives until electrification.

During the late 1950s the LTS was being electrified and re-signalled and the opportunity was taken to rationalise Southend-on-Sea Central as the day tripper traffic had faded away. Work was undertaken on refurbishing the station buildings and platforms 1-4 extended to the west.

The whole pre-1954 track layout was changed between 1954 and 1959 and a new signal box at the station opened in 1960 replacing several local boxes. The area was now controlled by colour light signalling rather than mechanical semaphores.

A full electric timetable started operating in June 1962 which was primarily worked by Class 302 EMUs.

Southend Sidings were closed on 5 July 1967 but goods traffic at Southend Central continued in use to May 1970.

The station was renamed Southend Central on 20 February 1969.

Platforms 5 and 6 had their track removed in the early 1970s and were later demolished and replaced by car parking. These platforms were primarily used by day tripper trains and the traffic for these dried up in the 1960s with wider car ownership.

The LTS line and Southend Central station became part of the London and South Eastern sector of British Rail in 1982, and in June 1986 this was rebranded as Network South East (NSE). With the Conservative government of the early 1990s looking to privatise the railways, the operation of the NSE passenger train service was put under the control of a Train Operating Unit.

=== The Privatisation Era (1994–2025) ===
On privatisation in 1994, infrastructure ownership passed to Railtrack and Prism Rail took over operations of the franchise, marketing the route as LTS Rail. Prism Rail were bought out by National Express in 2000 and in 2002 the line was rebranded as c2c.

Ownership of the infrastructure passed to Network Rail in 2002.

National Express sold the operation of the franchise to Trenitalia in 2017.

The station and all trains serving it are currently operated by c2c and are operated by Class 357 and Class 720/6 EMUs.

A more detailed history of the franchises can be found on the c2c page.

Private operation of the London, Tilbury and Southend line by Trenitalia c2c ceased on 20 July 2025, with the new publicly owned operator c2c taking over.

== Description ==
Southend Central has four platforms:

- Platform 1 is a bay platform; trains may terminate at this formerly disused platform if platform 4 is not available for use or when engineering works are taking place between Southend Central and Shoeburyness; it has an operational length for 12-coach trains.
- Platform 2 is typically for eastbound services to Shoeburyness; it has an operational length for 12-coach trains.
- Platform 3 is typically for westbound services to London Fenchurch Street via Basildon; it has an operational length for 14-coach trains.
- Platform 4 is a bay platform typically for westbound services to London Fenchurch Street via either Ockendon or Rainham; it has an operational length for 12-coach trains.

In 1922 there were two other bay platforms and carriage sidings to the south of platform 4 and a goods shed and goods sidings to the north of platform 1. The bay platforms (5 and 6) were extant in 1981 although the track had been lifted. The area was subsequently redeveloped as a car park.

Facilities at the station include a partially sheltered bicycle storage rack and a car park. The ticket office has two serving positions, one of which is fully accessible, and uses the Tribute ticket issuing system.

Following the successful refurbishment of Benfleet railway station, c2c implemented a similar project at Southend Central. The work cost £460,000 and was jointly funded by c2c and Southend Borough Council. It involved the complete refurbishment of the ticket office and toilets and the construction of a new forecourt on the north side of the station (leading to platform 2) opposite the University of Essex Southend campus, with new steps and handrails on both sides of the canopy, and a new glass roof and lighting over the bicycle parking area. It was completed in 2007 after around four weeks of work.

There was formerly a through siding, provided with overhead line electrification, to the north of the down (Shoeburyness-bound) line between Southend Central and Southend East. This was still in use in 1969.

== Services ==
=== Historic services ===
In the November 1856 timetable the station was served by four trains per day operating from Fenchurch to Tilbury Riverside, where the train reversed, and then onto Southend. Similarly four trains operated in the other direction.

The North London Railway who ran a Sunday and Monday service from Chalk Farm to Tilbury to Southend between 1865 and 1881. Day tripper services from the NLR had been a regular feature before that.

The Great Eastern Railway operated through coaches to Southend between 1883 and 1897 (when the GER station opened).

A 1886 the faster route via Laindon was opened offering improved times to Fenchurch Street.

In 1896 Southend enjoyed a good service to Fenchurch Street with a morning 7.43 departure arriving at Fenchurch Street at 8.50 and an 8.05 Southend departure reaching Fenchurch Street at 9.17. In the off-peak one train per hour via Laindon was operated. In the evening peak the 5.15 Fenchurch Street departure arrived at Southend in 51 minutes.

The Whitechapel and Bow Railway, opened in 1902, permitted through trains to operate from the District Railway on to the LTSR. This was initially used for inner suburban District Railway trains that did not go beyond Upminster. In 1909 and 1910 trial joint through services were run from Ealing Broadway to Southend, changing from electric District to steam LTSR locomotives en route. This became a regular timetabled service in 1911, with a limited number of those daily trains extended to Shoeburyness. The service ended on 11 September 1939.

The Midland Railway starting running through services for London St Pancras from 1910. At the time capacity at Fenchurch Street was limited with the Great Eastern Railway running intensive suburban services. St Pancras was (and is) also convenient for the major stations of Kings Cross and Euston and this was shortly before the Midland bought the LT&SR in 1912. These services survived until 11 September 1939 when they were reduced due to the outbreak of World War II. Four services per day operated and these were cut back to Kentish Town in 1960 and ceased altogether on 16 June 1962.

From 1923 the LMS ran a single service each day to London Broad Street in the morning and returned in the evening. When improved Fenchurch Street services started in 1935 this service ran for the last time on 27 April 1935.

Services between Fenchurch Street and Southend were also reduced during World War II and the timing of these services was increased when the newer LMS locomotives were transferred away in 1941 and the older LTSR locomotive resumed their mainline passenger duties. After the war finished in 1945 the more powerful LMS tank engines returned and journey times were gradually improved.

The introduction of the June 1962 all electric timetable saw four services per hour in the off-peak. Two were via Laindon and the other two via Tilbury Riverside. In the morning peak there were 11 departures from Southend which would arrive in Fenchurch Street before 9.00. The 7.55 departure arrived at Fenchurch Street at 8.43 which took 48 minutes. In the evening peak there were 8 departures for Southend between 5.0 and 6.0 pm.

=== June 2024 ===
As of the June 2024 timetable the typical Monday to Friday off-peak service is:

- 4 tph (trains per hour) westbound to London Fenchurch Street via Basildon (2 tph all stations and 2 tph semi-fast)
- 2 tph westbound to London Fenchurch Street via Tilbury Town and Ockendon
- 4 tph eastbound to Shoeburyness.

Preceding station	National Rail	Following station
Westcliff	c2c London, Tilbury and Southend line	Southend East
Former services
Westcliff	District—LMS through service London, Tilbury and Southend line	Southend East
