= Shoeburyness Depot =

Railway maintenance depot in Shoeburyness, Essex

Shoeburyness Carriage Servicing Depot
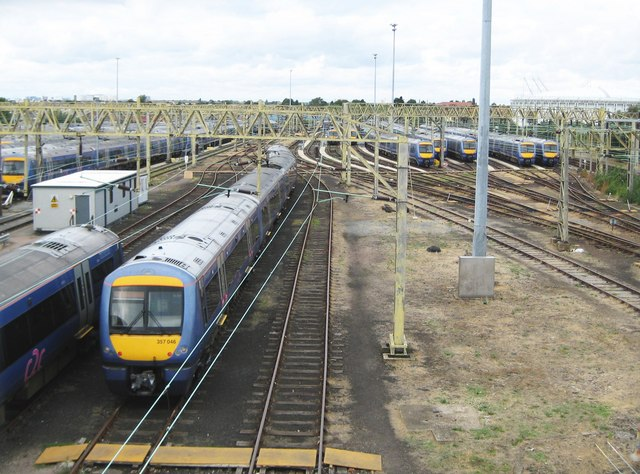
- A c2c Class 357 at the depot
- Interactive map of Shoeburyness Carriage Servicing Depot

Location
- Location: Shoeburyness, Essex
- Coordinates: 51.5315°N 0.7927°E
- OS grid: TQ938851

Characteristics
- Owner: c2c
- Type: EMU

Shoeburyness Carriage Servicing Depot is an Electric Traction Depot located in Shoeburyness, Essex, England. The depot is situated on the London, Tilbury and Southend line and is near Shoeburyness station. To the east of the depot is MoD Shoeburyness and there is a rail connection into that site from the depot.

== Steam-era shed ==
Prior to the electrification of the LTSR in the late 1950s/early 1960s, a steam engine shed was located at Shoeburyness. The line opened in 1884 and the shed five years later when the shed at Southend was closed. The shed was located on the north side of the station had two roads and was extended in 1896 and a third track added (with a lean-to timber shed) in 1898. Additional sidings space for coaling and locomotives was provided in the 1900s.

On the south (Up) side a fan of six carriage sidings was opened in 1910 to cope with the additional carriage sidings for increasing commuter traffic. A further three sidings were opened in 1916, and these sidings then formed the basis of today's EMU depot.

Throughout the steam shed's life, the main stay of its allocation was the tank engines used to work the passenger services and some freight trains. However, on weekends and bank holidays it was not unusual to find other companies locomotives on shed having worked a day tripper train in from elsewhere.

=== Electrification ===
The 1950s saw the London, Tilbury and Southend line earmarked for re-signalling and electrification. In connection with this scheme, the up sidings were electrified and Class 302 EMUs started operating some services in the December 1961 timetable. An all-electric timetable was introduced in June 1962, and the steam shed was closed on 18 June 1962 and demolished soon after.

The existing facility occupies the site of the up former carriage sidings.

== Allocation ==
As of 2026, the depot's allocation consists of c2c Class 357 EMUs and Class 720 EMUs.
