= Shoeburyness railway station =

Railway station in Essex, England

Coordinates: 51.531°N 0.795°E

Shoeburyness
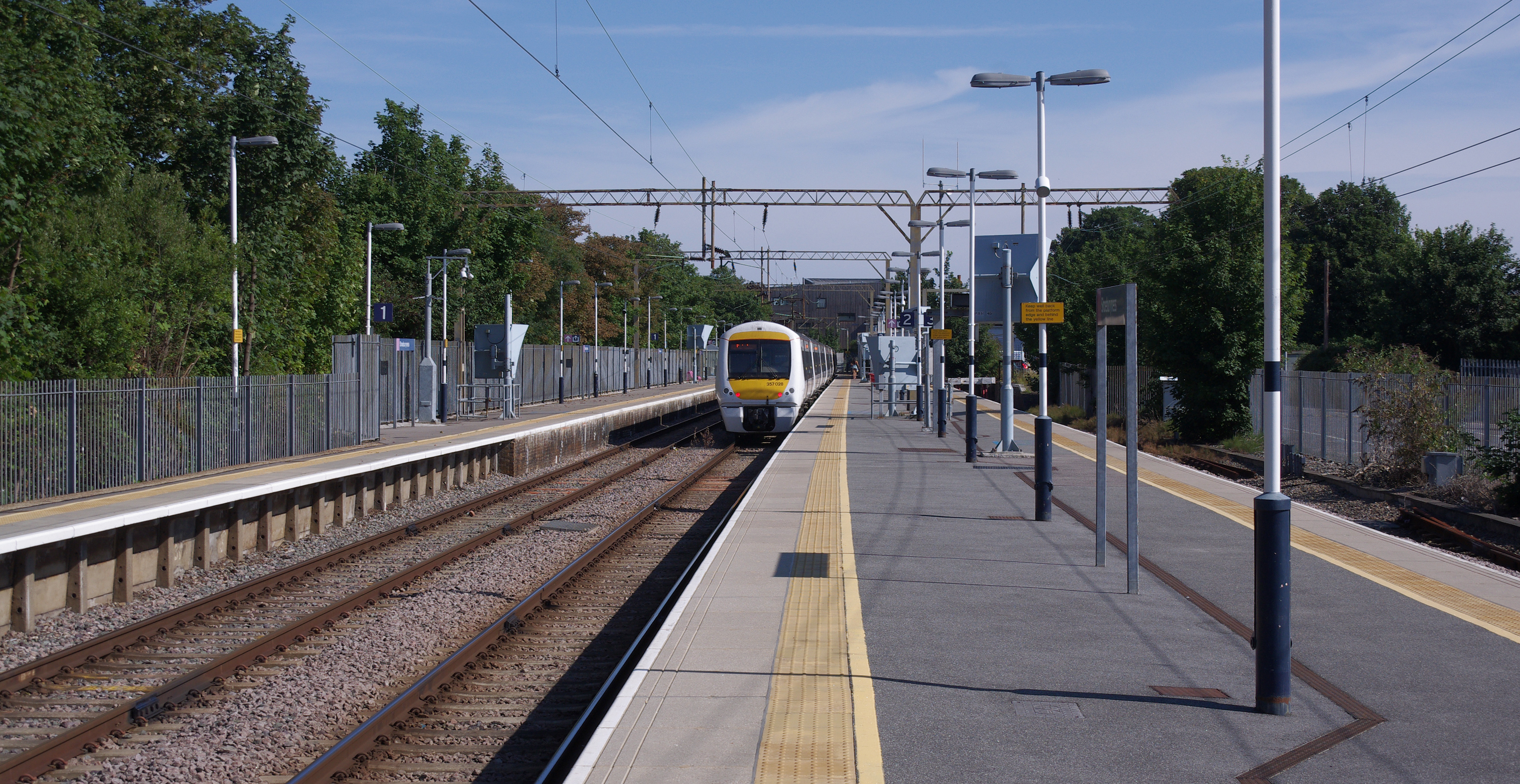

General information
- Location: Shoeburyness, Borough of Southend-on-Sea, England
- Grid reference: TQ939850
- Manager: c2c
- Platforms: 3

Other information
- Station code: SRY
- Classification: DfT category E

History
- Opened: 1884

Passengers
- 2020/21: ▼0.251 million
- 2021/22: ▲0.443 million
- 2022/23: ▲0.493 million
- 2023/24: ▲0.504 million
- 2024/25: ▲0.541 million
Location
Notes
- Passenger statistics from the Office of Rail and Road

Shoeburyness railway station is the eastern terminus of the London, Tilbury and Southend Line (Engineer's Line Reference FSS) serving the coastal town of Shoeburyness, in Essex, England. It is 39 miles 40 chains (63.57 km) down the main line from London Fenchurch Street, via Basildon; the preceding station is Thorpe Bay. Its three-letter station code is SRY.

The line and station were opened in 1884 when the London, Tilbury and Southend Railway extended east from Southend. The station and all trains serving it are currently operated by c2c.

== History ==
=== Early years (1884–1922) ===
In 1849, the Board of Ordnance purchased land at South Shoebury with a view to setting up an artillery testing and practice range. Until then, Plumstead Common and Woolwich Common had been used, but these were no longer viable due to the increasing power and range of the weapons.

A tramway was established on the site and was located south of the existing site. At this time, supplies for the military site arrived by river and three piers which were connected to a location called Camp Field. (Note: There is a Camp Field Road in modern Shoeburyness)

As early as 1855, Morton Peto, a partner in the London, Tilbury and Southend Railway, had suggested an extension from Southend to Shoeburyness. Two independent schemes foundered in 1866 and 1868; the LT&SR tried again in 1876, but found the War Department were not in favour of the scheme.

By the 1880s, the London, Tilbury and Southend Railway was beginning to outgrow its cramped site at Southend as the town grew and commuter traffic to London developed. In 1881, the War Department had a change of heart and had written a letter supporting the extension of the LT&SR to Shoeburyness. A contract to construct the line was let in 1882 and Shoeburyness railway station was opened to passenger and goods services on 1 February 1884. At that point, it was the only eastbound station after Southend, with Southend East and Thorpe Bay being added later.

In the first few years, no engine shed was provided at Shoeburyness so locomotives worked from Southend to form the early morning departures. This lasted until 1889, when Shoeburyness engine shed was opened. This move also freed up space at Southend Central to enable further development there.

=== London, Midland & Scottish (1923–1947) ===
Following the Railways Act 1921, the station became the responsibility of the London Midland and Scottish (LMS) Railway from 1 January 1923.

From September 1939 to May 1945, passenger services were reduced as a result of World War II. On 18 August 1940, the Midland Railway-designed signal box was hit by a bomb and destroyed; a replacement was provided the same year.

=== British Railways (1948–1994) ===
Following railway nationalisation in 1948, the station transferred under British Railways to the London Midland Region. On 20 February 1949, the whole LTS line was transferred to the Eastern Region; yet, despite the organisational changes, the old LTSR still was a distinctive system operated by former LTS and LMS steam locomotives until electrification.

During the late 1950s, the LTS was electrified and resignalled. This saw the remodelling of the throat of the station to give more operational flexibility, the provision of additional carriage sidings and the lengthening of others. New colour light signalling was installed and bought into service in October 1960 and a full electric service began in June 1962.

A full electric timetable started operating in June 1962, which was primarily worked by Class 302 electric multiple units.

The LTS line and Shoeburyness station became part of the London and South Eastern sector of British Rail in 1982; in June 1986, this was rebranded as Network SouthEast (NSE).

=== The privatisation era (1994–2025) ===
On privatisation in 1994, infrastructure ownership passed to Railtrack and Prism Rail took over operations of the franchise, marketing the route as LTS Rail.

=== Historic services ===
Shoeburyness has always enjoyed regular trains to the capital because, at the end of the line, it is where overnight stabling has taken place. Most trains were routed via Laindon rather than Tilbury.

In 1884, when the station started operation, nearly all London trains were extended to or from Shoeburyness and a few short workings between Shoeburyness and Leigh-on-Sea to fill in the gaps. Services were routed via Tilbury and, when the shorter route via Laindon opened on 1 July 1866, only five down and six up services were routed this way. In the 1890s, more trains were diverted via Laindon with a connecting Tilbury service at Pitsea.

The Whitechapel and Bow Railway, opened in 1902, permitted through trains to operate from the District Railway on to the LTSR. This was initially used for inner suburban District Railway trains that did not go beyond Upminster. In 1909 and 1910 trial joint through services were run from Ealing Broadway to Southend, changing from electric District to steam LTSR locomotives en route. This became a regular timetable in 1911, with a limited number of those daily trains extended to Shoeburyness. The service ended on 11 September 1939.

The all-electric timetable of June 1962 saw six trains in the weekday off-peak with two via Tilbury and two via Laindon.

=== Goods services ===
The goods yard was located immediately south of the station. Initially this was not connected to the military railway so any items for the base would have been unloaded here and moved by horse and cart the short distance to the base.

Public goods services ceased on 5 June 1967, although military trains continued to operate and indeed have a path in the May 2025 timetable, although they appear to run rarely if at all.

=== Pigs Bay military railway ===
A tramway was opened some time in the 1860s. Its main purpose was to move supplies and rail mounted artillery around the area south of what would become the station site.

The arrival of the LT&SR in Shoeburyness in 1884 did not seem initially to affect the military railway; it was not until 1890 that the two systems were joined south of the station. In 1890/1, the south end of the tramway was altered and the tramway extended north to a new platform on Pigs Bay. An exchange line was provided south of the carriage sidings allowing goods traffic to move to and from the Pigs Bay network.

Further northward extensions followed to Havengore Point in 1905 and a second parallel line slightly inland was constructed between 1906 and 1925; it was extended eventually to Havengore Island. A further new line was added c.1958 in the vicinity of the military engine shed.

In 1953, the site had 20 active steam and diesel shunting locomotives and also used some pre-grouping rolling stock for passenger duties.

Use of the site declined in the 1980s and, in the following decade, it was home to 400 items of ex-British Rail stock that were held in storage for some years. In 1991, the allocation consisted on three diesel shunters and two Baguely-Drewry Railcars for passenger use. (Note: One of these (AD9117) is preserved at the Llanelli & Mynydd Mawr Railway.)

=== Brickworks tramways and siding ===
Pre-dating the arrival of the LTSR, extensive brick fields existed north of the station area; a narrow gauge tramway operated which linked through to Shoeburyness East Beach, where there were further brickworks and where bricks were loaded into barges on piers. The tramway crossed the Pigs Bay branch on the level.

A siding on the north side of the Shoeburyness line was provided for main line brick traffic in 1895 and was known as Eastwood's Siding; it also dealt with traffic for the gas works. The connection from the station was removed during the 1950s.

The brick fields fell out of use in 1963, but it is not clear if the tramway ceased operation before then. Remnants of the tramway are still extant at East Beach.

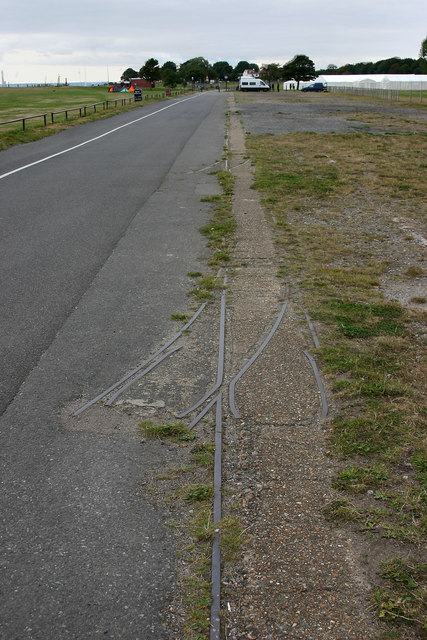
Former tramway at East Beach, Shoeburyness

== Layout ==
Shoeburyness is arranged in a through-station layout, despite being a terminus. As a result, the station has step-free access from the town's high street to all of its platforms. Platforms 1 and 2 have an operational length for 13-coach trains and platform 3 an operational length for nine-coach trains.

A connection exists to the Ministry of Defence site nearby at Pig's Bay, to the east over a level crossing on the high street, and extensive carriage sidings exist to the west comprising 31 sidings.

== Facilities ==
The ticket office is equipped with the Tribute ticket issuing system. The station has sheltered bicycle storage, a taxicab rank and a car park.

The station was renovated in January 2013 to improve customer safety, security and facilities for c2c customers.

== Services ==
The typical Monday to Friday off-peak service in trains per hour (tph) is:

- 4 tph westbound to London Fenchurch Street, via Basildon; of which
  - 2 tph stop at all stations
  - 2 tph are semi-fast.

All services are operated by c2c, which operates Class 357 Electrostar and Class 720 Aventra electric multiple units on the route.

== Notes ==
Preceding station	National Rail	Following station
Thorpe Bay	c2c London, Tilbury and Southend line	Terminus
Former services
Thorpe Bay	District—LMS through service London, Tilbury and Southend line	Terminus
