= C2c =

British state-owned train operating company

c2c

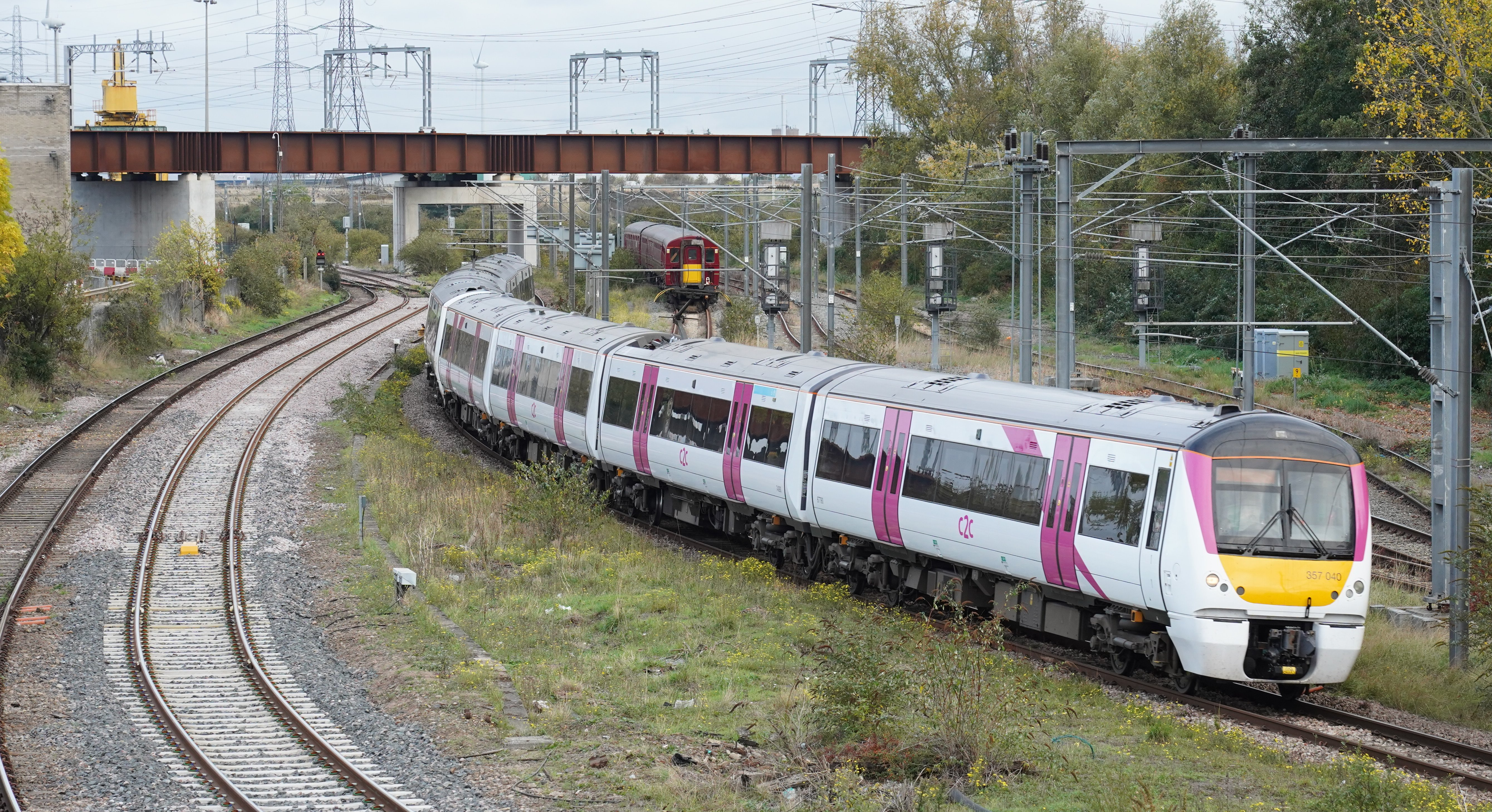
- Class 357 Electrostar near Barking

Overview
- Main regions: Essex; Greater London
- Fleet: Class 357 Electrostar; Class 720 Aventra
- Stations called at: 28
- Stations operated: 25
- Parent company: DfT Operator
- Headquarters: Lower Thames Street, London
- Reporting mark: CC
- Dates of operation: 20 July 2025–present
- Predecessor: Trenitalia c2c Limited

Technical
- Length: 125.5 km (78.0 miles)

Other
- Website: www.c2c-online.co.uk

c2c Railway Limited, trading as c2c and GBR Anglia, is a state-owned British train operating company, which runs services in East London and south Essex. It took over the operations from the Trenitalia-owned operator of the same name on 20 July 2025.

c2c is managed by a unified team, GBR Anglia, that includes neighbouring operator Greater Anglia and track operator Network Rail Anglia.

== History ==
In the lead up to the 2024 United Kingdom general election, the Labour Party of Keir Starmer committed itself to bring the passenger operations of the British rail network back under state ownership. Following the election of the Starmer government, it introduced the Passenger Railway Services (Public Ownership) Act 2024 that received royal assent in November 2024.

In December 2024, it was announced that the National Rail Contract with Trenitalia-owned operator c2c would not be renewed when it expired. On 20 July 2025, c2c services were taken over by the government-owned company DfT Operator.

In May 2026, GBR Anglia was established to unify the management of c2c with neighbouring operator Greater Anglia and track operator Network Rail Anglia.

== Services ==
c2c operates passenger services on the London, Tilbury and Southend line from Fenchurch Street in the City of London to Shoeburyness in Essex, a distance of 39 miles 40 chains (63.57 km). The main line operates via Basildon with a loop line via Tilbury and a branch line via Ockendon. c2c trains connect Central London with East London and the northern Thames Gateway area of southern Essex. The main route between Fenchurch Street and Shoeburyness has a fastest timetabled journey of 56 minutes.

Although the Class 357 Electrostar and Class 720 Aventra trains are capable of running at 100 mph (160 km/h), the line's speed limit restricts them to only 75 mph (121 km/h).

As of the May 2025 timetable, the off-peak Monday–Friday service is as follows:

London, Tilbury and Southend line
| Route | tph | Calling at |
|---|---|---|
| Fenchurch Street to Shoeburyness via Basildon | 4 | Limehouse, West Ham, Barking, Upminster, West Horndon (2 tph), Laindon, Basildon, Pitsea (2 tph), Benfleet, Leigh-on-Sea, Chalkwell, Westcliff, Southend Central, Southend East, Thorpe Bay |
| Fenchurch Street to Southend Central via Ockendon | 2 | Limehouse, West Ham, Barking, Upminster, Ockendon, Chafford Hundred Lakeside, Grays, Tilbury Town, East Tilbury, Stanford-le-Hope, Pitsea, Benfleet, Leigh-on-Sea, Chalkwell, Westcliff |
| Fenchurch Street to Grays via Rainham | 2 | Limehouse, West Ham, Barking, Dagenham Dock, Rainham, Purfleet |

=== Future services ===
Beam Park, a new station between Dagenham Dock and Rainham, will eventually be integrated into the Fenchurch Street to Grays via Rainham route when it opens.

== Fleet ==
The c2c fleet, all which was inherited from its predecessor, is maintained at East Ham Depot and Shoeburyness Depot.

| Family | Class | Image | Type | Top speed | | Number | Carriages | Routes operated | Built |
| Family | Class | Image | Type | mph | km/h | Number | Carriages | Routes operated | Built |
|---|---|---|---|---|---|---|---|---|---|
| Bombardier Electrostar | 357 | | EMU | 100 | 161 | 74 | 4 | London, Tilbury and Southend line | 1999–2002 |
| Alstom Aventra | 720/6 | | EMU | 100 | 161 | 12 | 5 | London, Tilbury and Southend line | 2022 |

== See also ==
- List of companies operating trains in the United Kingdom
