= Basildon railway station =

Railway station in Essex, England

Basildon
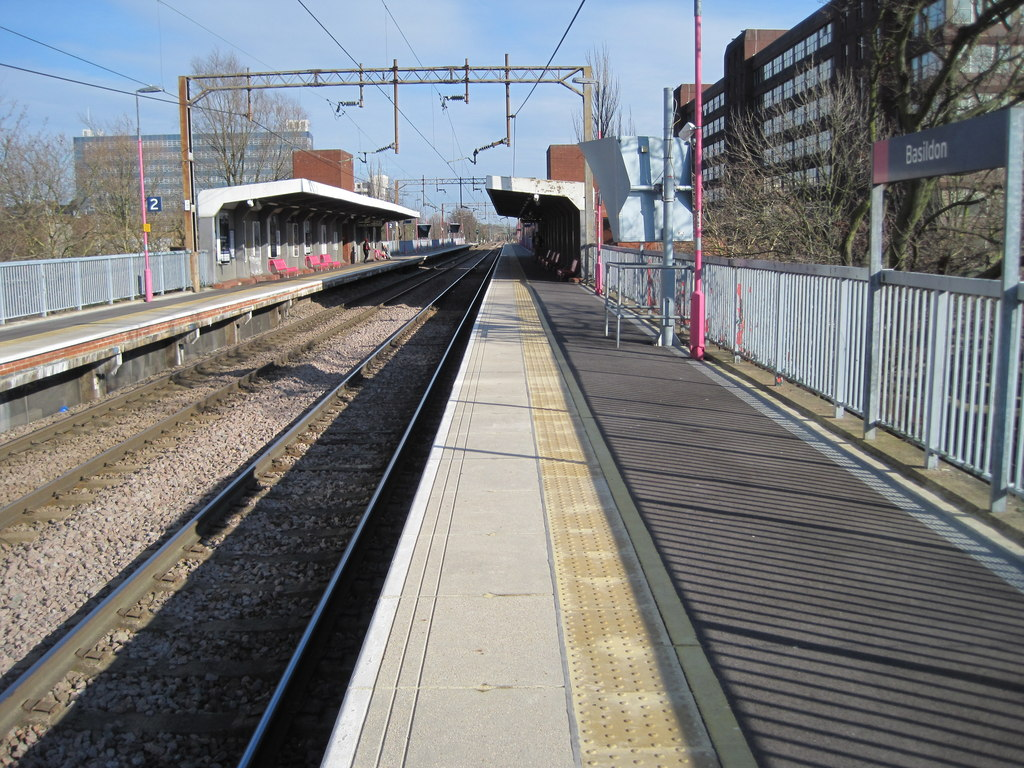

General information
- Location: Basildon, Borough of Basildon; England
- Coordinates: 51.5679°N 0.4566°E
- Grid reference: TQ703883
- Manager: c2c
- Platforms: 2

Other information
- Station code: BSO
- Classification: DfT category C2

History
- Opened: 25 November 1974
- Original company: British Rail

Passengers
- 2020/21: ▼1.065 million
- 2021/22: ▲2.024 million
- 2022/23: ▲2.394 million
- 2023/24: ▲2.431 million
- 2024/25: ▲2.567 million
Location
Notes
- Passenger statistics from the Office of Rail and Road

Basildon is a railway station on the London, Tilbury and Southend line, serving the town of Basildon, Essex. It is 24 miles 26 chains (39.1 km) down the main line from London Fenchurch Street and is situated between Laindon to the west and Pitsea to the east. Its three-letter station code is BSO. The station and all its trains are currently operated by c2c.

== History ==
The "Pitsea direct" line of the London, Tilbury and Southend Railway was opened between East Horndon and Pitsea on 1 June 1888 and allowed trains between London and Southend to avoid the longer route via Tilbury, significantly reducing journey times. Laindon station opened with the new line in 1888 and Pitsea, originally opened in 1855, became a junction station.

Basildon was designated a new town on 4 January 1949. Laindon and Pitsea stations fell within the new town boundary, albeit on the periphery. As was the case at other new towns, it took many years to deliver a railway station. Basildon station was opened by British Rail on 25 November 1974.

In September 2022, the down (towards Southend) platform was partially closed, preventing 12-carriage trains from calling at the station in that direction.

Private operation of the London, Tilbury and Southend line by Trenitalia c2c ceased on 20 July 2025, with the new publicly owned operator c2c taking over.

== Design ==
The station has two platforms, both located on the upper level.

The ticket hall houses a retail unit as well as self-service ticket machines. The ticket office has three serving positions.

== Services ==
Basildon is served by c2c trains westbound to Fenchurch Street in the City of London and eastbound to Shoeburyness in eastern Essex.

As of the June 2024 timetable the typical Monday to Friday off-peak service is:

- 4 tph (trains per hour) westbound to London Fenchurch Street (2 tph all stations and 2 tph semi-fast)
- 4 tph eastbound to Shoeburyness (2 tph all stations and 2 tph semi-fast)

Preceding station	National Rail	Following station
Laindon	c2c London, Tilbury and Southend line	Pitsea
