= Tribute (ticket) =

System information
- Full name: Tribute
- Machine type: Ticket office based
- Type of ticket stock: Hopper-fed
- Manufacturer: British Rail/SchlumbergerSema

History
- First introduced: 21 January 1994

Locations/areas/train operating companies

Tribute is one of the older generations of ticket issuing systems introduced to ticket offices by British Rail during the mid-1990s, prior to the privatisation of the network. PC-based, it is one of several systems trialled with the aim of replacing the aging APTIS system. The original systems was developed by British Rail Business Systems, and was first installed at London St Pancras on 21 January 1994. By April 2005, around 250 terminals were in use Following privatisation, development and support was provided to the train operating companies (TOCs) by SchlumbergerSema, until they were bought by Atos in 2004.

Since the system was launched the software has undergone several major updates – release version 15 was use in ticket offices.

Today the Tribute software is owned by Atos after acquisition of the system in 2011. Development is guided by representatives from a number of TOCs, and several industry call centres. Development and systems integration work is undertaken by Atos.
