= Prism Rail =

1995–2000 British passenger rail company

Prism Rail plc
- Industry: Transport
- Founded: July 1995
- Defunct: 19 September 2000
- Fate: Takeover
- Successor: National Express
- Products: Rail transport

Prism Rail was a British passenger rail company formed in July 1995 to bid for rail franchises in the United Kingdom during the privatisation of British Rail. It expressed interest in eighteen franchises, was shortlisted for twelve and was ultimately awarded four, LTS Rail, Valley Lines, Wales & West, and West Anglia Great Northern.

== History ==
Prism Rail was established by a number of individuals from the private bus industry with the intention of securing one or more of the passenger rail franchises that were being created by the privatisation of British Rail. In order to finance its bid for its first franchise, the company secured external backing, initially from a small number of institutional investors and subsequently via the company's listing on the Alternative Investment Market in May 1996. During January 1997, Prism Rail was forced to abandon a £30 million bonus share scheme intended for its management after several of the company's investors expressed their dissatisfaction, with some claiming it to have been excessively generous.

In May 1996, it was announced that the Director of Passenger Rail Franchising had awarded the London, Tilbury and Southend franchise to Prism Rail for a period of 15 years; operations of LTS Rail commenced later that same month. The terms of franchise included its potential to be curtailed to only seven years if the operator did not fulfil bid commitments to replace the existing rolling stock with new trains. Accordingly, during 1997, Prism Rail placed an order valued at £92 million with the multinational rolling stock manufacturer Adtranz for the production of 44 Class 357 "Electrostar" EMUs.

In its bid for the West Anglia Great Northern (WAGN) franchise, Prism Rail promised that it would make a premium payment of £24.8 million to the franchising office in 2004. During December 1996, it was announced that the company had been awarded a seven year concession to operate the WAGN franchise; it was the fourth awarding of a passenger train franchise to Prism Rail by that time. By 1999, according to statistics compiled by the Office of Passenger Rail Franchising, West Anglia Great Northern was amongst the best performing franchises, being one of only seven franchises to obtain a B grade, for which its average punctuality had to be above 90 per cent while its average reliability figures had to be exceed 99 per cent. In July 2000, the company had agreed to invest £20.5m into the network, and had reported that the Great Northern portion of the franchise' operations were running at a profit.

In July 2000, Prism Rail was purchased by the British transport specialist National Express. The integration of the two companies was formally completed on 19 September 2000.

On 2 July 2000, LTS Rail was rebranded as c2c. In March 2001, National Express combined the management and support functions of c2c, Silverlink, WAGN, and Stansted Express in a single organisation called London Lines.

During October 2001, the company's two franchises in Wales, Valley Lines and Wales & West, were reorganised, after which the new Wales & Borders franchise assumed responsibility for the majority of services in Wales as shown on its map. On 1 August 2003, in spite of National Express's bid to retain it, the Strategic Rail Authority awarded the new franchise to Arriva UK Trains.
