= Rainham railway station =

Rainham railway station may refer to the following stations in England:

- Rainham railway station (London), also known as Rainham (Essex), on the London, Tilbury and Southend Railway line
- Rainham railway station (Kent), on the Chatham Main Line
