= Purfleet Rifle Range railway station =

Former railway station in Essex, England

Purfleet Rifle Range

General information
- Location: Purfleet, Thurrock; England
- Coordinates: 51.4920°N 0.2327°E
- Grid reference: TQ553793
- Platforms: 3

Other information
- Status: Disused

History
- Original company: London, Tilbury and Southend Railway
- Pre-grouping: Midland Railway
- Post-grouping: London, Midland and Scottish Railway; London Midland Region of British Railways; Eastern Region of British Railways

Key dates
- 1911: Opened to goods and military personnel
- October 1921: Opened to passengers
- 31 May 1948: Closed to passengers
Location

Purfleet Rifle Range was a railway station on the London, Tilbury and Southend Railway. It was opened for military use in 1911 and public use in 1921 and closed in 1948. It was located between Purfleet and Rainham railway stations.

== History ==
=== Early years (1854–1922) ===
The railway through the station site opened on 13 April 1854 and crossed a road called Ordnance Way (later Tank Hill Road). A level crossing was provided along with a crossing house as the London, Tilbury and Southend Extension Railway Act 1852 (15 & 16 Vict. c. lxxxiv) enabling the railway specified there must be signals at this location so "the railways must stop trains when there are troops crossing". At that point Ordnance Way led down to the River Thames where a large gunpowder magazine had been established during the later part of the 18th century.

In 1863, a siding was installed for the receipt of manure (from London's streets) and agricultural products. In 1894, a signal box called Ordnance Crossing was opened replacing the previous arrangements. The War Department created the rifle ranges in 1906

A further siding was provided on the up side upon a request from the War Office which opened in April 1909. This was provided with a run round loop for remarshalling trains and led to a transhipment shed where the ammunition was loaded onto road vehicles or the military narrow gauge railway.

Later the same year the War Office applied for a station to be built which the LT&SR had assumed would be open for the public. The War Office were not so keen so plans were scaled back.

In connection with the new station a signal box called Purfleet Rifle Range was opened on 5 February 1910.

The station had two platforms on opening in either 1911 or 1912 which were staggered due to the existing agricultural siding on the down side. A footbridge was provided at the west end of the station and that is where the exit was. This had a Booking Office, staff room and toilets. In 1915 a third (up bay) platform was added.

Special stop orders were requested by the military to stop service trains at the station but a number of specials that terminated or originated from there ran as well. At the beginning of World War I the military could stop any train they required.

The station became a Midland Railway station in 1912 when they took over operation of the LT&SR and in 1921 the station was opened for public use with the station appearing as Purfleet Rifle Range Halt in Bradshaw's timetable guides from October 2021.

=== London Midland and Scottish Railway (1923–1948) ===
During World War II the station buildings were damaged by a V2 rocket on 10 February 1945 and had to be closed until 12 February.

=== British Railways (1948) ===
Following nationalisation of Britain's railways in 1948, the station transferred under British Railways to the London Midland Region. On 20 February 1949, the whole LTS line was transferred to the Eastern Region, yet despite the organisational changes, the old LT&SR still was a distinctive system operated by former LT&SR and LMS locomotives until electrification.

The station was closed on 31 May 1948 and was the first station closed by British Railways. The buildings were soon demolished although the foundations of the platforms were still extant in 1986.

The sidings continued in use for a short period with coal delivered to the down side siding in July 1952. The military siding was still listed in the 1956 station directory but no exact closing date is known. It is possible both the up & down sidings and the bay platform were removed as part of the 1960 re-signalling.

=== Since closure ===
The signal box was updated to work colour signals as part of the lines re-signalling and electrification in 1960/1961. A new Up Goods Loop was laid west of the station opening on 24 July 1961. This only lasted 4 years closing in 1965.

The level crossing was updated in 1980 with automatic barriers and the signal box was closed on 31 August 1980 with Purfleet signal box monitoring the crossing by CCTV. The level crossing was later closed and replaced by an overbridge which crosses over the old station site.

The rifle range closed in the 1990s and the site was sold to the Royal Society for the Protection of Birds in 2000.

The High Speed 1 railway line was built immediately north of the station site opening on 14 November 2007.

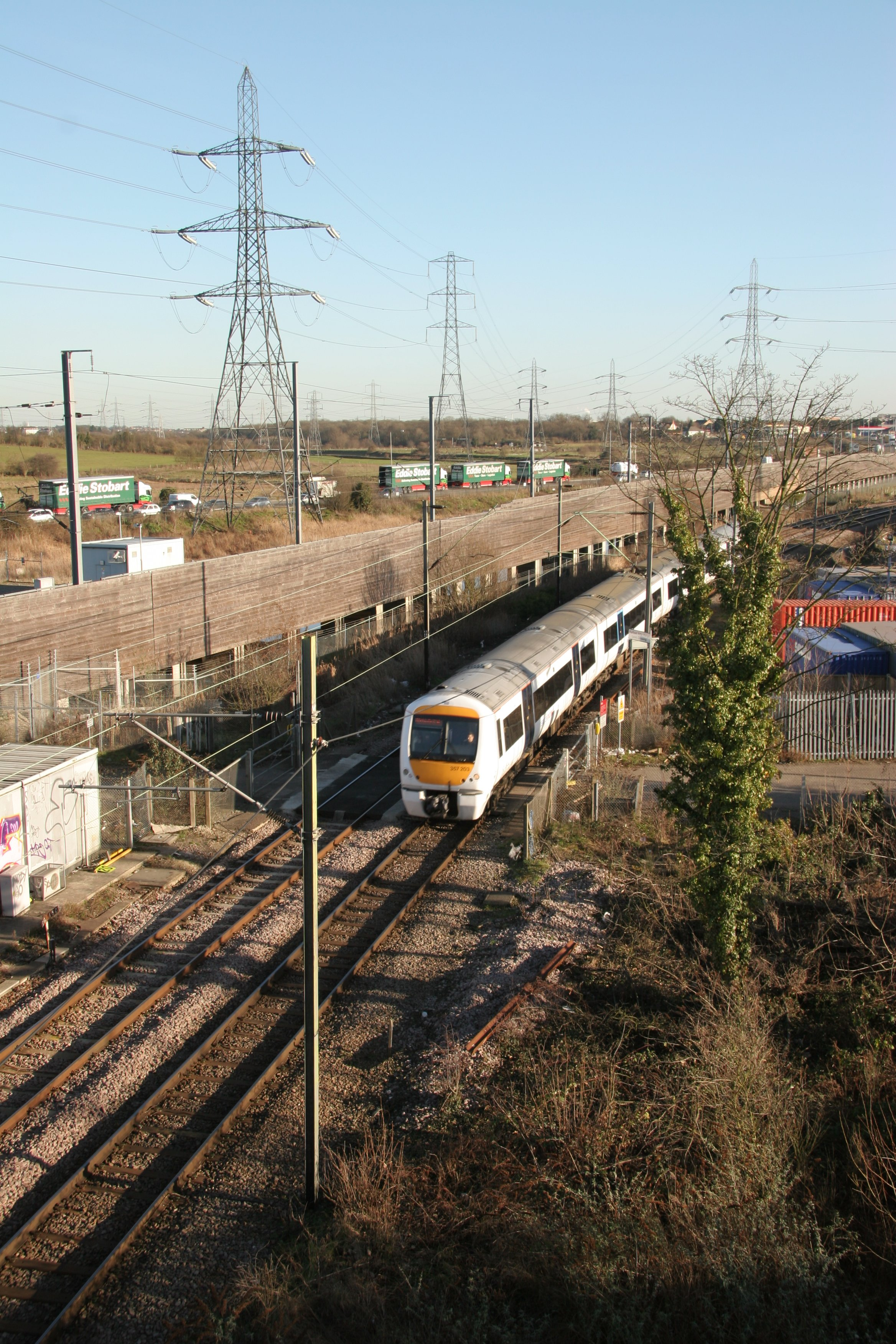
Class 357 209 Electrostar Tank Lane Crossing near Purfleet LTS - HS1 is behind the fence and the site of the station below the bridge the photographer is standing on.

Preceding station	Historical railways	Following station
Rainham; Line open, station open	London, Tilbury and Southend Line; London Tilbury and Southend Railway	Purfleet; Line open, station open
