= Grays railway station =

Railway station in Essex, England

Grays
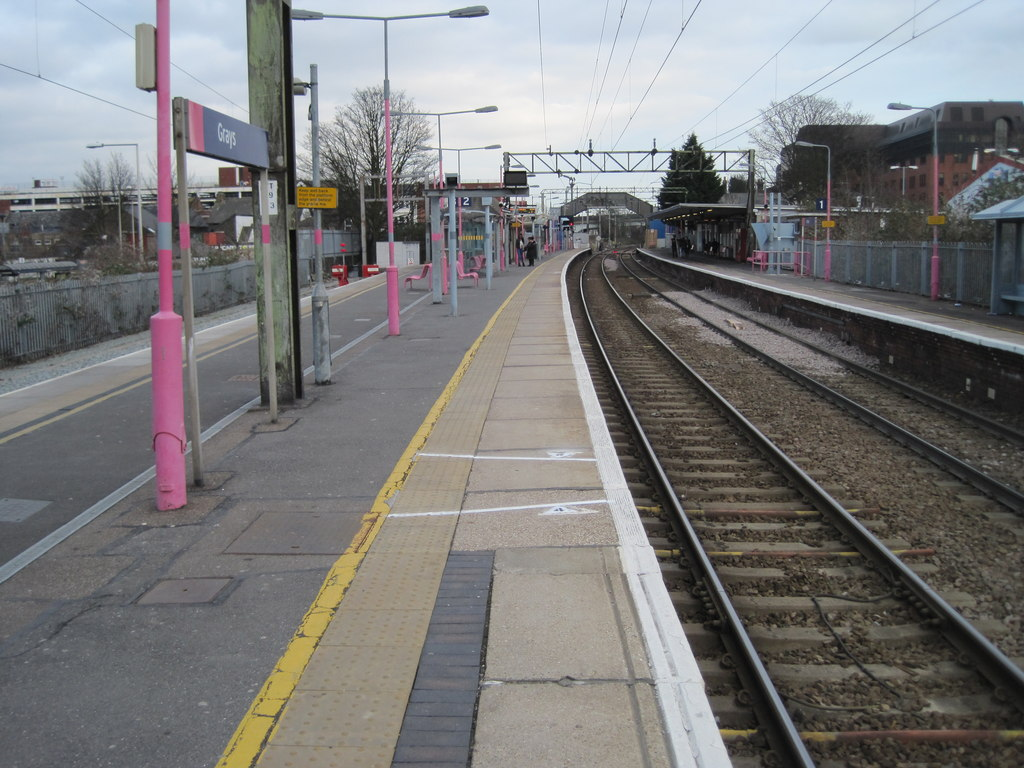
- Main building, Southend-bound side
- Interactive map of Grays

General information
- Location: Grays
- Local authority: Thurrock
- Managed by: c2c
- Owner: Network Rail
- Station code: GRY
- DfT category: C2
- Number of platforms: 3
- Accessible: Yes
- Fare zone: A

National Rail annual entry and exit
- 2020–21: ▼1.456 million
- Interchange: ▼58,113
- 2021–22: ▲2.669 million
- Interchange: ▲0.102 million
- 2022–23: ▲3.087 million
- Interchange: ▼0.101 million
- 2023–24: ▲3.495 million
- Interchange: ▲0.109 million
- 2024–25: ▲3.586 million
- Interchange: ▼0.106 million

Key dates
- 1854: Opened

Other information
- External links: Departures; Facilities
- Coordinates: 51.476°N 0.322°E

Grays railway station is on the London, Tilbury and Southend line, serving the town of Grays, in Essex, England. It lies 19 miles 70 chains (32.0 km) down the line from London Fenchurch Street, via Rainham; it is located at the junction where a branch line from Upminster via Ockendon rejoins the route from Rainham.

The station and all trains serving it are currently operated by c2c. Although outside the London fare zones, the station became part of the Oyster card pay-as-you-go network in 2010.

== History ==
=== Early years 1854–1922 ===
The station was opened as Grays Thurrock on 13 August 1854 on the London, Tilbury and Southend Railway's line to Tilbury, which had opened a few months earlier.

Initially, the station had two platforms with station buildings and a goods yard on the up side west of the station. Crossing the tracks was via a level-crossing at the east end of the station.

In the 1880s, the town of Grays was increasing in population and the LT&SR recognised the need for improved facilities. In 1882, a footbridge was provided at the east end of the station; it could be used by pedestrians when the level crossing gates were closed, as the town had spread to both sides of the railway.

The rebuilding of the station took place in 1885 and 1886, with a new station building provided west of the original building, which was subsequently demolished. The goods yard was extended westward and southward at this time and a replacement goods shed was provided.

A new bay platform was provided at the west end of the station ahead of the service to Upminster, commencing in 1892. The line from Upminster joined the main line at West Thurrock Junction, which is just under a mile to the west of Grays station. Between West Thurrock Junction and Grays station, there were a number of private sidings.

In the early 1900s, the station became known as Grays. The original settlement had been south of the railway, but had expanded and now included houses and shops north of the railway. By the end of the 19th century, road traffic increased over the High Street level crossing at the east end of the station and gave rise to a number of complaints. This remained a problem until 1975.

The Midland Railway took over the LTSR and its stations on 7 August 1912.

=== London, Midland and Scottish Railway (1923–1948) ===
Following the Railways Act 1921, the station became the responsibility of the London, Midland and Scottish (LMS) Railway from 1 January 1923.

Some of the cement factories had closed early in the 1920s, but the area remained a busy location for goods traffic.

Once World War II had started, there were significant cuts to passenger services on the line in the timetable of 25 September 1939. On 15 March 1941, the up side station building suffered a direct hit by a bomb and was damaged beyond repair.

=== The nationalisation era (1948–1994) ===
Following nationalisation of Britain's railways in 1948, the station transferred under British Railways to the London Midland Region. On 20 February 1949, the whole LTS line was transferred to the Eastern Region yet, despite the organisational changes, the old LTSR still was a distinctive system operated by former LTS and LMS locomotives until electrification.

In 1954, a new upside station building was provided, which had a pre-cantilevered roof made of pre-stressed concrete. The roof acted as a cover for the front of the station and a shelter on the platforms; it is still extant in 2025.

Resignalling of the area prior to electrification occurred and the Grays West signal box was closed; simplification of some of the goods yard infrastructure was also carried out. Most notably, a third reversible line was introduced between West Thurrock Junction and the station, meaning that no interaction with main line services was now required. This became operational on 28 August 1961.

The branch to Upminster remained steam operated until January 1958, when diesel multiple units took over operation. In November 1961, the Grays to Upminster branch was electrified; a full electric timetable started operating in June 1962 and this was primarily worked by Class 302 electric multiple units (EMUs).

In 1968, the former Seabrook Brewery siding area was adapted as the new route to the Port of Tilbury, which had opened a new Freightliner terminal.

In the early 1970s, the historic town centre was demolished under the Thurrock Urban District Council plan and the High Street level crossing was replaced by a foot crossing in 1975. A new overbridge had been provided for the road traffic.

The LTS line and Purfleet station became part of the London & South Eastern sector of British Rail in 1982; this was rebranded to Network SouthEast (NSE) in June 1986. With the Conservative government of the early 1990s looking to privatise the railways, the operation of the NSE passenger train service was put under the control of a train operating unit.

=== Privatisation era (1994–2025) ===
On privatisation in 1996, infrastructure ownership passed to Railtrack and Prism Rail took over operations of the franchise, marketing the route as LTS Rail.

In 2005, the station environment was refurbished; this included the subway linking the platforms and the surrounding highway infrastructure. In January 2006, the footbridge linking Grays High Street at either side of the railway was declared unsafe and was closed due to structural problems with the supports and bracing; these had to be temporarily supported with scaffolding underneath the stair flights. A hoarding was subsequently erected on this scaffolding. The footbridge reopened in May 2006. Works to replace the stair flights have been completed. Although located at the end of the platforms, there is no station access at this point.

During 2008 and 2009, the four-carriage bay platform was extended to hold eight-coach trains. In 2011–12, the through platforms were extended to receive 12-coach trains.

=== Signal boxes ===
West to east, signal boxes after the branch to Upminster were:

- West Thurrock Junction (c.1890)
- Grays West (opened 5 November 1901)
- Grays East (opened 5 November 1901).

The latter two boxes replaced the original 1881 box and were linked to changes at the station with regard to the new bay platform.

Resignalling in 1961 saw Grays West box closed and all activity concentrated on Grays East, which was close to the High Street foot crossing, east of the station. This box had control of the new route to the Port of Tilbury via the Seabrooks Brewery siding alignment started in 1968.

In 1996, control transferred to the Upminster signalling centre which controls the former LT&S system. A few minor changes to the remaining infrastructure were made as part of this change; Thurrock West Junction and the remaining Grays box closed on 3 April 1996.

=== Private sidings ===
West Thurrock Junction to Grays was a busy area for goods traffic, with a number of private sidings serving riverside industries. These are listed west to east starting at West Thurrock Junction and ending at the present junction for the Port of Tilbury.

Two cement works existed alongside each other. The western one was Thames Works owned by the Thames Cement Company. This was taken over by APCM in 1900, but closed in 1920. Chalk came from a quarry north of the railway that went under the main lines, but a connection was not provided. Thames Works had an internal railway system.

After closure in 1920, the site was purchased by the Thames Land Company and a large soap works called Hedleys was built. This was connected to West Thurrock Yard on 23 January 1938 and three sidings provided. The old internal railway was reused and that ceased operation in 1955. The site became known as Procter & Gamble's sidings in the 1960s and fell out of use in the 1990s.

Wouldham Works was a large cement works, located between the main line and the River Thames. It opened in 1874 as the Lion Cement Works and was bought by the Wouldham Cement Company, which operated the site until 1911 when Blue Circle Cement acquired it.

Chalk was supplied to the site via a railway line from a quarry north of the railway line; this line passed under the main line, and later the Upminster branch, immediately west of West Thurrock Junction. The works was connected to the main line on 29 December 1902 and there were a number of sidings for inward and outward traffic, which was primarily coal (inwards) and cement products (outwards). The latter also left on barges from the wharf on the River Thames.

There was an internal rail system worked by a number of steam, and later diesel locomotives, which moved materials around the works, from the quarries to/from the sidings and to the wharves. The railway from the quarry was replaced by a conveyor in the early 1960s, but the internal railway still continued operating on site.

The works closed in 1976 and the main line connections were removed in the 1996 resignalling project.

Paktank Sidings were a relatively late addition and sited on the down side on the third line between West Thurrock Junction and Grays station. There were three sidings the site, later known as Unitank Storage; the site closed in the 1990s.

A third cement works called Grays Portland Cement Works existed and was supplied by two quarry lines both of which passed under the main line. There was a rail connection at Grays station on the down side, but most material arrived or left by barge by one of the company's two jetties. The works had an internal rail system and closed in c.1922.

There were two sidings that ran off the station goods yard and, at various times, these served a timber yard (shown as railway sleeper wharf on maps), Grays Engineering Works and T.W. Ward shipbreakers (which also scrapped some steam locomotives in the 1960s). The latter was the last private siding in use at Grays with the site closing in 1983.

Sited east of the station, Seabrooks Brewery had a siding, on what was then the edge of town. The brewery was established in 1799 and closed in 1929 when Charringtons acquired Seabrooks. The siding was opened in 1901, although the plan for the area had been to establish four tracks to Tilbury East Junction and the Port of Tilbury yard.

After that, the brewery was bought by the Co-operative Society; it became a laundry and dairy. In the 1960s, the site was being used as a rail-served coal depot which closed in the mid 1960s; the sidings were reused as new rail access to Tilbury Docks in 1969.

The reason the additional two tracks were not built in 1901 was as a result of a standard gauge railway that went over the tracks to the east of Seabrooks. Formerly a quarry line to the river, the line was then owned by Charles Wall, who was a building contractor and hired out industrial locomotives. A siding was built and opened in 1901 that connected to the Seabrooks area, but neither the LT&SR or Wall wanted to pay for a new wider bridge to accommodate the two new tracks. The rail bridge was converted to a road bridge in 1941 to provide better access to Tilbury Docks and the rail connection was removed.

== Service ==
c2c operates all services at Grays; the typical off-peak service in trains per hour (tph) is:

- 2 tph westbound to London Fenchurch Street, via Ockendon
- 2 tph westbound to Fenchurch Street, via Rainham
- 2 tph eastbound to Southend Central.

Services are operated by Class 357 and Class 720/6 EMUs.

== Bus connections ==
Ensignbus, First Essex and NIBS Buses operate local bus routes that connect the station with the town centre, Basildon, Brentwood, Purfleet and Lakeside shopping centre.

Preceding station	National Rail	Following station
Chafford Hundred via Ockendon	c2c London, Tilbury and Southend line	Tilbury Town
Purfleet via Rainham	c2c London, Tilbury and Southend line	Tilbury Town
