= London, Tilbury and Southend line =

Commuter railway line in Essex, England

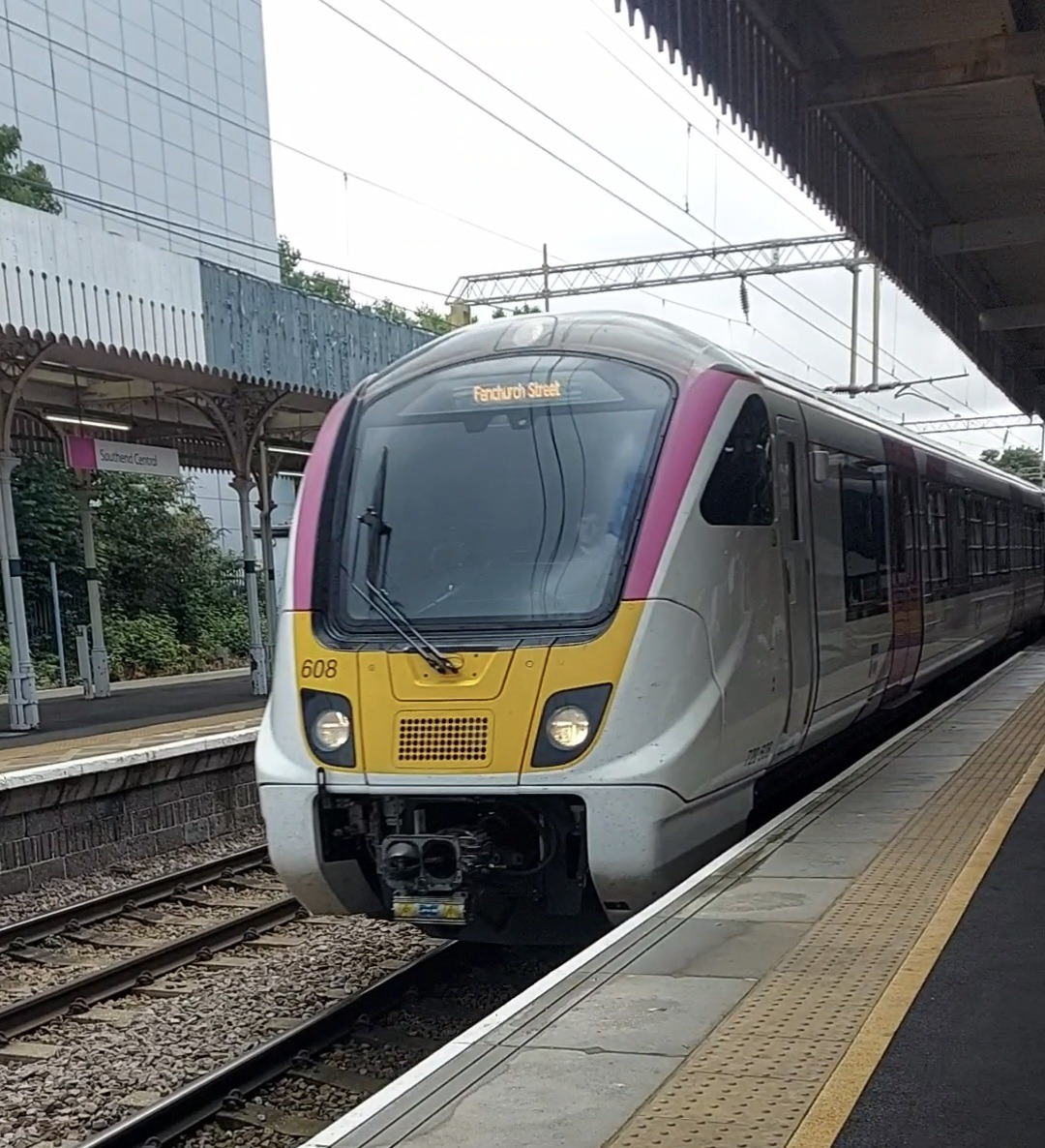
- Class 720 at Southend Central

Overview
- Status: Operational
- Owner: Network Rail
- Locale: Greater London; Essex
- Termini: London Fenchurch Street; Shoeburyness
- Stations: 26

Service
- Type: Commuter rail, heavy rail
- System: National Rail
- Operators: c2c; London Overground
- Depots: East Ham; Shoeburyness
- Rolling stock: Class 357; Class 710; Class 720

History
- Opened: 1854

Technical
- Line length: 39 miles 40 chains (63.6 km) (main line via Basildon)
- Number of tracks: 2
- Track gauge: 1,435 mm (4 ft 8 1/2 in) standard gauge
- Electrification: 25 kV 50 Hz AC OHLE
- Operating speed: 75 mph (121 km/h)
Route map
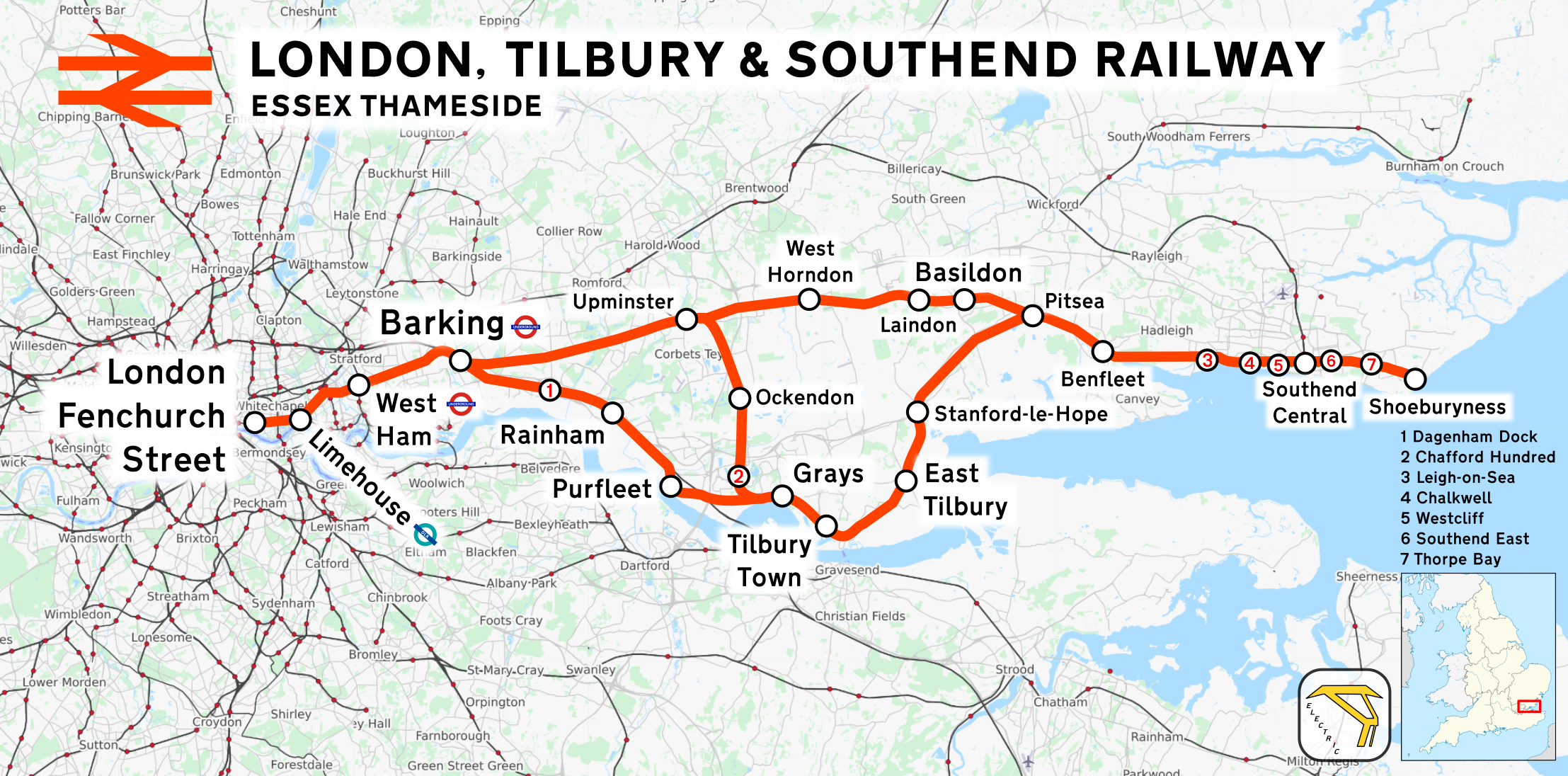
(Click to expand)

The London, Tilbury and Southend line (Note: The route is also known as the Thameside route, Essex Thameside and North Thameside) is a commuter railway line on the British railway system. It connects Fenchurch Street station, in central London, with destinations in east London and Essex, including Barking, Upminster, Basildon, Grays, Tilbury, Southend and Shoeburyness.

Its main users are commuters travelling to and from London, particularly the City of London which is served by Fenchurch Street, and areas in east London including the Docklands financial district via London Underground and Docklands Light Railway connections at Limehouse and West Ham. The line is also heavily used by leisure travellers, as it and its branches serve a number of seaside resorts, shopping areas and countryside destinations. Additionally, the Tilbury Loop portion of the route provides an artery for freight traffic to and from Dagenham Dock and the Tilbury and London Gateway ports. Freight traffic can also travel further using the connection to the Gospel Oak to Barking line and the Great Eastern Main Line at Forest Gate Junction, allowing access to other main routes.

Built by the London, Tilbury and Southend Railway Company – a joint venture between the London and Blackwall Railway and the Eastern Counties Railway companies – the railway was authorised in 1852, with the first section opening in 1854. The route was extended in phases and partnerships were formed with the Midland Railway and District Railway to provide through-services.

The railway serves three main routes. The main line runs from Fenchurch Street to Shoeburyness via Basildon over a distance of 39 miles 40 chains (63.6 km). A loop line between Barking and Pitsea provides an alternative route via Rainham (in the historic county of Essex), Grays and Tilbury . Finally, there is a short branch line connecting the main line at Upminster with the loop line at Grays via Ockendon. The line has a maximum speed limit of 75 mph (121 km/h), although the Class 357 and Class 720 electric trains which run on it are capable of speeds of 100 mph (161 km/h).

The line forms part of Network Rail's strategic route 6. It is classified as a London and South East commuter line. Passenger services form the Essex Thameside rail contract that is operated by c2c, which has been government-owned since July 2025..

== History ==
=== Initial construction (1840–1858) ===
The first part of the line was built by the London and Blackwall Railway whose line from Blackwall opened in 1840 with a terminus at Minories and intermediate stations on the route at Shadwell and Stepney. The line had two independent tracks which were initially worked by cable haulage and it was not until 1848 that steam locomotives were deployed. The line was extended to the current London terminus at Fenchurch Street and operations commenced on 20 July 1841. A short-lived station opened on the route at Cannon Street Road in 1842 but this closed by 1848.

The L&BR built an extension, known as the London and Blackwall Extension Railway, from Stepney station to a junction with the Eastern Counties Railway at Bow but there was a dispute and the junction was never completed. A short lived interchange station at Victoria Park & Bow was built at the junction but saw little traffic which led to a temporary closure of the line in September 1850. In January 1853 a new junction was built at Gas Factory Junction enabling the North London Railway to operate a new service into Fenchurch Street.

The construction of the London, Tilbury and Southend Railway was a joint enterprise between the LBR and ECR and was authorised by the London, Tilbury and Southend Extension Railway Act 1852 (15 & 16 Vict. c. lxxxiv) on 17 June 1852. The first section, built by Peto and Grissell, was opened between Forest Gate Junction on the Eastern Counties Railway main line and Tilbury, via Barking and Grays on 13 April 1854. The junction at Bow was finally completed and as part of the deal and this enabled the Eastern Counties Railway to also start operating into Fenchurch Street. At the same time a third track was opened on the Fenchurch Street approaches and the station expanded to four platforms.

LT&SR services initially ran from Fenchurch Street and Bishopsgate stations over existing lines to Stratford where they were coupled together and then via Forest Gate Junction to Tilbury for ferry connections to Gravesend.

Further extensions opened in late 1854 to Horndon, to Leigh-on-Sea on 1 July 1855 and finally to Southend on 1 March 1856.

In 1858 a more direct route from London to Barking was constructed through Bromley, Plaistow and East Ham, connecting with the London and Blackwall Extension Railway a very short distance north east of Gas Factory Junction, and the service from Bishopsgate was withdrawn.

=== Route development (1875–1912) ===
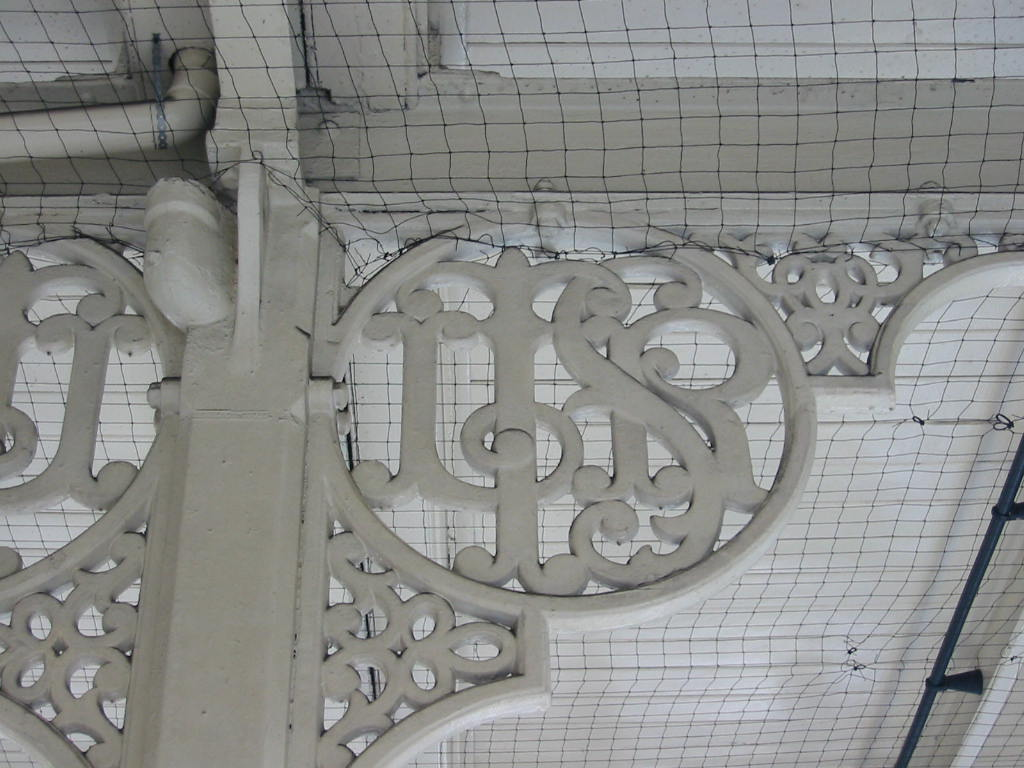
LTSR canopy support at East Ham (no longer served by main line trains)

Under the management of the LT&SR lessees from 1856 to 1875 little additional work was done to the LT&S lines. After some degree of independence was achieved in 1875 the LT&SR started to take steps to becoming an organisation that could stand on its own two feet. One of the first steps was building its own works/engine shed facility at Plaistow followed by ordering its first locomotives. A station at Upton Park was opened in 1877 largely funded by a developer.

By the 1860s the railways in East Anglia were in financial trouble, and most were leased to the ECR; they wished to amalgamate formally, but could not obtain government agreement for this until 1862, when the Great Eastern Railway (GER) was formed by amalgamation.

In 1866 the LBR was taken over by the GER and all the stations between Fenchurch Street and Stepney became GER stations.

On 5 April 1880 the Limehouse Curve opened with a new junction called Salmon Lane Junction, located between Gas Factory Junction and Stepney it provided a link on to the London and Blackwall line, heading towards Blackwall. The GER ran a short-lived Palace Gates to Blackwall service via Stratford but this only lasted a year and there were some Blackwall – Southend excursion trains run in 1890. Primary use of the line was to offer another goods route into the docks.

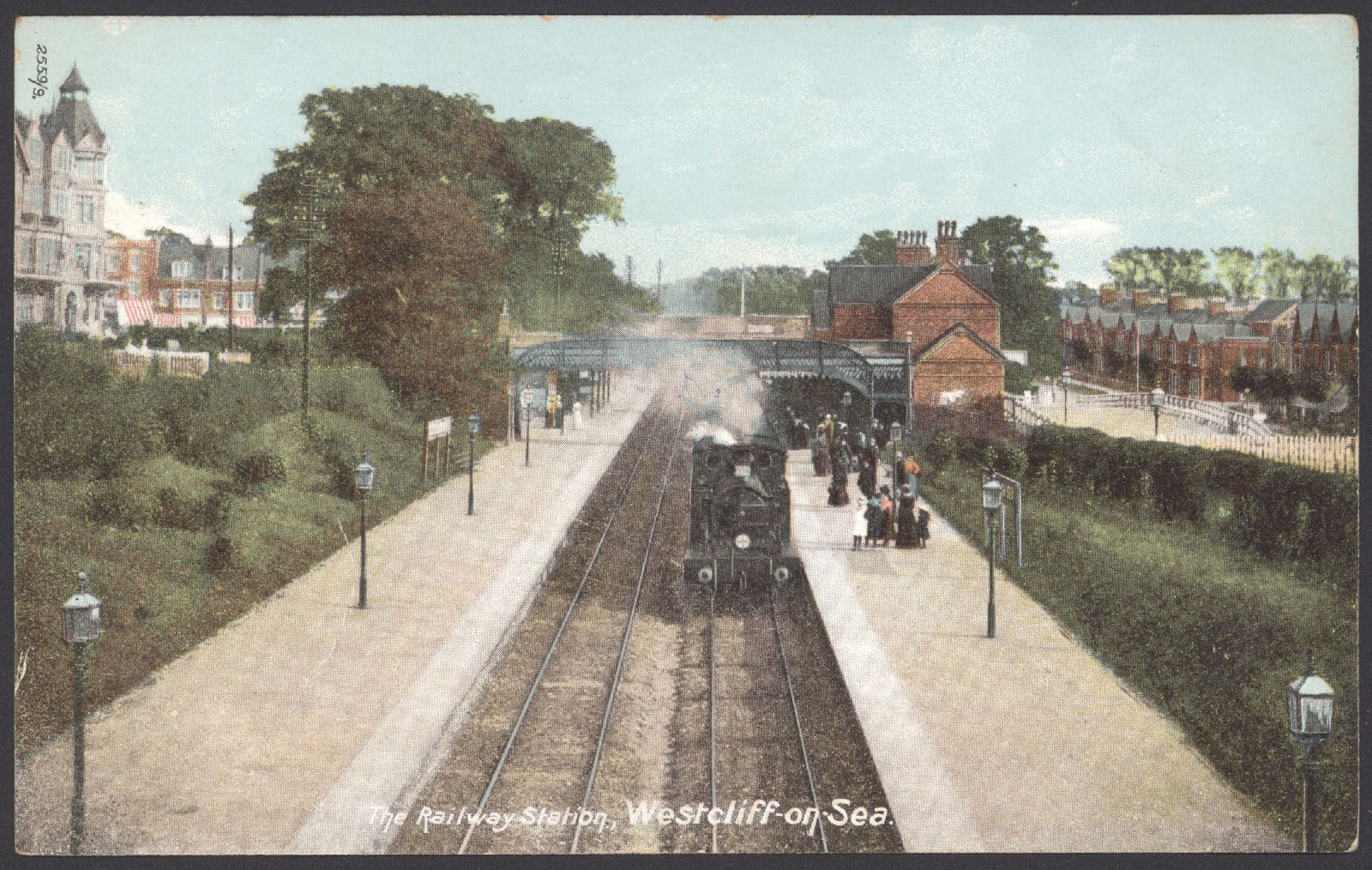
Westcliff-on-Sea railway station about 1895

Under the management of civil engineer Arthur Lewis Stride, the line was extended from Southend to Shoeburyness. There was also a direct line built between Barking and Pitsea, with new stations at Hornchurch and Upminster opening in 1884. An intermediate station at Dagenham opened in 1885 and the line extended east to East Horndon and later the same year to a re-sited Pitsea in 1886. Two years later a new station between East Horndon and Pitsea was opened at Laindon.

A new station was opened in 1886 at Tilbury Town railway station which was built in conjunction with the building of the rail connected docks next door.

A single-track branch was constructed between Grays and Upminster and opened on 1 July 1892 with an intermediate station at Ockendon, The Upminster to Romford section was opened the following year.

The Tottenham and Forest Gate Railway was a joint venture between the Midland Railway and LT&SR and opened on 9 July 1894. This opened the way for through passenger trains from St Pancras to Southend although most trains terminated at Barking.

The approaches to Fenchurch Street were further improved in 1895 with the addition of a fourth track from Stepney to Fenchurch Street.

In 1902, the Whitechapel and Bow Railway was constructed as a joint venture with the District Railway, connecting the London, Tilbury and Southend Railway at Bromley with the District Railway at Whitechapel. The connection allowed through-running of District Railway trains from Central London to provide local services to Upminster from 2 June 1902.

A new station was provided at West Ham in 1901 which was built with four platforms in anticipation of quadrupling to East Ham. The track quadrupling progressed in stages between 1902 and 1905 on the south side of the existing lines which became the Local Lines whilst the newly laid southern lines (known as the Through Lines) were for longer distance services. The Local Lines were electrified allowing District line services to be extended to East Ham.

West of Barking, additional tracks and sidings were provided and the electrified tracks were extended to Barking and that section opened on 1 April 1908.

There were three new stations opened in the years before sale to the Midland Railway which were Dagenham Dock (1908) Thorpe Bay (1910) and for military use only Purfleet Rifle Range Halt in 1911.

=== Great Eastern Railway/Midland Railway (1912–1923) ===
One of, if not the biggest problem, the Midland Railway (MR) faced when it bought the LT&SR was the rising Southend traffic. Additionally traffic was rising on stations between Plaistow and Barking and there were plans to extend more trains out to Upminster. The Midland Railway saw extension of electrification as part of the answer and in 1913 a report by Merz & Mclellan suggested electrification and four tracking between Campbell Road Junction (west of Bromley station) and Stepney station. West of Stepney a new junction at Ratcliff Square would see six lines as far as Cannon Street Road where the line would then drop underground and either run to Aldgate or via two subterranean additional platforms at Fenchurch Street and onto Bank. The lines would have been electrified and east of Bromley the Through Lines would also have been electrified (the Local Lines being electrified in 1905) and electric trains to Southend were envisaged.

In parallel with this the GER was proposing improvements to Fenchurch Street and a plan was agreed that saw:

- The extension of Platform 1 to take longer GER North Woolwich trains
- The extension of Platform 5 and widening of platforms 4 and 5 to allow longer LTSR peak trains
- Re-arrangement of the approach tracks

This agreement was the end of the Merz & Mclellan scheme, although the Midland Railway still wanted to quadruple Bromley to Stepney and this was presented in a parliamentary bill passed as the Midland Railway Act 1914 (4 & 5 Geo. 5. c. cxliii) on 7 August 1914. The bill also covered the quadrupling of Barking to Upminster and a curve at Horndon that would have seen a direct link from Barking to Romford built. Although land between Barking and Upminster was purchased the ongoing strain of World War I saw the collapse of all three schemes.

During the war additional day tripper trains to Southend declined (but did not totally disappear). Military supplies ran to Shoeburyness and Dagenham Dock and Tilbury was the arrival point for many American servicemen between 1917 and 1918. They were moved to camps all over the country by rail. After the end of the war Purfleet was a major demobilisation centre and rail was again used to disperse the former troops throughout the country. Records show that LT&SR locomotives worked as far as Wood Green (Alexandra Palace) on the Great Northern line from London Kings Cross.

The war slowed down the rise in traffic and house building at Southend was paused until the 1920s. The nature of traffic at Fenchurch Street was changing as passenger numbers fell on the GER Blackwall and North Woolwich services. As these services declined and were withdrawn, the LT&SR was allowed to run additional trains in their stead.

The Railways Act 1921 saw the Midland Railway become part of the London Midland & Scottish Railway whilst the GER became part of the London and North Eastern Railway.

=== London & North Eastern Railway and London Midland & Scottish Railway (1923–1947) ===
A new service for workers from Tilbury and East Tilbury to Thames Haven began on 1 January 1923 – the last service had run in 1909. There were four intermediate halts at Mayes Crossing, Curry Marsh, London & Thames Haven Oil Wharves and Thames Haven.

A new halt called Gale Street Halt was opened between Barking and Dagenham station on 28 June 1926 to serve the nearby Becontree Estate although initially the station was not connected by road.

==== The 1929 LMS plan ====
This plan was to see comprehensive investment in new facilities to improve operations as well as additional stations on the LTS Line. Fenchurch Street was not part of the scheme (even though proposals had been made in 1914 and 1924) but a scheme was adopted and agreed with the LNER in 1931/32 as part of the works which would see a total of 19 LMS trains per hour during the peak.

The Fenchurch Street plan saw a comprehensive rebuild and lengthening of the platforms as well as additional approach tracks (which used part of one of the goods depots) as well as the provision of a new signal box and signalling. The platform rebuild and associated infrastructure was completed by the summer of 1935. The new signalling which gave 90 second headways from Stepney to Gasworks Junction was commissioned by April 1935 and consisted of three and four aspect colour light signalling.

This part of the work was carried out by the LNER who were responsible for the line with the LMS paying 2/3 of the cost.

Other works along with the electrification described below, included:

- An up loop line at East Ham for empty carriage stock moves
- A bay platform at Pitsea
- Additional platforms and carriage sidings at Laindon
- Improvements at Benfleet
- A new relocated passenger station at Leigh-on-Sea
- A new station at Chalkwell
- A new station at Southend East
- Additional carriage sidings at Shoeburyness

To support this improvement the LMS built 37 new 3-Cylindered Stanier 2-6-4Ts for the line in 1934 and these were working the line in 1935.

==== Electrification to Upminster ====
Quadrupling and electrifying the line was first considered in the Midland Railway Act 1914 (4 & 5 Geo. 5. c. cxliii) and the LMS presented plans in 1928/1929 to extend the four track section to Upminster. There was no mention of the curve to the Romford line. Upminster station had to be completely rebuilt as a result and additional platforms were added for terminating District Line services. The engine shed at Upminster was demolished and rebuilt at this time.

New stations were opened and existing stations had additional platforms added. The stations were staffed by the LMS and from west to east were:-

1932 District Line extension stations
Name	Opened	Remarks
Upney	12 September 1932	New station – platforms only on Local Lines
Becontree	28 June 1926	Existing station expanded from 2 to 4 platforms – name changed from Gale Street Halt Halt on 18 July 1932
Heathway	12 September 1932	New station – platforms only on Local Lines. Renamed Dagenham Heathway on 1 May 1949
Dagenham	1 May 1885	Existing station expanded from 2 to 4 platforms – a siding to run back trains was provided east of the station. Renamed Dagenham East on 1 May 1949
Elm Park	13 May 1935	New station – platforms only on Local Lines
Hornchurch	1 May 1885	Existing station expanded from 2 to 4 platforms
Upminster Bridge	17 December 1934	New station – platforms only on Local Lines
Upminster	1 May 1885	Existing station that had to be considerably rebuilt. Two platforms added to existing three and six carriage sidings added at east end of the station.

==== The Metropolitan Line extends east ====
The London Passenger Transport Board (LPTB) was founded in 1932 and bought the management of the different underground lines under one roof. Discussions between the LMS and LPTB resulted in a decision to route Metropolitan Hammersmith & City trains away from the East London line and to terminate at Barking instead. The provision of a flyover to remove goods trains from crossing the layout was not proceeded with but other changes to improve the flexibility at Barking were made. To release turnaround capacity at Barking, a bay platform and stabling siding were put in at Dagenham and stabling increased at Upminster. The new Metropolitan line service began on 4 May 1936 and an additional eight hourly services worked in with 27 District Line services.

==== World War II ====
The impact of World War II on the LTS line was far greater than the First World War as a result of the London Blitz of 1940/1941 and the later deployment of the V1 and V2 flying bombs. The first big event was the evacuation of children from the area and a number of trains were run in late 1939 although many children returned when the extensive aerial bombardment did not materialise. During 1940 a lot of people moved out of towns such as Southend as it was one of the areas expected, by the population at least, to be under threat of invasion. The LMS had to deal with a mass evacuation of children and on 2 June 1940 with 12 trains running to destinations in Nottinghamshire and Derbyshire.

The timetable was reduced with through District services being cut and other services being cut back but these were minor compared to other areas in the UK. The service was slowed down as the Stanier 3-cylinder 2-6-4Ts were transferred away, and haulage was put back in the hands of the LT&SR and LMS 4-4-2Ts.

The first serious incident was recorded on 18 August 1940 when Shoeburyness station and signal box were bombed and a signalman, Charles Walter Speller, was killed on 18 August 1940. The London Blitz lasted until Saturday 10 May/Sunday 11 May 1941 and Kay records 26 serious incidents between those two dates. There were a few minor raids between 1942 and early 1944. Incidents elsewhere in London also affected the LTS Line, For example, the Metropolitan line services were suspended 9 December 1940 – March 1941 due to air raid damage at Kings Cross.

Some service cuts were made during the blitz including the end of the LNER Fenchurch Street to North Woolwich services (via Bromley and Abbey Mills Junction). 1941 saw the closure of Burdett Road (bomb damage), Shadwell and Leman Street. The latter briefly acted as the London terminal of the line when Fenchurch Street had been put out of service due to bomb damage in September 1940.

The V weapons bombardment first affected the LTS line on 30 June 1944 when a V1 hit the LMS single line at Romford station. A further ten incidents followed with the last on 17 March 1945 when a V2 exploded at Ripple Lane.

=== British Railways (1948–1994) ===
Following nationalisation on 1 January 1948 the LTS line was split so that Fenchurch Street to Gas Factory Junction became part of the Eastern Region whilst the rest of the LTS Line became part of the London Midland Region. This arrangement did not last long and on 20 February 1949 the whole of the LTS line was bought under Eastern Region control. November 1949 saw platforms 1 and 2 at Fenchurch Street electrified through to Bow Junction on the Great Eastern Main Line on the 1500v DC system. No regular electric services worked this line and it was primarily for diversion and emergency usage although regular empty trains ran to ensure the system worked. These were formed of AM6 electric multiple units.

During the brief period of London Midland Region control the little used Purfleet Rifle Range Halt was closed on 31 May 1948. During 1949 East Horndon was renamed West Horndon (where it actually was), Heathway was renamed Dagenham Heathway and Dagenham renamed Dagenham East.

==== The 1953 floods ====
The catastrophic North Sea flood of 1953 flooded parts of the LTS line on 1 February 1953. The affected areas on the LTS line were:

- Purfleet to West Thurrock Junction
- Tilbury Riverside station
- Tilbury to Low Street
- Thames Haven branch
- Benfleet to Leigh on sea.

The last section cut the Southend end of the line off from the London end and a significant number of locomotives and carriages were effectively marooned. Additional services were put in from Southend Victoria to Shenfield where passengers could then change to additional express EMU worked services to Fenchurch Street. This later changed to direct services which saw former GE and LNE tender engines visit Fenchurch Street, normally the home of tank engines.

The damage was severe and it was not until 19 February that normal Southend services resumed.

The flooding around Purfleet saw Tilbury traffic diverted via Ockenden with normal services being restored on the same date.

The line was further flooded in 1958 but not to the extent of 1953.

==== Coronation and Southend centenary celebrations ====
The 1953 Coronation of Elizabeth II was a major event that took place on 2 June 1953. The stations at Fenchurch Street and Tilbury Riverside were both decorated to celebrate the event.

To celebrate 100 years of the arrival of the railway at Southend, 79 Class 4-4-2T Thundersley which had been restored to LT&SR grey livery, worked two special trains and an exhibition of locomotives was held at Southend station between 1 March and 3 March 1956. The locomotives included LNER Class A4 4468 Mallard, British Railways class EM2 no 27002, and new diesel multiple unit and electric multiple units that were entering service on the LTS line.

==== Separation of the District line ====
The need for more District Line services led to discussions with the London Transport Executive (LTE), which had replaced the LPTB on 1 January 1948. The main problems were goods train crossing moves at Bromley, Little Ilford and Barking East prevented more trains operating on the District Line. To ensure total separation the Grays to Romford service would need to be split into distinct halves at Upminster, although a flyover was briefly considered. This meant the Romford line disconnected from the rest of the LTS line. The railway executive division of the British Transport Commission were initially opposed to the idea but on 17 July 1952 the Eastern Region was instructed to engage with the LTE on this issue.

The LTE took over the electric supply of the Local Lines whilst main line electrification which would have a different supply was being progressed. The electrification plan had already predicted the end of the former goods exchange sidings at Plaistow and West Ham (which would move to the new Ripple Lane marshalling yard) and the closure of Plaistow Engine Shed (on the northern side of the Local Lines). This meant the closure of the Bow to Bromley curve was feasible with traffic being routed via Forest Gate Junction of the T&FG line and this happened on 11 September 1959.

Various crossovers between the two sets of lines and sidings were removed during this project and the canopies were removed from the main line platforms. A summary of the changes is shown below but does not include other changes such as goods yard closures which happened in the 1960s. Also during this time London Transport (LT) re-signalled the Local Lines between 1958 and 1960 with a new LT signal box at Upminster and a facility shared with BR at Barking. BR re-signalled the main lines in 1960 to 1961 which saw the abolition of many of the old signal boxes. It was shortly after this period that the Limehouse Curve was closed on 5 November 1962.

- Campbell Road Junction – Signal Box abolished
- Bromley – NLR Junction removed 27 September 1959 – Signal Box stopped controlling local lines. The signal box was later abolished in 1961. Goods Yard closed 1964.
- Abbey Mills Junction – reduced to sidings and then closed 7 August 1960
- West Ham – West Ham sidings lifted 1958, Connections removed and control of Local Lines ceased 3 October 1959. Signal box abolished 1961. The through island platform was reduced in 1963.
- Plaistow – Up Sidings Box abolished 13 September 1959 after which sidings used to stable carriage trains between peaks. Signal box abolished 1961. The up side (engine shed and carriage sidings) remained in service until May 1962 and were used for storage of withdrawn vehicles awaiting scrap. Connections removed 1963.
- Upton Park – Crossover removed January 1960 and signal box ceased to control Local Lines a month later. Signal box closed May 1961 and remaining goods yard which lasted until 1984 was accessed by ground frame.
- Barking – see below
- Becontree – Signal Box abolished 14 July 1961
- Dagenham East – All crossovers out of use 11 November 1959 – goods yard thought to be closed at same time. Signal Box closed 17 April 1961 – remaining sidings serving May and Bakers served by ground frame
- Hornchurch – crossovers removed c 1959. Signal Box stopped controlling local lines. The signal box was later abolished on 17 April 1961. Remaining sidings serving goods yard served by ground frame
- Upminster – New platform 6 for Romford service opened 19 May 1957. Layout reworked with longer platforms for main line services and District Line depot provided at eastern end of station. Local line control was taken over by the underground on 30 November 1958 and Upminster West box was abolished with re-signalling on 6 February 1961. The goods yard closed around 1964 with all connections removed the following year. The Upminster to Romford line was separated from the rest of the LTS Line in 1968 and after that date rolling stock was supplied via the connection to the GEML at Romford and used the dedicated Platform 6 at Upminster.

The rebuild at Barking was significant. In addition to re-signalling and electrification changes and the desire to separate the District Line services from British Railways the decision was made to provide a flyover that meant freight trains no longer had to cross the layout. In order to improve the passenger interchange between District Line and British rail (and vice versa) dive-under lines were provided at the west end of Barking and a flyover at the east end.

East Ham depot was also being built on the site of Little Ilford sidings so this meant the closure of Barking goods yard, Little Ilford Sidings and the displacement of District Line stabling to the new depot at Upminster. Some LT stabling sidings were also provided at the west end of Barking.

The line that linked East Ham to Woodgrange Park was also closed as part of this work on 30 November 1958 although in truth it saw little use in its final years.

==== Electrification ====
The London Plan Working Party Report of 1949, envisaged as its Route G the LTSR electrified and diverted away from Fenchurch Street to Bank and onward through the Waterloo & City line tunnels to Waterloo and its suburban lines. Of course, the Waterloo & City tunnels would have had to be bored out to main-line size for this proposal to succeed.

Electrification went ahead, however, from 1961 to 1962 under British Railways, but to Fenchurch Street, not to Bank and Waterloo. The direct passenger services from Bromley, Plaistow, Upton Park, East Ham, Becontree, Dagenham and Hornchurch to Fenchurch Street were withdrawn although the stations retained District Line platforms. With the completion of electrification the remaining through steam services from St Pancras to LTS line destinations were removed.

The line was also re-signalled between 1958 and 1961, starting in the Barking area in April 1958 and completed in August 1961 with the section between Purfleet and West Thurrock Junction. Semaphore signals were replaced with 3- and 4-aspect searchlight signals.

The following stations were altered (in addition to the changes described in the section above):

- West Horndon – Up sidings removed, down sidings relocated. Platforms extended
- Laindon – middle track converted into reversing platform. Platforms extended
- Pitsea – reversing siding lengthened – new footbridge
- Leigh-on-Sea – additional up platform added. Station partially rebuilt. Middle platform now reversibly worked.
- Benfleet – platforms extended
- Westcliff-on-sea – station buildings rebuilt
- Southend Central – changes to track layout/platform extensions

The first electric train formed of AM2 electric multiple unit stock on the line entered service on 6 November 1961.

The last steam train operated out of Fenchurch Street was the 6:10pm to Thorpe Bay on 15 June 1962 which was worked by LMS 3-Cylindered Stanier 2-6-4T number 42501. Steam hauled boat trains and freight trains continued throughout 1962 and 1963 with what is thought to be a final working seen in 1964 when a BR Class 5 4-6-0 led three other locomotives to a scrapyard at Grays. June 1962 also saw the introduction of an accelerated all electric timetable with Southend being reached in 48 minutes during the evening peak.

The Thames Haven branch closed to passengers on 9 June 1958. During the 1960s many of the local goods yards closed but only one station – Low Street, which closed on 5 May 1967. Westcliff-on-Sea station was renamed Westcliff on 20 February 1969.

==== The 1970s ====
In 1972, the British Railways Board (BRB) proposed to construct a one-mile freight-only spur line from the railway at Bowers Gifford between Pitsea and Benfleet to East Haven creek and thence to the proposed oil refineries on Canvey Island, to allow petroleum products to be exported from the refineries. Once the layout of the proposed refineries had been established, in early 1974 the BRB sought powers to extend the spur line a further mile from the creek to the site of the refineries through the British Railways Bill 1974. The bill was subject to considerable opposition in parliament, furthermore a public inquiry proposed to revoke planning permission for one of the refineries. The proposal was abandoned and the BRB removed the spur line proposal from the 1974 bill.

On 25 November 1974 a station was opened to serve the new town of Basildon.

==== The 1980s ====
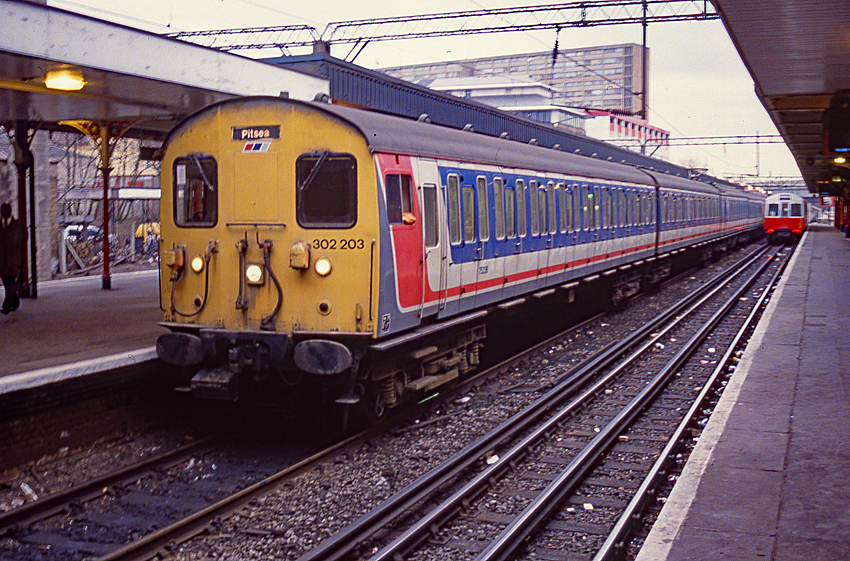
BR Class 302 EMU at Barking in NSE days

Upon sectorisation in 1982, the London & South Eastern sector took over responsibility for passenger services in the south-east of England, working with the existing BR business units of Regions and Functions to deliver the overall service. Day-to-day operation, staffing and timetabling continued to be delivered by the Regions – and the sector came into existence with barely thirty staff based at Waterloo.

On 10 June 1986, L&SE was relaunched as Network SouthEast, along with a new red, white and blue livery. The relaunch was intended to be more than a superficial rebranding and was underpinned by considerable investment in the presentation of stations and trains, as well as efforts to improve service standards. Passenger numbers grew, as commuters travelled to the City of London during the Big Bang of the financial markets in the late 1980s. Despite the efforts of Network SouthEast, the performance of and environment on the line became very poor in the 1990s and it was known as the Misery Line.

In 1991 the Docklands Light Railway opened from a new station at Tower Gateway (located on the former Minories station site) to Canary Wharf and Island Gardens. The line was built on a new viaduct adjacent to the LTS line and an interchange was available with LTS services at Limehouse station after which it used the old London & Blackwall Railway route (closed to passengers in 1926).

=== The privatisation era (1994–2025) ===
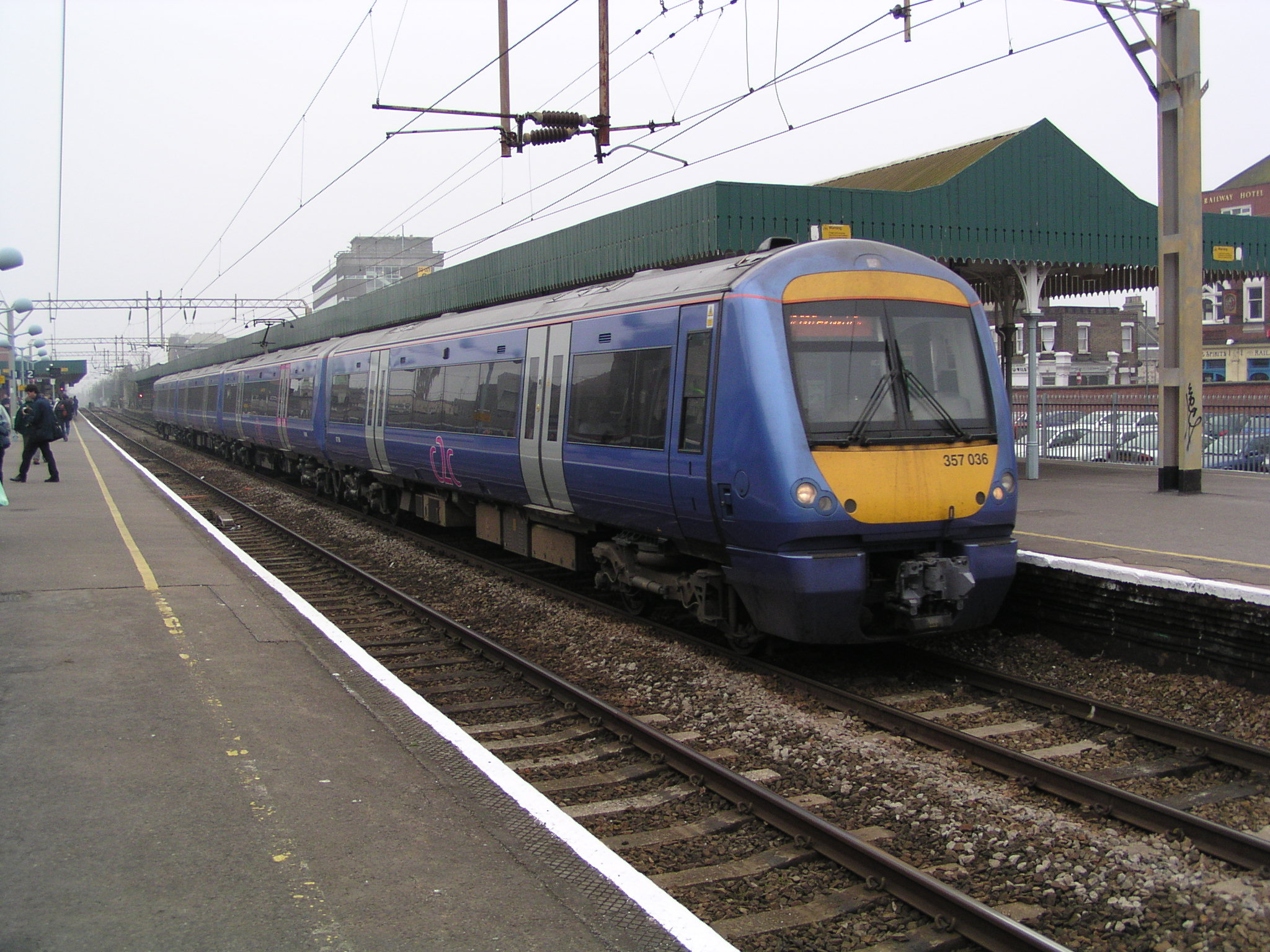
A c2c Electrostar train on the LTSR

During the early 1990s proposals were put forward to convert the whole route into a guided busway, however these plans were quickly dismissed when British Rail announced a complete re-signalling of the line.

On 30 November 1992, Tilbury Riverside station was closed. For many years prior to closure, the station was served only by certain trains on the local service from Upminster via Grays, because the nearby Dartford Crossing and increased car ownership had caused a decline in its importance as a passenger ferry terminal. There was some opposition to closure, but British Rail cited financial reasons for the closure with the annual cost of running the service at £180,000 against income of £11,000.

In 1995 a station was built at Chafford Hundred to serve the new community there as well as Lakeside Shopping Centre. Main line platforms were re-established and opened at West Ham in 1999, to provide interchange with the extended Jubilee line and North London line. (Note: This section of the North London Line closed on 10 December 2006 and a new branch of the Docklands Light Railway utilises the alignment to an eastward branch along the approximate route of the former Eastern Counties and Thames Junction Railway on the southern side of the Royal Docks complex opened from Canning Town to King George V via London City Airport.)

In the late 1990s, the line was comprehensively upgraded with new signals, refurbished track and new Class 357 Electrostar trains, operated by c2c. Owing to the growth in commuting into London – to the City and Canary Wharf – and the rise in population living in London, passenger numbers on the route have increased substantially, rising by 34% between 2011 and 2019. Freight along the line has also increased, thanks to the Port of Tilbury and the London Gateway port (which opened in 2013), as well as the connection to High Speed 1 for European freight trains.

On 20 July 2025, the operator c2c was returned to public ownership by the Labour Government.

== Operations ==
=== Timetables ===
Commentary on LT&SR timetables prior to 1912 can be found in the London, Tilbury and Southend Railway entry.

==== Early years ====
On the London and Blackwall cable railway the trains worked every 15 minutes and the journey time was 13 minutes. The service was operated between 08:45 and 09:45pm. There were regular connecting ferries to Gravesend and Woolwich and it was possible to book through tickets. This pattern was still in place in 1850 (by now the L&BR was a more conventional railway) and there was a through service to Bow on the new extension railway every half hour.

At Fenchurch Street in 1854 there were now four companies operating trains – the LT&SR, The North London Railway (NLR). The Eastern Counties Railway (ECR) and the L&BR. The LT&SR services were at this time routed via Stratford and Forest Gate Junction thence Barking and onto Tilbury. ECR services were routed to Loughton and NLR services to Chalk Farm.

==== Services to and from Stratford and North Woolwich ====
The first Eastern Counties Railway services started operating in 1854 when the main Bishopsgate – Norwich line was connected to the London & Blackwall Extension Railway at Bow Junction. This also enabled LTSR services to access Fenchurch Street which they continued to do until their direct route from Barking to Gas Factory Junction to Barking was opened in 1858.

After that the Bow Junction to Gas Factory Junction line was operated by the ECR and from 1862 the GER. There was one intermediate station at Bow Road which opened in 1876 and was re-sited to provide an interchange with the adjacent NLR station in 1892.

Services varied over the years and included:

- Loughton via Stratford
- North Woolwich via Stratford Market
- North Woolwich via Bromley and Abbey Mills curve.
- Gallions
- Ilford/Gidea Park via Stratford

Regular services from Fenchurch Street to Stratford were withdrawn on 7 November 1949 as a result of the Central Line service commencing operation to Stratford in 1946 and in various stages out to Loughton in 1949. This left the former LTS main line services as the only trains running into Fenchurch Street.

==== Midland Railway ====
The Midland Railway (MR) bought the LT&SR in 1912 and operated their services until 1923. On takeover the daily number of passengers carried by the MR doubled although the effect on revenue because of the shorter distances was less. MR services survived the war relatively unscathed although there was a deceleration in services that was not properly reversed until 1935. A summary of the regular main line services over the line in January 1918 saw:

- 22 services to Southend/Shoeburyness via Laindon
- 23 services to Tilbury, 13 of which continued to Pitsea, Southend or Shoeburyness
- 3 services to inner locations terminating at Plaistow, Barking and West Ham
- 4 services from St Pancras to Southend
- 2 services from Ealing to Southend

There was portion working for two services but these disappeared two years later.

==== July 1922 peak summary ====
In July 1922 Fenchurch Street was served by trains operated by the Great Eastern Railway (GER) and the Midland Railway (MR). Between 5 p.m. and 6 p.m. there were 14 departures as follows:

July 1922 departures from Fenchurch Street 5:00–6:00 p.m.
Destination	Company	No. of services	Notes
Shoeburyness via Laindon	MR	4	
Shoeburyness via Tilbury	MR	2	
Blackwall	GER	4	This service was in decline by this date
Loughton via Stratford	GER	2	
North Woolwich via Bow Road and Stratford Market	GER	2	

Direct trains to Gallions usually routed via Bromley operated in other hours outside the peak. During the peak hours passengers for Gallions changed at Custom House for a shuttle service.

==== North London Railway ====
In 1852 Gas Factory Junction was originally opened to provide a link from the North London Railway into Fenchurch Street which acted as their city terminus until Broad Street was opened in 1866. The GER took over operation of the NLR shuttle between Fenchurch Street and Bow (NLR) in 1869, which it operated until April 1892 when the second Bow Road railway station opened along with a passenger foot connection to the NLR station.

In addition to this the NLR ran a service to Plaistow via the curve linking Bow to Bromley which linked into the LTSR at the west end of Bromley station. This was initially a through train but later became a shuttle from their station at Bow. The service was withdrawn as a wartime economy measure in 1916.

==== London Midland and Scottish Railway LTS line services ====
The LMS operated services between 1923 and 1947.

By 1924 there was no capacity to add any further services and bar minor changes the timetables remained more or less unchanged until the 1934/5 changes at Fenchurch Street (see above) resulted in capacity for more services.

However, in 1926 the London and Blackwall line from Stepney towards Blackwall closed. The new timetable started in April 1935 with many improvements to peak hour services but little change to the off peak.

In the morning peak there were now six additional up services from Southend/Shoeburyness and three additional services from the Tilbury Line with a total of 28 trains. In the evening peak the same number of additional services and 22 services. There were an additional seven LNER services per hour.

===== Broad Street services =====
Up morning and down evening peak hour services operated from 1 January 1923. This service was planned by the MR and London North Western Railway in late 1922 but it was operated by the LMS into which those two companies were merged as part of the 1921 Railways Act. The service consisted of an up morning and down evening peak with the carriages being stabled at Devons Road. The locomotive probably returned to Plaistow engine shed.

By 1927 there were three trains per day from the LTS line to Broad Street with one starting at Thorpe Bay, one at Southend and one at Tilbury.

Initially non stop, stops were added to all services at Dalston Junction and the Thorpe Bay service also had Bow and Hackney stops.

Significant improvements to the peak hour LTS line timetable in February 1935 saw the service discontinued from April 1935.

==== District Line services ====
District Line services starting operating over LTS lines when the Whitechapel and Bow Railway connected to the LTS line at Campbell Road Junction west of Bow. Most services terminated at East Ham but a number of peak services continued to/started from Upminster. These additional services put strain on the two track section to Barking and work started soon after on the quadrupling out to East Ham which opened in 1905 and Barking after substantial remodelling in 1908. As well as quadrupling the lines were electrified out to Barking. With the District Line services stopping at the minor stations the LT&SR removed stops between Barking and Bromley to speed up longer distance trains.

The 1908 District timetable had 163 District Line trains working to East Ham (50) and Barking (112).From 1912 the down side bay at Plaistow was lengthened and electrified allowing District Line trains to terminate there.

From 1910 longer distance services operated from Ealing Broadway via Victoria, Charing Cross and Whitechapel to Southend with some going through to Shoeburyness. The service had limited stops on the District Line and in the July 1912 the 08:00 departure from Ealing Broadway took two hours to reach Shoeburyness. Up to 1911 District Line electric locomotives worked as far as Little Ilford sidings (between East Ham and Barking) where an LT&SR steam locomotive took over. Once Barking platforms 2 and 3 were electrified in 1911 the change took place there. In the up direction the 05:05 and 07:27 departures from Southend allowed for an arrival in Central London before 09:00.

The June 1912 timetable had four weekday (and Saturday) return trips each way and six on Sundays. World War 1 saw the service reduced to two per day and by 1921 this was reduced to one. However the service built up and by 1927 there were six trains per day – three in the morning starting at Upminster and Thorpe Bay and three in the evening, two from Southend and one from Thorpe Bay ( the stock came from Shoeburyness but did not serve the station there). The first eastbound train from Ealing did not depart until 09:35 and was formed from the stock of the early morning 7:02 a.m. departure from Thorpe Bay. Of note were two late evening Ealing Broadway to Southend departures that acted as theatre trains for London West End traffic.

In June 1925 the LMS started re-signalling the local lines between Bromley and Barking to enable more District Line services to run. LMS trains did use the Local Lines but only late at night. The re-signalling was completed by June 1929. The number of District Line trains now operating onto the LTS line was 243 per day.

By 1935 the Southend service had been reduced to four per day and in the May 1939 timetable there was a single service each way. The start of World War 2 saw the introduction of an emergency timetable on the line and the end of through District Line services on 11 September 1939.

==== St Pancras services ====
In connection with the opening of the Tottenham and Forest Gate Railway a daily service started operating between Southend and St Pancras.

This increased in later years and in the August 1913 timetable there were four through trains from St Pancras to Southend as well as a number of summer specials emanating at intermediate stations along the route. However the route was not particularly popular with passengers on the LTS line because most of the trains called at all stations.

Originally operated by the Midland Railway, the LTSR took over and it then returned to Midland operation in 1912. In July 1914 a through coach to Derby was part of the 10:45 a.m. Southend to St Pancras service where it was attached to the 12:15 Liverpool service. Due to the First World War the service was discontinued.

The core service of four trains per day continued until 1939 when the second world war saw the service reduced to two services per day. Four trains were restored post war but the fifties saw further reductions in the service with some services terminating at Kentish Town. By 1958 the service was reduced to one regular weekday and three Saturday services and the following year it was reduced to one Saturday service. The last year a regular booked service ran was June 1962 which ran to/from Kentish Town. After that T&FG passengers had to change at Barking, although a booked through Sunday service ran from Luton non stop via the T&FG through to Southend in 1963.

==== 1962 all electric timetable ====
Following re-signalling, the separation of the District Line and electrification the first electric timetable commenced operation in June 1962. The off-peak timetable consisted of six trains per hour on a repeating pattern timetable. The departures were:

- xx:00 Fenchurch Street to Southend & Shoeburyness fast service via Laindon – first stop Upminster for connection to Grays via Ockenden then Leigh-on -sea then all stations
- xx:05 Fenchurch Street to Southend & Shoeburyness all stations via Tilbury Riverside (reverse)
- xx:10 Fenchurch Street to Southend & Shoeburyness all stations via Laindon
- xx:30 Fenchurch Street to Southend & Shoeburyness fast service via Laindon – first stop Barking then Benfleet and all stations
- xx:35 Fenchurch Street to Southend & Shoeburyness all stations via Tilbury Riverside (reverse) except Stepney East
- xx:40 Fenchurch Street to Southend & Shoeburyness all stations via Laindon

The morning peak saw 24 arrivals between 7:45 a.m. and 9:15 a.m. with a fast journey time from Southend of 48 minutes. Of note were two trains using the Tilbury avoiding line and offering Stanford-le-hope passengers radically improved journey times.

In the evening peak between 4:30 pm and 6:30 pm there were 29 departures, with the fastest journey time to Southend being the 6:00 pm, marketed as "the Spiv" taking 44 minutes with stops at Leigh-on-Sea, Benfleet and Westcliff.

==== May 2020 ====
This section has been sourced from the online working timetable on the Network Rail site. It is likely that after a period it will be deleted from the site as it becomes out of date.

The published May 2020 working timetable had nine services in the off peak hour from Fenchurch Street and all trains called at Limehouse (formerly Stepney) and West Ham. Developments of the London Docklands into a major commercial centre and connections to the Docklands Light Railway and Jubilee Line sees significant interchange traffic both peak and off-peak. Ockenden and the new station at Chafford Hundred also enjoyed direct services with a through train that was routed through to Southend.

The morning peak has since seen an increase in services primarily due to the increase in traffic to the City of London and revitalised London Docklands area. Between 07:45 and 09:15 30 services arrived into Fenchurch Street – a further six from 1962. The fastest up service from Southend was the 07:11 departure arriving into Fenchurch Street at 08:00 (49 minutes) with stops at Westcliff and Chalkwell, then fast to West Ham, Limehouse and Fenchurch Street.

In the evening peak there are 37 departures from Fenchurch Street station but times to Southend have slipped with the fastest being around the 52 minute mark. This is due to the operator needing to call at Limehouse and West Ham and more often at intermediate locations that have seen population growth since 1962. During the period of this and the December 2020 timetables some trains would not have run due to the COVID-19 pandemic.

==== Holiday and special traffic ====
Southend holiday traffic had existed before the arrival of the railway in 1856 with steamers calling at the pier. The LT&SR captured some of this traffic and increased the numbers visiting Southend and that traffic was continued after 1912 by the Midland Railway. World War 1 saw the traffic fall off but not disappear and, after the war holiday traffic returned.

Similarly World War 2 saw holiday traffic drop off during hostilities and then return after hostilities ceased. Changing attitudes to holidays and widespread car ownership in the 1960s saw numbers start to decline.

Boat trains served Tilbury right up until the 1960s and ran from St Pancras, Liverpool Street and Fenchurch Street.

=== Goods services ===
==== Goods Traffic 1912 ====
Prior to 1923 goods traffic would be moved from one railway to an exchange yard or sidings on its border where the locomotive would be detached and replaced by a locomotive of another company to take the train forward.

Before 1912 this activity happened at:

- Barking Goods Yard – Great Eastern to LT&SR
- Woodgrange Park – Midland Railway to LT&SR 1894–1909
- Little Ilford – Midland Railway to LT&SR 1909–1912 after which Midland trains would have worked through to destinations on the LT&SR (possibly with a pilot driver)
- Plaistow/West Ham – North London Railway/London North Western Railway

It was not unknown for "foreign" locomotives to work through to destination but this was the exception rather than the rule.

Goods traffic continued to the multitude of goods depots on the approach to Fenchurch Street (see below), with the Midland now operating the fast goods trains between Commercial Road and Tilbury Docks. Internal LTS line goods trains were worked from Plaistow and Little Ilford.

Following the industrialisation of Thames-side goods traffic increased and Dagenham Dock became a railhead for Fords and Samuel Williams traffic. Other industries around Grays and Purfleet were also generating goods traffic.

===== The approaches to Fenchurch Street =====
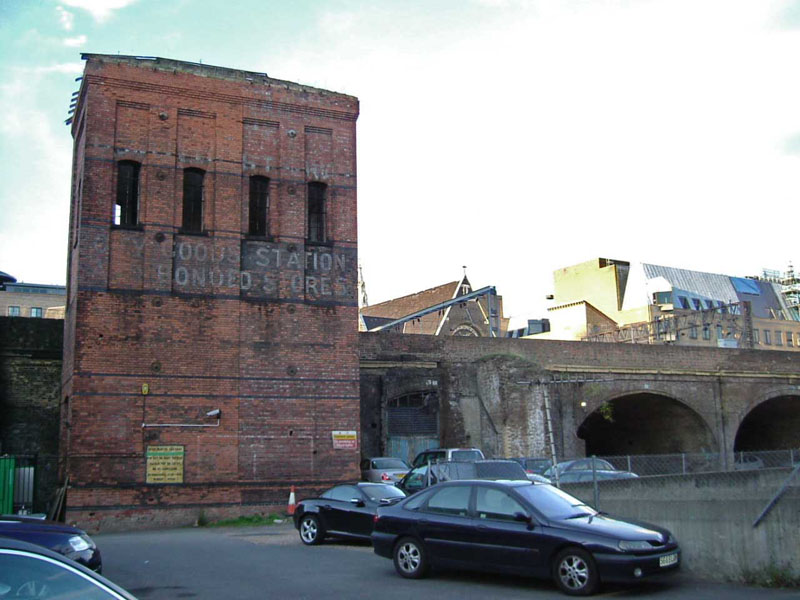
An abandoned hydraulic accumulator tower to the east of Fenchurch Street station, now demolished

A number of goods depots were established near Fenchurch Street owing to the station's proximity to the City of London. This table lists the depots connected to the line between the station and Christian Street Junction just east of Leman Street:

Name	Company	Opening	Closed	Notes
Cable Street	Great Eastern Railway	1870s	??	Coal depot – leased by Charringtons
City Goods	Midland Railway	1 October 1862	1 July 1949	Closed after nationalisation (duplication of facilities). A hydraulic accumulator tower lasted until 2015, when it was demolished
Commercial Road	LTSR	17 April 1886	3 July 1967	
East Smithfield	Great Eastern Railway	17 June 1864	1 September 1966	Short quarter-mile branch that led to the Thames riverside. Marked as London Docks on Railway Clearing House diagram above.
Goodmans Yard	L&BR	1 February 1861	1 April 1951	Built later for ECR and LTSR traffic. Badly damaged during London Blitz.
Haydon Square	London North Western Railway	12 March 1853	2 July 1962	A short fragment of the viaduct serving the depot can be seen today (2015).
Mint Street	L&BR; then leased to the Great Northern Railway from 1861	1 August 1858	1 April 1951	Contained part of the original Minories station building. Known as Royal Mint Street c. 1870. Badly damaged by bombs on 29 December 1940. Closed after nationalisation (duplication of facilities).

===== Thameside rail served industries =====
The LTS Line between Ripple Lane and Tilbury had numerous sidings serving various industries, some of which had their own internal railways or shunting locomotives. The table below shows a selection of these:

North Thameside rail-served freight industries
Location	Customer	Traffic	Dates	Notes
Dagenham Dock	Fords	Cars/car parts	1931–20??	Internal railway system employing ex-BR shunters in the 1970s/1980s
	Samuel Woods	Coal	1889–1970s	Rail network reached jetties on the Thames.
Purfleet Rifle Range Siding	MOD	Military supplies	1911–??	
Purfleet	St Louis Park Paper Mill Co	Coal?	????	Coal to power mill. Later known as Thames Board Mills,
	Anglo American Oil Company	Kerosene/oil	1888–????	Esso from 1951
	Purfleet Wharf & Saw Mills	Timber	1902–1992	Became Purfleet Deep Wharf & Storage Company in 1941 – large internal railway network
	Foster Yeoman	Aggregates	1984	Still in service
West Thurrock Sidings	Tunnel Portland Cement Co	Cement	1915–1970	Earlier sand and ballast extracted here for building Tilbury Docks
	Thames Matex	Oil	1965–1993	
Grays	Seabrookes	Brewery	1901–1925	Brewery closed and site taken over by Cooperative Laundry and Coal Yard
Tilbury Town	Port of Tilbury	Import/exported goods	1886–1970	Internal rail system – containers still generate rail traffic here

==== Freight Changes ====
Up until the 1940s goods trains on the LTS lines were mostly mixed trains consisting of various wagon types carrying different commodities. During the Second World War, as a result of the risk to coastal shipping from German naval action, block coal trains started running to the LTS line to feed the industrial centres there. Some of this traffic continued after the war but the plans for electrification and separation of the District Line were all going to see the removal of some facilities. There was enough goods still being carried on the railways for a new approach.

In the 1949/1950 a plan was drawn up to develop a marshalling yard at Ripple Lane between Barking and Dagenham Dock, itself a significant railhead for Fords car factory. The LMS already had built a yard on this site in 1937 because Plaistow was at capacity and to serve some local industries. The down side had eight sidings and a run round loop whilst the up sidings had seven sidings and a run round loop. The main line at this stage ran through the site. The new marshalling yard was approved by the British Transport Commission act of 1951. The first signs of the new yard were a facility called the Railhead Depot which was opened in 1957. This allowed Barking goods yard to be closed prior to the extensive re-modelling taking pace at that location.

Around the same time the main lines were diverted around the edge of the new site and by 30 May 1958 the yard was ready for business. A depot for electric locomotives was built and there were also separate facilities for steam locomotives (and a turntable) on the site. In the event the new depot initially saw diesel locomotives. The yard offices were located here and 300 staff were employed on the site at opening. A hump was provided and there were eight fans of six sidings (named A-H) as well as eight reception sidings at the east end and six departure sidings at the west end.

The rail freight market was changing however and block or company trains were becoming more common. These trains were made up of a single wagon type often carrying the produce of a single company. As a result of this and many of the station goods yards being closed the yard contracted and by 1968 the hump and many of the sidings had become disused. Two other significant changes contributed to traffic patterns changing. Firstly the increase in car ownership led to an oil boom and the Thames Haven branch and West Thurrock areas both had refineries for this traffic. Secondly the Port of Tilbury decided on the containerisation model but because the Port of London failed to do so saw an increase in traffic as well.

The table below gives a summary of the block trains working on the LTS line in the May 1969 timetable. The number format is the number of weekday services followed in parentheses by the number of services that run on selected days during the week.

LTS line freight October 1969
Group	Weekday services	Remarks
Fords Automotive trains	5 (+1)	Fords traffic
Purfleet/West Thurrock	6 (+3)	Mostly oil traffic
Thames Haven	22 (+3)	Oil traffic
Tilbury FLT	7	Freightliner trains
Cross London Block trains	5	Thought to be trains returning mixed oil tanks (Eastbound only)
Remaining local workings	14	Included traffic to Leigh-on-Sea, Southend, Thames Haven and Upton Park

By 1971 Ripple Lane was redeveloped further with a new freightliner (container) terminal being built and opened on 24 October 1971. Many sidings in the yard were lifted and given over to container stacking but new sidings were provided for other traffic.

==== Freight in the 1980s to the current day ====
Hornchurch and Upton Park goods yards finally closed in 1982 and 1984; coal for domestic use had been the last traffic handled at these locations. The Ripple Lane Railhead depot closed in 1984 (it was a coal depot at this stage). Steel traffic and later newspaper print were handled in the area.

British Rail's mixed wagon load network Speedlink which had been formed in 1977 in an attempt to revitalise wagon load freight had been declining during the 1980s and succumbed in 1992.

The 1990s saw a decline in the Thames Haven oil traffic as a result of pipelines and improvements to the motorway network. This had by 1993 been drastically cut by the fact that Shell pulled out of rail traffic. These two events saw the closure of Ripple Lane TMD in early 1994.

In 2004 and 2005 construction sidings were built and used in the Ripple Lane area in connection with the construction of High Speed 1.

Intermodal (container) traffic continued to be handled at Barking and Tilbury Freightliner Terminals (FLT).

The military siding at Pigs Bay closed to traffic in the early 2000s. This site was used to store withdrawn rolling stock during this period.

Work on the London Gateway deep water port started in February 2010 and involved the re-alignment of the Thames Haven line. The first stage of the dock opened in 2013 and there were 9 Intermodal services operating by 2017.

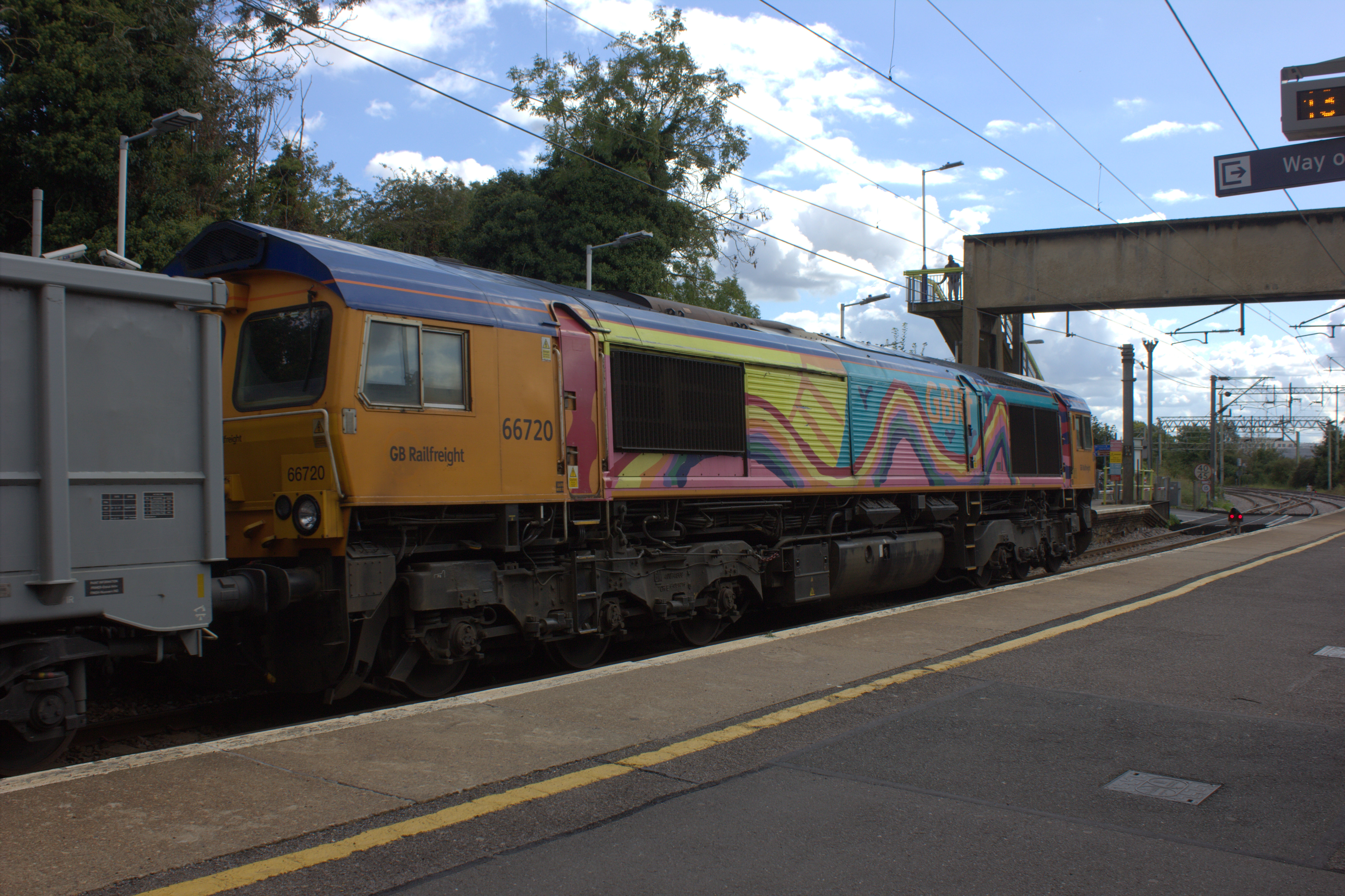
A modern Class 66 locomotive at Purfleet station on an aggregates service

2015 saw a new rail hub opened at Ripple Lane which had a direct connection onto High Speed 1 and in 2017 a through train from China arrived at this terminal.

Forth Ports opened a new intermodal terminal on the old site of the former Tilbury A and B Power station known as the Tilbury 2. The first train serving the terminal ran on 28 November 2020. Forth Ports also operate the other intermodal terminal in the Tilbury area which is known as the London Container Terminal.

=== Parcels traffic ===
Parcels trains ran from Fenchurch Street to Southend Central with a stop at Dagenham East in 1965. Parcels traffic ceased at Dagenham East c1969 and was also transferred from Southend Central to Southend East that year. Parcels traffic ceased in 1981.

=== Main Line Electrification ===
Electrification of the line and the connecting branches, under various system of traction current, took place in stages as follows:

November 1949

- Fenchurch Street to Bow Junction, electrified at 1.5 kV DC as part of the Great Eastern (Liverpool Street to Shenfield) electrification. Fenchurch Street Platforms 1 and 2 only and former slow (south) lines to Stepney East (now Limehouse) then to Bow Junction via Gas Factory Junction. Abandoned before completion, later wired for emergency use.

November 1960

- Fenchurch Street to Bow Junction converted from 1.5 kV DC to 6.25 kV AC.

November 1961

- Fenchurch Street to Stepney East (now Limehouse), Fenchurch Street Platforms 3 and 4 and fast (north) lines, electrified at 6.25 kV AC,
- Gas Factory Junction to Barking, electrified at 6.25 kV AC,
- Forest Gate Junction to Barking (except Platform 1), electrified at 6.25 kV AC,
- Barking to Southend Central via Upminster, electrified at 25 kV AC,
- Barking to Pitsea via Tilbury, electrified at 25 kV AC,
- Upminster to Grays, electrified at 25 kV AC,
- Southend Central to Shoeburyness, electrified at 6.25 kV AC.

1984

- Fenchurch Street to Barking, converted from 6.25 kV AC to 25 kV AC,
- Gas Factory Junction to Bow Junction, converted from 6.25 kV AC to 25 kV AC,
- Forest Gate Junction to Barking, converted from 6.25 kV AC to 25 kV AC,
- Southend Central to Shoeburyness, converted from 6.25 kV AC to 25 kV AC.

2017

- Barking Station Junction to Barking Station Platform 1, electrified at 25 kV AC.

=== Locomotives and Rolling Stock ===
==== Passenger ====
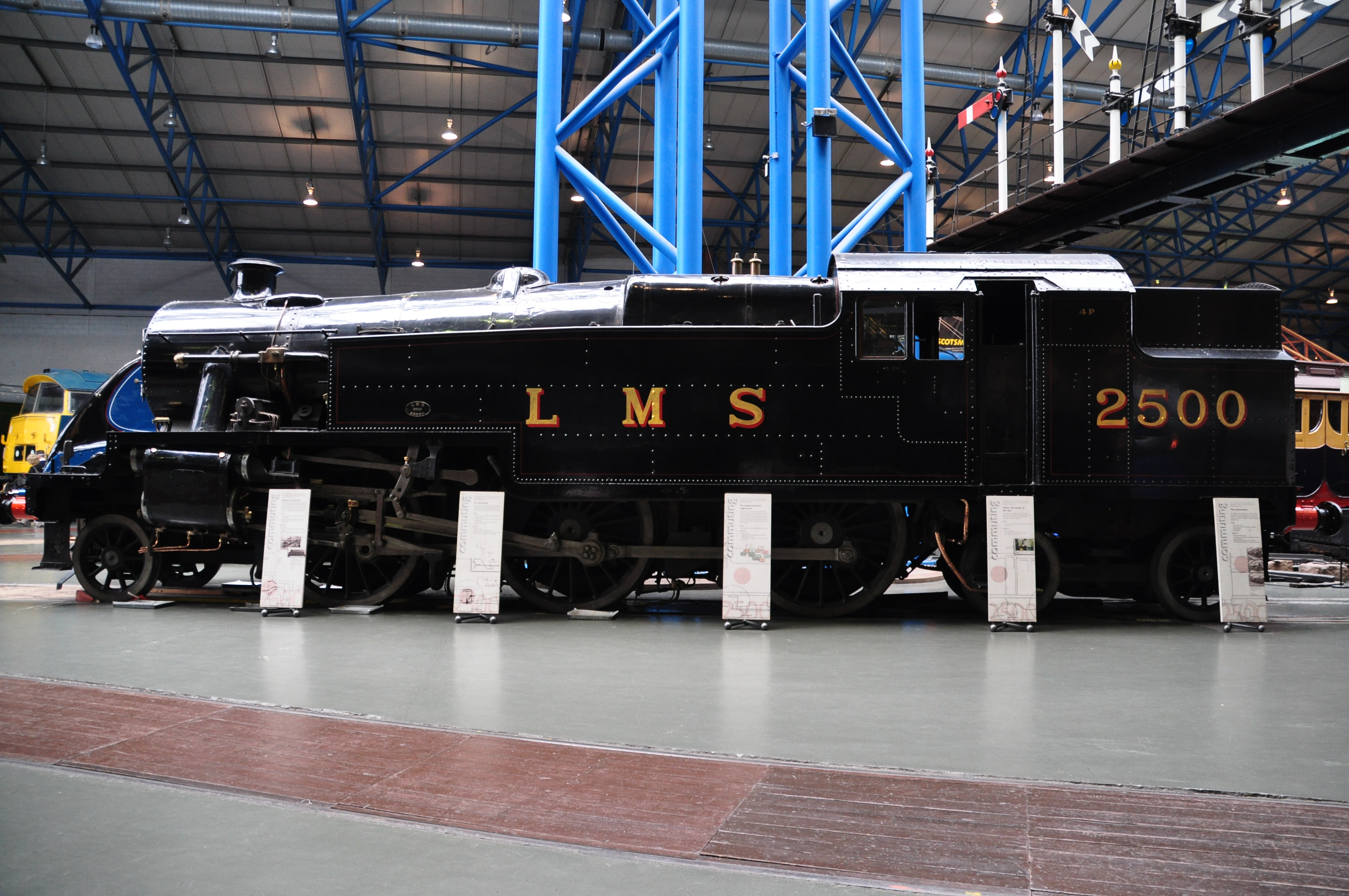
LMS 3-cylinder 2-6-4T No. 2500 built specifically for the LTSR section at the National Railway Museum

The line was known for its use of 4-4-2 tank engines such as the LT&SR 37 Class and LT&SR 79 Class. The LTS line was run by the London, Midland and Scottish Railway after 1923 and they provided a further 35 locomotives of the 79 Class between 1923 and 1930, before introducing the 3-Cylindered 2-6-4Ts designed by William Stanier in 1934. During World War II many of the 3-cylindered 2-6-4Ts were transferred away from the area and haulage reverted to older LT&SR locomotives, but the 3-cylindered tanks were back before the end of 1945. After the war ended, and shortly before nationalisation, 20 new LMS Fairburn Class 4 2-6-4Ts were allocated to the line which led to the withdrawal of some of the older LT&SR locomotives. From 12 November 1953 20 BR Standard Class 4 2-6-4Ts started working on the section and former LT&SR locomotives were reduced to working the Upminster to Grays service. By 1958 these were withdrawn and the last LT&SR passenger locomotive was transferred away to Peterborough in March 1958.

Holiday traffic from the 1920s was worked almost exclusively by LMS type locomotives with LMS Hughes Crab, LMS Stanier Class 5 4-6-0 and 4F 0-6-0.

On 23 January 1957 the Romford – Tilbury service went over to Diesel Multiple Unit (DMU) working and these trains also worked the Tilbury to Pitsea Shuttle services. Diesel working of early morning trains was common to allow work on the overhead electric line equipment and this practice continued until 1969. After that date, other than the Romford service the only appearance of DMUs was in connection with engineering works and special trains. The DMUs were allocated to Stratford engine shed and consisted of some of the early DMU class such as Class 109 Wickhams Units and Derby Lightweight units. DMUs were generally stabled at Tilbury overnight.

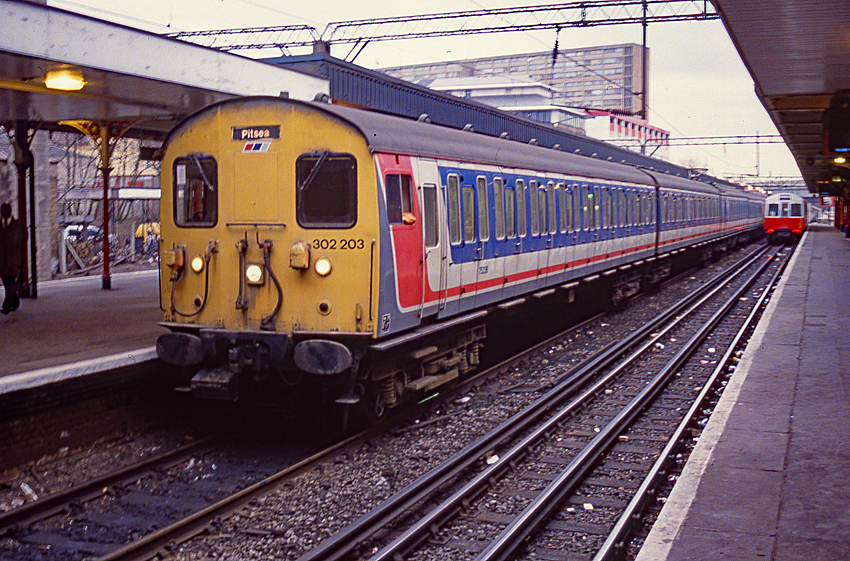
302 203 at Barking on a Pitsea service in 1993

After electrification in 1962 most services were operated by British Railways Class 302 electric multiple units (EMUs), which were withdrawn in 1998, leaving Class 310s, Class 312s and some loaned Class 317s in service until they were replaced by Class 357 EMUs. These are stabled at Shoeburyness and East Ham depots, where they are also maintained. Six Class 387 trains were used at peak times to increase capacity between 2016 and 2022, however these were transferred to Great Northern and replaced by new Class 720/6 Aventra units.

==== Goods ====
Up until 1899 LT&SR trains were effectively mixed traffic working but that changed when two locomotives of the 0-6-0 49 class were introduced. In 1903 the first of 10 69 class 0-6-2Ts were ordered for freight traffic and this order was supplemented by a further four locomotives in 1912 ordered by the LT&SR but delivered to the Midland. These locomotives provided the internal LTS workings right up until 1962.

Other steam freight locomotives allocated to the LTS line included:

- MR 2F 0-6-0
- LMS Fowler Class 4F 0-6-0
- LNER Class J17 – 0-6-0 used on engineering trains in the 1950s
- LNER Class J39 – 0-6-0 short lived and unpopular with LTS line crews
- WD Austerity 2-8-0 – heavy freight locomotives based at Plaistow and Tilbury.

The 4-4-2T and 2-6-4T types both worked freight trains throughout their time on the LTS line.

The first main line diesel to operate over the LTS line was the unique British Rail 10800 which was allocated to Plaistow engine shed and was deployed on freight trains. Devons Road (Bow) engine shed based Class 20 locomotives were seen on freights from 1957 and later in the year LTS drivers were being trained on Class 30 locomotives and a little later the failure prone Class 21. These locomotives worked freight and passenger services.

Class 04 diesel shunters were regularly allocated to Plaistow from 1957.These displaced the LMS built "Jinty" LMS Fowler Class 3F shunting and short distance goods services. When Ripple Lane Marshalling Yard opened Class 11 shunters were employed on shunting duties.

By the 1970s most goods trains were generally in the hands of Class 31, Class 37 and Class 47 locomotives whilst shunting was carried out by Class 08 shunters.

By the 1980s Class 56 and Class 59 could be seen on aggregates trains from the Western Region. Electrification of part of the Ripple Lane complex and Tilbury FLT in 1988 saw electric locomotives such as Class 90 employed on container trains.

In 2021 diesel worked freight services are in the hands of Class 66 and Class 70 locomotives.

==== Preservation ====
Of the original LTSR locomotive fleet, only 79 class 4-4-2T number 80 named Thundersley survives as a stationary exhibit at Bressingham Steam Museum in Norfolk.

Two locomotives that worked later steam services in the area are preserved – 2500 is the sole remaining member of the 37 3 cylinder 2-6-4 tank engines built by the LMS in the 1930s for the LTS line. It is preserved in LMS livery at the National Railway Museum in York. BR Standard Class 4 80079, which was involved in the 1958 Dagenham East rail crash, is preserved on the Severn Valley Railway in Shropshire. Both 42500 (as it was then numbered) and 80079 worked last day steam services out of Fenchurch Street.

Two Class 302 driving trailers are preserved at Mangapps Farm Railway Museum near Burnham-on-Crouch, Essex.

=== Stations (2021) ===
Station	Local authority	London fare zone	Usage^{a}	Opened^{b}	Service frequency^{c}	Interchange/notes
Main line
London Fenchurch Street	City of London	1	18.399	1854	8 tph	London Underground (Circle and District lines, from Tower Hill); Docklands Light Railway (from Tower Gateway)
Limehouse	Tower Hamlets	2	3.505	1854	8 tph	Docklands Light Railway
West Ham	Newham	3	10.554	1901^{d}	8 tph	London Underground (District, Hammersmith & City and Jubilee lines); Docklands Light Railway
Barking	Barking & Dagenham	4	13.473	1854	8 tph	Tilbury loop; London Underground (District and Hammersmith & City lines); London Overground (Gospel Oak to Barking line)
Upminster	Havering	6	5.962	1885	6 tph	Ockendon branch; London Underground (District line); London Overground (Romford to Upminster Line)
West Horndon	Brentwood	outside zones	0.416	1888	2 tph	
Laindon	Basildon	outside zones	2.287	1888	4 tph	
Basildon	Basildon	outside zones	3.233	1974	4 tph	
Pitsea	Basildon	outside zones	1.270	1855	4 tph	Tilbury loop
Benfleet	Castle Point	outside zones	3.680	1855	6 tph	
Leigh-on-Sea	Southend-on-Sea	outside zones	2.232	1856	6 tph	In 1934, the current Leigh on Sea station replaced the original one, and Chalkwell station was opened.
Chalkwell	Southend-on-Sea	outside zones	1.968	1934	6 tph	
Westcliff	Southend-on-Sea	outside zones	1.299	1895	6 tph	
Southend Central	Southend-on-Sea	outside zones	3.396	1856	6 tph	
Southend East	Southend-on-Sea	outside zones	1.926	1932	4 tph	
Thorpe Bay	Southend-on-Sea	outside zones	0.885	1884	4 tph	
Shoeburyness	Southend-on-Sea	outside zones	0.746	1884	4 tph	
Ockendon branch
Ockendon	Thurrock	G	1.054	1892	2 tph	
Chafford Hundred Lakeside	Thurrock	G	2.817	1993	2 tph	
Tilbury loop
Dagenham Dock	Barking & Dagenham	5	0.401	1908	2 tph	
Rainham	Havering	6	1.756	1854	2 tph	
Purfleet	Thurrock	G	0.673	1854	2 tph	
Grays	Thurrock	G	4.053	1854	4 tph	Ockendon branch
Tilbury Town	Thurrock	outside zones	1.173	1885	2 tph	
East Tilbury	Thurrock	outside zones	0.443	1936	2 tph	
Stanford-le-Hope	Thurrock	outside zones	1.109	1854	2 tph	

- ^a Number of passenger entries/exits in millions in 2017/18
- ^b Year station was first served by the LTSR (could have been served earlier by another railway)
- ^c Typical off-peak Monday-Saturday service frequency in trains per hour (tph)
- ^d Service suspended in 1913 but reintroduced in 1999

==== Route via Stratford and Liverpool Street ====
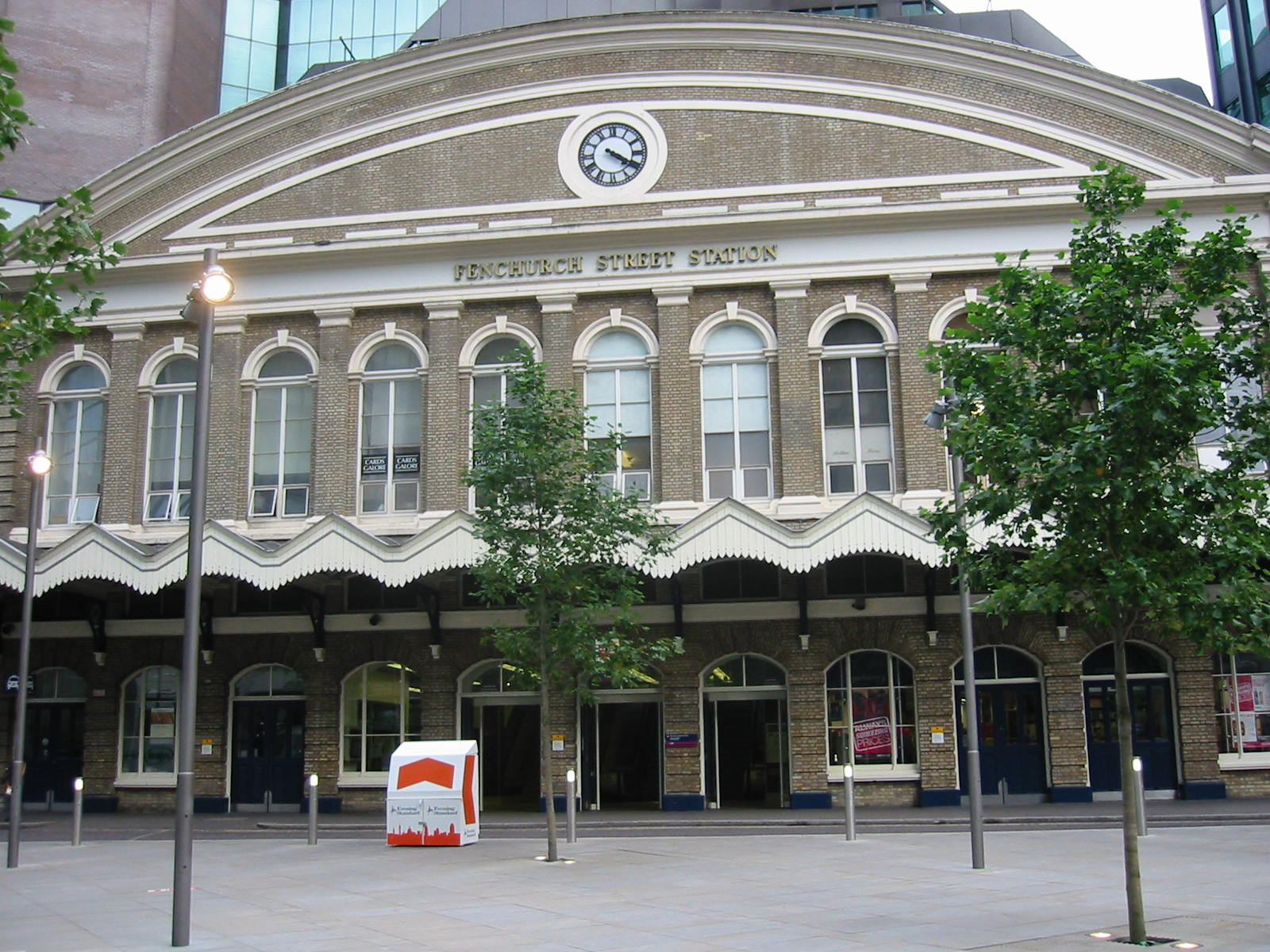
The main terminus of the LTSR is Fenchurch Street

When necessary, due to engineering work or service disruption, trains can be diverted at Barking over the Gospel Oak to Barking line and then the Great Eastern Main Line to call at Stratford and Liverpool Street instead of the usual LTSR route via West Ham. Trains diverted at Barking, having passed Stratford, can also rejoin the LTSR before Limehouse and then continue to Fenchurch Street. This latter route is not currently used in the standard timetable, however at weekends there are two trains per hour to and from Shoeburyness that call at Stratford and Liverpool Street.

From May 1985 to May 2007, the standard weekday service after 22:30 operated out of Liverpool Street rather than Fenchurch Street. Currently, this is only used during weekends, when some Basildon services are diverted into Liverpool Street, as well as during engineering works that prohibit access to Fenchurch Street.

==== Former stations ====
Closed stations on the LTS line
Station	Location (miles & chains from Fenchurch Street station)	Date Opened	Date Closed	Notes
Main line
Minories	c. 0.18	6 July 1840	24 October 1853	Original terminus of London and Blackwall Railway
Leman Street	c. 0.40	1 June 1877	7 July 1941	
Cannon Street Road	c. 0.60	21 August 1842	December 1848	
Shadwell	c. 1.10	1 October 1840	7 July 1941	DLR station opened 31 August 1987
Burdett Road	c. 2.26	11 September 1871	21 April 1944	
Bromley-by-Bow	3. 18	31 March 1858	15 June 1962	LUL platforms remain in use
Plaistow	4. 45	31 March 1858	15 June 1962	LUL platforms remain in use
Upton Park	5.28	1 September 1877	15 June 1962	LUL platforms remain in use
East Ham	6.18	31 March 1858	15 June 1962	LUL platforms remain in use
Becontree	9. 48	28 June 1926	15 June 1962	LUL platforms remain in use
Dagenham East	11.25	1 May 1885	15 June 1962	LUL platforms remain in use
Hornchurch	13.56	1 May 1885	15 June 1962	LUL platforms remain in use
Leigh-on-Sea (original site)	c. 33.0	1 July 1855	31 December 1933	
Tilbury Loop
Purfleet Rifle Range Halt	About 3/4 mile north west of Purfleet station	October 1921	31 May 1948	
Tilbury Riverside	22.45	13 April 1854	30 November 1992	
Tilbury Marine		15 May 1927	1 May 1932	
Low Street	24.16	July 1861	5 June 1967	

=== Signalling schemes ===
This section summarises the major re-signalling schemes on the LTS line from 1912.

==== 1935 ====
The LNER re-organised the approaches to Fenchurch Street and new signalling was introduced.

==== 1958 ====
In connection with electrification and the separation of the District line the following changes were made:

Crossovers between the Local and Through lines removed Signalling on the Local Lines taken over by LT Semaphore signalling replaced by colour light signalling

==== 1996 ====
Over the years the line had been used in an almost experimental fashion and contained a host of different signalling systems, such as geographical, WESTPAC and relay interlockings. In 1995 work began to replace everything from signals and point machines to whole junctions.The main contractor for the work was GEC Alsthom which provided a Mark 3 Solid State Interlocking (SSI) system, with SEMA providing the IECC element at Upminster that replaced all signal boxes on the whole line. Main line running signals mostly became four-aspect colour lights (replacing searchlight signals amongst others), all point machines were replaced with HW2000 machines and the whole line had a complete fibre optic network installed. All level crossings were renewed with automatic barriers to be CCTV-controlled by a designated workstation at Upminster.

The main line between East Ham and Shoeburyness was also bi-directionally signalled (with three-aspect signalling) along most parts, with the bi-directional section alternating from one track to the other between certain stations, to provide maximum flexibility for continuing operations should disruption occur.

The line was re-signalled over the Easter weekend of 1996 when all the signal boxes from Fenchurch Street to Shoeburyness (via Basildon) were switched out and control was transferred to Upminster IECC. This was later followed over the 1996 August bank holiday when Upminster took control from the remaining boxes on the Tilbury Loop.

== Proposed developments ==
=== Beam Park station ===
A new railway station, Beam Park railway station, is proposed at Beam Park, between Dagenham Dock and Rainham, near Marsh Way road and CEME Innovation Centre (between A13 and A1306).

=== Tilbury Docks ===
A company called Walsh are planning to build two new freight hubs at the port – a logistics terminal with aggregates processing plant and a rail-linked freight facility.

=== Purfleet station ===
There are plans to close and relocate Purfleet railway station slightly north as part of plans for thousands of homes in the area. A planning application for the new station was submitted in May 2023.

== Ownership and management summary ==
The railway was initially jointly promoted by the Eastern Counties Railway and London and Blackwall Railway and was leased for 21 years to Peto, Brassey and Betts. The lease expired in 1875, leaving the LTSR to take over operation itself. The Midland Railway and LTSR jointly constructed the Tottenham and Forest Gate Railway, which enabled through-running of trains between St. Pancras and the Tilbury docks from 1894 and Southend from 1895.

In 1912 the London, Tilbury and Southend Railway was vested in the Midland Railway following an Act of 7 August 1912, though Midland did not assume full control until 1 October 1920. Upon company grouping in 1923, the line became part of the London, Midland and Scottish Railway. That organisation was nationalised into British Railways in 1948, the line becoming part of the London Midland Region, however, in 1949 the LTS line became part of the Eastern Region of British Railways.

In 1986 the route was transferred to the Network SouthEast sector of British Rail. During this period, it was known as Network SouthEast's "misery line".

On privatisation in 1996, ownership of the infrastructure passed to Railtrack and Prism Rail took over operations of the franchise, marketing the route as LTS Rail. LTS Rail rebranded as c2c in May 2000 and Prism Rail was bought by National Express in July that year. National Express sold c2c to the Italian operator Trenitalia in February 2017.

Infrastructure management passed from Railtrack to Network Rail in 2002.

In July 2025, Trentalia-owned c2c's contract was terminated and the service was renationalised and services are now operated by government-owned company DfT Operator, which continues to operate the services as c2c.

== Shipping activity ==
Until 1855, the ferry crossing between Tilbury and Gravesend in Kent was operated by sailing and rowing boats; however, in that year, steam driven vessels were introduced on the River Thames crossing. On formation of the LTSR, that operation became part of its activities.

Responsibility for the ferry operation was transferred to the Midland Railway Company and the London, Midland and Scottish Railway in 1912 and 1923 respectively.
