= Rainham railway station (London) =

Railway station in London, United Kingdom

Rainham
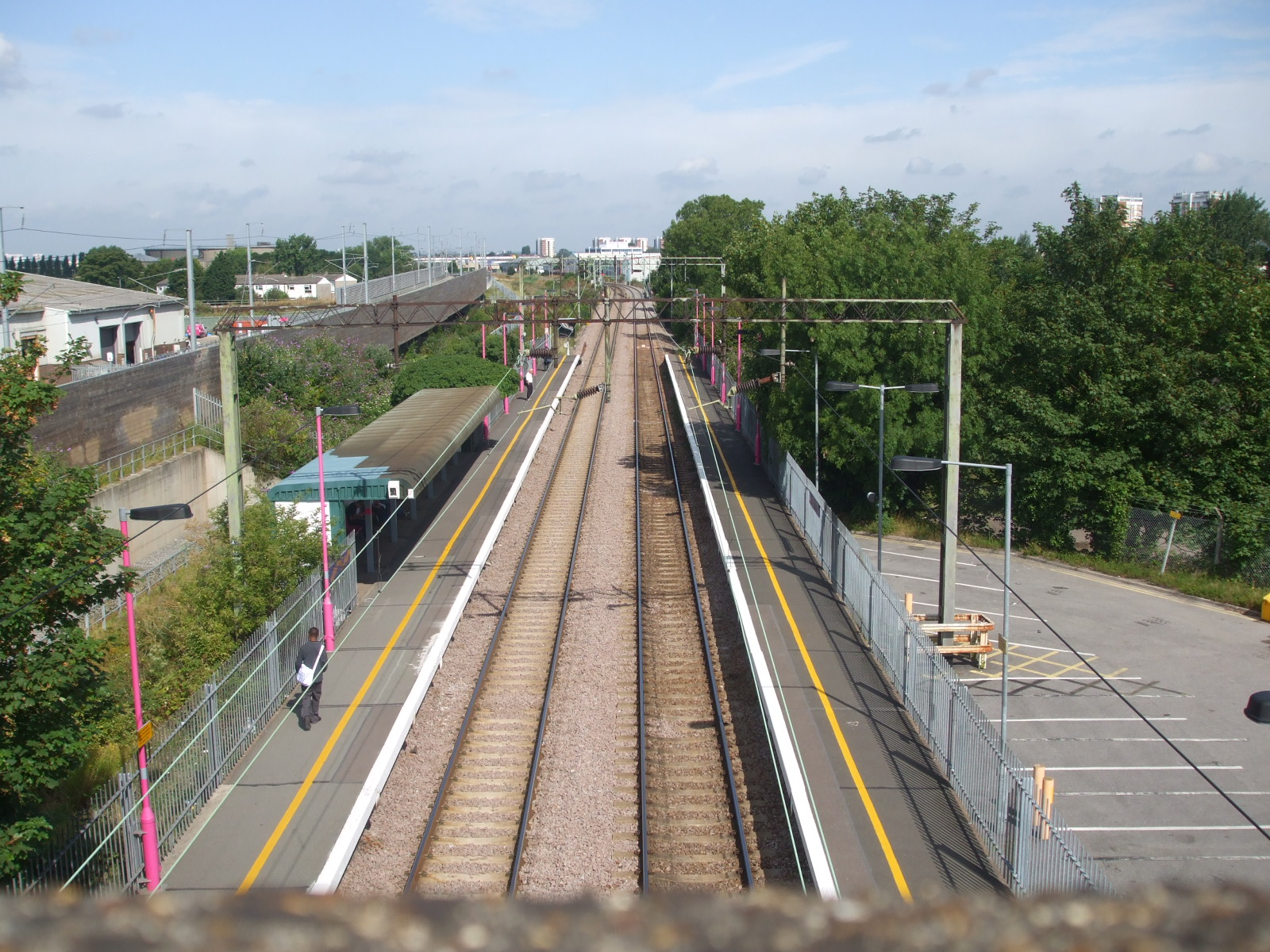
- Interactive map of Rainham

General information
- Location: Rainham
- Local authority: London Borough of Havering
- Managed by: c2c
- Owner: Network Rail
- Station code: RNM
- DfT category: C2
- Number of platforms: 2
- Accessible: Yes
- Fare zone: 6

National Rail annual entry and exit
- 2020–21: ▼0.516 million
- 2021–22: ▲1.005 million
- 2022–23: ▲1.272 million
- 2023–24: ▲1.407 million
- 2024–25: ▲1.525 million

Key dates
- 1854: Opened

Other information
- External links: Departures; Facilities
- Coordinates: 51.5169°N 0.1905°E

Rainham railway station is on the London, Tilbury and Southend line, serving the town of Rainham in the London Borough of Havering, east London. Historically in the county of Essex, in official literature the station is sometimes shown as Rainham (Essex) in order to distinguish it from the station of the same name in Kent.

It is 12 miles 54 chains (20.4 km) down the line from London Fenchurch Street and it is situated between Dagenham Dock to the west and Purfleet to the east. Its three-letter station code is RNM and it is within London fare zone 6.

It was opened in 1854. The station and all trains serving it are currently operated by c2c.

== History ==
=== Early years (1854–1922) ===
Rainham station was opened on 13 April 1854 by the London Tilbury and Southend Railway (LT&SR) as part of their main line which ran initially to Tilbury and by 1856 to Southend Central. Trains were initially operated by locomotives from the Eastern Counties Railway as the LT&SR had no locomotives of its own. Trains operated to Fenchurch Street and detached carriages at Stratford for Bishopsgate. This operation did not last long as Stratford was becoming a very busy location and timekeeping was poor. In 1858 a more direct line from Barking to Gas Factory Junction (Bow) was opened and trains stopped serving Bishopsgate.

The station was on an embankment just east of Rainham Creek. When opened the station had two wooden platforms and the station building was also made of wood (one of three on the LT&SR). A shelter was provided on the up side and a goods depot located to the east of the station and handled locally grown market garden produce and manure (horse droppings from London) for the gardens. A cattle siding was located on the upside. At the end of the goods yard the line was crossed by Ferry Road Level Crossing and a signal box was established here in 1881. East of this were two further goods sidings which had been installed in 1859.

From the early 1880s the LT&SR had its own locomotives built and these were seen on passenger and goods trains.

The station building burnt down on 21 January 1891 and was replaced by another wooden building.

In that year a footbridge (second hand from East Ham) was installed replacing the previous track crossing at the west end of the goods yard.

In 1912 the Midland Railway bought the LT&SR on 7 August 1912 so Rainham became a Midland Railway station.

=== London Midland and Scottish Railway (1923–1948) ===
Following the Railways Act 1921 the station became the responsibility of the London Midland and Scottish (LMS) Railway from 1 January 1923. The original signal box was replaced by a Midland Railway type signal box in 1924 which was located by the level crossing. Larger 3-Cylindered 2-6-4Ts designed by William Stanier were introduced in 1934 and seen on passenger services. During World War II many of the 3-cylindered 2-6-4Ts were transferred away from the area and haulage reverted to older LT&SR locomotives, but the 3-cylindered tanks were back before the end of 1945.

Just after World War II started in September 1939, the passenger service was reduced as a wartime economy measure.

=== British Railways (1948-1994) ===
Following nationalisation of Britain's railways in 1948, the station transferred under British Railways to the London Midland Region. On 20 February 1949, the whole LTS line was transferred to the Eastern Region, yet despite the organisational changes, the old LTSR still was a distinctive system operated by former LTS and LMS locomotives until electrification.

During the 1950s it was decided to relocate the station to the west and as a result the 1854 goods yard was closed (as this was the new station site) and relocated to the side of the two 1859 sidings to which a third siding and headshunt was added. This relocation proved short lived as the goods yard closed in 1965. The new station had concrete platforms and a new station building and was opened in January 1962.

As this was happening the LTS was being electrified and re-signalled and a full electric timetable started operating in June 1962 which was primarily worked by Class 302 EMUs.

The LTS line and Rainham station became part of the London and South Eastern sector of British Rail in 1982, and in June 1986 this was rebranded as Network South East (NSE). With the Conservative government of the early 1990s looking to privatise the railways, the operation of the NSE passenger train service was put under the control of a Train Operating Unit.

=== Privatisation era (1994–2025) ===
In 1996 the 1924 signal box closed with all signalling and level crossing control in the area transferring to Upminster Signalling Centre.

==== Franchises ====
On privatisation in 1996, infrastructure ownership passed to Railtrack and Prism Rail took over operations of the franchise, marketing the route as LTS Rail. Prism Rail were bought out by National Express in 2000 and in 2002 the line was rebranded as c2c.

Ownership of the infrastructure passed to Network Rail in 2002.

National Express sold the operation of the franchise to Trenitalia in 2017.

The station and all trains serving it are currently operated by c2c and are operated by Class 357 and Class 720/6 EMUs.

A more detailed history of the franchises can be found on the c2c page.

Private operation of the London, Tilbury and Southend line by Trenitalia c2c ceased on 20 July 2025, with the new publicly owned operator c2c taking over.

==== High Speed 1 ====
The new High Speed 1 line was built in 2005/6 (and opened in 2007) cutting off Rainham station from the marshes. A new disabled friendly footbridge was built to enable access to the station.

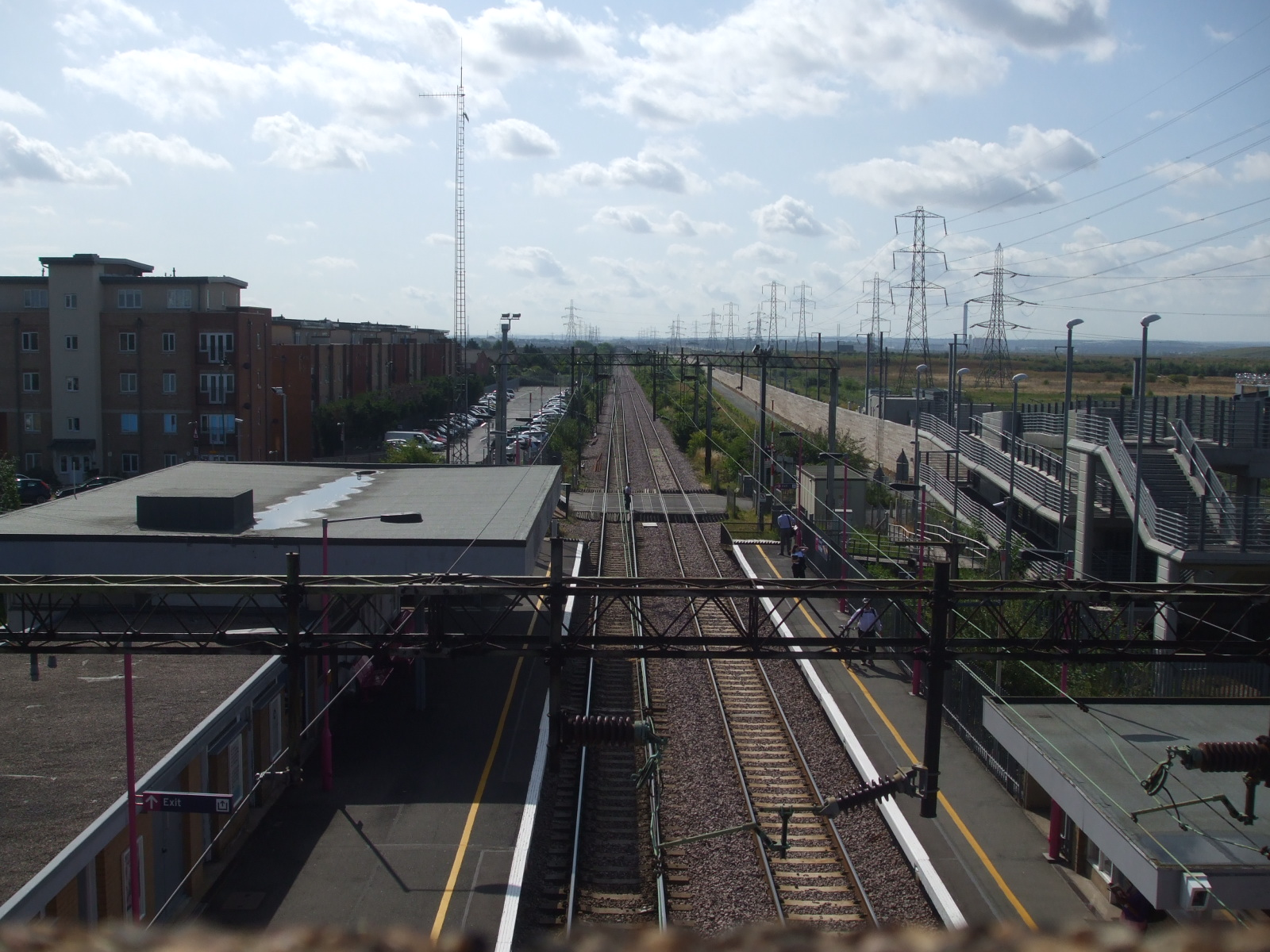
Rainham station (Essex) looking east – new footbridge and HS1 on right hand side

== Location ==
The station is located on Ferry Lane, close to the junction with Wennington Road. Major industrial works surround the station, as does Rainham Creek, a local industrial river. Access is provided from the station building to the country-bound platform; in order to access the London-bound platforms, a pedestrian bridge must be crossed. There are ticket barriers at the front entrance to the platform, restricting platform access to ticket-holders only.

A number of level crossings are situated on the line between Barking and Grays. The roads served by the crossings have now been severed by the High Speed 1 line between Ebbsfleet and London St. Pancras, but the level crossings are still in situ, such as the one on Ferry Lane. This can be used to access the London-bound platform. A number of footbridges and road bridges have been built to replace them.

There is access to the Rainham Marshes via a footbridge immediately south of the station, although Purfleet station is the closest railway station.

Beam Park railway station is a new station under construction to the west of Rainham.

== Services ==
As of the June 2024 timetable the typical Monday to Friday off-peak service is:

- 2 tph (trains per hour) westbound to London Fenchurch Street
- 2 tph eastbound to Grays

== Connections ==
London Buses routes 103, and 372 serve the station directly. London Buses routes 165, 287 and school route 652 serve the station from Rainham War Memorial stop. London Superloop route SL12 serves the southern side of the station on Lamson Road.

Preceding station	National Rail	Following station
Dagenham Dock	c2c London, Tilbury and Southend line Tilbury Loop	Purfleet
	Disused railways	
Dagenham Dock	Network SouthEast; London, Tilbury and Southend line	Purfleet Rifle Range
