= Purfleet railway station =

Network Rail station in Essex, England

Purfleet
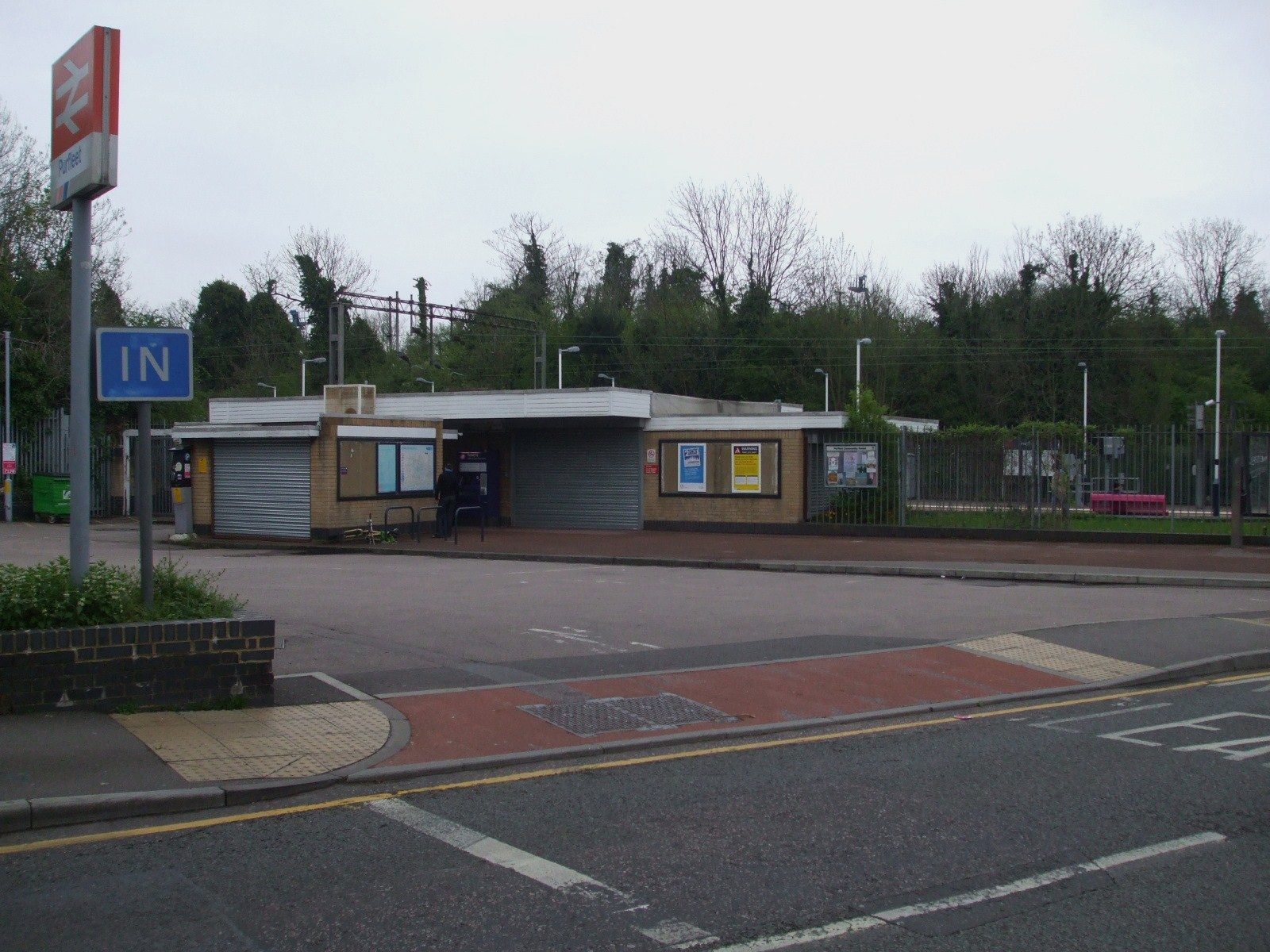
- Interactive map of Purfleet

General information
- Location: Purfleet
- Local authority: Thurrock
- Managed by: c2c
- Owner: Network Rail
- Station code: PFL
- DfT category: D
- Number of platforms: 2
- Accessible: Yes
- Fare zone: A

National Rail annual entry and exit
- 2020–21: ▼0.255 million
- 2021–22: ▲0.445 million
- 2022–23: ▲0.509 million
- 2023–24: ▲0.550 million
- 2024–25: ▲0.573 million

Key dates
- 1854: Opened

Other information
- External links: Departures; Facilities
- Coordinates: 51.481°N 0.237°E

Purfleet railway station is on the London, Tilbury and Southend line serving the town of Purfleet, Essex. It is 16 miles 2 chains (25.8 km) down the line from London Fenchurch Street and it is situated between Rainham to the west and Grays to the east. Its three-letter station code is PFL.

It was opened in 1854 by the London Tilbury and Southend Railway and initially trains ran from Tilbury to Stratford where the train split for either Spitalfields or Fenchurch Street. The station and all trains serving it are currently operated by c2c. Although outside London fare zone 6, the station became part of the Oyster card pay-as-you-go network in 2010.

== History ==
=== Early years (1854–1922) ===
West of Purfleet the railway had crossed marshland before turning south towards Purfleet. This route made use of a number of worked out chalk pits some of which had early tramways down to wharves on the River Thames. The station consisting of two platforms was opened by the London Tilbury and Southend Railway (LT&SR) on 13 April 1854 and trains served Tilbury and, by 1856, were working through to Southend. A single siding goods yard was provided on the up side west of the station.

Adjacent to the station on the down side were the Botany Pleasure Gardens which occupied some of the old chalk pits. These chalk pits which had quarried chalk for agricultural purposes had employed around 400 people in 1848 but had largely closed by the 1850s and were overgrown. These were accessed by a footbridge that passed over the station and the gardens were a source of excursion traffic through to the 1900s when they closed for good.

After that the chalk extraction recommenced with the tramway passing in a new tunnel under the station to a wharf on the Thames. Between 1900 and 1903 various improvements to the station were made including longer platforms, a footbridge and a second siding in the goods yard.

The Midland Railway took over the LT&SR on 7 August 1912 and Purfleet became a Midland Railway station.

In 1914 a large army camp was established north of the station and as a result Purfleet got extended booking and luggage storage facilities on the up side.

=== London Midland and Scottish Railway (1923–1948) ===
Following the Railways Act 1921 the station became the responsibility of the London Midland and Scottish Railway (LMS) from 1 January 1923.

Around 1930 the Botany chalk pit fell out of use and later in that decade the Botany footbridge (by then long disused) was removed.

During the 1930s the LMS were considering four tracking east of Purfleet and land was set aside on the down (north) side of the line to accommodate this.

After World War II started there were significant cuts to passenger services on the line in the timetable of 25 September 1939.

A German V2 rocket fell on the railway east of the station on 24 July 1944 resulting in the railway being closed until the following day while repairs were made.

=== British Railways (1948–1994) ===
Following nationalisation of Britain's railways in 1948, the station transferred under British Railways to the London Midland Region. On 20 February 1949, the whole LTS line was transferred to the Eastern Region, yet despite the organisational changes, the old LT&SR still was a distinctive system operated by former LT&SR and LMS locomotives until electrification.

The line between Purfleet and West Thurrock Junction was flooded during the North Sea flood of 1953 on the night of 1 February 1953. The line suffered considerable damage and was re-opened to traffic on 19 February 1953. Many of the private sidings (see below) and their associated works were also flooded notably the Jurgens factory and the Thames Board Works.

Early in 1961 a modern station building was built with access off London Road rather than the station approach. A new footbridge was also built at this time.

A full electric timetable started operating in June 1962 and this was primarily worked by Class 302 EMUs.

The goods yard was closed to goods traffic on 2 November 1964 although the track remained for the two private sidings that were still operating there.

The LTS line and Purfleet station became part of the London and South Eastern sector of British Rail in 1982, and in June 1986 this was rebranded as Network South East (NSE). With the Conservative government of the early 1990s looking to privatise the railways, the operation of the NSE passenger train service was put under the control of a Train Operating Unit.

=== Privatisation era (1994–2025) ===
On privatisation in 1996, infrastructure ownership passed to Railtrack and Prism Rail took over operations of the franchise, marketing the route as LTS Rail. Prism Rail were bought out by National Express in 2000 and in 2002 the line was rebranded as c2c.

Ownership of the infrastructure passed to Network Rail in 2002.

National Express sold the operation of the franchise to Trenitalia in 2017.

The station and all trains serving it are currently operated by c2c and are operated by Class 357 and Class 720/6 EMUs.

A detailed history of the franchises can be found on the c2c page.

Private operation of the London, Tilbury and Southend line by Trenitalia c2c ceased on 20 July 2025, with the new publicly owned operator c2c taking over.

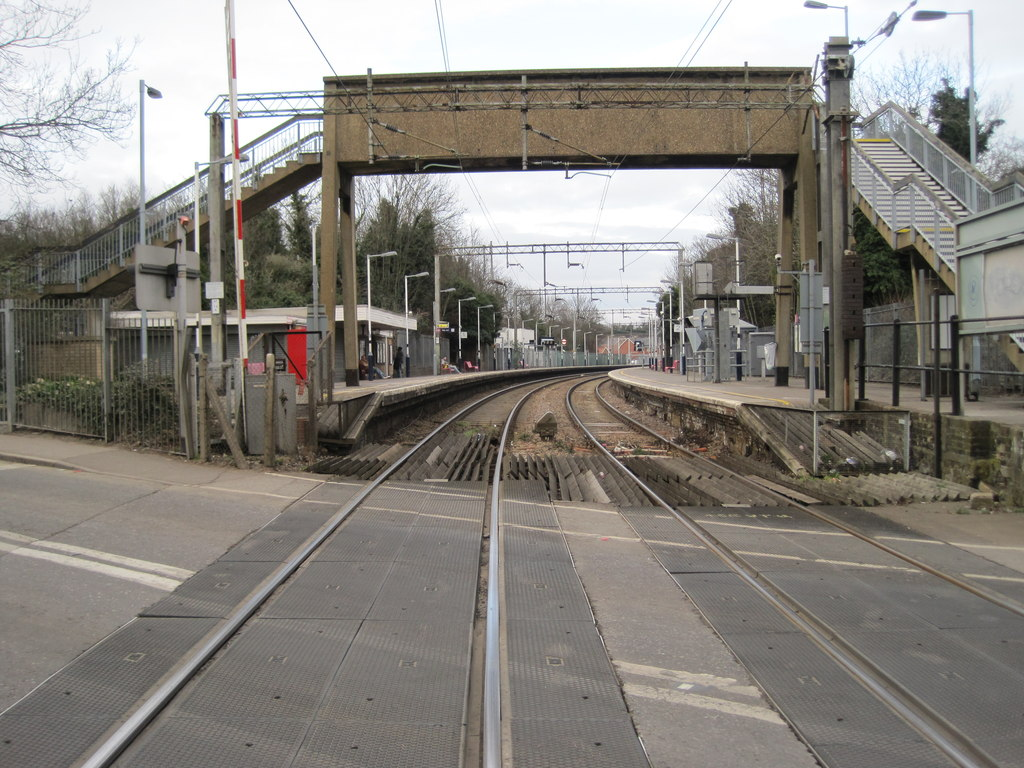
Purfleet railway station looking towards London

== Future plans ==
As part of a development involving up to 3000 new homes, there are plans to re-site, rename and upgrade the railway station. The station will be located slightly further north. The ticket office is to be moved overhead rather than to the side of the station and lifts and a new footbridge are proposed as well as a new larger car park and future space for retail. The level crossing may also be closed as part of these plans and replaced with a road bridge. One other thing proposed is that the name of the station be renamed to Purfleet on Thames, after the town was renamed in 2020 to attract more visitors. A planning application was submitted in May 2023.

== Operations ==
=== Services ===
==== September 1882 ====
The first down weekday (Note: Weekday was Monday to Saturday in 1882.) train that stopped at Purfleet departed Fenchurch Street at 9:03am arriving at 09:47. The next service was three hours later at 12:03pm and three hours later after that at 3:03pm. The next service was at 4:23pm although this service did not call on Saturday. There was then a gap to 6:15pm with evening trains at 7:45pm and finally 9:15 arriving at Purfleet just before 10pm. This is a total of seven weekday trains and surprisingly Sunday had six down services calling.

The first up all stations train ran at 7:50am which arrived in Fenchurch Street at 8:33, followed by a service two hours later at 9:49am. The next service ran in the afternoon at 12:20pm then there were three further trains before the last up departure at 9:46pm getting into Fenchurch Street at 10:38pm. On Sunday there were six up services at Purfleet.

The reason the service was so sparse was the LT&SR only had 18 locomotives for passenger work and some of these had to work goods and other services as well. Commuting was the preserve of the well paid and on the LT&SR they were based in Southend and Gravesend (which they accessed via Tilbury station and ferries.

==== June 2024 ====
As of the June 2024 timetable the typical Monday to Friday off-peak service is:

- 2 tph (trains per hour) westbound to London Fenchurch Street
- 2 tph eastbound to Grays

=== Accidents ===
East of the station there were a number of Private Occupation Crossings connected to some of the industrial concerns along the route which were worked by company staff.

On 18 February 1924 a motorist was killed on the Thames Board Mill crossing due to (road) driver error.

In 1983 the gateman at the Thames Board Mill crossing (the same location as above) mistakenly raised the barriers protecting the line and a car was hit by a train killing the car driver.

=== Signal Boxes ===
The original station box was on the up platform and opened in 1888. This was replaced in 1924 by a Midland Railway style box and a number of other infrastructure changes were made at the same time.

The signal box closed in 1996 when control transferred to Upminster signalling centre.

=== Private sidings ===
Because the railway was close to the River Thames at this point a number of private sidings and terminals existed in the area. These were set up in three major phases with some changing use over the years.

Between 1889 and 1891 the St Louis Park Paper Mill Co opened a siding east of the station and accessed off two new sidings provided by the LT&SR in 1891. In 1902 this became the Thames Board Mills and a major employer in Purfleet. Anglo American opened a wharf and sidings in the following year and in 1890 the Tank Storage opened a site called Caspian Wharf. This firm was taken over by Anglo-American in 1910.

In 1902 Purfleet Wharf and Saw Mills (after 1941 known as Purfleet Deep Wharf) occupied land east of Caspian Wharf and during World War I the site was taken over by the Royal Engineers. In 1906 the Steam Ship Coal Owners opened a site on the river south of the station and this site had its own internal rail system.

In 1912, BP opened a site east of Purfleet Wharf and during 1917/18 a factory was built by Jurgens (later Van der Berghs) and opened east of this for the manufacture of margarine. (Note: This factory was closed for about six weeks after the 1953 floods and leading to a national shortage of margarine. Another plant in Bromborough, Cheshire increased production to alleviate this issue.)

The majority of traffic was outward in nature.

In the early 1920s the Thames Board Mills opened a new factory and sidings on the down side of the line which were bought into operation with the new Purfleet signal box and infrastructure changes. In 1930 the Ebano Oil Company opened a line west of the station that connected from the goods yard and joined the former chalk pit route to the wharf. Ebano Oil became part of Anglo-American in 1935. Anglo-American was taken over by Esso in 1951. As late as 1962 Powell Duffryn had a siding that ran from the goods yard built to supply a tank farm in a disused chalk pit.

After that private siding operations gradually contracted the exception being Purfleet Terminal detailed below and an aggregates siding for Foster Yeoman installed in 1984.

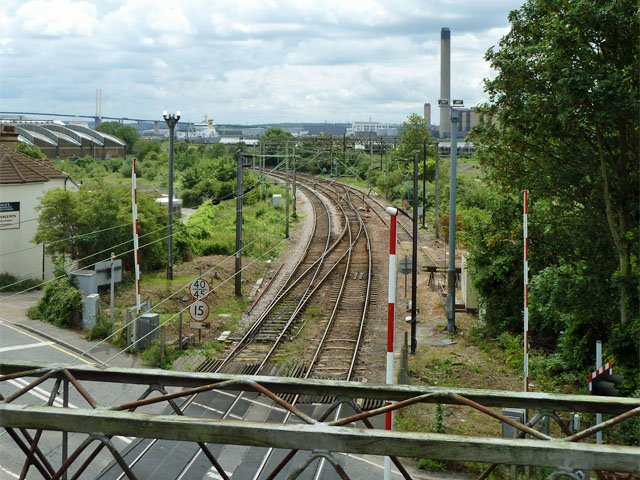
Railway east of Purfleet station and into private siding area

The December 2024 Network Rail Sectional Appendix Anglia Area shows the following rail connections in the Purfleet area.

- Foster Yeoman
- Purfleet Deep Wharf (Purfleet freight terminal)
- West Thurrock Tarmac Terminal

There are two out of use sidings – Thames Matex and the Van Den Burghs, (Note: The online version of the sectional appendix is updated twice per year so the page number for the area may differ. The reader should use the line ref EA1390 in the line maps)

=== Purfleet Freight Terminal ===
Purfleet Freight Terminal is the closest roll-on/roll-off (RORO) ferry port to London. Operated by C.RO Ports, the 92-acre (37 ha) combined freight terminal handles 250,000 lorry trailers and ISO containers and tanks per year, and via a dedicated pre-delivery inspection (PDI) facility, the import/export of 400,000 vehicles. There are four railway sidings on site, accessed via the London, Tilbury and Southend line to allow direct unloading/loading from ferry or lorry to rail. Scheduled ferry services are operated daily by sister-company Cobelfret Ferries to the Port of Zeebrugge, Belgium and the Port of Rotterdam, Netherlands.

=== West Thurrock Yard ===
This now closed yard was located east of the Purfleet sidings and served the following sidings:

- A short lived Kirk and Randall Chalk Siding used in connection with the construction of the Port of Tilbury for which they were the contractors.
- The Tunnel Cement Company 1916 -1976
- The Government sidings opened in 1917
- Thames Matex – 1965 – 1993
- Lafarge

The area was controlled by its own signal box.

== Notes ==
Preceding station	National Rail	Following station
Rainham	c2c London, Tilbury and Southend line via Rainham	Grays
