= Tilbury Marine railway station =

Disused railway station in Tilbury, Thurrock

Tilbury Marine

General information
- Location: Tilbury, Essex; England
- Coordinates: 51.4511°N 0.3588°E
- Grid reference: TQ640751

Other information
- Status: Disused

History
- Original company: London and Saint Katharine Docks Company
- Pre-grouping: London and Saint Katharine Docks Company
- Post-grouping: London, Midland and Scottish Railway

Key dates
- 17 April 1886: Opened
- December 1906: Closed
- 15 May 1927: Reopened and refurbished
- 1 May 1932: Closed
Location

Tilbury Marine railway station was served by Boat Trains at Tilbury, historically in Essex, England, from 1886 to 1932 on the Tilbury Marine branch of the London, Tilbury and Southend Railway which diverged just north of Tilbury Riverside station.

== History ==
The station was opened on 17 April 1886 by the London and Saint Katharine Docks Company and was named Tilbury Tidal Basin. Its only passenger services were boat trains connecting with Liners using the basin. The service was not successful and after December 1906 passenger traffic instead run to Tilbury Riverside. The station was then used for goods traffic.

It was reopened and refurbished and renamed Tilbury Marine by the London, Midland and Scottish Railway (LMS) on 15 May 1927 in connection with its new Dunkirk service. This included through coaches to Bradford and Manchester via the LMS route from St Pancras. Although reasonably successful in the summer the service was poorly used during the summer and the last services ran on 30 April 1932 with the station closing permanently on 1 May 1932.

After this point the station remained and was again used by goods traffic. It was bombed during World War 2 but the buildings mostly survived.

== See also ==
- Tilbury Riverside
- Tilbury Town
- East Tilbury
- Low Street
