= Low Street railway station =

Former railway station in England

Low Street

General information
- Location: West Tilbury, Essex; Thurrock; England
- Coordinates: 51.4727°N 0.4021°E
- Platforms: 2

History
- Original company: London, Tilbury and Southend Railway
- Pre-grouping: Midland Railway
- Post-grouping: London Midland and Scottish Railway

Key dates
- July 1861: Opened
- 5 June 1967: Closed
Location
Notes
- Served West Tilbury and East Tilbury

Low Street railway station was on the Tilbury loop line segment of the London, Tilbury and Southend line, at a level crossing near the villages of West Tilbury and East Tilbury, Essex.

It was situated between East Tilbury and Tilbury Riverside stations and was 24 miles 16 chains (38.95 km) down the line from London Fenchurch Street station via Tilbury.

It was opened in 1861 and closed on 5 June 1967.

== Description ==
Examination of the 1939 Ordnance Survey Map that covers the area shows that the station had two platforms. At the south/east end the line was crossed by Low Street (since renamed Station Road) itself. The signal box was located next to the crossing on the up (towards London) side of the line. On the opposite side of the line there was a loop that ran along the back of the down platform and a goods shed was located on this line.

The station building was on the up platform and remained unchanged throughout its life. It was a single storey brick built structure adjacent to the level crossing and consisted of Ticket Hall, a ticket Office, waiting room and gentleman's lavatory. Behind the up platform was an undeveloped piece of land and the up sidings were on the other side of this land.

== History ==
=== Early years (1854-1922) ===
The London Tilbury and Southend Railway (LT&SR) opened its main line in stages from Tilbury to Stanford-le-hope on 14 August 1854 and passenger operations commenced to Stanford-Le-Hope and by 1856 to Southend. It was situated between East Tilbury and Tilbury Riverside stations and was 24 miles 16 chains (38.95 km) down the line from London Fenchurch Street station via Tilbury.

Although the official opening date was July 1861, sources have been identified that make mention of a station at Low Street earlier than this date. Whether there was an earlier station or drivers just stopped their trains at Low Street level crossing is lost to the mists of time. The station did not appear in early LT&SR timetables (see also Dagenham Dock which had a similar arrangement) but mention of the station are made in the diaries of Martha Randall. On 24 June 1859 her diary records Lloyd and I walked down to the Low Street station as I was to go to Gravesend to Mama. The second entry records on 22 February 1861 Fanny and I went for a walk to the Low Street station. The local trade directory also records the station and a newspaper records three bullocks being hit and killed by a train there in January 1861.

The LT&SR operated the station until 1912 when they were bought by the Midland Railway who operated the station until the end of 1922.

=== London Midland and Scottish Railway (1923-1947) ===
Following the Railways Act 1921 the station became the responsibility of the London Midland and Scottish (LMS) railway from 1 January 1923.

=== British Railways (1948-1967) ===
Following nationalisation of Britain's railways in 1948, the station transferred under British Railways to the London Midland Region. On 20 February 1949, the whole LTS line was transferred to the Eastern Region, yet despite the organisational changes, the old LT&SR still was a distinctive system operated by former LTS and LMS locomotives until electrification.

The line was electrified in the late 1950s and both platforms were further lengthened. This meant the goods loop serving the shed was closed although it was not until 1964 that Low Street was closed to goods. Whether this means parcels were no longer handled or the oil terminal closed is unknown.

Station lighting was updated from gas to electric as part of the electrification process. Despite not being listed for closure in the Beeching Report of 1963 the station was closed on 5 June 1967.

== Operations ==
=== Signal Box ===
The first signal box was provided in 1881 and this was replaced by a Midland Railway style box as part of a wider re-signalling scheme in 1924.

Some changes to the signalling were made when the down platform was extended and the goods loop closed during the 1950s.

This box lasted until January 1995 when the crossing was bought under CCTV control and was monitored from Upminster Signalling Centre from 5 April 1996.

=== Timetables ===
The December 1895 Bradshaw's had nine down trains with some terminating at Pitsea and others working through to Southend Central and Shoeburyness. In the up direction there were nine trains to Fenchurch Street and on a Sunday there were three trains each way.

The standard off-peak service to Low Street in June 1962 - the first all electric service - was one train in each direction calling all stations to Fenchurch Street with a reversal at Tilbury Riverside. In the other direction it was all stations to Shoeburyness.

=== Goods ===
A permanent way yard was located on the up side and consisted of two curved sidings and a curved track that ran over Low Street where it split into two sidings serving a granite quarry (although this was disused by 1939). At some point the area within the station yard became an oil terminal for London Coastal Oil Wharves Ltd. This was later operated by Regent Oil which eventually became Texaco Oil.

There was a large goods shed located behind the down platform on the loop line supplied in the hope of freight traffic arising from, in the words of the LT&SR board "the large forts being erected at East Tilbury".

This unfortunately did not come to fruition and in both passenger and freight terms Low Street was perhaps the quietest station on the LT&SR network. Low Street was listed as handling general goods and parcels plus livestock and horseboxes in the 1904 Railway Clearing House's Handbook of Stations.

Preceding station	Historical railways	Following station
East Tilbury; Line and station open	London, Tilbury and Southend line	Stanford-le-Hope; Line and station open
	Disused railways	
Tilbury Riverside; Line and station closed	London, Tilbury and Southend line	Thames Haven; Line and station closed
