= 49 class =

49 class or Class 49 may refer to:

- Caledonian Railway 49 Class, 4-6-0 steam locomotives
- LT&SR 49 Class, 0-6-0 steam locomotives
- New South Wales 49 class locomotive, diesel-electric locomotives
- NSB Class 49, 2-8-4 steam locomotives
