= Tilbury Riverside railway station =

Former railway station in Essex, England

Tilbury Riverside
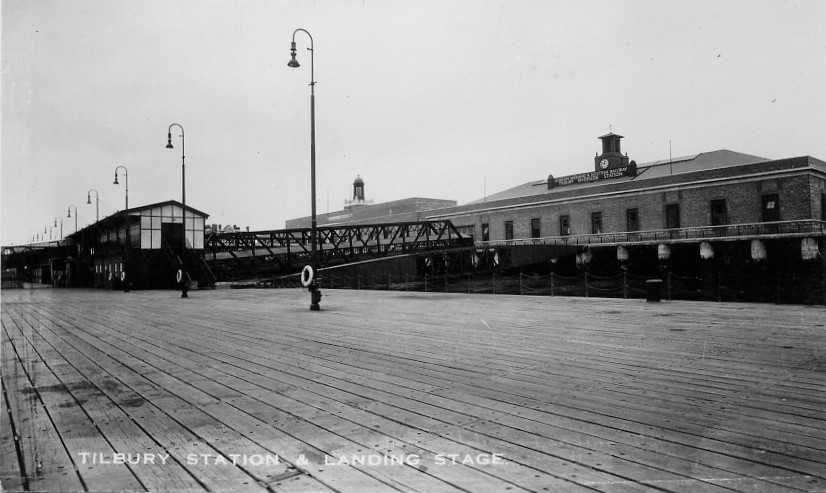

General information
- Location: Tilbury, Borough of Thurrock, England
- Coordinates: 51.4519°N 0.3646°E
- Grid reference: TQ643752
- Platforms: 5

Other information
- Status: Disused

History
- Original company: London, Tilbury and Southend Railway
- Pre-grouping: Midland Railway
- Post-grouping: London, Midland and Scottish Railway; Eastern Region of British Railways; Network SouthEast

Key dates
- 13 April 1854: Opened as Tilbury
- 3 August 1934: Renamed Tilbury Riverside
- 30 November 1992: Closed
Location

Tilbury Riverside was a railway station that served the town of Tilbury, in Essex, England. It was located south of a triangular junction on the railway between Tilbury Town station and East Tilbury, 22 miles 46 chains (36.3 km) down the line from London Fenchurch Street, via Rainham.

== History ==
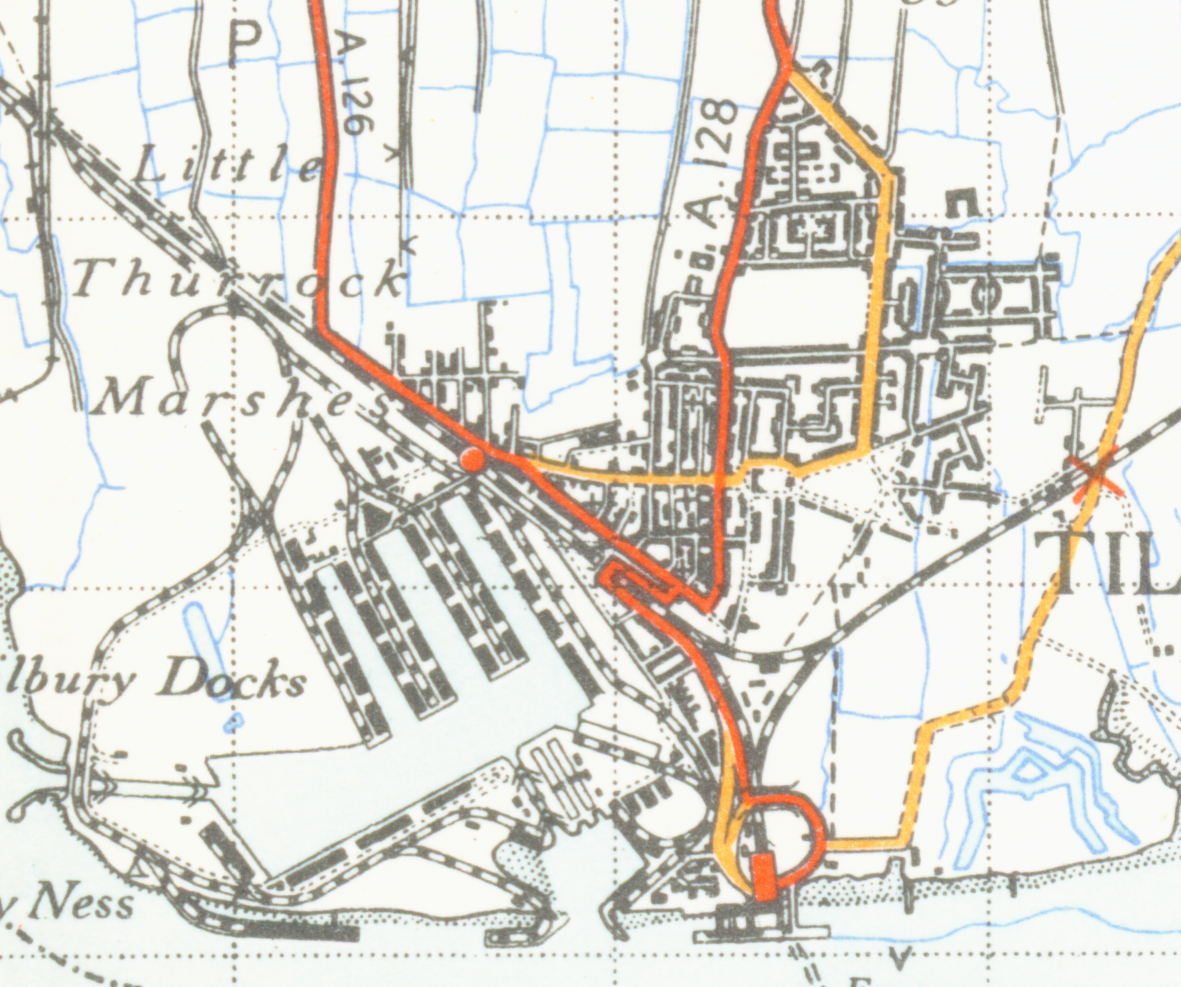
A 1946 Ordnance Survey map showing the station, Tilbury Town and the triangular junction

=== London, Tilbury and Southend Railway (1854-1912) ===
==== Opening ====
The London, Tilbury and Southend Railway (LT&SR) commenced operation of services from London's Bishopsgate and Fenchurch Street stations to Tilbury, (Note: As the station was then known.) via Stratford, Barking and Dagenham Dock on 11 April 1854. The station was perched on the north bank of the Thames and a pontoon was built to serve ferries to Gravesend located on the south bank. The directors felt that commuter traffic from Kent could benefit from a direct link to the city at Fenchurch Street. It is worth noting that Tilbury Docks did not exist at the time and the area was mostly marshland, although it was adjacent to Tilbury Fort. It was hoped that the pontoon and direct rail link would attract steamers.

The lines east to Stanford-le-Hope and the south-to-east curve both opened on 14 August 1854. During 1854 through to 1856, the line from Tilbury was extended in stages to Southend Central, finally opening on 1 March 1856. To avoid changing locomotives, any Fenchurch Street-Southend trains that called at Tilbury had to reverse out of the station to the East Junction, where the lines split, and then recommence their journey. Trains from Southend did the same using the western curve.

The line to London was plagued by delays and the LTSR operated over another company's track in the congested Stratford area. A new line was constructed west of Barking that joined the Fenchurch Street line at Gasworks Junction and this opened on 31 March 1858, cutting journey times between Tilbury and London.

==== Description of first station area ====
The 1854 station was largely constructed of wood, because of the marshy ground, and had four platforms measuring 440 feet (130 m) in length. These were covered by a train shed at the south end of the structure, measuring 55 by 195 feet (17 by 59 m). A station master's house was located on the west side of the station and a goods siding on the east. It was located on the Thames riverbank and a pontoon was constructed, linked by a bridge that rose and fell with the tide.

North of the platforms, where the line split, a two-road timber-built engine shed was established, which had a small turntable; there was also a carriage cleaning shed. In the land within the three railway tracks, the LT&SR constructed two rows of houses (with a third added later), a school and a small gas works.

Tilbury East and West Junctions were both controlled by signalling platforms, (Note: These were early signal boxes.) whilst the station area was controlled by pointsmen who manually set the points on the ground.

About a mile to the west, the first railway-served dock wharf was opened c.1874 and was constructed by a firm called Benson and Coxon. The wharf was used to import coal and the line was joined on the west side of Tilbury station, near the junction. This was not successful and the wharf was closed when construction of the docks started in 1882.

In 1875, Arthur Stride was appointed general manager of the LT&SR and put a stop to the reversing of Southend trains around the triangular junctions. On arrival from Fenchurch Street, a second locomotive would now back onto the carriages and work forward via the south to east curve. Similarly trains from Southend worked in on the east curve; a locomotive was attached in the station and departed on the west curve. In both cases, the arriving locomotive would be available for a later train.

==== 1881-1885 improvements ====
The main improvement was the provision of vehicle access to the pontoon, which improved vehicle and livestock handling. The platform canopies were extended along the platforms and the waiting rooms located on the pontoons were improved. A number of offices and a refreshment rooms were built on the west side.

These changes were all carried out before the official opening of the new Tilbury Docks on 17 April 1886; the dignitaries arrived and toured around much of the docks by train. The large 110-bedroom Tilbury Hotel had been built just west of Riverside station and this hosted the ceremonial luncheon for the docks opening.

==== 1905-1907 rebuilding ====
The station underwent a major rebuild, commencing in 1905. The original buildings were, by now, in a poor state and the entire station was rebuilt, with the exception of the pontoon on the river (Note: This had been upgraded in 1889 and again in 1894.) and the link to the station. The tracks were completely relaid and the first engine shed closed. All three signal boxes were replaced; a road under the station buildings was completed and opened on 23 December 1905.

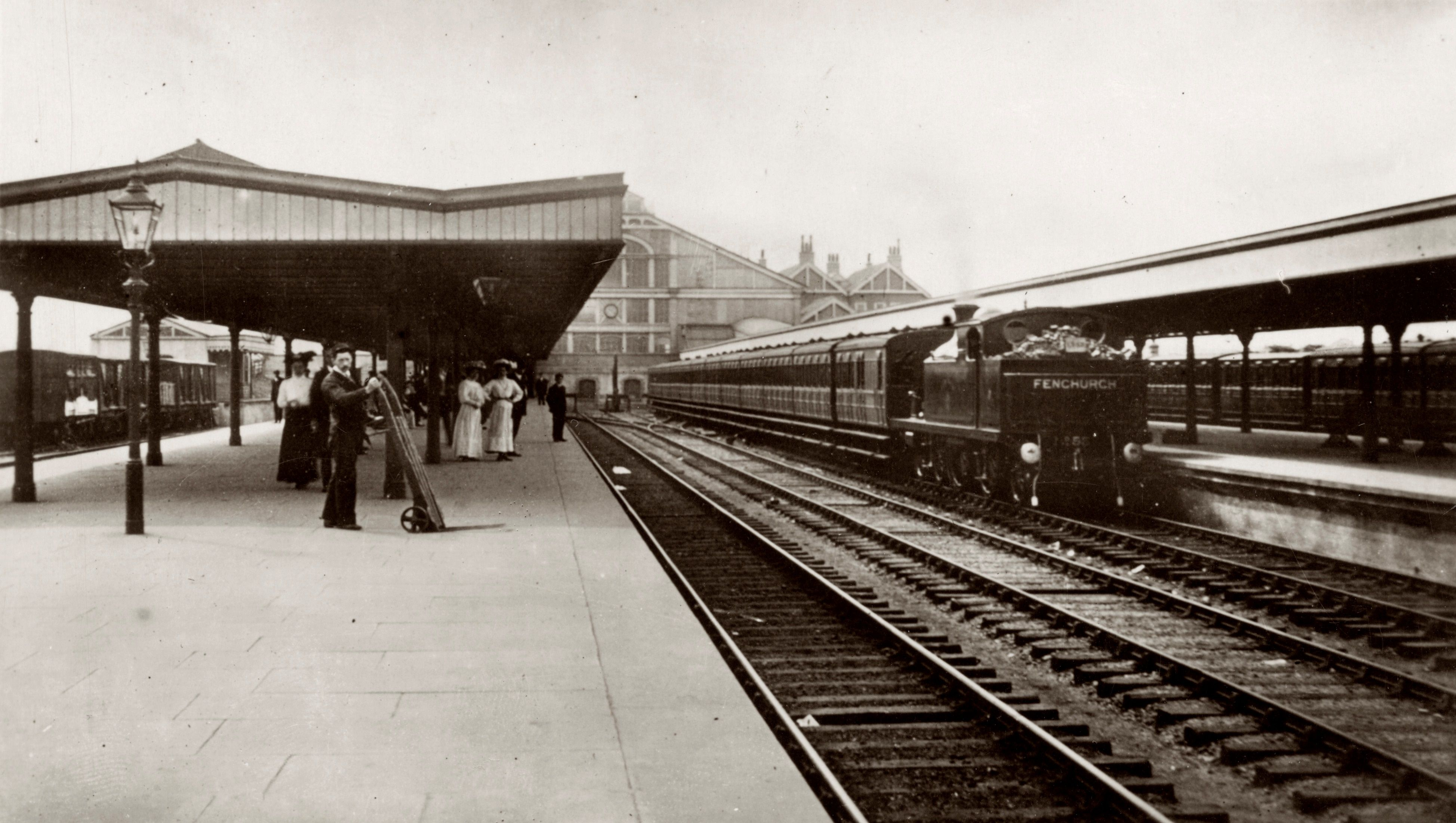
The station in 1912

The new engine shed was opened in 1906 and was located adjacent to the north edge of the triangular junction, which was located on the site of the closed gas works.

In 1909, Tilbury Docks, along with the upstream docks, became part of the newly established Port of London Authority (PLA).

The Midland Railway took over the LTSR on 7 August 1912 and Tilbury station moved under its ownership.

=== London Midland and Scottish (1923-1947) ===
After the Railways Act 1921 was implemented, the LMS became responsible for the operation of the station on 1 January 1923.

After the end of World War I, the Midland and PLA started planning for the expansion of the facilities at Riverside; the aim of the PLA was that the pontoon could deal with two liners at once. The PLA would deal with the shipping facilities, which included a new baggage hall built on the west side of the station; the LMS would pay for the railway facilities, which would include additional platforms at the station, additional carriage sidings on the east side of the junction and improved facilities in the buildings. There was also a plan to extend the tracks southwards, reducing the walk to the pontoon. The station building and the road under the station was to be rebuilt.

As the costs rose, the PLA got cold feet and the size of the pontoon was scaled back, forcing the LMS to scale back its own plans; the circulating area was reduced and the existing platform tracks extended for a short distance. The station buildings and baggage hall, designed by Sir Edwin Cooper, were rebuilt and carriage stabling was reorganised, with some additional sidings and cleaning platforms being provided.

The works were substantially completed and prime minister Ramsay MacDonald was guest of honour at the opening ceremony on 16 May 1930. Other than minor changes for the line's electrification in the late 1950s, the station buildings remained unchanged.

At the request of Tilbury Local Council, both Tilbury Dock and Tilbury stations were renamed; the former became Tilbury Town, to reflect its proximity to the town centre, and the latter became Tilbury Riverside on 3 August 1934.

During World War II, Tilbury escaped the large scale bombing suffered by the London Docks; it was used extensively by the military for repurposing and repairing ships. The site was used extensively in the run up to Operation Overlord; concrete sections for the Mulberry Harbour and the Pipe Line under the ocean (PLUTO) were manufactured here. This led to an increase in personnel using both Tilbury stations.

The Tilbury Hotel burned down after incendiary bombs hit it on 4 February 1944; there was one casualty and one of the three rows of houses located within the triangular junction was reduced to rubble.

There was a return to more commercial traffic in 1947, including handling a significant number of emigrant passengers bound for Australia, known as the Ten Pound Poms, from this time into the 1950s.

=== Nationalisation and closure (1948-1992) ===
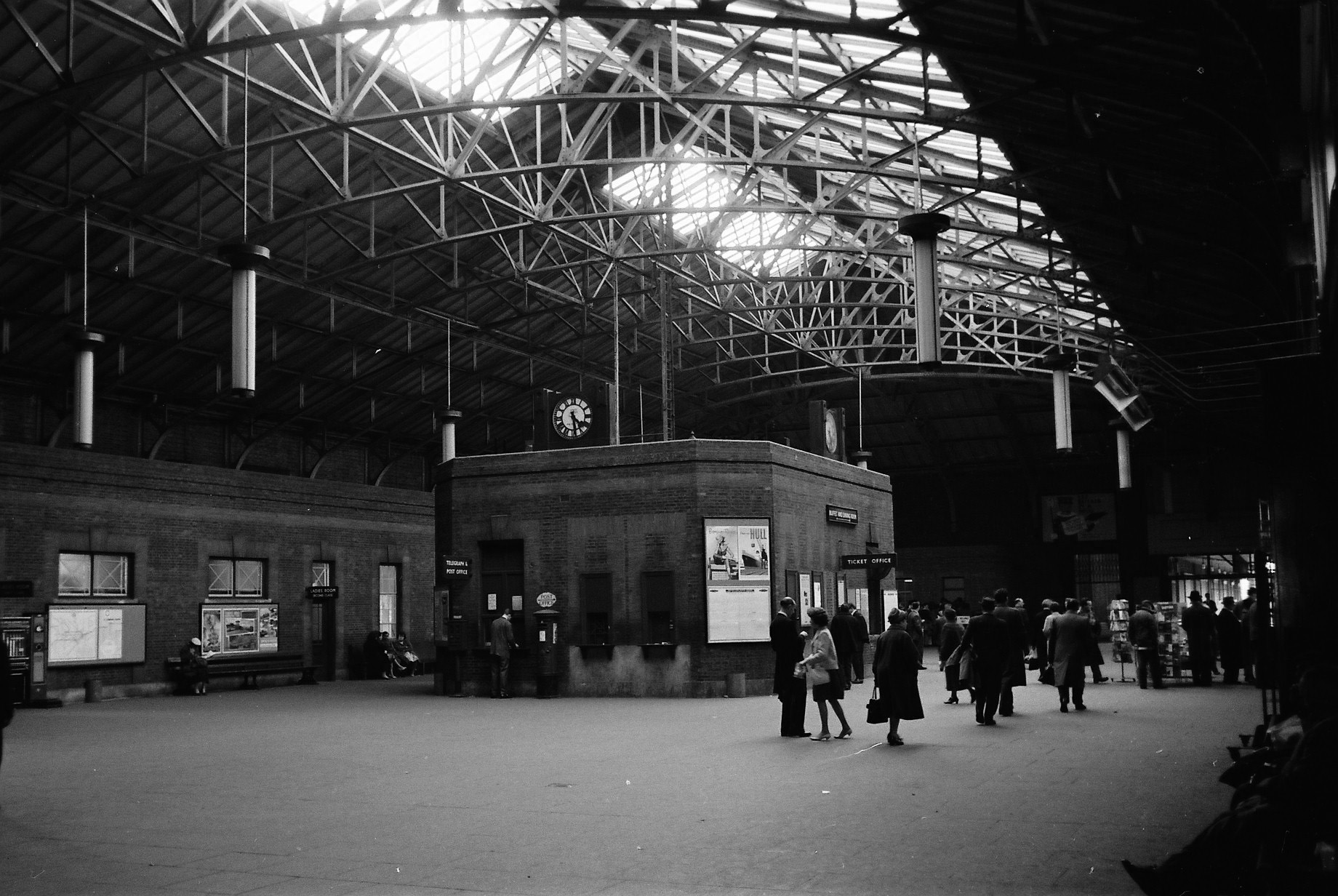
The station in 1961

Following nationalisation of Britain's railways in 1948, the station transferred to British Railways' London Midland Region. On 20 February 1949, the whole LTS line was transferred to the Eastern Region; despite the organisational changes, the old LTSR still was a distinctive system operated by former LTS and LMS locomotives until electrification.

On 22 June 1948, the HMT Empire Windrush arrived at Tilbury Riverside carrying nearly 500 West Indian immigrants. The event is commemorated by a plaque in the former baggage hall (now London Cruise Terminal); it is seen as a key moment in the immigration history of the UK.

The area was resignalled and electrified using the 25kV overhead line system between 1959 and 1961. A depot was built in 1957, to the east of the station, to support the electrification project; it was closed upon completion in June 1964. Tilbury engine shed was closed in June 1964.

Services were withdrawn from the goods yard on 6 May 1968, although some cement traffic remained until the late 1980s. The remaining two rows of houses within the triangular junction were demolished c1970.

Most trains from Fenchurch Street via Tilbury Town would reverse at this station and continue to Westcliff and Benfleet, with a few to/from Fenchurch Street starting or ending here; there were also a few services operating short to or from Upminster. However, in 1986, London trains ceased calling here and the services were shortened to operate only from Upminster to Tilbury Riverside, East Tilbury and Stanford-le-Hope.

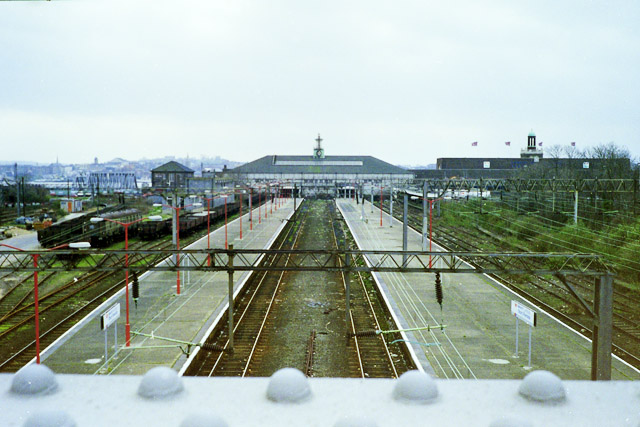
Tilbury Riverside station in early 1990

On 30 November 1992, the station was closed. For many years prior to closure, the station was served only by certain trains on the local service from Upminster via Grays, because the nearby Dartford Crossing and increased car ownership had caused a decline in its importance as a passenger ferry terminal. There was some opposition to closure, but British Rail cited financial reasons for the closure; the annual cost of running the service was put at £180,000, against an income of £11,000.

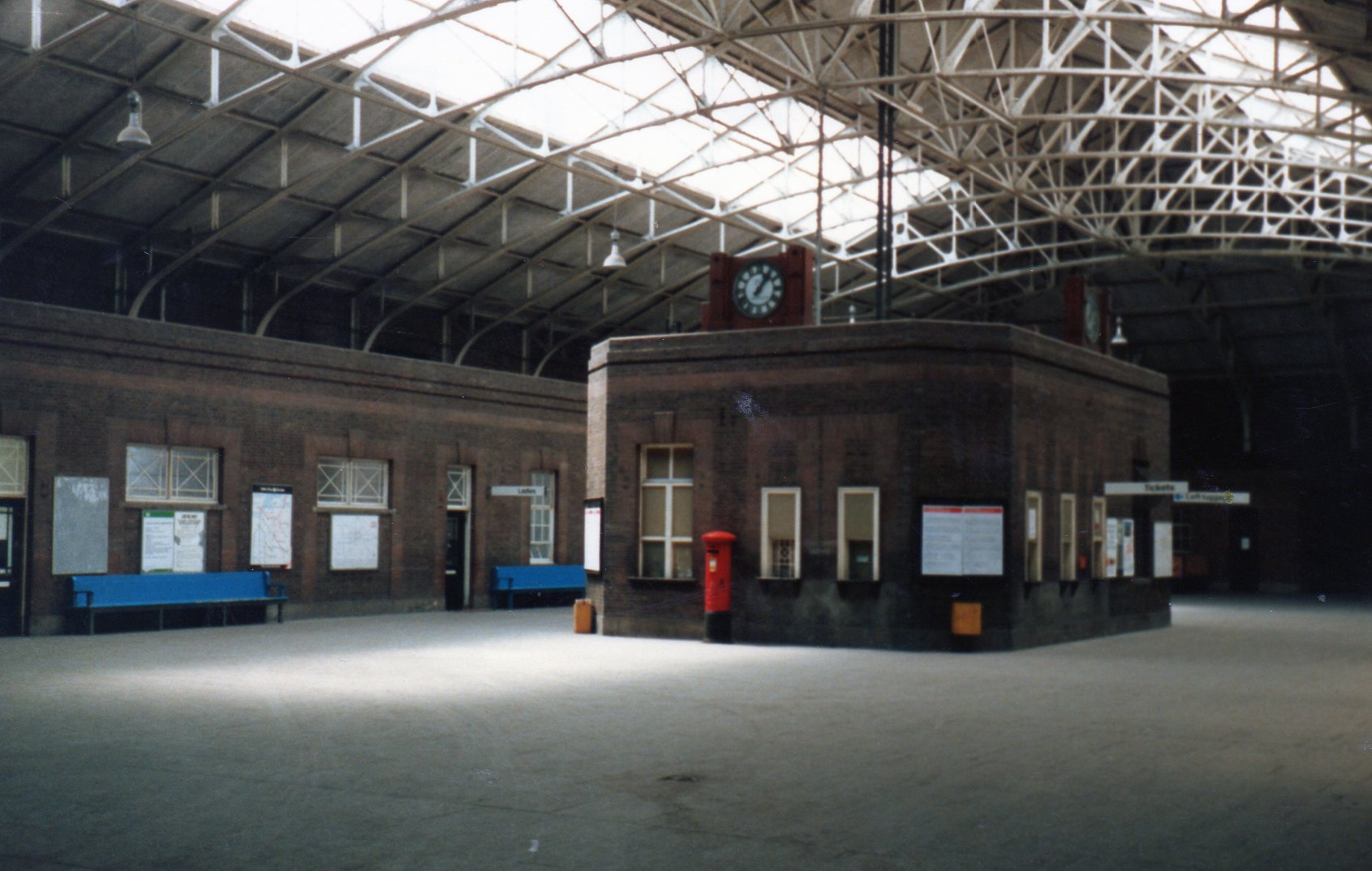
The large and empty circulating area on 5 June 1986

The station building can now be reached by a shuttle bus service from Tilbury Town, which was a requirement of the line closure. Conditions placed include that the bus service is at least as frequent as the train service was at closure, and also that any withdrawal of the bus service go through the same process as closure of the railway service.

The station building is now an indoor car park for the London International Cruise Terminal, which itself occupies the former baggage hall. The land north of the station was cleared after closure.

=== Other railway facilities ===
==== Tilbury engine shed ====
The rebuilding of the station in 1905 also saw the relocation of the engine shed, to deal with goods traffic from the expanded docks that generally operated via Tilbury Dock station.

The shed's allocation in 1912 comprised 16 LT&SR 4-4-2T engines, which worked both goods and passenger services. In LMS and British Railways days, goods engines were also allocated here. During World War II, an armoured train was based at the shed.

The engine shed was rebuilt in 1955-56, as the original shed had deteriorated significantly, being built cheaply of corrugated iron. The new structure was built of corrugated asbestos.

Later in its life, a good number of the LT&S lines passenger engines were kept at Tilbury, due to a shortage of locomotive crews at Plaistow.

The engine shed was closed in June 1964 and was demolished shortly afterwards.

==== Signal boxes ====
In the early years, there were signalling platforms at East and West Junction, but Riverside itself remained worked by pointsmen until the provision of a signal box there in 1877.

Tilbury East Junction signalling platform was supplemented by a signal box in 1870. Tilbury West signalling platform was replaced by a new signal box in 1886, when the line to the Tidal Basin opened.

The 1906 rebuilding of Tilbury Riverside and relocation of the engine shed saw three new signal boxes provided and these were:

- Tilbury South Junction (opened 27 July 1906)
- Tilbury East Junction (opened 16 December 1906)
- Tilbury West Junction (opened 16 December 1906).

In advance of its electrification, the area was resignalled to modern multi-aspect signalling. The three 1906 boxes were closed on 23 September 1961 and control of the area was moved to a new signal box located at Tilbury Riverside.

Although Riverside station was closed in November 1992, the signal box still controlled the main line; this was eventually closed in 4 April 1996, with control transferred to the signalling centre at Upminster.

=== Tilbury2 freightliner terminal ===
A new branch serving a new intermodal terminal was built diverging at the site of East Junction (Note: In the Network Rail Anglia sectional appendix (December 2024), the junction is not named and is shown as close to the site of the former Tilbury West Junction.) and was built through the former engine shed site. This branch parallels the main line towards Pitsea and, after 1.1 miles (1.8 km), the line diverges south to the terminal on the Thames riverbank. The first train serving the terminal ran on 28 November 2020.

The terminal was built on the site of the rail-served Tilbury A and B power stations, the last of which was demolished in 2019.

=== Boat train operation ===
Boat trains to Tilbury's Docks, Riverside, Tidal Basin and Marine stations operated from Fenchurch Street, Liverpool Street and St Pancras.

Most of the berths at Tilbury Docks were supplied with platforms, but Tidal Basin was defined as a station and had two platforms. It was located west of Tilbury Riverside and accessed off the west side of the throat. The station opened on 17 April 1886 and the idea was that ships would tie up here rather than mid-river, allowing a more convenient transfer for passengers. The station was not particularly well used and, in the 1906 remodelling of Riverside, the branch was reduced to a goods siding.

The station was revived under the name Tilbury Marine, when the LMS started a Tilbury to Dunkirk service. The first train ran on 15 May 1927 and the service offered one through train from London to Dunkirk each way, with connecting coaches to Manchester and Bradford. Traffic was reasonable in the summer, but poor in the winter; it was decided to withdraw the service, with the last train running on 30 April 1932 and Tilbury Marine closed the following day. It opened on 15 May 1927 and closed on 1 May 1932. The station suffered bomb damage in World War II, but was still largely intact in 1947.

Boat trains ran to the various transit sheds within the dock complex and these were routed into the docks area by the link near to Tilbury Town station. They were initially worked by PLA locomotives within the dock areas, although main line locomotives were permitted after World War I.

However, the majority of boat trains worked to Tilbury Riverside and, as well as traffic for liners, there were pleasure cruises and the ferry services to Gravesend. In 1933, there was 635 boat trains and similar numbers ran in the 1950s. The business tailed off drastically after that and the last recorded boat train from St Pancras was in 1963.

Boat trains continued from Fenchurch Street and were formed of Class 302 electric multiple units (EMUs), a number of which had increased baggage van space for these services. Some boat trains, using both diesel-hauled and EMUs, continued to work to/from Liverpool Street, but these ceased when P&O pulled out of Tilbury in 1970. By now, any trains were for cruise ships and occasional workings were run every two to three weeks up to the closure of Riverside station.

== Services ==
Early services were operated by former Eastern Counties Railway locomotives and by those of the Great Eastern Railway from 1862. From 1880, the LTSR started to introduce its own classes of 4-4-2T locomotives, which took over London passenger workings; these included the 1 class, 37 class, 49 class, 51 class, 69 class and 79 class. After 1912, further LTSR designs were ordered by the Midland Railway. (Note: A full history of the operation of the line up to 1912 can be found in the London Tilbury and Southend Railway article.)

LMS 3-Cylindered Stanier 2-6-4T locomotives took over in the early 1930s, but these were transferred away in 1939 and the 4-4-2Ts returned to front-line passenger operation. The 2-6-4Ts returned in 1945 and worked through to withdrawal in 1964. After 1948, British Railways introduced the BR Standard Class 4 2-6-4T, which worked through to electrification. A number of diesel-hauled trains and diesel multiple units worked passenger services in the area.

Upon electrification of the route, the large majority of services were operated by Class 302 EMUs. (Note: A full history of the operation of the line after 1912 can be found in the London, Tilbury and Southend Line article.)

Preceding station	Disused railways	Following station
Tilbury Town	Network SouthEast; London Fenchurch Street-Shoeburyness	East Tilbury or Terminus

== See also ==
- Port of Tilbury
- Gravesend–Tilbury Ferry
- London, Tilbury and Southend Railway - history until 1912
- London, Tilbury and Southend Line - history after 1912.
