= LT&SR 49 Class =

LT&SR 49 class
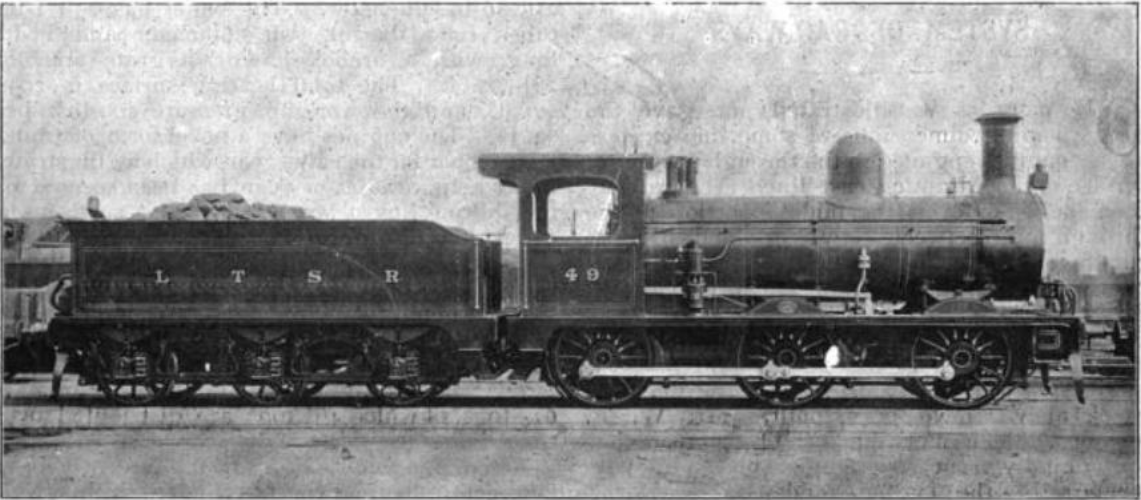
- No. 49 as delivered in 1899, before cab modification
Type and origin
- Power type: Steam
- Build date: 1898
- Total produced: 2
Specifications
- Configuration
  - Whyte: 0-6-0
  - UIC: C n2
- Gauge: 4 ft 8 1/2 in (1,435 mm)
- Driver dia.: 4 ft 6 1/2 in (1.384 m)
- Loco weight: 38.20 long tons (38.81 t)
- Boiler pressure: 150 psi (1.03 MPa)
- Cylinders: Two
- Cylinder size: 18 in × 24 in (460 mm × 610 mm)
- Valve gear: Stephenson
Performance figures
- Tractive effort: 18,026 lbf (80.2 kN)
Career
- Operators: London, Tilbury and Southend Railway; Midland Railway; London, Midland and Scottish Railway
- Class: LT&SR: 49
- Power class: MR/LMS: 2F
- Numbers: LTSR: 49–50; MR: 2898–2899
- Withdrawn: 1933, 1936
- Disposition: Both scrapped

The LT&SR 49 class was a class of 0-6-0 steam locomotives. They were the only tender engines used by the London, Tilbury and Southend Railway. They were originally ordered by the Ottoman Railway in Turkey, however that order was cancelled after they had been built and instead they were sold to the LT&SR in 1898. The LT&SR numbered them 49 and 50. They were built with large cabs having a long opening in each side; soon after delivery to the LT&SR, these openings were filled in, and a smaller glazed opening window provided instead.

Both passed to the Midland Railway when it merged the LT&SR in 1912. The Midland renumbered them 2898–2899 and gave them the power classification 2F. The Midland fitted them with Belpaire firebox boilers, plus some standard fittings. Both passed into LMS ownership in 1923, and they initially retained their numbers.

In 1935, number 2899 was renumbered with the addition of 20000 to 22899; 2898 having been withdrawn in 1933. Number 22899 was withdrawn in 1936. Neither was preserved.
