= LT&SR 51 Class =

Class of British steam locomotives

LT&SR 51 class
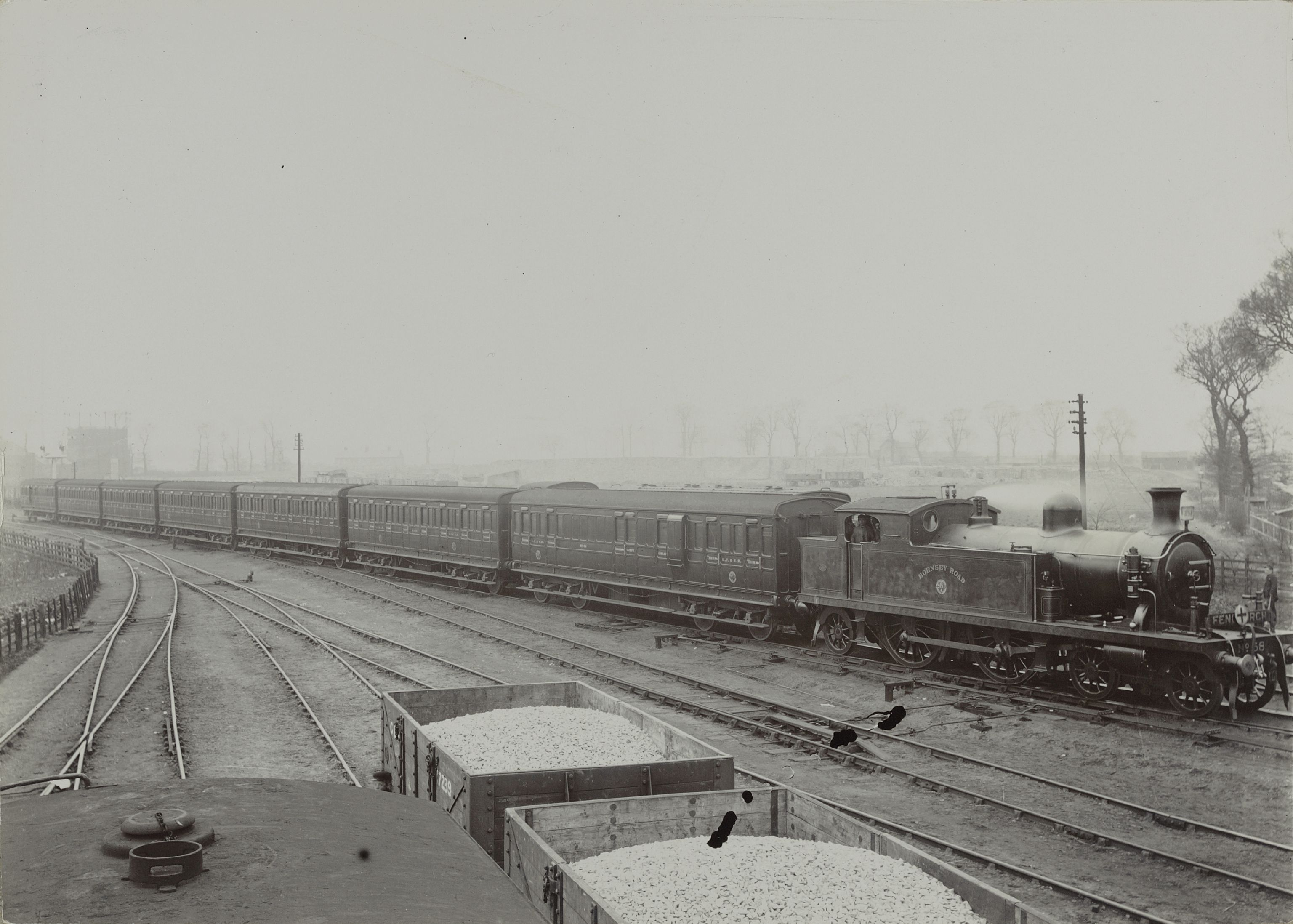
Type and origin
- Power type: Steam
- Designer: Thomas Whitelegg
- Builder: Sharp, Stewart & Co. (12); North British Locomotive Co. (6)
- Build date: 1900 (12), 1903 (6)
- Total produced: 18
Specifications
- Configuration
  - Whyte: 4-4-2T
  - UIC: 2′B1 n2t
- Gauge: 4 ft 8 1/2 in (1,435 mm)
- Driver dia.: 6 ft 6 in (1.981 m)
- Loco weight: 67.80 long tons (68.89 t)
- Fuel type: Coal
- Boiler pressure: 170 psi (1.2 MPa)
- Cylinders: Two
- Cylinder size: 18 in × 26 in (457 mm × 660 mm) or 19 in × 26 in (483 mm × 660 mm)
- Valve gear: Stephenson
Performance figures
- Tractive effort: 15,606–17,388 lbf (69.4–77.3 kN)
Career
- Operators: LTSR; MR; LMS; BR
- Power class: MR/LMS/BR: 2P
- Number in class: 1 January 1923: 18; 1 January 1948: 17
- Withdrawn: 1947–1953
- Disposition: All scrapped

The London, Tilbury and Southend Railway 51 class was a class of 4-4-2T steam locomotives. Twelve were built by Sharp, Stewart and Company to the design of Thomas Whitelegg for the London, Tilbury and Southend Railway in 1900, with North British Locomotive Company supplying an additional six in 1903. The LTSR numbered them 51–68, and named them places in London and Essex.

They entered Midland Railway stock in 1912. The Midland gave them the power classification 2P, and renumbered them 2158–2175. They subsequently entered London, Midland and Scottish Railway stock in 1923. They retained their ex-Midland Railway numbers until 1930 when they were renumbered 2092–2109.

Number 2105 was withdrawn in 1947, and the remaining seventeen of these entered British Railways stock in 1948, and were to be renumbered 41910–41926, but only three (41922, 41923 and 41925) survived to carry their new numbers. The last was withdrawn in 1953. None was preserved.

== List of locomotives ==
LTSR No.	LTSR Name	Builder	Built	Midland/LMS 1923 No.	LMS 1930 No.	BR No.	Withdrawn
51	Purfleet	SS 4653	1900	2158	2092	41910	1948
52	Wennington	SS 4654	1900	2159	2093	41911	1953
53	Stepney Green	SS 4655	1900	2160	2094	41912	1949
54	Mile End	SS 4656	1900	2161	2095	41913	1949
55	Bow Road	SS 4657	1900	2162	2096	41914	1950
56	Harringay	SS 4658	1900	2163	2097	41915	1951
57	Crouch Hill	SS 4659	1900	2164	2098	41916	1951
58	Hornsey	SS 4660	1900	2165	2099	41917	1951
59	Holloway	SS 4661	1900	2166	2100	41918	1949
60	Highgate	SS 4662	1900	2167	2101	41919	1951
61	Kentish Town	SS 4663	1900	2168	2102	41920	1953
62	Camden	SS 4664	1900	2169	2103	41921	1951
63	Mansion House	NBL 15744	1903	2170	2104	41922	1953
64	Charing Cross	NBL 15745	1903	2171	2105	—	1947
65	Victoria	NBL 15746	1903	2172	2106	41923	1949
66	Earl's Court	NBL 15747	1903	2173	2107	41924	1949
67	Westminster	NBL 15748	1903	2174	2108	41925	1952
68	Mark Lane	NBL 15749	1903	2175	2109	41926	1951
