= Thames Haven railway station =

British railway station

Thames Haven

General information
- Location: Thurrock, Essex; England
- Coordinates: 51.5059°N 0.5082°E
- Platforms: 2 (unavailable to the public)

Other information
- Status: Disused

History
- Original company: Thames Haven Dock & Railway Co.
- Pre-grouping: London, Tilbury and Southend Railway

Key dates
- 7 June 1855: station opened
- 1880: closed to regular passenger service
- 1909: closed completely
- 1923: workmens service began
- 1958: workmens service withdrawn
Location

Thames Haven Railway Station is a freight terminal (formerly a passenger station) on the coast of Essex, England. It is the terminus of the goods-only Thames Haven branch.

== History ==
Thames Haven, Dock and Railway Act 1836
- Act of Parliament
- Parliament of the United Kingdom
- Long title: An Act for making a Railway from or near Romford in the County of Essex to Shell Haven in the same County, and for constructing a Tide Dock at the Termination of the said Railway at Shell Haven aforesaid.
- Citation: 6 & 7 Will. 4. c. cviii

Dates
- Royal assent: 4 July 1836

Other legislation
- Amended by: Thames Haven Dock and Railway Act 1842
- Repealed by: Thames Haven Dock Company's Act 1856

Status: Repealed

Text of statute as originally enacted

Thames Haven Dock and Railway Act 1842
- Act of Parliament
- Parliament of the United Kingdom
- Long title: An Act for extending and enlarging some of the Provisions of an Act relating to the Thames Haven Dock and Railway.
- Citation: 5 & 6 Vict. c. lxxxix

Dates
- Royal assent: 30 June 1842

Other legislation
- Amends: Thames Haven, Dock and Railway Act 1836
- Repealed by: Thames Haven Dock Company's Act 1856

Status: Repealed

Text of statute as originally enacted

The Thames Haven Railway Company was incorporated by the Thames Haven, Dock and Railway Act 1836 (6 & 7 Will. 4. c. cviii) to build a railway from Romford to Shell Haven, which was then a lobster fishing village. The powers for construction were renewed in 1846, though in 1853, the scheme to Romford was abandoned in favour of a single, 4-mile (6.4 km) branch, which was to run from a junction with Tilbury-Pitsea line to a new port to be called Thames Haven. After this, the branch was to be transferred to the London, Tilbury and Southend Railway for £48,000. It was intended to develop Thames Haven as a continental port for fish and cattle, as well as passengers, though this ambitious plan proved hard to realise owing to political instability in Europe in 1870, and then a ban on the importation of foreign cattle due to disease concerns. The passenger service from Fenchurch Street ended in 1880. By the 1890s, the branch saw just one train a day. Occasional passenger trains ran until 1909. A new service for workers from Tilbury and East Tilbury to Thames Haven began on 1 January 1923, which lasted until 9 June 1958, there were four intermediate halts at Mayes Crossing, Curry Marsh, London & Thames Haven Oil Wharves and Thames Haven.

== Corringham Light Railway ==
The Corringham Light Railway, authorised in 1899, connected to the Thames Haven branch on its opening in 1901. It was initially intended to enter into an agreement with the LT&SR to run passenger trains onto the CLR, either by changing at a new platform or reversing at Thames Haven station. Even though the Thames Haven line had been re-signalled in 1889 to passenger standards, the passenger service was never re-instated after withdrawal in 1880- although one special did run over the branch in 1903, with the passengers changing at the old Thames Haven island platform. During the First World War, with the explosives factory at Kynochtown, some workers appealed for through-trains to Thames Haven from London, as problems had arisen with the motor transport which carried workers from Stanford-le-Hope to Corringham station. This request was never granted. Passenger service on the line was withdrawn in 1952 and parts of the line were absorbed into the Thames Haven complex in 1971.

Although no regular passenger trains ran after 1880, the station building was still standing in 1938.

== Thames Haven branch freight operations ==
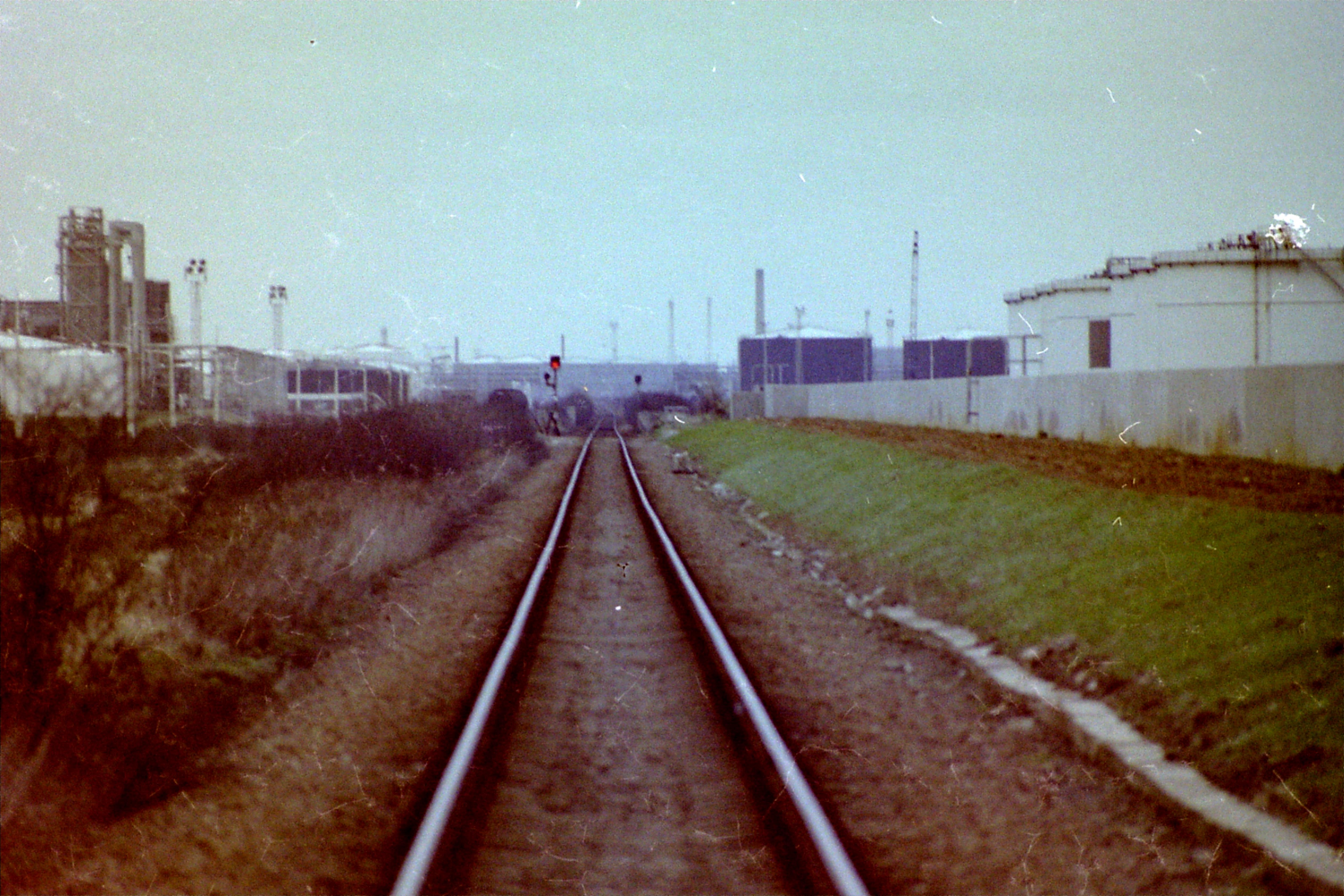
Thames Haven Branch looking East 1981

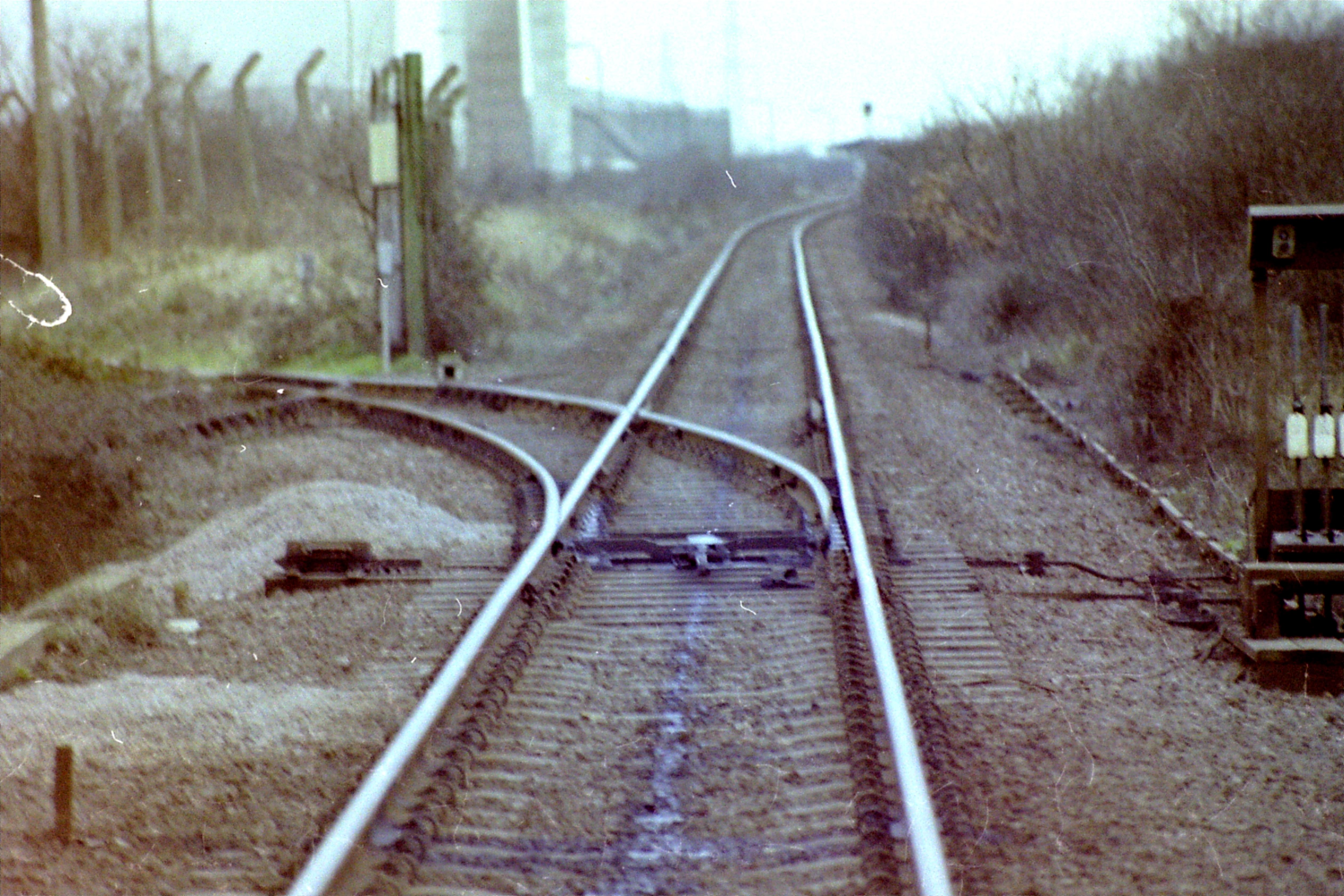
Thames Haven Branch looking West 1981

The principal use of the Thames Haven Branch (Engineer's Line Reference THN) is for freight. The branch formerly served the Shell Haven refinery and the Coryton oil refinery transporting petroleum products from the refineries in rail tank wagons. Liquefied ammonia was also transported from the Shell Haven site, and to the Fisons Ltd works at Stanford-le-Hope for the manufacture of nitric acid and ammonium nitrate fertiliser (since closed). The export of ammonia from Shell Haven ceased in 1980, Shell Haven refinery closed in 1999, and Coryton refinery closed in 2012. The branch formerly had a siding, at 28 miles 9 chains (45.24 km) from the datum, used by British Dredging, this was out of use by 1997.

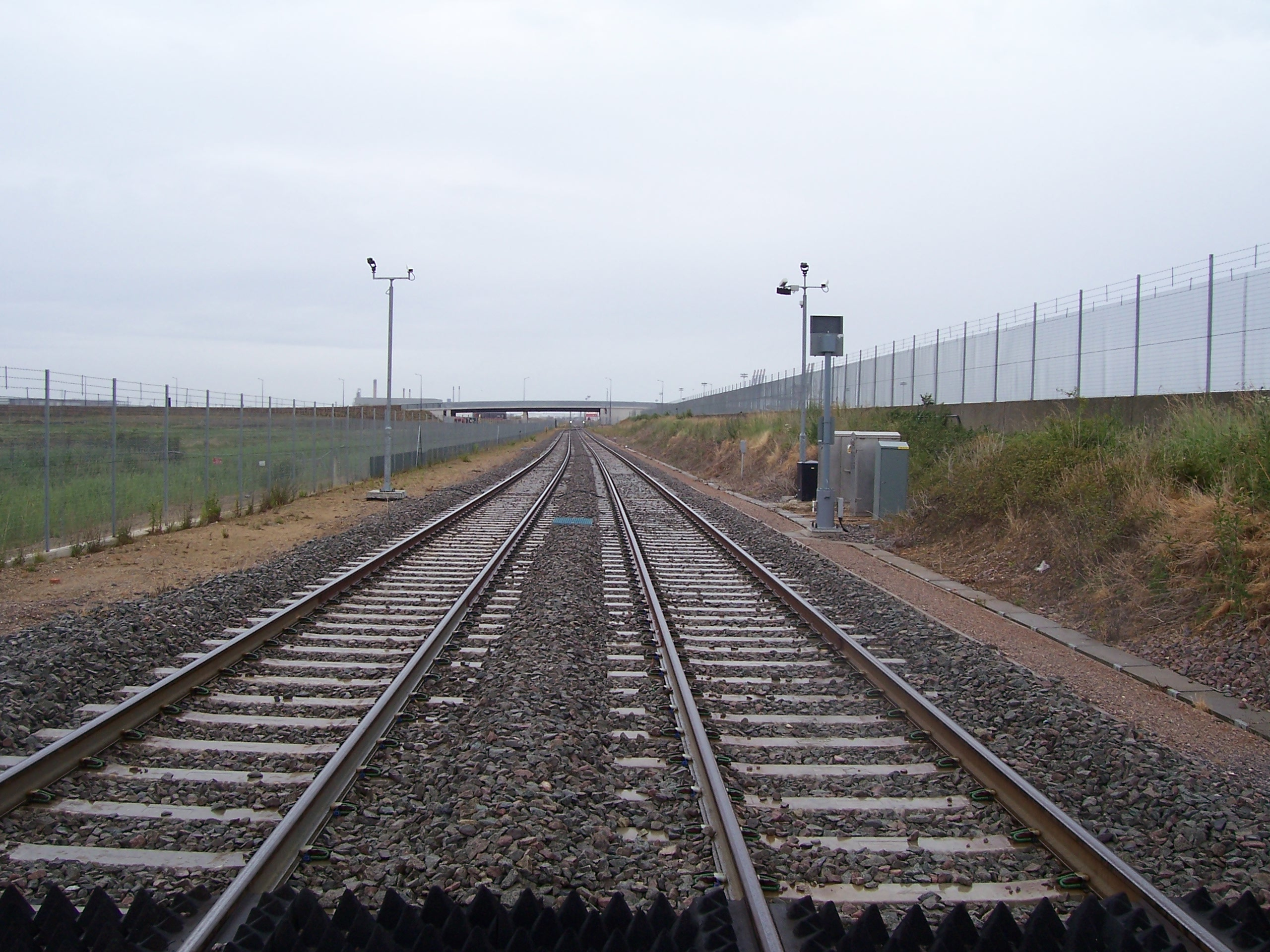
Thames Haven Branch, looking East towards London Gateway, 28 June 2015

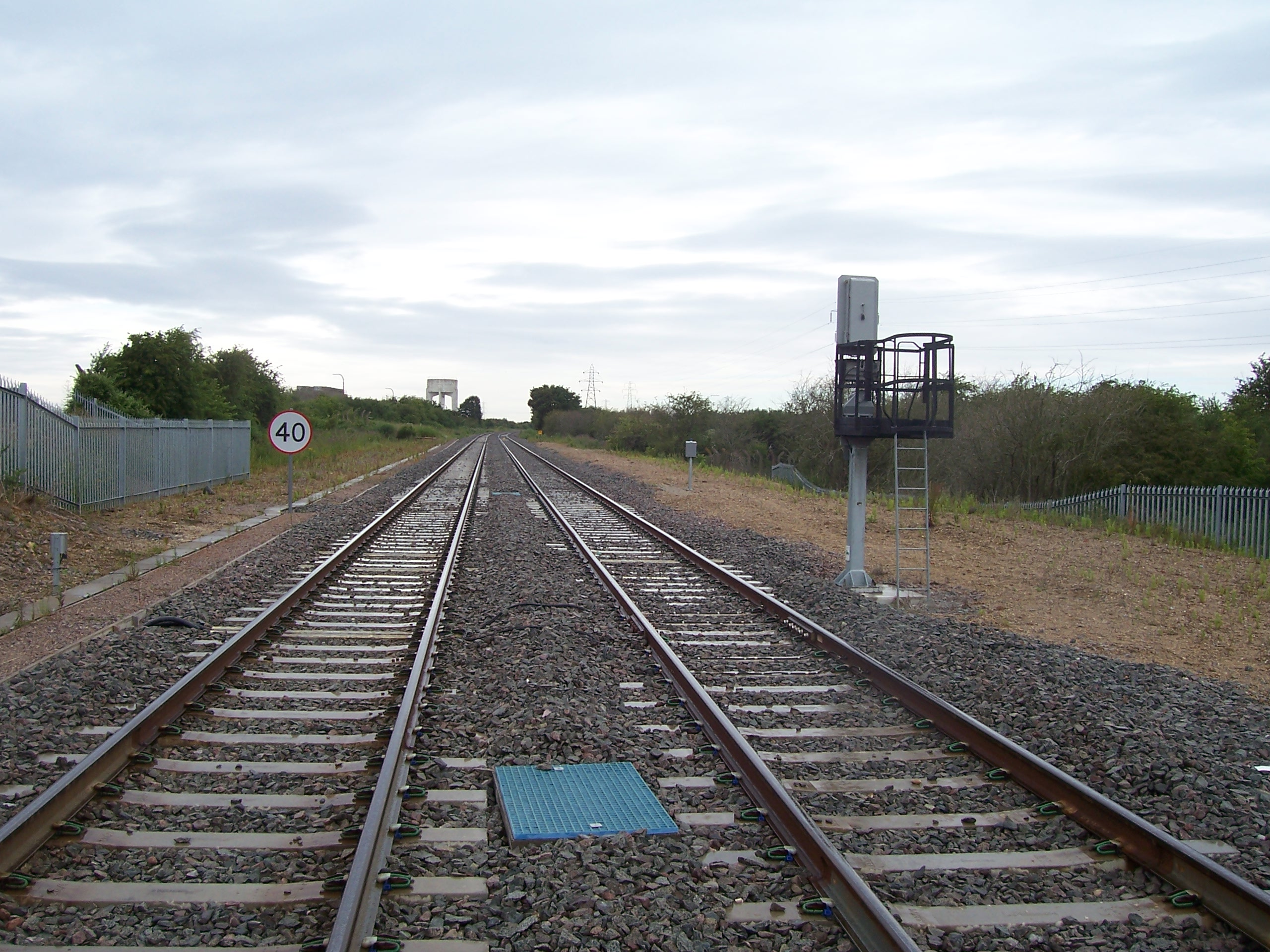
Thames Haven Branch, looking West towards Thames Haven Junction, 28 June 2015

The branch is connected to the national rail system at Thames Haven Junction between East Tilbury and Stanford-le-Hope stations 26 miles 41 chains (42.67 km) from a datum at London Fenchurch Street. The western end of the branch is a two track line designated Down Thames Haven and Up Thames Haven running nearly 2 miles to Port Junction located at 28 miles 33 chains (45.73 km) from the datum. The boundary between Network Rail infrastructure and DP World is at the former British Dredging siding at 28 miles 9 chains (45.24 km). From Port Junction the branch splits into 3 lines:

- the most northerly line designated the Thames Haven Single runs to terminus junction at 30 miles 13 chains (48.54 km) where the line connects to the former Coryton and Corringham lines. From terminus junction the line branches north and east to the currently out of use Thames Oilport (formerly Coryton refinery), and directly to the east to the "not in regular use" Thames Haven Yard
- the next line to the south is designated Port Arrivals
- the most southerly line is Port Departures, both these lines connect to the currently six loading sidings of the London Gateway port. Railway operations at the port from the Network Rail boundary are controlled by the London Gateway Rail Control Centre located at the eastern end of the sidings.

The branch is not electrified and is only accessible by diesel locomotives, it has a route availability of 8, that is limited to an axle load of ≤22.8 tonne. There are currently (2017) nine freight paths to, and nine paths available from, London Gateway every weekday.

== Bibliography ==
- Gotherdige, I (1986). The Corrginham Light Railway. Oakwood Press. ISBN 9780853613114.
- Jones, Robin (2008). Lost Railways of Essex. Countryside Books. ISBN 978-1-84674-111-1.
- Kay, Peter (2008). The Corringham Light Railway, A New History. ISBN 978-1899890422.
- Scott, Winifred N (1981). Coryton: The history of a village. Mobil. ISBN 978-0950793412.
