= East Tilbury railway station =

Railway station in Essex, England

Coordinates: 51.485°N 0.413°E

East Tilbury
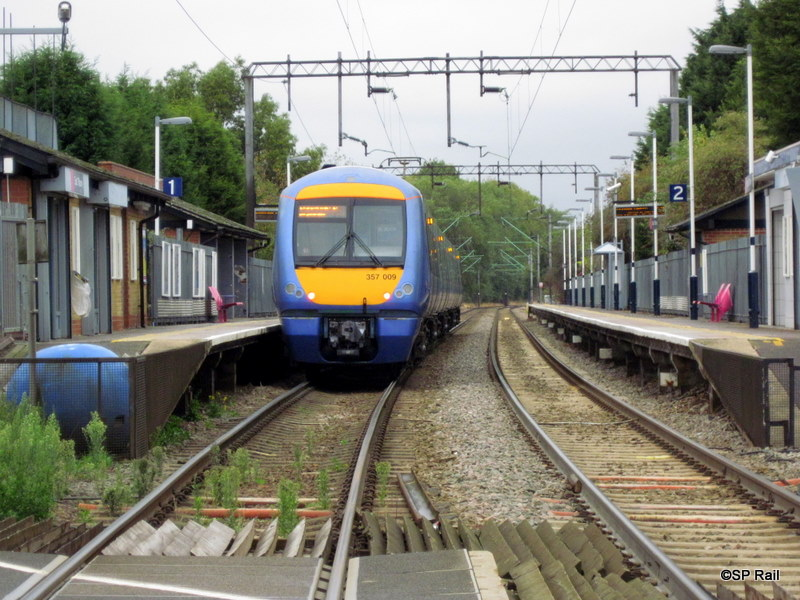

General information
- Location: East Tilbury, Borough of Thurrock; England
- Grid reference: TQ676789
- Manager: c2c
- Platforms: 2

Other information
- Station code: ETL
- Classification: DfT category E

History
- Opened: 1936

Passengers
- 2020/21: ▼0.149 million
- 2021/22: ▲0.276 million
- 2022/23: ▲0.286 million
- 2023/24: ▲0.329 million
- 2024/25: ▲0.385 million
Location
Notes
- Passenger statistics from the Office of Rail and Road

East Tilbury railway station is on a loop line of the London, Tilbury and Southend line, serving the village of East Tilbury, Essex. It is 25 miles 7 chains (40.4 km) down the line from London Fenchurch Street via Rainham and it is situated between Tilbury Town and Stanford-le-Hope. Its three-letter station code is ETL. The station and all trains serving it are operated by c2c.

== History ==
It was opened on 7 September 1936 as a halt station intended to serve workers at the nearby Bata Shoe Company, which paid for the construction of the platforms. Initially, trains only stopped in rush hour. The halt was upgraded to full station status in January 1949. Increasing patronage at East Tilbury led to the closure in 1967 of Low Street, a minor station close by.

Private operation of the London, Tilbury and Southend line by Trenitalia c2c ceased on 20 July 2025, with the new publicly owned operator c2c taking over.

== Location ==
East Tilbury is on a link known as the Tilbury Loop, which joins the main line at the London end at Barking and at the country end at Pitsea.

It is located close to Coalhouse Fort, an artillery fort dating from the 1860s.

== Services ==
As of the June 2024 timetable the typical Monday to Friday off-peak service is:

- 2 tph (trains per hour) westbound to London Fenchurch Street via Ockendon
- 2 tph eastbound to Southend Central

Preceding station	National Rail	Following station
Tilbury Town	c2c London, Tilbury and Southend line Tilbury Loop	Stanford-le-Hope
	Disused railways	
Tilbury Riverside	Network SouthEast; London, Tilbury and Southend line	Low Street
