= Stanford-le-Hope railway station =

Railway station in Essex, England

Coordinates: 51.514°N 0.423°E

Stanford-le-Hope
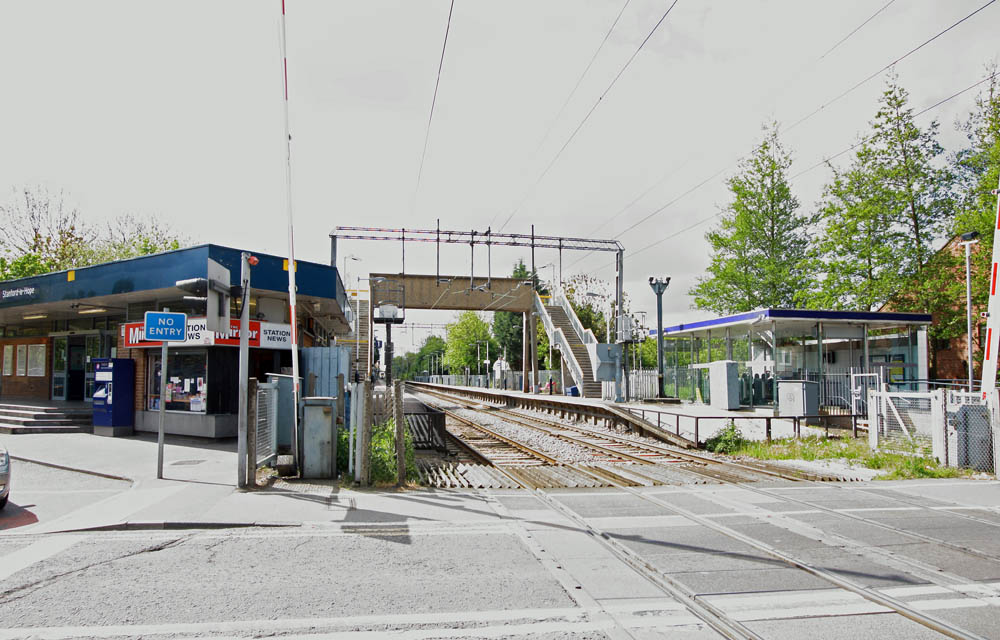

General information
- Location: Stanford-le-Hope, Borough of Thurrock; England
- Grid reference: TQ682822
- Manager: c2c
- Platforms: 2

Other information
- Station code: SFO
- Classification: DfT category D

History
- Opened: 1854

Passengers
- 2020/21: ▼0.263 million
- 2021/22: ▲0.529 million
- 2022/23: ▲0.579 million
- 2023/24: ▲0.610 million
- 2024/25: ▲0.745 million
Location
Notes
- Passenger statistics from the Office of Rail and Road

Stanford-le-Hope railway station is on a loop line of the London, Tilbury and Southend line, serving the town of Stanford-le-Hope, Essex. It is 27 miles 13 chains (43.7 km) down the line from London Fenchurch Street via Rainham and it is situated between East Tilbury and Pitsea. Its three-letter station code is SFO.

The station is on a link known as the Tilbury Loop, which joins the main line at the London end at Barking and at the country end at Pitsea. The station and all trains serving it are operated by c2c.

== History ==
=== Early years (1854–1912) ===
The station was opened by the London, Tilbury and Southend Railway in September 1854 with the name Horndon although the November 1856 Bradshaws timetable shows the station as Stanford-le-Hope.

Trains from London terminated at the station until the next section of railway towards Leigh opened on 1 June 1855. This line was opened as single-track but had no electric telegraph so the line was doubled before opening. The line was further extended to Southend Central and this opened on 1 March 1856.

=== Midland Railway (1912–1922) ===
In 1912 the Midland Railway bought the LT&SR on 7 August 1912 so Stanford-le-Hope became a Midland Railway station.

The up platform (towards Tilbury and London) was destroyed by fire in February 1918 and was entirely rebuilt south of the level crossing. Thus the station had platforms either side of the road. The down platform was extended north towards Pitsea at the same time and ordinary level crossing dates were provided instead.

=== London, Midland & Scottish Railway (1923–1947) ===
Following the Railways Act 1921 the station became the responsibility of the London Midland and Scottish (LMS) Railway from 1 January 1923.

In 1935 the down platform was rebuilt south of the level crossing and opened to traffic on 23 June 1935 of that year.

Just after World War II started in September 1939, the passenger service was reduced as a wartime economy measure.

=== The nationalisation years (1948–1994) ===
Following nationalisation of Britain's railways in 1948, the station transferred under British Railways to the London Midland Region. On 20 February 1949, the whole LTS line was transferred to the Eastern Region, yet despite the organisational changes, the old LTSR still was a distinctive system operated by former LTS and LMS steam locomotives until electrification.

During the late 1950s the LTS was being electrified and re-signalled and a full electric timetable started operating in June 1962 which was primarily worked by Class 302 EMUs.

A footbridge was erected and electric lighting supplied in 1959. This was followed by the provision of a new station building built in the winter of 1961/62.

The LTS line and Stanford-le-Hope station became part of the London and South Eastern sector of British Rail in 1982, and in June 1986 this was rebranded as Network South East (NSE). With the Conservative government of the early 1990s looking to privatise the railways, the operation of the NSE passenger train service was put under the control of a Train Operating Unit.

=== The privatisation years (1994–2025) ===
==== Franchises ====
On privatisation in 1994, infrastructure ownership passed to Railtrack and Prism Rail took over operations of the franchise, marketing the route as LTS Rail. Prism Rail were bought out by National Express in 2000 and in 2002 the line was rebranded as c2c.

Ownership of the infrastructure passed to Network Rail in 2002.

National Express sold the operation of the franchise to Trenitalia in 2017.

The station and all trains serving it are currently operated by c2c and are operated by Class 357 and Class 720/6 EMUs.

A more detailed history of the franchises can be found on the c2c page.

On 20 July 2025 the C2C network was returned to the public sector by the Labour Government

==== Station Building ====
The 1960s station building was demolished in 2020 by Thurrock Council with the intention of building a replacement. Unfortunately local government finances and spiralling costs have led to the delay of a new station building with a cost of £14 million pounds being quoted for its replacement.

In late 2025 the stations building plan is in the 'Infrastructure phase'. A contractor is due to be appointed in February 2026, with the aim from Thurrock Council being to begin construction in August 2026. The design of the station building is currently uncertain.

== Design ==
The original station building and platforms were constructed to the north of the London Road level crossing, In 1880/1 the platforms extended over the level crossing and had movable sections mounted on wheels for opening and closing when a train was due. The platforms and single storey station building were of timber construction.

Today the station is south of the level crossing and is largely built of concrete but no station building. The area of the former station and goods yard site is now the car park.

== Thameshaven Junction ==
32 chains south-west of the station, Thameshaven Junction was the junction for the Thameshaven Branch Line which is now used by intermodal trains serving DP World London Gateway, while principally a deep-water port, is also a rail cargo terminus.

== Operations ==
=== Services ===
In the November 1856 timetable the station was served by four trains per day operating from Fenchurch to Tilbury Riverside where the train reversed and then onto Stanford-le-Hope and terminating at Southend. Similarly four trains operated in the other direction.

The Bradshaws dated December 1895 had nine down and nine up services on Mondays to Saturdays and three each way on Sundays.

The standard off-peak service to Stanford-le-Hope in June 1962 - the first all electric service - was two train in each direction calling all stations to Fenchurch Street (although Low street was only served by ne train) with a reversal at Tilbury Riverside. In the other direction it was all stations to Shoeburyness.

As of the June 2024 timetable the typical Monday to Friday off-peak service is:

- 2 tph (trains per hour) westbound to London Fenchurch Street via Ockendon
- 2 tph eastbound to Southend Central

=== Goods ===
There was a small goods yard north of the station on the up side of the line which served a single storey brick goods shed built of timber. This was replaced by a brick structure in 1881.

This included a brewery store siding which was located behind the up platform. It is possible this was part of the Blyth & Squier brewery who also had a siding and brewery at Grays (Seabrook siding). Their beermats mention a brewery at Stanford-le-Hope but it its not certain whether this was the actual brewery as well.

The exact closure of the goods yard is unknown but the yard was served by the weekday 1.25.a.m. Ripple Lane to Shoeburyness goods in the September 1962 freight working timetable. All local freight services to LTSR minor stations were withdrawn by June 1967.

=== Signalling ===
The first signal box was built at the Pitsea end of the down platform (then north of the level crossing) in 1881. It was opposite the goods yard.

During the 1924 re-signalling of the area, a new Midland Railway style signal box was provided next to the level crossing on the site of the former up platform.

The connections and signals relating to the goods yard were removed in 1970. On 11 November 1984 the level crossing gates were replaced by barriers. The signal box, by then only controlling the level crossing and a few local signals, was closed on 19 May 1985 and the crossing itself operated by CCTV controlled remotely from Pitsea box.

| Preceding station | National Rail | Following station |
|---|---|---|
| East Tilbury | c2c London, Tilbury and Southend line Tilbury Loop | Pitsea |
