= London, Tilbury and Southend Railway =

British railway company

The London, Tilbury and Southend Railway (LT&SR), was a British railway company, whose network connected Fenchurch Street station, in central London, with destinations in east London and Essex, including Barking, Upminster, Grays, Tilbury, Southend and Shoeburyness. The company and its assets were sold to the Midland Railway in 1912. The network over which they operated is largely intact and is currently operated as part of c2c.

== History ==
=== Prior to opening ===
In the mid-18th century south Essex was a thinly populated area, and Barking, Southend and Leigh-on-sea were little more than villages.

In June 1840 the London and Blackwall Railway (L&BR) started operation from Blackwall to a station called Minories and after a year this was extended to Fenchurch Street which was located close to the Tower of London. A month later in July 1840, the Eastern Counties Railway (ECR) opened their new station at Spitalfields and commenced running services to Brentwood and by 1843 this line had been extended to Colchester. The London and Blackwall Extension Railway (LBER), was opened from Stepney (now Limehouse) linking to the Eastern Counties Railway at Bow was opened in 1849. Unfortunately agreement between the L&BR and the ECR about operation of the services over the LBER could not be reached so the actual junction was not completed. An interchange station called Victoria Park and Bow was opened, but the ECR stopped few services there so most services terminated at Bromley and Bow. Services were withdrawn from Victoria Park and Bow on 6 January 1851.

=== Bills ===
The first railway proposed in 1835–6 was the Southend and Hole-Haven Railway which was opposed by another nascent railway company - the Thames Haven Dock and Railway Company. This company presented a bill in 1842 linking Stepney to Southend with a branch from South Ockendon to Tilbury which failed and their attempts to get the bills presented in the 1843 and 1844 parliamentary sessions foundered due to lack of funds. The ECR also considered presenting an act in 1844 but it was not until 1846 that four separate schemes were presented to Parliament that the idea gained any real traction.

The four schemes were:

- The London and South Essex Railway
- The London and Southend Railway
- Eastern Counties and Southend Railway
- The North Gravesend railway.

The North Gravesend Railway was so named as it ran to Tilbury where a ferry would connect across the Thames to Gravesend in Kent. This line would have had a junction with another line being built to North Woolwich in London. It was notable in that it did not have any plans for Southend whilst the Eastern Counties and Southend Railway and London & South Essex Railway schemes had branches to both. The London and Southend Railway only had a Southend line proposed with a junction at Shenfield. As it was none of these passed and in 1847, the ECR presented the Eastern Counties Extension bill which had a new junction on the Eastern Counties main line at Forest Gate. The bill was suspended in 1847 due to a log jam of schemes and in 1848 due to irregularities in the subscription list the bill was withdrawn. 1848 saw a slump in such schemes and it was not until 1851 that the L&BR presented a bill linking their railway at Gas Factory Junction and thence via the ECR to a new junction at Forest Gate with a line via Stratford, Barking, Rainham, Purfleet, Grays and Tilbury Fort.

The early 1851 bill was thrown out because of concerns over the lease clauses that Samuel Morton Peto and Thomas Brassey were putting forward. George Parker Bidder however kept the momentum going between the L&BR and the ECR and by October they had agreed a bid round a line from Forest Gate Junction to Southend via Tilbury. The new bill promoted by both railways was presented in November 1851 and was known as the London Tilbury and Southend Extension Railway bill. The line would be double track as far as Tilbury and single track onwards to Southend and included a single line branch to Thames Haven (although this was dropped during the passage of the bill). The line was to be managed by a committee of four ECR and four L&BR directors but there were no actual shareholder directors.

London, Tilbury and Southend Extension Railway Act 1852
- Act of Parliament
- Parliament of the United Kingdom
- Long title: An Act to enable the Eastern Counties and London and Blackwall Railway Companies to construct a Railway with Branches to Tilbury and Southend in the County of Essex, to provide a Steam Communication to Gravesend, and for other Purposes.
- Citation: 15 & 16 Vict. c. lxxxiv

Dates
- Royal assent: 17 June 1852

Text of statute as originally enacted

After several months of back and forth negotiations which included the completion of the junction at Bow to allow a through route from Stratford, a third line from Stepney to Fenchurch Street and additional platforms being provided at that station, the bill finally got royal assent on 17 June 1852 as the London, Tilbury and Southend Extension Railway Act 1852 (15 & 16 Vict. c. lxxxiv).

==== Joint committee ====
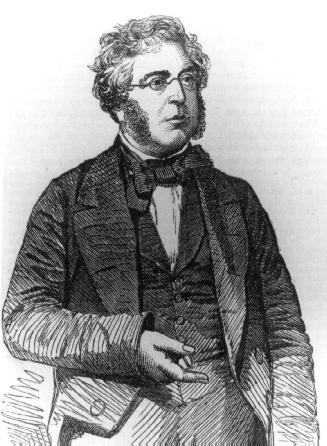
George Parker Bidder

The following ECR directors sat on the committee

- Lord Alfred Paget
- David Waddington – then the chairman of the ECR
- Richard Patterson – deputy chairman ECR
- Samuel Anderson

The L&BR directors were

- James Nugent Daniel – chairman L&BR
- William Haigh – deputy chairman L&BR
- Joseph Bishop
- Josiah Wilson

Other notable figures were Bidder (Engineer), William Tite architect and Arthur Wightman (Superintendent and Traffic Manager).

The joint committee (JC) entered into a £400,000 contract with Peto, Brassey and Betts to build and manage the line for a period of 25 (later reduced to 21) years.

=== Construction and opening ===
The railway was authorised in 1852 and work started about September 1852 on the Forest Gate to Tilbury section. The countryside was mostly flat and with the exception of a reasonably substantial cutting at Forest Gate there were only three other short cutting on the route. As part of the work dredging was undertaken between Gravesend and Tilbury and new pontoons for the ferries provided.

In parallel with the work on the line the ECR were preparing a third line between Stratford and Bow and the disputed junction at Bow was finally being connected to allow the LT&SR and ECR Woodford and Loughton services to access Fenchurch Street. The third line and new junctions were finished in February 1854. A special train ran on 11 April 1854 from Fenchurch Street to Tilbury which was the day of the formal Board of Trade inspection. Full services to the public began on 13 April 1854 with all Tilbury trains splitting at Stratford into a Bishopsgate and Fenchurch Street portion to reflect the joint ownership of the ECR and L&BR.

Work meanwhile was proceeding on the line to Southend via Stanford-le-hope and Pitsea. Predicted construction difficulties, among other reasons, saw a different (cheaper) route selected. Three miles of work had been done east of Tilbury by April 1854 and construction proceeded apace to allow opening to Leigh-on-Sea on 1 July 1855 with new intermediate stations at Benfleet and Pitsea. The line was built as single track with a passing loop at Pitsea but the Board of Trade official took a dislike to the arrangements, so a second track was built and opened in May 1856. Leigh-on-Sea station was built between the high street and the sea and many properties had their long gardens shortened as a result.

London, Tilbury and Southend Railway Deviation and Amendment Act 1854
- Act of Parliament
- Parliament of the United Kingdom
- Long title: An Act to alter the Line of the London, Tilbury, and Southend Extension Railway, to authorize the Lease thereof, and the Purchase of the Railway and certain Parts of the Works belonging to the Thames Haven Dock and Railway Company; and for other Purposes.
- Citation: 17 & 18 Vict. c. cxxxiii

Dates
- Royal assent: 3 July 1854

Text of statute as originally enacted

The next section to Southend opened on 1 March 1856 and was built as double track. The station was positioned away from the sea front near the High Street to avoid opposition from residents of the Royal Terrace in Southend. The original London, Tilbury and Southend Extension Railway Act 1852 had the line terminating by the pier, but this was changed by the London, Tilbury and Southend Railway Deviation and Amendment Act 1854 (17 & 18 Vict. c. cxxxiii).

Finally in this early phase, the branch to Thames Haven was constructed, but this was actually built by the Thames Haven Dock and Railway Authority (THR&DA) who had planned one of the early schemes to Romford with the LBR as early as 1836. The engineer was George Berkley (also the L&BR engineer at this date) and the line was built as a separate contract by Peto, Brassey and Betts. The railway was inspected on 27 April and opened to passengers and goods on 7 June 1855. The line was then sold to the LT&SR on 8 September 1855. The THR&DA still existed but were unable to construct the dock they hoped would bring additional rail traffic and eventually the scheme was abandoned in 1861. There were goods facilities at Thames Haven and a Margate boat train ran until 1880.

Locomotives and coaching stock was leased from the ECR. This stock was built by the ECR under John Viret Gooch and the LT&SR paid mileage costs.

=== The lessees railway (1854-1875) ===
The arrangements between ECR chairman David Waddington and Peto were being investigated by Horatio Love at the behest of dissatisfied ECR shareholders. One, of several issues, was the rental being paid by the LTSR for the new stock (cost £47,159) built at Stratford Works amounted to £400 per year which was not enough to cover the annual depreciation costs. By February 1856 it looked like Waddington might be forced out by the shareholders but Peto, Brassey, Betts and Bidder bought up large number of shares to ensure his survival. The lessees did agree to pay more money in 1861 on an agreed seven year review of the line.

In October 1855 Peto had approached the LTS Joint Committee for funds to build the Barking Branch linking the LBER at a point north-east of Gas Factory Junction to Barking West Junction. The new line had two purposes:

- To avoid Stratford railway station which with the growth of ECR services was becoming increasingly congested.
- To have an LTSR route free of the ECR should Waddington be deposed and relationships deteriorate between the lessees and the ECR (remember Fenchurch Street was L&BR at this time).

London, Tilbury and Southend Railway Amendment Act 1856
- Act of Parliament
- Parliament of the United Kingdom
- Long title: An Act to enable the Eastern Counties and London and Blackball Railway Companies to raise a further Sum of Money for the Purposes of the London, Tilbury, and Southend Extension Railway; to amend the Acts relating to such Undertaking; and for other Purposes.
- Citation: 19 & 20 Vict. c. xv

Dates
- Royal assent: 5 June 1856

Text of statute as originally enacted

London, Tilbury and Southend Railway Act 1875
- Act of Parliament
- Parliament of the United Kingdom
- Long title: An Act for conferring further powers upon the London, Tilbury, and Southend Railway Company.
- Citation: 38 & 39 Vict. c. lvii

Dates
- Royal assent: 14 June 1875

Text of statute as originally enacted

The price of the ECR supporting the bill was extensive with the LTSR still having to pay for the use of the route through Stratford. ECR Fenchurch Street services to North Woolwich and Loughton would have running rights over the line and provide a pair of new curves at Abbey Mills (east of Bromley) to access the North Woolwich line. The London, Tilbury and Southend Railway Amendment Act 1856 (19 & 20 Vict. c. xv) received royal assent in July 1856. The Joint Committee had already appointed Peto, Brassey, Betts to undertake the work which started the same month. Progress was swift and by 31 March 1858 the new line and Abbey Mills south curve was opened. The north curve was never opened and although it periodically was raised in GE/LT&SR meetings, the London, Tilbury and Southend Railway Act 1875 (38 & 39 Vict. c. lvii) formally abandoned this proposed line.

The connection on the LBER to the LTSR was too far from the Gas Factory Junction signal box, under the rules at that time, for the LTSR junction to be controlled from the Gas Factory Junction signal box. Therefore, an extra box was built in 1858 by the new junction, and the new junction was named Bromley Junction. In 1866 the GER took control of the LBR and LBER, and in 1869 resignalled those lines. This resulted in a new signal box for Gas Factory Junction but closer to the LTSR, and both the old signal box and that at Bromley Junction being closed. To solve the problem of Bromley Junction being too far from the new Gas Factory Junction box, the LTSR points were moved down to the new box, and the LTSR rails gauntletted amongst the LBER rails until they reached the track bed junction. By this method, the new box was able to control both the NLR junction and the LTSR junction. The name Bromley Junction was re-used at the junction on the LTSR at Bromley-by-Bow where the line from the NLR joined, also in 1869. In 1886, the GER built a goods depot at Bow Road which had to connect to the LBER, between the NLR and LTSR junctions. This caused the GER to have to resolve the gauntletted track here. As a result, they built yet another new box which was again a little nearer to the LTSR, and at last they were able to move the LTSR points back to their original position and rid themselves of the gauntletting.

During 1854 through to 1856 the line from Tilbury was extended in stages to Southend finally opening on 1 March 1856.

Waddington resigned in July 1856 (days after the Barking Branch had its royal assent) and was replaced by Horatio Love as ECR chairman. Both sides engaged in presenting schemes to parliament to try and win some advantage but all failed and this effectively finished Peto as a major player in the East Anglian rail scene.

London, Tilbury and Southend Railway Act 1862
- Act of Parliament
- Parliament of the United Kingdom
- Long title: An Act to incorporate the Proprietors of Shares in the Undertaking called the London, Tilbury, and Southend Extension Railway, and to vest such Undertaking in the Company so incorporated; and for other Purposes.
- Citation: 25 & 26 Vict. c. viii

Dates
- Royal assent: 16 May 1862

The London, Tilbury and Southend Railway Act 1862 (25 & 26 Vict. c. viii) saw the status of the company change from a jointly owned undertaking to a separate company. 1862 was the same year the Great Eastern Railway was formed by amalgamation. The railways in East Anglia were in financial trouble, and most were leased to the ECR; they wished to amalgamate formally, but could not obtain government agreement for this until 1862. A further change saw the L&BR taken over on a 999 year old lease by the GER and whilst the LB&R directors remained the balance of power on the LTSR board was now firmly in the GER's favour.

In 1864 Operations Manager Arthur Wightman died and was succeeded by Joseph Louth.

By 1866 Peto and Betts were both bankrupt and Brassey died in 1870. The line largely stagnated with no additional investment and the lessees place on the board taken actual shareholders and after 1870, following his death by Brassey's executors who had little interest in operation of the railway. With the lease finishing in 1875 the decision to let the things run on was taken. This did not stop the GER asking for improvements (in 1868) to the permanent way after concerns had been raised and it was their locomotives operating the timetable. Improvements were made in the next few years.

=== Getting control (1875-1881) ===
With a GER majority on the board, the independent directors had little opportunity to influence or run the railway. Attempt to negotiate a way forward in 1872 were rejected by the GER and an 1874 bill presented on behalf of the shareholders to gain independent control was rejected by Parliament. After the positions became vacant, the shareholders elected Charles Bischoff as chairman, and Henry Doughty Brown as deputy chairman at a meeting on 15 September 1874. During 1873–1874 another shareholder named Eley had approached various other railways such as the NLR, LNWR and Great Northern Railway none of whom were interested in the LT&SR. On 4 November 1874 the GER Chairman Lightly Simpson was replaced by Henry Charles Parkes who was on the LT&SR board, a significant LT&SR shareholder and sympathetic to getting the problem resolved.

The LT&SR employed outside assistance to understand the state of the railway and a report was delivered on 31 March 1875. The GER could have taken over the LT&SR at this time and it is not known why this did not happen. By the end of May 1875 an operating agreement had been reached between the two railways and the arrangements were applied from July 1875 (although for legal reasons everything was not sorted out for another year). Importantly the LT&SR were granted running powers into Fenchurch Street. In terms of rolling stock the LT&SR were now the customer rather than the lessees and any GER staff operating over the LT&SR were to be treated as LT&SR for rules purposes.

The board had employed Arthur Stride ahead of the takeover as General Manager and resident engineer, Louth his predecessor had his employment terminated about the same time. The company secretary was John Fisher-Kennell (ex L&BR who died on 2 February 1881 and was succeeded by H. Cecil Newton who held the post until 1912.

On takeover in 1875 the LT&SR was an old fashioned railway albeit in reasonable condition. An accident at Barking resulted in the company having to pay considerable compensation. The reason for the crash was down to time interval working so an early decision was taken to extend signalling interlocking which was delivered in the early 1880s. The track was all re-laid between 1877 and 1880 and new facilities such as additional sidings and platform extensions were added to the budget. A works/engine shed facility was provided at Plaistow and orders for new locomotives and rolling stock placed.

=== An independent company (1881-1912) ===
==== Tilbury Docks ====
Construction started on 8 July 1882 but was not straightforward with the first contractor getting into difficulties in 1884 and being replaced by Lucas and Aird. When finished the docks were over £1 million over budget.

The changes to the rail network were:

- A set of exchange sidings with the LT&SR located at Tilbury Dock North Junction with a new signal box
- A new station called Tilbury Dock which opened on 15 June 1885
- A secondary connection at Tilbury West Junction to a new station (for boat trains) called Tidal Basin (later called Tilbury Marine)
- An improved service of 24 trains per day was provided to the new station from 1886 but was cut back in 1889 after the dock failed to live up to expectations.

The docks opened on 17 April 1886 but were not a success in generating the additional rail traffic the LT&SR expected until early in the twentieth century.

The docks had its own fleet of locomotives for shunting purposes housed in an independent engine shed and in 1909 Tilbury, along with the upstream docks, became part of the newly established Port of London Authority (PLA).

==== Southend to Shoeburyness ====
Peto had first suggested extension to Shoeburyness in 1855 but it was not until the 1870s that the LT&SR resurrected the idea. The War Office had a large military establishment at Pig's Bay Shoeburyness and the LT&SR hoped they would see the benefit of a direct rail link from Southend. The initial response was not positive but the LT&SR presented a bill in the parliamentary session hoping the War Department would change their minds. This was not to be and the bill was withdrawn. By 1881 the War Department had changed its mind and the LT&SR presented a bill (see below) to parliament in 1882. This became law on 24 July 1882.

The contract to build the line was let to Kirk and Parry in October 1882 and work commenced in January 1883. Southend station became a through station and there were no intermediate stations. Operations started on 1 February 1884 and the new Shoeburyness station which also had goods facilities. The first up train each morning was formed of some carriages and a locomotive that worked from Southend (where the engine shed was located) but it was not until 1889 that an engine shed was actually provided at Shoeburyness and the Southend shed closed. An intermediate station at Thorpe Bay was opened in 1912 with a further station at Southend East opening in LMS days.

==== Barking to Pitsea ====
Another new line included in the LT&SR 1882 bill was for a new cut off line from Barking to Pitsea. As the LT&SR started to move away from GER influence there was perceived need to claim the area between the Great Eastern Main line and the line to Tilbury. Additionally it was recognised that with the opening of Tilbury Docks more goods trains may render the two track section inadequate. A direct line would see most Southend trains diverted from the Tilbury line and improved journey times.

A sod cutting ceremony was held at Upminster Windmill on 11 October 1883. Two intermediate stations were provided on the new double track railway at Dagenham and Hornchurch. There were four new signal boxes and the line between Barking and Upminster opened to traffic on 1 May 1885. The next section to East Horndon was opened exactly a year later on 1 May 1886. beyond East Horndon the line was on an upward gradient to the summit at Laindon where a new station was built.

At Pitsea a large retaining wall was built to support the hill side (on which the 13th-century church of St. Michael stood) and two new platforms provided. The original 1855 station site on the original line to Tilbury was moved slightly north.

Full opening to Pitsea on 1 June 1888 although a storm on 1 August caused closure of the new line until 1 October.

==== The GER opens a Southend branch ====
The following year the GER opened a branch line from Shenfield, through to Wickford in 1888 and onto Southend on 1 October 1889.

Built as single track initially, it was doubled in 1901. The initial timetable of six trains per day which involved a change at Shenfield for Liverpool Street passengers. By 1890 the GER was competing more vigorously and making inroads into the LT&SR holiday traffic. On one bank holiday they ran excursion trains from Fenchurch Street to Southend (GE) and as all the ticket clerks at that station were employed by the GER, passengers were directed to the GER trains rather than the LT&S services. The LT&SR employed ticket clerks at Fenchurch Street soon after. This and improvements to the weekday services made an impact on the LT&SR finances but population increases along the LT&SR route saw that change later on.

==== Branches from Upminster ====
In the 1890s two branches were opened centred on Upminster. One ran from Romford whilst the other ran to Grays giving a through route from Upminster to Tilbury.

The line from Grays with one intermediate station at Ockendon opened in 1892 with the Romford–Upminster line opening on 7 June 1893. Both lines were single track although Ockendon had a passing loop.

A station called Emerson Park was opened to serve a nearby estate at Great Nelmes in 1908.

Ockendon had a small goods yard and a yard was opened at Romford as well.

The LT&SR station at Romford was a single platform with a run round loop to enable locomotives to get to the other end of the train. There was also a connection to the Great Eastern main line used by goods traffic.

A bay platform was provided for the Upminster service at Grays in 1890.

==== Tottenham and Forest Gate Railway ====
The Tottenham and Forest Gate Railway was a railway line in north London, formed by the Tottenham and Forest Gate Railway Act 1890 (53 & 54 Vict. c. clviii), and built as joint venture between the Midland Railway and the London, Tilbury and Southend Railway. It officially opened on 1 July 1894 with passenger services to East Ham and Southend commencing eight days later.

Some goods exchange sidings were provided at Woodgrange Park which is where Midland locomotives would have been exchanged for LT&SR locomotives and wagons would have been shunted between the various companies trains.

The GER services continued to use the goods yard at Barking for the same purpose but this had limited siding space.

In terms of passenger trains a daily Southend to St Pancras train (out in the morning back in the evening) was the most notable through working.

==== Whitechapel and Bow Railway ====
A similar scheme to this was presented by the Metropolitan Railway in 1883 and supported by the LT&SR but failed because the District Railway refused to allow through running by LT&SR trains over their line between St. Mary's Junction and Aldgate East. Thirteen years later the scheme was revived by the Metropolitan District Railway and was a joint development between them and the LT&SR . The plan was to extend the underground line eastwards from Whitechapel and would join the LT&SR west of Bromley station at Campbell Road Junction. The LT&SR backed this scheme as congestion at Fenchurch Street was becoming a problem and their longer distance traffic was growing. It was hoped the new line would divert some of the "inner" London traffic away releasing much needed capacity.

The Whitechapel and Bow Railway Act 1897 (60 & 61 Vict. c. cclvii) was largely untroubled in its passage through Parliament and became law on 6 August 1897. The bill noted the line could be worked by steam or electric power.

Work commenced in May 1899 with Cuthbert Arthur Brereton appointed as the chief engineer. The new line was two miles long most of which was underground and built using the cut-and-cover method. The line passed under the Regent's Canal and then climbed steeply to join the LT&SR line at Campbell Road Junction (which was on a viaduct at this location).

Opening on 31 May 1902 a special train, which had originated at Earl's Court and on arrival at Whitechapel the engine was changed for an LT&SR locomotive for working through to Upminster. After some trial running of empty trains on 1 June, the full service commenced running on the following day. The January 1903 timetable had 58 trains each way using the new line. A few services terminated short at Plaistow, with the majority terminating at East Ham, whilst three worked through to Upminster (peak hours only). Both railways purchased additional carriages although all services were worked by District locomotives. Some sidings and locomotive coaling and watering facilities were supplied at East Ham in connection with the new service. These sidings later became known as little Ilford.

The peak hour Upminster services proved popular and more followed. This did not help the original goal of the scheme to relieve congestion at Fenchurch Street and it should be noted at this stage in its development, that the LTS line was a two track railway and difficulties in pathing trains later led to additional tracks being considered. Why further doubling was not pursued prior to 1902 is unclear so the LT&SR had to endure a period of poor performance having previously had an excellent reputation.

==== Quadrupling to East Ham ====
Powers for widening the Plaistow to East Ham section had been sought by the LT&SR in 1898 and West Ham station was built with four platforms in the same year. The new lines opened at various times as listed below:

Stepped quadrupling
Date	From	To	Description
5 April 1903	Plaistow	Upton Park	Additional Down line opened (temporary arrangement)
12 October 1903	Plaistow	Upton Park	Four lines in service arranged up/up/down/down
15 May 1904	Plaistow	West Ham	Four lines in service now arranged up/down/up/down (temporary arrangement)
26 February 1905	Campbell Road Junction	Bromley West End	Four tracks – temporary bay platform set up so District Line services that had been terminating at Bow could work through.
9 July 1905	Upper Abbey Mills Junction	Plaistow West End	Four tracks – this section included two new single line bridges across the GER at West Ham.
1 August 1905	Bromley West End	Upper Abbey Mills Junction	Additional tracks – four platforms at Bromley and new bridge across Bow Creek/River Lea Opened

Accompanying the civil engineering work described above a complete re-signalling of the area also took place with seven new boxes replacing all older boxes except the recently built West Ham box along with three new ground frame boxes. Nine sets of crossovers were added between the Local and newly built Through lines.

==== Electrification and developments at Barking ====
In order to extend the four tracks from East Ham to Barking, considerable work was undertaken at the west end of the station and the station itself was rebuilt with eight platform faces, two of which would be used for the District Line electric services to terminate in.

Barking station had been rebuilt in 1889 with three through lines but still had awkward level crossings on Tanner and East Street which caused delays to road traffic and a number of fatalities had resulted from its use. A bridge solution was agreed with the local council to allow closure of the level crossing and when construction started, 130 mostly recently built terrace houses had to be demolished. After demolition construction started in January 1906.

Part of the scheme was to construct sidings at Little Ilford to the west of Barking for stabling carriages for both the LT&SR and District Line. A nine track yard for goods was also added here in 1909 to replace the congested facility at Woodgrange Park (see goods section below).

Between East Ham and Barking there were six running lines as far as the bridges over the River Roding and then an additional goods loop as far as the station. North to south the lines were:

- Branch Lines - primarily for goods trains and passenger trains from TF&G
- Local Lines - primarily for District Lines serving platforms 4 and 5 (dead end bay platforms)
- Through Lines - primarily for main line trains.

The junction at the east end allowed access from the Tilbury line to Forest Gate via platforms 2 and 3.

Whilst this was going on, the electrification of the Local Lines used by the District was taking place between Campbell Road Junction (west of Bromley) and Barking. This was undertaken by the Underground Electric Railways Company of London. On 20 August 1905 electric trains started operation to East Ham and used the Little Ilford facility to the east where six electrified sidings were opened. Steam services over the District Line now ceased. The LT&SR bought 37 motor and trailer cars for operation by the District Line and these were part of the District Fleet and carried LT&SR ownership plates. A further 8 LT&SR owned motor and trailer cars were purchased in 1911 (as part of a bigger District Line order).

Full electric services to Barking commenced on 1 April 1908 and platforms 2 and 3 were electrified in 1911.

=== Sale ===
Over the years there had been a number of opportunities where the LT&SR could have been acquired by the Great Eastern Railway. In fact Arthur Stride stated in 1912 "that to my knowledge we have told the GER for the last 36 years that we are on sale". Some negotiations had been undertaken in this time but had generally failed on the question of the financial return on preference shares. The LT&SR generally returned 6% compared to the GER 4.5% so shareholders were unlikely to vote for a financially worse deal.

In 1901 the Midland Railway and North London Railway (representing the London & North Western Railway) approached the LT&SR who decided to pursue the Midland offer. Kay suggests the GER were largely aware of the sale but no arrangement was reached so the LT&SR shareholders voted for a deal with the Midland Railway on 26 June 1911.

The sale had to be ratified by a parliamentary bill which the Midland presented in the 1912 legislative session.

The period was one of great unrest and there were a number of strikes during 1910-1912 which almost led to the abandonment of the bill by the Midland.

A couple of local incidents during the London Dockers strike in 1912 included:

- A train of strike breakers was stopped by a mob of strikers at Purfleet and the strike breakers "roughly dealt with"
- City of Birmingham Police officers guarding arrested strikers had to force their way onto a train through a large mob at Grays
- The Dublin Fusiliers was deployed to protect railway assets and protect strike breakers in the Tilbury area.

Midland Railway (London, Tilbury and Southend Railway Purchase) Act 1912
- Act of Parliament
- Parliament of the United Kingdom
- Long title: An Act for vesting the undertaking of the London Tilbury and Southend Railway Company in the Midland Railway Company and for other purposes.
- Citation: 2 & 3 Geo. 5. c. c

Dates
- Royal assent: 7 August 1912

Text of statute as originally enacted

The Midland Railway persevered and the bill was passed as the Midland Railway (London, Tilbury and Southend Railway Purchase) Act 1912 (2 & 3 Geo. 5. c. c) on 7 August 1912 although legally the sale was backdated to 1 January. The Midland took over the LT&S on the same day.

When the Midland took over some of the senior staff left as they were offered lower status posts. Stride, who had been central in the last 37 years to the operation of the railway had no obvious successor and took retirement aged 69.

=== After the sale ===
The Midland Railway continued operation until World War I broke out when management transferred to the National Railway Executive. The war finished in 1918 and the Midland continued operation until 1 January 1923. Operation was then taken over by the London, Midland and Scottish Railway who continued in operation until 1939 when the National Railway Executive once again took over management of the line during World War II. In 1945 the line was returned to the LMS but from 1 January 1948 the line was nationalised and the part from Fenchurch Street to Gas Factory Junction became part of the Eastern Region whilst the rest of the network was part of the London Midland region. This geographical anomaly did not last long and the whole line transferred to the Eastern Region on 20 February 1949.

In 2021 the network is largely intact the only closures being Tilbury Riverside station and the lines that led to it.

== Geographical development ==
The railway serves three main routes. The main line runs from Fenchurch Street to Shoeburyness via Upminster over a distance of 39 miles 40 chains (63.6 km). A loop line between Barking and Pitsea provides an alternative route via Rainham (Essex), Grays and Tilbury. Finally, there is a short branch line connecting the main line at Upminster with the loop line at Grays via Ockendon.

The table below refers to the key sections of the line and which company built them. Fenchurch Street to Gas Factory Junction was built before the LT&SR existed but the company was granted running rights over this line as part of the parliamentary legislation authorising the line

Geographical development
From-to	Date Opened	Remarks
Fenchurch Street - Stepney	July 1840	Opened by the London and Blackwall Railway originally to Minories in July 1840 and Fenchurch Street on 20 July 1841
Stepney - Bow Junction	2 April 1849	Opened by the London and Blackwall Railway but closed in 1851 after a dispute with the ECR.
Bow Junction - Forest Gate Junction	June 1839	Opened by the Eastern Counties Railway in 1840 as part of their main line to Colchester
Forest Gate Junction - Tilbury Fort	11 April 1854	The first railway built by the LT&SR
Tilbury - Stanford-le-hope	14 August 1856	After this line opened most LT&SR services were routed this way
Tilbury East - Tilbury West	14 August 1856	There is some uncertainty about the exact date
Thames Haven Junction to Thames Haven	7 June 1855	Single track branch
Stanford-le-hope - Leigh	1 July 1855	Built as single track with a passing loop at Pitsea but upgraded to double track by May 1856
Leigh - Southend	1 March 1856	Built as double track
Gas Factory Junction - Barking	11 March 1858	After this line opened most LT&SR services were routed this way - a curve at Abbey Mills was also opened at this time.
Tilbury Port lines	1882-1886	Although not part of the LTSR the goods traffic and boat train traffic was an important revenue source for the LT&SR.
Southend - Shoeburyness	1 February 1884	
Barking - Upminster	1 May 1885	
Upminster - East Horndon	1 May 1886	
East Horndon - Pitsea	1 July 1888	The station at Pitsea was rebuilt around the new junction.
Upminster - Grays	1892	Via Ockendon
Romford - Upminster	7 June 1893	This gave the LTSR a link with the GER at Romford. A small goods yard was also provided.

== Infrastructure ==
=== Stations ===
The following stations (with their original names) were served by the LT&SR between 1854 and 1912.

Main line
Station name	Opened	Built by	Remarks
Fenchurch Street	1841	L&BR	The L&BR initially used a temporary terminus at Minories from June 1840.
Burdett Road	1848	LBER	LT&SR called from 1891 as part of a deal with the GER who started calling at Bromley-by-Bow
Stepney	1840	L&BR	Junction for Blackwall branch
Bromley	1858	LT&SR	Served by the District Line electric services from 1902
West Ham	1901	LT&SR	Served by the District Line services from 1902
Plaistow	1858	LT&SR	Served by the District Line services from 1902
Upton Park	1877	LT&SR	Served by the District Line services from 1902 - largely funded by a property developer named Read.
East Ham	1858	LT&SR	Served by the District Line services which terminated there from 1902 - 1905
Barking	1854	LT&SR	Rebuilt 1908, Junction for Tilbury Loop, Served by the District line electric services from 1908
Dagenham	1885	LT&SR	Served by the District line (steam services) until 1905.
Hornchurch	1885	LT&SR	
Upminster	1885	LT&SR	LT&SR branch lines to Grays and Romford opened in 1892 and 1893 respectively
East Horndon	1886	LT&SR	Acted as temporary terminus 1886-1888
Laindon	1888	LT&SR	
Pitsea	1886	LT&SR	Replaced the first Pitsea station of 1855 which was located on the Tilbury Loop (see below)
Benfleet	1855	LT&SR	
Leigh-on-Sea	1855	LT&SR	Acted as temporary terminus 1855–1856
Westcliff	1895	LT&SR	
Southend	1855	LT&SR	Was the terminus from 1856 until 1884 when the line was extended to Shoeburyness. Renamed Southend Central in 1889 after the GER opened their new line to Southend Victoria
Thorpe Bay	1910	LT&SR	Was named Southchurch-on-Sea for 17 days after opening.
Shoeburyness	1884	LT&SR	Terminus of line.

The Tilbury Loop
Station name	Opened	Built by	Remarks
Barking	1854	LT&SR	
Dagenham Dock	1908	LT&SR	
Rainham	1854	LT&SR	
Purfleet Rifle Range	1911	LT&SR	Opened for military use only, A siding had opened two years earlier
Purfleet	1854	LT&SR	Was adjacent to the Botany Bay Pleasure Gardens
Grays	1854	LT&SR	Junction for branch to Upminster opened in 1892
Tilbury Dock	1885	LT&SR	Opened at the time Tilbury Docks were being constructed
Tilbury	1854	LT&SR	Southend trains would reverse in the station. The ferries to and from Gravesend were timed to connect with London services and the journey time was 10 minutes.
Low Street	1858	LT&SR	Junction for the Thameshaven branch line
Horndon	1854	LT&SR	
Pitsea	1855	LT&SR	Original station opened south of current station and was closed in 1885 when the direct line to Upminster opened

Other stations
Station name	Opened	Built by	Remarks
Stratford	1840	ECR	Trains split for Fenchurch Street and Bishopsgate between 1854 and 1858 at Stratford.
Thames Haven	1855	LT&SR	Only station on Thames Haven Branch
Ockendon	1892	LT&SR	Only station on Upminster to Grays line when opened.
Emerson Park	1908	LT&SR	Only station between Romford and Upminster
Romford	1893	LT&SR	Single platform with run round loop - was adjacent to ECR station built 1840. A small goods yard was also built.
Gravesend	1854	LT&SR	Although not a railway station a such, LT&SR ticket offices existed at Gravesend West Street and Town piers for through tickets

==== Architecture ====
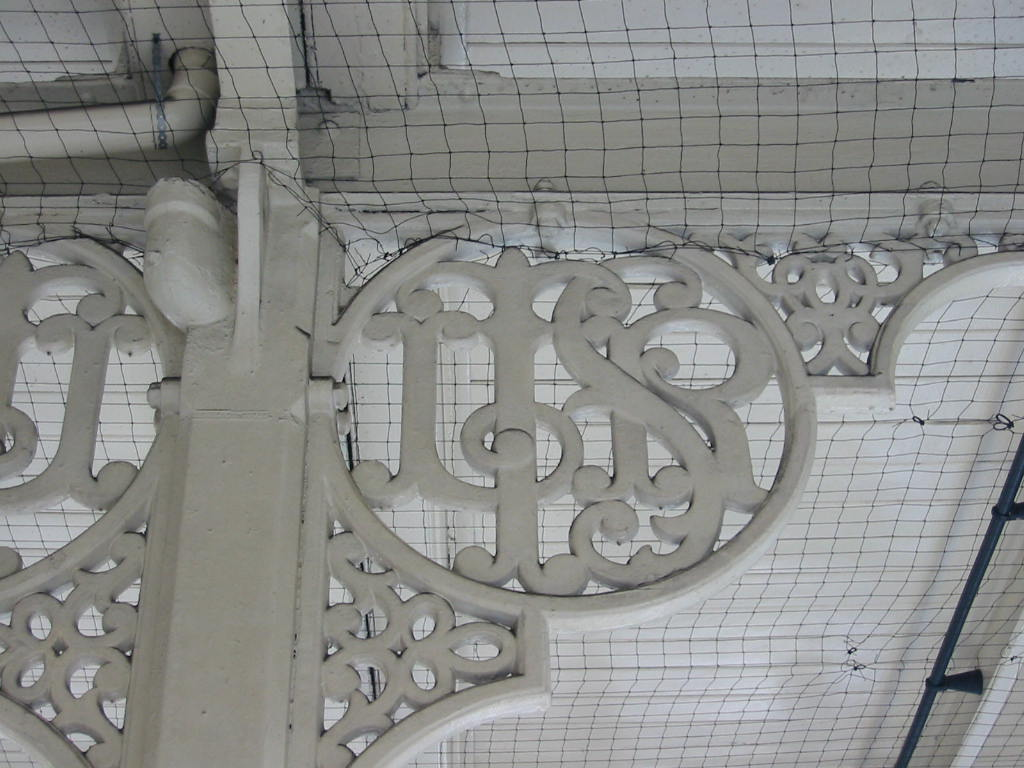
LTSR East Ham LT&SR spandrel

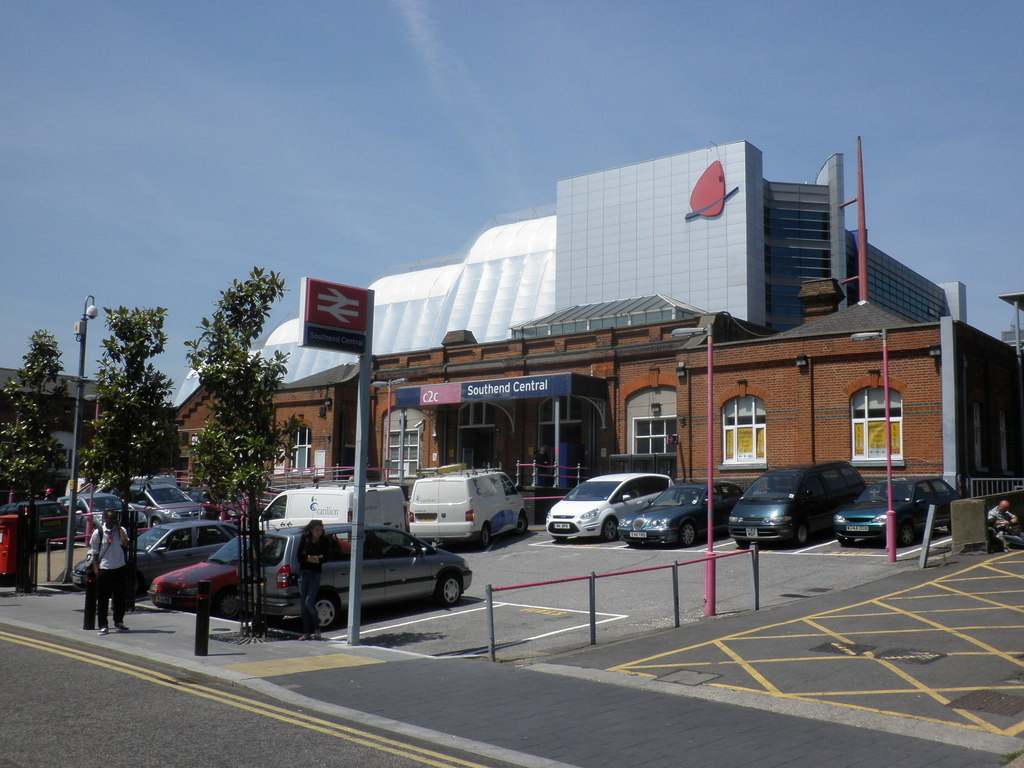
A modern view of the LT&SR Southend Station (geograph 2471994)

The early stations were built to a variety of styles, some in wood and some in brick. Thames Haven, Tilbury and Southend had wooden train shed roofs and Southend had the grandest station on the network. The initial platforms were all of wooden construction.

Due to marshy ground conditions some stations such as Shoeburyness and Rainham were built of wood.

Stations built from the 1880s generally had three separately roofed parts. A signal storey ticket office, double storey station masters house and single level block was the typical arrangement constructed of red brick with bands of dark blue bricks and yellow bricks around the windows. This design was attributed to George Hopkins and similar examples could be found at Soham, Fordham and the London, Chatham & Dover Railway between Bearstead and Ashford. Various changes occurred over the following years and the new Westcliffe and the re-sited Leigh-on-Sea stations were built in yellow brick.

Later stations at Thorpe Bay and Benfleet were built in a "Domestic revival" style again with yellow brick with the tops stories being rendered.

=== Engine sheds and works ===
The LTSR had five engine sheds, but in the early years the ECR (and from 1862 the GER's) Stratford engine shed provided locomotives up until July 1880.

==== Plaistow ====
Plaistow Works were built adjacent to the station on the north side of the line to the west of the station between 1879 and 1880. Initially the works and engine shed were combined but as the operation grew, a separate engine shed was opened in 1899 adjoining the western end of the works.

This was replaced in 1911 by a new shed on the opposite side of the tracks. Steam locomotives for Fenchurch Street passenger services were coaled and watered here.

==== Tilbury ====
The engine shed was located in the triangle of tracks where the Tilbury Riverside branch joined the Tilbury Loop. The original two-track wooden shed was rebuilt with an expanded 4 track brick structure in 1906.

There was a carriage shed here until 1870 when it burnt down.

==== Upminster ====
A small engine shed was built when the line opened in 1885 and closed in 1932 when the District Line was extended to Upminster. It had a turntable, coaling stage and water cranes and when the Grays to Romford lines opened in 1892–1893 it was used to house locomotives that worked those services.

==== Southend ====
The engine shed was located at Southend Central railway station and opened when the line opened and it had a two track shed and turntable.

When the line was extended to Shoeburyness on 1 February 1884 this, and the need to extend the station on a limited site, sealed the fate of the Southend shed and a new shed was provided at Shoeburyness in 1889.

==== Shoeburyness ====
The line opened on 1 February 1884 but the engine shed did not open here until 1889. Between 1884 and 1889 locomotives were supplied from Southend.

=== Signalling ===
In the early years the time interval system was used on the LT&SR. Signals were controlled by station staff who would place them at danger after a train had passed. After the train had left the section and after a certain amount of time the signal was cleared for the next train. The LT&SR had no clear rules on how long the interval was - in fact they had no rule book at all in the early days. At junctions, huts on stilts controlled the points and signals but there was no interlocking so a route could be set across the route of another train with the potential for an accident.

The main signals at this time had a semaphore arm and had three settings:

- Horizontal - red light - do not proceed.
- At 45 degrees - green light - proceed with caution
- At 90 degrees (pointing up) - white light - proceed

Distant signals were provided and when set at danger the driver had to stop his train and then proceed with caution into the section ahead.

When Stride took over as engineer in 1875, he introduced Absolute block signalling. During 1880–81 signal boxes were being built across the network and block instruments were moved into them (often from station buildings). Interlocking at the junctions was introduced between 1875 and completed by 1881.

== Operations ==
=== Passenger ===
==== Early timetables ====
The first timetable (1854) consisted of 11 trains each way which ran from Tilbury with ferry connections from Gravesend. The timetable was a mix of fast and stopping trains with the smaller stations at Grays, Purfleet, Rainham and Barking getting seven trains up trains per day, whilst in the down direction Barking and Grays had eight stops whilst the others stayed on seven. On arrival at Stratford the train split into two portions with one portion went for Fenchurch Street (calling Stepney where connections for NLR services to Chalk Farm were available) and the other for Bishopsgate (some of which called at Mile End).

By 1856 the line had opened to Southend and the service consisted of six Tilbury and four Southend (via Tilbury services). All trains were stopping at Barking and Grays whilst Purfleet and Rainham still had a service of seven trains per day.

By 1858 services were using the Barking to Gas Factory Junction line and the weekday timetable of 1863 had 16 trains in. These broke down as:

- Southend via Tilbury = 6 services
- Tilbury = 8 services
- Barking = 2 services from Fenchurch Street all stations supplemented by four trains from Bishopsgate operated by the ECR.

There was an 8.20 am Southend - Fenchurch Street express arriving at 9.40 am and an evening departure at 4.25 pm arriving 05.45 pm. This had been introduced in the 1861 timetable and was designed to attract people to live in Southend.

The 1863 timetable was typical of the timetables that were worked through to the end of the lease.

It is worth noting that in 1863 Fenchurch Street was being used by the London & Blackwall Railway, the Eastern Counties Railway and the North London Railway.

==== 1858–1875 under the lessees ====
The line was run by Wightman until his death in 1864 and by Louth thereafter largely from the L&BR offices at Fenchurch Street. The LTS staff consisted of station and line maintenance staff as well as a small number of signalling staff. Most signalling was undertaken by station staff and operation was on the time interval system which carried inherent risks of collision (more so when it was foggy).

The ECR/GER locomotives that ran the LT&SR were all allocated to Stratford engine shed and although there were engine sheds at Southend and Tilbury they had no allocation of their own. There was no set pool of ECR/GER locomotives allocated to LTSR services which required 8-10 regular locomotive and up to 5 more on special days for boat trains, excursions and/or cattle trains.

Locomotives used at this time included:

- Gooch designed 2-2-2T engines built by the ECR in 1853–1854 at Stratford Works for specific use on the LT&S.
- Sinclair Y class 2-4-0
- Johnson "Little Sharpie" 2-4-0
- Johnson 477 Class 0-6-0
- Johnson 134 Class 0-4-4T

Generally 60 carriages were required to work the service with additional carriages hired in as required.

==== Timetables in the later years ====
From 1869 the North London Railway started operating a service from Chalk Farm to Plaistow via the new curve between Bow and Bromley stations. In various guises (sometimes as a short shuttle from Bow) this service continued throughout the life of the LT&SR and in 1880 a dedicated bay platform was provided on the down side of that station. Following the quadrupling of 1905 this switched to a new bay on the up side at Plaistow. The service was discontinued as a wartime economy measure in World War I on 1 January 1916.

To supplement the up morning Southend express, a non-stop train was introduced from Tilbury to Fenchurch Street in 1876 and in 1881 this was timed back to start at Southend. In 1884 the Southend Expresses were timed to start back from Shoeburyness and when the cut off route via Upminster was opened in 1888 there was a ten-minute improvement in journey time from Southend to London. An additional up morning train was added and it was hoped that 45 minutes between Southend and Fenchurch Street could be achieved. That did not happen thanks to an additional station stop at Westcliff-on-sea opened in 1895.

It is worth noting that the population of Southend was rapidly increasing around the turn of the century. The 1891 census recorded a population of 12,333 and by 1911 had increased by 50,400 to 62,733 (and ten years later to 106,000). Between 1890 and 1910 more peak hour Southend services were added but overcrowding was rife. Some Tilbury line services were diverted after 1892 to run via Ockenden to give an alternative route for Hornchurch and Upminster passengers.

The increased long distance LT&SR traffic led to a need to increase capacity. The quadrupling of the line between East Ham (later Barking) and Campbell Road Junction near Bromley meant the LT&SR could withdraw local services along that line. The District operated a few services to Upminster and by 1911 were running through trains from Southend to Ealing, Putney Bridge and Hammersmith in west London. The Midland railway also operated a Southend to St Pancras service but this was not as popular and took 1 hour 35 minutes.

In 1894 the Midland introduced four Southend to St Pancras trains each way and a Midland Railway locomotive was outbased at Shoeburyness. The Midland stated they could not operate the service and after some negotiation the LT&SR started operating these trains into St Pancras with one of their engines overnighting at Kentish Town engine shed.

==== Special trains ====
Even before the railway reached Southend, Southend attracted steamers with day trippers.

From early days the LT&SR carried large numbers of day trippers and had to hire carriages to supplement its own rolling stock. By the 1870s on the bank holidays the L&SR was carrying 20,000 passengers on the August bank holidays and that had increased by 10,000 in the 1880s. The arrival of the GER made some inroads into this traffic but the traffic continued to rise until the 1900s. Interestingly the steamer traffic still carried significant numbers.

Other special trains operated over the LT&SR included (selected from 1909):

- P&O trains for staff and baggage between Tilbury Docks and London Docks
- A boat train from Liverpool Street to Tilbury for the SS Macedonia
- Truman's Horses - special GER trains to Tilbury Docks (PLA)
- Special horse train from Chinley - Midland locomotive worked through to Tilbury
- Chatham Dockyard to Tilbury - Naval personnel/chests and hammocks - worked by GER locomotive to Tilbury.

There is a section on boat train operation in the Tilbury Riverside entry.

=== Goods ===
Although predominantly a passenger railway the LTS did carry freight in increasing tonnages throughout its life especially after the opening of the docks at Tilbury. In 1854 freight was quite low being predominantly agricultural products into London and household coal into the area. Coal for the locomotive depots at Southend and Tilbury would have also been carried (probably as part of local freight services at this time). In the early days freight trains into the area would have been routed via Stratford station. In the early years there were only two freight trains in the WTT from Brick Lane (a depot on the approaches to Bishopsgate ECR although other freight trains to meet short term requirements would have run (e.g. cattle specials). Various freight depots were built by other train companies on the approaches to Fenchurch Street (mainly because of good access to the city) and the LTSR operated two of these – Mint Street and Goodman's Yard.

After 1876 goods trains from the north which had been routed via the North London Line and Stratford were instead routed via Bow and the 1869 curve to Bromley station. Sidings installed in 1877 at Plaistow now acted as the interchange point where locomotives and crews were changed. In 1884 there were four regular goods flows consisting of one train each way. namely:

- Goodman's Yard (Minories) - Shoeburyness
- Goodman's Yard (Minories) - Southend
- Plaistow -Tilbury
- Plaistow to Thames Haven

The GER worked two trains per day to Barking and the NLR one to Plaistow.

With the opening of the Tottenham & Forest Gate Railway Midland Railway goods trains started using that route and in 1897 exchange sidings were established at Woodgrange Park which were also used by the GER. These facilities were limited and in 1901 four additional through down sidings were opened at West Ham followed in 1909 by a new facility at Little Ilford (just west of Barking). In 1912 a further eight new sidings opened at West Ham.

In 1911, the year before sale, the goods timetable consisted of 38 moves in and out of Little Ilford goods sidings, at least seven paths between Commercial Road and Tilury, and daily trips to Romford and local trips to Purfleet, Grays and Tilbury Dock sidings.

== Accidents and incidents ==
- Tilbury - 17 August 1859 - Derailment due to axle failure - one passenger killed.
- Barking 20 September 1859 - Rear end collision - two passengers killed,
- Upper Abbey Mills Junction - 6 December 1876 - collision between LT&SR and GER train due to poor signalling.
- Plaistow - 26 December 1881 - Driver error resulting in collision.
- Pitsea - 5 June 1897 - collision due to signalling error
- Woodgrange Park - 26 December 1897 - Collision in fog with Midland Train - signalling error

This list does not include accidents between Gas Factory Junction and Fenchurch Street as this was L&BR/ECR/GER owned. The Fenchurch Street railway station entry contains further incidents.

== Locomotives and rolling stock ==
=== Locomotives ===
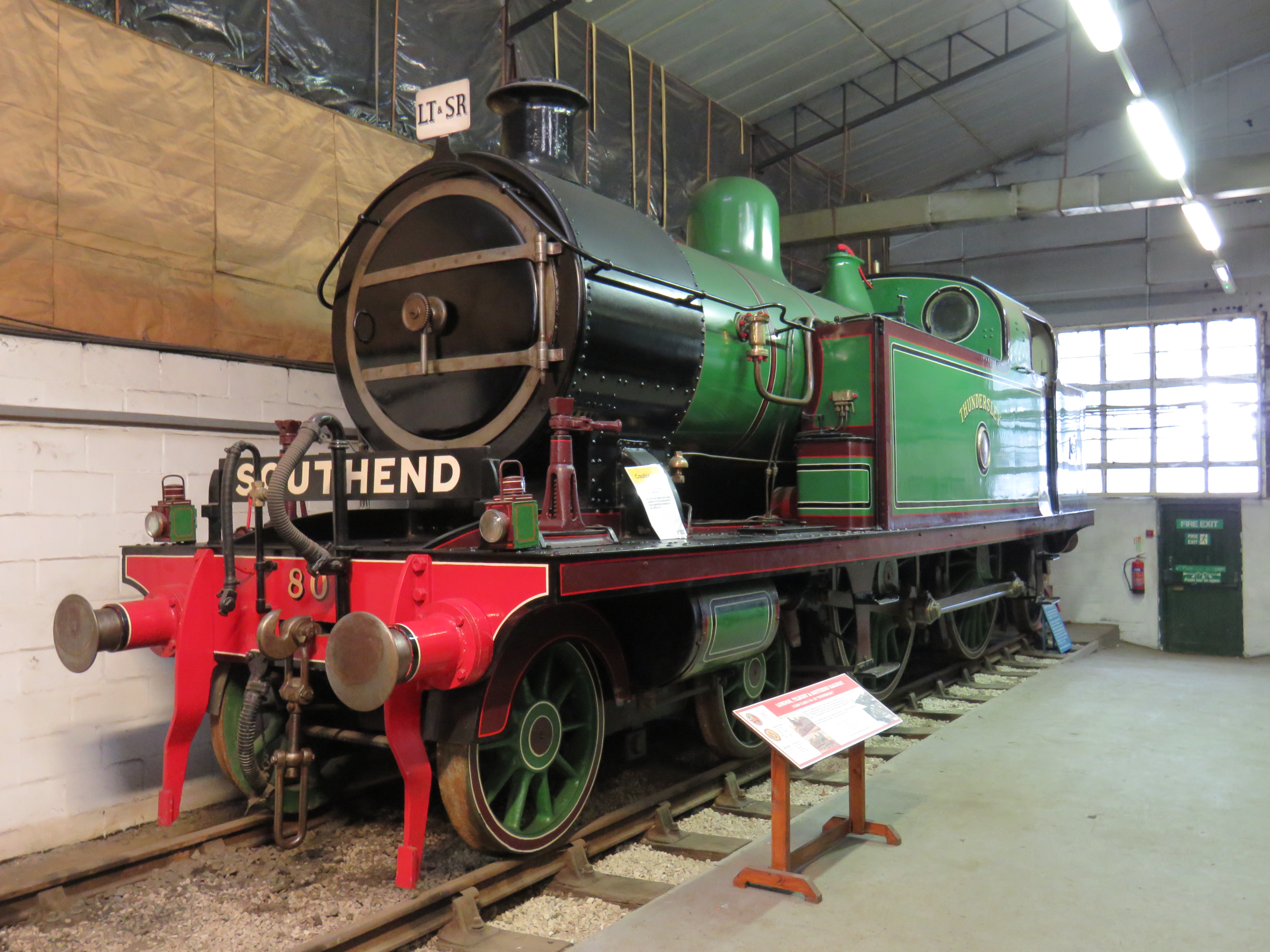
LTSR Thundersley No. 80 4-4-2T

The LT&SR initially used locomotives hired from the ECR and from 1862 the GER. These are detailed above in the Lessees section.

On 22 July 1879 the LT&SR ordered its first 12 locomotives from Sharp, Stewart and Company and the locomotive was delivered to Stratford Engine Shed in early April 1880. All 12 had been delivered by the end of July that year and hire from the GER largely ceased.

=== Coaching stock ===
In the early years of operation, carriages were leased from the ECR and from 1862 the Great Eastern Railway. On days where a number of special trains were run, North London coaching stock was hired in.

Once the LT&SR started to become a more independent concern they started ordering in more rolling stock partly driven by the fact the rolling stock it was using was the oldest in the capital. In 1875 70 new carriages were ordered from the Metropolitan Carriage & Wagon Company and these were delivered between May 1876 and February 1877. Unfortunately in 1878 a fire at Tilbury carriage shed led to the destruction of 12 carriages but in 1880 40 older coaches were bought from the North London Railway.

Hiring from the NLR and GER continued until 1891, when the NLR changed the way their trains were braked making interworking impossible. The LTSR ordered 60 additional carriages as a result and from 1897 hire from the GER was no longer possible for the same reason. After that date hiring was from the Midland Railway, mostly to cover Southend holiday traffic.

=== Wagons ===
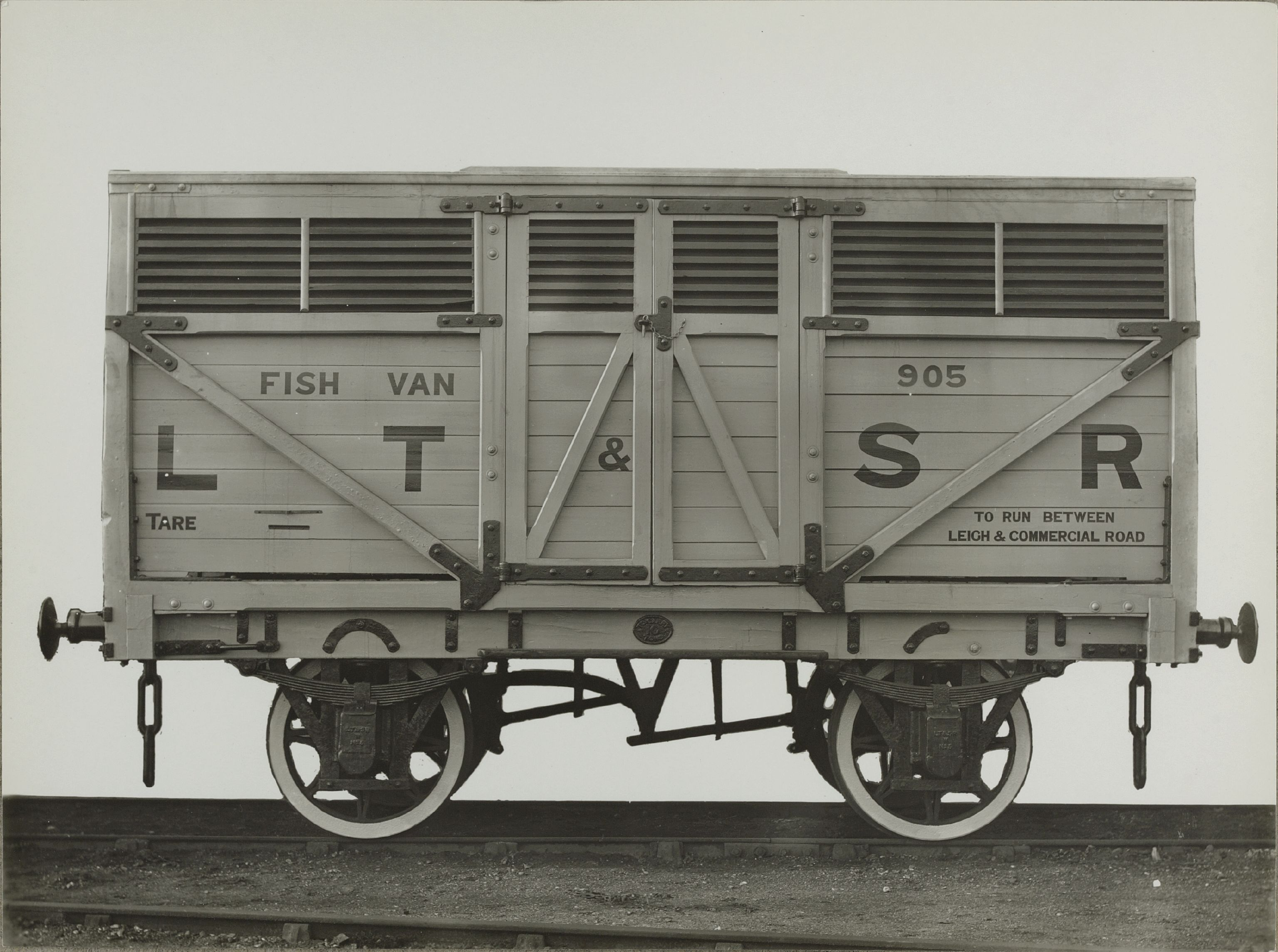
Fish Van, built 1904

The LT&SR was primarily a passenger railway although, in July 1876, they bought six vans for vegetable traffic and a further 100 open wagons from the Lancaster Carriage and Wagon Works. A further 50 open wagons and 10 brake vans were purchased from the Metropolitan Cammell Carriage and Wagon Company in 1879 and then 100 cattle vans were ordered to bring to an end reliance on hiring from the GER and NLR. Nevertheless, during its existence, 1794 freight wagons of various series were built.

=== Shipping ===
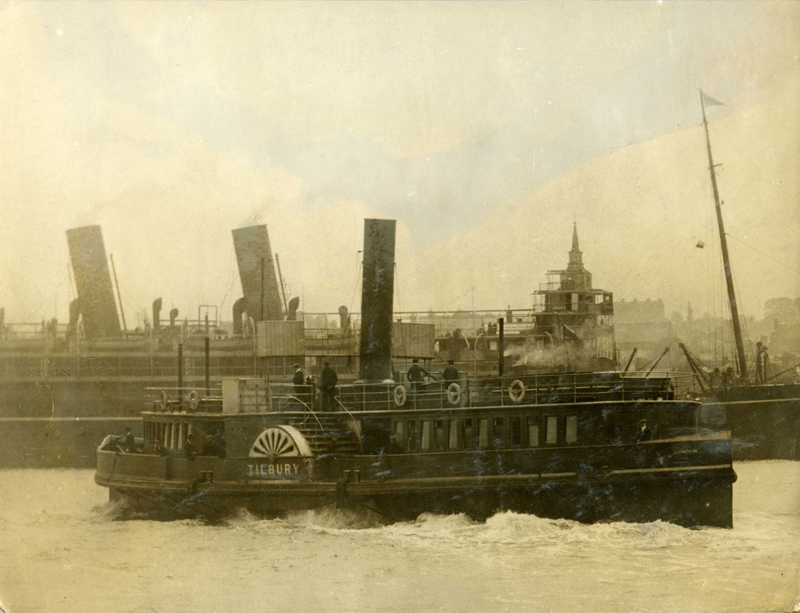
Tilbury ferry in 1883

Full details of the vessels operating the Gravesend to Tilbury ferries can be found in Gravesend–Tilbury Ferry.

Ferries operated to the following locations:

- Tilbury - Gravesend
- Thames Haven (later Tilbury) to Margate

== People ==
=== Arthur Stride ===
Stride was born in 1851 in Dover and spent his early career on the London, Chatham & Dover Railway in the engineers department. He joined the LT&SR in 1875 as General Manager and engineer. By October 1889 he became managing director (with a seat on the board) becoming deputy chairman in April 1905 and chairman in January 1906. In 1899 he shed some of his engineering responsibilities to J.R. Robertson and some of his general manager responsibilities to his promoted assistant Benjamin Bullock.

He was also on the board of the Whitechapel & Bow Railway as well as the Forest Gate & Tottenham Railway. He was on the board of the Metropolitan District Railway from 1902 to 1906 but conflicts of interest saw him resign that post.

Stride retired when the LT&SR was sold to the Midland Railway and died on 16 September 1922 at Hatfield in Hertfordshire.

=== Thomas Whitelegg ===
Thomas Whitelegg was born around 1836–7 in Manchester England,

He began his career as apprentice at the locomotive manufacturing firm Sharp, Stewart and Company in Manchester, later becoming a chargehand erector and engineer in that firm. Whitelegg would later erect a locomotive that was exhibited at the Manchester Exhibition of 1862. He later went on to work for Neilson and Company at their Glasgow factory.

His next appointment was at the Hamilton Windsor Ironworks in Garston, Liverpool, where he gained experience in marine engineering and the design of pontoons and piers. It was in Garston that his son Robert Harben Whitelegg was born. He then moved to the Ruston Proctor & Co in Lincoln, where he worked on the design of locomotives that were being built for the Great Eastern Railway (GER) and he subsequently joined the drawing office of the GER Works at Stratford, London where he remained until September 1879.

He was then appointed as the Locomotive Carriage & Wagon and Marine Superintendent for the London, Tilbury and Southend Railway at the Plaistow Works. He was the LT&SR's first locomotive superintendent - before 1875 the line had been worked by contractors Peto, Brassey and Betts. From 1875 until Whitelegg was appointed the LT&SR rolling stock was hired from the GER.

Whitelegg became known for his work on the highly successful outside cylinder 4-4-2T type tank locomotives known as “Tilbury tanks”. The original design of the locomotives was by William Adams, the first locomotives were supplied by Sharp, Stewart and Company in 1880 and were employed by the LT&SR as 1 Class. Whitelegg developed the design further and procured the 37, 51 and 79 Classes. The 79 Class locomotives could be used in a variety of ways as universal locomotives and could reach speeds of up to 65 mph (105 km/h) due to their large coupled wheels, which is why they were also used for express train services. The locomotives were so successful that the London, Midland and Scottish Railway (LMS) continued to build them until 1930, even though they were technically obsolete saturated steam locomotives.

Whitelegg retired in July 1910, and his son Robert succeeded him as the Locomotive, Carriage & Wagon Superintendent.

Whitelegg died at his home in Highgate village in London on 30 March 1911, aged 74.

=== Robert Harben Whitelegg ===
Born in 1873 and after education apprenticed to his father at Plaistow. After spending some time in Spain he returned to the UK and was appointed Works Manager at Plaistow. When Thomas retired in June 1910 he became Locomotive Superintendent, and in 1912 he designed a large 4-6-4T LT&SR 2100 Class and some coaching stock for the Ealing to Southend services. When the Midland Railway took over the LT&SR, Whitelegg was offered a subordinate post which he refused.

After spending some time in the agricultural engineering industry he became CME of the Glasgow & South Western Railway and later the manager of the Beyer, Peacock and Company in Manchester. He died in London in 1957.

== See also ==
- c2c, current train operators on routes built by the LT&SR
- London, Tilbury and Southend line, the modern railway line
