= East Ham Depot =

Railway depot in Newham, London, England

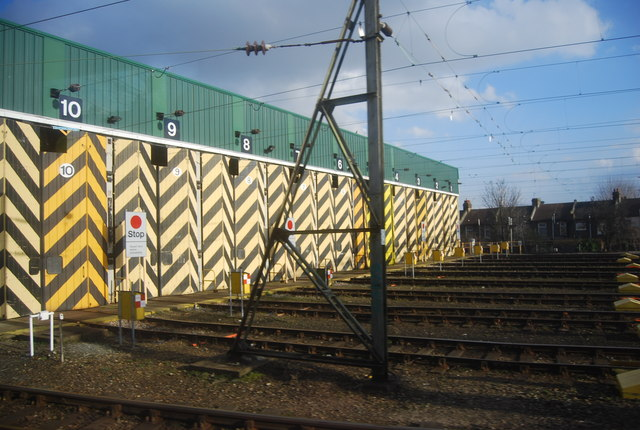
- East Ham Depot
- Interactive map of East Ham Depot

Location
- Location: East Ham, London, England
- Coordinates: 51.5431°N 0.0619°E
- OS grid: TQ429847

Characteristics
- Depot code: EM (1973-)
- Type: EMU

History
- BR region: Eastern Region

East Ham Depot is a depot on the London, Tilbury and Southend line between East Ham and Barking stations with the depot code EM. The depot is approximately 6 1/2 mi (10.5 km) from London Fenchurch Street station, and just west of the River Roding.

== History ==
=== Development of the Little Ilford site ===
The first railway in the area was the London Tilbury and Southend Railway’s (LT&SR) original route which ran from Forest Gate Junction (on the Eastern Counties Railway (ECR) main line) to Tilbury which opened in 1854. A more direct route from Barking to Fenchurch Street was opened in 1858 to avoid the congestion on the ECR main line through Stratford station.

A line called the East Ham loop was opened to the north and linked the LT&SR to Woodgrange Park which was on the newly opened Tottenham and Forest Gate Railway which opened in July 1894.

Other rail activity on the site did not take place until 1902. The opening of the Whitechapel and Bow Railway (a joint venture between the LT&SR) and the District Railway saw an increase of services between Bromley and East Ham where the District services terminated. Some sidings were opened on 31 May 1902 to allow for overnight stabling of three District Line train sets which at this time were operated by steam locomotives.

The new District Railway services saw a big down turn on LT&SR train performance and with long-distance traffic rising, the decision was made to quadruple the line between Bromley and Barking. The lines used by the District Line services were subsequently electrified initially to East Ham in 1902 and eventually in 1905 to Barking. This led to a major rebuild of the lines in the little Ilford area and three sets of sidings were built. The Northern Sidings were for goods exchange traffic between the Great Eastern and Midland Railways and the LT&SR. With the separation of the long distance and District Line traffic, more District trains were able to run and the District line used the electrified Middle Sidings. This included a two car carriage shed. The expansion of more peak hour traffic saw a need for additional LT&SR sidings and these were the Southern Sidings. All three sets of sidings were accessible from both ends.

Between 1905 and 1908 Barking station was being rebuilt and it was in 1908 that District Line electric services extended to terminate there.

There were few changes to operations except that changes of operating company when the LT&SR was purchased by the Midland Railway in 1912. The Midland became part of the London Midland & Scottish Railway in 1923 and part of British Railways following nationalization in 1948.

=== Re-development (1958-1962) ===
Operation in the area continued until the 1950s when a number of schemes were to change operations in the area. These were:

- Electrification and re-signalling of the LTSR
- Operational separation of the LTSR and District Line
- Simplification of freight operations centred on Ripple Lane Marshalling Yard
- The rebuilding of Barking Station with a flyover for freight trains.

The spur to East Ham, which had been used by a small number of Tottenham and Forest Gate line services, was closed in 1958 (when the services were diverted to Barking). and the various yards in the Little Ilford area close and tracks re-aligned.

The new depot was constructed between summer 1959 and summer 1961 and fully opened to traffic on 6 November 1961 when electric trains formed of AM2 units started operating some services. Full electric services started operating the following June.

The District Line facility was replaced by a new facility at Upminster Depot.

== Layout ==
It lies between the Down Main (towards Barking and Shoeburyness) and Up Main (towards East Ham and London Fenchurch Street) railway lines between the two stations (East Ham and Barking). It is the main maintenance depot for the Essex Thameside franchise and is currently operated by c2c, working with Bombardier Transportation service technicians to maintain its fleet of 74 Class 357 and 12 Class 720 Electrostars and Aventras. It has an 11 road shed, 8 road sidings, and 27 sets of points.

Number 1 - 8 and 10 roads in the shed can hold 12 coaches, whereas 9 & 11 roads can hold 8 coaches. In the 4 balloon roads, 17 road can hold 8 coaches, and 18 - 20 roads can hold 12 coaches. In the yard, 12 & 13 roads can hold 8 coaches, whereas 15 & 16 roads can hold 12 coaches. The carriage wash road (outside the shed's inlet and exit toads) can hold 24 coaches, and is 6.35 miles from London Fenchurch Street. The short 14 road is no longer in use. There is also an office and a traincrew depot on site, as well as the West End Shunters' Hut next to the Shed Exit Road, and an East End Shunters' Hut next to the east end set of points of the balloon roads.

== Maintenance ==
East Ham Depot won the Golden Spanner Award for Maintenance Team of the Year (Rolling Stock) at the Annual National Rail Awards in 2005 and 2006. This led to FM Rail choosing it as a base to clean and maintain its Mark 2 Blue Pullman train for a 12-month trial with an option to extend its stay indefinitely. Another factor leading to FM Rail's choice of East Ham over depots which would have been more convenient pathing wise such as Hornsey TMD or Ilford Depot may have been that East Ham had spare capacity and was therefore probably cheaper. When FM Rail was placed in administration in December 2006, it owed c2c about £40,000 and the Blue Pullman train and associated locomotives were bought by Cotswold Rail on 1 February 2007, who continued the maintenance contract with c2c at East Ham.

Class 86 electric locomotive 86212 was based at the depot to pre-heat the Mark 2 coaches of the Blue Pullman rake.

From 1996 to 2000, Class 317/1 units hired by LTS Rail from its sister Prism Rail franchise WAGN were maintained at East Ham Depot.

c2c maintains their fleet of Class 357 and Class 720s that came to service at September 2023 at the depot;

London Overground Class 172 Turbostar and Class 378 Capitalstar units have on occasions been stabled in the sidings of East Ham Depot.

== Accident ==
In December 2006, two Class 357 units, 357 002 and 357 043, were involved in a minor incident at East Ham Depot when one unit scraped down the side of the other. The damaged units, formed mostly of 357 002 with the driving car of 357 043, were used to form a hybrid unit which was renumbered 357 098 under the TOPS system and sent to Crewe Electric TMD for repairs.
