= British Rail Class 317 =

British electric passenger trains

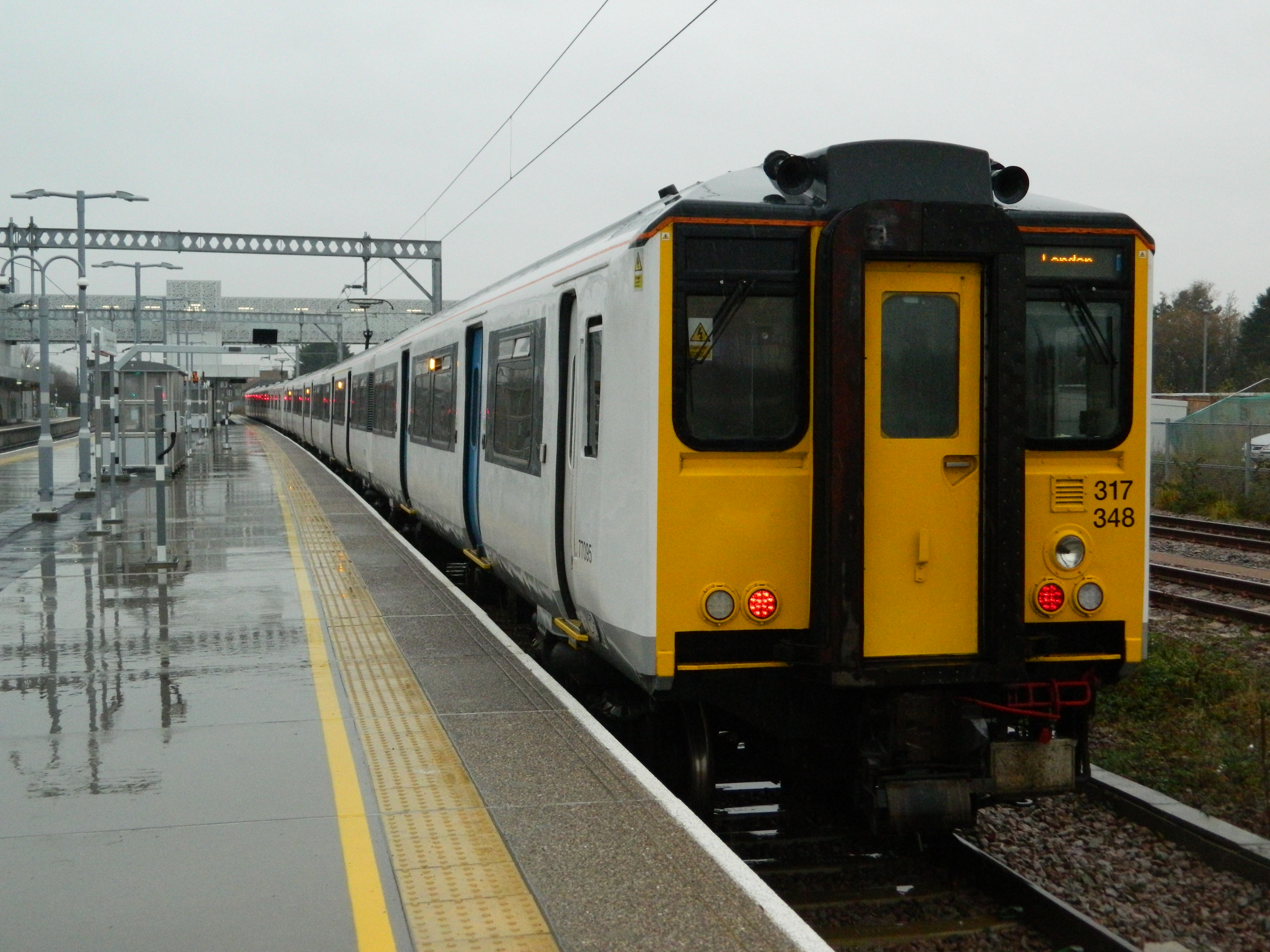
- Greater Anglia Class 317/1 at Cambridge North in 2017

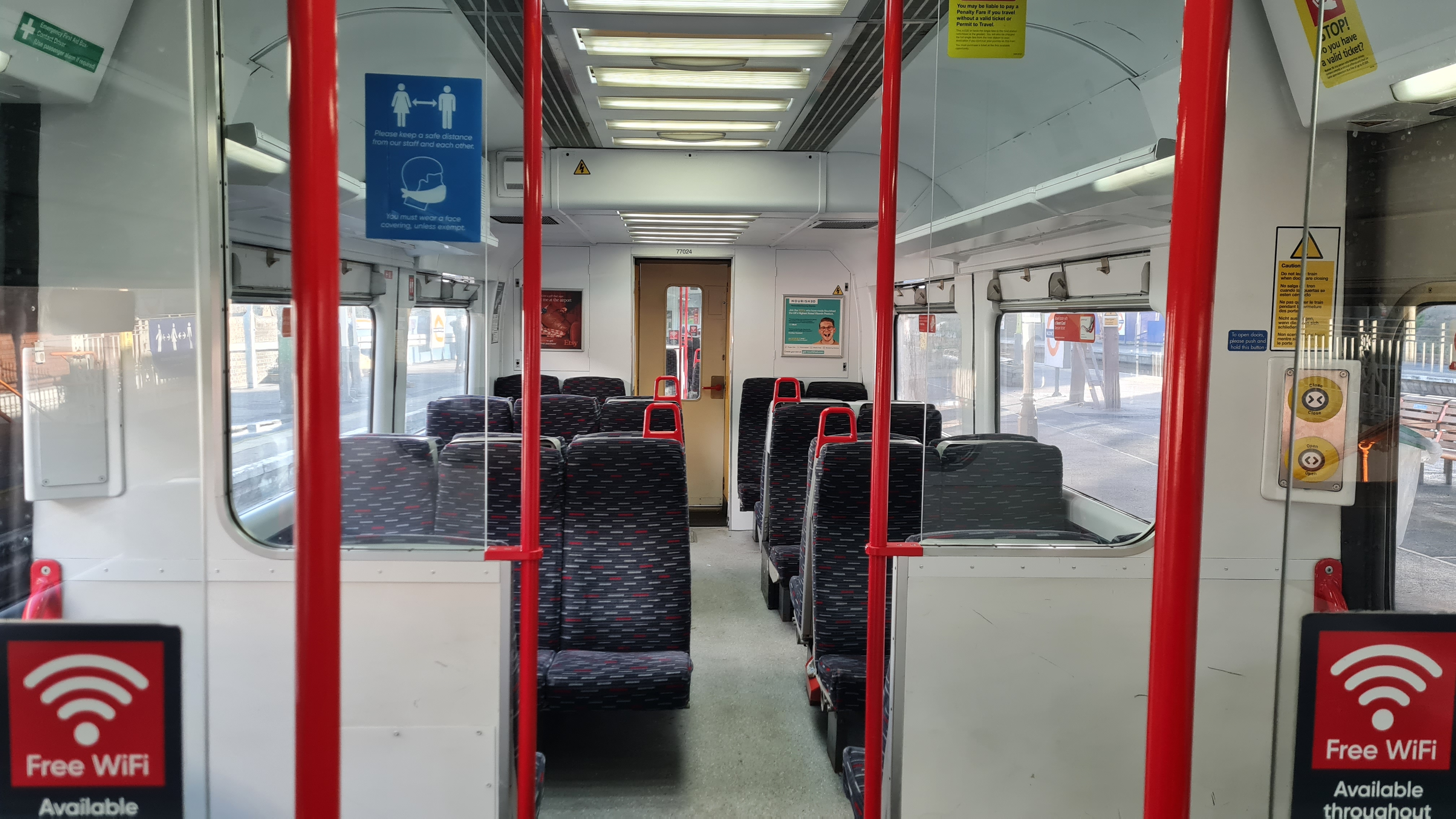
- Refurbished standard class interior of a Greater Anglia Class 317/5
- In service: 28 March 1983 – 16 July 2022
- Manufacturer: British Rail Engineering Limited
- Built at: Litchurch Lane Works, Derby (317/1 TCO bodyshells only); Holgate Road Works, York (remainder)
- Family name: BR Second Generation (Mark 3)
- Replaced: Class 127; Class 302; Class 310; Class 312; Class 322
- Constructed: 1981–1982; 1985–1987
- Refurbished: 2000–2006 (Stansted Express); 2006–2007 (First Capital Connect); 2013–2015 (Greater Anglia); 2015–2018 (London Overground)
- Scrapped: 2022 - 2024
- Number built: 72
- Number preserved: 2 vehicles
- Number scrapped: 72
- Successor: Class 357; Class 365; Class 379; Class 387; Class 710; Class 720
- Formation: 4 cars per unit; 317/6 units: DTSO-MSO-TSO-DTCO; All others: DTSO-MSO-TCO-DTSO
- Diagram: 317/1 DTSO vehicles: EE216, EE232, & EE235 (Note: Diagram EE232 describes a 71-seat variant used for Great Northern routes from 1986 onwards, while EE235 describes a 70-seat variant with a lockable area of the saloon adjacent to the driver's cab (for luggage, etc) used for services on the West Coast Main Line from 1986 onwards.); 317/1 MSO vehicles: EC202; 317/1 TCO vehicles: EH307; 317/2 DTSO vehicles: EE224 & EE225; 317/2 MSO vehicles: EC205; 317/2 TCO vehicles: EH308
- Fleet numbers: As built: 317/1: 317301–317348; 317/2: 317349–317372; Following renumberings: 317/1: 317337–317348; 317/5: 317501–317515; 317/6: 317649–317672; 317/7: 317708–317710, 317714, 317719, 317722–317723, 317729, 317732; 317/8: 317881–317892
- Capacity: As built: 292 seats (22 first-class, 270 standard)
- Operators: British Rail; c2c; Greater Anglia; Great Northern; First Capital Connect; London Overground; National Express East Anglia; Network SouthEast; Thameslink; West Anglia Great Northern

Specifications
- Car body construction: Steel
- Car length: DT vehs.: 19.830 m (65 ft 0.7 in); Others: 19.920 m (65 ft 4.3 in)
- Width: 2.816 m (9 ft 2.9 in)
- Height: 3.774 m (12 ft 4.6 in)
- Floor height: 1.144 m (3 ft 9.0 in)
- Doors: Double-leaf pocket sliding, each 1.010 m (3 ft 3.8 in) wide (2 per side per car)
- Wheelbase: Over bogie centres: 14.170 m (46 ft 5.9 in)
- Maximum speed: 100 mph (160 km/h)
- Weight: DTSO vehs.: 29.5 tonnes (29.0 long tons; 32.5 short tons); MSO vehs.: 49.0 tonnes (48.2 long tons; 54.0 short tons); TCO vehs.: 28.3 tonnes (27.9 long tons; 31.2 short tons)
- Traction motors: 4 × GEC G315BZ (248 kW (332 hp) each)
- Power output: 990 kW (1,328 hp)
- Electric system: 25 kV 50 Hz AC overhead
- Current collection: Pantograph
- UIC classification: 2′2′+Bo′Bo′+2′2′+2′2′
- Bogies: Powered: BREL BP20; Unpowered: BREL BT13
- Minimum turning radius: 70.4 m (231 ft 0 in)
- Braking systems: Electro-pneumatic (disc) (Westinghouse)
- Safety systems: AWS; TPWS
- Coupling system: Tightlock
- Multiple working: Within class
- Track gauge: 1,435 mm (4 ft 8 1/2 in) standard gauge

Notes/references
- Specifications as at November 1988, except where otherwise noted.

The British Rail Class 317 electric multiple unit (EMU) passenger trains were constructed by British Rail Engineering Limited in two batches: 48 sets were produced in 1981–1982 and 24 sets in 1985–1987. They were the first of several classes of British Rail EMU to be based on the all-steel Mark 3 bodyshell, departing from the PEP-aluminium design which had spawned the earlier Class 313 to Class 315, Class 507 and Class 508. The Mark 3 bodyshell was also the basis of Class 318, Class 455 and the diesel Class 150. The Class 317 uses overhead alternating current electrification. All units were withdrawn in July 2022.

== Description ==
=== Class 317/1 ===
The first batch of 48 units was built in 1981–1982 and was classified as Class 317/1. Units were numbered in the range 317301–317348, and had a maximum speed of 100 mph (160 km/h).

Each unit is composed of four vehicles: two unpowered standard-class vehicles with driver's cabs, an intermediate trailer with both first- and standard-class seating, and an intermediate motor vehicle with second-class seating. The motor vehicle also carries the roof-mounted Stone Faiveley AMBR pantograph.

The technical description of the formation of the units is DTSO(A)-MSO-TCO-DTSO(B). Individual vehicles were numbered in the following ranges:

- DTSO(A): 77000–77047
- MSO: 62661–62708
- TCO: 71577–71624
- DTSO(B): 77048–77095

Bodyshells for the TCO vehicles in this batch were constructed at Derby Litchurch Lane Works, while construction of the other bodyshells and overall assembly was carried out at the Holgate Road Carriage Works in York.

The units were built to operate services on the newly electrified London St Pancras to Bedford route and were due to replace the elderly Class 127 diesel multiple units in October 1982. However, their introduction was delayed until 28 March 1983 due to an industrial dispute with the unions over driver-only operation, and the diesel units lingered on until finally being replaced in mid-1983. Units were delivered in the standard livery of BR blue and grey.

In 1986, the route came under control of the Thameslink subsector of newly created Network SouthEast. From 1987, new dual-voltage Class 319 units were introduced on the route, allowing the creation of a new cross-London service, from Bedford to Brighton, via Farringdon and City Thameslink station. The Class 317 units were displaced to outer-suburban services on the WCML out of London Euston to Milton Keynes and Northampton. They replaced the slam-door Class 310 units, which subsequently transferred to the London, Tilbury and Southend railway.

However, the use of Class 317 units out of Euston again proved to be short-lived. In 1989, the second batch of new Class 321 were introduced onto WCML services. The Class 317 units were again displaced, this time to the Great Northern and West Anglia routes out of London King's Cross and London Liverpool Street, where they joined the second batch units. Therefore, for the first time, the entire Class 317 fleet was operating in the same place.

=== Class 317/2 ===
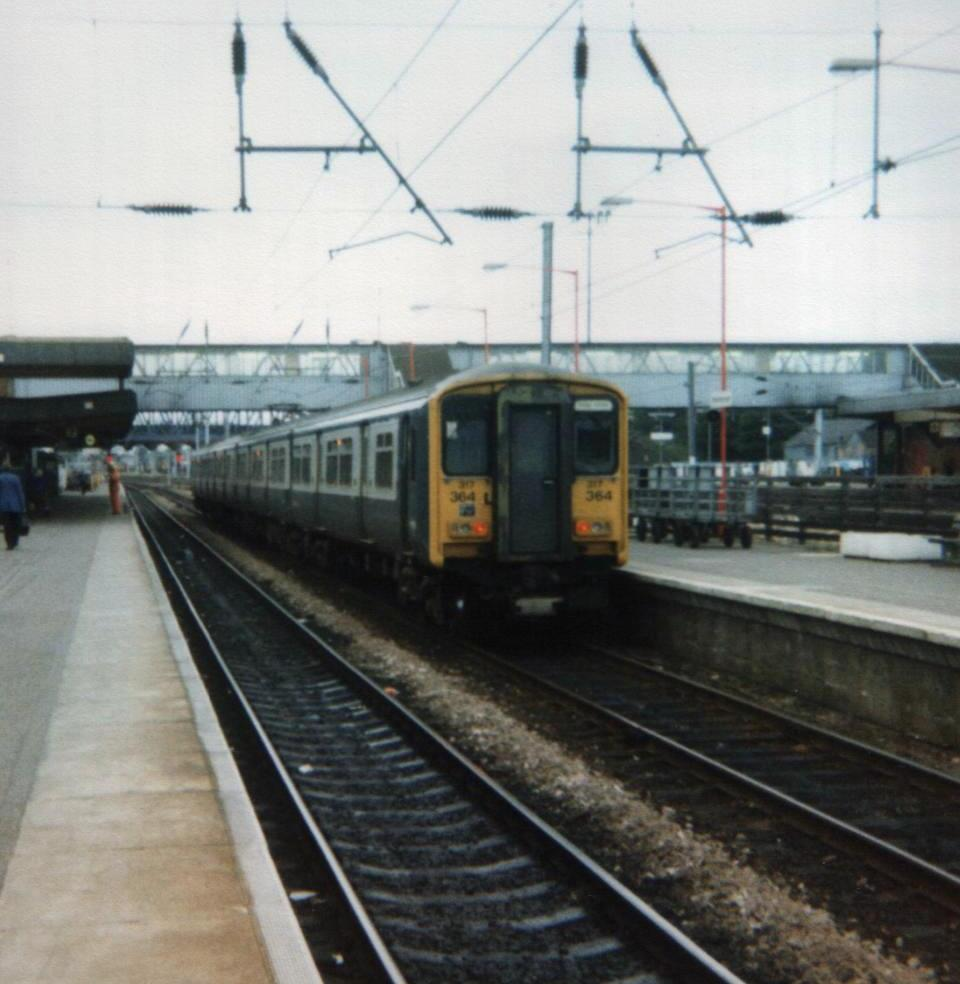
Class 317/2 in BR Blue and Grey livery at Peterborough

The second batch of 20 units was built in 1985–1986 and were classified as Class 317/2. Units were numbered in the range 317349–317368. A further four units were built in 1987 and numbered 317369–317372. These units have same DTSO(A)-MSO-TCO-DTSO(B) composition as Class 317/1 units, and have vehicles numbered in the following ranges:

- DTSO(A): 77200–77219 and 77280–77283
- MSO: 62846–62865 and 62886–62889
- TCO: 71734–71753 and 71762–71765
- DTSO(B): 77220–77239 and 77284–77287

All vehicles in this batch were constructed at Holgate Road Carriage Works.

The second batch units were built to operate outer-suburban trains on the Great Northern route from London King's Cross to Stevenage, Cambridge and Peterborough. Like the first batch units, they were delivered in BR Blue/Grey livery. The units replaced the slam-door Class 312 units, dating from 1975, which subsequently transferred to the Great Eastern Main Line and London-Tilbury-Southend routes. Like the DC Class 455 units, several aspects of the exterior were modified, with metal hopper ventilators replaced with larger panes of glass and the 'headcode indicator' flat front replaced with a rounded design.

In 1986, the route came under the control of the newly created Network SouthEast, which introduced a new blue, red and white livery. The extension of the overhead line equipment soon allowed the units to work services on the West Anglia route from London Liverpool Street to Cambridge. In 1992, electrification spread north from Cambridge to Ely and King's Lynn, allowing the replacement of locomotive-hauled trains.

The closely related Class 318 units, which were built for the Ayrshire Coast electrification in Scotland, are effectively a three-car version of the same design, but with a lower speed capability of 90 mph (140 km/h), and with traction motors provided by Brush instead of GEC.

== Operations ==
With the privatisation of Britain's railways, the Class 317 fleet was incorporated into the West Anglia Great Northern (WAGN) franchise. Since then, various changes occurred to the fleet, as units were swapped and franchises changed. The following companies operated Class 317s after privatisation.

=== Greater Anglia ===
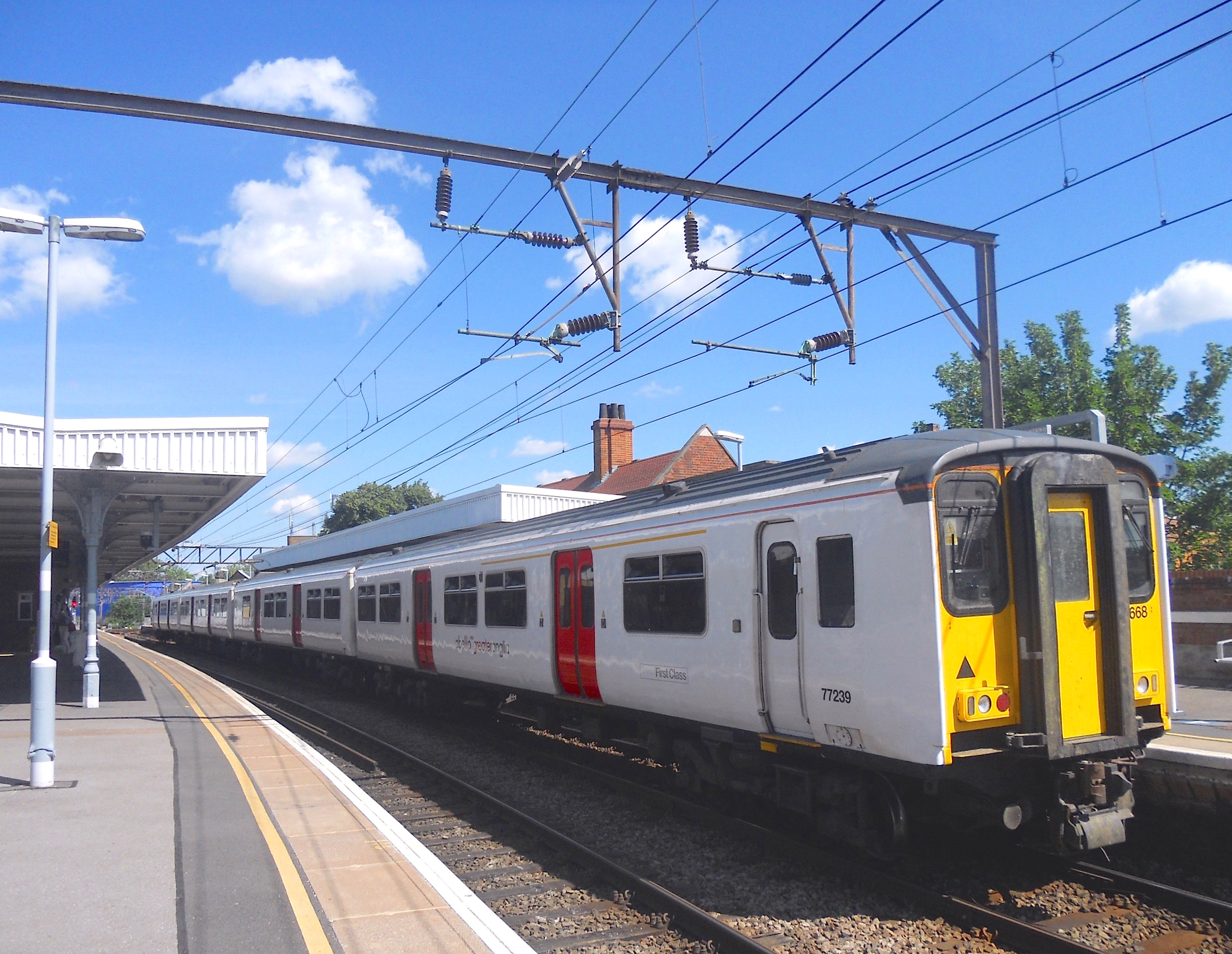
Greater Anglia Class 317/6 at Hackney Downs in 2015

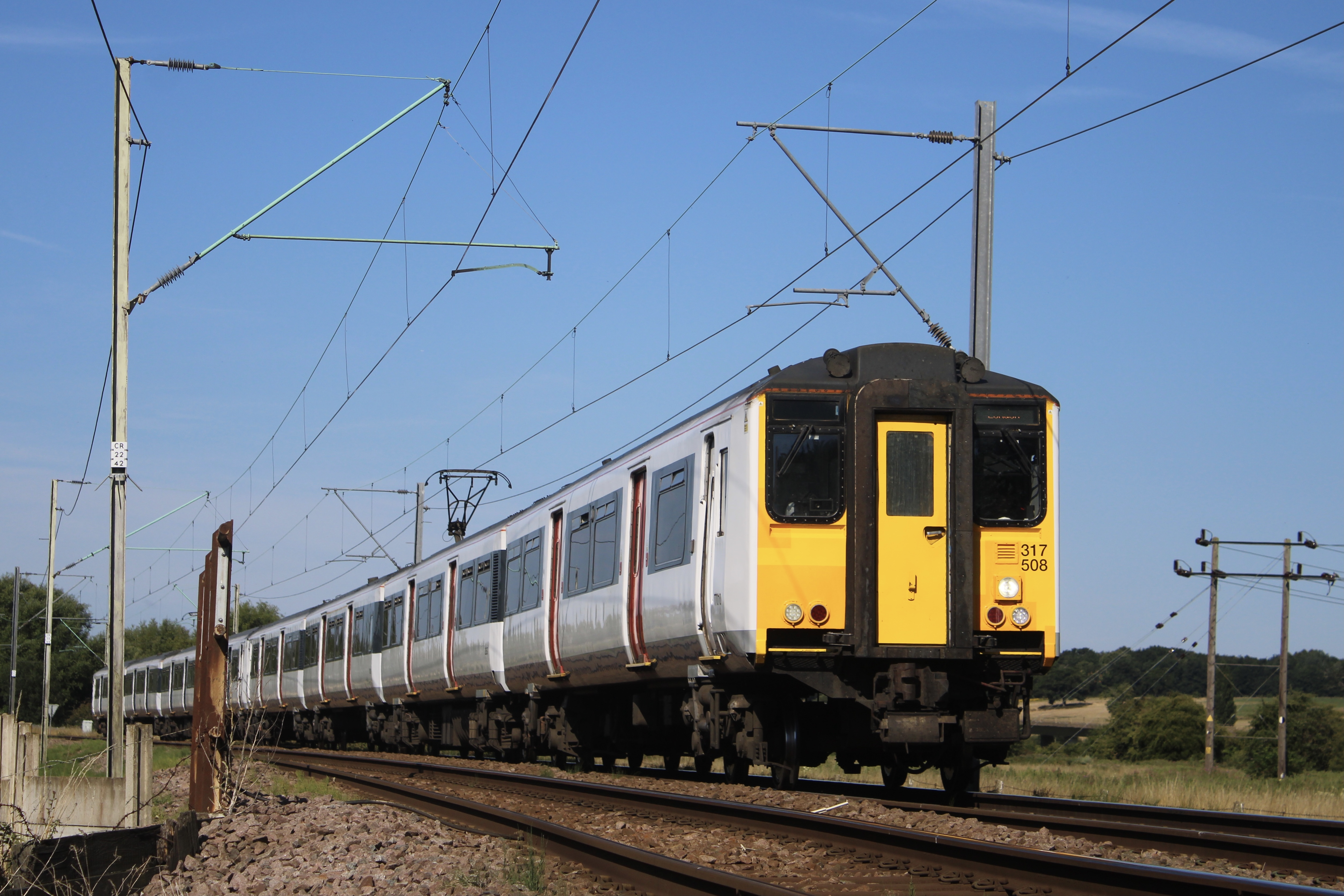
Greater Anglia Class 317/5 on 16 July 2022, the last day of scheduled working

Greater Anglia operated 15 Class 317/5 units, 24 Class 317/6 units, six Class 317/8 units and 12 Class 317/1 units, the last of which were transferred from Great Northern in 2017. They were mainly used on medium-distance services between London Liverpool Street / Stratford and Broxbourne / Hertford East and on longer distance services between London Liverpool Street/Stratford and Bishop's Stortford, Harlow Town and Cambridge. They were also used on some Bishops Stortford/Stansted Airport - Cambridge services. These trains were used on rush hour services from Liverpool Street to Witham and Ipswich while some class 321s were being refurbished. There was one class 317/7 demonstrator unit 317722. This unit has now been withdrawn and scrapped.

The fleet of 24 Class 317/6s were all refurbished with the following enhancements:

- New carpets in first class cabins
- New hard wearing, 'easy to clean' vinyl flooring in Standard Class accommodation
- All the seats were re-covered into new moquette trim
- Repainted grab rails
- New dado side panels and wall end coverings

After the Class 317/6 were refurbished, Greater Anglia then carried out an interior refresh to its 15 Class 317/5 trains.

During 2021, all Class 317/6 units were scrapped at Eastleigh works. Between 2019 - 2020, a few Class 317/1s units and 317/5s units were refurbished with the following enhancements:

- PRM accessible universal toilet (replacing the two passenger toilets)
- Call to aid buttons
- PRM door buttons
- Wheelchair spaces
- Improved free Wi-Fi

In addition, eight Class 317/7 units formerly operated by London Overground were brought back into use by Greater Anglia in 2020 as supplementary PRM-compliant units following the withdrawal of the 317/6 fleet.

The final scheduled Class 317 workings took place on 16 July 2022, with the last Class 317s withdrawn at the end of July 2022.

=== West Anglia Great Northern, First Capital Connect & Great Northern ===
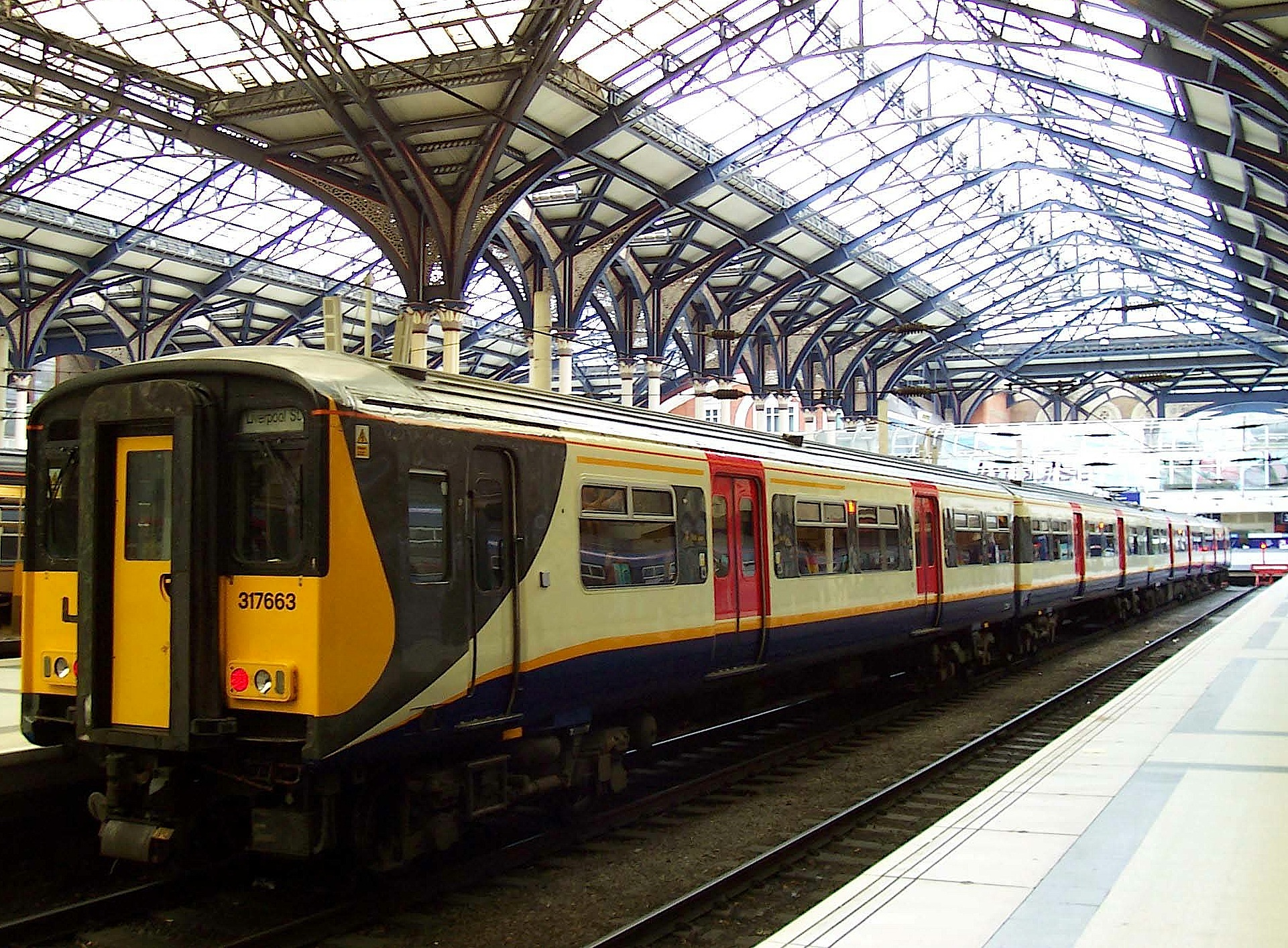
WAGN refurbished Class 317/6 at London Liverpool Street in 2006

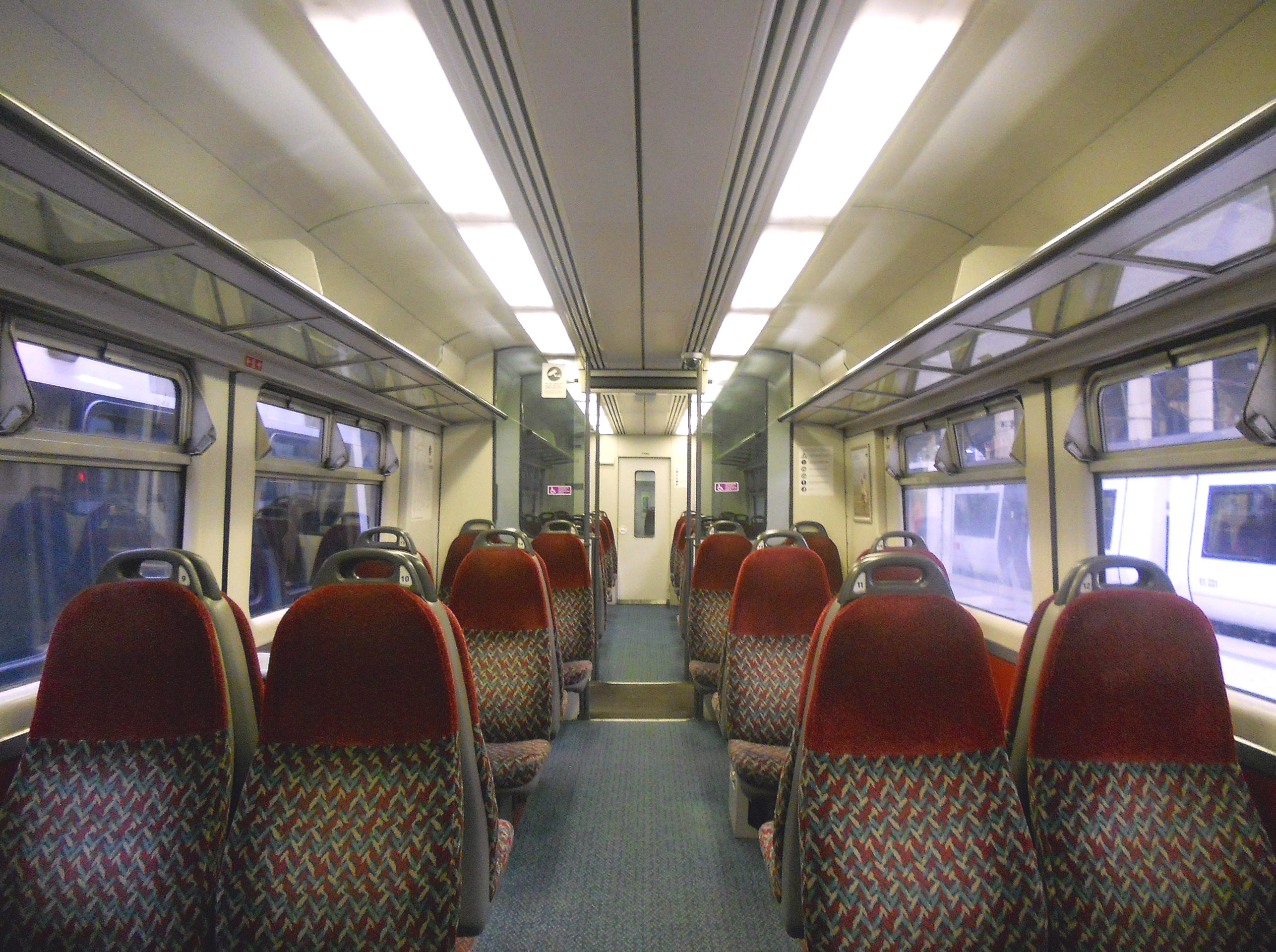
The interior of Standard Class aboard a refurbished Class 317/6

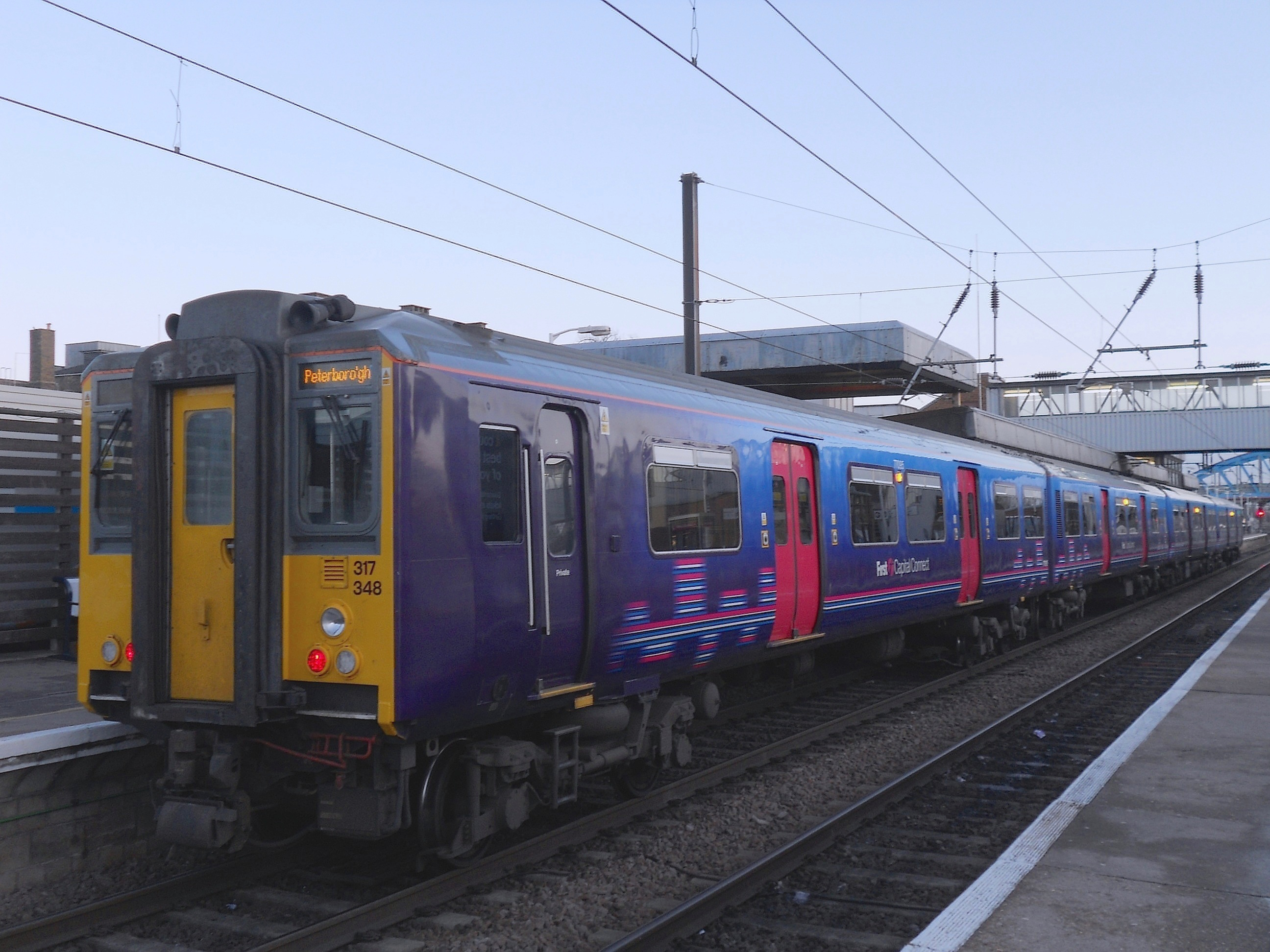
First Capital Connect Class 317/1 at Peterborough in 2012

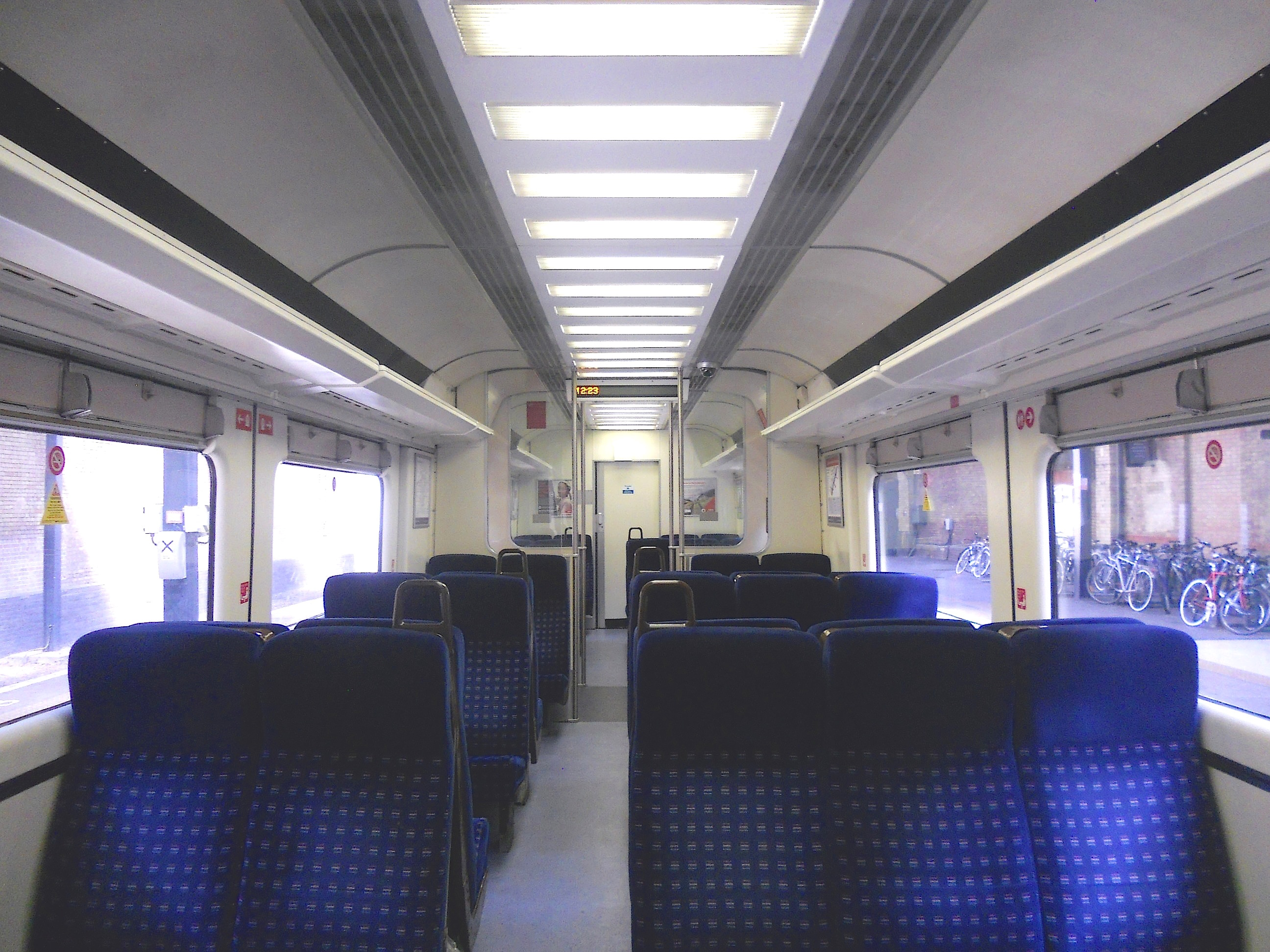
The interior of Standard Class aboard a First Capital Connect refreshed Class 317/1

WAGN Railway used the Class 317 fleet on various services, including all London Liverpool Street to Cambridge services on the West Anglia route, and many stopping services to intermediate destinations. The fleet also worked services on the Great Northern route, from London King's Cross to Cambridge, Peterborough, Hertford, Stevenage and King's Lynn, plus at weekends when the line to Moorgate was closed, the units operated inner suburban services from London King's Cross to Letchworth Garden City, Hertford and Welwyn Garden City.

In 1998/99, WAGN Railway started to refurbish its Class 317/2 fleet. The work was carried out by Railcare at Wolverton Works. The Stone Faiveley AMBR pantograph was replaced by the industry standard Brecknell Willis high speed pantograph. Units were reclassified as Class 317/6 and were renumbered into the range 317649–672.

Many of the WAGN Class 317/1 units still wore the Network SouthEast (NSE) blue and red livery dating from 1986. In 2001, a new livery of metallic purple with lilac doors was introduced. The first unit so treated was 317 312, which had recently returned from loan to LTS Rail. The livery was progressively applied to the Class 317/1 fleet, with the final NSE examples (317 328 & 317 345) disappearing by mid-2004. By April 2004, the only units not repainted were 317301–307, which were hired to Thameslink and remained in LTS livery. The WAGN purple livery was also applied to Class 313 and Class 315 EMU trains.

In April 2004, the WAGN franchise was split into the Great Northern and West Anglia routes. The latter became part of the new National Express East Anglia franchise, which operated under the title of One Railway. Great Northern was temporarily operated independently under the WAGN brand name, until it was merged with the Thameslink franchise in April 2006. These changes resulted in the Class 317 fleet being divided among First Capital Connect and National Express East Anglia.

First Capital Connect carried out a minor interior refresh to its 12 Class 317 EMU trains inherited from WAGN. Govia Thameslink Railway operated the 12 strong Class 317/1 fleet from when the new franchise began on 14 September 2014 until 21 May 2017 where they were replaced by the Class 387. These 12 Class 317 units were later transferred to Greater Anglia.

=== London Overground ===
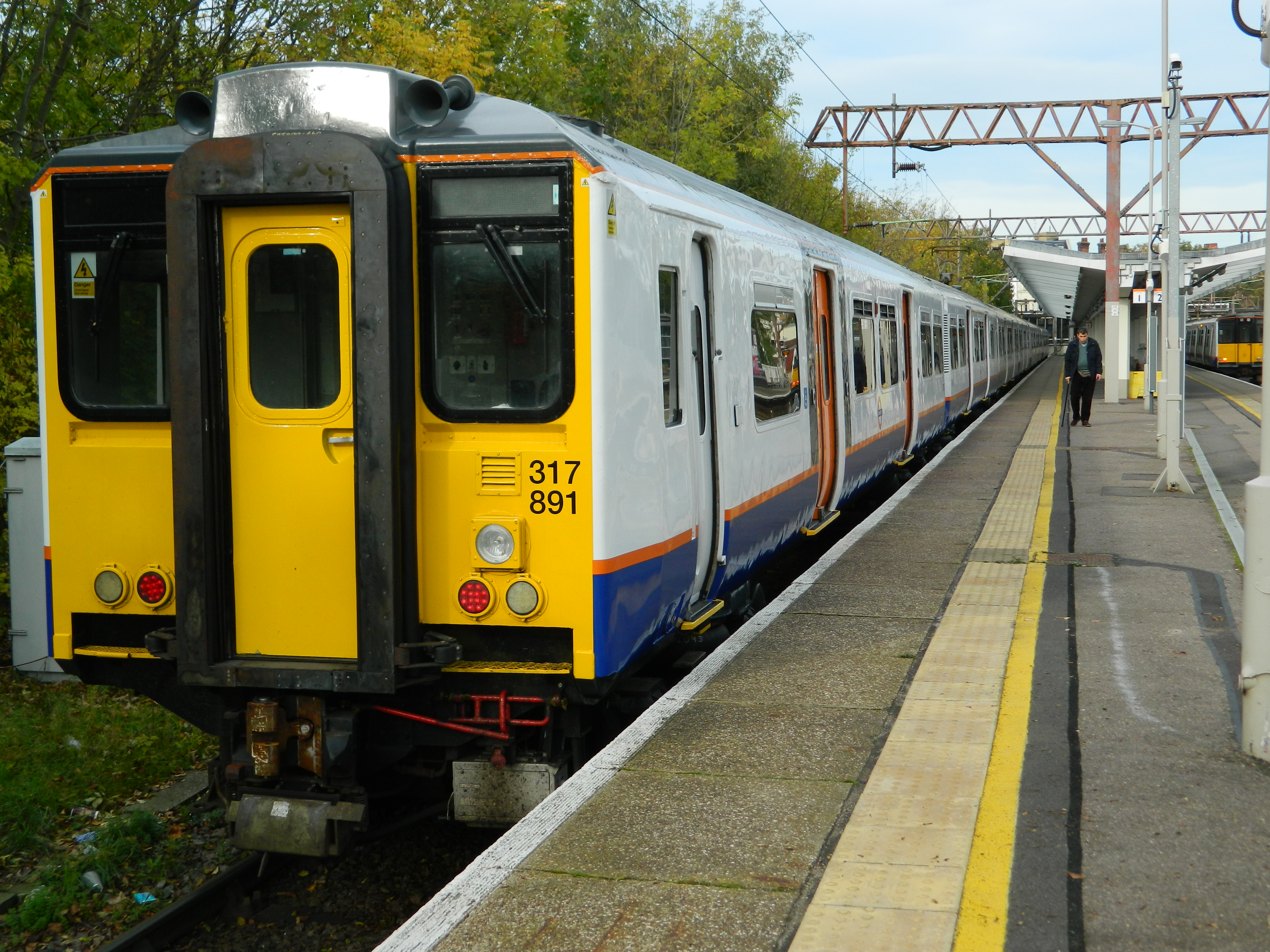
London Overground Class 317/8 at Enfield Town in 2017

On 31 May 2015, London Overground took over operation of the Liverpool Street to Chingford, Enfield Town and Cheshunt via Seven Sisters, using eight Class 317/7 units and six Class 317/8 units. All these trains had an exterior repaint, however not all were internally refurbished. They were all replaced by Class 710 "Aventra" in 2020.

=== LTS Rail & c2c ===
In 1996, LTS Rail (renamed c2c in 2000) began to hire Class 317/1 units from its sister Prism Rail franchise WAGN for use on the London, Tilbury and Southend railway. At first only two units were hired, but by mid-1997 this had increased to a total of 18 units. Units were maintained at LTS Rail's main East Ham Depot.

The Class 317 units enabled LTS Rail to replace the elderly Class 302 slam-door EMUs, the last examples of which were withdrawn in 1998. The Class 317 units also replaced some of the Class 310 fleet on off-peak workings, pending introduction of new Class 357 "Electrostar" units.

Many of the units hired to LTS Rail were repainted in a variation of the existing Network SouthEast blue, red and white livery. The red stripe was replaced with a green stripe, and both the blue band and green stripe extended to the cab ends.

The units were slowly returned to WAGN from 1999, with the introduction of the new "Electrostar" units. The last examples were returned by 2000. However, unreliability of the "Electrostars" meant that four units were still hired on a daily basis until 2002. These units were maintained as part of the main WAGN fleet, and therefore the specific units involved changed when units required maintenance at WAGN's Hornsey TMD depot.

=== Thameslink ===
In 2002, Thameslink began hiring four Class 317/1 units from WAGN to allow it to run additional Bedford to Moorgate services. Unlike when units were hired to LTS Rail, specific units were not involved. Instead, units were still maintained by WAGN and only hired for a fortnight. Two units each week were transferred in each direction, generally being hauled over the non-electrified route by two Class 31 locomotives provided by Fragonset Railways or Class 47 locomotives with barrier vehicles at either end of the Class 317.

In 2004, when the WAGN franchise was split, twelve Class 317/1 units were transferred to Thameslink from the Great Northern route. This was because a planned route blockade for engineering works meant that extra units were required for Bedford services. The Class 317 units were replaced on Great Northern by Class 365 "Networkers", themselves displaced from South Eastern Trains by new Class 375 "Electrostars".

The Class 317 units transferred to Thameslink were maintained at the newly built Bedford Cauldwell depot in Bedford. They were restricted to services on the Northern half of the franchise only, as only dual-voltage or DC units can operate South of Farringdon . All units were transferred to National Express East Anglia following the end of the blockade.

=== National Express East Anglia ===
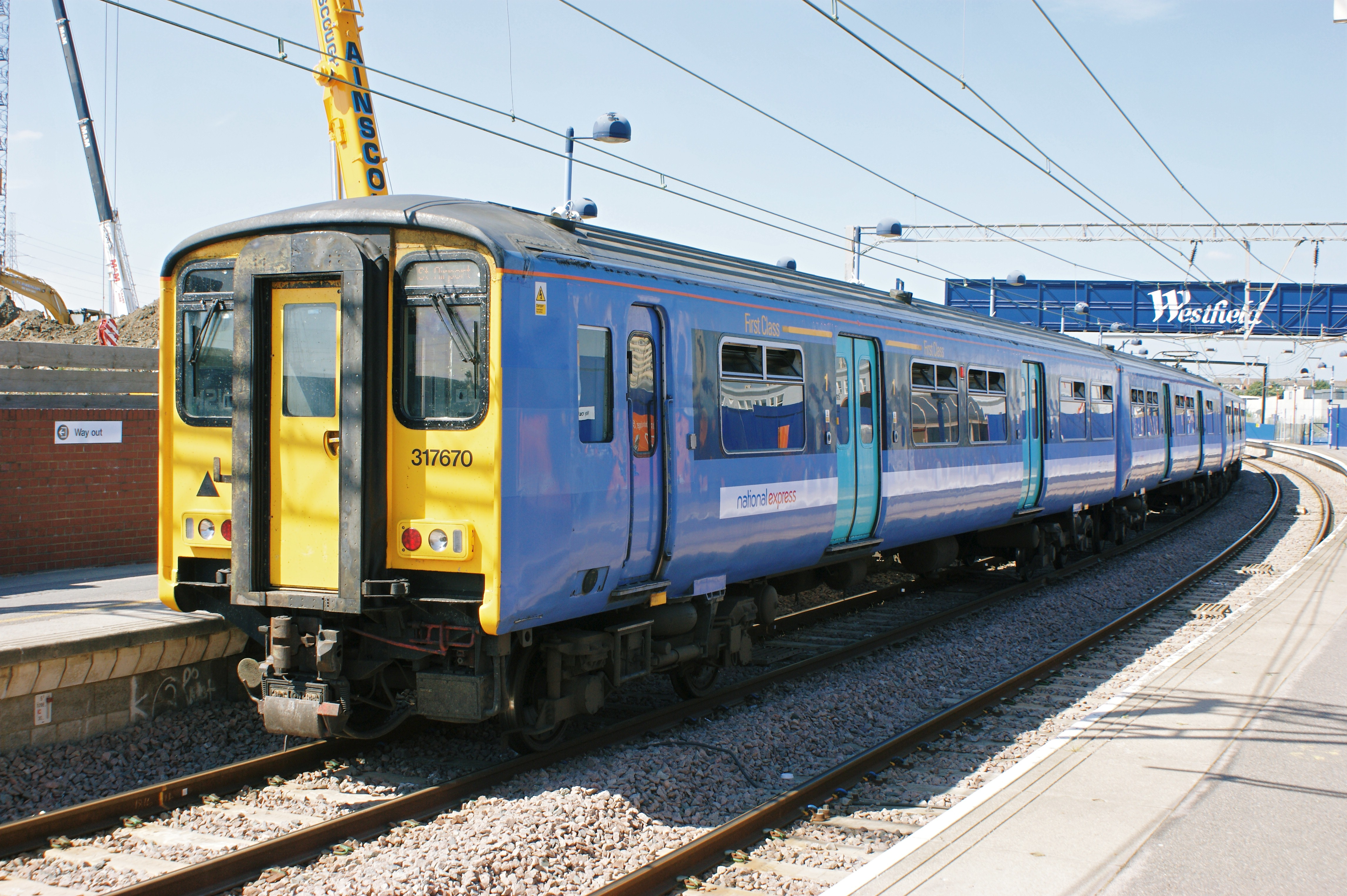
NXEA Class 317/6 at Stratford in 2008

On 1 April 2004, the West Anglia and Stansted Express routes became part of the new One franchise.

This was operated under the brand name 'one' until 26 February 2008, when it was rebranded as National Express East Anglia. During introduction, the units had one of six different liveries: the old WAGN white; a de-branded version of 'one' livery (minus the rainbow car ends); the same but with a white, National Express branded, stripe; three different Stansted Express liveries and the new National Express corporate scheme, similar to that of National Express East Coast and National Express Coaches.

==== Stansted Express ====
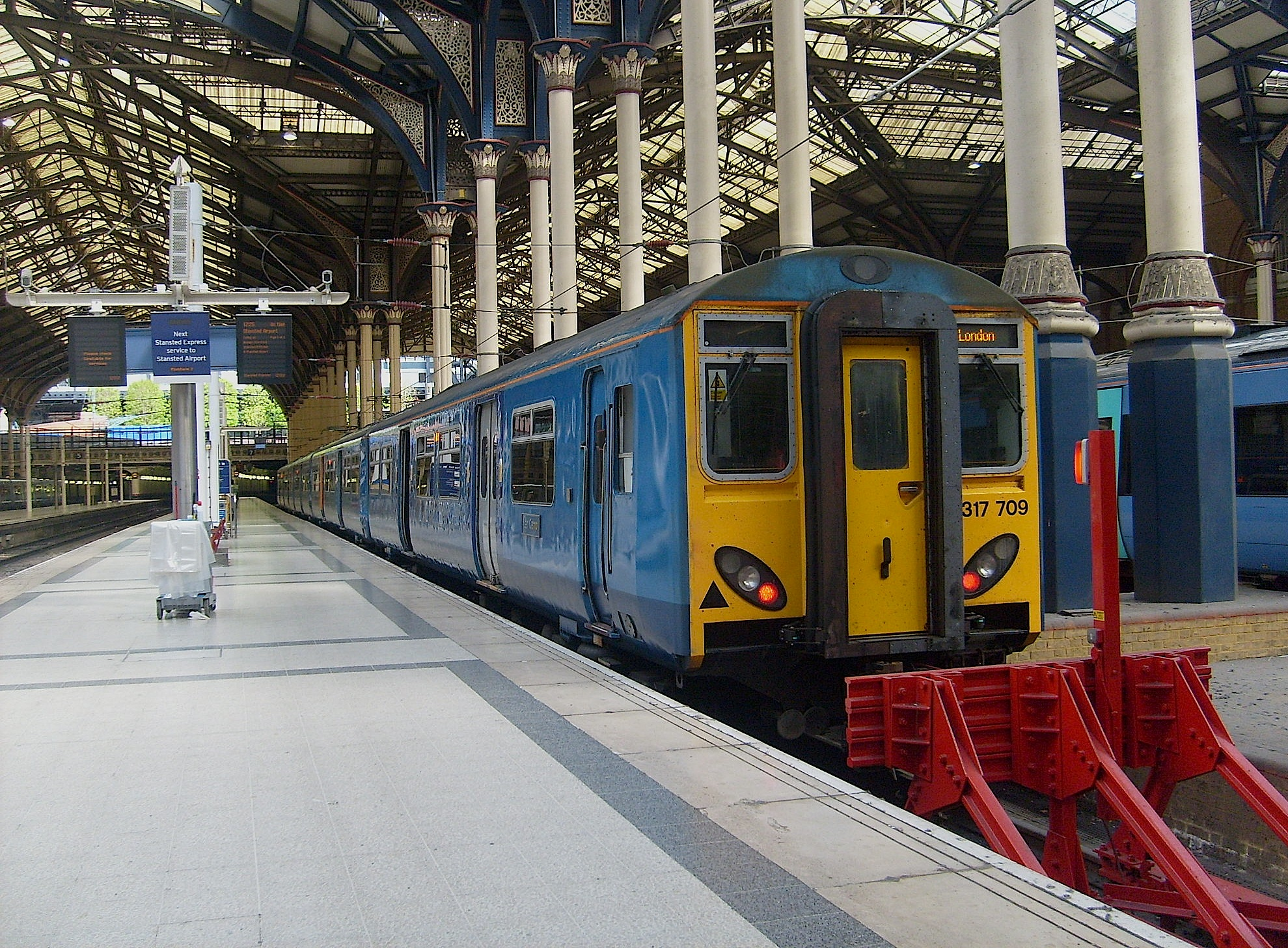
Stansted Express Class 317/7 at London Liverpool Street in 2005

In 2000, nine Class 317/1 units were selected to be refurbished for the dedicated Stansted Express service, from London Liverpool Street to Stansted Airport, replacing the previously dedicated Class 322 units. The work was again carried out by Railcare at Wolverton, and included the fitting of luggage racks and new window frames, identical to existing 317/2 units. The units also received a revised front end design, and a new metallic blue livery. The nine units were reclassified as Class 317/7, and were renumbered such that the last two digits of the set number remained unchanged. Some Class 317/7 units had their original Stone Faiveley AMBR pantograph replaced by the Brecknell Willis High Speed design.

In 2006 12 further Class 317 EMU trains were given a more basic refresh of new carpets, re-trimmed seats in new moquette and new dado side panels; by Wabtec Doncaster and the bodysides were painted in a lighter shade of blue than the Class 317/7. These units were reclassified as Class 317/8.

Both Classes 317/7 and 317/8 could occasionally be found working on West Anglia services and also it was not uncommon for Classes 317/5 and 317/6 units to work Stansted Express services alongside the dedicated Classes 317/7 and 317/8.

Following the arrivals of the new Class 379 units on Stansted Express services, the Class 317/7s and 317/8s were originally used alongside other Class 317s as a common pool. This changed when Abellio took over the East Anglia franchise on 5 February 2012, as the Class 317/7s were deemed too expensive to lease and surplus to requirements, and so they entered storage.

== Aborted proposals ==
=== Fitting of new traction equipment ===
At the end of the National Express East Anglia franchise, Angel Trains opted to use off-lease Class 317/7 unit 317722 as a test-bed unit and engaged Bombardier Transportation to rebuild it as a pre-series unit with new traction equipment. The DC motors, traction electronics and thyristors were removed, though the original transformer remained in place. The original bogies were modified to accept new AC motors, and three-phase converters fitted. Regenerative braking was also fitted.

At the same time, a £1 million interior refurbishment was carried out on two vehicles of the same unit - driving trailer standard open 77021 and motor standard open 62682. The interiors were refurbished in a Metro style layout and provided a direct contrast to the 3+2 and 2+2 seating in use on the remainder of the unit. Trials to test the reaction of passengers commenced with Greater Anglia in mid-2014. Trials were not particularly successful, and the unit was kept at Ilford for several years before being withdrawn in early 2019.

== Accidents and incidents ==
- On 4 February 2010, units 317505 and 317508 departed from Liverpool Street with all the doors open on one side of the train. The cause was that the train had entered service with the traction interlock switch isolated.
- On 17 September 2015, unit 317346 collided with the buffer stops at King's Cross at a speed of 7.5 miles per hour (12.1 km/h). Fourteen people were injured.

== Fleet details ==
Class	Status	Qty.	Year built	Cars per unit	Unit nos.	Notes
317/1	Preserved	–	1981–1982	4	DTSO 77092 and TCO 71621 from 317345	Originally Class 317/1
317/1	Scrapped	12	1981–1982	4	317337–317348	Originally Class 317/1
317/5	Scrapped	15	1981–1982	4	317501–317515	Originally Class 317/1
317/6	Scrapped	24	1985–1987	4	317649–317672	Originally Class 317/2
317/7	Scrapped	9	1981–1982	4	317708–317710, 317714, 317719, 317722–317723, 317729, 317732	Originally Class 317/1
317/8	Scrapped	12	1981–1982	4	317881-317892	Originally Class 317/1

=== Named units ===
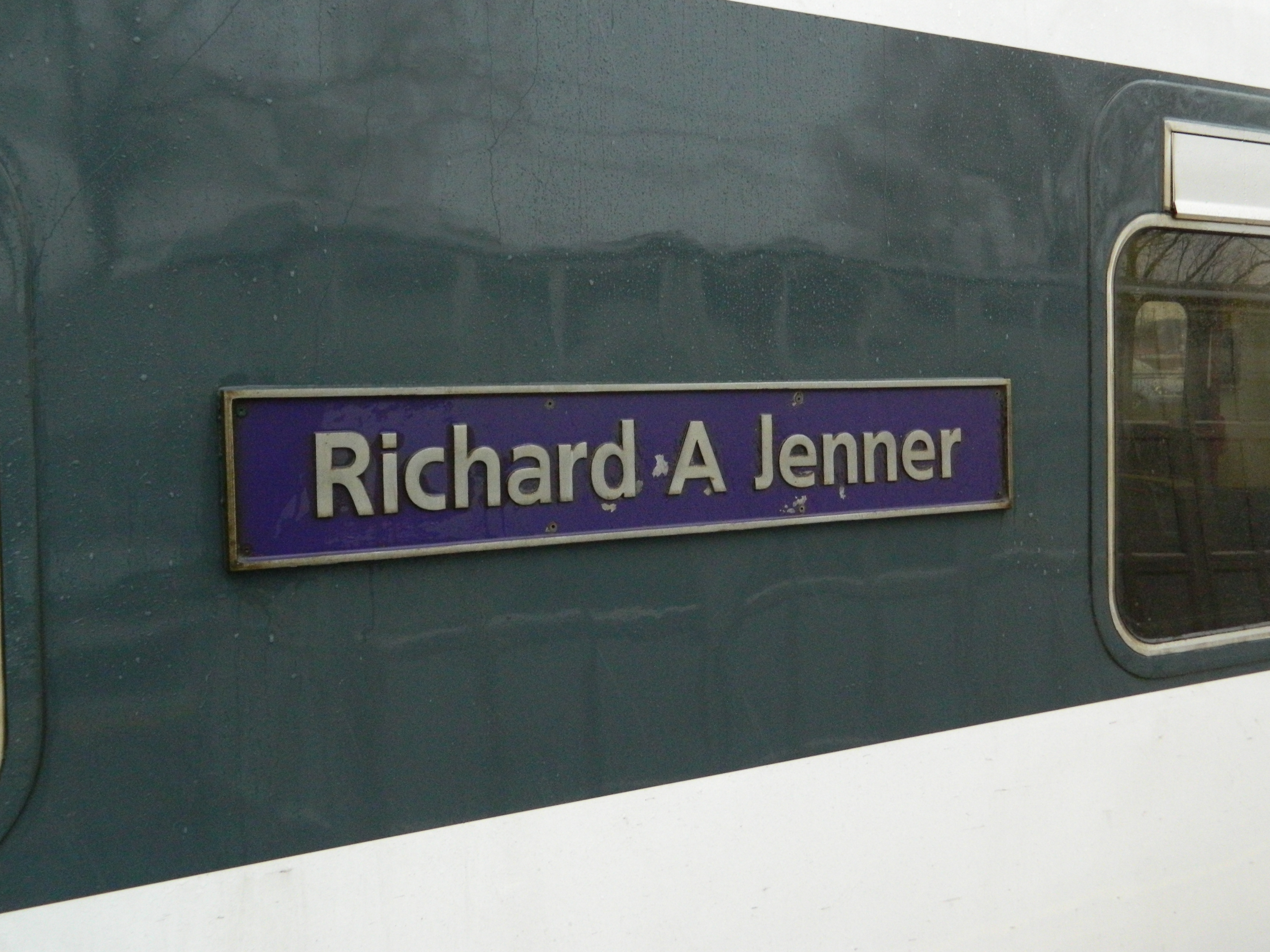
The nameplate on 317348

A number of units carried names these were as follows:

- 317345: Driver John Webb
- 317348: Richard A Jenner
- 317363: The Hatfield Comet
- 317370: Harlow 50 Years 1947-1997
- 317371: Stevenage New Town 50 Years - 1946 - 1996
- 317372: Welwyn Garden City Seventy Five Years
- 317507: University of Cambridge 800 Years 1209-2009
- 317654: Richard Wells
- 317709: Len Camp
- 317723: The Tottenham Flyer
- 317892: Ilford Depot

== Preservation ==
DTSO (Driving Trailer Standard Open) vehicle 77092 from unit 317345 is preserved at the East Anglian Railway Museum, and TCO (Trailer Composite Open) vehicle 71621 from the same unit is at The Depot in Caxton. The static display will show the history of both the Class 317 fleet and that of electrification in Anglia.
