= British Rail Class 357 =

Class of electric multiple unit built by Adtranz

British Rail Class 357 Electrostar
- A Class 357 at Limehouse in 2026

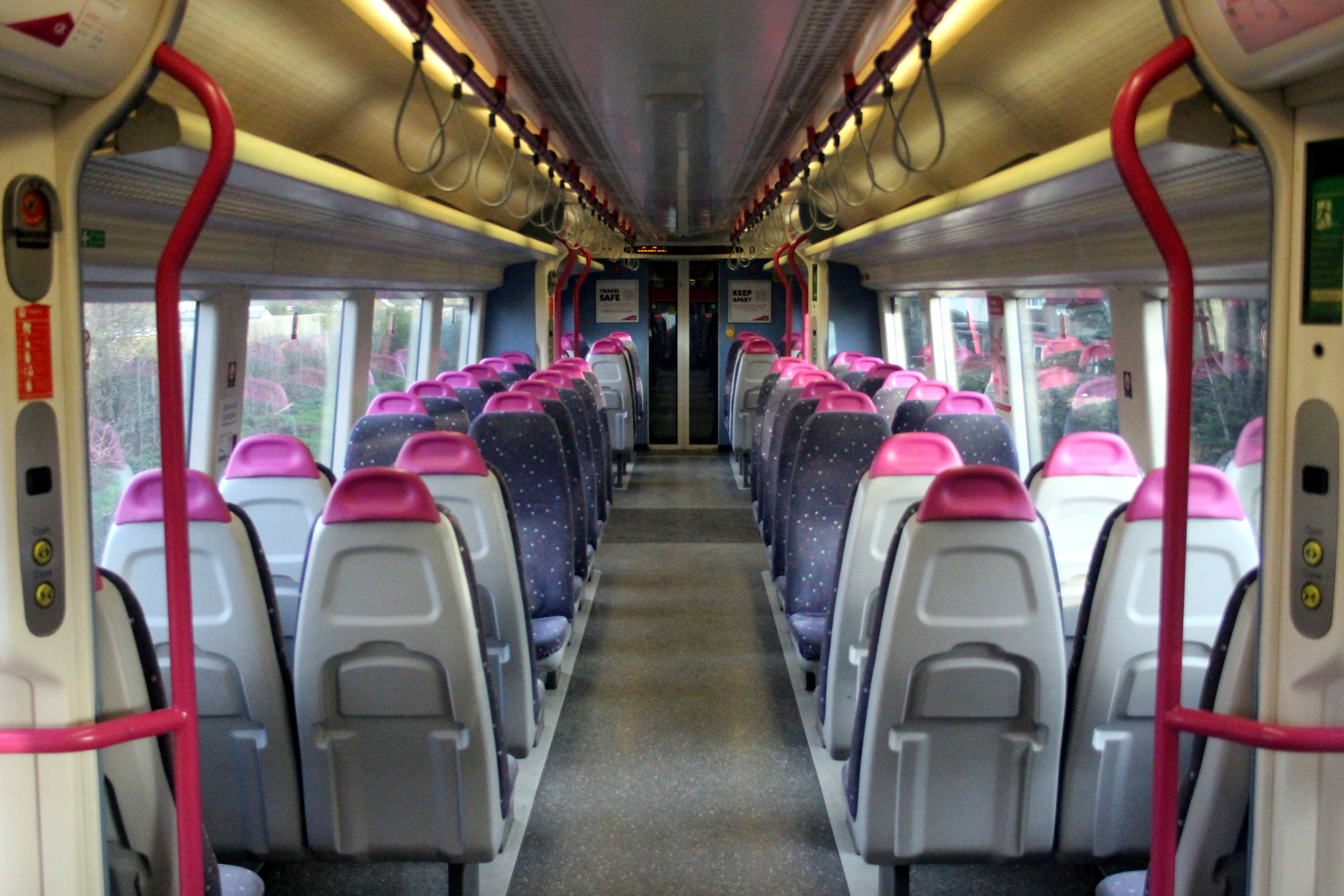
- The interior of a Class 357/3 in 2020
- In service: March 2000–present
- Manufacturers: Adtranz; Bombardier Transportation
- Built at: Derby Litchurch Lane Works
- Family name: Electrostar
- Replaced: Class 310; Class 312; Class 317
- Constructed: 1999–2002
- Number built: 74
- Formation: 4 cars per unit: DMSO-MSO-PTSO-DMSO
- Capacity: 357/0 and /2: 282 seats; 357/3: 222 seats
- Owners: 357/0: Porterbrook; 357/2 & /3: Angel Trains
- Operator: c2c

Specifications
- Car length: DMSO: 20.40 m (66 ft 11 in); MSO/PTSO: 19.99 m (65 ft 7 in)
- Width: 2.80 m (9 ft 2 in)
- Height: 3.78 m (12 ft 5 in)
- Maximum speed: 100 mph (160 km/h)
- Weight: DMSO vehs.: 40.7 t (40.1 LT; 44.9 ST); MSO vehs.: 36.7 t (36.1 LT; 40.5 ST); PTSO vehs.: 39.5 t (38.9 LT; 43.5 ST); Unit total: 157.6 t (155.1 LT; 173.7 ST)
- Traction motors: 6 × three-phase AC
- Power output: 1,500 kW (2,011 hp)
- Electric system: 25 kV 50 Hz AC Overhead lines
- Current collection: Pantograph
- Bogies: Powered: Adtranz P3-25; Unpowered: Adtranz T3-25
- Coupling system: Tightlock
- Track gauge: 1,435 mm (4 ft 8 1/2 in) standard gauge

Notes/references
- Sourced from unless otherwise noted.

The British Rail Class 357 Electrostar is a class of alternating current (AC) electric multiple unit (EMU) passenger train built by Adtranz until 2001, later Bombardier, at Derby Litchurch Lane Works between 1999 and 2002. They were delivered in two batches at a cost of approximately £292 million.

They are the first member of the Electrostar family, which also includes Classes 375, 376, 377, 378, 379 and 387. They have the same basic design, bodyshell and core structure as the Turbostar diesel multiple unit (DMU), which is in turn the most common post-privatisation diesel multiple unit family, and both evolved from the Class 168 Clubman design by Adtranz. The Class 357 fleet is operated by c2c on the London, Tilbury and Southend line.

== Description ==
The Clubman/Turbostar/Electrostar platform is a modular design, optimised for speedy manufacture and easy maintenance. It consists of an underframe, which is created by seam-welding a number of aluminium alloy extrusions, upon which bodyside panels are mounted followed by a single piece roof, again made from extruded sections. The car ends (cabs) are made from fibreglass and steel, and are Huck-bolted onto the main car bodies. Underframe components are collected in 'rafts', which are bolted into slots on the underframe extrusion. The mostly aluminium alloy body gives light weight to help acceleration and energy efficiency. Electrostar units have a shorter 20-metre-long (65 ft 7 in) version of the Turbostar's 23-metre-long (75 ft 6 in) body.

Class 357 units were built with 100 mph (161 km/h) capability, although the maximum line speed on the London, Tilbury and Southend line (the Essex Thameside franchise) is at present only 75 mph (121 km/h). They all have air conditioning, air suspension, CCTV, standard class 3+2 Chapman seating throughout, 28 computers, sliding plug doors, and rheostatic and air disc brakes, and now have regenerative capacity. As with all Electrostar units, they use insulated-gate bipolar transistor (IGBT) AC motor drives. They have Tightlock fully automatic couplers but are only interoperable within their own class with other Class 357 units. There are orange LED dot matrix displays at the front of each unit which show the time due at the destination and the name of the destination, e.g. "17.10 Shoeburyness", or "Not in Service" or "Empty to Depot" as necessary. The time due at the destination updates to the new time due if the train is delayed. There are also LED displays inside, at the end of each carriage above the gangway which give route and customer service information.

=== Class 357/0 ===
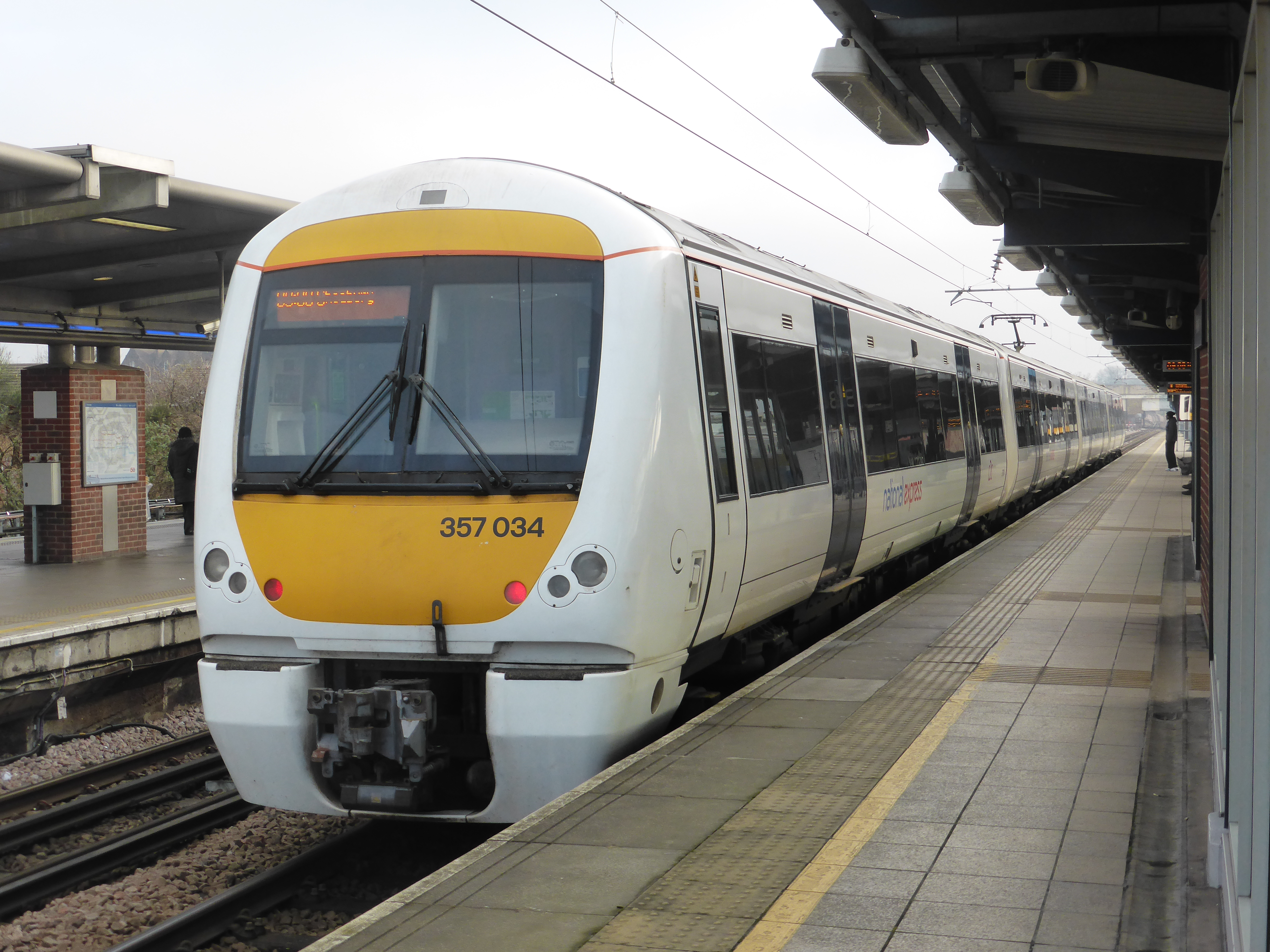
c2c Class 357/0 at West Ham

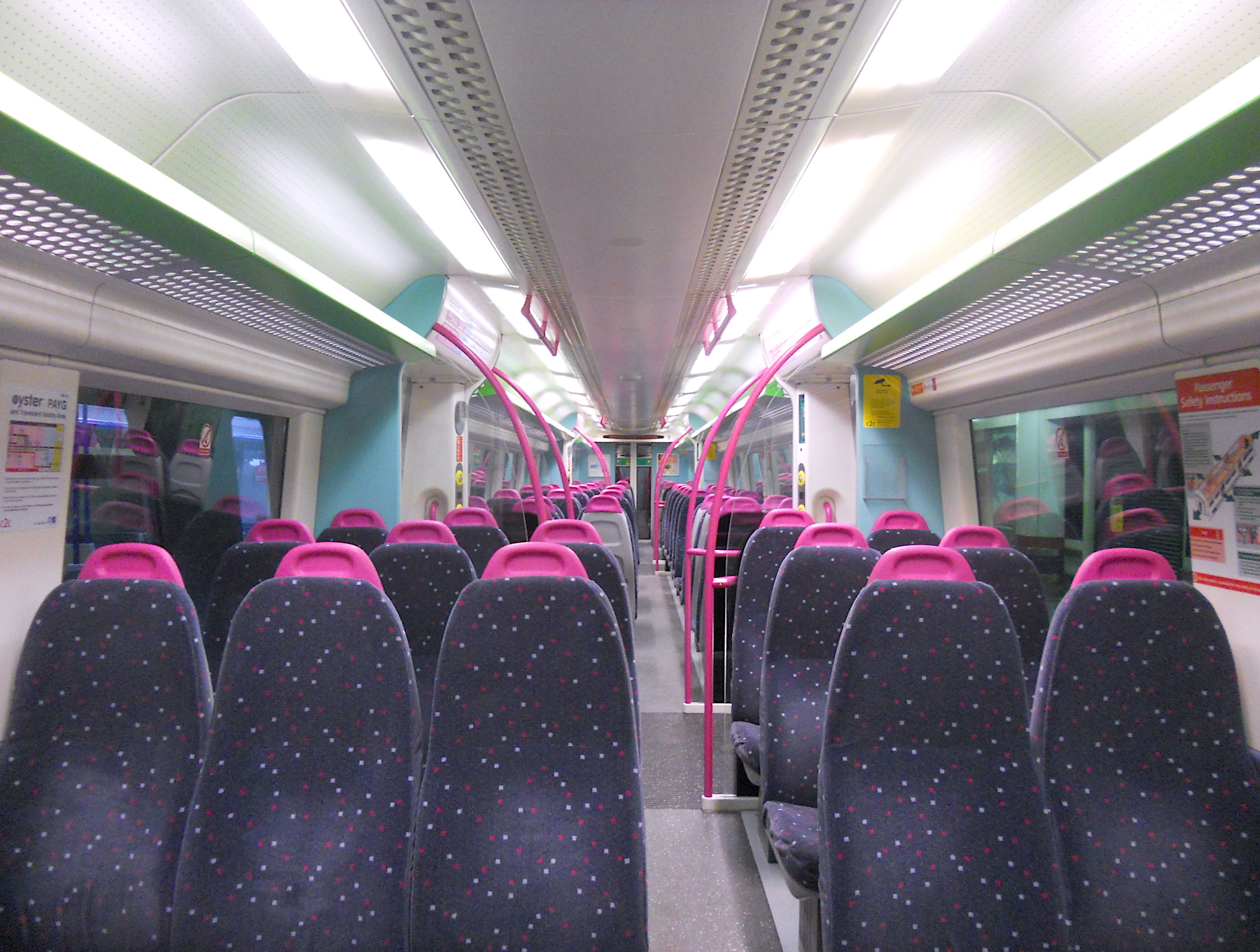
The refurbished interior aboard a Class 357/0

The first batch of 44 Class 357/0 units were ordered at a cost of £200 million by Prism Rail in March 1997 to replace the Class 310 slam-door units, and allow the return of 18 hired Class 317 sliding-door units to their other franchise West Anglia Great Northern. Construction started in 1999, and they are currently leased by c2c from Porterbrook. They were built in the green LTS Rail colour scheme, painted with a white livery with dark green doors and underskirt (bottom body panels). Their interior consists of dark green seat moquette with alternating rows of large flecks of light blue and light green, light green plastic seat tops with slots in the side for reservation tickets (which are not used) with dark green insets, a stone pattern linoleum floor, purple plastic interior, light green handrails and metal luggage racks with large circular perforations and light green edges, and dark green stickers on the inter-carriage gangway doors. The "door out of order" display is in between the interior door buttons, with the door close button above and the door open button below, unlike in the 357/2 units. These units were fitted with the voice of Julie Berry.

All 44 units were due to enter service by 1 November 1999, but were marred by late deliveries due to safety certification problems and reliability problems, resulting in the delivery of the units during 2000, and leading to their temporary withdrawal in October 2001. As a result, Bombardier built two further units free of charge, bringing the total to 46 units.

Units are formed of four vehicles, and are numbered in the range 357001–357046. Each unit is formed of two outer driving motors (each powered by two Adtranz asynchronous traction motors), an intermediate motor (powered by two Adtranz asynchronous traction motors), and an intermediate trailer. The technical description of the formation is Driving Motor Open Standard A (DMOS-A)+Motor Standard Open (MSO)+Pantograph Trailer Open Standard Lavatory (PTOSL)+Driving Motor Open Standard B (DMOS-B).

=== Class 357/2 ===
c2c Class 357/2 at Southend Central

Prism Rail was purchased by National Express in September 2000, and the franchise was rebranded as c2c once the Class 357/0 units were in service. The second batch of 28 Class 357/2 units were ordered at a cost of £92 million by c2c in 2000 primarily to replace the remaining Class 312 units. Construction started in 2001, and they were delivered between September 2001 and May 2002. They are owned by Angel Trains and leased by c2c, at an initial cost of £900 a day (including rental and maintenance). Due to the rebranding, they have a white livery with grey doors, and are internally branded to the c2c purple colour scheme with magenta handrails, magenta stickers on the inter-carriage gangway doors with c2c branding: "culture2club2commuters2culture2club2", and a light grey linoleum floor with white, dark grey and light purple flecks. The "door out of order" display is above the door close button, which is above the door open button, unlike in the 357/0 units. These units were fitted with DVA with the voice of Julie Berry.

The last slam-door units were withdrawn on 31 March 2003, resulting in c2c being the first train operating company (TOC) to replace its entire fleet with new trains.

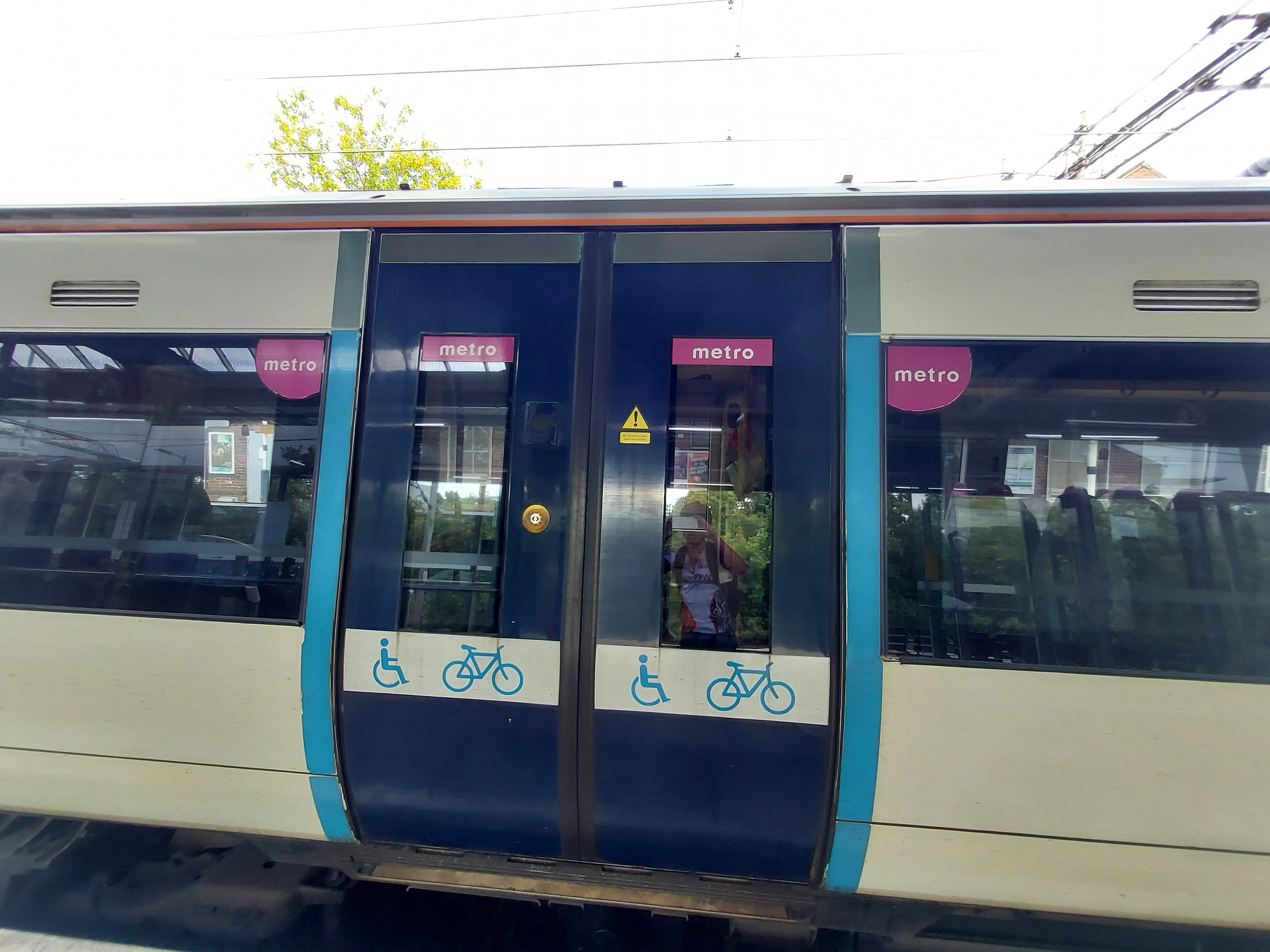
A 357/3 unit with metro stickers on the door and adjacent windows

The 357/2, have started to receive a refurbishment. This is almost identical to the 357/3, however there has been no seats removed and no grab handles fitted. A similar refurbishment will be placed onto the 357/0.

Units are currently numbered in the range 357201–357211. The formation of each four-car unit is identical to that of the Class 357/0 units. 357212-357228 have been converted to 357/3.

=== Class 357/3 ===
On 27 July 2015, unit 357323 was debuted by c2c in a revised configuration, with a wider aisle from 2+2 seating, instead of the common 3+2 arrangement. It also featured the 'refreshed' internal livery with pink back handles and grab handles in the gangway. They now feature pink "metro" stickers on the doors and windows adjacent to the doors.

== Livery, problems and maintenance ==
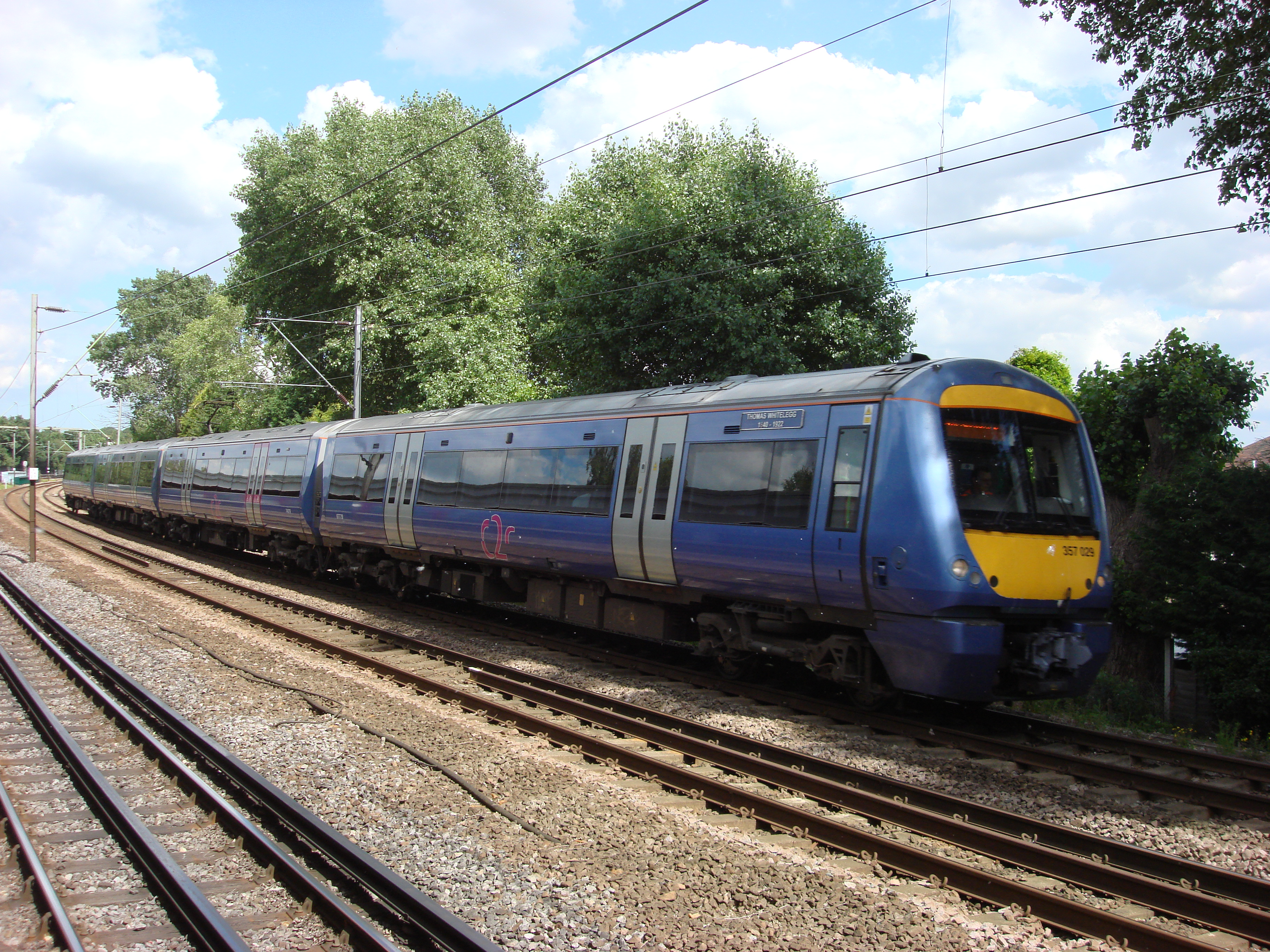
c2c Class 357 in the original metallic blue livery

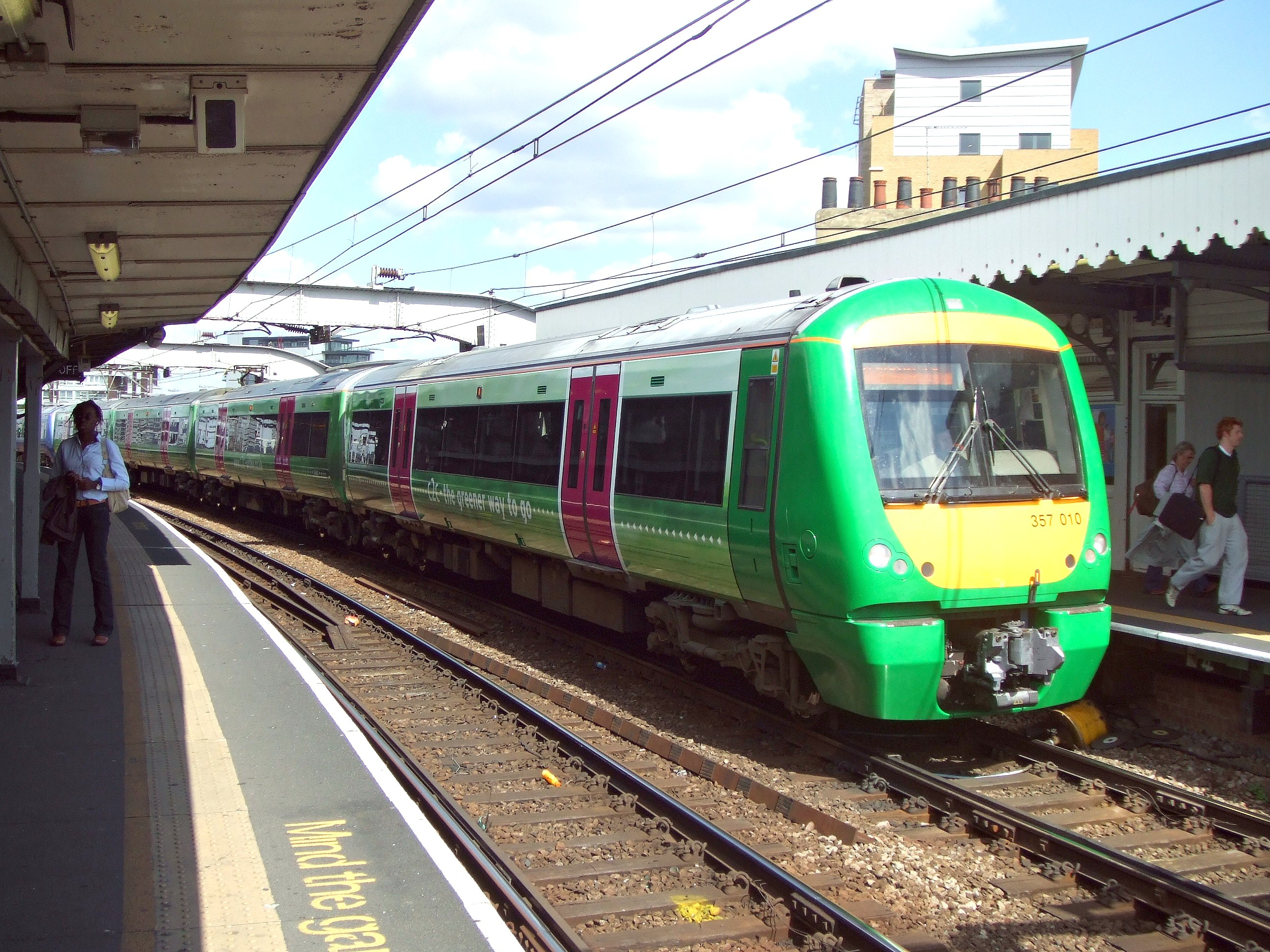
c2c Class 357 in a green livery, at Limehouse

In June 2001, units 357025 and 357027 had vinyl stickers applied with two prototype variants of the proposed purplish blue and magenta c2c livery at Bombardier's Derby Litchurch Lane Works. They were delivered to East Ham EMU Depot for evaluation. Each set of vinyl stickers cost about £40,000. Rollout of the new livery on the whole fleet began by mid-2002, and was completed over the next three months. Hence, although the underlying paintwork and interiors of the two sub-classes were different when delivered, their exterior appearance is identical, and the only way to distinguish them externally is by their numbering. When the Quiet Zone car was introduced in each set, this was marked on the exterior of the doors by a magenta and white sticker.

On 19 April 2004, the unusually large rate of increase in atmospheric pressure led to an airlock in the transformer oil system, causing the computer software to lower their pantographs; resulting in failure of eight Class 357 trains and causing service disruption. After their technical problems were sorted out, they have since been among the most reliable fleet of EMUs in the United Kingdom, winning Best Modern Era EMU at the Golden Spanners Awards from 2005 to 2007, for an average annual miles per casualty (MPC) figure of 43,180 in 2005, 37,391 in 2006, and 45,459 in 2007 (defined as the number of miles a train runs before a defect develops causing 5 minutes or longer delay).

The Class 357 units are all normally maintained by Alstom service technicians at c2c's East Ham Depot, which won the Golden Spanner Award for Maintenance Team of the Year (Rolling Stock) at the Annual National Rail Awards in 2005 and 2006 and their Shoeburyness depot.

In December 2005, c2c's East Ham depot began putting advertising vinyl wraps on some carriages, starting with branding the MSO intermediate trailer car 74716 in set 357216 as a 'Cough-Free Zone' by the cough syrup makers Benylin for the winter.

In June 2009, c2c and Bombardier began a repainting programme on the Class 357 units beginning with 357203. When the vinyl wraps were taken off the Class 357 units, slight corrosion caused by water getting trapped behind the vinyl was found in the aluminium around the doors, so a bodywork maintenance and repair programme was carried out. The corrosion was treated by rubbing the aluminium down and repainting it with two-pack paint. More serious corrosion caused by water seeping in through a poorly-sealed join between panels was found behind several panels on the lower part of the vehicle bodysides, which had spread to the outside. A thick, tight mastic seal was introduced between the panels to prevent this issue from re-occurring. To save money during construction, stainless steel bolts were used to secure the external aluminium panels in place; however, this resulted in galvanic corrosion of the more reactive aluminium, so the bolts have been replaced by aluminium ones. Salts in water catalyse corrosion, a problem for the c2c fleet as they run beside the sea.

After repair at Derby Litchurch Lane Works, 357203 was repainted and re-entered service on 30 July 2009. Similar work was carried out on the rest of the fleet over the next 21 months at Bombardier's Ilford Depot, where the units were repainted into their original white colour, but with dark blue doors, and branded with both "national express" and "c2c" logos in lower-case. The "Quiet Zone" stickers are now white with sky-blue lettering instead of magenta with white lettering. c2c ran a special "Farewell to the Blue Train" railtour service to commemorate the last day of running in passenger service of the blue livery on Saturday 5 March 2011.

Special liveries include unit 357318 which has a Pride livery for Southend Pride 2022, unit 357008 "going gold" for a Leigh-On-Sea based charity Gold Geese. The gold livery was unveiled on 1 September 2022 raising awareness for Childhood Cancer across the UK and Essex. In March 2023, unit 357016 was unveiled in a special livery for a partnership with the British Transport Police, to publicise their new App "Railway Guardian". The blue livery features QR codes leading customers to download the new app in order to help improve the safety for passengers travelling on the railway.

=== Regenerative braking ===
On 9 November 2006, unit 357028 was sent to the Velim railway test circuit in the Czech Republic for safety testing to obtain certification for a regenerative braking system which had been trialled for many months on the Class 357 fleet. In March 2007, 357028 returned from the Czech Republic, having gained safety certification, and c2c began fitting the regenerative braking systems to the rest of its Class 357 fleet, becoming the first UK train operator to do so. On 3 June 2007, the eve of World Environment Day, unit 357010 was given an all-over green vinyl sticker livery with magenta doors and the tagline: "All c2c trains are greener now – find out more at – www.c2c-online.co.uk – c2c – the greener way to go" to highlight the completion of the scheme, which has given energy savings of up to 21%. 357010 lost its green livery in March 2011 as part of the fleet's corrosion repair and repainting project.

=== Refresh ===
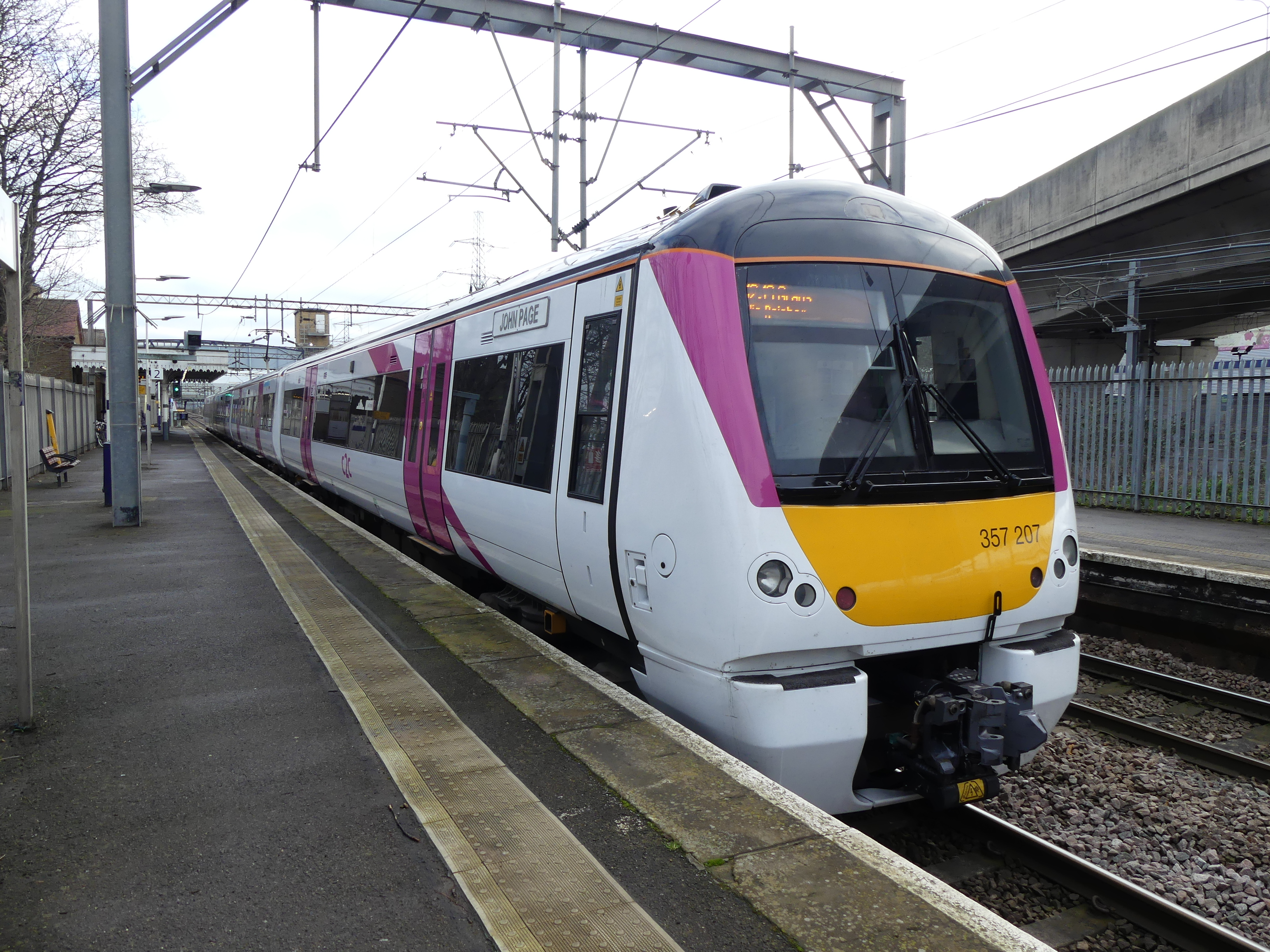
Refreshed train in 2025 at Dagenham Dock

On 15 May 2024 it was announced that Alstom would be painting and repairing c2c's class 357s over a 24-month period at their depot in Ilford.

The work includes the repair of huck bolt covers, body end corrosion, side vent corrosion, sole bar corrosion, roof corrosion and the repaint of all the units.

The first refreshed unit, 357207, entered into service on 10 December 2024. The programme is expected to take 24 months to complete, with each unit taking 20 days to complete.

== Operations ==
The two fleets of units are used interchangeably on all c2c services on the London, Tilbury and Southend line. Trains are generally formed of a single unit (4 cars) or two units (8 cars) working in multiple during off-peak times, and strengthened to two or three units (12 cars) during the morning and evening peak times. 71 of the 74 units are required to run the current normal timetable.

Five units were loaned to sister National Express operator National Express East Anglia (then branded 'one' Railway) for a period ending in 2006 to accommodate the transfer of three Class 321/3 units to Silverlink (themselves to cover for Class 321/4 units hired to Central Trains). The units were generally used on London Liverpool Street to Southend Victoria services on the Great Eastern Main Line (GEML).

=== On-board television trials and Wi-Fi ===
In January 2005, it was announced that an on-train television service would be trialled on unit 357014. The system consisted of six television screens and ten speakers in each carriage, and was also intended to be used to deliver real-time travel information. In June 2006 the '360 On-Board Television' service ran into financial difficulties when c2c's partners in the project, TNCI (UK), ceased trading, and the equipment was removed. c2c has indicated it will recommence the roll-out should a suitable partner be found for the scheme. The same unit, 357014, had Wi-Fi installed using equipment from Nomad Digital and T-Mobile, and tested for a little-publicised 6-month trial from 14 May 2007. The service was free to use during the trial. c2c have now fitted free Wi-Fi and an on-board streaming service to all of its fleet.

=== Quiet Zone ===
In October 2007, c2c announced that the country-end carriage of each unit (i.e. Shoeburyness end of the trains) would be made into a "Quiet Zone", where the use of mobile phones and personal audio players is prohibited. The "Quiet Zone" was introduced in early 2008 and is indicated by magenta and white stickers on the outside of the carriage doors and within the carriage. A trial was carried out to install special film onto the windows of the Quiet Zone carriages to block all mobile phone and Wi-Fi signals. The trial was not successful and the project was not continued.

== Accidents ==
On 5 November 2006 at about 00:30, 357043 hit a red Ford Escort which had come off the road and crashed through a boundary fence onto the railway line. The driver of the car had lost control off New Road near the junction with Laurel Close in Leigh-on-Sea. The driver of the car and its passengers left the car before it was hit a few minutes later by the train. A police officer at the site tried to flag the train down before it reached the car but, although the train had slowed before hitting the car, it pushed the car about 100 yards along the line. The train driver and the four passengers on the train were uninjured. The left front valance of 357043 was damaged. There are varying reports on the age of the driver and the number of passengers in the car.

Accidents as well as units 357028 and 357045 being out of service at the same time led to two spare Class 321/4 units, 321408 and 321428, being leased from sister National Express train operator Silverlink for three months for use on weekday peak time services between Fenchurch Street and Pitsea via Rainham, and Fenchurch Street and Laindon to cover for the unavailable Class 357 units. The Class 321 units were used with guards as they are incompatible with the positioning of c2c's face-on Driver Only Operation (D.O.O.) mirrors.

Units 357031 and 357320 were involved in a collision in East Ham depot in October 2017.

== Fleet details ==
| Class | Operator | Qty. | Year built | Cars per unit | Unit nos. | Notes |
|---|---|---|---|---|---|---|
| 357/0 | c2c | 46 | 1999–2001 | 4 | 357001–357046 | |
| 357/2 | c2c | 11 | 2001–2002 | 4 | 357201–357211 | Units 357212–357228 converted to 357/3 in 2015–2016 |
| 357/3 | c2c | 17 | 2001–2002 | 4 | 357312–357328 | Converted from 357/2 units 357212–357228 in 2015–2016 |

=== Illustrations ===
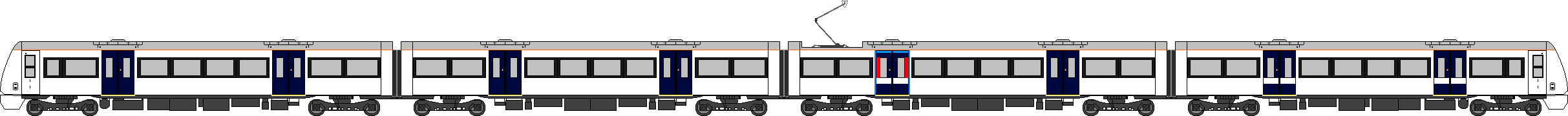

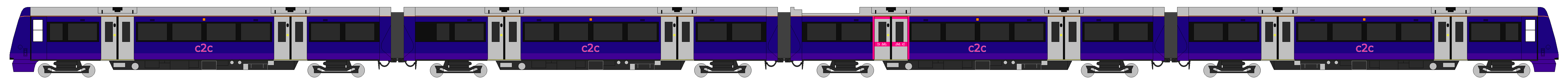

=== Named units ===
Several unit have been given names, many of them after longer-serving employees.

- 357001 – Barry Flaxman
- 357002 – Arthur Lewis Stride 1841-1922
- 357003 - Southend city on sea (formerly Jason Leonard)
- 357004 – Tony Amos
- 357005 – Southend 2017 Alternative City of Culture named at a ceremony at Leigh-on-Sea on 6 March 2015, in support of the town's naming as Alternative City of Culture 2017.
- 357011 – John Lowing
- 357018 – Remembering Our Fallen 88 1914-1918
- 357028 – London, Tilbury & Southend Railway 1854-2004
- 357029 – Thomas Whitelegg 1840-1922
- 357030 – Robert Harben Whitelegg 1871-1957
- 357201 - Ken Bird
- 357202 – Kenny Mitchell
- 357203 – Henry Pumfrett
- 357204 – Derek Fowers
- 357205 – John D‘Silva
- 357206 – Martin Aungier
- 357207 – John Page named in September 2008, after his 40 years' service as a driver and manager.
- 357208 – Dave Davis named in December 2007, after his 41 years' service as a driver.
- 357209 – James Snelling
- 357313 – Upminster IECC
- 357317 – Allan Burnell
- 357316 - Wilko Johnson 1947-2022 'He did it right'
- 357327 – Southend United

A nameplate is placed above the leading carriage's foremost passenger window between the cab door and the air intake on either side.
