= Secure Stations Scheme =

The Secure Stations Scheme is an accreditation scheme operated in the United Kingdom by the Department for Transport.

The scheme was started in 1998 and is open to the operators of any rail network policed by the British Transport Police. Each station is assessed separately; operators may choose to opt in or out of the scheme from time to time and accreditation for stations may lapse.

The criteria for accreditation cover four key areas:

- design of the station
- management of the station
- management of crime levels
- passenger perception of security

As of 24 April 2006, there were 252 accredited stations.

As of January 2019 more than 673 stations were accredited by the BTP. The Secure Stations Scheme was relaunched in 2017, with 172 stations being added or reinspected subsequently.
