= British Rail Class 307 =

Class of British electric multiple units

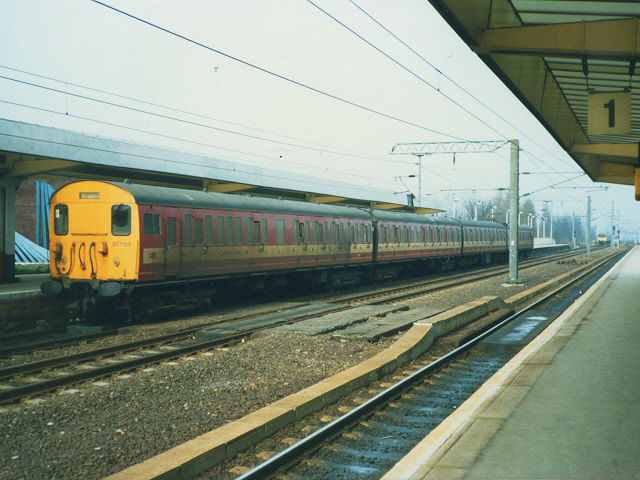
- Class 307 at Wakefield Westgate in 1991

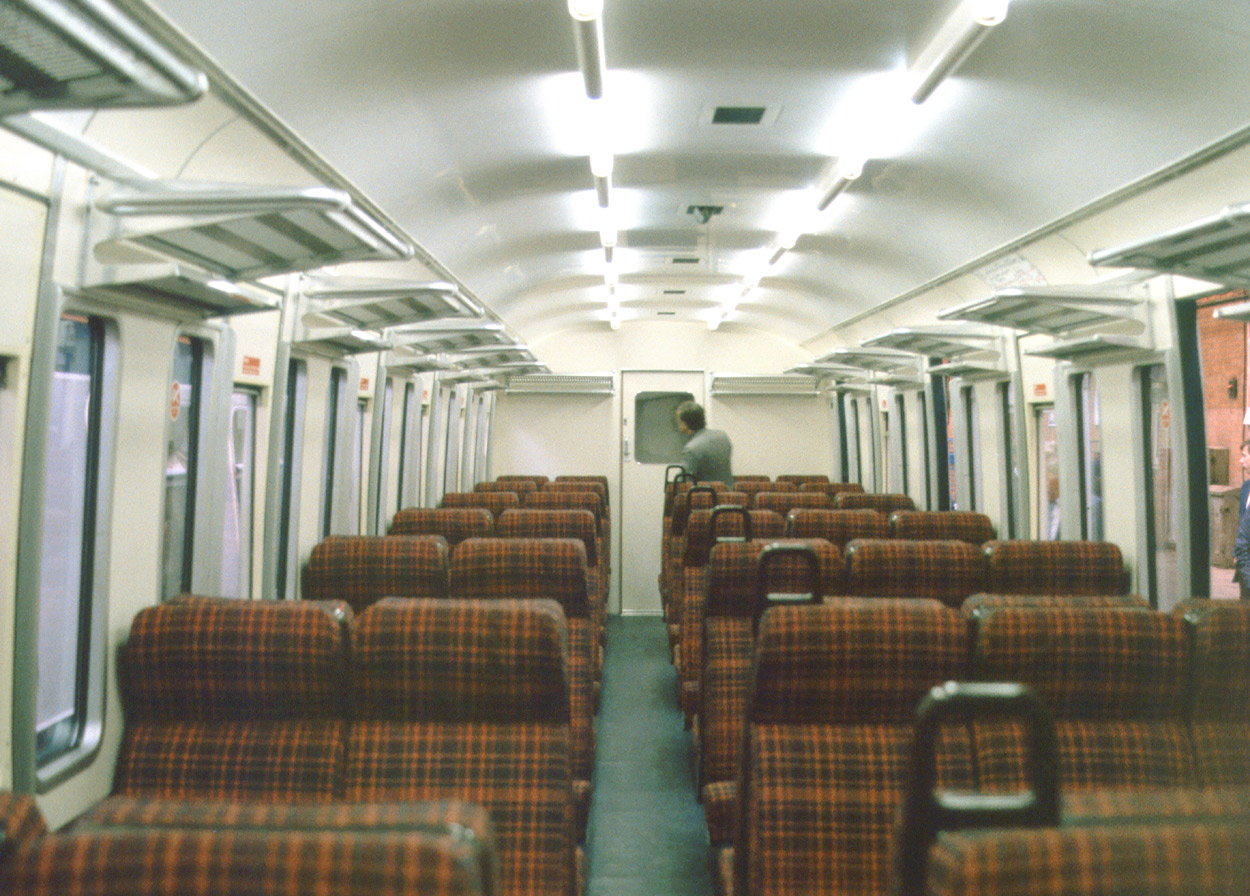
- Inside a refurbished unit
- In service: 1956–1993
- Manufacturer: British Rail
- Order nos.: 30203 (MBS); 30204 (TCsoL, later TSOL); 30205 (DTS, later DTBS then BDTBSO); 30206 (DTSOL, later DTCOL)
- Built at: Ashford Works; Eastleigh Works
- Constructed: 1954–1956
- Entered service: 1956
- Refurbished: 1960–1961 (AC conversion); 1983–1984
- Number built: 32
- Successor: Class 321
- Formation: 4 cars per unit: DTSO+MBS+TC+DTS (as built); DTBS+MS+TC+DTS (AC conversion); DTBS+MS+TS+DTC (refurbishment)
- Diagram: EC204 (MS); EE307 (DTC); EH222 (TS); EO202 (BDBS)
- Design code: AM7
- Fleet numbers: 307101-307132 (sets); 75001-75032 (DTSO); 61001-61032 (MBS); 70001-70032 (TC); 75101-75132 (DTS)
- Capacity: 19F/344S (as built); 80S (DTSO); 96S (MBS); 19F/60S (TC); 108S (DTS)
- Operator: British Rail
- Depots: Ilford; Neville Hill

Specifications
- Car body construction: Steel
- Train length: 265 ft 8 1/2 in (80.988 m)
- Car length: 63 ft 11 1/2 in (19.495 m) (Over body, DTSO, DTS); 63 ft 6 in (19.355 m) (Over body, MBS, TC)
- Width: 9 ft 3 in (2.824 m)
- Height: 13 ft 0 1/2 in (3.975 m)
- Doors: Slam
- Articulated sections: 4
- Wheelbase: 46 ft 6 in (14.173 m)
- Maximum speed: 75 mph (121 km/h)
- Weight: 154.5 t (152.1 long tons; 170.3 short tons) (total); 43 t (42 long tons; 47 short tons) (DTBS); 47.5 t (46.7 long tons; 52.4 short tons) (MS); 31 t (31 long tons; 34 short tons) (TS); 33 t (32 long tons; 36 short tons) (DTC)
- Traction motors: 4 × GEC WT344 of 170 hp (130 kW)
- Power output: 700 hp (520 kW)
- HVAC: Electric
- Electric systems: 25 kV AC OHLE; (Originally 1500 V DC OHLE then 6.25 kV AC OHLE and 25 kV AC OHLE)
- Current collection: Pantograph
- UIC classification: 2′2′+Bo′Bo′+2′2′+2′2′
- Bogies: Gresley ED7 (as built, MS); Gresley ET7 (as built, others); B4 (TSO, DTCO); B5 (BDTBSO)
- Braking system: Air (Auto/EP)
- Safety system: AWS
- Coupling system: Buckeye
- Multiple working: Within ER fleet
- Track gauge: 1,435 mm (4 ft 8 1/2 in) Standard gauge

Notes/references
- 42 × DTs converted 1994–96 to PCV for RES

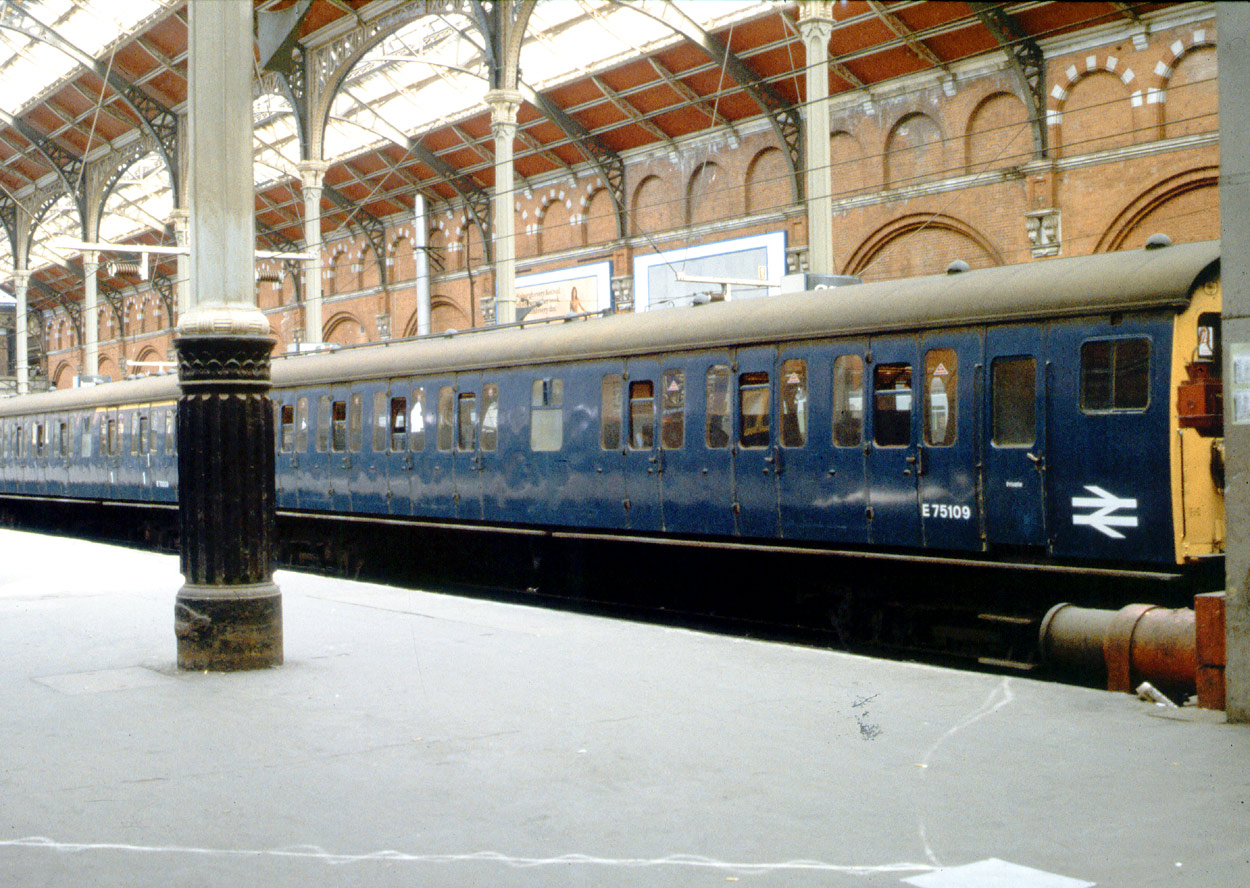
British Rail Class 307 train at London Liverpool Street station. The frosted windows show the location of the toilets. The second carriage includes some first-class seating.

The British Rail Class 307 electric multiple units were built by BR at Eastleigh Works from 1954 to 1956. They were initially classified as AM7 before the introduction of TOPS.

== Description ==
Thirty-two of these 4-car units were built for services on the Great Eastern Main Line.

All units were formed of four cars. When originally built, units were numbered in the range 01s-32s and were composed of two outer driving trailers, an intermediate trailer composite (i.e. with some first-class seating) and an intermediate motor brake. The units were constructed to operate off the 1,500 V direct current (DC) overhead power system used on Eastern Region suburban lines from Liverpool Street to Shenfield and Southend Victoria. However, in the late 1950s / early 1960s, these lines were converted to the 6.25 kV/25 kV alternating current (AC) overhead system, which was adopted as standard and coincided with the introduction of new Class 302 (AM2) units. Therefore, from 1960 to 1962, the entire AM7 fleet was extensively rebuilt at Eastleigh Works to allow units to operate from the new voltage system. The work including moving the guard's compartment from the motor coach to one of the driving trailers. At the same time, units were renumbered into the range 101–132.

From 1983 to 1984, the fleet was refurbished. Work involved replacing all compartments with open saloons and the fitting of gangways between vehicles within a unit. The first-class seating was also moved from the trailer to the non-brake driving trailer. During this period, units were renumbered under the TOPS system to 307101–307132.

Details of the vehicle designations are shown below.

Vehicle Numbers	As-built (1954)	Rebuilt (1960)	Refurbished (1983)
75001-75032	DTSO	DTBS	DTBSO
70001-70032	TCOL	TCOL	TSOL
61001-61032	MBS	MS	MSO
75101-75132	DTSsoL	DTSsoL	DTCOL

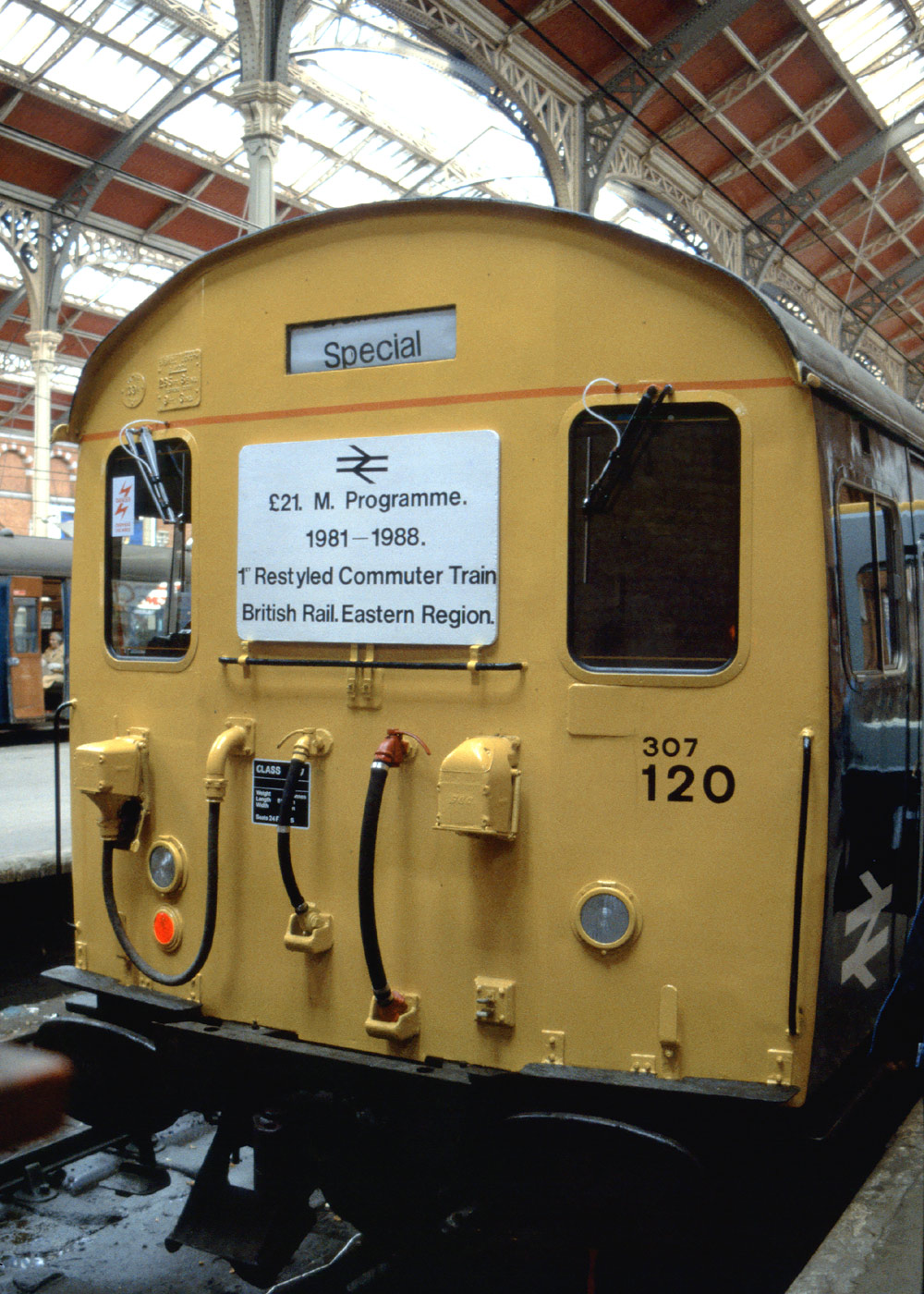
Refurbished British Railways Class 307 train showing the special headboard carried at the launch of the first refurbished train.

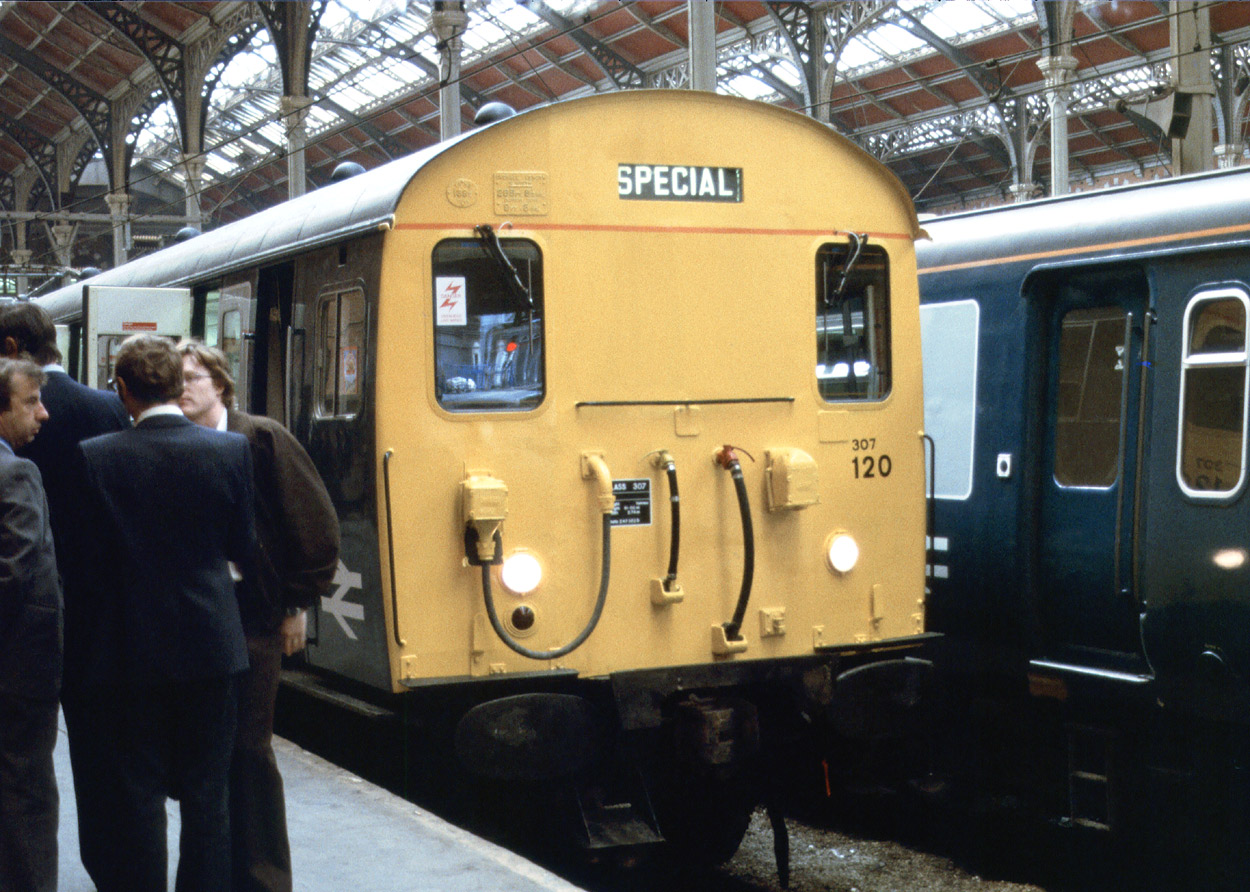
The front of a refurbished British Railways Class 307 train without the headboard. Part of a Class 315 train can be seen behind.

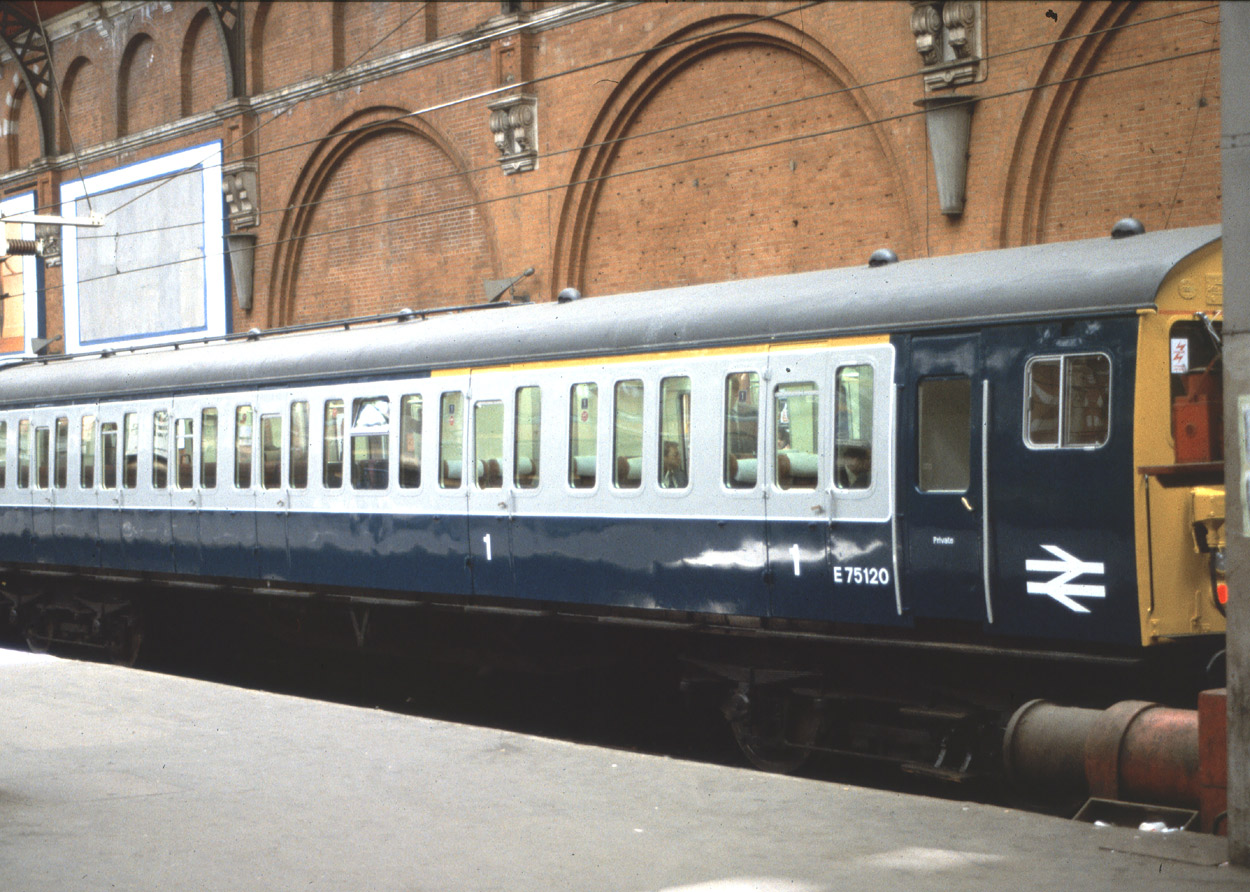
Side view of a refurbished British Railways Class 307 train, showing that it has also been repainted in blue/grey livery and that the first-class seating has been relocated and converted from compartment with side corridor to 'open' format

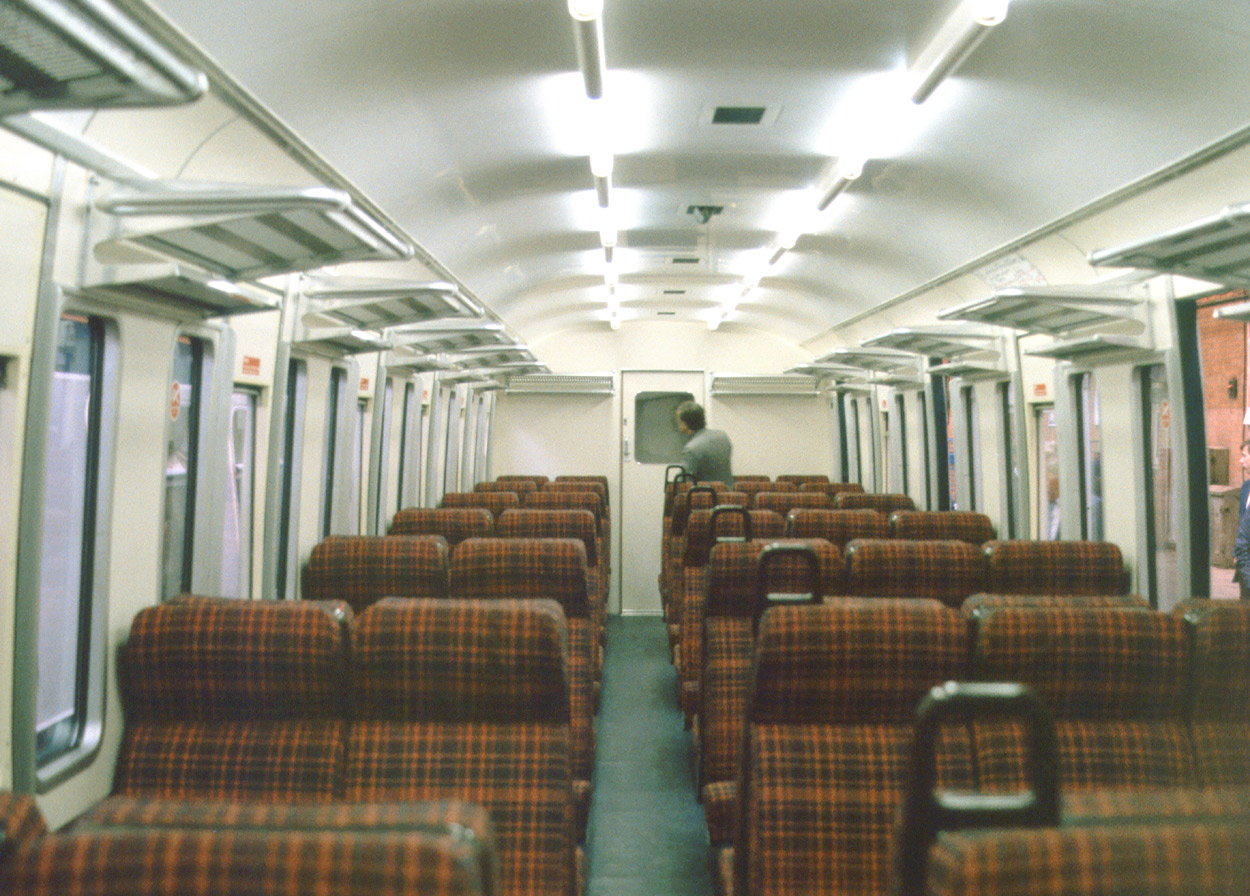
Interior of a refurbished British Railways Class 307 train showing the high capacity 2+3 standard/second class seating

== Operations ==
When new, these trains were used on the newly electrified Great Eastern Main Line, running between Liverpool Street and Southend Victoria on semi-fast services. In 1960 the electrification system on this route was converted from 1,500 V DC to 25 kV AC overhead, necessitating the rebuild of the fleet.

Following refurbishment in 1983, the fleet saw continued use; primarily on the Liverpool Street to Southend Victoria line, but also on the London, Tilbury and Southend line. From 1986, a few trains were repainted in Network SouthEast livery. By 1990, however, the class had been displaced from the LTS route by Class 310 trains, themselves cascaded from the West Coast Main Line following introduction of new Class 321/4 trains, supplemented temporarily by Class 317 trains. The Class 307 trains did not last much longer on the Great Eastern route, following the introduction of the new Class 321/3s.

By 1991, all Class 307 trains had been withdrawn from Network SouthEast services. However, five trains (307105/111/120/122/130) were overhauled at Doncaster Works for use on the newly electrified Wakefield Line service between Leeds and Doncaster. They received the West Yorkshire Metro maroon livery. The use of these units was intended as a stop-gap until three new Class 321/9 trains entered service. The final Class 307 trains were withdrawn in early 1993.

Following withdrawal, large-scale scrapping of the class was delayed as it was intended to rebuild the units as Class 300 parcels units. This plan was dropped in favour of building new Class 325 units. However, many of the driving trailer vehicles were eventually rebuilt as Propelling Control Vehicles (see below). The redundant intermediate trailers and motor vehicles were eventually scrapped.

== Further use ==
=== Departmental use ===
Following withdrawal from service, several units were converted for further use as departmental vehicles. These are listed below.

==== Crash tests ====
Units 307101, 307106 and 307121 were used a crash-test units at Old Dalby, for use in simulated crashes for safety purposes.

==== Class 316 testbed unit ====
Unit 307118 was converted into a test unit for the 'Holec' three-phase AC traction motors and associated electrical gear used in the Class 323 EMUs. As 316998, the BDTBSO coach had its seating removed and the electrical equipment mounted in the passenger cabin and cooling provided via a large grill fitted in place of the guard's doors on the left hand side. The pantograph well was also revised, bringing it closer towards the cab.

Later, the unit was altered for 750 V DC third rail operation, the pickup shoes being mounted on the former MSO and renumbered 316997. After testing, the unit was stored at the back of Eastleigh T&RSMD. Scrapping took place at Caerwent in July 2006.

=== Postal conversions ===
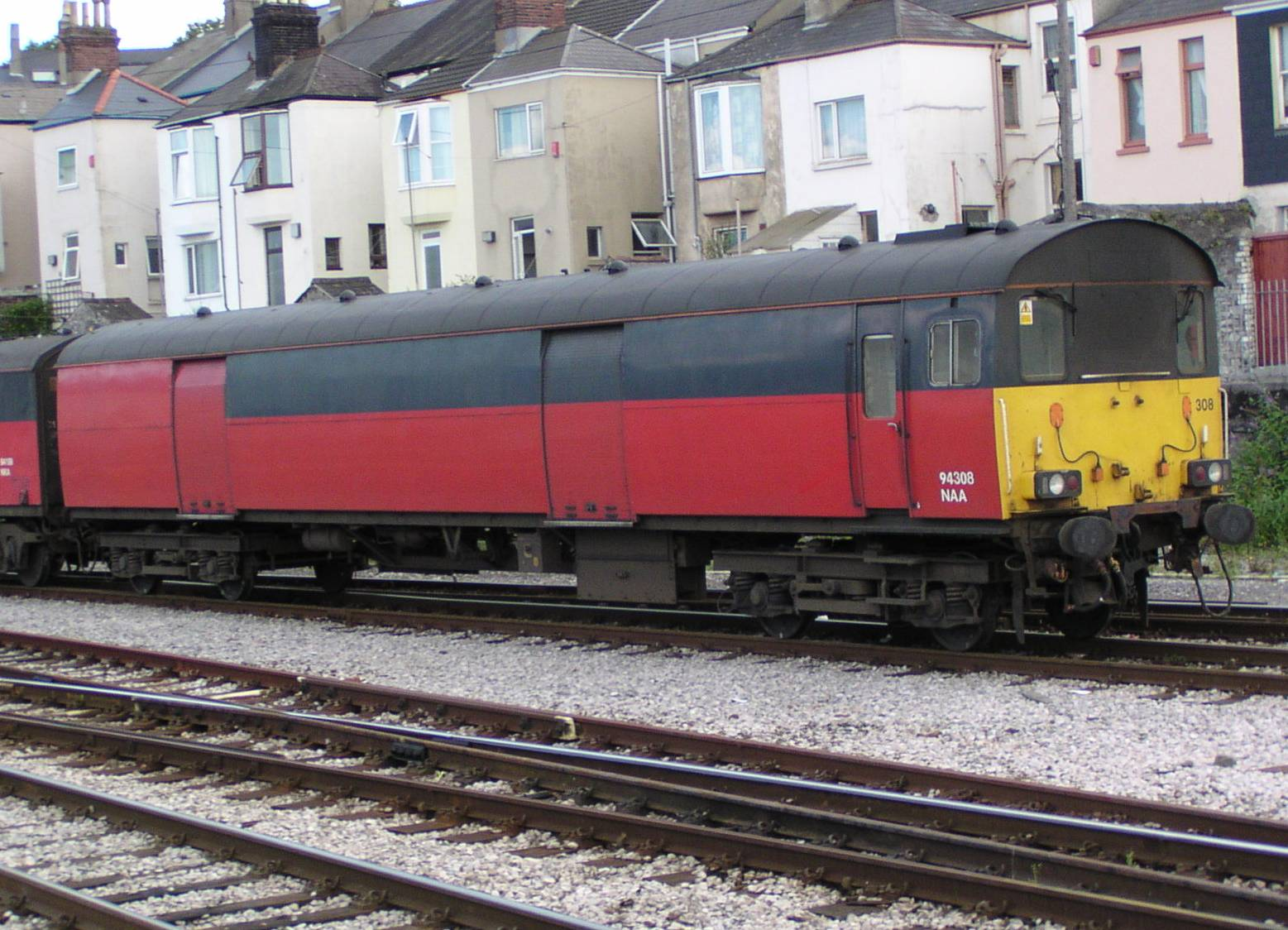
Propelling Control Vehicle, NAA 94308 propelling a train into Plymouth station in 2003. This vehicle is painted in unbranded Rail Express Systems livery.

==== Proposed Class 300 ====
Class 300 was allocated to a proposed fleet of parcels-carrying electric multiple units, which were to be converted from former Class 307 units.

In the early 1990s, the Class 307 passenger units were being withdrawn from service. At the same time, the Parcels sector of British Rail, later known as Rail Express Systems, were looking for a fleet of parcels multiple units, which would be more cost effective to run than locomotive-hauled stock used at the time. One suggestion was to convert a number of Class 307 units to meet the need, as had been done with four of the similar Class 302 units, and several Class 307 units were set aside and stored with this possibility in mind.

However, the age and design of the units counted against them, and the decision was taken instead to build new units, which became the Class 325.

==== Propelling Control Vehicles ====
After the decision not to proceed with the Class 300, Rail Express Systems instead sought driving trailers to operate in push-pull mode with a locomotive. This would remove the time-consuming process of changing the locomotive to other end of the train to allow it to leave a terminus. These newly refurbished vehicles were called Propelling Control Vehicles (PCVs), since it was envisaged that they would only be used to propel a train into or out of a terminus, and not used at high speed or over long distances.

It was decided to convert the vehicles from the many redundant Class 307 vehicles that were stored at various locations around the country. In 1994, two vehicles were rebuilt as prototype PCV vehicles, and underwent an extensive testing procedure. In the period 1994–1996, a further 40 redundant driving trailer vehicles were rebuilt by Hunslet-Barclay in Kilmarnock.

The rebuilding work included removal of the windows and slam-doors, the fitting of roller-shutter doors, and modernisation of the cab. The vehicles were given the TOPS code NAA and were numbered in the range 94300-327 (for former DTCOL vehicles) and 94331-345 (for former DTBSO vehicles).

Vehicle nos. 94300/301 were the prototype Propelling Control Vehicles. Due to their non-standard nature, they have since had their push-pull equipment isolated and are used as standard parcels vans. To reflect this change, the two vehicles have been renumbered to 95300/301.

Details of the vehicles converted to PCVs are shown below.

Original no.	Former vehicle type	New PCV no.	Comments
75004	DTBSO	94345	-
75005	DTBSO	94342	-
75007	DTBSO	94341	-
75008	DTBSO	94338	-
75011	DTBSO	94332	-
75012	DTBSO	94340	-
75014	DTBSO	94344	-
75016	DTBSO	94333	-
75017	DTBSO	94334	-
75022	DTBSO	94331	-
75024	DTBSO	94339	-
75027	DTBSO	94343	-
75029	DTBSO	94337	-
75031	DTBSO	94336	-
75032	DTBSO	94335	-
75102	DTCOL	94301	Since renumbered to 95301
75103	DTCOL	94324	-
75104	DTCOL	94305	-
75105	DTCOL	94311	-
75107	DTCOL	94304	-
75108	DTCOL	94316	-
75109	DTCOL	94314	-
75110	DTCOL	94323	-
75111	DTCOL	94322	-
75112	DTCOL	94306	-
75113	DTCOL	94325	-
75114	DTCOL	94300	Since renumbered to 95300
75115	DTCOL	94318	-
75116	DTCOL	94327	-
75117	DTCOL	94317	-
75119	DTCOL	94310	-
75120	DTCOL	94320	Preserved, Mid-Norfolk Railway
75122	DTCOL	94321	-
75123	DTCOL	94326	-
75124	DTCOL	94302	-
75125	DTCOL	94308	-
75126	DTCOL	94312	-
75127	DTCOL	94307	-
75128	DTCOL	94319	-
75129	DTCOL	94313	-
75130	DTCOL	94309	-
75131	DTCOL	94303	-
75132	DTCOL	94315	-

Carriage nos. 94303/07/10/11/15/16/17/20/22/31/34/36/37/38/39/40/ have been sold for scrap to CF Booths, and carriage nos. 94305/09/19/21/25/41/42/45 to TJ Thompson.

A rake of derelict PCV's are at Hellifield (N Yorks) (in Feb 2019) owned by West Coast Railways. The following units are stored at Hellifield 94303 94333 94326 94323 94504 94302 94527 94306 94546 94495 17/04/19

== Preservation ==
One driving Brake trailer from unit 307123 has been saved for preservation.

- 75023 – Colne Valley Railway. Restoration ongoing.

Two PCV conversion has also been saved for preservation.

- 94320 – Mid-Norfolk Railway. Under restoration as stores vehicle.
- 95301 - Prototype PCV, preserved, Andrew Briddon Locomotives, Darley Dale.

One vehicle, DTBSO no. 75018 (ex-977708) was bought by the AC Loco Group at Barrow Hill Engine Shed for spares recovery. It was scrapped at Caerwent MOD in 2006.
