= Propelling control vehicle =

British mail-carrying control cars

British Rail propelling control vehicle
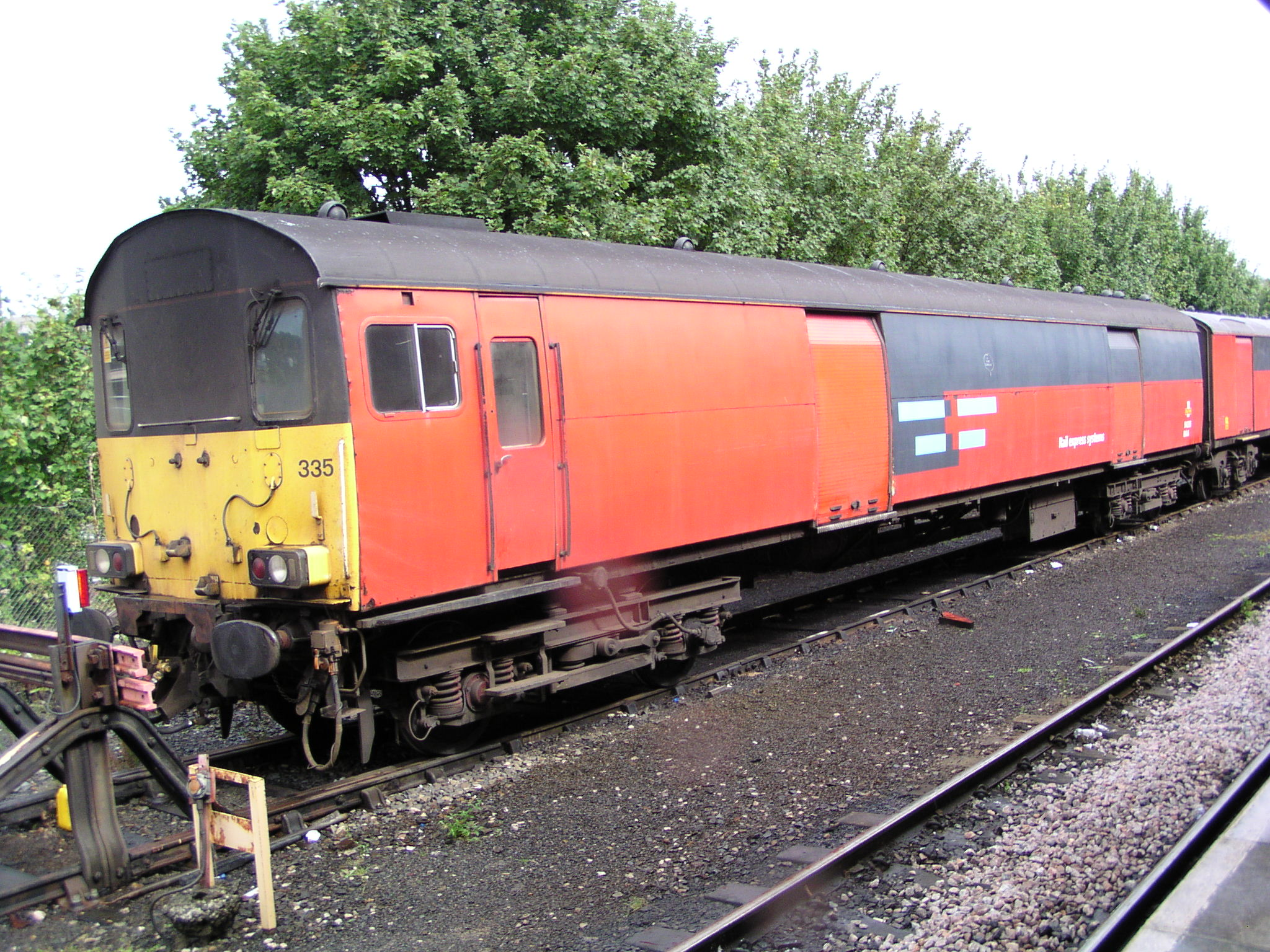
- NAA 94335 at Plymouth on 29 August 2003. This vehicle is in Rail Express Systems red/grey livery with light blue flashes.
- In service: 1994–2004
- Manufacturer: Hunslet-Barclay (conversion)
- Constructed: 1994–1996 (conversion from class 307)
- Number built: 42
- Number in service: None
- Number preserved: 2
- Number scrapped: 24
- Fleet numbers: 94302–94327, 94331–94345, 95300–95301
- Operators: Rail Express Systems, EWS

Specifications
- Car body construction: Steel
- Car length: 63 ft 11 1/2 in (19.495 m)
- Width: 9 ft 3 in (2.824 m)
- Height: 13 ft 0 1/2 in (3.975 m)
- Braking system(s): Air brake
- Safety system(s): AWS
- Track gauge: 4 ft 8 1/2 in (1,435 mm)

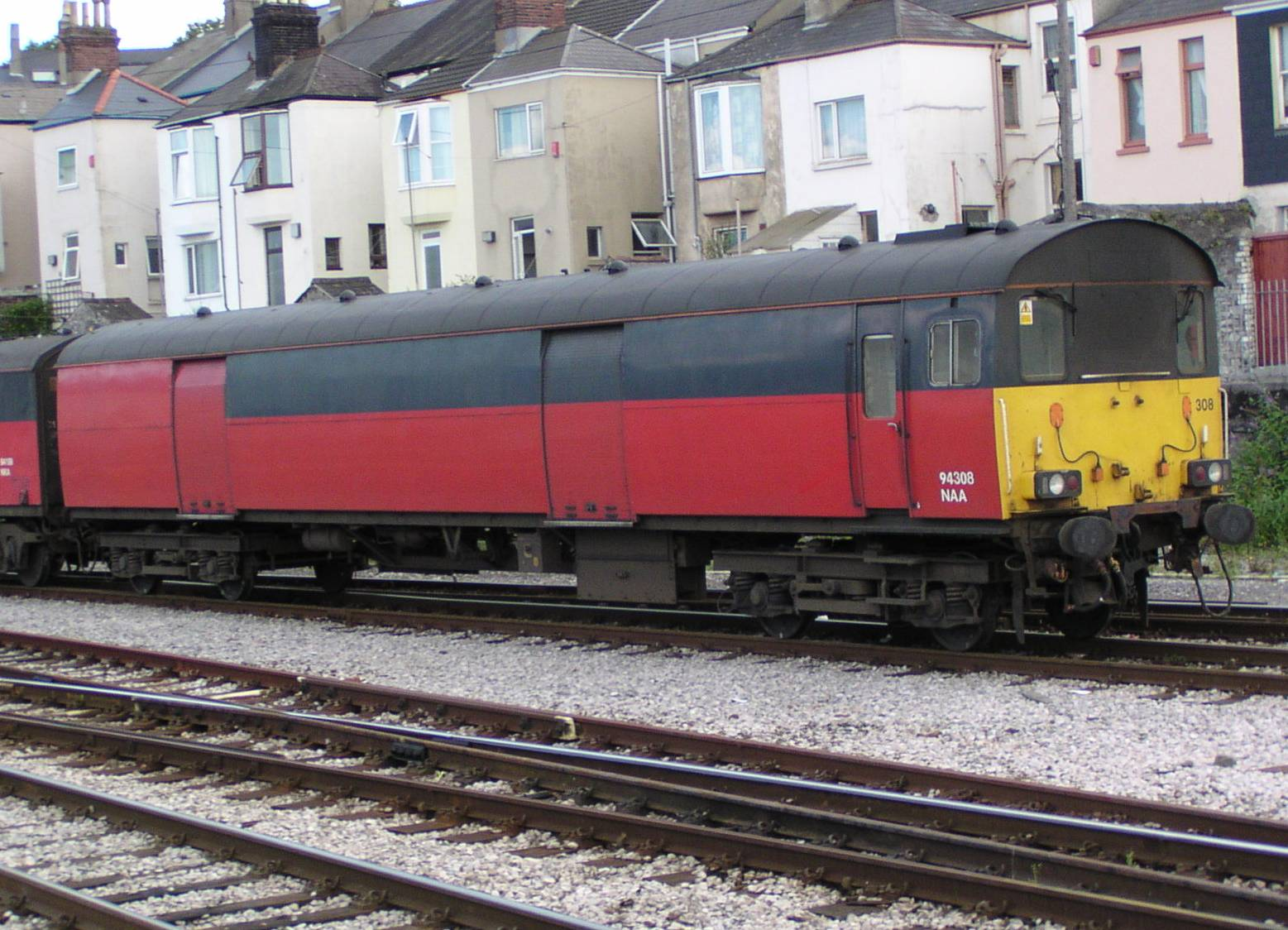
NAA 94308 on a train being propelled into Plymouth station on 29 August 2003. This vehicle is in unbranded Rail Express Systems livery.

A propelling control vehicle (PCV) is a type of British railway carriage for carrying mail. They were converted from Class 307 driving trailers and have a cab at one end which allows slow-speed movement control. PCVs are unpowered but the controls allow mail trains to be reversed at low speed, using the power of the locomotive at the other end of the train. Similar BR Class 91 driving van trailer (DVT) used on the ECML differ by being fully equipped for high-speed train control.

Forty-two PCVs were converted by Hunslet-Barclay in Kilmarnock from 1994 to 1996. The rebuilding work including removal of the windows and slam-doors, the fitting of roller shutter doors, and modernisation of the cab. The vehicles were given the TOPS code NAA and numbered 94300–94327 and 94331–94345. The first two vehicles converted were prototypes, and were extensively tested to iron out any problems. The subsequent 40 vehicles incorporated modifications as a result of this testing. At the same time these vehicles were converted, the Class 47/7 locomotives that hauled mail trains were modified to be able to work in push-pull mode with the PCVs.

When first converted the vehicles were used by the Rail Express Systems parcels sector of British Rail. They were painted in Rail Express Systems red/grey livery with light blue flashes. PCVs were marshalled at either end of mail trains that worked into London termini, which removed the need for the locomotive to run round the train at its destination. Trains were propelled only at low speed, not for long distances.

In 1996 Rail Express Systems was sold to EWS, who continued to operate mail trains on behalf of Royal Mail. PCVs were used on trains between London and Norwich, Plymouth, Bristol, Swansea, Newcastle and Glasgow. PCVs were also used on travelling post office trains from London to Plymouth, Newcastle, Norwich, Carlisle and Glasgow.

The two prototype PCVs, nos. 94300/1, were non-standard. Consequently, they were used as standard mail coaches on a new high-speed mail train from Walsall to Inverness, painted in EWS maroon/gold livery and renumbered 95300/1.

In early 2004, EWS lost the contract to transport mail. As a result, all PCVs except initially 95300/1 were withdrawn from service, pending new traffic, sale or scrapping. After a limited amount of residual traffic, and trials for possible use for the movement of secure goods, 95300 and 95301 were also withdrawn. 94320 was preserved by the Mid-Norfolk Railway in April 2009, with 95301 being preserved at the Andrew Briddon Locomotives site at Darley Dale in September 2016.

== Fleet details ==
The table below shows details of the fleet, including numbering and disposition.

Key:	Stored	Preserved	Renumbered	Scrapped

PCV no.	Former no.	Former vehicle type	Status
94300	75114	DTCOL	Push-pull equipment removed. Renumbered to 95300
94301	75102	DTCOL	Push-pull equipment removed. Renumbered to 95301
94302	75124	DTCOL	Withdrawn, Stored near Hellifield station (seen May 2015)
94303	75131	DTCOL	Withdrawn, Stored near Hellifield station (seen May 2015)
94304	75107	DTCOL	Withdrawn, Stored at Millerhill
94305	75104	DTCOL	Scrapped by TJ Thompson, Stockton
94306	75112	DTCOL	Withdrawn, Stored near Hellifield station (seen May 2015)
94307	75127	DTCOL	Scrapped by C F Booth, Rotherham
94308	75125	DTCOL	Withdrawn, Stored at Carnforth (Seen February 2016)
94309	75130	DTCOL	Scrapped by TJ Thompson, Stockton
94310	75119	DTCOL	Withdrawn, Stored at Willesden (Seen August 2016)
94311	75105	DTCOL	Withdrawn, Stored at Willesden (Seen August 2016)
94312	75126	DTCOL	Scrapped
94313	75129	DTCOL	Withdrawn, Stored at Willesden (Seen August 2016)
94314	75109	DTCOL	Scrapped
94315	75132	DTCOL	Scrapped by C F Booth, Rotherham (08/2006)
94316	75108	DTCOL	Withdrawn, Stored at Toton (Seen April 2021)
94317	75117	DTCOL	Withdrawn, Stored at Toton (Seen April 2021)
94318	75115	DTCOL	Withdrawn, Location Unknown
94319	75128	DTCOL	Scrapped by TJ Thompson, Stockton
94320	75120	DTCOL	Preserved on Mid-Norfolk Railway
94321	75122	DTCOL	Scrapped by TJ Thompson, Stockton
94322	75111	DTCOL	Withdrawn, Stored at Carnforth (Seen February 2016)
94323	75110	DTCOL	Withdrawn, Stored near Hellifield station (Seen May 2015)
94324	75103	DTCOL	Scrapped
94325	75113	DTCOL	Scrapped by TJ Thompson, Stockton
94326	75123	DTCOL	Withdrawn, Stored near Hellifield station (Seen May 2015)
94327	75116	DTCOL	Scrapped by TJ Thompson, Stockton
94331	75022	DTBSO	Scrapped by C F Booth, Rotherham
94332	75011	DTBSO	Withdrawn, Stored at Carnforth (Seen February 2016)
94333	75016	DTBSO	Withdrawn, Stored near Hellifield station (Seen May 2015)
94334	75017	DTBSO	Scrapped by C F Booth, Rotherham
94335	75032	DTBSO	Withdrawn, Stored Burton-on-Trent (Seen April 2015)
94336	75031	DTBSO	Withdrawn, Stored Crewe (Seen September 2024)
94337	75029	DTBSO	Withdrawn, Stored at Willesden (Seen August 2016)
94338	75008	DTBSO	Withdrawn, Stored at Willesden (Seen August 2016)
94339	75024	DTBSO	Scrapped by C F Booth, Rotherham
94340	75012	DTBSO	Scrapped by C F Booth, Rotherham
94341	75007	DTBSO	Scrapped by TJ Thompson, Stockton
94342	75005	DTBSO	Scrapped by TJ Thompson, Stockton
94343	75027	DTBSO	Withdrawn, Stored at Mossend
94344	75014	DTBSO	Withdrawn, Stored at Toton (Seen April 2021)
94345	75004	DTBSO	Scrapped by TJ Thompson, Stockton
95300	94300	Prototype PCV	Withdrawn, Stored at Mossend
95301	94301	Prototype PCV	Preserved, Andrew Briddon Locomotives, Darley Dale

== See also ==
- Control car - a passenger car with a train control cab used in push-pull service.
