= Rail Express Systems =

Sector of British Rail

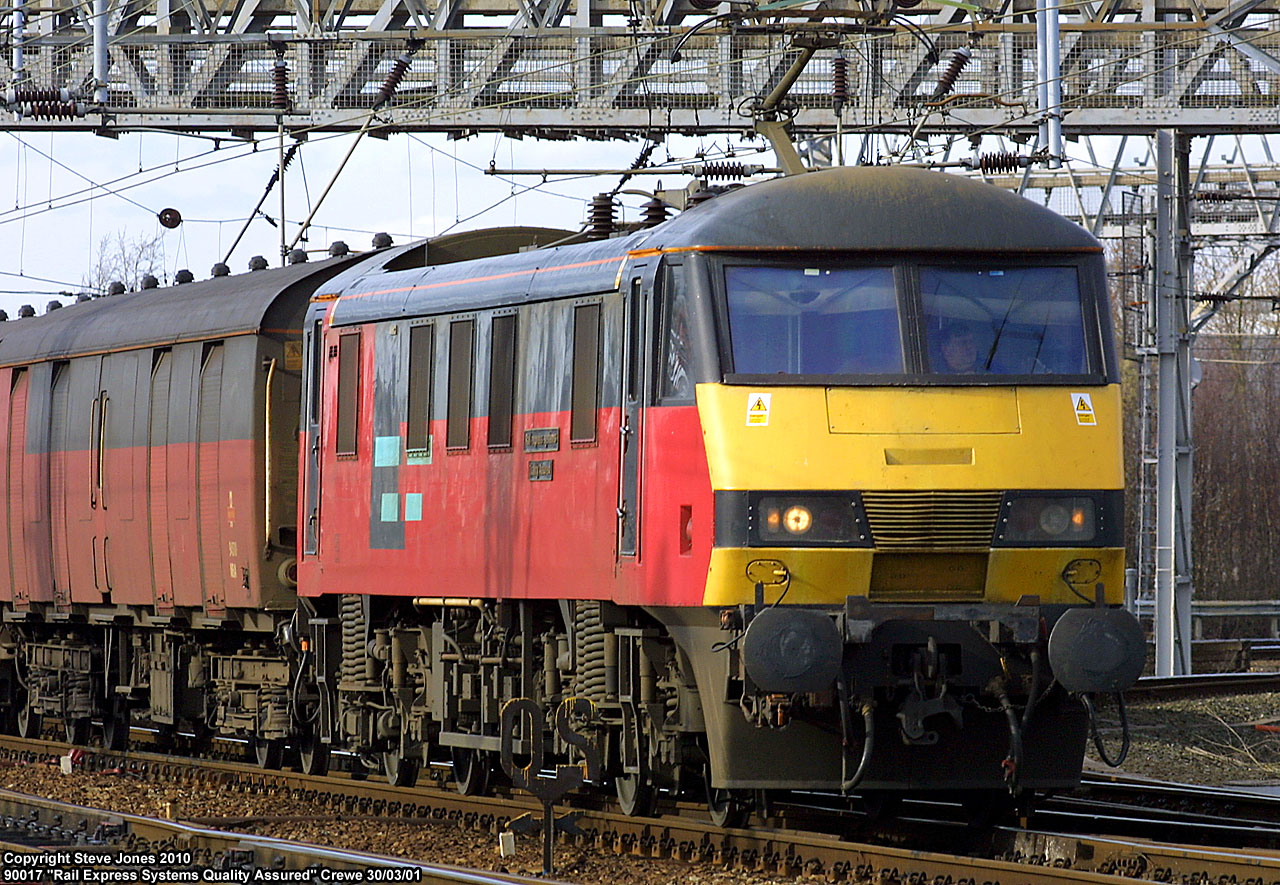
- 90017 at Crewe in 2001
- Type: State owned
- Industry: Package & mail transport
- Predecessor: Parcels sector
- Founded: 1982
- Defunct: 1996
- Fate: Integrated into English Welsh & Scottish (EWS)
- Successor: English, Welsh & Scottish
- Area served: United Kingdom
- Services: Mail & package delivery, charter trains
- Parent: British Rail

Rail Express Systems (RES) was a sector of British Rail. This sector was responsible for transport of mail and parcels, including the travelling post office trains, as well as taking over charter operations from InterCity and haulage of the Royal Train.

RES had been created out of a policy of Sectorisation, its functions previously being undertaken as an integral element of British Rail in the 1980s. Initially known simply as the Parcels Sector, it was decided to re-brand it as Rail Express Systems during late 1991. The entity's management team sought to improve the economics of its operations and to better satisfy its customer's needs, the principal one being the Royal Mail. Thus, various initiatives were undertaken, including the procurement of new rolling stock in the form of 16 four-car British Rail Class 325, a series of electric multiple units built exclusively for moving mail.

During the mid-1990s, RES implemented a £150 million strategy that focused on long-distance services that worked in conjunction with a central hub based in London at its heart, known as Railnet. As a consequence, many stations had their mail services permanently withdrawn as they were redirected to a series of hubs across the country; the final mail train services departed King's Cross, Euston, Liverpool Street and Paddington stations on 27 September 1996. As a result of the privatisation of British Rail during the mid-1990s, RES was put up for sale to the private sector. Following a competitive bidding process, the entity was purchased entirely by the recently created railway freight operator English Welsh & Scottish (EWS); shortly thereafter, RES was integrated into the firm and ceased to exist as an independent operation. A few years later, railway-based mail operations ended entirely in Britain due to the increasingly poor economics involved.

== History ==
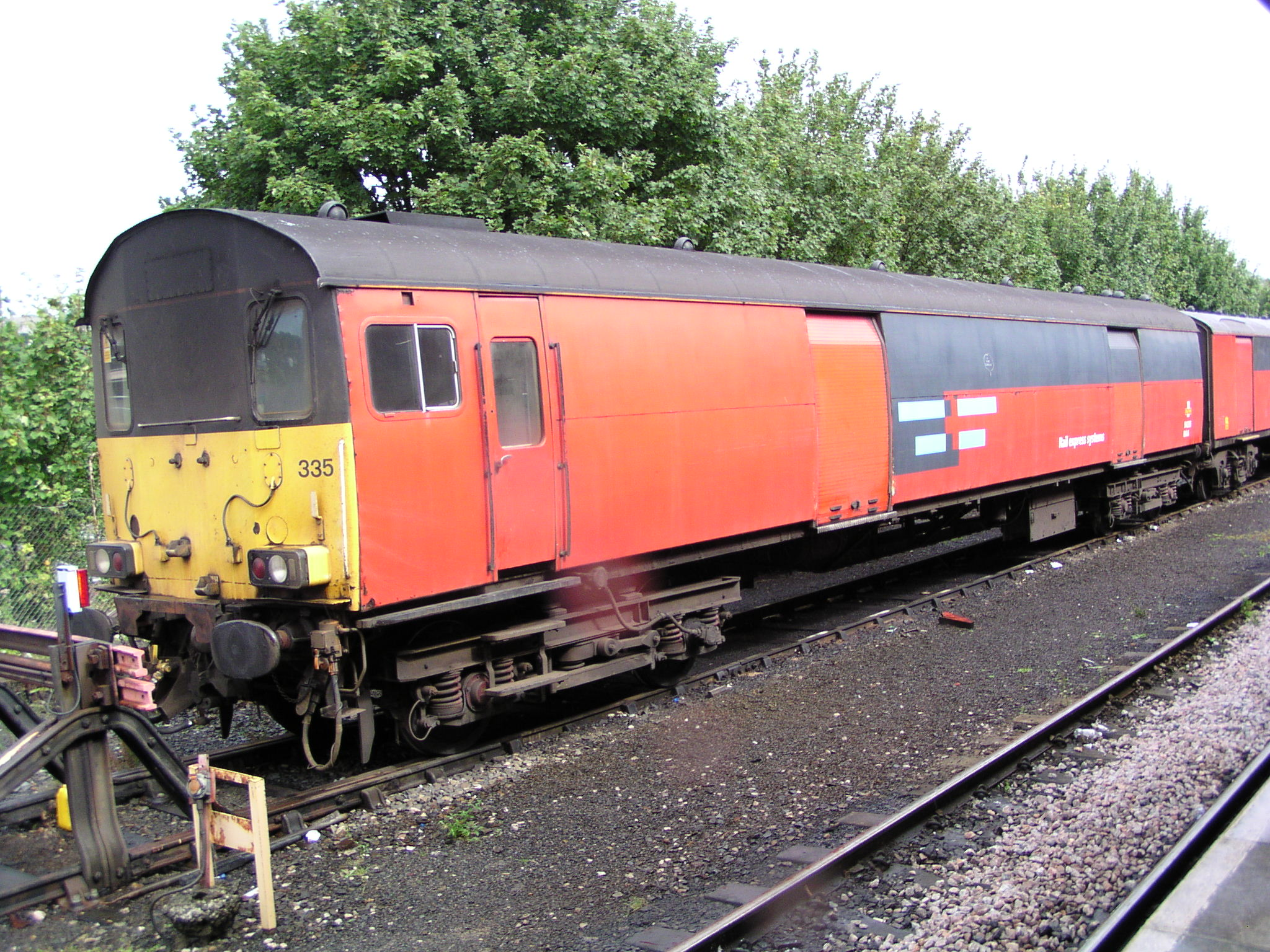
Rail Express Systems livery as carried by Propelling Control Vehicle no. 94335 stabled at Plymouth on 29 August 2003

During the 1980s, British Rail's senior management endeavoured to rejuvenate numerous aspects of its operations and to better fulfil customer demands. Under the policy of Sectorisation, BR's entire rail-based mail operations were consolidated into their own business unit, Rail Express Systems (RES). This reorganisation under its own management team led to a new focus of its operations on the specific needs of its primary customer, the Royal Mail (RM).

During October 1991, RES was officially launched at Crewe Diesel TMD. For this event, examples of Class 08, 47, 86 and 90 locomotives were painted into a new livery of red, with a grey upper band, and light blue and grey flashes. The light blue and grey flashes represent a set of stylised eagle's wings.

The sector had maintenance depots at Crewe, Bristol Barton Hill, Cambridge and Euston Downside. Rolling stock was also maintained by other sectors at Heaton and Liverpool Edge Hill. Amongst the more unusual duties that fell under RES' umbrella, was its responsibility for the haulage of the Royal Train whenever required.

Seeking to rejuvenate rail mail, RES devised a £150 million strategy that focused on long-distance services that worked in conjunction with a central hub based in London at its heart, known as Railnet. During late 1993, RES and RM had signed a 13-year deal with RES to operate the trains from this new hub, also referred to as the London Distribution Centre or the Princess Royal Distribution Centre, at Stonebridge Park, near Wembley. Furthermore, RM commissioned ABB to manufacture 16 four-car British Rail Class 325 electric multiple units, which were designed exclusively for the transport of mail.

During RES's existence, there were numerous operational changes made in the use of Britain's railways in regards to the delivery of both mail and parcels. Throughout the 1990s, many smaller services were cut back, and mail services were removed from most passenger stations. Following the opening of the new London hub on 30 September 1996, British rail mail operations were drastically restructured, only dedicated mail trains were operated after this date and thus were no longer based at any main line stations, as it had been decided to centrally base all London mail trains at the hub instead. Accordingly, the final mail train services departed King's Cross, Euston, Liverpool Street and Paddington stations on 27 September 1996. In place of passenger stations, these services were directly to a number of mail hubs at strategic locations; these were: Shieldmuir (Motherwell), Low Fell (Gateshead), Warrington, Doncaster, Bristol Parkway, Tonbridge and Wembley PRDC (London) as well as dedicated platforms at Stafford.

The restructuring of services, intended to enable the faster delivery of mail to distant destinations, necessitated the streamlining of both mail pick-ups and drop-offs, a policy which resulted in many intermediate locations seeing the permanently withdrawn of coverage by RES services. Instead, mail was to be transported by road to the 45 stations that would be served by the remaining mail trains. Despite this, the increasing efficiency of mechanical sorting in comparison to the hand sorting methods used onboard RES' fleet of travelling post offices (TPOs) meant that the latter was becoming increasingly uneconomic regardless of the structural changes being made.

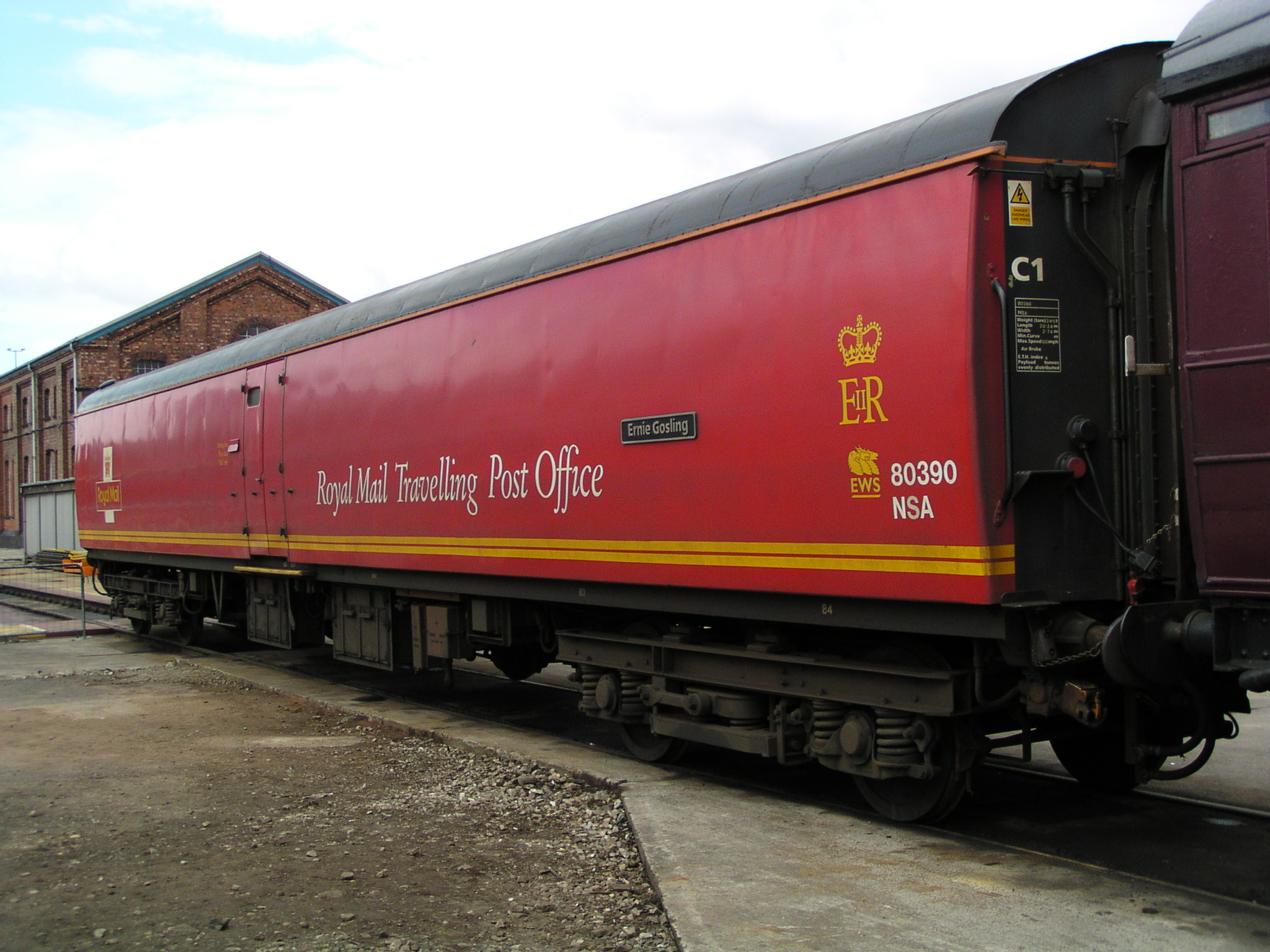
British Rail TPO vehicle NSA 80390 on display at Doncaster Works open day on 27 July 2003. This type of vehicle, based on the British Rail Mark 1 coach, was the final design of TPO vehicle used in the United Kingdom.

As part of the privatisation of British Rail, RES was the first freight company put up for sale, with bids lodged by Freightliner, a management buyout, Serco and a Wisconsin Central led a consortium known as North and South railways. The latter's bid was successful, the sale taking effect on 9 December 1995 with 164 locomotives and 677 wagons included. In 1996, the business was integrated into English Welsh & Scottish (EWS), ceasing to exist as a separate entity.

Rail-based mail traffic continued to decline following the integration. A further factor that negatively impacted such operations was the Hatfield rail crash during October 2000, which led to numerous restrictions being imposed upon TPOs, including new speed limitations and numerous cancellations across many routes. There were also rising concerns over the safety of staff, as there was little consideration towards the crashworthiness or the wellbeing of the TPO's occupants in the event of a major accident. Furthermore, the Royal Mail had increasingly decided to make use of other means of transporting mail, including aircraft and road vehicles. Amid these various factors, during 2003, it was announced that Royal Mail had decided to suspend all transportation of mail by rail.

== Mid 1990s routes ==
Travelling post office routes

- London-Glasgow
- London-Carlisle
- London-Newcastle
- London-Dover
- London-Norwich
- Penzance-Bristol
- Plymouth-Newcastle
- Cardiff-Glasgow

Other mail trains

- London-Bristol
- London-Glasgow
- London-Newcastle
- London-Norwich
- London-Plymouth
- London-Swansea
- Plymouth-Glasgow
- Plymouth-Newcastle
- York-Shrewsbury (ECS worked from Newcastle and reversed into p1 at York)

== Parcels Sector rolling stock ==
The late 1980s and early 1990s saw many changes to the Rail Express Systems fleet, with the cessation of the usage of Class 105s by 1987, Class 114s by 1990, Class 120s by 1987, Class 127s by 1989, Class 128s by 1990, Class 302s by 1996 and Class 308s by 1989.

In the same period, Class 325 EMUs were introduced and the entire parcels and mails fleet (except the travelling post office stock) was refurbished or withdrawn.

Class	Image	Number	Power
Class 08			Diesel Shunter
Class 31			Diesel Locomotive
Class 47			Diesel Locomotive
Class 86			AC Electric Locomotive
Class 90		5	AC Electric Locomotive
Class 105		9	DMU
Class 114		10	DMU
Class 120		10	DMU
Class 127		23	DMU
Class 128		5	DMU
Class 302		6	EMU
Class 308		3	EMU
Class 325		16	EMU

Coach Type	Image	Number	Notes
NAA - Propelling control vehicle		24	
NBA - Brake Gangwayed (High-security)			
NDX - Brake Gangwayed (90 mph)			
NEX - Brake Gangwayed (100 mph)			
NHA - Brake Gangwayed (110 mph)			
NIA - Brake Gangwayed (high-security) (110 mph)			
NJX - General utility van (90 mph)			
NKA - General utility van (High-security) (100 mph)			
NLX - Newspaper van			
NNX - Courier vehicle			
NPX - General utility van (TPO use)			
NOA - General utility van (100 mph)			
NRA - Container van			
NSA - Post Office sorting van		10+	
NTA - Post Office stowage van			
NUA - Brake Post Office stowage van			

== General references ==
- Rail Magazine Issue 159
- Motive Power Pocket books pub. Platform 5
- British Multiple Units Volume 1 and Volume 3
