= British Rail Class 321 =

British class of electric multiple units

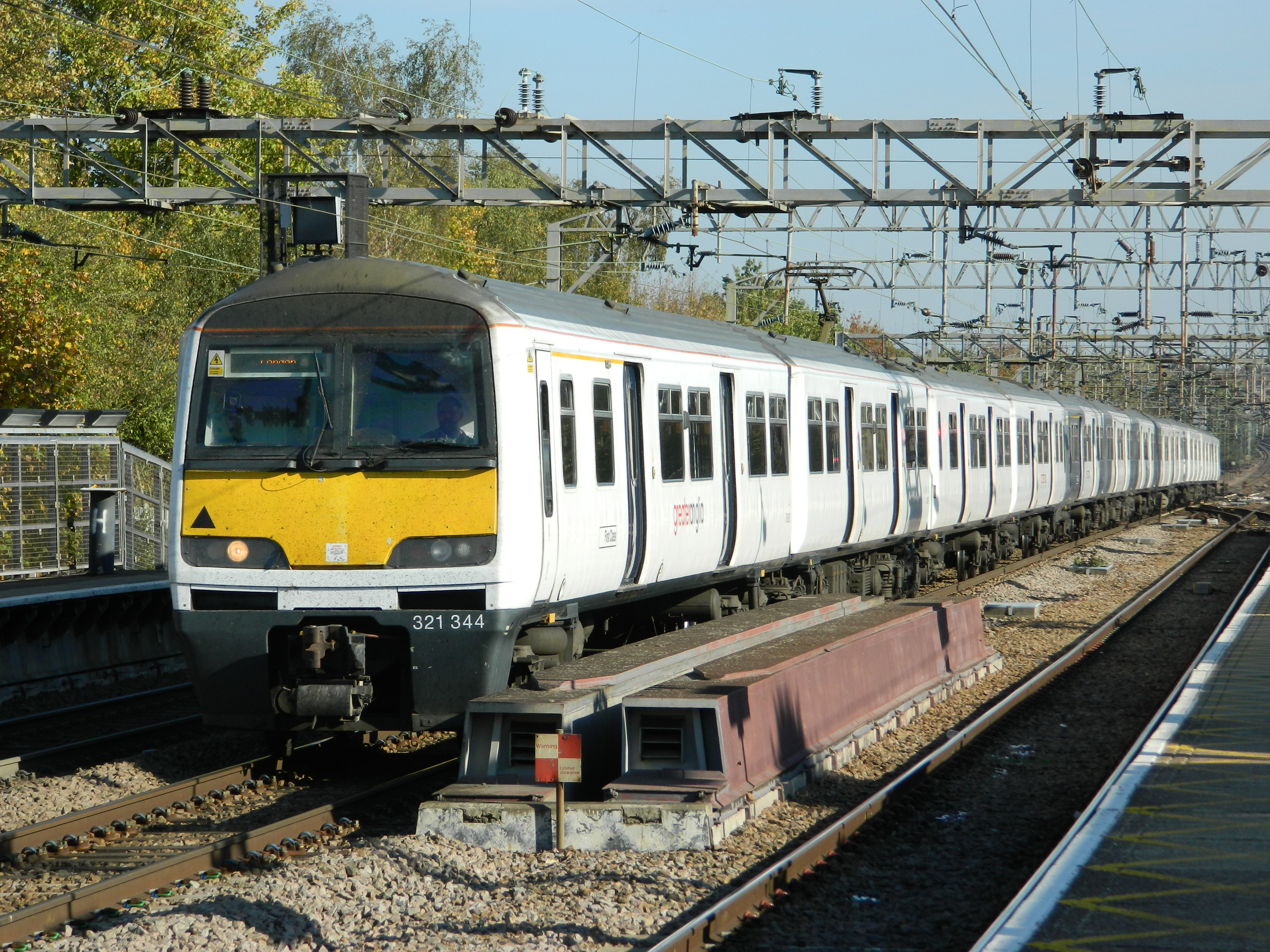
- Greater Anglia Class 321 at Colchester in 2018

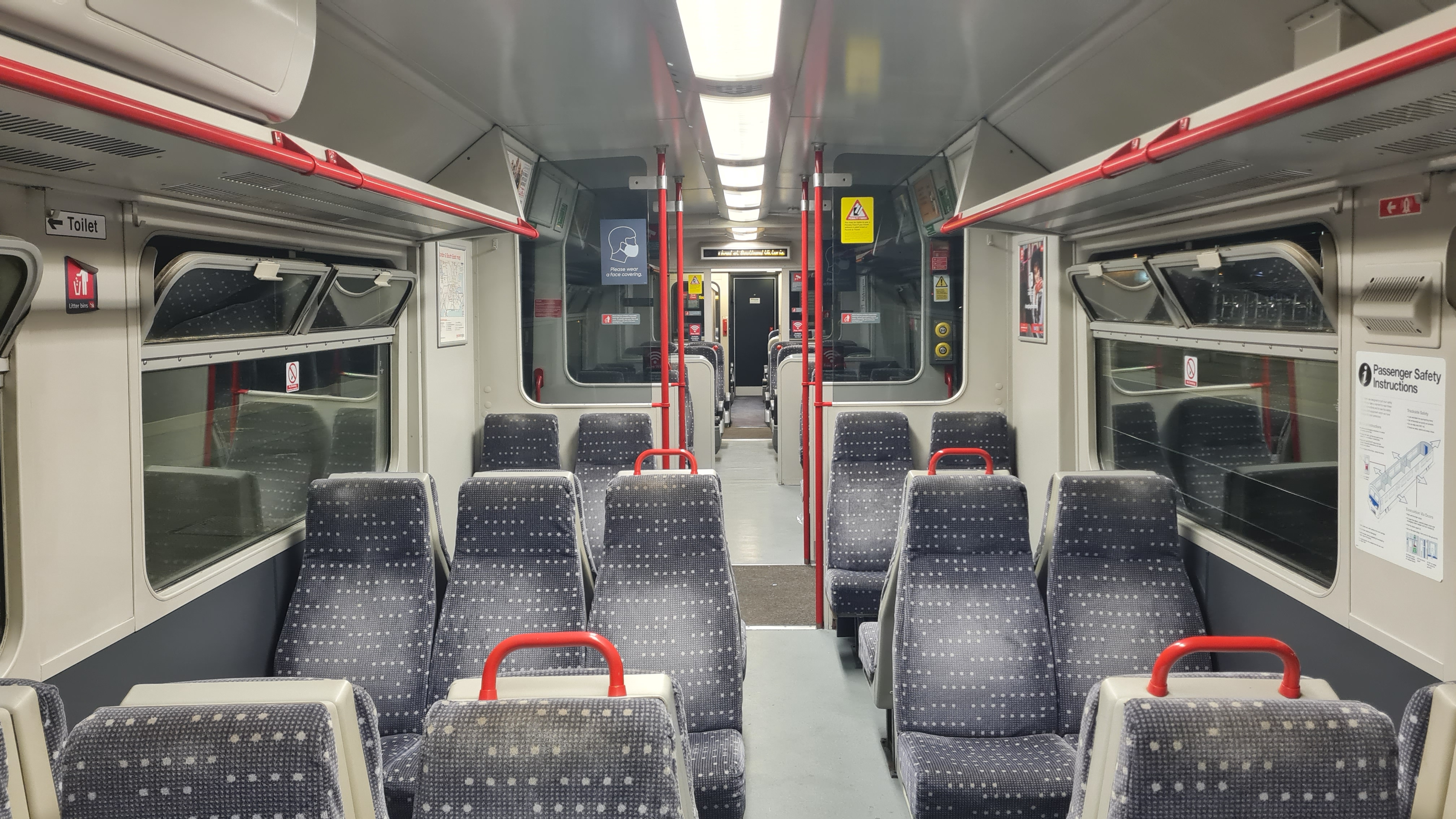
- Standard-class interior of an unrefurbished Greater Anglia unit
- In service: 1988–present
- Manufacturer: British Rail Engineering Limited
- Built at: Holgate Road Works, York
- Family name: BR Second Generation (Mark 3)
- Replaced: Class 307 Class 317 Class 86
- Constructed: 1988–1991
- Refurbished: 2013–2017
- Scrapped: 2020 - 2025
- Number built: 117 (66 × 321/3, 48 × 321/4, and 4 × 321/9)
- Number in service: 9 (plus 12 converted to Cl. 320/4)
- Number scrapped: 96
- Successor: Class 331 (Northern Trains), Class 350 (London Midland), Class 387 (Great Northern), Class 720 (Greater Anglia)
- Formation: 4 cars per unit; 321/3 and /4 units: DTCO-PMSO-TSO-DTSO; 321/9 units: DTSO-PMSO-TSO-DTSO
- Diagram: (See § Vehicle numbering)
- Fleet numbers: 321/3: 321301–321366; 321/4: 321401–321448; 321/9: 321901–321903
- Capacity: As-built: 321/3: 313 seats; (20 first-class, 293 standard); From 2015: 321/3: 303 seats; (16 first-class, 287 standard); 321/4: 299 or 307 seats; (16 or 28 first, 271 or 291 std.); 321/9: 309 seats; (all standard-class)
- Owners: Eversholt Rail Group; Varamis Rail
- Operators: Current: Varamis Rail; Former: Arriva Rail North, Arriva Trains Northern, Central Trains, First Capital Connect, First Great Eastern, Greater Anglia, London Midland, London Overground, National Express East Anglia, Network SouthEast, Northern Rail, Northern Trains, Regional Railways, Silverlink

Specifications
- Car body construction: Steel
- Train length: 80.92 m (265 ft 6 in)
- Car length: DT vehs.: 19.950 m (65 ft 5.4 in); Others: 19.920 m (65 ft 4.3 in)
- Width: 2.816 m (9 ft 2.9 in)
- Height: 3.775 m (12 ft 4.6 in)
- Doors: Double-leaf sliding pocket, each 1.200 m (3 ft 11.2 in) wide (2 per side per car)
- Wheelbase: Over bogie centres: 14.170 m (46 ft 5.9 in)
- Maximum speed: 100 mph (161 km/h)
- Weight: DTCO vehs.: 29.3 t (28.8 long tons; 32.3 short tons); PSMO vehs.: 51.5 t (50.7 long tons; 56.8 short tons); TSO vehs.: 28.8 t (28.3 long tons; 31.7 short tons); DTSO vehs.: 29.1 t (28.6 long tons; 32.1 short tons)
- Traction motors: As built: 4 × Brush TM21-41C, each of 248 kW (332 hp); Renatus: 4 × TSA TME 52-35-4, each of 300 kW (402 hp)
- Power output: As built: 990 kW (1,328 hp); Renatus: 1,200 kW (1,609 hp)
- Acceleration: As built: 0.55 m/s^{2} (1.2 mph/s); Renatus: 0.60 m/s^{2} (1.3 mph/s)
- Electric system: 25 kV 50 Hz AC overhead
- Current collection: Pantograph (Note: Brecknell Willis Pantograph fitted on 321/3 units)
- UIC classification: 2′2′+Bo′Bo′+2′2′+2′2′
- Bogies: Powered: BREL P7-4; Unpowered: BREL T3-7
- Minimum turning radius: 71 m (232 ft 11 in)
- Braking system: Electro-pneumatic (disc)
- Safety systems: AWS; TPWS
- Coupling system: Tightlock
- Multiple working: With Classes 317–322
- Track gauge: 1,435 mm (4 ft 8 1/2 in) standard gauge

Notes/references
- Specifications as at October 1988 except where otherwise noted.

The British Rail Class 321 is a class of electric multiple unit (EMU) passenger trains built by British Rail Engineering Limited's York Carriage Works in three batches between 1988 and 1991 for Network SouthEast and Regional Railways. The class uses alternating current (AC) overhead electrification. The design was successful and led to the development of the similar Class 320 and Class 322.

After operating for various trains operating companies after the privatisation of British Rail, they were latterly operated by Greater Anglia until April 2023. Some have been converted to Class 320 and are operated by ScotRail.

== Description ==
Three sub-classes were built. The first two were built for the Network SouthEast sector for operation on services from London Liverpool Street and London Euston, while the third was built for Regional Railways for use on West Yorkshire Passenger Transport Executive services from Leeds. As part of the privatisation of British Rail, ownership of the class passed from British Rail to the Eversholt Rail Group in April 1994.

Each unit consists of four carriages: (DTC-PMS-TS-DTS) all units have a maximum speed of 100 mph (161 km/h).

They have been modified by the different rail companies which use them. The modifications include new seats, paintwork, lighting and passenger information systems.

The trains have been nicknamed "Dusty Bins" by some enthusiasts, after the TV game show "3-2-1" which featured a mascot called "Dusty Bin".

=== Class 321/3 ===
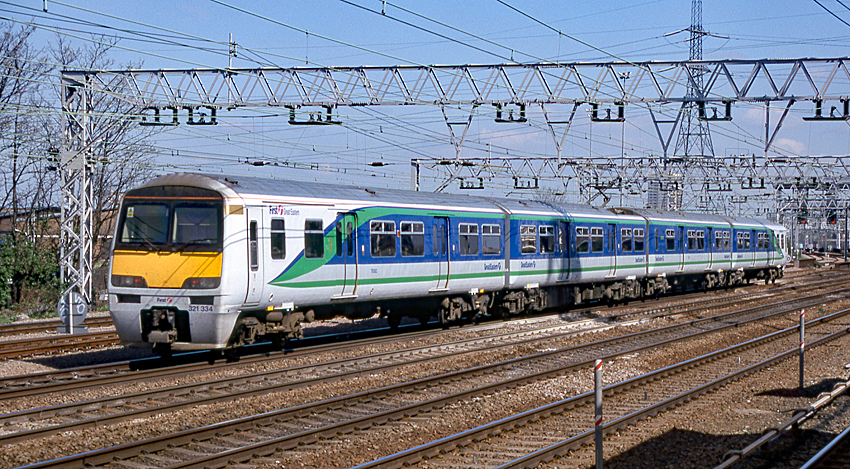
A Class 321/3 at Pudding Mill Lane in First Great Eastern livery, 1999

In September 1987, Network SouthEast ordered 46 four-car units for use on services from London Liverpool Street to Cambridge and Southend Victoria, which became Class 321/3. The first was unveiled on 15 September 1988. A further 20 were ordered later. Units were numbered 321301–321366. The DTSO vehicle was equipped with a small area between the driver's cab and the first set of doors that could be used for the conveyance of parcels or luggage; this was indicated by a P following the unit number on the front of that vehicle.

These units replaced slam-door Class 305, Class 307, Class 308 and Class 309 units on trains to Clacton and Southend-on-Sea; they worked services on the newly electrified routes to Ipswich and Harwich Town. They also displaced many Class 312 slam-door units, which moved over to the London, Tilbury and Southend line. Some of the Class 309s were retained until 1994, and 24 of the newer Class 312 units were retained long-term to work services to Walton-on-the-Naze and peak services to Clacton, Ipswich and Witham. Units carried Network SouthEast livery from new.

The first of 30 321/3 units to be refurbished at Doncaster Works, as part of the Renatus project – which modernised the stock with features such as new air conditioning and heating, seating and wi-fi – was completed in December 2016.

=== Class 321/4 ===
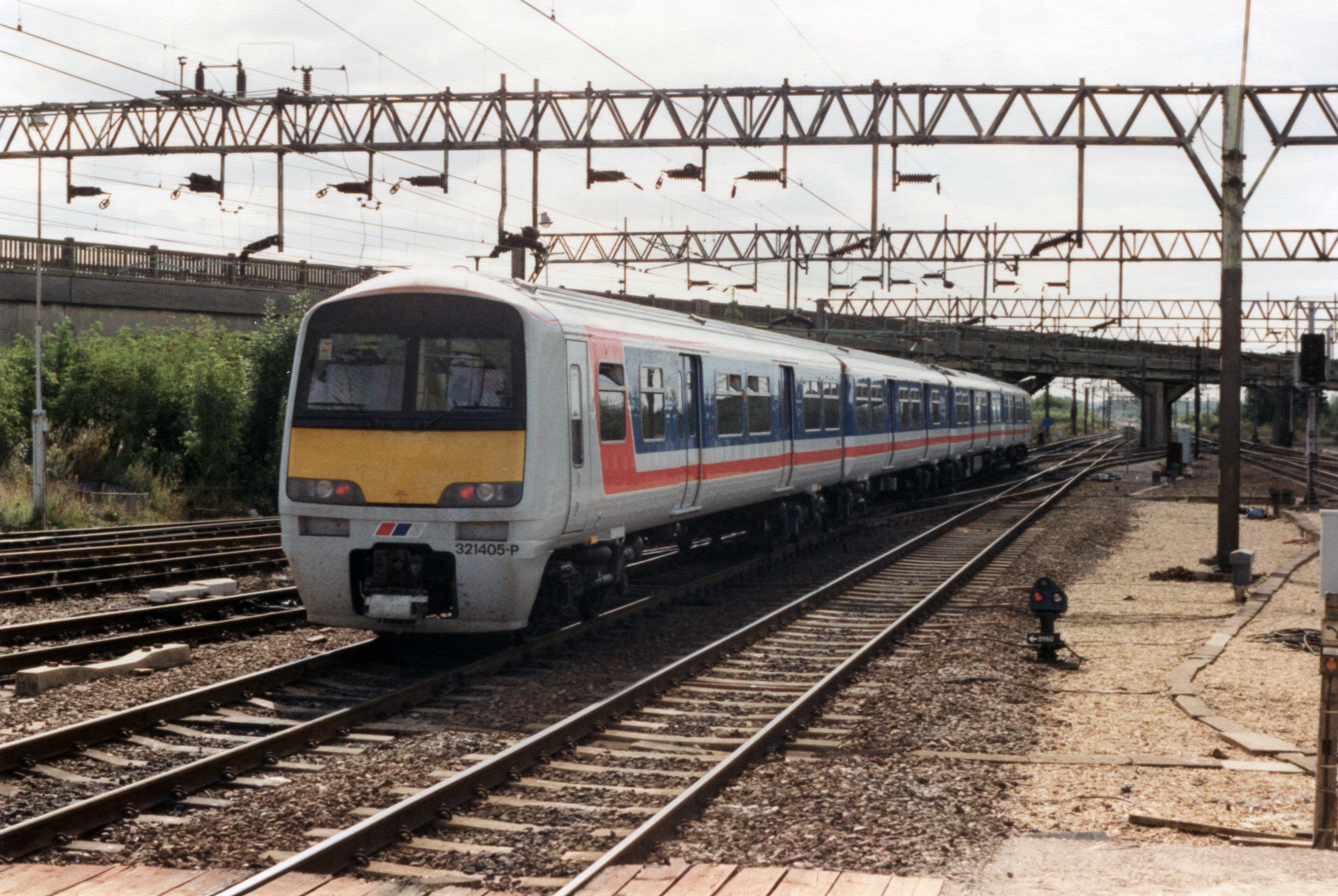
A Class 321/4 in Network SouthEast livery at Bletchley (note the letter P after unit number)

In October 1988, a second batch of 30 was ordered. It was intended that 25 be used on Great Eastern Main Line services and five on West Coast Main Line services, but, in the event, all were delivered to Bletchley TMD for use on the latter. A further 18 followed. Units were numbered 321401–321448. The first was delivered in July 1989. As with subclass /3 units, the DTSO vehicles were equipped with a parcels area indicated by suffixing a P to the unit number.

These were built for outer-suburban services on the West Coast Main Line, from London Euston to Northampton, Rugby and Birmingham New Street. They displaced the then-recently cascaded Class 317s dating from 1981, which had themselves only just been introduced to the route to replace Class 310s.

Eleven 321/4s were transferred for Great Eastern Main Line services. Following this, their first class area was reduced in size to standardise with the 321/3s in use on that route. This involved removing the centre partition and double doors and reupholstering the first class style 2+2 seats (which were then retained) in the declassified area into the same fabric as the standard class seats. Later, the first class 2+2 seats in this declassified area were replaced with the standard style 2+3 seating. These 11 were also fitted with a facility to lock out the power door operation within the unit (a basic kind of selective operation) to permit operation of 12-car trains on the Braintree and Southminster branch lines, where some platforms were only long enough for 8-car trains.

The 11 Great Eastern sets passed to First Great Eastern in January 1997, moving with the franchise to National Express East Anglia in April 2004 and Greater Anglia in February 2012. The 37 West Coast sets passed to Silverlink in January 1997, moving with the franchise to London Midland in November 2007. In 2006, 321407 and 321423 were loaned by Silverlink to Northern Rail, while the 321/9s were being overhauled. In 2007, 321408 and 321428 were loaned by Silverlink to c2c operating services out of Fenchurch Street, while one Class 357 was repaired and another was undergoing tests in the Czech Republic.

Following the delivery of the Class 350/2 fleet, 13 Class 321/4s (401–410, 418–420) were transferred from London Midland to First Capital Connect and overhauled by Wabtec's Doncaster Works. These passed with the franchise to Great Northern in September 2014. London Midland also released 17 (421–437) for transfer to National Express East Anglia. The remaining seven (411–417) passed to Abellio ScotRail in 2015, after being converted to three-car Class 320/4 at Doncaster Works.

In 2017, ten units (402, 405–410, 418–420) were transferred from Great Northern to Greater Anglia. As at May 2018 the remaining three (401, 403, 404) are to be converted by Wabtec at Kilmarnock to Class 320/4 for use with Abellio ScotRail. Another two were to follow.

=== Class 321/9 ===
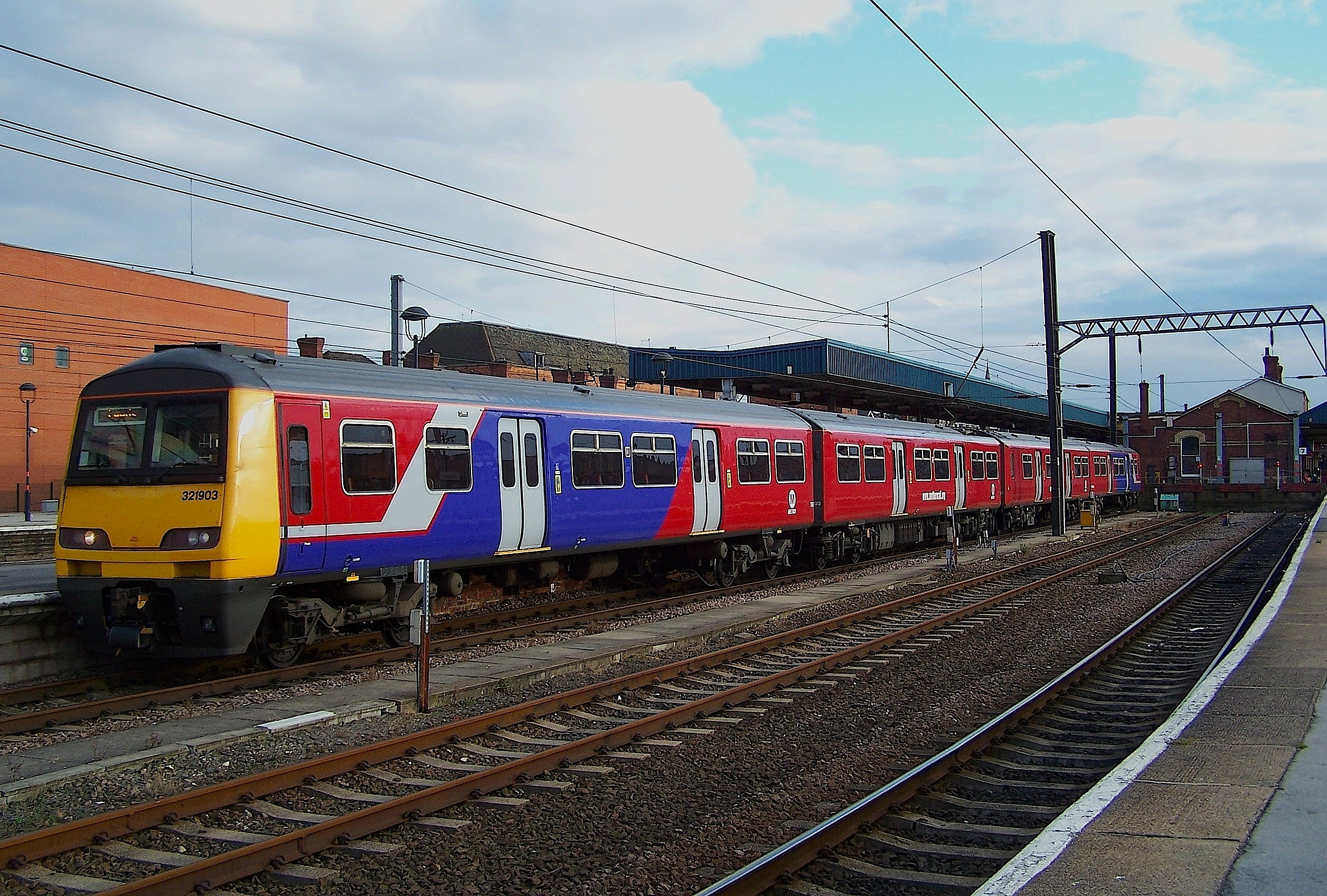
A Class 321/9 in West Yorkshire PTE livery at Doncaster

The final batch of three Class 321 units was constructed in 1991 and classified subclass /9. These units had a similar formation to the earlier units except that there was no first class seating. They were ordered by Regional Railways for use on West Yorkshire Passenger Transport Executive services on the newly electrified Doncaster to Leeds route, entering service in 1993. From 1995, they also worked on Wharfedale line services from Leeds to Ilkley. In March 1997, they passed with the Regional Railways North East franchise to Northern Spirit, which became Arriva Trains Northern in April 2001. In June 1998, they were loaned to GNER to operate Leeds to London King's Cross services, while its InterCity 225 fleet was grounded with mechanical issues. All three passed with the franchise to Northern Rail in December 2004.

The Class 321/9 units were refurbished at Hunslet-Barclay in Kilmarnock from late 2006 to early 2007. The refurbishment included a new livery, refurbished interiors and reliability improvements, similar to the Class 322 EMUs, which were also refurbished at Kilmarnock.

The units transferred to Arriva Rail North in April 2016 and then Northern Trains on 1 March 2020. With the Class 331s now in service, the Class 321/9s were transferred to Greater Anglia to allow their Class 360s to move to East Midlands Railway.

All 321/9 units were scrapped in 2022.

== Current operations ==
=== Varamis Rail ===
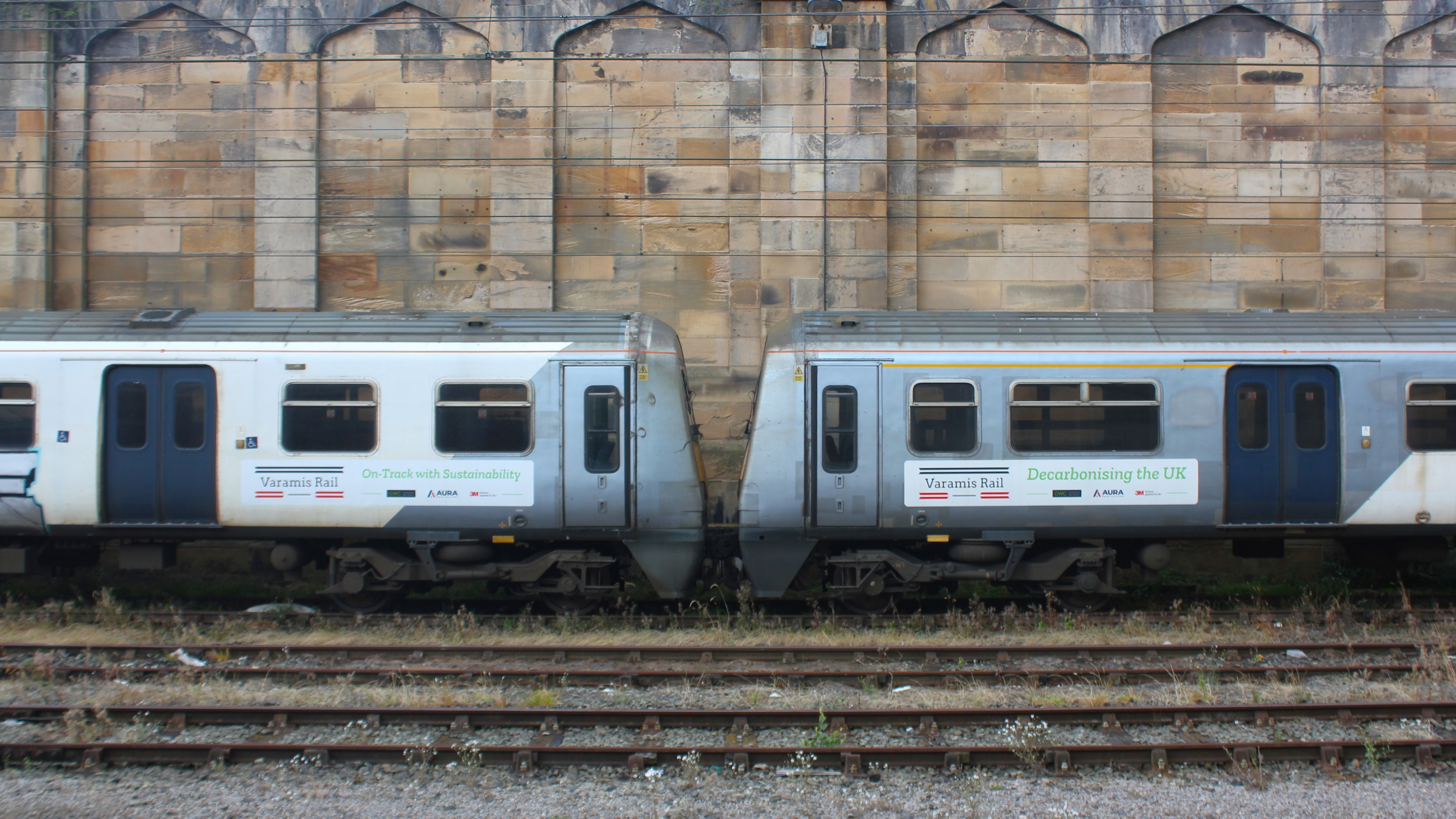
Units 321428 and 321429 with Varamis Rail branding

In March 2021, Eversholt Rail Group announced its intention to convert 321334 for use as a parcels train. In July 2021, Eversholt and Wabtec revealed 321334 in the Swift Express livery. If successful further units could be converted.

In November 2021, it was announced that four more Class 321s would be converted to Swift Express, with the first of these units expected to be delivered in February 2022. In 2022, it was announced that an unnamed customer had secured its first unit, later confirmed as Varamis Rail, which launched a service between Scotland and Birmingham in January using unit 321334. The final two were scheduled to be completed in September 2022. In September 2023, it was announced that Eversholt had abandoned the Swift Express project despite four Class 321 units having been converted. Varamis Rail announced that it was considering taking over the project. In early 2024, Varamis Rail bought the four converted units from Eversholt.

== Former operations ==
=== Silverlink / London Midland / London Overground ===
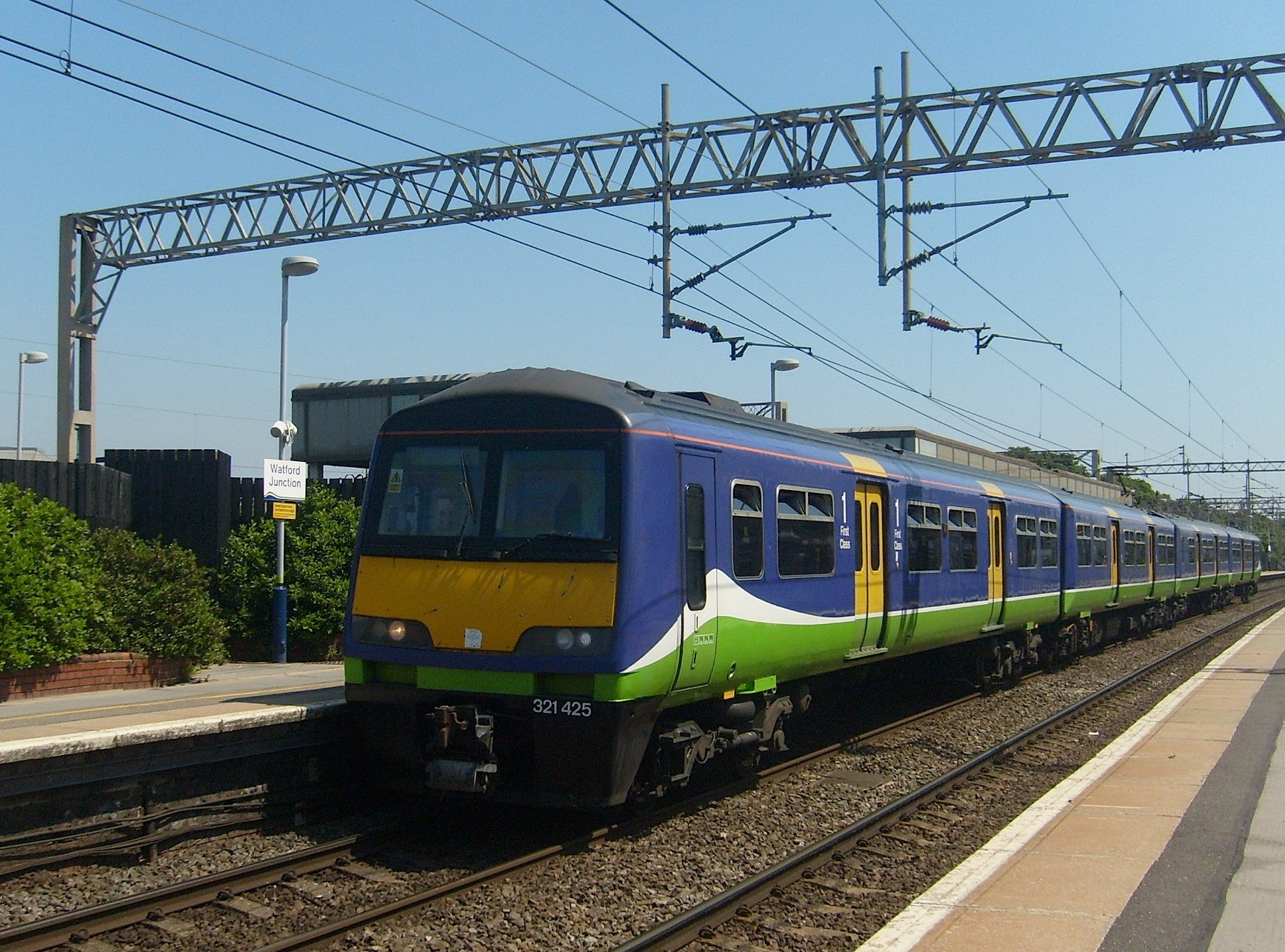
A Silverlink-liveried Class 321 at Watford Junction

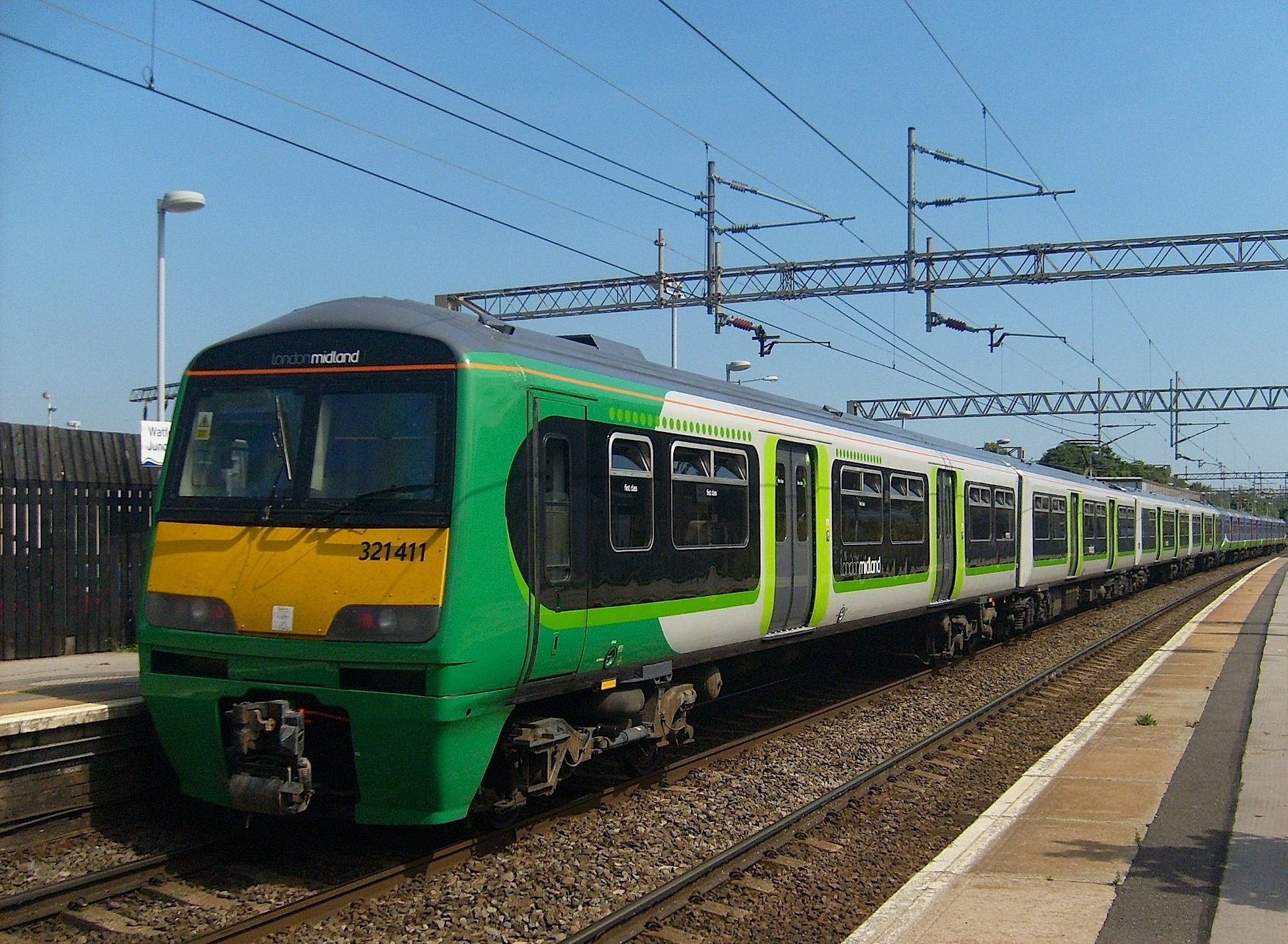
A London Midland Class 321 at Watford Junction

Silverlink inherited 37 of the 48 Class 321/4 units. In September 2003, their Class 321 units were temporarily withdrawn following the discovery of loose bolts on brake discs in some units.

In September 2004, London Euston to Birmingham local services were divided into two separate services: Silverlink retained London to Northampton services, while fellow National Express subsidiary Central Trains took over all local services between Northampton and Birmingham. Initially, Central Trains hired Class 321 units from Silverlink to work their new services, but the arrival of Class 350/1s meant that very few Class 321 units were then required.

To accommodate this sub-lease, three Class 321/3 units were transferred from National Express East Anglia to Silverlink. These were not permitted north of Rugby, due to lack of the National Radio Network system (Eastern Region units only had the Cab Secure Radio System used for Driver Only Operated Passenger services) and therefore could not be used on Central Trains services (although they occasionally appeared on services to Rugby at weekends, due to the line being closed to Birmingham New Street). This ceased in late 2005, with the introduction of Class 350 trains on the Birmingham to Liverpool route. One of these sub-leased units was involved in a low-speed derailment at Watford Yard.

In May 2007, Central Trains began using Class 321 units on some morning services from Birmingham New Street to Walsall.

In November 2007, London Midland took over operation of the Class 321 fleet previously used by Silverlink and Central Trains. An order was placed by London Midland for 37 Class 350/2s to replace the Class 321s.

London Midland withdrew most units, retaining seven (411–417). They were used for peak hour workings between London Euston and Northampton and on the Abbey line. In 2015, all seven were withdrawn for transfer to Abellio ScotRail to operate on Glasgow suburban lines, with the last withdrawn on 20 September 2015. They were replaced by Class 319s. Two (413/414) briefly operated for London Overground Rail Operations in late 2015, being revinyled in London Overground livery. The cascaded Class 321s were reformed to three-car units, by removing the TSO vehicle and reclassified as Class 320/4s.

=== First Capital Connect / Great Northern ===
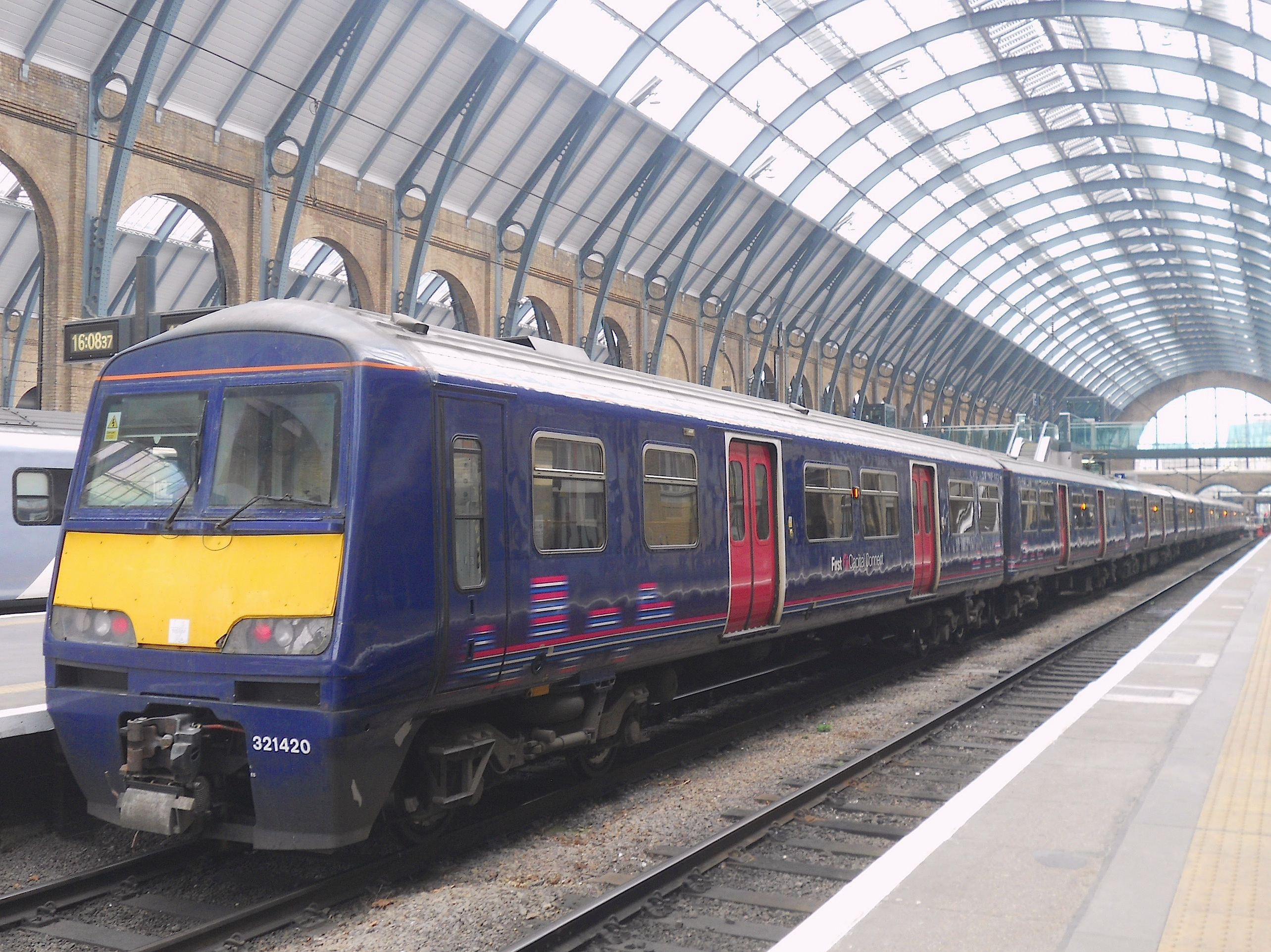
A First Capital Connect Class 321 at London King's Cross

First Capital Connect received thirteen units (401–410, 418–420) from London Midland, following deliveries of the new Class 350/2s. The units worked on the Great Northern services from London King's Cross to Peterborough and Cambridge from December 2010 until May 2017. They passed with the franchise to Great Northern in September 2014.

All were replaced in 2016 by Class 387s, cascaded from the Thameslink route. Ten units (402, 405–410 and 418–420) moved to Ilford depot for use by Greater Anglia, with the remaining three (401, 403, 404) converted to Class 320/4s for Abellio ScotRail.

=== Arriva Trains Northern/ Northern Rail/ Arriva Rail/ Northern Trains ===
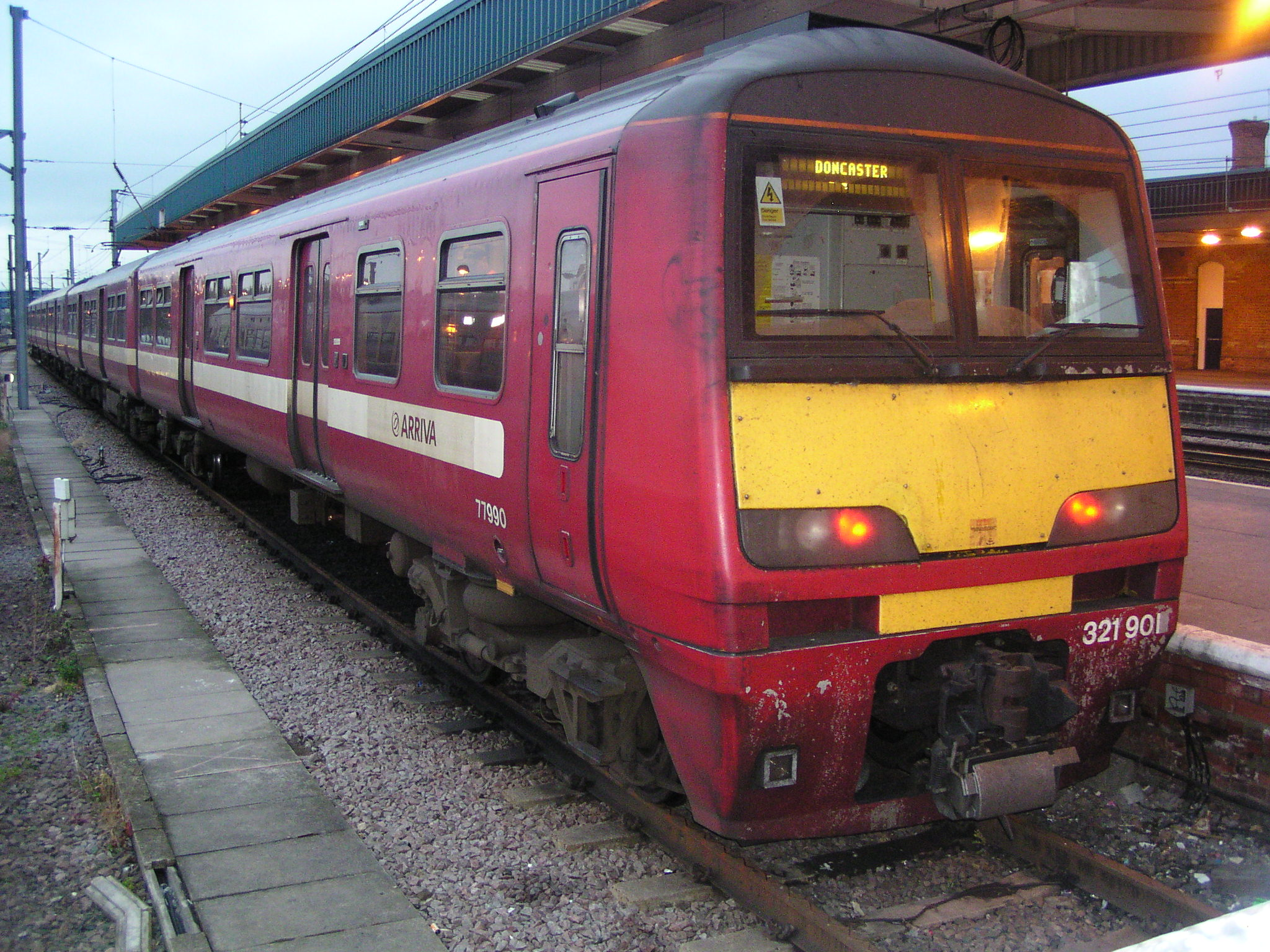
An Arriva Trains Northern Class 321 at Doncaster in June 2004

Arriva Trains Northern inherited three Class 321/9 units. These units operated on the Leeds to Doncaster Wakefield line service and occasionally on the Wharfedale and Airedale lines alongside Class 322s and 333s. All passed on to Northern Rail in 2004 and were refurbished in 2006/07. All passed on to Arriva Rail North and then with the franchise to Northern Trains, all were replaced by Class 331s with the last withdrawn in 2020. These were transferred to Greater Anglia for temporary use until replaced by Class 720s.

=== Greater Anglia ===
First Great Eastern inherited all 66 Class 321/3 and 11 Class 321/4. The East Anglia franchise was subsequently taken over by National Express East Anglia, initially branded 'one', and then subsequently by Greater Anglia. A further 16 were added, upon release from London Midland. In 2016, ten of the sets formerly operated by Great Northern also transferred to Greater Anglia.

An additional three units, all Class 321/9s, were transferred to Greater Anglia from Northern Trains in 2020 in order to provide capacity during the introduction of GA's new Class 720 fleet.

The 321s were primarily used for services from London Liverpool Street to Braintree, Southend Victoria, Southminster, Ipswich (extending to Norwich during peak time), Walton-on-the-Naze, Clacton-on-Sea and Colchester Town, but could operate services on any electrified route if other trains failed. These operated as four, eight or twelve-car sets.

After being awarded the new East Anglia franchise in August 2016, Greater Anglia placed an order for Class 720s, which replaced the 321s despite the Renatus project. The first of the new trains entered service in November 2020.

From early 2023, the units only operated services from Manningtree to Harwich Town and from Colchester to Walton-on-the-Naze, alongside Class 720 units on the latter, as well as one service each day between Thorpe-le-Soken and Walton-on-the-Naze.

The last scheduled Class 321 workings took place on 3 April 2023, with the class subsequently being used on an ad-hoc basis. Following a farewell tour on 29 April 2023, Greater Anglia completely withdrew its Class 321 fleet.

== Renatus project ==
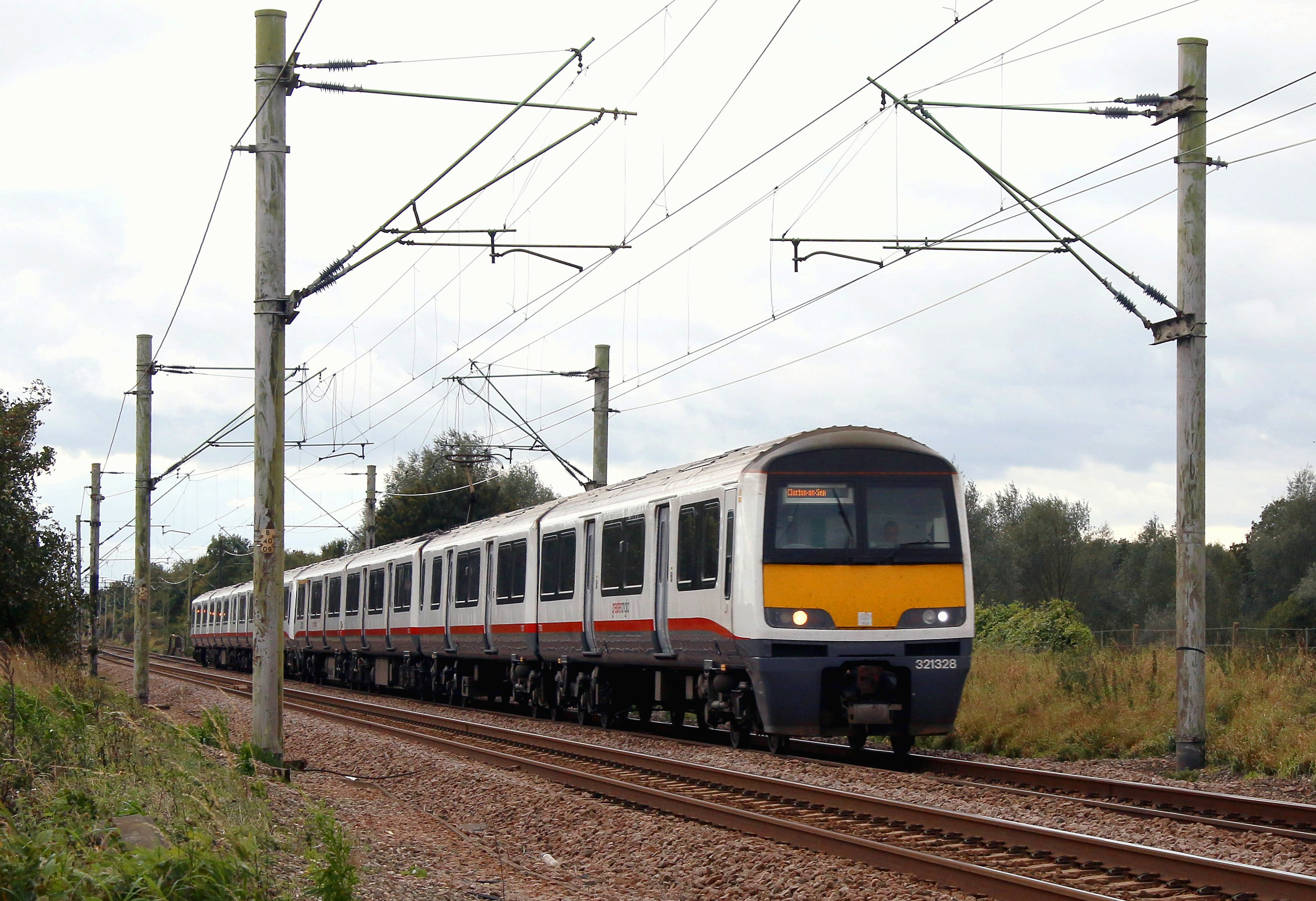
A pair of refurbished Class 321 Renatus units on a service to Clacton-on-Sea in 2021

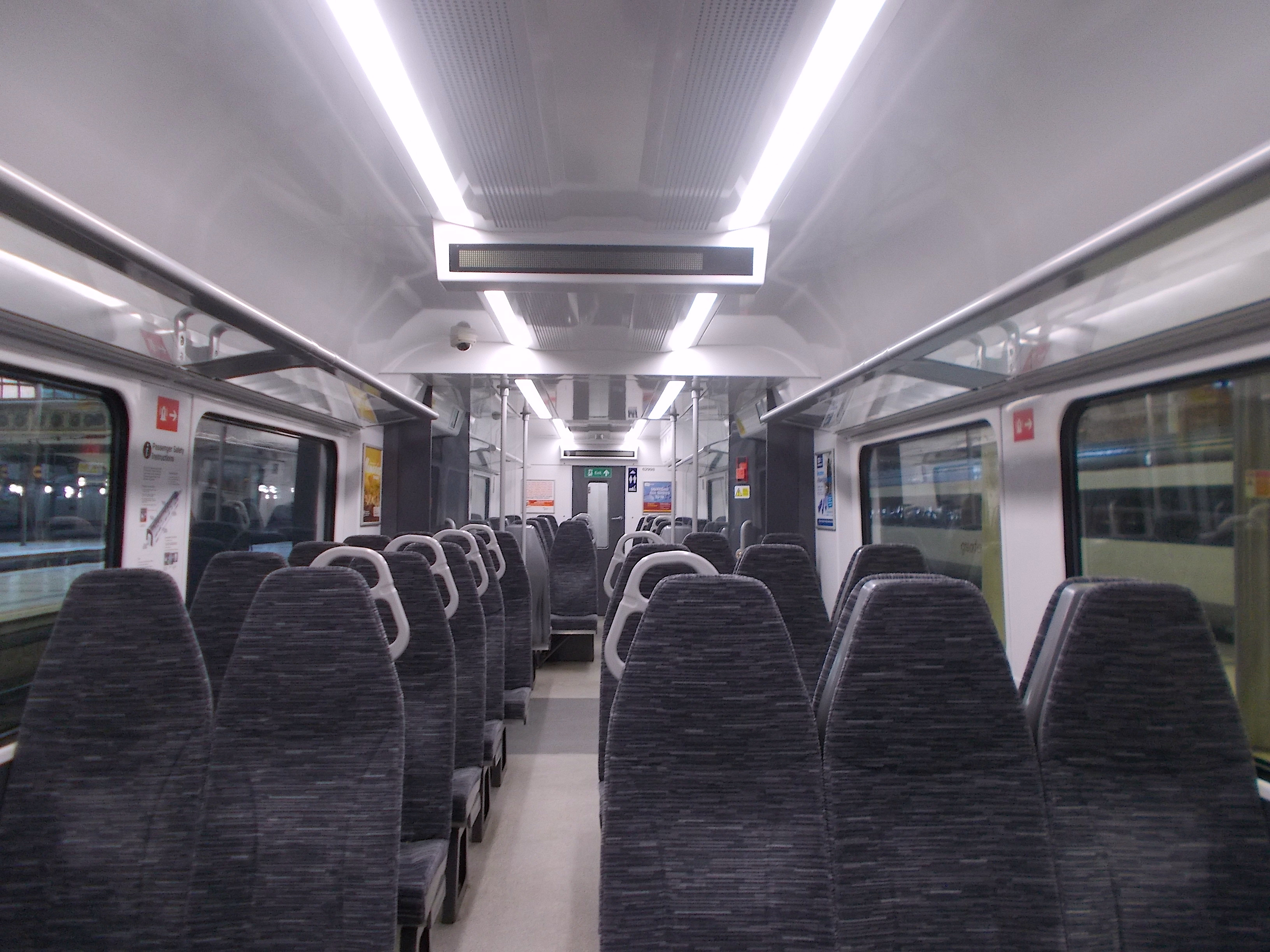
The interior of standard class aboard a Renatus-refurbished Class 321

In December 2013, Eversholt rebuilt 321448 as a demonstrator at Doncaster Works for a proposed upgrade. It featured a new livery, completely refitted interior including two examples of sitting arrangements including 2+2 and 2+3, and a new first class area. The demonstrator also featured air conditioning, not previously seen on Class 321 trains, along with fixed panel windows to replace opening windows and a new Vossloh Kiepe traction package.

The production run covered 30 units. The Vossloh Kiepe traction package was installed at Wolverton Works with the rest of the work performed at Doncaster. The first was completed in December 2016. In 2017, the prototype returned to Doncaster to be modified to the same specifications as the production units, including being refitted with hopper windows.

== Aborted proposals ==
=== Battery conversion ===
In 2022, it was announced that Eversholt and Vivarail were working on a design to convert some Class 321s to battery units that could operate between 20 and 30 miles (32 and 48 km) on battery power. The battery units were planned to be used on routes in Scotland. However, due to Vivarail going into administration in December 2022, the project was cancelled.

=== Hydrogen conversion ===
In May 2018, plans were announced by Eversholt and Alstom to convert a number of Class 321 units to run on hydrogen fuel-cells, as a way of replacing diesel-powered trains on lines that are unlikely to be electrified. The details of the conversion project, dubbed 'Breeze', were published in January 2019, with an expectation that units could be ready for service in 2022 – although this later slipped to 2024.

In November 2021, Alstom and Eversholt announced that they had decided to switch their primary focus to developing a hydrogen-fuelled variant of Alstom's Aventra EMU, on the grounds that the pool of convertible Class 321 units was too small to support the market they envisaged for hydrogen-powered trains in the UK, and that the Aventra's advanced technology and reduced requirement for routine maintenance were advantages in both manufacture and operations. Although the companies stated that they would maintain the "option" of converting existing trains in the future, the Breeze project was ended in the first half of 2022 and at least one of the Class 321 units selected for conversion (321448) was sent for scrapping.

== Further use ==
In April 2023, Eastern Rail Services acquired 321434 with the intent of making it available for filming projects.

== Fleet details ==
Class	Operator	Qty.	Year built	Unit nos.
321/3	Varamis Rail	3	1988–1990	321334, 321339, 321341
321/3	Network Rail	2 vehicles	1988–1990	321332 (Note: vehicles 71911 and 77884.)
321/3	Scrapped	63	1988–1990	321301-321333, (Note: vehicles 63006 and 78080 of 321332.) 321335-321338, 321340, 321342–321366
321/4	Converted to Class 320/4	12	1989–1990	321401, 321403–321404, 321411–321418, 321420
321/4	Eastern Rail Services	1	1989–1990	321434
321/4	Varamis Rail	5	1989–1990	321407, 321419, 321428-321429, 321440
321/4	Scrapped	30	1989–1990	321402, 321405–406, 321408-321410, 321421–321427, 321430-321433, 321435–321439, 321441-321448
321/9	Scrapped	3	1991	321901–321903

=== Vehicle numbering ===
Individual vehicles are numbered in the ranges as follows:

Class 321/3 vehicles
Vehicle Detail	DTCO	PMSO	TSO	DTSO
Diagram	EE308	EC210	EH235	EE236
Number range	78049–78094, 78131–78150	62975–63020, 63105–63124	71880–71925, 71991–72010	77853–77898, 78280–78299

Class 321/4 vehicles
Vehicle Detail	DTCO	PMSO	TSO	DTSO
Diagram	To be confirmed			
Number range	78095–78130, 78151–78162	63063–63092, 63099–63104, 63125–63136	71949–71978, 71985–71990, 72011–72022	77943–77972, 78274–78279, 78300–78311

Class 321/9 vehicles
Vehicle Detail	DTSO(A)	PMSO	TSO	DTSO(B)
Diagram	To be confirmed			
Number range	77990–77992	63153–63155	72128–72130	77993–77995

=== Named units ===
Some units received names.

- 321312: Southend-on-Sea
- 321321: NSPCC Essex Full Stop
- 321334: Amsterdam
- 321336: Geoffrey Freeman Allen
- 321342: R Barnes
- 321343: RSA Railway Study Association
- 321351: London Southend Airport (Formerly Gurkha)
- 321361: Phoenix
- 321403: Stewart Fleming Signalman King's Cross
- 321407: Hertfordshire WRVS
- 321409: Dame Alice Owen's School 400 years of learning
- 321413: Bill Green
- 321420 We Are Proud Supporters of Movember
- 321425: Silver Service (formerly Bletchley Seven)
- 321427: Major Tim Warr
- 321428: The Essex Commuter
- 321439: Chelmsford Cathedral Festival
- 321444: Essex Lifeboats
- 321446: George Mullings

== Accidents and incidents ==
In February 2003, unit 321 418 was derailed at Hemel Hempstead South Junction.
