= British Rail Class 325 =

British bulk mail carrying electric train

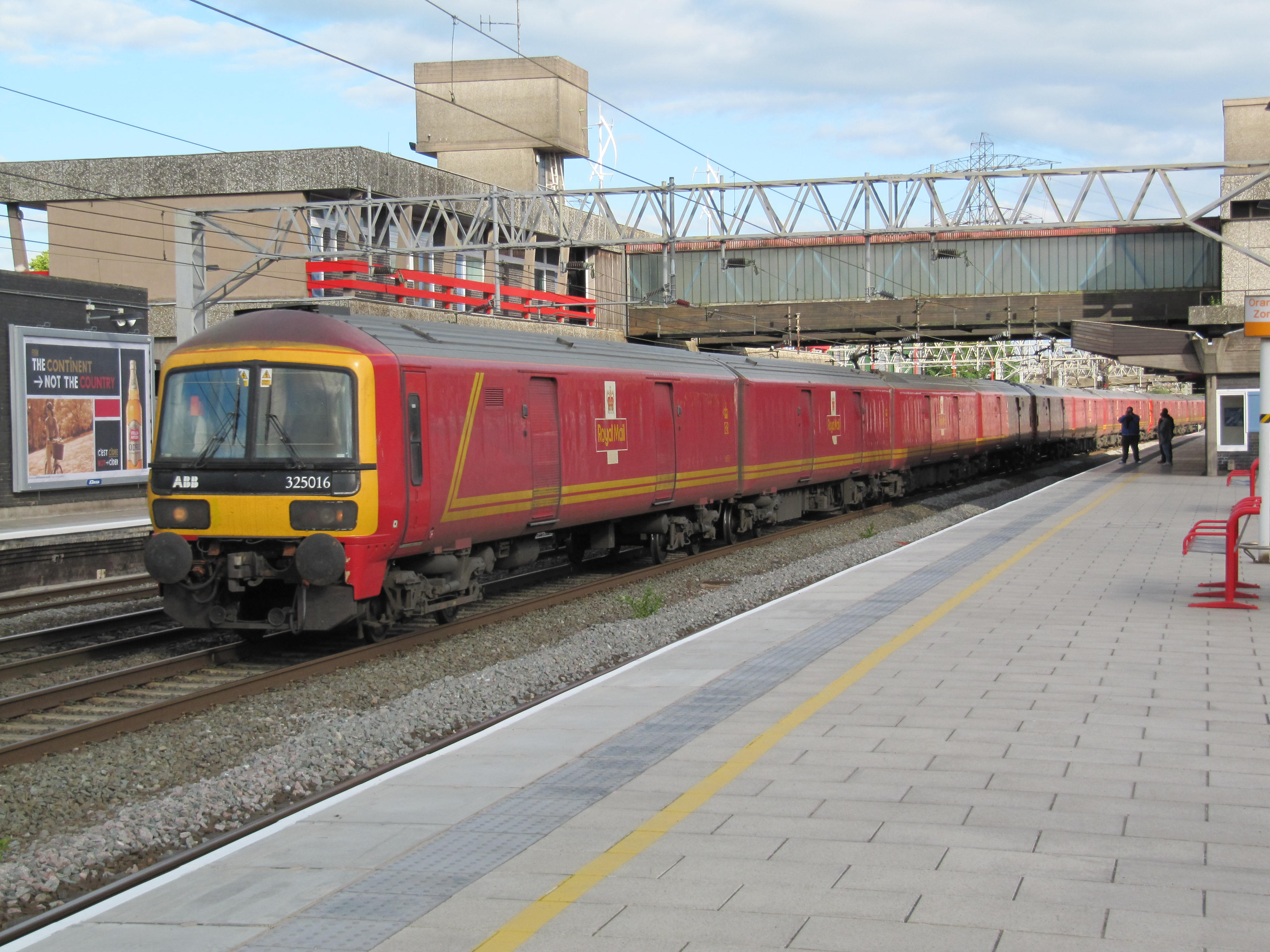
- Three Class 325 units passing through Stafford in 2011
- In service: Previous Operators: 1996–21 September 2024; TBA: Varamis Rail
- Manufacturer: ABB Transportation
- Built at: Derby Litchurch Lane Works
- Family name: BR Second Generation (Mark 3)
- Constructed: 1995–1996
- Number built: 16
- Number scrapped: 10
- Formation: 4 cars per unit: DTV(A)-PMV-TAV-DTV(B)
- Fleet numbers: 325001–325016
- Capacity: 235 "York" trolleys
- Owners: Current: Varamis Rail; Former: Royal Mail
- Operators: Current: Varamis Rail; Former: DB Cargo UK
- Depot: Crewe IEMD

Specifications
- Car body construction: Steel
- Train length: 80.8 m (265 ft 1 in)
- Car length: DT vehs.: 19.95 m (65 ft 5 in); Others: 19.92 m (65 ft 4 in)
- Width: 2.82 m (9 ft 3 in)
- Height: 3.78 m (12 ft 5 in)
- Maximum speed: 100 mph (161 km/h)
- Weight: DTV vehs.: 29.1 t (28.6 LT; 32.1 ST); PMV vehs.: 49.5 t (48.7 LT; 54.6 ST); TAV vehs.: 30.7 t (30.2 LT; 33.8 ST); Total: 138.4 t (136.2 LT; 152.6 ST)
- Traction system: GTO thyristor
- Traction motors: 4 × GEC G315BZ
- Power output: 990 kW (1,330 hp)
- Electric systems: 25 kV 50 Hz AC overhead; 750 V DC third rail
- Current collection: Pantograph (AC) (Brecknell Willis high-speed); Contact shoe (DC)
- UIC classification: 2′2′+Bo′Bo′+2′2′+2′2′
- Bogies: Powered: BREL P7; Unpowered: BREL T3-16
- Braking system: Electro-pneumatic (disc)
- Safety systems: AWS; TPWS
- Coupling system: Drop-head Buckeye
- Multiple working: Within class (up to 3 units total)
- Track gauge: 1,435 mm (4 ft 8 1/2 in) standard gauge

Notes/references
- Data sourced from except where otherwise noted.

The British Rail Class 325 is an electric multiple unit (EMU) train owned by Royal Mail. The trains were operated from 1995 to 2024 for the Royal Mail to carry bulk mail. The class consists of four-car sets with dual-voltage 25 kV (AC) and 750 V (DC) power. While the Class 325 cabs bear a resemblance to the Networker family of DMUs and EMUs, the Class 325 is based on the Class 319.

== History ==
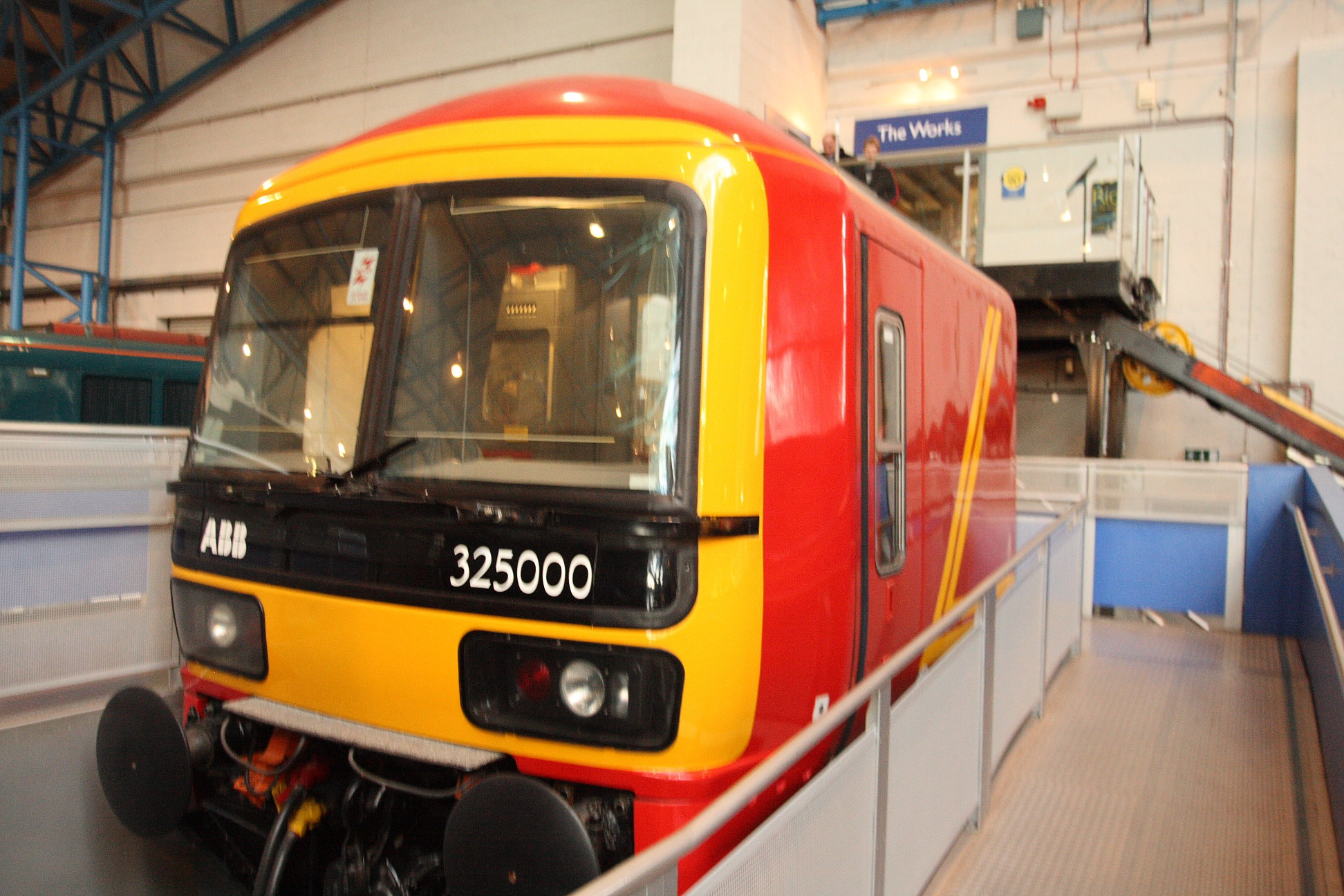
Mockup of Class 325 cab

These units, which were ordered in 1994, were initially given the TOPS classification Class 350 which was changed to Class 325 before the trains entered service.

The 16 units were built at ABB Derby between 1995 and 1996. They are similar to Class 319 units, sharing the same traction equipment and body design, but are fitted with cabs of the same design as the ABB Networker family.

The units entered into service carrying parcels and mail from London to Glasgow and Edinburgh at 100 mph (160 km/h). They are based at Crewe IEMD – International Electric Maintenance Depot.

== Operations ==
At launch, the trains were operated by British Rail's parcel service, Rail Express Systems (RES). With the Privatisation of British Rail operation was transferred to English Welsh & Scottish Railway. Such work continued alongside Class 86 locomotives up the West Coast Main Line and East Coast Main Line until 2003, when Royal Mail withdrew the postal contracts, resulting in decreasing use until the units entered storage following the end of work.

GBRf's contract expired in 2010. A new contract for Royal Mail operations, and responsibility for managing the Class 325 fleet, was won by DB Schenker. As of June 2010, seven trains were to be run a day, between London, Warrington and Glasgow via the West Coast Main Line, with capacity to be flexible as required. The sets can be worked together to make up four-, eight- or twelve-car trains.

In 2012, unit number 325010, which had been damaged and was stored as a source of spares for the rest of the fleet, had been scrapped.

On 14 June 2024, services from Low Fell to Willesden were withdrawn.

In July 2024, Royal Mail announced that it would stop moving mail by its own rail fleet in October 2024, citing cost grounds. It stated that “Royal Mail will continue to use rail services to transport mail across the country, however our own freight trains are at the end of their operational lives."

== Fleet details ==
Class	Operator	Qty.	Year built	Cars per unit	Unit nos.
325	Varamis Rail	6	1995–1996	4	325001–325002, 325005, 325011, 325014-325015
325	Scrapped	10	1995–1996	4	325003-325004 325006-325010, 325012-325013, 325016

=== Vehicle numbering ===
Individual vehicles are numbered in the ranges as follows:

DTV	PMV	TAV
68300–68331	68340–68355	68360–68375

DTV(A) vehicles take the even numbers from the DTV range, while DTV(B) vehicles take the odd numbers.

=== Illustration ===
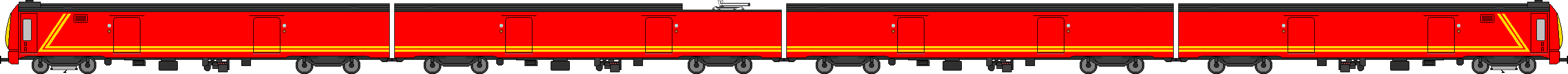
Side-profile illustration of a Royal Mail Class 325 unit (without Royal Mail logos)

=== Named units ===
Some units received names:

- 325002 Royal Mail North Wales & North West
- 325006 John Grierson (scrapped)
- 325008 Peter Howarth CBE (scrapped)

== See also ==
- SNCF TGV La Poste, 270 km/h Postal version of the TGV Sud Est used in France.
- FS Class ETR 500, in freight operation since October 2018. Maximum speed is 300 km/h, average speed is 180 km/h.
- Freight Multiple Unit
