= List of railway stations in Essex =

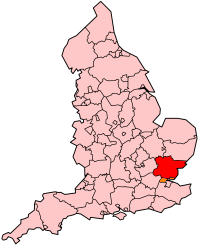
Map showing the location of Essex within England

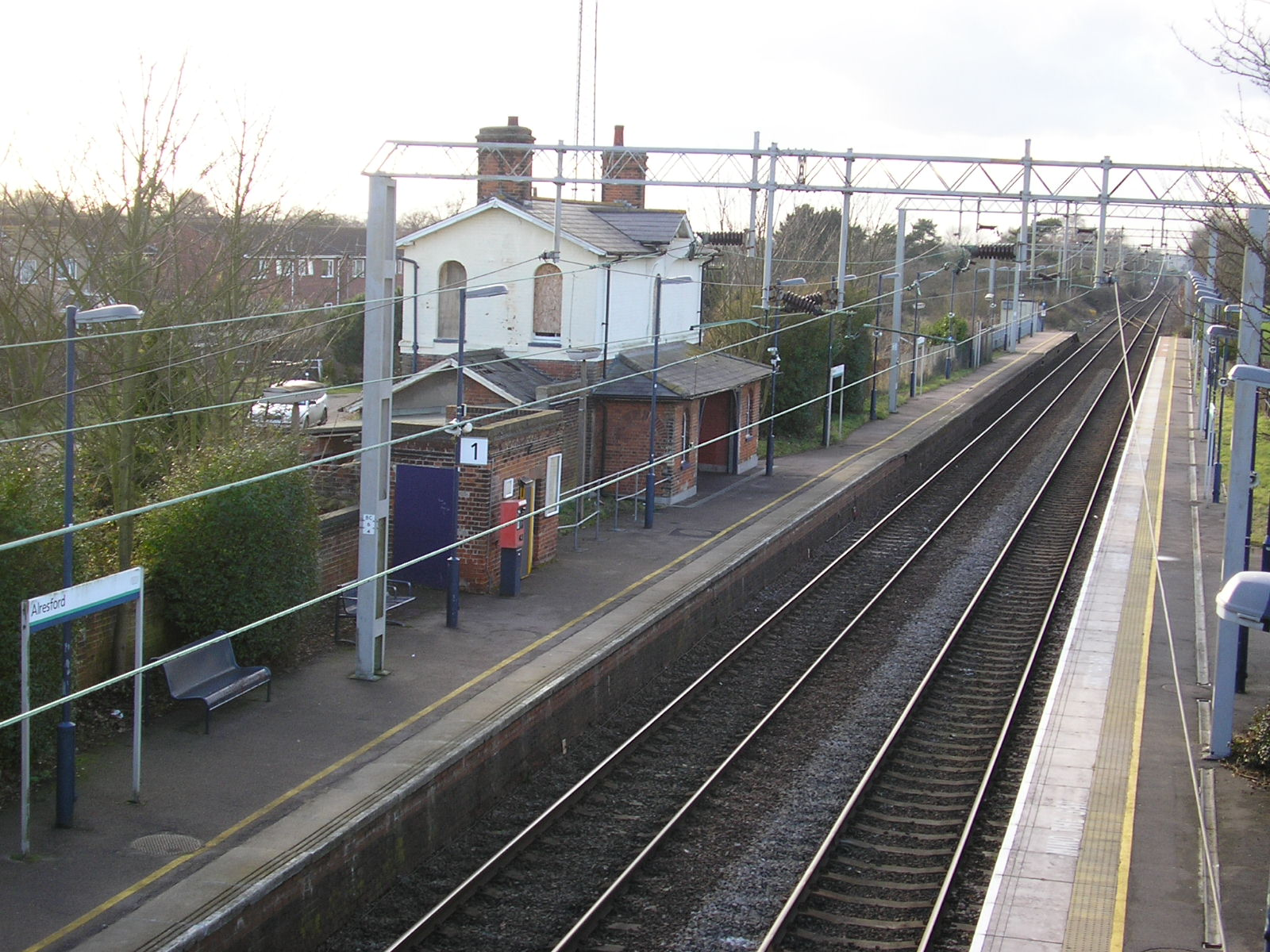
Alresford

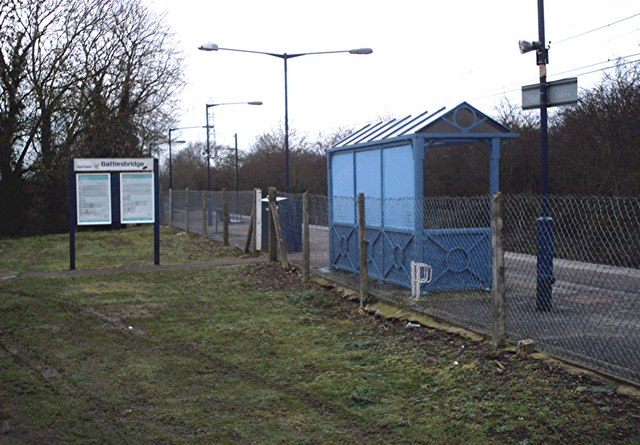
Battlesbridge

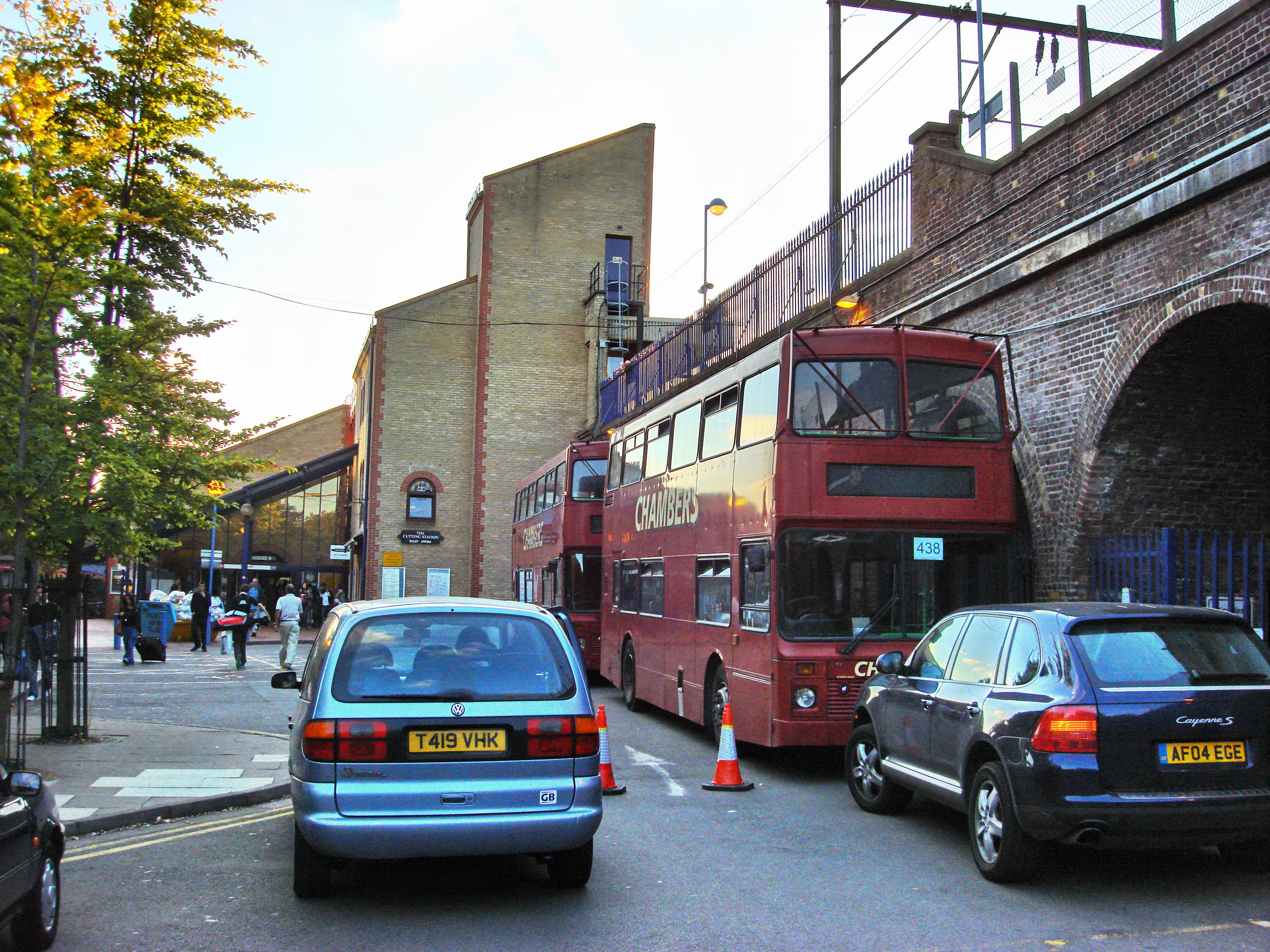
Chelmsford

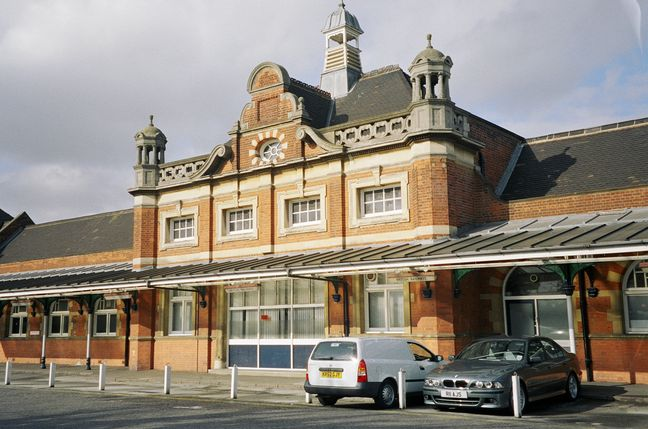
Colchester

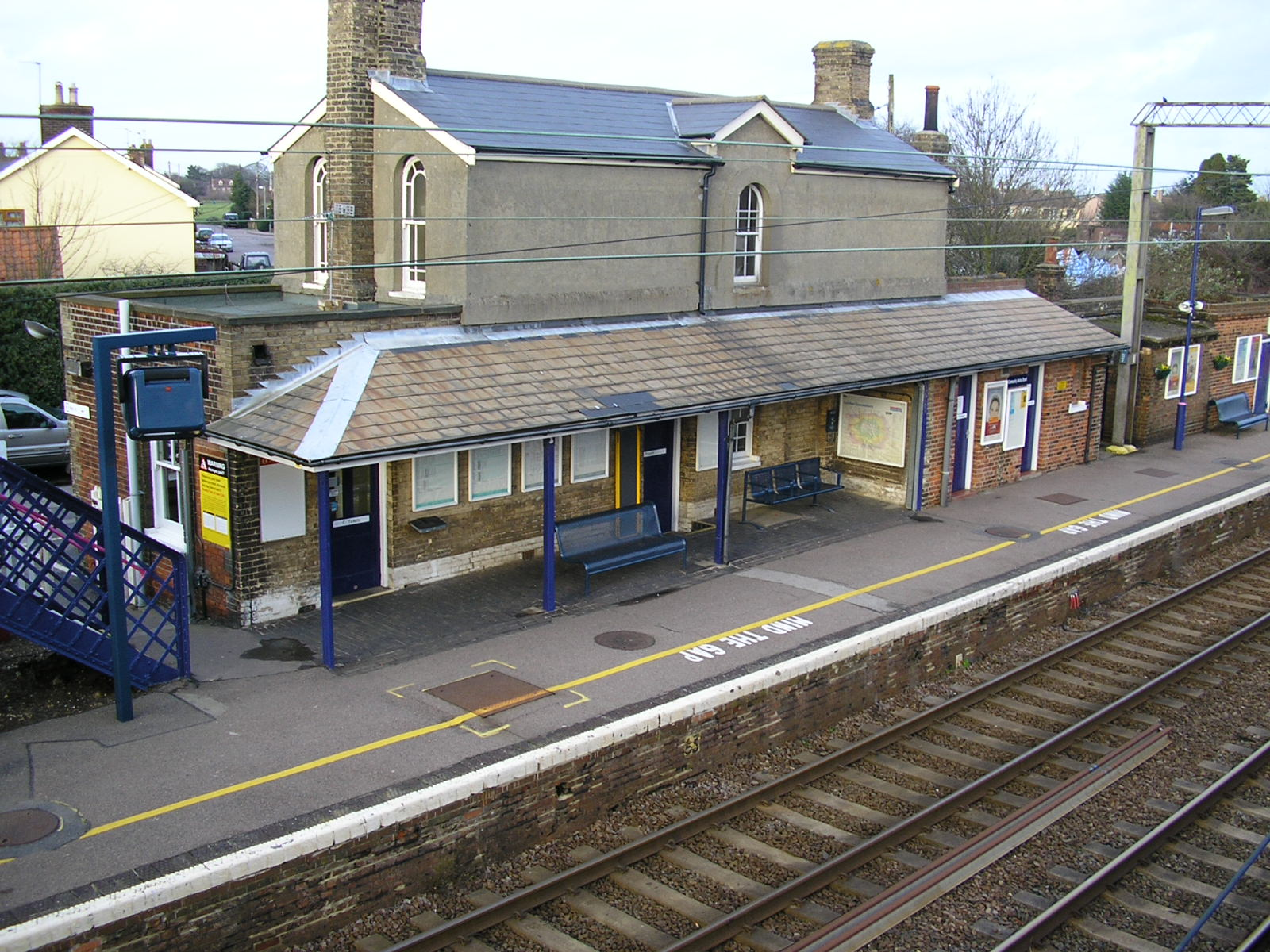
Great Bentley

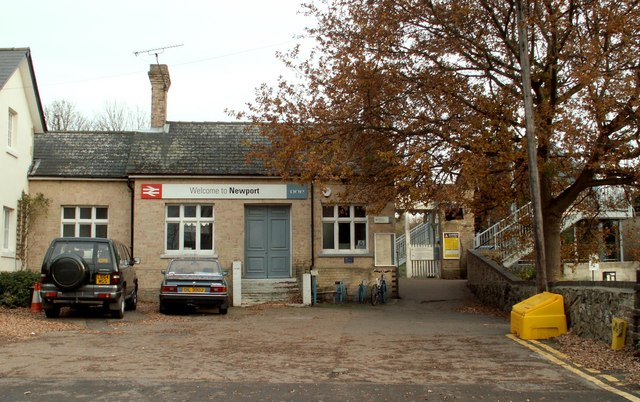
Newport

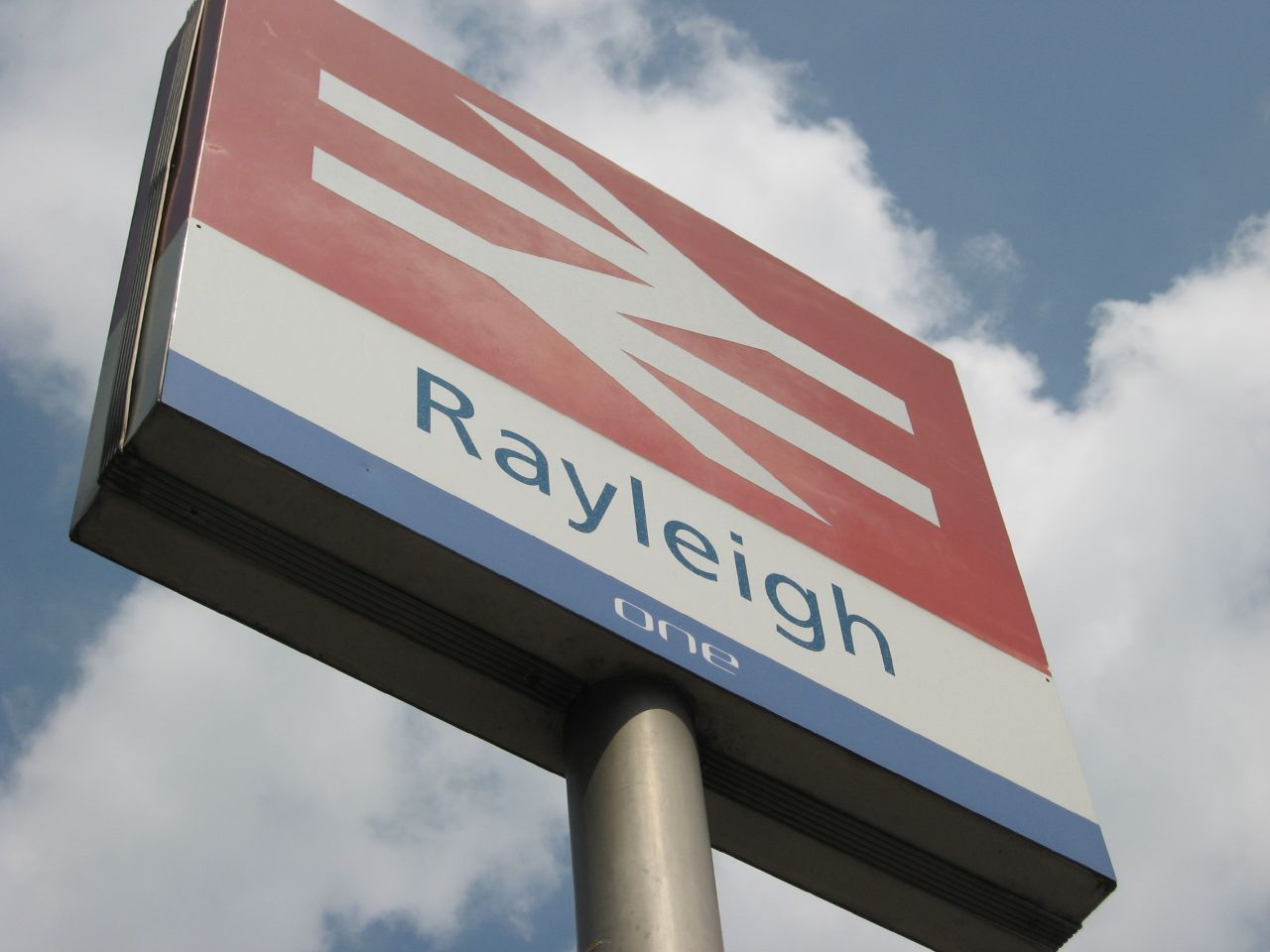
Rayleigh

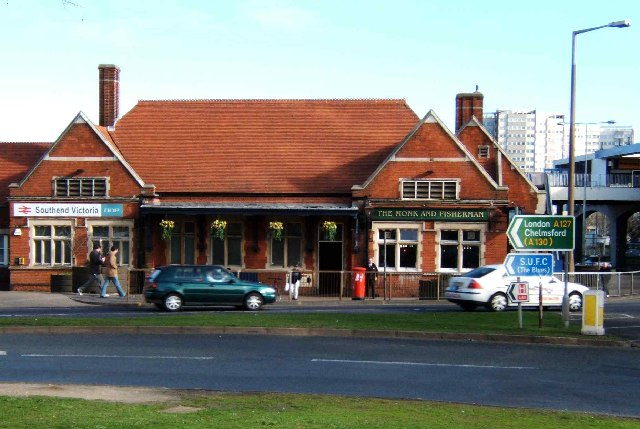
Southend Victoria

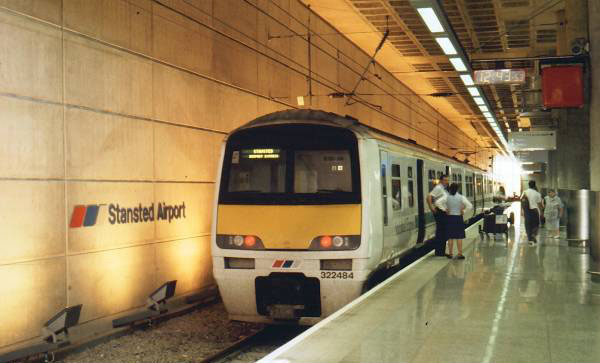
Stansted Airport

Tilbury Town

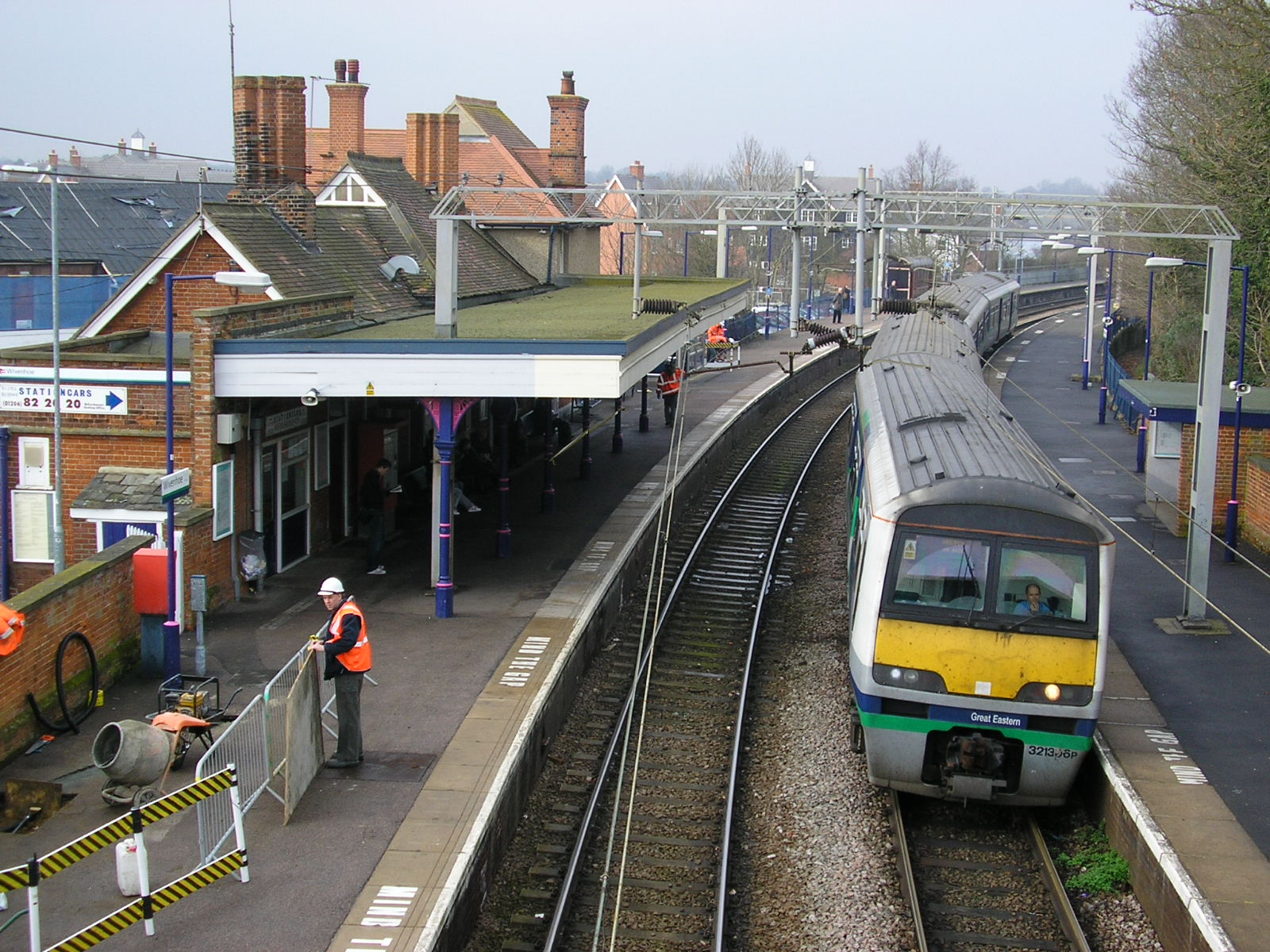
Wivenhoe

This is a list of railway stations in Essex, a county in the East of England. It includes all railway stations that are part of the National Rail network, and which currently have timetabled train services. The Central line of the London Underground and Heritage railway stations within Essex are not listed.

== Rail operators ==
The main operator in the county is Greater Anglia, operated by Abellio and Mitsui. They operate services from Liverpool Street in London to all parts of the county, including commuter services within Essex, and longer distance services to Norwich and Peterborough. Greater Anglia also operate the Stansted Express service from London to Stansted Airport. The other major operators in Essex are c2c, a subsidiary of Trenitalia, who operate services from London's Fenchurch Street to Southend-on-Sea, and the Elizabeth line, operated by MTR Corporation for Transport for London, who operate services from Reading via central London to Shenfield. The Arriva subsidiary CrossCountry operate long-distance services from the West Midlands to Stansted Airport. CrossCountry also serve Audley End.

== Stations ==
The following table lists the name of each station, along with (where known) the year it first opened and the local authority in whose area the station lies. The table also shows the train operators who currently serve each station, and the final two columns give information on the number of passengers using each station in recent years, as collated by the Office of Rail Regulation, a Government body. The figures are based on ticket sales, and are given to the nearest 100.

Station	Year opened	Local authority^{[a]}	Served by	Station users 2004–05	Station users 2005–06
Alresford	1866	Tendring	Greater Anglia	49,400	45,100
Althorne	1889	Maldon	Greater Anglia	43,200	39,600
Audley End	1845	Uttlesford	Greater Anglia; CrossCountry	751,300	721,100
Basildon	1974	Basildon	c2c	2,117,300	2,160,300
Battlesbridge	1889	Chelmsford	Greater Anglia	8,500	7,100
Benfleet	1855	Castle Point	c2c	2,447,600	2,448,900
Billericay	1889	Basildon	Greater Anglia	2,698,500	2,767,000
Braintree	1848^{[b]}	Braintree	Greater Anglia	760,700	779,100
Braintree Freeport	1999	Braintree	Greater Anglia	24,400	22,200
Brentwood	1840	Brentwood	Elizabeth line	2,475,300	2,535,100
Bures	1849	Braintree	Greater Anglia	48,000	48,500
Burnham-on-Crouch	1889	Maldon	Greater Anglia	280,700	263,800
Chafford Hundred	1995	Thurrock	c2c	1,651,400	1,736,400
Chalkwell	1933	Southend-on-Sea	c2c	1,083,500	1,146,000
Chappel & Wakes Colne	1849	Braintree	Greater Anglia	25,500	26,300
Chelmsford	1843	Chelmsford	Greater Anglia	6,698,200	6,801,200
Clacton-on-Sea	1882	Tendring	Greater Anglia	699,300	664,800
Colchester	1843	Colchester	Greater Anglia	4,305,300	4,287,600
Colchester Town	1866	Colchester	Greater Anglia	163,500	161,200
Cressing	1848	Braintree	Greater Anglia	49,300	40,100
Dovercourt	1854	Tendring	Greater Anglia	124,600	128,800
East Tilbury	1936	Thurrock	c2c	299,000	299,800
Elsenham	1845	Uttlesford	Greater Anglia	98,800	84,200
Frinton-on-Sea	1867	Tendring	Greater Anglia	183,600	175,800
Grays	1854	Thurrock	c2c	2,373,700	2,380,900
Great Bentley	1866	Tendring	Greater Anglia	74,200	67,600
Great Chesterford	1845	Uttlesford	Greater Anglia	86,800	86,100
Harlow Mill	1841	Harlow	Greater Anglia	116,000	105,400
Harlow Town	1841	Harlow	Greater Anglia	1,666,800	1,627,200
Harwich International	1883	Tendring	Greater Anglia	91,900	99,500
Harwich Town	1854	Tendring	Greater Anglia	94,400	91,300
Hatfield Peverel	1843	Braintree	Greater Anglia	418,100	412,500
Hythe	1866	Colchester	Greater Anglia	45,200	52,700
Ingatestone	1843	Brentwood	Greater Anglia	606,000	628,200
Kelvedon	1843	Braintree	Greater Anglia	775,000	759,700
Kirby Cross	1866	Tendring	Greater Anglia	45,400	37,500
Laindon	1888	Basildon	c2c	1,455,700	1,458,500
Leigh-on-Sea	1856	Southend-on-Sea	c2c	1,527,100	1,597,300
Manningtree	1846	Tendring	Greater Anglia	719,800	707,800
Marks Tey	1843	Colchester	Greater Anglia	384,300	400,200
Mistley	1854	Tendring	Greater Anglia	31,800	40,000
Newport	1845	Uttlesford	Greater Anglia	228,800	216,000
North Fambridge	1889	Maldon	Greater Anglia	98,800	84,200
Ockendon	1892	Thurrock	c2c	480,800	492,900
Pitsea	1855	Basildon	c2c	870,100	911,600
Prittlewell	1889	Southend-on-Sea	Greater Anglia	109,400	95,300
Purfleet	1854	Thurrock	c2c	273,300	308,600
Rayleigh	1889	Rochford	Greater Anglia	1,903,400	1,649,500
Rochford	1889	Rochford	Greater Anglia	461,400	513,100
Roydon	1844	Epping Forest	Greater Anglia	91,900	90,100
Shenfield	1886	Brentwood	Greater Anglia; Elizabeth line	2,861,300	2,907,900
Shoeburyness	1884	Southend-on-Sea	c2c	506,100	530,700
South Woodham Ferrers	1889	Chelmsford	Greater Anglia	613,500	576,000
Southend Central	1856^{[b]}	Southend-on-Sea	c2c	2,791,100	3,018,100
Southend East	1932	Southend-on-Sea	c2c	769,300	797,500
Southend Victoria	1889	Southend-on-Sea	Greater Anglia	1,369,200	1,719,400
Southminster	1889	Maldon	Greater Anglia	136,100	135,000
Stanford-le-Hope	1854	Thurrock	c2c	816,200	802,900
Stansted Airport	1991	Uttlesford	Greater Anglia; CrossCountry	3,822,100	3,799,500
Stansted Mountfitchet	1845	Uttlesford	Greater Anglia	352,300	358,100
Thorpe Bay	1910	Southend-on-Sea	c2c	702,300	698,100
Thorpe-le-Soken	1866	Tendring	Greater Anglia	135,000	132,800
Tilbury Town	1885	Thurrock	c2c	663,800	712,200
Walton-on-the-Naze	1867	Tendring	Greater Anglia	112,300	105,200
Weeley	1866	Tendring	Greater Anglia	18,000	14,600
West Horndon	1886	Brentwood	c2c	317,100	337,600
Westcliff	1895	Southend-on-Sea	c2c	872,600	913,400
White Notley	1848	Braintree	Greater Anglia	16,400	19,600
Wickford	1889	Basildon	Greater Anglia	2,013,900	1,940,300
Witham	1843	Braintree	Greater Anglia	2,261,200	2,307,300
Wivenhoe	1863	Colchester	Greater Anglia	318,500	321,000
Wrabness	1854	Tendring	Greater Anglia	18,500	21,200

== See also ==
- List of London Underground stations
- Closed London Underground stations
- List of railway stations in Kent

== Footnotes ==
^{a}

Numbered map of the districts and unitary authorities of Essex.: 1. Uttlesford; 2. Braintree; 3. Colchester; 4. Tendring; 5. Harlow; 6. Epping Forest; 7. Chelmsford; 8. Maldon; 9. Brentwood; 10. Basildon; 11. Rochford; 12. Castle Point

^{b} Braintree moved in 1869 to accommodate through running of trains to Bishops Stortford. The site of the original station became a goods yard.
^{c} Southend Central was rebuilt in 1889, and enlarged in 1899.
