= CHW =

CHW may refer to:

== Health and wellness ==
- Community health worker, members of local communities that provide basic health and medical care
- Catholic Healthcare West, former name of a California-based corporation that operates hospitals and ancillary care facilities
- Children's Hospital of Wisconsin, a children's hospital in Milwaukee

== Information technology ==
- Microsoft Compiled HTML Help file extension
- ChileHardware, a Spanish language computer hardware review site

== Transportation ==
- Chestnut Hill West Line, Philadelphia; SEPTA abbreviation CHW
- Chai Wan station, Hong Kong; MTR station code CHW
- Chalkwell railway station, Essex, England; National Rail station code CHW

== Other uses ==
- Chicago White Sox, a Major League Baseball team that uses this abbreviation for box scores and television scoring displays
- Cherry Hill High School West, a public high school in New Jersey, USA
- CHW as ISO code for WIR Bank currency
