= Westcliff railway station =

Railway station in Essex, England

Coordinates: 51.537°N 0.691°E

Westcliff
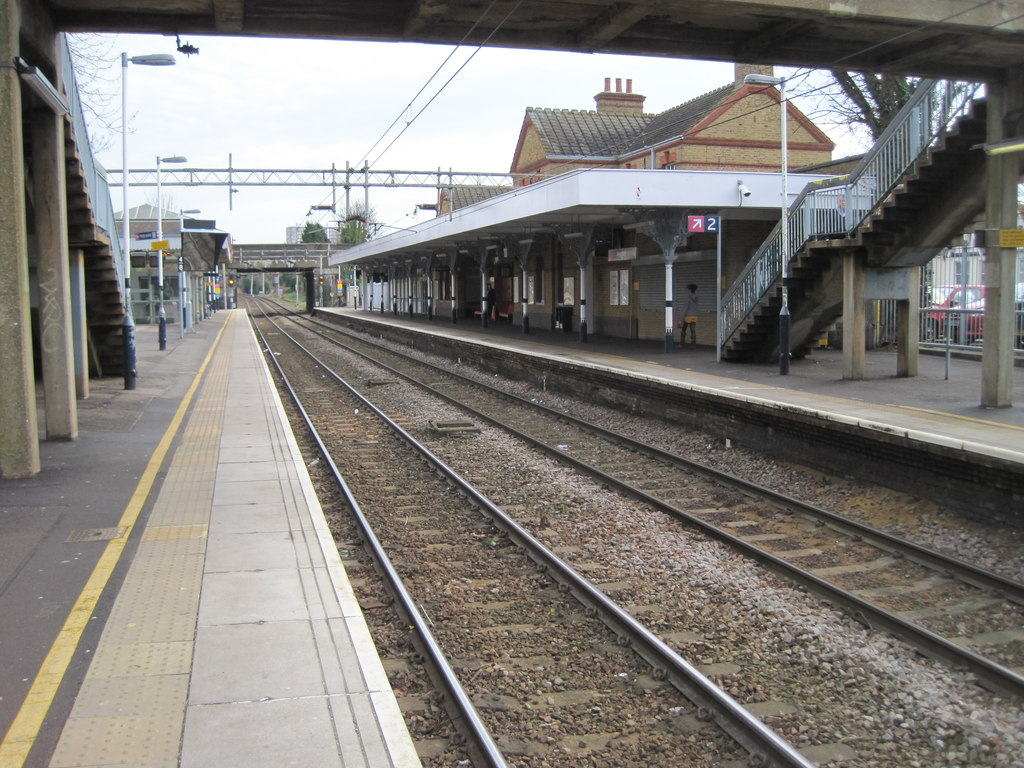

General information
- Location: Westcliff-on-Sea, Southend-on-Sea; England
- Grid reference: TQ867854
- Manager: c2c
- Platforms: 2

Other information
- Station code: WCF
- Classification: DfT category F1

History
- Original company: London, Tilbury and Southend Railway
- Pre-grouping: Midland Railway
- Post-grouping: London, Midland and Scottish Railway

Key dates
- 1 July 1895: Opened as Westcliff-on-Sea
- 20 February 1969: Renamed Westcliff

Passengers
- 2020/21: ▼0.408 million
- 2021/22: ▲0.802 million
- 2022/23: ▲0.921 million
- 2023/24: ▲0.957 million
- 2024/25: ▲1.056 million
Location
Notes
- Passenger statistics from the Office of Rail and Road

Westcliff railway station is on the London, Tilbury and Southend line, serving the locality of Westcliff-on-Sea in Southend-on-Sea, Essex. It is 34 miles 66 chains (56.0 km) down the main line from London Fenchurch Street via Basildon and it is situated between Chalkwell to the west and Southend Central to the east. Its three-letter station code is WCF. The station and all trains serving it are currently operated by c2c.

== History ==
=== London Tilbury & Southend Railway (1895–1912) ===
The railway through Westcliff (or Melton as it was then known) was opened by the London Tilbury & Southend Railway (LT&SR) when they extended their main line from Leigh-on-Sea to Southend in 1856.

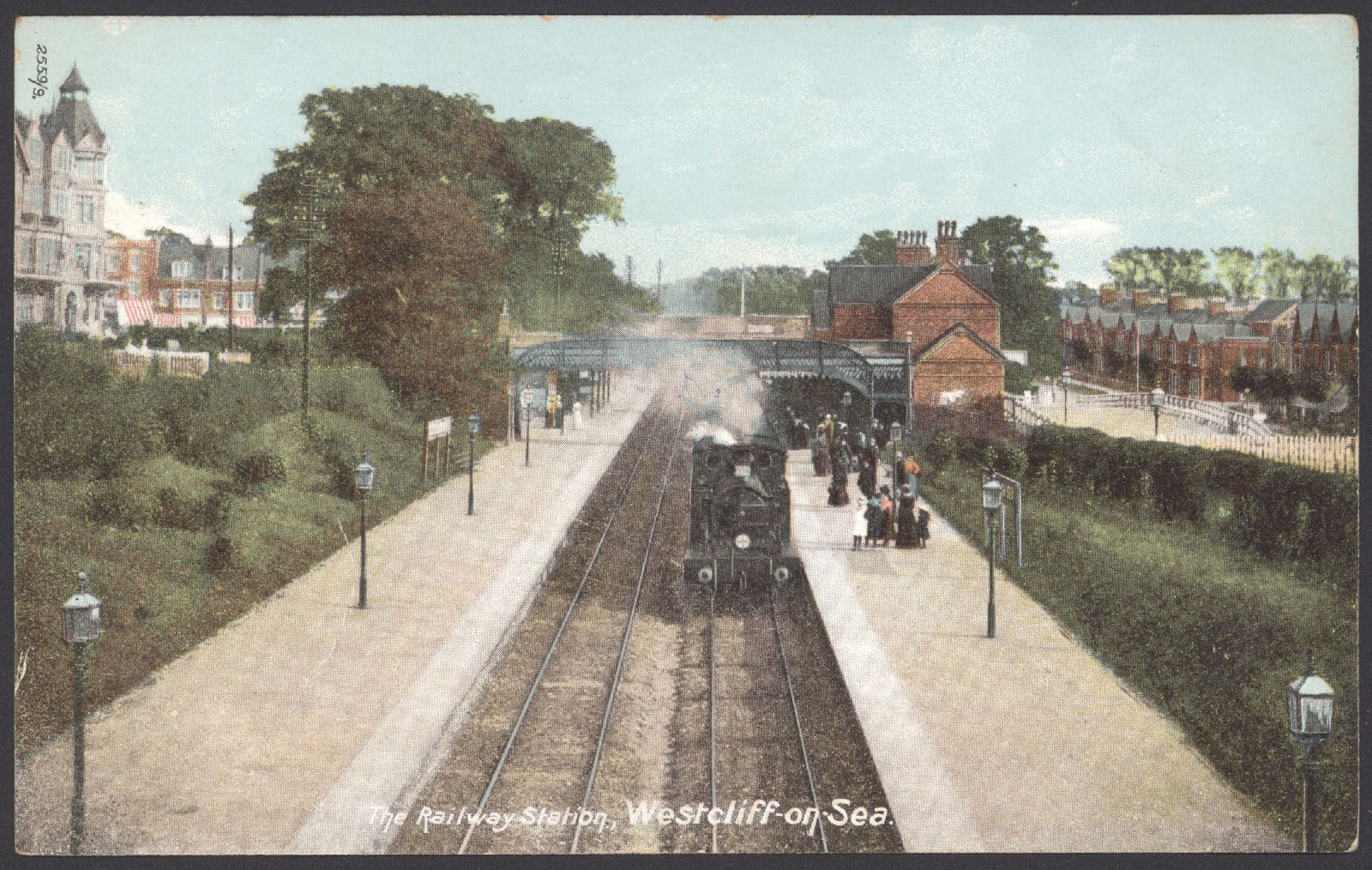
Westcliff-on-Sea railway station, Essex, England about 1895.

Thomas Brassey, one of the original contractors that built the line, had bought up much land around Southend anticipating its growth in the late 19th Century. His son Lord Brassey had his agents begin planning the Hamlet Estate located west of central Southend. Brassey approached the LT&SR about providing a station in early 1891 but it was not until 1893 that an agreement was reached and the contract for construction let. The name Westcliffe-on-Sea was chosen noting that adjacent station Leigh was renamed Leigh-on-Sea in the same year. The first trains served the new station on 1 July 1897.

The station is largely intact today and had two platforms linked by a footbridge. The main station building is on the up (towards London) side and a shelter was provided on the down side. There were no goods facilities provided although a signal box located at the west end of the down platform was provided to break up the long section between Leigh and Southend.

A new parcel office was provided in 1904 located on the eastern end of the up platform.

During 1910 short lived siding on the down side was provided east of the station. It was never formally commissioned and removed almost immediately.

=== Midland Railway (1912–1923) ===
In 1912 the Midland Railway bought the LT&SR on 7 August 1912 so Westcliffe-On-Sea became a Midland Railway station.

=== London Midland & Scottish Railway (1923–1948) ===
Following the Railways Act 1921 the station became the responsibility of the London Midland and Scottish (LMS) Railway from 1 January 1923.

Just after World War II started in September 1939, the passenger service was reduced as a wartime economy measure.

=== British Railways (1948–1994) ===
Following nationalisation of Britain's railways in 1948, the station transferred under British Railways to the London Midland Region. On 20 February 1949, the whole LTS line was transferred to the Eastern Region, yet despite the organisational changes, the old LTSR still was a distinctive system operated by former LTS and LMS steam locomotives until electrification.

During the late 1950s the LTS was being electrified and re-signalled and at Westcliff the platforms lengthened and on 6 November 1961 the signal box was abolished. A full electric timetable started operating in June 1962 which was primarily worked by Class 302 EMUs. The canopy over the up side entrance was removed in 1964 and a modern ticket and parcels office was provided in 1965 replacing the 1904 structure.

The station was renamed Westcliff on 20 February 1969 although some of the station signage had been altered earlier with the "on sea" being in smaller writing or left out altogether.

During 1986/7 the original down platform shelter was replaced by a new building and canopy (but incorporated the original iron columns that supported the roof).

The LTS line and Westcliffe station became part of the London and South Eastern sector of British Rail in 1982, and in June 1986 this was rebranded as Network South East (NSE). With the Conservative government of the early 1990s looking to privatise the railways, the operation of the NSE passenger train service was put under the control of a Train Operating Unit.

In 1990 the 1960s entrance building was badly damaged by fire and replaced in 1993.

=== The Privatisation Era (1994–2025) ===
On privatisation in 1994, infrastructure ownership passed to Railtrack and Prism Rail took over operations of the franchise, marketing the route as LTS Rail. Prism Rail were bought out by National Express in 2000 and in 2002 the line was rebranded as c2c.

Ownership of the infrastructure passed to Network Rail in 2002.

National Express sold the operation of the franchise to Trenitalia in 2017.

The station and all trains serving it are currently operated by c2c and are operated by Class 357 and Class 720/6 EMUs.

A more detailed history of the franchises can be found on the c2c page.

Private operation of the London, Tilbury and Southend line by Trenitalia c2c ceased on 20 July 2025, with the new publicly owned operator c2c taking over.

== Design ==
The main ticket office is located on the London-bound side of the station, leading to platform 1. It has two serving positions and uses the Tribute ticket issuing system. Outside the main ticket office is a self-service ticket machine. A second, smaller ticket office is on the country-bound platform 2, but is not currently in use.

Facilities at the station include a bicycle rack, a taxicab stand, and a car park with 50 spaces and three disabled spaces. It was extensively improved between 2004 and 2006 in a £500,000 refurbishment project by a partnership between c2c and Southend Borough Council in order to attract more people to travel by rail.

== Services ==
=== December 1895 ===
Westcliffe-on-Sea always enjoyed a good passenger service to London Fenchurch Street even in the first couple of years after opening when the area was still being developed. Passenger numbers soon increased and it became quite a busy station with commuter traffic and, because of its proximity to the sea a destination for day trippers.

In the Bradshaw's Railway Guide for the December 1895 timetable (tables 210–215) the up morning peak had trains for Fenchurch Street at 6.40 (all stations via Tilbury) 7.45 (fast service via Laindon arrive 08.51), 8.07 (via Laindon) to arriving 9.17 and an 8.47 to St Pancras via the Tottenham and Hampstead Junction Railway. In the down direction there were services towards Shoeburyness at 7.46, 8.53 and then a two-hour gap to 10.52 after which Westcliff had one train per hour rom Fenchurch Street and occasional services from St Pancras.

The down evening peak there were services from Fenchurch Street to Westcliff at 4.25pm, 5.15 express (which arrived at Westcliff at 6.02), 5.53, 6.08 and 6.30. Additionally there were two all stations services via Tilbury and on 05.23 from St Pancras. In the up direction there was an hourly service one of which went to St Pancras.

Sunday services consisted of 8 services towards Southend and seven up services. During the Spring and Summer these would have been supplemented by additional services.

District Line services served the line from July 1910 to the outbreak of World War II in September 1939. More information of these can be found in the London, Tilbury and Southend Line page.

=== Present Day ===
As of the June 2024 timetable the typical Monday to Friday off-peak service is:

- 4 tph (trains per hour) westbound to London Fenchurch Street via Basildon (2 tph all stations and 2 tph semi-fast)
- 2 tph westbound to London Fenchurch Street via Tilbury Town and Ockendon
- 6 tph eastbound to Southend Central, of which 4 tph continue to Shoeburyness

Preceding station	National Rail	Following station
Chalkwell	c2c London, Tilbury and Southend line	Southend Central
