= Benfleet railway station =

Railway station in Essex, England

Coordinates: 51.544°N 0.562°E

Benfleet
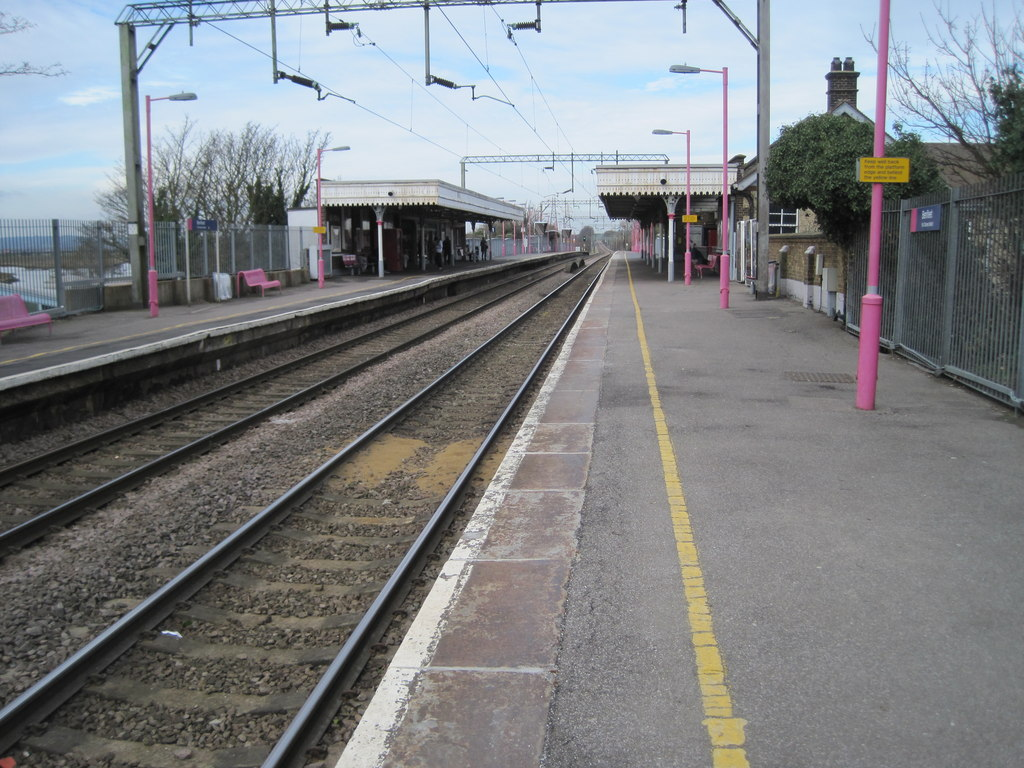

General information
- Location: South Benfleet, Castle Point; England
- Grid reference: TQ777859
- Manager: c2c
- Platforms: 2

Other information
- Station code: BEF
- Classification: DfT category C2

History
- Opened: 1855

Passengers
- 2020/21: ▼0.927 million
- 2021/22: ▲2.060 million
- 2022/23: ▲2.398 million
- 2023/24: ▼2.358 million
- 2024/25: ▲2.439 million
Location
Notes
- Passenger statistics from the Office of Rail and Road

Benfleet is a railway station on the London, Tilbury and Southend line, serving the towns of South Benfleet and Canvey Island, Essex. It is 29 miles 11 chains (46.9 km) down the main line from London Fenchurch Street via Basildon and it is situated between Pitsea to the west and Leigh-on-Sea to the east. Its three-letter station code is BEF. The station and all trains serving it are currently operated by c2c.

The station is located between Ferry Road and Station Road with the main building located on the Station Road side although there is an entrance on the Ferry Road side for Canvey Island passengers.

== Design ==
The original station was situated west of the current station on the other side of Ferry Road (which has since been diverted via the east end of the station). The initial station had two timber platforms and a timber station building located on the up (towards London) side of the line.

The current station was built west of the crossing and the main building houses the ticket office which has four serving positions. The station also has three self-service ticket machines that accept cash or card payment. Entry to the platforms is via four automatic ticket gates. On the Station Road side of the building there is a secondary entrance which is open during the weekday peak periods; this has three barriers and the fourth self-service ticket machine. The two platforms are reached by fixed staircases. Step-free access is provided to and from both platforms by the use of automatic gates located at the country-end of the platforms. In 2007 the ticket office was refurbished, and a new front ticket office counter was built. It has one lower ticket office window for wheelchair users.

There are two platforms - one for trains towards Fenchurch Street and the other for trains towards Southend and Shoeburyness.

== History ==
=== Early Years (1855-1912) ===
The LT&SR opened their first line to Tilbury and then continued working east towards Southend opening the line up in stages to Stanford-le-Hope in May 1855 and to Benfleet later that year. The station opened on 1 March 1856 as a temporary terminus while the line to Southend was built with this opening later in 1856.

With the population in the Southend area starting to grow the LT&SR recognised they needed a more direct route and they opened a line between Barking and Pitsea which offered faster services to Fenchurch Street on 1 June 1888, Two months later a storm on 1 August 1888 caused a temporary closure of the new line until 1 October. The following day flooding on the Tilbury line saw the service suspended for six days meaning Southend had no rail service at all.

Around the beginning of the century a monorail system was planned on Canvey Island. This linked the Canvey Island seafront with the winter gardens with a branch to Benfleet Quay for interchange with the main line. The main line was built but only operating for one season (1902) and there were plans to convert it to an 3 feet 6 inch electric tramway that saw some electric poles erected an four electric trams delivered to the island.

The original 1855 station building burned down in a fire on 11 November 1901 and there were local hopes for a new station as the original station was already looking down at heel. The LT&SR however had other ideas, and erected a crude replacement timber building on the same site and moved the waiting shelter from the down side to the up side and converted it into a ticket office.

In 1909 a new station was authorised to be built of the west side of the level crossing. The opportunity was taken to re-align the track first and the work on the new station started in 1910 and opened on 10 December 1911 to fulsome praise from the Southend Telegraph - "The station house are of stock brick with blue facings, and the whole finished in rough casting of the Elizabethan period which has been spoken warmly of for its picturesqueness".

The old station was demolished with a refuge siding being provided on the up side and an expanded goods yard on the down side.

=== Midland Railway (1912-1922) ===
In 1912 the Midland Railway bought the LT&SR on 7 August 1912 so Benfleet became a Midland Railway station.

On 12 February 1914 a retired Royal Navy officer was hit by a train in the vicinity of the Dock occupation crossing.

=== London Midland & Scottish (1923-1947) ===
Following the Railways Act 1921 the station became the responsibility of the London Midland and Scottish (LMS) Railway from 1 January 1923.

Just after World War II started in September 1939, the passenger service was reduced as a wartime economy measure.

=== The nationalisation years (1948-1994) ===
Following nationalisation of Britain's railways in 1948, the station transferred under British Railways to the London Midland Region. On 20 February 1949, the whole LTS line was transferred to the Eastern Region, yet despite the organisational changes, the old LTSR still was a distinctive system operated by former LTS and LMS steam locomotives until electrification.

The catastrophic North Sea flood of 1953 flooded parts of the LTS line on 1 February 1953 including the line between Benfleet and Leigh-on-Sea. Main line services terminated at Benfleet during this period. Full main line services resumed on 19 February.

During the late 1950s the LTS was being electrified and re-signalled and a number of changes were made at Benfleet in 1956/7 including extending all platforms for 12-car operation.

A full electric timetable started operating in June 1962 which was primarily worked by Class 302 EMUs.

In February 1962 the council had built a road to the west that utilised two arches of the creek bridge and removed the need for a level crossing at the east end of the station. The crossing was however retained for emergency use until 24 April 1977. A new station entrance was built on the up side for Canvey Island passengers and a subway between the platforms provided.

The LTS line and Benfleet station became part of the London and South Eastern sector of British Rail in 1982, and in June 1986 this was rebranded as Network South East (NSE). With the Conservative government of the early 1990s looking to privatise the railways, the operation of the NSE passenger train service was put under the control of a Train Operating Unit.

The station roof and canopy were destroyed during the Great storm of 1987.

=== The privatisation era (1994-2025) ===
On privatisation in 1994, infrastructure ownership passed to Railtrack and Prism Rail took over operations of the franchise, marketing the route as LTS Rail. Prism Rail were bought out by National Express in 2000 and in 2002 the line was rebranded as c2c.

Ownership of the infrastructure passed to Network Rail in 2002.

National Express sold the operation of the franchise to Trenitalia in 2017.

The station and all trains serving it are currently operated by c2c and are operated by Class 357 and Class 720/6 EMUs.

A more detailed history of the franchises can be found on the c2c page.

Private operation of the London, Tilbury and Southend line by Trenitalia c2c ceased on 20 July 2025, with the new publicly owned operator c2c taking over.

== Operations ==
=== Services ===
In the November 1856 timetable the station was served by four trains per day operating from Fenchurch to Tilbury Riverside, where the train reversed, and then onto Benfleet and terminating at Southend. Similarly four trains operated in the other direction.

In the December 1895 timetable. consisted of nine down and nine up services on Mondays to Fridays with two additional on Saturdays only. There were three each way on Sundays. The majority of services ran via Upminster and passengers had to change at Pitsea for the line to Tilbury.

Daily services also ran to Benfleet from St Pancras, Broad Street and from Ealing Broadway via the District Line. More information on these is on the London, Tilbury and Southend line page.

In July 1923 timetable reflected the change in the working week to half day on Saturday with more trains in the early afternoon. The service had improved at Benfleet reflecting the fact that the commuter market was growing at this time.

The standard off-peak service to Benfleet via Tilbury in June 1962 - the first all electric service - was four trains in each direction on both the main and Tilbury lines.

As of the June 2024 timetable the typical Monday to Friday off-peak service was:

- 2 tph (trains per hour) westbound to London Fenchurch Street via Basildon
- 2 tph westbound to London Fenchurch Street via Tilbury Town and Ockendon
- 2 tph eastbound to Shoeburyness
- 2 tph eastbound to Southend Central

=== Goods ===
The original station had a single siding behind the down platform.

When the first station closed it was demolished and became the site of a new expanded goods yard with two sidings and a cattle dock.

In the September 1962 timetable the goods yard was served by weekday 1.25.a.m. Ripple Lane to Shoeburyness goods train in the September 1962 freight working timetable.

The goods yard closed on 5 June 1967.

=== Signalling ===
Prior to signalling being introduced trains were kept apart by a time interval system. After a train had departed the next train would not be allowed to depart for an agreed period of time.

The first signal box was provided in 1881 and was located by the level crossing on the up side. This was replaced by a temporary box in 1910 while a new signal box was built on the site of the 1881 structure.

The new signal box opened in 1911 when the station was rebuilt and this continued in use until 4 December 1960 when it was downgraded to control the level crossing only. Despite a new more convenient road being built which rendered the crossing redundant except in emergencies. This lasted until 1977 being demolished soon afterwards.

In 2025 the signalling is controlled by the Upminster signalling centre.

| Preceding station | National Rail | Following station |
|---|---|---|
| Pitsea | c2c London, Tilbury and Southend line | Leigh-on-Sea |
