= Leigh-on-Sea railway station =

Railway station in Essex, England

Coordinates: 51.541°N 0.640°E

Leigh-on-Sea
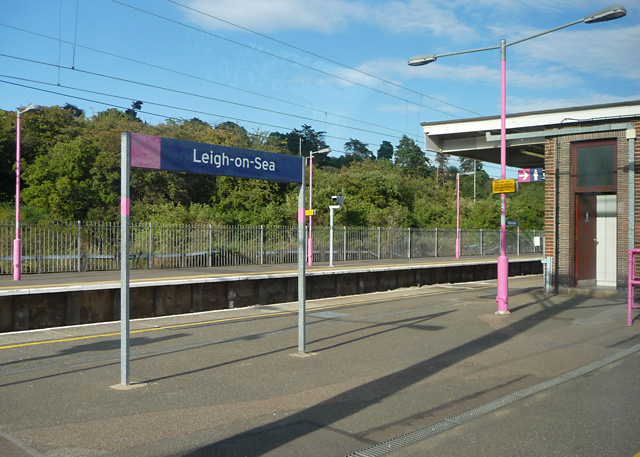

General information
- Location: Leigh-on-Sea, Southend-on-Sea; England
- Grid reference: TQ831857
- Manager: c2c
- Platforms: 3

Other information
- Station code: LES
- Classification: DfT category C2

Key dates
- 1 July 1855: Opened as Leigh
- 1 October 1904: Renamed Leigh-on-Sea
- 1 January 1934: Re-sited

Passengers
- 2020/21: ▼0.480 million
- 2021/22: ▲1.248 million
- 2022/23: ▲1.563 million
- 2023/24: ▲1.635 million
- 2024/25: ▲1.690 million
Location
Notes
- Passenger statistics from the Office of Rail and Road

Leigh-on-Sea railway station is on the London, Tilbury and Southend line, serving the town of Leigh-on-Sea, Essex. It is 32 miles 43 chains (52.4 km) down the main line from London Fenchurch Street via Basildon and it is situated between Benfleet to the west and Chalkwell to the east. Its three-letter station code is LES.

It was originally opened as Leigh by the London, Tilbury and Southend Railway on 1 July 1855, being renamed Leigh-on-Sea on 1 October 1904, but was rebuilt by the London, Midland and Scottish Railway on a new site, 880 yards (805 m) to the west, opening on 1 January 1934. The station and all trains serving it are currently operated by c2c.

== History ==
=== London, Tilbury and Southend Railway (1855-1912) ===
When the London, Tilbury and Southend Railway were planning their railway the London, Tilbury and Southend Extension Railway Act 1852 was to build the railway slightly north of the fishing port of Leigh. On 25 October 1853 a survey by George Parker Bidder and John Fowler presented their concerns to the joint management committee that this route would mean building a steep-sided cutting in the clay hillside. They had surveyed a new route closer to the sea that ran along the backs of properties on the High Street significantly reducing their back gardens. The change was approved by the London, Tilbury and Southend Railway Deviation and Amendment Act 1854.

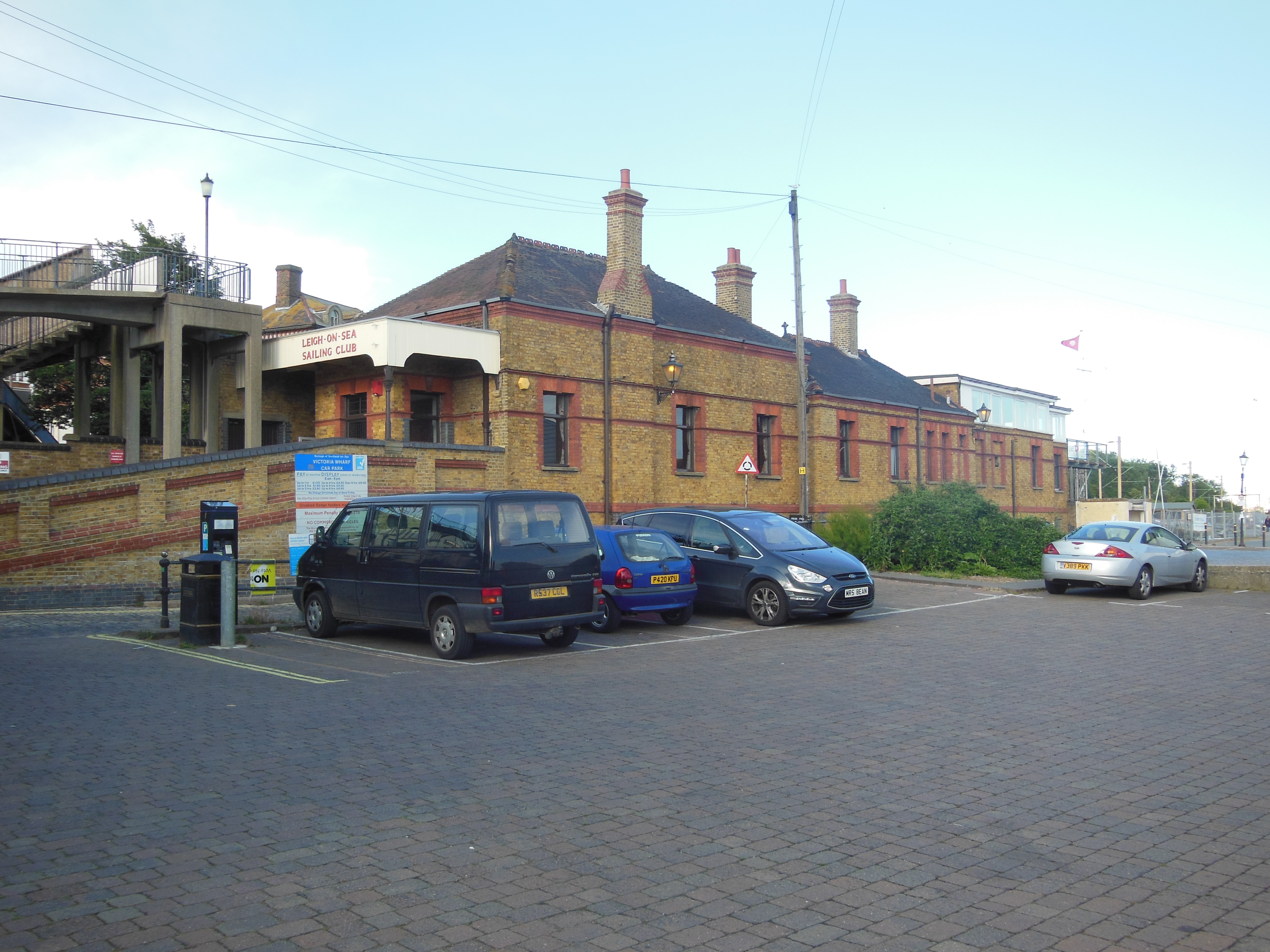
1855 railway station, Leigh-on-Sea

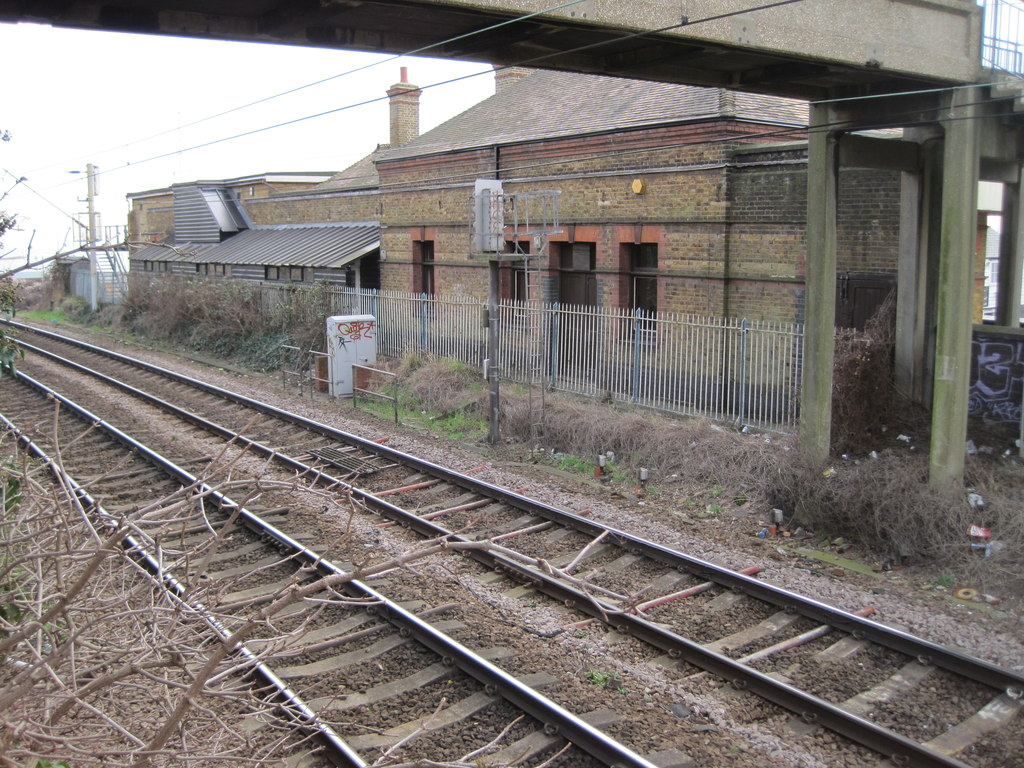
Leigh-on-Sea 1855 railway station view from the rail side

The line to Leigh (as it was then called) opened on 1 June 1855 and it acted as a terminus until 1 March 1856 when through services to Southend commenced.

The original station was built in Leigh Old Town and split the market place in two. It had two platforms and the station building was on the up side of the tracks with a smaller shelter on the down side. There were a number of level crossings (mostly footpath) that resulted from the new alignment and the LT&SR tried to close to much local opposition. Generally as time passed these were replaced by footbridges. There was a level crossing at the west end of the station which allowed vehicular access to the port area and Leigh High Street.

In 1897 the down platform (towards Shoeburyness) was rebuilt on the west side of the level crossing to enable the up platform to be widened out. The town and station were renamed Leigh-On-Sea the same year.

The Whitechapel and Bow Railway, opened in 1902, permitted through trains to operate from the District Railway on to the LTSR. This was initially used for inner suburban District Railway trains that did not go beyond Upminster. In 1909 and 1910 trial joint through services were run from Ealing Broadway to Southend, changing from electric District to steam LTSR locomotives en route. This became a regular timetable in 1911. The service ended on 11 September 1939.

=== Midland Railway (1912-1923) ===
In 1912 the Midland Railway bought the LT&SR on 7 August 1912 so Leigh-On-Sea became a Midland Railway station.

=== London Midland and Scottish Railway (1923-1948) ===
Following the Railways Act 1921 the station became the responsibility of the London Midland and Scottish (LMS) Railway from 1 January 1923.

As early as 1924 there was talk of improving the station at Leigh but the LMS and Southend Corporation decided that two new stations required and the 1896 station and goods yard would close. The new Leigh-On-Sea station was to be situated 0.75 miles to the west and a new station at Chalkwell to the east would be provided. It was not until 1929 that a scheme was developed and this was all agreed in January 1930. The new Chalkwell station would serve passengers in eastern Leigh-On-Sea who otherwise would be inconvenienced. The London, Midland and Scottish Railway (No. 1) Act 1930 meant land acquisition could commence and in 1932 the LMS presented a revised (and slightly cheaper) plan. Work started in June 1932.

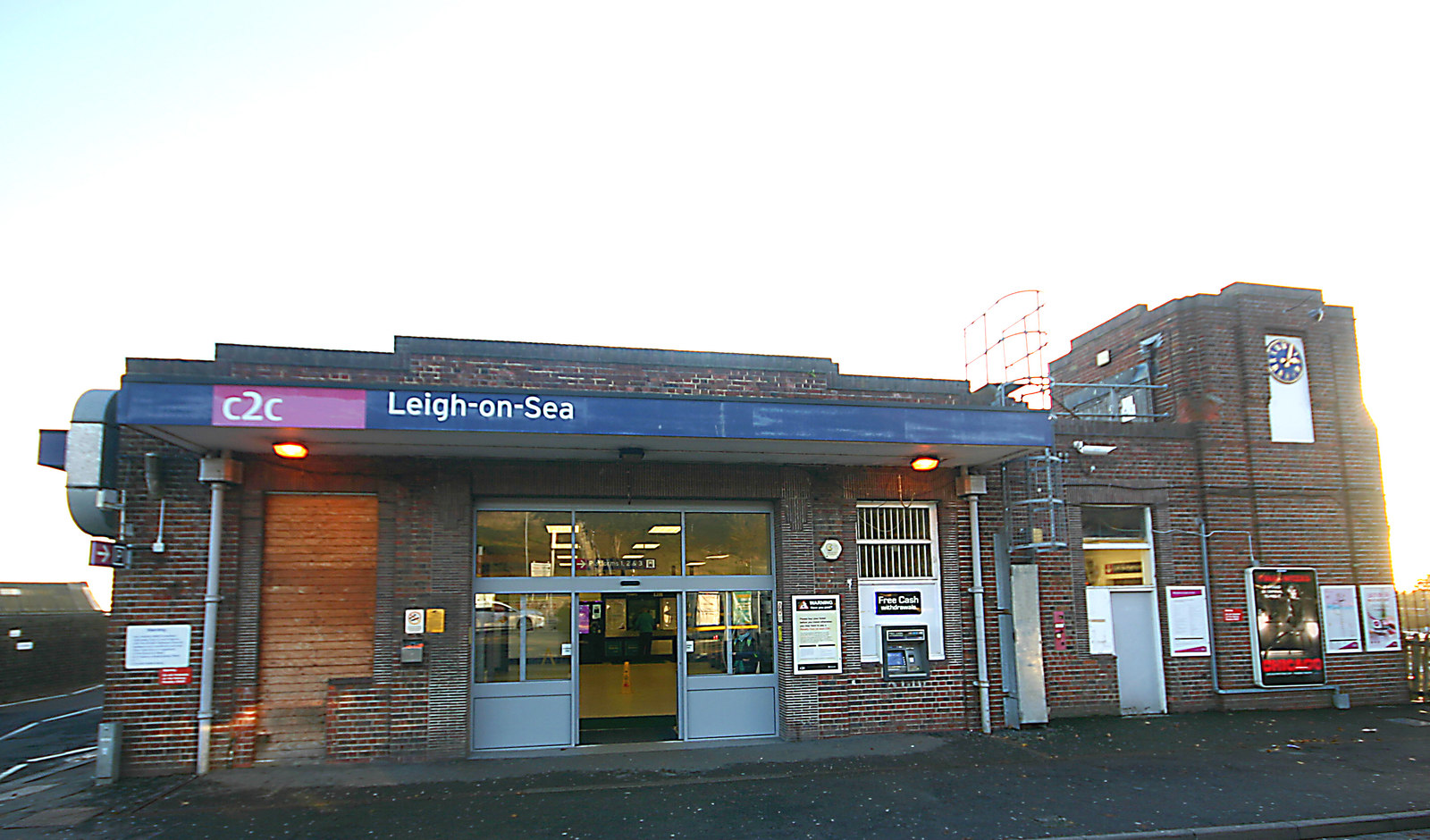
Leigh-on-Sea 1934 station, front entrance in 2018

The new station had two 700 foot platforms but space was allowed to bring this up to four. The station building was on a bridge which went to the goods yard located on the up side of the line. The entrance to the platforms was on the down side and they could be reached by stairs or lifts. There was a turning circle for connecting bus services and the waiting rooms had central heating. Worthy of note is the up platform had a cockle shed at the west end where shellfish for conveyance by passenger train could be left.

The new station opened to traffic on 1 January 1934 with an official ceremony three days later. A special train was run from St Pancras and included the LMS Chairman and several LMS officers. Speeches were made by the mayor of Southend before all boarded the train for a celebratory lunch in Southend.

The 1896 down side building was then used by the 3rd Chalkwell Sea Scout troop until the northern platform buildings were demolished to allow the widening of the adjacent road. The other platform and station building still exist and are currently (in 2025) used by Leigh Sailing Club.

There was a fatal accident in the goods yard on 15 December 1935 with one fatality and three injured.

Just after World War II started in September 1939, the passenger service was reduced as a wartime economy measure.

=== British Railways (1948-1994) ===
Following nationalisation of Britain's railways in 1948, the station transferred under British Railways to the London Midland Region. On 20 February 1949, the whole LTS line was transferred to the Eastern Region, yet despite the organisational changes, the old LTSR still was a distinctive system operated by former LTS and LMS steam locomotives until electrification.

The North Sea flood of 1953 hit the station hard with flood water reaching above platform level and rendering the line unusable between 1 February and 19 February.

During the late 1950s the LTS was being electrified and re-signalled and a number of changes were made at Leigh-on-Sea including the opening of a third platform which was used by up services. The old up platform (now Platform 2) after that was primarily used for turning trains short or when there is engineering work. The station was completely re-signalled using mechanical semaphore signalling. This was in use for a mere five years before colour light signalling was introduced. A new cockle shed was also provided in this scheme.

As part of the 1950s work the sharp curve through the old station site was re-aligned after the unused up platform on in late December 1953. the Up Refuge (just east of the station) was also lifted as part of this work. The station building and platform on the down side survived a further three years before being demolished.

A full electric timetable started operating in June 1962 which was primarily worked by Class 302 EMUs.

The LTS line and Leigh-On-Sea station became part of the London and South Eastern sector of British Rail in 1982, and in June 1986 this was rebranded as Network South East (NSE). With the Conservative government of the early 1990s looking to privatise the railways, the operation of the NSE passenger train service was put under the control of a Train Operating Unit.

=== The Privatisation Era (1994 -2025) ===
On privatisation in 1994, infrastructure ownership passed to Railtrack and Prism Rail took over operations of the franchise, marketing the route as LTS Rail. Prism Rail were bought out by National Express in 2000 and in 2002 the line was rebranded as c2c.

Ownership of the infrastructure passed to Network Rail in 2002.

National Express sold the operation of the franchise to Trenitalia in 2017.

The station and all trains serving it are currently operated by c2c and are operated by Class 357 and Class 720/6 EMUs.

A more detailed history of the franchises can be found on the c2c page.

Private operation of the London, Tilbury and Southend line by Trenitalia c2c ceased on 20 July 2025, with the new publicly owned operator c2c taking over.

== Operations ==
=== Services ===
In the November 1856 timetable the station was served by four trains per day operating from Fenchurch to Tilbury Riverside, where the train reversed, and then onto Leigh-On-Sea and terminating at Southend. Similarly four trains operated in the other direction.

In the December 1895 timetable. is interesting as it contains a number of Leigh - Southend/Shoeburyness workings during the day as well as nine services to and from London. There were six each way on Sundays [lus an additional two to Southend and Shoeburyness.. The majority of services ran via Upminster and passengers had to change at Pitsea for the line to Tilbury.

Daily services also ran to Leigh-On-Sea from St Pancras, Broad Street and from Ealing Broadway via the District Line. More information on these is on the London, Tilbury and Southend line page.

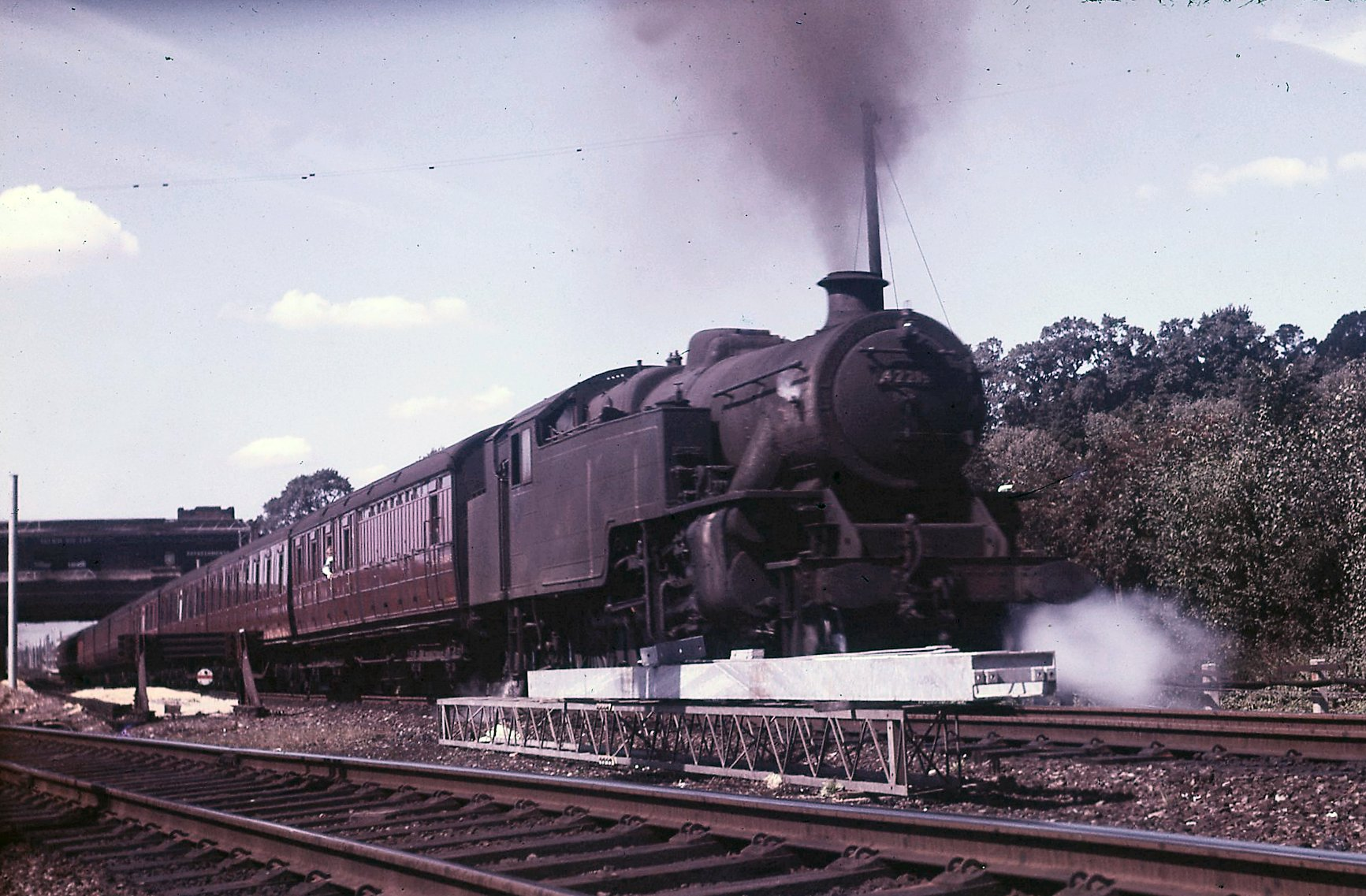
LMS Class 4MT 2-6-4T no 42219 works a passenger train Leigh on Sea, Summer 1961

In July 1923 timetable reflected the change in the working week to half day on Saturday with more trains in the early afternoon. The service had improved at Leigh-On-Sea reflecting the fact that the commuter market was growing at this time.

The standard off-peak service to Leigh-On-Sea via Tilbury in June 1962 - the first all electric off-peak service - was four trains in each direction equally split between the main and Tilbury lines.

As of the June 2024 timetable the typical Monday to Friday off-peak service was:

- 4 tph (trains per hour) westbound to London Fenchurch Street via Basildon
- 2 tph westbound to London Fenchurch Street via Tilbury Town and Ockendon
- 6 tph eastbound to Southend Central of which 4 continue to Shoeburyness

=== Goods ===
When the station was opened two sidings were opened for goods traffic. Leigh-on-sea was still a fishing port and Leigh=On-Sea accounted for a significant portion of the 700 tons were moved by rail annually although fish was not a major commodity for the LT&S.

The 1896 remodelling of the old station saw one of the two sidings removed.

The limitations of the goods yard were one of the reasons for their replacement by new facilities at the 1934 station. Located on the up (sea) side of the station and accessed by an overbridge, the new yard consisted of two long sidings and a long headshunt.

In the September 1962 timetable the goods yard was served by two up services on a weekday namely the 12.50 a.m.Southend to Ripple Lane and the 9.22 a.m. Southend to Ripple Lane.

The goods yard closed on 4 December 1970.

=== Signalling ===
Prior to signalling being introduced trains were kept apart by a time interval system. After a train had departed the next train would not be allowed to depart for an agreed period of time.

The first signal box was provided in 1881 and was located by the level crossing on the up side. This was replaced by a temporary box in 1910 while a new signal box was built on the site of the 1881 structure.

When the new station opened a new signal box named Leigh-On-Sea on that site was opened on 1 January 1934. The old station area was remodelled and the signal box (renamed Leigh-On-Sea Crossing) there was retained to work the level crossing an Up Refuge Loop east of the station. The crossing box lasted until 14 December 1960 when the level crossing was closed.

At the new station the signalling was replaced in 1955 along with the modifications to the station area and then in 1960 the signalling was upgraded to colour light signalling and controlled by Pitsea signal box. However the box was retained and opened when access was required to Platform 2 or the Goods Yard. Otherwise it was switched out. The goods yard connections were removed in 1972 so the box then only existed until 1995 to control access and egress to the reversible line. The 1995 saw this arrangement finish and in 2025 the signalling is controlled by the Upminster signalling centre.

Preceding station	National Rail	Following station
Benfleet	c2c London, Tilbury and Southend line	Chalkwell
Former services
Benfleet	District and LMS through service London, Tilbury and Southend line	Chalkwell
