= Westcliff High School for Boys =

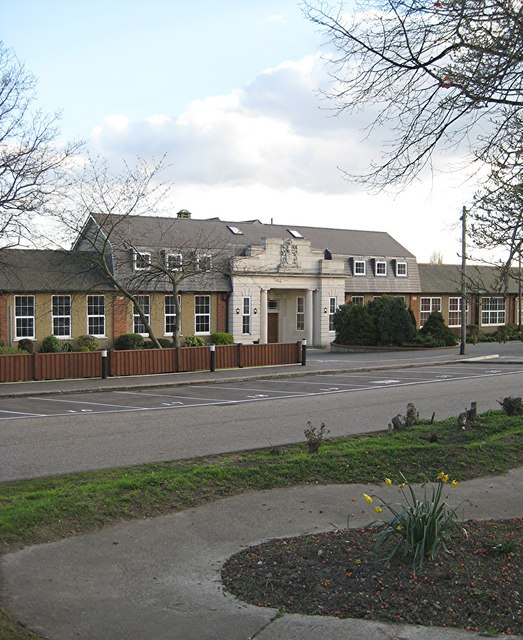
- School badge Front entrance, viewed from the north

Location
- Kenilworth Gardens; Westcliff-on-Sea, Essex, SS0 0BP; England; 51.5529°N 0.6693°E

Information
- Other name: WHSB
- Type: Selective boys academy, with co–educational sixth form
- Motto: Fide Et Fortitudine (By faith and fortitude)
- Established: 1920 (founded), 1926 (current premises)
- Local authority: Southend-on-Sea City Council
- Trust: Westcliff High School for Boys Limited
- Department for Education URN: 136272 Tables
- Ofsted: Reports
- Chair: Fiona Colwell and Anthony Cole
- Headmaster: Michael Skelly
- Gender: Boys; co-educational sixth form
- Age range: 11–18
- Enrolment: 1,267
- Capacity: 1,300
- Houses: Osprey; Merlin; Harrier; Kestrel
- Colours: Rugby; Football; Basketball
- Publication: The Westcliff Diary (termly)
- Alumni: Old Westcliffians
- Website: www.whsb.essex.sch.uk

Westcliff High School for Boys (WHSB) is an 11–18 selective boys academy grammar school in Westcliff-on-Sea, Essex, England. In September 2001 the school was awarded ‘Beacon’ status for its breadth of achievements and quality of work. The school was classed as a humanities college in early 2007 and received a further specialism in science, technology, engineering and mathematics (STEM) on 1 April 2009. The school converted to academy status in 2010.

== History ==
During the 20th century, members of the local community in Westcliff–on–Sea began a drive for the establishment of a new school in the area. The new school was known as The Commercial School and was based in a converted building on Victoria Avenue in Southend-on-Sea. The Commercial School was a co-educational school for the town's rapidly expanding population. Two years later, the school's name changed from The Commercial School to Westcliff High School and by 1926, boys attending the school had moved to the school's present site on Kenilworth Gardens, becoming Westcliff High School for Boys. The school was evacuated to Belper, Derbyshire, in 1940 and shared accommodation with Herbert Strutt School until its return to Westcliff in 1942.

The accompanying girls' school, Westcliff High School for Girls, remained on the Victoria Avenue site until 1930, following their relocation to the same site as Westcliff High School for Boys on Victoria Avenue.

== Overview ==
Westcliff High School for Boys performs well in regards to academic attainment, with academic performance in Key Stage 4 consistently being above 90% in various areas, with 98% of students achieving a strong pass (grade 5) or higher in English and Mathematics. Westcliff High School for Boys is in the highest 16% and highest 20% for all schools in progress and attainment scores respectively. Ofsted's 2023 inspection of the school gave an 'Outstanding' rating across all areas. WHSB's Progress 8 score for the academic year 2023–24 is 0.93, which puts the school in the 'Well above average' performance band.

In The Sunday Times Good Schools Guide 2026, WHSB was ranked 190th among the top joint state and independent secondary schools in the UK. The school achieved 14.8% A* grades at A level, with 50.2% of entries graded A*-A and 77.9% graded A*-B, placing it 253rd nationally for A-level performance. At GCSE, 74.9% of grades were awarded at grades 9–7 (≈ A**-A), resulting in a joint 150th national ranking.

As of September 2025, the school is constituted of 1,292 pupils, with 1,217 boys (94.2%) and 75 girls (5.8%). The sixth form is a mixed sex cohort.

== Headmasters ==
- 1920 – 1942, Herbert Glynne Williams
- 1943 – 1946, Eric Ayres
- 1947 – 1970, Henry Cloke
- 1970 – 1990, Peter Clarke
- 1990 – 2012, Andrew Baker
- 2012 – present, Michael Anthony Skelly

== Notable Old Westcliffians ==
- Maajid Nawaz, activist and former radio presenter
- Alf Adams, professor of physics at the University of Surrey from 1987 to 2008
- Jon Hutton, former Labour cabinet minister whilst Member of Parliament for Barrow and Furness 1992 – 2010, now a life peer since 2010
- Derek Wyatt, former Labour member of Parliament for Sittingbourne and Sheppey 1997–2010. Played rugby union for Oxford University and England
- Peter Bone, disgraced former Conservative MP for Wellingborough and Rushden 2005 – 2023
- Ian James Brackley, former bishop of Dorking
- Gary Brooker, lead singer of the band Procol Harum
- Chris Clarke, leader of Somerset County Council from 1993 to 2000
- Alan Cook, physicist
- Geoffrey Crawley, photographic expert and journalist, and exposer of the Cottingley Fairies hoax
- Edward Greenfield, music critic working for The Guardian from 1977 to 1993
- Benjamin Grosvenor, musician
- Conor Mason, rock musician, guitarist and lead vocalist for Nothing but Thieves
- Neil Harman, chief tennis correspondent, The Times
- Joshua Hayward, musician
- Stuart Jack, Governor of the Cayman Islands from 2005 to 2009
- Wilko Johnson, rock musician, guitarist/vocalist, and songwriter, for Dr. Feelgood
- Peter Mason, journalist and author
- Nigel Maddox, station commander of RAF Bruggen from 1996 to 1999
- David Nixon, magician
- James O'Donnell, organist and choirmaster of Westminster Abbey 2000–2022
- Julian Parkhill, professor of bacterial evolution at the University of Cambridge
- Jamie Reeves, two-time FA Vase winning semi-professional footballer and football pundit
- Eric Sams, musicologist and Shakespeare scholar
