= Chalkwell railway station =

Railway station in Essex, England

Coordinates: 51.539°N 0.671°E

Chalkwell
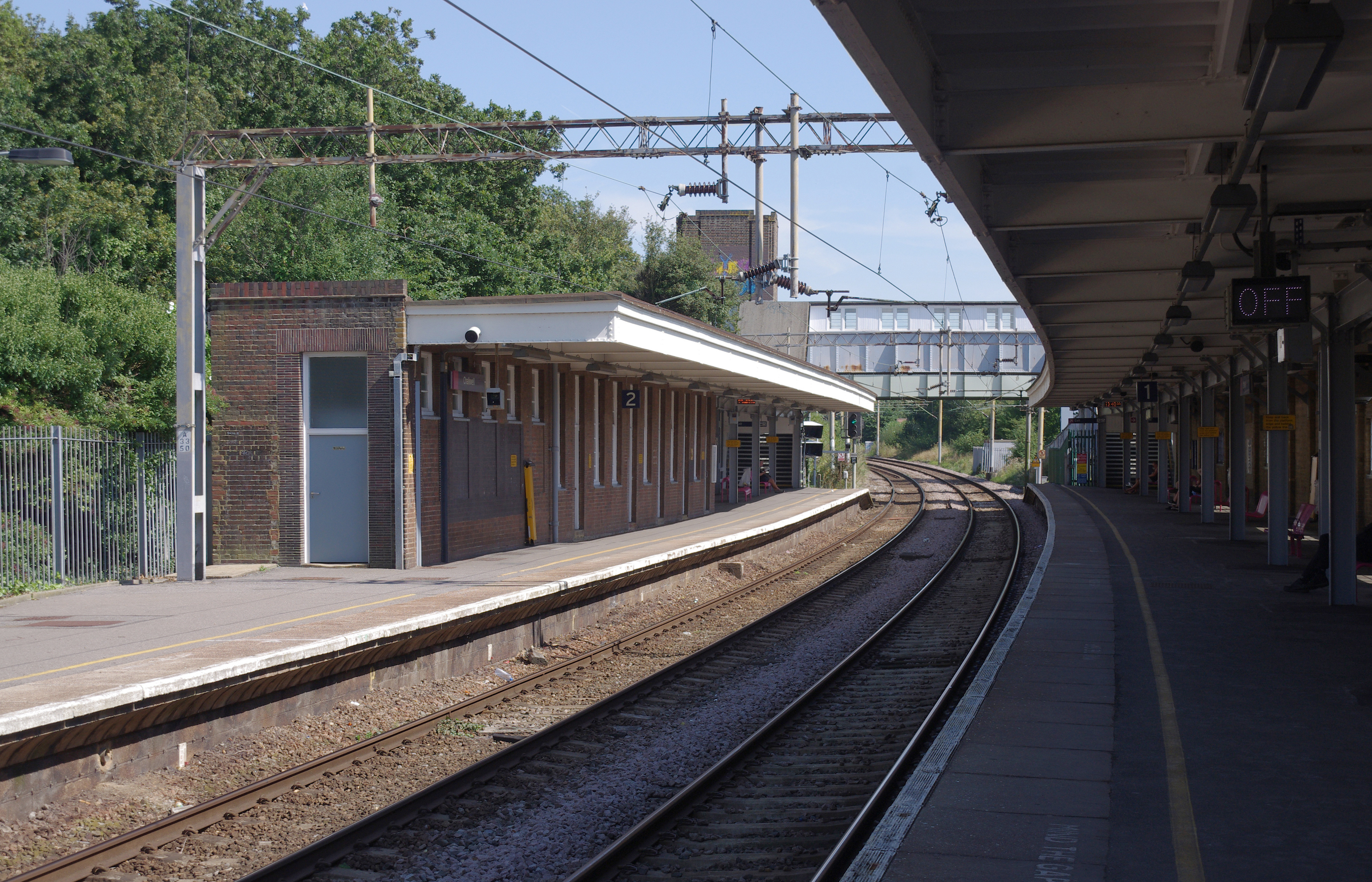

General information
- Location: Chalkwell, Southend-on-Sea; England
- Grid reference: TQ852855
- Manager: c2c
- Platforms: 2

Other information
- Station code: CHW
- Classification: DfT category C2

History
- Opened: 11 September 1933

Passengers
- 2020/21: ▼0.425 million
- 2021/22: ▲0.966 million
- 2022/23: ▲1.183 million
- 2023/24: ▲1.225 million
- 2024/25: ▲1.286 million
Location
Notes
- Passenger statistics from the Office of Rail and Road

Chalkwell railway station is on the London, Tilbury and Southend line, serving the locality of Chalkwell in Southend-on-Sea, Essex. It is 33 miles 69 chains (54.5 km) down the main line from London Fenchurch Street via Basildon and it is situated between Leigh-on-Sea to the west and Westcliff to the east. Its three-letter station code is CHW. The station and all trains serving it are currently operated by c2c.

== History ==
=== London Midland & Scottish Railway ===
When the London Tilbury and Southend Railway (LT&SR) opened from Leigh to Southend in 1856, Chalkwell did not have a station and passengers from there had to travel to the first station at Leigh-on-Sea.

It was not until 1925 that new stations at Leigh on Sea and Chalkwell were suggested which would enable the old and space restricted station at Leigh-On-Sea to close. Chalkwell opened on 11th September 1933, even though trains were stopping at the old Lea-on Sea station until 31 December 1933, when the new Leigh-on-Sea station opened. Aimed at developing commuter traffic from east Leigh-on-Sea and Chalkwell, the station was situated on the seafront just before the line turned inland and climbed a 1 in 37 (2.7%) gradient up to the next station at Westcliff-on-Sea. Leigh season ticket holders were able to change their season tickets for Chalkwell from the opening day.

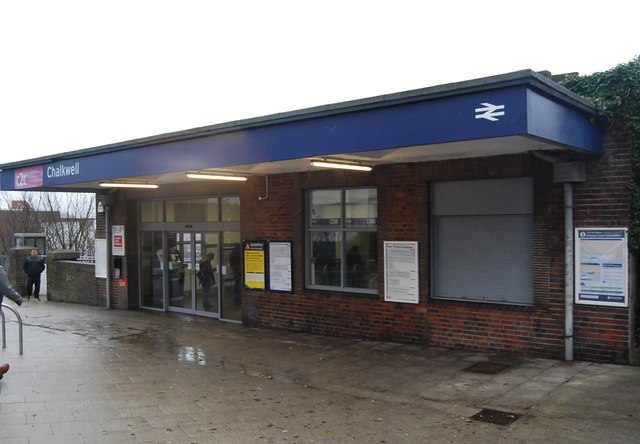
Chalkwell Station building at street level 2013

The station was built with two 700-foot platforms connected by a footbridge (the platforms have since been lengthened – there are no official data, but Chalkwell is able to accommodate the longer 10-car Class 720s which measure approximately 244 metres (801 ft) in length). The main station building was on the downside at the eastern end and set above the platforms which were accessed by the footbridge. The up platform had a 400ft canopy and the rear wall had windows that overlooked the beach. The downside had a shorter 200ft canopy.

=== British Railways (1948-1994) ===
Following nationalisation of Britain's railways in 1948, the station transferred under British Railways to the London Midland Region. On 20 February 1949, the whole LTS line was transferred to the Eastern Region, yet despite the organisational changes, the old LTSR still was a distinctive system operated by former LTS and LMS steam locomotives until electrification.

The North Sea flood of 1953 hit the station hard with flood water rendering the line west of the station unusable between 1 February and 19 February.

During the late 1950s, the LTS was being electrified and re-signalled and the only change at Chalkwell was the extension of the platforms west to take 12 car trains.

A full electric timetable started operating in June 1962 which was primarily worked by Class 302 EMUs.

The LTS line and Chalkwell station became part of the London and South Eastern sector of British Rail in 1982, and in June 1986 this was rebranded as Network South East (NSE). With the Conservative government of the early 1990s looking to privatise the railways, the operation of the NSE passenger train service was put under the control of a Train Operating Unit.

=== The privatisation era (1994-2025) ===
On privatisation in 1994, infrastructure ownership passed to Railtrack and Prism Rail took over operations of the franchise, marketing the route as LTS Rail. Prism Rail were bought out by National Express in 2000 and in 2002 the line was rebranded as c2c.

Ownership of the infrastructure passed to Network Rail in 2002.

National Express sold the operation of the franchise to Trenitalia in 2017.

The station and all trains serving it are currently operated by c2c and are operated by Class 357 and Class 720/6 EMUs.

A more detailed history of the franchises can be found on the c2c page.

Private operation of the London, Tilbury and Southend line by Trenitalia c2c ceased on 20 July 2025, with the new publicly owned operator c2c taking over.

== Design ==
There is no step-free access available.

== Services ==
As of the June 2024 timetable the typical Monday to Friday off-peak service is:

- 4 tph (trains per hour) westbound to London Fenchurch Street via Basildon (2 tph all stations and 2 tph semi-fast)
- 2 tph westbound to London Fenchurch Street via Tilbury Town and Ockendon
- 6 tph eastbound to Southend Central, of which 4 tph continue to Shoeburyness

Preceding station	National Rail	Following station
Leigh-on-Sea	c2c London, Tilbury and Southend line	Westcliff
