= Jamie Reeves (footballer) =

English footballer (born 1953)

Personal information
- Date of birth: 5 March 1953 (age 73)
- Place of birth: Essex, England
- Position: Striker

Senior career*
Years	Team	Apps	(Gls)
- Billericay Town
1979	Chelmsford City	3	(0)
- Stansted
- Tyrwhitt Soccerites
- * Club domestic league appearances and goals

Jamie Reeves (born 5 March 1953) is a regular football pundit on ESPN STAR Sports coverage of the English Premier League. He was formerly a semi-professional football player in England's Southern League, Isthmian League and Essex Senior League, and won the FA Vase twice (in 1979 and 1984). He then moved to Singapore where he played in the FAS Premier League, before becoming a television pundit.

== Biography ==
Born in Essex, United Kingdom, Jamie attended the Westcliff High School for Boys, where he developed an interest in both Cricket and Rugby. He received a bachelor's degree in economics at the University of Leicester in 1973, and a master's degree in Quantitative Social Science from the University of Kent at Canterbury in 1975.

After his graduation, he switched to soccer at the age of 22. He was soon spotted by his local semi-professional team and quickly moved through the ranks of non-league soccer, culminating in a winning appearance (4–1) at Wembley Stadium in 1979 for Billericay Town in the FA Vase. Five years later he reappeared at the same venue in the same competition, this time winning 3–2 with Stansted in what The Times described as "the biggest upset in FA Vase history".

After 13 years playing semi-professionally in the Southern League, Isthmian League and Essex Senior League, Jamie hung up his boots and within a year moved to Singapore. He briefly came out of retirement for one season in the FAS Premier League (the forerunner of the S.League), playing for the now-defunct team Tyrwhitt Soccerites. He established a reputation for scoring with headers, and at the end of the season was named the league's second best player of the year by The Straits Times.

First appearing on TV in May 1992, working in the studio on the FA Cup Final between Liverpool and Sunderland, Jamie went on to do commentary work on the Malaysia Cup and the S.League before joining ESPN Star Sports. There, he has commentated on the Chinese Super League, the K-League, the UEFA Champions League, the Asian Games, the Asian World Cup Qualifiers and the Tiger Cup, as well as dabbling in La Liga and Serie A. He first worked as a studio pundit on the Premier League in the 2000–01 season, and has been heavily involved with commenting on that league ever since.

From 1990 to 2015, he also worked as an Economics teacher in Singapore. Before his retirement in December 2015, he was the Programme Head for the Humanities Programme at Raffles Institution.

Reeves is married with two children.

== Honours ==
Billericay Town

- FA Vase: 1979

Stansted

- FA Vase: 1984
