= Geoffrey Crawley =

Geoffrey Crawley (10 December 1926 – 29 October 2010) was a photographic expert and journalist, and was the editor in chief of British Journal of Photography for two decades. He was noted for exposing the photographs of the Cottingley Fairies taken in the early 20th century as a hoax.

Crawley was born in 1926 in Bow in London, and moved with his parents to Southend-on-Sea when he was four years old, later moving to Leigh-on-Sea. He was educated at Westcliff High School for Boys, and during World War II he was evacuated to Derbyshire where he was placed with a miner and his family. Already skilled at the piano, Crawley convinced his hosts to purchase a piano to allow him to continue practising. As a child he learned photography from his father. He showed early talent at the piano, and pursued a performance career. He studied French and German at Selwyn College, Cambridge. Ill health forced him to abandon both his plans to become a professional musician and his studies.

Crawley enjoyed a long career with BJP, joining in the 1960s as a contributor. He became the technical editor, and was promoted to editor in 1967, a position he held for 21 years. Following the sale of the magazine, he reassumed the position of technical editor, continuing until 2000, when he was in his seventies. In 2000 he moved to the Amateur Photographer, where he was a contributor until shortly before his death.

In the 1980s, he published a series of articles debunking the Cottingley Fairies hoax, a series of photographs that had been taken by Elsie Wright and Frances Griffiths starting in 1917 that purported to show the girls together with actual fairies and were used by Arthur Conan Doyle and others as evidence of the existence of supernatural entities. While there were longstanding claims that the photographs were hoaxes, Crawley undertook "a scientific and analytical approach" to analyzing the images starting in the 1970s. After studying the capabilities of some of the cameras that had been used to take the photos, Crawley concluded that they would have been unable to capture images as sharp as the ones in the purported unaltered photographs. In a series of articles published in the British Journal of Photography in the early 1980s, Crawley concluded that the images had been manipulated and that the fairies were a hoax. The cousins would later admit that one of the girls had copied images of fairies from a book onto cardboard cutouts that were then photographed. Frances insisted that the final photo in the series was genuine, though Elsie acknowledged that they were all fakes.

Crawley died at the age of 83 on 29 October 2010 at his home in Westcliff-on-Sea. He was survived by his wife, Carolyn and his son Thomas .
