= Julian Parkhill =

Geneticist, working with pathogens

Julian Parkhill FRS FMedSci
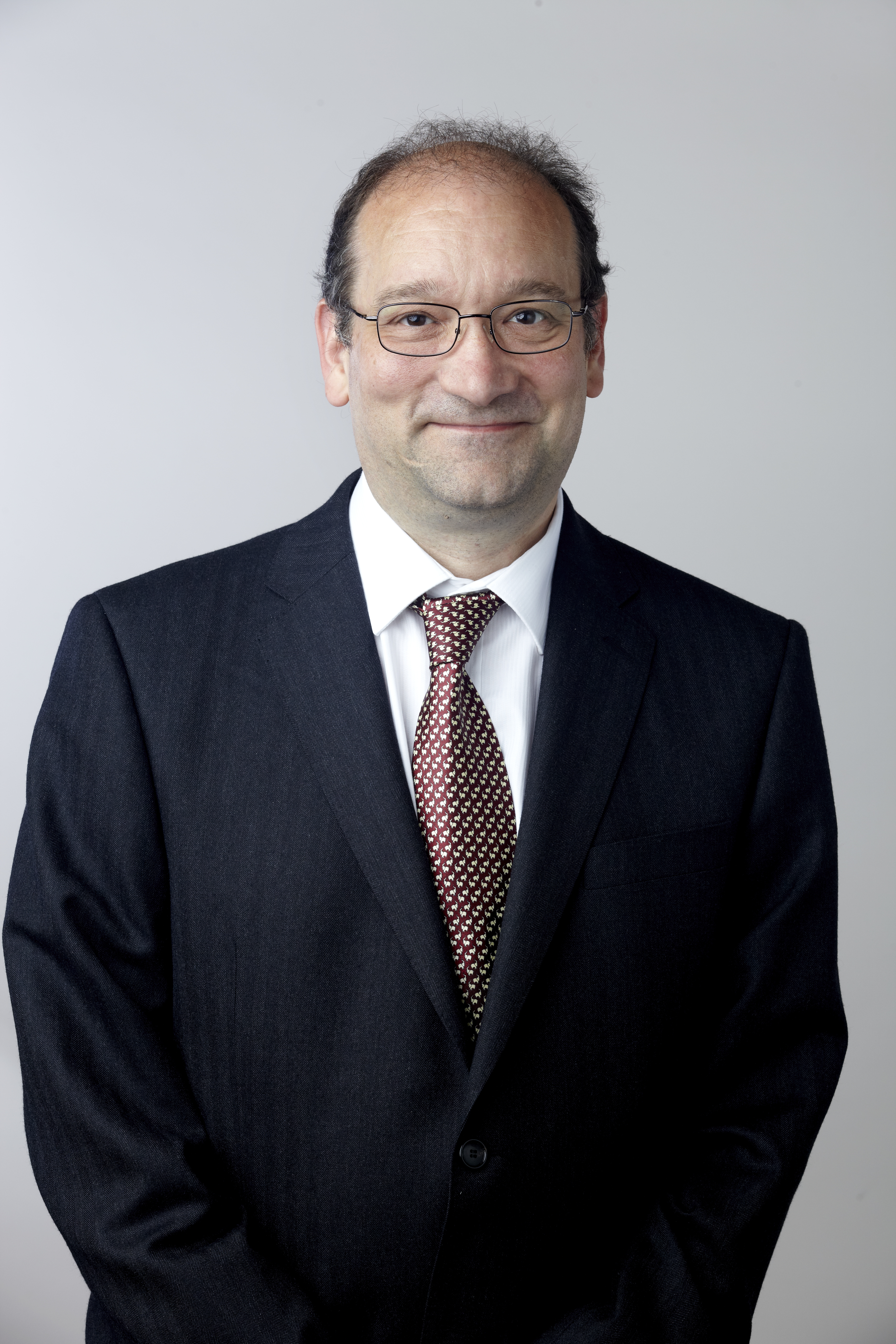
- Parkhill in 2015
- Born: 23 September 1964 (age 61); Leigh-on-Sea
- Education: Westcliff High School for Boys
- Alma mater: University of Birmingham (BSc); University of Bristol (PhD)
- Known for: ARTEMIS
- Scientific career
- Fields: Genomics; Microbiology; Bioinformatics; Evolution; Infectious diseases
- Institutions: University of Birmingham; University of Cambridge; Wellcome Trust Sanger Institute
- Thesis: Regulation of transcription of the mercury resistance operon of Tn501 (1991)
- Website: www.vet.cam.ac.uk/staff/professor-julian-parkhill-frs-fmedsci

Julian Parkhill (born 1964) is Marks & Spencer Professor of Farm Animal Health, Food Science and Food Safety at the University of Cambridge. He previously served as head of pathogen genomics at the Wellcome Sanger Institute.

== Education ==
Parkhill was educated at Westcliff High School for Boys, the University of Birmingham and the University of Bristol where he was awarded a PhD in 1991 for research into the regulation of transcription of the mercury resistance operon.

== Career and research ==
Parkhill uses high throughput sequencing and phenotyping to study pathogen diversity and variation, how they affect virulence and transmission, and what they tell us about the evolution of pathogenicity and host–pathogen interaction. Research in the Parkill Laboratory has been funded the Wellcome Trust, the Biotechnology and Biological Sciences Research Council (BBSRC) and the Medical Research Council (MRC).

=== Awards and honours ===
Parkhill was elected a Fellow of the Academy of Medical Sciences (FMedSci) in 2009, and a Fellow of the American Academy of Microbiology (FAAM) in 2012.

Dr. Julian Parkhill is currently Head of Pathogen Genomics at the Wellcome Trust Sanger Institute. Over the last decade or so, his group has analysed the genomes of many bacteria of fundamental importance for human health, including the causative agents of tuberculosis, plague, typhoid fever, whooping cough, leprosy, botulism, diphtheria and meningitis, as well as nosocomial pathogens such as Clostridioides difficile and MRSA, and food-borne pathogens such as Campylobacter jejuni, Salmonella Typhimurium and Yersinia enterocolitica. Their current research focuses on the application of high-throughput sequencing techniques to microbiology. They are currently sequencing very large collections of bacterial isolates with broad geographic and temporal spreads, linking genomic variation to epidemiology, acquisition of drug resistance, and recent evolution. In addition, they are working with local and national clinical microbiology groups to build the foundations for the transfer of microbial sequencing to clinical and public health investigations. They are also applying sequencing technologies to phenotypic investigations, particularly saturation transposon mutagenesis, transcriptomics and high-throughput phenotyping. They collaborate widely, particularly with groups in developing countries where infectious diseases are endemic.

Parkhill was elected a Fellow of the Royal Society (FRS) in 2014, his certificate of election reads:

Julian Parkhill has played a major role in determining the reference genome sequences of many key bacterial pathogens, including Mycobacterium tuberculosis, Yersinia pestis and Salmonella typhi. As well as providing complete catalogues of the arsenal of genes carried by each bacterium, Parkhill's work has led to important insights into how bacterial genomes evolve and the effect of variation within supposedly homogeneous bacterial populations. In parallel, tools to understand and visualise genomic data have been developed, and freely disseminated worldwide. Over a decade, Parkhill has been at the forefront of bacterial genomics, most recently using new high throughput sequencing technologies to explore evolution and transmission in bacterial pathogens, and enable the clinical use of these approaches.
