= Westcliff-on-Sea =

Town in Essex, England

Coordinates: 51.5359°N 0.6970°E

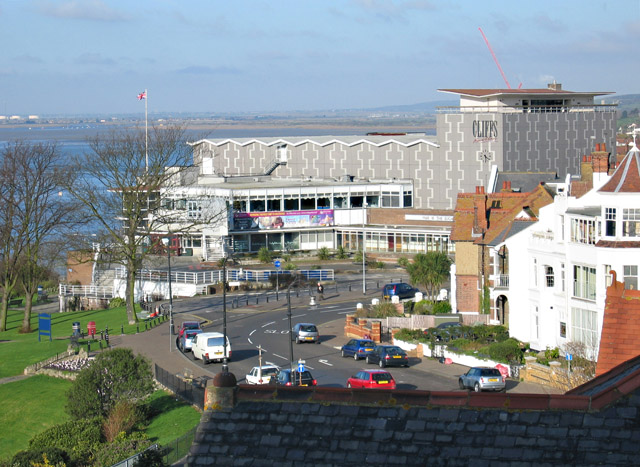
- The Cliffs Pavilion above the Thames Estuary

- Location within Essex
- Population: 21,108 (2011 Census. Chalkwell and Milton Wards)
- OS grid reference: TQ865855
- Unitary authority: Southend-on-Sea
- Ceremonial county: Essex
- Region: East
- Country: England
- Sovereign state: United Kingdom
- Post town: WESTCLIFF-ON-SEA
- Postcode district: SS0
- Dialling code: 01702
- Police: Essex
- Fire: Essex
- Ambulance: East of England
- UK Parliament: Southend West

Westcliff-on-Sea (previously known as Milton, often abbreviated to Westcliff, and in the past spelt as Westcliffe-on-Sea) is a suburb of the city of Southend-on-Sea, located within the ceremonial county of Essex, England. It is on the north shore of the lower Thames Estuary, about 37 miles (55 km) east of London. The Westcliff-on-Sea area is described by Southend-on-Sea City Council as having a border in the east with Milton Road, Hamlet Court Road and Gainsborough Drive; Prittlewell Chase to the North and Valkyrie Road/ London Road/ Southbourne Grove in the west. Traditionally Westcliff included Chalkwell. (Note: Church of England terms.)

== Topology ==
The southern area of what is now known as Westcliff, south of the London Road, was known as Milton or Milton Hamlet until the period 1860–1880 when the Milton Estate and surrounding land was sold to speculators who preferred the name Westcliff-on-Sea. The name Milton was derived from being in the middle between Leigh and Southchurch, with the settlement said to be from where Leigh Road meets Chalkwell Park to the mayor's residence at Porters.

== History ==
The manor of the Milton (spelt in old English as Meleton), was first recorded as being given to the monks at Canterbury in 959. By the Domesday Book in 1086, Milton had grown to an agricultural community covering 240 acres, and by 1086 the annual value of the estate was 100 shillings. By the end of the 13th century, the manor was managed for the church by a Serjeant, a man whose position in the feudal society was between a Yeoman and a Knight. The Serjeant was paid 13 shillings and 4 pence a year to manage the estate, which in 1291 was worth an annual rate of £18, 7 shillings and 6 pence. By 1301, the Prior Henry of Eastry acted as the Lord of the Manor, and instigated a building programme which included a new mill costing £15, 5 shillings and 10 pence. The settlement had grown to include its own court and gallows. However, in 1327 a great flood hit Milton which saw over 40 acres of land lost to the sea and the Hamlet Water Mill was submerged. Supposedly, according to legend, the flood destroyed Milton's church. During the Black Death, there was no recorded human casualties, but the community lost seven oxen, eleven cows and their calves and sixty sheep. During the Peasants' Revolt led by Wat Tyler, the villagers attacked the hall and destroyed the manorial records. With England at war with France, a warning beacon was erected in 1387 at what us now Clifftown Parade, which was recorded as still standing in 1667.

The protestant martyr John Frith was captured on the shore at Milton trying to escape in 1532. At the end of the English Reformation, Henry VIII granted the manor to Richard Rich, 1st Baron Rich. By the time the station opened in 1895, it was named Westcliff not Milton. The area between Milton Road and Hamlet Court Road was named The Hamlet by the original developers Brassey, Peto, Betts & Co. when they developed it as a "high class suburban retreat". Milton Hall was demolished in 1900 to be replaced by a convent and care home called Nazereth House, on the London Road, which was itself demolished in 2024 to make way for retirement apartments. Hamlet Court was a large house in the area between Hamlet Court Road, Canewdon Road, and Ditton Court Road and was demolished in 1929.

== Geography ==
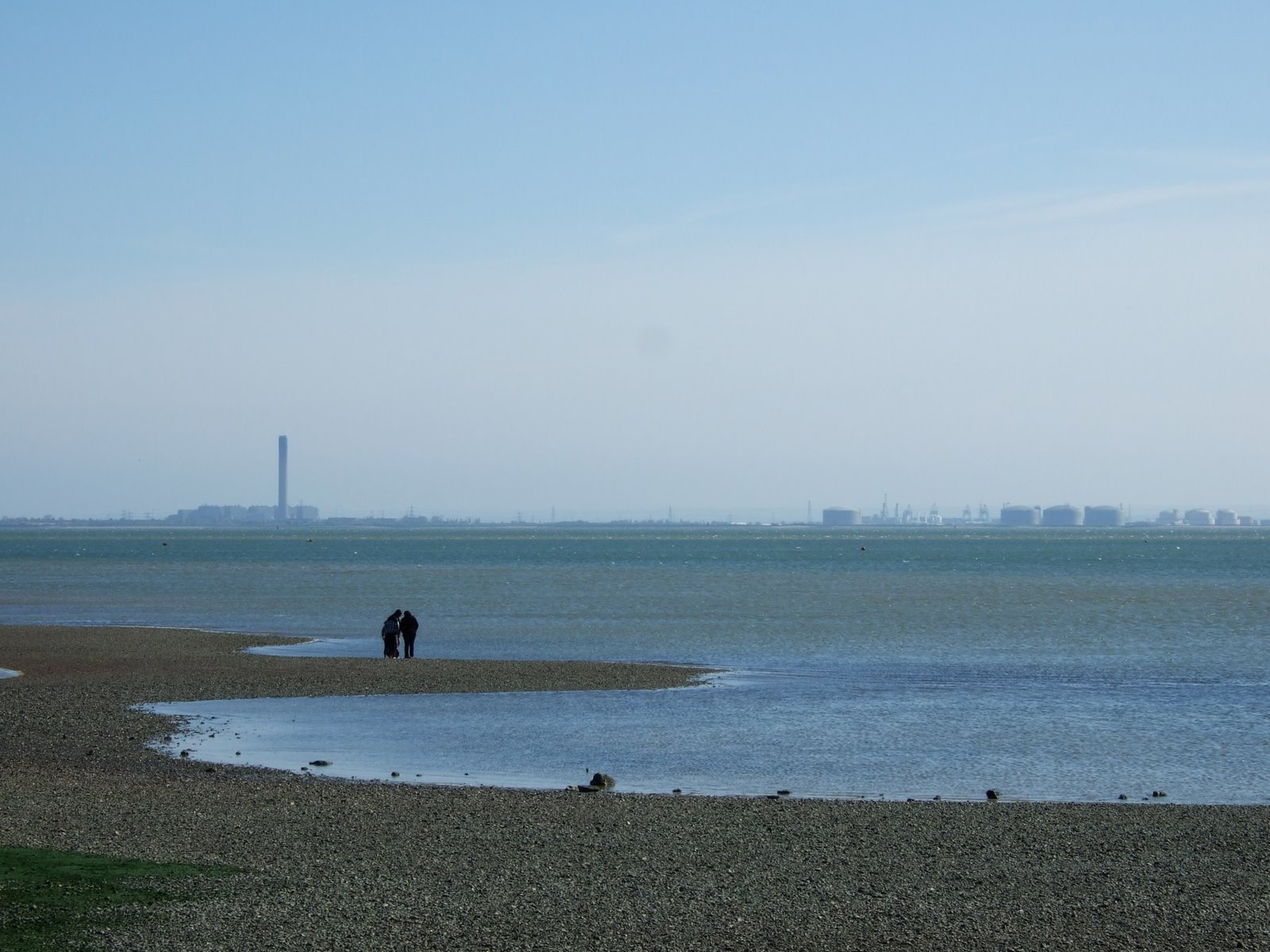
View south-east over the Thames Estuary to the Isle of Grain, Kent from the shore at Westcliff-On-Sea

The cliffs formed by erosion of the local quaternary geology give views over the Thames Estuary towards the Kent coastline to the south. The coastline has been transformed into sandy beaches through the use of groynes and imported sand. The estuary at this point has extensive mud flats. At low tide, the water typically retreats some 600 m from the beach, leaving the mud flats exposed.

== Governance ==
Westcliff-on-Sea is covered by several wards under Southend-on-Sea City Council, including some that fall outside of the designated area of Westcliff. The wards are:

- Westborough
- Milton
- Victoria
- Prittlewell

== Transport ==
The London, Tilbury and Southend Railway route passing through the suburb was completed to Southend in 1856 but the Westcliff railway station in Station Road was not opened until 1895. It is now managed by c2c.

== Education ==
Westcliff is served by two selective secondary schools: Westcliff High School for Girls and Westcliff High School for Boys, two Catholic secondary schools: St Thomas More High School for boys and St Bernard's High School, Westcliff-on-Sea for girls, and the non selective Chase High School.

== Architecture ==
Several areas of Westcliff have been classified as conservation areas: Clifftown bordering Southend town centre and including Prittlewell Square gardens, Shorefield and the Leas towards the sea front, and Milton focused on the Park Estate between Park Street and Milton Road. The Milton Conservation Area includes the Grade II listed building which was formerly the Wesleyan Chapel (Park Road Methodist Church). This was completed in 1872 to the design of Elijah Hoole (1837-1912) and was Southend's first permanent Methodist Church.

Westcliff contains a number of other Grade II listed buildings: Our Lady Help of Christians and St Helen's Church in Milton Road, the Church of Saint Alban the Martyr in St John's Road, the former Havens department store in Hamlet Court Road, Marteg House in Annerley Road, Westcliff Library in London Road, and the Palace Theatre. Westcliff Library, designed by Patrick Burridge, the council's architect in 1956, was built on a site damaged by bombing in World War II. The building was listed as Grade II in 1998.

The official list entries for these are available from Historic England on the National Heritage List for England.

== Economy ==
The main shopping area in Westcliff-on-Sea is Hamlet Court Road, where the department store Havens established itself in 1901, and remained the anchor store until its closure in 2017. Hamlet Court Road took its name from a manor house called the Hamlet Court, which stood on land now occupied by Pavarotti's restaurant and adjoining shops, facing towards the sea with sweeping gardens down to the rail line. The road later developed into a strong independent retail area and quickly became famous outside the area as the Bond Street of Essex. There were many haberdashers and specialist shops, and it was not too unusual to see chauffeurs waiting for their employers to emerge from the shops.

The economic recessions of the 1980s and 1990s saw the area decline. The road underwent a £1 million regeneration in the early 2000s and a further regeneration in 2010. Further plans have been put forward by Southend-on-Sea City Council to pedestrianise half of the street, while the local historical organisation, the Milton Society is campaigning to regenerate the road on the lines of Margate and the Cathedral Quarter in Derby.

The Milton Ward in Westcliff is one of the most deprived areas in England. The ward is mostly in the top 20% most deprived areas in the East of England, but some of the ward is in the top 10% most deprived areas in the country.

== Leisure ==
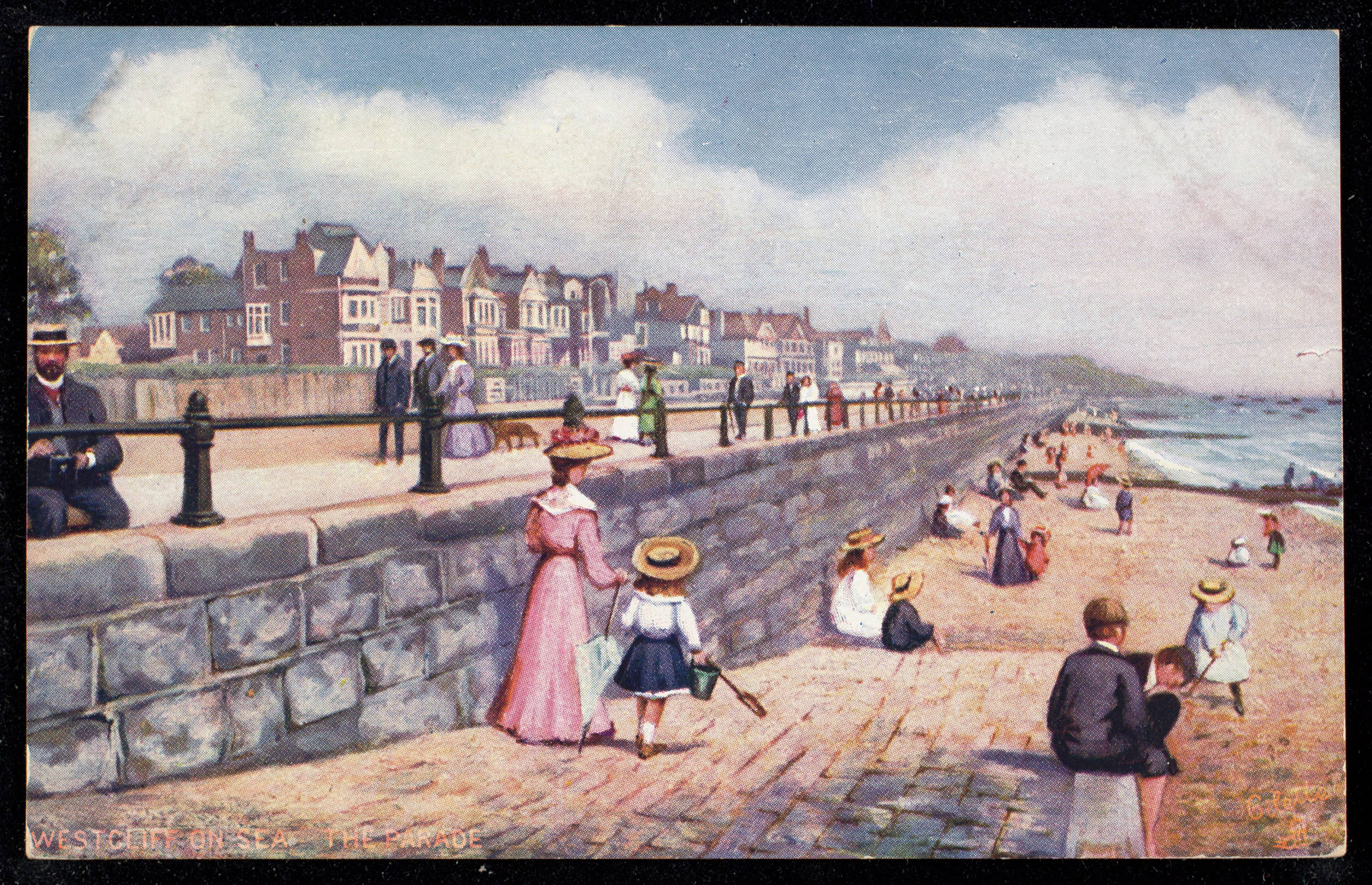
The Parade at Westcliff-on-Sea (1903)

The two main theatres in Westcliff are the Cliffs Pavilion, which overlooks the seafront, and the Palace Theatre situated on the London Road.

Westcliff-on-Sea is also home to the Thames Estuary Yacht Club and the Genting Casino Westcliff. Westcliff RFC currently play in National League 2 East, the fourth tier of the English rugby union system.

== In Literature ==
Westcliff is the location for the French novel Un souvenir by Michel Déon.

== Notable people ==
- Sir Edwin Arnold (1832–1904), poet and journalist, lived at Hamlet Court from 1878.
- David Atkinson (1940-2012), politician
- Trevor Bailey (1923–2011), Test cricketer and cricket writer and broadcaster, was born there.
- John Barber (1919–2004), former Finance Director of Ford of Europe and managing director of British Leyland.
- Dorothea Bate (1878-1951), Welsh palaeontologist and pioneer of archaeozoology, died in Westcliff-on-Sea
- E. Power Biggs (1906–1977), concert organist was born there.
- Robert Williams Buchanan (1841–1901), poet, novelist and playwright, lived at Hamlet Court from 1884.
- Dick Clement (born 1937) comedy writer and director, was born there.
- Geoffrey Crawley (1926-2010), photographic expert and journalist. He was the editor in chief of British Journal of Photography for two decades and was noted for exposing the photographs of the Cottingley Fairies taken in the early 20th century as a hoax.
- Josh Cullen (born 1996), professional footballer who currently plays for Burnley and the Republic of Ireland national team.
- Sir Philip Cunliffe-Owen (1828–1894), curator and Director of the South Kensington Museum in London lived at Hamlet Court.
- Lee Evans (born 1964), comedian. Lived in Westcliff.
- Anne Firth, actress, (1918–1961)
- Jean Floud (1915–2013), sociologist and academic, was born there.
- Edward Greenfield (1928–2015) chief music writer in The Guardian from 1977 to 1993 and biographer of Andre Previn was born there and attended Westcliff High School for Boys.
- John Horsely (1920–2014), actor, was born there.
- Wilko Johnson (1947–2022) guitarist, singer and songwriter attended Westcliff High School for Boys and lived in Westcliff until his death.
- Frank Matcham (1854–1920), theatre architect, retired to 28 Westcliff Parade, Westcliff-on-Sea and died there in 1920.

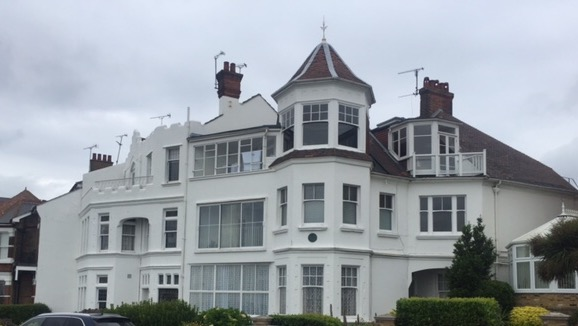
Matcham's house in Westcliff-on-Sea, Essex

- Hugh Sells (1922–1978), first-class cricketer and Royal Air Force officer.
- Sir Bernard Arthur Owen Williams (1929–2003), English moral philosopher.
- Charles Leslie Wrenn (1895-1969), scholar and Rawlinson and Bosworth Professor of Anglo-Saxon 1945-1963.
