= Havens, Westcliff-on-Sea =

Former department store in Westcliff-on-Sea, Essex

Coordinates: 51.5403°N 0.6952°E

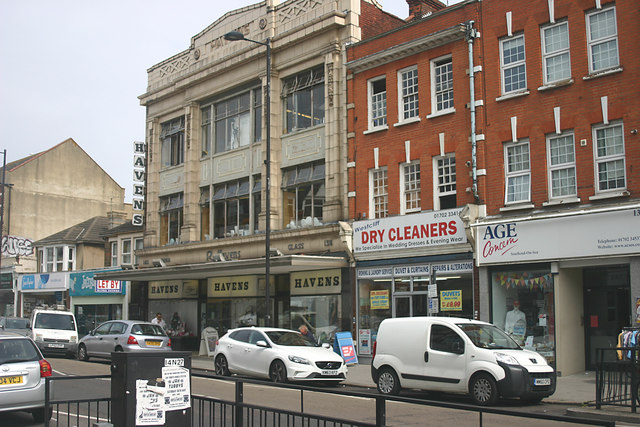
Havens (left) in 2015

Havens department store is a Grade II listed building based in Westcliff-on-Sea, Essex. Until its closure in 2017, Havens was the only remaining independent department store based in the borough of Southend-on-Sea after the closure of Keddies.

== History ==
Havens was opened in 1901 by Rawdon Havens as a specialist retailers of China Tableware and Crystal Glass in Hamlet Court Road, Westcliff.

The current store was opened in 1935 and was listed as Grade II in 2016.

In May 2017, Nigel Haven announced that the store would be closing and moving to an online retailer only. The building was rented to Age Concern as a community hub.
