= ChileHardware =

Computer hardware review web site

CHW, formerly ChileHardware, was a Spanish language computer hardware review web site. The site was founded by Christian Montero, Felipe Figueroa and Juan Pablo Adaro, in January 2004 to help and show people new technologies. The site is based in South America, and writes about information technology trade shows, daily news, first hand hardware reviews and columns.

== History ==
In 2006, the web site was restructured, after which Montero and Adaro left. Figueroa was left in charge, and Juan Francisco Diez became his assistant. Later that year, CHW launched a web site called TecnoSquad, based on consumer electronics and other blogs like Engadget and Gizmodo. In 2007, the web site BotonTurbo was launched, which was a video game console oriented blog. During 2007, the web site incorporated as an LLC company, with the help of Felipe Encinas and Luis Felipe Castillo as minor partners, and stood as a media network under the unofficial name Sconf Networks.

== Merging with Betazeta ==
In 2008, the company underwent another restructure. After mild and unsuccessful alliances with PCFactory and Terra Networks, the owners opted for Sconf Networks (CHW, TecnoSquad and BotonTurbo) to be merged with Zetacorp Networks, the media group in charge of FayerWayer, a tech savvy blog, and Saborizante, a web site dedicated to social life and events. The new media network was renamed Betazeta. TecnoSquad was absorbed into a new project called Wayerless, which was devoted to mobile and hand held e-reader. BotonTurbo was re-branded to Niubie.

== Content ==
CHW focuses on technology rumors, how-to tutorials, hardware reviews and opinion articles. CHW started producing content by re-printing news stories, and has advanced to producing original content and getting exclusives. The company learns about new content through attending IDF, Computex, CES, CeBIT and other information technology trade shows, and it maintains close contact with tech brands such as AMD, Intel, NVIDIA, HP, Samsung, MSI, Foxconn, ECS, Gigabyte and Kingston Technologies.

== Forums ==
CHW maintains a forums board, where readers can discuss information technology. It has 350.000 members and 4 million posts.
