= Tilbury Town railway station =

Railway station in Essex, England

Coordinates: 51.462°N 0.354°E

Tilbury Town

General information
- Location: Tilbury, Thurrock; England
- Grid reference: TQ636763
- Manager: c2c
- Platforms: 2

Other information
- Station code: TIL
- Classification: DfT category D

Key dates
- 15 June 1885: Opened as Tilbury Dock
- 3 August 1934: Renamed Tilbury Town
- 1992: Tilbury Riverside closed

Passengers
- 2020/21: ▼0.589 million
- Interchange: ▼13,744
- 2021/22: ▲0.925 million
- Interchange: ▲32,171
- 2022/23: ▲0.959 million
- Interchange: ▲0.111 million
- 2023/24: ▲0.998 million
- Interchange: ▼60,468
- 2024/25: ▲1.111 million
- Interchange: ▼22,660
Location
Notes
- Passenger statistics from the Office of Rail and Road

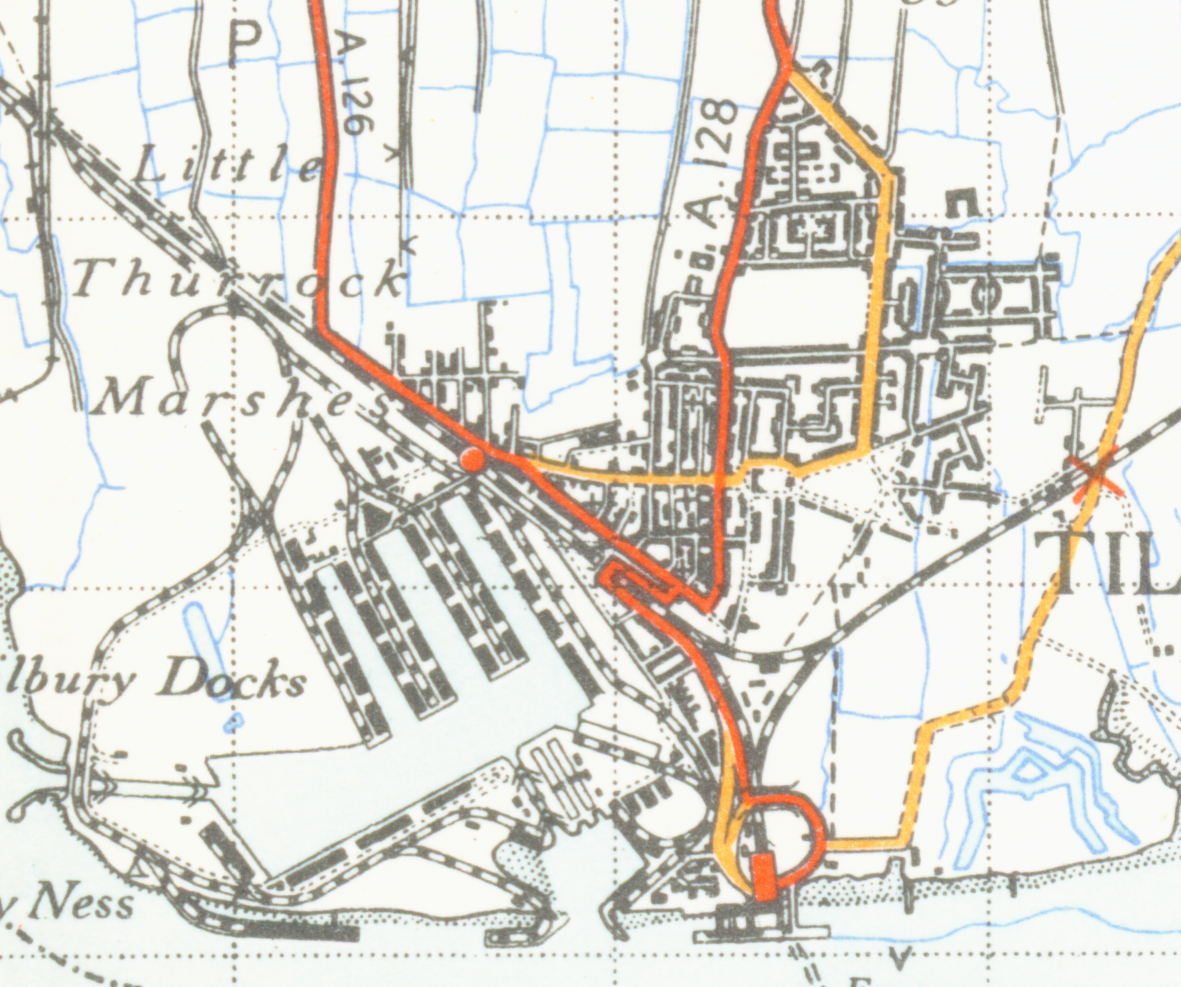
A 1946 Ordnance Survey map showing the station, Tilbury Riverside and the triangular junction

Tilbury Town railway station is on a loop line of the London, Tilbury and Southend line, serving the town of Tilbury, Essex (also known as Tilbury Town). It is 21 miles 48 chains (34.8 km) down the line from London Fenchurch Street via Rainham and it is situated between Grays and East Tilbury. Its three-letter station code is TIL.

The station was opened on 15 June 1885 with the name Tilbury Dock by the London, Tilbury and Southend Railway. It was renamed Tilbury Town on 3 August 1934. It is on a link known as the Tilbury Loop, which joins the main line at the London end at Barking and at the country end at Pitsea. A bus link is provided for the Gravesend ferry, replacing the rail link to Tilbury Riverside which was closed in 1992.

Today, the station and all trains serving it are operated by c2c.

== History ==
=== Early Years (1854–1923) ===
The railway was built through the site of Tilbury and opened on 11 April 1854 to Tilbury Station where ferries connected across the River Thames to Gravesend. Just east of the station a junction called Tilbury West Junction was opened on 14 August 1854 and passenger operations commenced to Stanford-Le-Hope and by 1856 to Southend. A further junction at Tilbury East Junction was provided giving a direct link between Tilbury and this line. No station was provided on the Tilbury Town site at the time because the area was largely undeveloped.

It was the development of Tilbury Docks between 1882 and 1886 that saw a rise in the number numbers of workers living in the area.

A railway station consisting of an up and down platform was provided and opened to workmen sometime in 1884 and to goods in 1885. The goods siding was on the up side and initially dealt with chalk used in building the docks. There was no footbridge so workmen (from the London direction) probably crossed the line at end of the platform to get to the docks area.

The station area was controlled by a new signal box opened in 1886, and a two siding goods yard was provided on the down side.

The station, then named Tilbury Docks opened to passengers 17 April 1886 and a rail connection into the main dock area was provided west of the station site. This was also the official opening day of the docks themselves. Station buildings were provided on the up (docks) side of the line. Additional platform structures and a footbridge were provided sometime in the following decade.

The Midland Railway took over the LT&SR on 7 August 1912 and Tilbury Docks station became a Midland Railway station. A new signal box was provided by the Midland in 1922.

=== London Midland And Scottish Railway (1923–1947) ===
Following the Railways Act 1921 the station became the responsibility of the London Midland and Scottish (LMS) railway from 1 January 1923.

At the request of Tilbury Council both Tilbury Dock and Tilbury stations were renamed. Tilbury Dock became Tilbury Town (for Tilbury Docks) to reflects its proximity to the town and Tilbury became Tilbury Riverside on 3 August 1934.

World War 2 saw significant traffic at the station dues to activities in the adjacent docks.

=== British Railways (1948–1994) ===
Following nationalisation of Britain's railways in 1948, the station transferred under British Railways to the London Midland Region. On 20 February 1949, the whole LTS line was transferred to the Eastern Region, yet despite the organisational changes, the old LTSR still was a distinctive system operated by former LTS and LMS locomotives until electrification.

Electrification and re-signalling saw a number of changes to the station. The platform were raised during December 1958 and the footbridge removed because it was too low for the overhead power lines in 1960. There was an adjacent and higher Port of London Authority footbridge which was used instead. When built this had extended into the docks area and was a major entry point for dock workers.

As a result of the re-signalling in advance of electrification, the Midland design box of 1922 and the two-track goods yard were both closed during 1961. Electrification was completed in November 1961 and the first all electric timetable ran in June 1962 worked by British Rail Class 302 EMUs.

New station buildings were provided in 1964/65 and all old structures demolished. These had a short life and needed replacement by the 1990s when they were replaced with more modern structures and a new footbridge provided in the early 1990s.

30 November 1992 saw the withdrawal of the service through to Tilbury Riverside which was replaced by a bus after which the station was only served by Fenchurch Street or Southend trains.

=== Privatisation era (1994–2025) ===
The platforms were lengthened for 12-car operation in 2011.

On privatisation in 1996, infrastructure ownership passed to Railtrack and Prism Rail took over operations of the franchise, marketing the route as LTS Rail. Prism Rail were bought out by National Express in 2000 and in 2002 the line was rebranded as c2c.

Ownership of the infrastructure passed to Network Rail in 2002.

National Express sold the operation of the franchise to Trenitalia in 2017.

The station and all trains serving it are currently operated by c2c and are operated by Class 357 and Class 720/6 EMUs.

A detailed history of the franchises can be found on the c2c page.

Private operation of the London, Tilbury and Southend line by Trenitalia c2c ceased on 20 July 2025, with the new publicly owned operator c2c taking over.

== Services ==
As of the June 2024 timetable the typical Monday to Friday off-peak service is:

- 2 tph (trains per hour) westbound to London Fenchurch Street via Ockendon
- 2 tph eastbound to Southend Central

== In popular culture ==
The station plays two roles in the 2009 film Fish Tank – it appears in the film, and the star, Katie Jarvis, was recruited after a scout saw her arguing with her boyfriend at Tilbury Town station.

The station and its environs in the Victorian era are also mentioned briefly in Robert Roberts' 1895 book Diary of a Voyage to Australia, New Zealand, and Other Lands, written a mere 10 years after the station opened.

The station appears in the 2016 film, Grimsby where it was temporarily rebranded from "Tilbury Town" to "Grimsby Town" to match the setting where the main characters grew up.

== Tilbury North Junction ==
This junction is where the lines into the main part of the Tilbury Docks diverged. Some exchange sidings existed and the wagons would be worked forward into the docks by a dock owned locomotive. Boat trains carrying passengers and their baggage also worked into this link directly to the transit sheds on the dock. The junction was worked by a signal box provided in 1886 which was replaced in 1918. This signal box was taken out of use on 23 February 1961 and control was transferred to the new signal box at Tilbury Riverside. A Port of London Authority signal box controlled the exchange sidings area opening in 1886 and this was closed on 6 January 1968.

In April 1969 a new junction was provided west of the site making use of a disused Seabrooks Brewery Siding (controlled by Grays signal box) and an intermodal terminal opened in June 1969 which is still in operation in 2025.

Preceding station	National Rail	Following station
Grays	c2c London, Tilbury and Southend line Tilbury Loop	East Tilbury
	Disused railways	
Grays	Network SouthEast; London, Tilbury and Southend line	Tilbury Riverside
