= Ockendon railway station =

Network Rail station in Essex, England

Ockendon
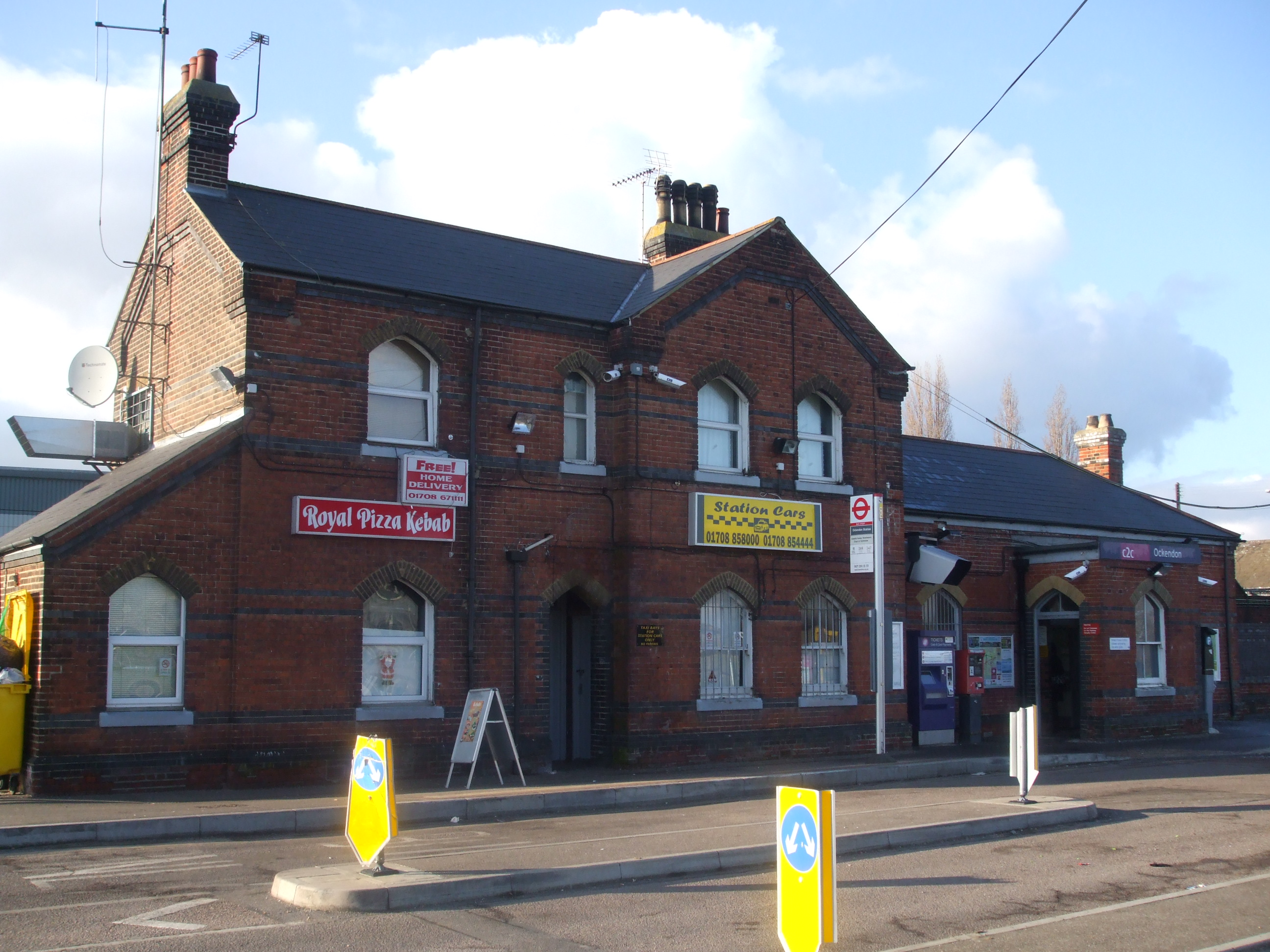
- Ockendon railway station in 2010
- Interactive map of Ockendon

General information
- Location: South Ockendon
- Local authority: Thurrock
- Managed by: c2c
- Owner: Network Rail
- Station code: OCK
- DfT category: E
- Number of platforms: 2
- Fare zone: A

National Rail annual entry and exit
- 2020–21: ▼0.459 million
- 2021–22: ▲0.797 million
- 2022–23: ▲0.901 million
- 2023–24: ▲0.996 million
- 2024–25: ▲1.028 million

Key dates
- 1 July 1892: Opened

Other information
- External links: Departures; Facilities
- Coordinates: 51.5216°N 0.2902°E

Ockendon is a railway station located on a passing loop on a single-track branch of the London, Tilbury and Southend line, serving the town of South Ockendon, Essex. It is 18 miles 44 chains (29.9 km) down the line from London Fenchurch Street via Upminster; the following station on the branch is Chafford Hundred. Its three-letter station code is OCK.

The station was opened in 1892 by the London, Tilbury and Southend Railway (LTSR). Today, all passenger train services are operated by c2c, which also manages the station. Although the station is outside the London fare zones 1 to 6, it became part of the Oyster card pay-as-you-go network in 2010.

== History ==
The single-track line through the area was opened in 1892 by the LTSR as part of a branch from Romford to Grays via Upminster. By the late 20th century, service on the line had been reduced to a relatively infrequent shuttle between Upminster and Grays. However, service levels increased following the opening of a new station on the branch at Chafford Hundred and the shuttle train service was eventually extended beyond Upminster to Fenchurch Street in London and beyond Grays to Southend Central in Southend-on-Sea.

== Services ==
The station has two platforms. As of the June 2024 timetable the typical Monday to Friday off-peak service is:

- 2 tph (trains per hour) westbound to London Fenchurch Street
- 2 tph eastbound to Southend Central

== Connections ==
NIBS Buses route 269 serves the station.

Preceding station	National Rail	Following station
Upminster	c2c London, Tilbury and Southend line via Ockendon	Chafford Hundred
