= Greater Anglia (2012–2025) =

Former British train operating company

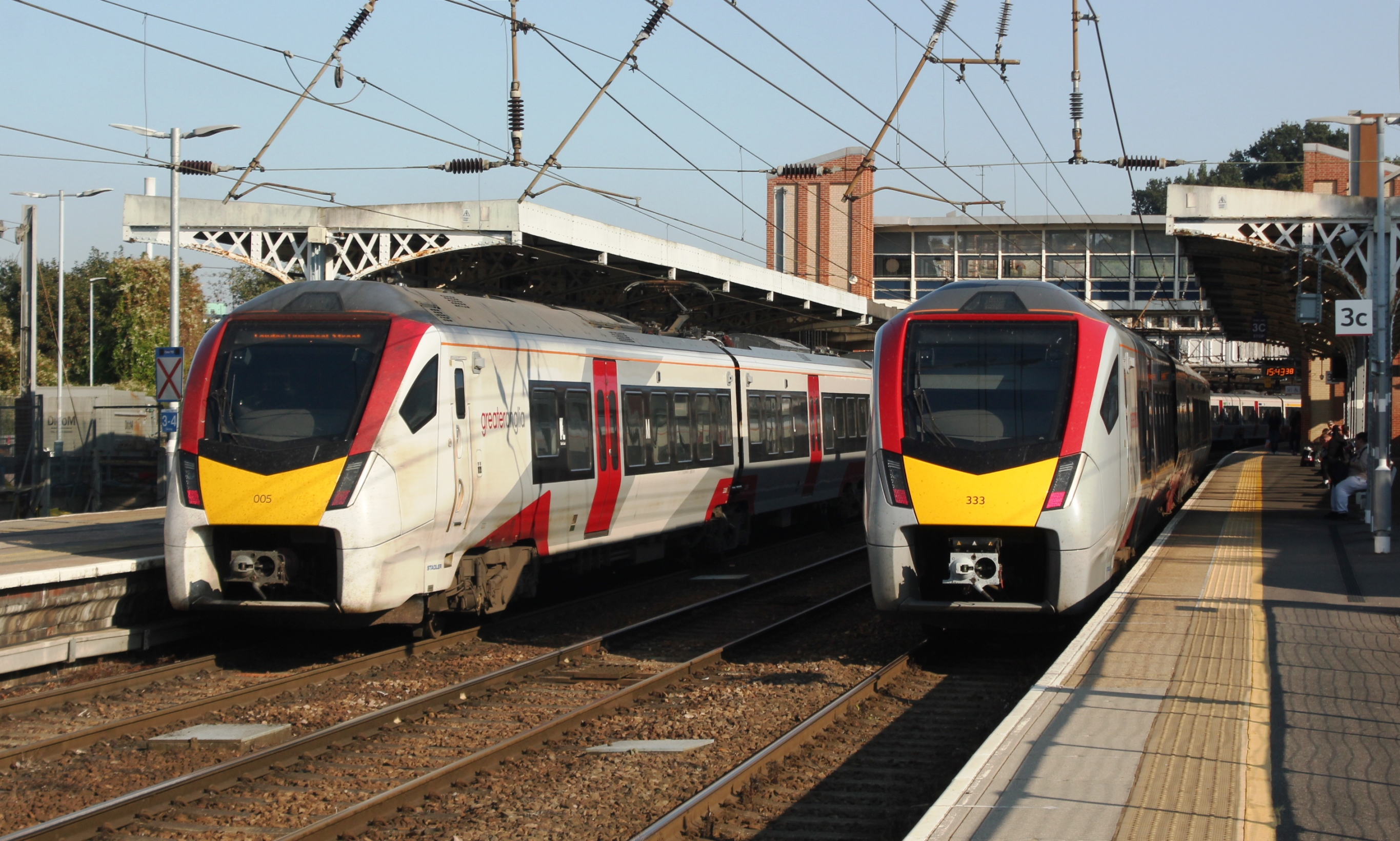
- Greater Anglia Class 745 and Class 755 units side by side at Ipswich

Overview
- Franchises: Greater Anglia (5 February 2012 – 15 October 2016); East Anglia (16 October 2016 – 12 October 2025)
- Main region: East of England
- Other region: Greater London
- Fleet: Class 720 Aventra; Class 745 FLIRT; Class 755 FLIRT
- Stations called at: 150
- Stations operated: 134
- Parent company: Transport UK Group (60%); Mitsui & Co (40%)
- Headquarters: London
- Reporting mark: LE
- Predecessor: National Express East Anglia
- Successor: Greater Anglia

Other
- Website: www.greateranglia.co.uk

Transport UK East Anglia Limited, trading as Greater Anglia and earlier as Abellio Greater Anglia, was a British train operating company owned as a joint venture by Transport UK Group and Mitsui & Co. It operated the East Anglia franchise, providing the commuter and inter-city services from its central London terminus at Liverpool Street station to Essex, Suffolk, Norfolk and parts of Hertfordshire and Cambridgeshire, as well as many regional services throughout the East of England.

Abellio began operating the franchise, then known as the Greater Anglia franchise, replacing the National Express franchise on 4 February 2012. Initially, it traded under the same name until it rebranded as Abellio Greater Anglia in December 2013. Shortly after taking over operations, the company initiated a series of projects to improve service levels, including the procurement of new trains and the launch of the Norwich in 90 programme to reduce travel times between several major locations on its network. In May 2015, Greater Anglia's suburban rail services were transferred to London Overground and the precursor to Crossrail, TfL Rail.

The franchise was retendered as the East Anglia franchise and was awarded to Abellio in August 2016. The company resumed trading as Greater Anglia on 16 October 2016 when the new franchise commenced. In January 2017, Abellio announced that subject to gaining Department for Transport (DfT) approval, it had agreed to sell a 40% stake in the business to Mitsui. Since the completion of the sale in March 2017, Greater Anglia has incorporated several Japanese planning tools and practices. Trade unions have objected to some of the changes made by the company, leading to industrial action in 2017 and 2018 as a result of the dispute.

In December 2024, it was announced that Greater Anglia's passenger services would be among the first to be brought into state ownership as part of the government's re-nationalisation plan, following South Western Railway and c2c. This took effect on 12 October 2025, when services were taken over by the new operator of the same name.

== History ==
=== Background ===
Abellio Greater Anglia logo as used from 2013 until 2016

In December 2003, the Strategic Rail Authority awarded the Greater Anglia franchise to National Express, which began operations on 1 April 2004, initially under the brand-name One. The franchise was to run until March 2011, with provision for a three-year extension if performance targets were met. In November 2009, the Department for Transport (DfT) announced that National Express would not be granted the three-year extension even though it had met the performance criteria, because National Express East Coast had defaulted on the InterCity East Coast franchise.

Following a change of government as a result of the 2010 general election, the DfT announced in June 2010 that all refranchising would be put on hold while a process review was conducted. As a result, National Express East Anglia was granted an initial extension until October 2011, followed by another until February 2012.

In March 2011, the DfT announced that Abellio, Go-Ahead, and Stagecoach had been shortlisted to bid for the franchise. In October 2011, the new franchise was awarded to Abellio; accordingly, the services previously operated by National Express East Anglia were transferred to Greater Anglia on 5 February 2012.

The Greater Anglia franchise was originally to run until July 2014; the reason for awarding a short franchise at a time when the government was speaking of its desire for longer franchises was to allow the government to digest the recommendations of the McNulty Rail Value for Money study before letting a long-term franchise. In March 2013, the Secretary of State for Transport announced the franchise would again be extended until 15 October 2016. Greater Anglia was rebranded as Abellio Greater Anglia in December 2013.

=== Changes ===
Prior to Greater Anglia, the last period of substantial investment in the region had been nearly 30 years earlier, specifically the electrification of the line north of Ipswich. At the commencement of the franchise, railway commentator Philip Haigh observed that the region's services had changed little since the BR days, and that change was overdue. During the negotiations for the award of the franchise, Greater Anglia pledged to undertake numerous investments that would improve the various services and facilities offered. On 4 November 2014, the Great Eastern Main Line Taskforce released its investment analysis report, which included a detailed breakdown of several proposed investments in the region's rail network.

One major initiative that was commenced by Greater Anglia shortly after it took over operations was the 'Norwich in 90' campaign, aimed at introducing faster journey times, such as between London and Colchester within 40 minutes, London and Ipswich in 60 minutes, and London and Norwich in 90 minutes. Several organisations, including Norfolk County Council, had been calling for such a scheme to be undertaken since as early as 2009. Abellio had acknowledged such calls in 2012, but could not justify making very substantial investments during the initial franchise period due to the short timescale involved. The creation of the Great Eastern Rail Taskforce in 2013 was seen as a major step towards this. In 2015, Chloe Smith, Norwich North MP and co-chairman of the taskforce, noted that the scheme was as much a political effort as it was an engineering one.

By the 2010s, the region's rail infrastructure was relatively worn-out and prone to unreliability. Modernisation efforts would therefore focus not only on improving absolute speeds but on reducing failure rates as well. This work is being undertaken as a multiagency effort, involving not only infrastructure changes carried out by Network Rail and various civil engineering companies, but also the procurement of new rolling stock and other efforts. It was recognised early on that, for the intercity services to be meaningfully sped up, slower regional trains could not feasibly be overtaken or avoided on the mostly twin-track line, so that services overall would need to be accelerated. There has also been an aspiration to increase the number of trains between Norwich and London to three per hour, although capacity constraints such as the single-track section in the vicinity of the Trowse Swing Bridge would need to be overcome to facilitate this.

Some services have been transferred from Greater Anglia's management to other rail operators. On 31 May 2015, the Liverpool Street to Enfield Town, Cheshunt (via Seven Sisters) and Chingford services, as well as the Romford to Upminster service, were transferred to London Overground Rail Operations. On the same day, the Liverpool Street to Shenfield stopping services were also transferred to the TfL Rail concession managed by MTR.

In June 2015, an Abellio (60%) / Stagecoach (40%) joint venture, FirstGroup and National Express were shortlisted to bid for the franchise. In December 2015, it was announced that Stagecoach had pulled out of the joint bid with Abellio, and that Abellio would continue the bid alone. In August 2016, it was announced that Abellio had successfully retained the franchise until 2025. One commitment of the new franchise period is the purchase of 1,043 new carriages, 660 from Bombardier Transportation's Derby Litchurch Lane Works with the remainder being built by Stadler Rail. In January 2017, Abellio announced that, subject to gaining DfT approval, it had agreed to sell a 40% stake in the business to Mitsui. The sale was completed in March 2017. Reportedly, Greater Anglia has incorporated numerous planning and operational practices of the Japanese railways, such as the use of digital twin simulation software for analysing performance and developing its timetables, since the acquisition.

In 2021, following the COVID-19 emergency measures, Greater Anglia was given a direct award contract, replacing its franchise agreement, expiring on 20 September 2026.

In February 2023, Transport UK Group concluded a management buyout of Abellio's United Kingdom business, which included its share in Greater Anglia.

=== Industrial action ===
In August 2017, amidst a background of ongoing rail strikes on a national level, Greater Anglia conductors voted in favour of going on strike in a dispute over planned ticket office closures and the planned introduction of more widespread driver-only operation on the Greater Anglia network. On numerous occasions since October 2017, industrial action has been taken by portions of the company's employees, and the principal matter of dispute has seen no effective resolution. The National Union of Rail, Maritime and Transport Workers (RMT) has accused Greater Anglia of conducting alleged strike-breaking tactics and claimed that its use of stand-in conductors led to passengers' safety being jeopardised. The dispute between Greater Anglia and the RMT continued into 2018, with further strikes threatened during the summer that affected around 40 per cent of the operator's services.

On 19 July 2018, the RMT announced members had voted 9 to 1 to accept a deal that would keep guards on trains, and halted the expansion of driver only operation.

Greater Anglia is one of several train operators impacted by the 2022–2024 United Kingdom railway strikes, which are the first national rail strikes in the UK for three decades. Its workers are amongst those who are participating in industrial action due to a dispute over pay and working conditions.

=== Termination ===
In the lead up to the 2024 United Kingdom general election, the Labour Party led by Keir Starmer committed itself to bring the passenger operations of the British rail network back under state ownership. Following its election in 2024, the government passed the Passenger Railway Services (Public Ownership) Act 2024.

In December 2024, it was announced that Greater Anglia's National Rail Contract would be terminated in late-2025 after the DfT activates a break clause, with the state-owned Greater Anglia to take over its passenger services. In May 2025, the date was confirmed as 12 October 2025.

== Franchise commitments ==
=== Greater Anglia franchise (2012–2016) ===
A number of improvements were planned during the first franchise period (2012–2016) which included:

- Improved station and ticket facilities and better information for passengers;
- A text messaging service to keep passengers informed of any disruptions;
- Extending Oyster card pay-as-you-go capabilities between London Liverpool Street and Shenfield / Hertford East;
- Mobile-phone and print-at-home ticketing facilities;
- 600 extra car park spaces at stations;
- Additional bicycle storage facilities;
- New automatic ticket barriers at Brentwood (no automatic ticket barrier was installed by Abellio Greater Anglia and management of the station later passed to TfL Rail).

=== East Anglia franchise (2016–2025) ===
The following improvements were planned as part of the Abellio bid for the East Anglia franchise (2016–2025):

- Replacement of the entire current fleet, with 1,043 new vehicles by September 2020 to run on the Regional, Intercity, Dutchflyer, Stansted Express, West Anglia and Great Eastern routes:
- Extensive refurbishment of some of the existing vehicles, prior to replacement;
- Raise Public Performance Measure scores to at least 92.9%;
- Two weekday trains operating between Norwich and Ipswich to London with a journey time of 90 min and 60 min respectively;
- Free Wi-Fi on trains and stations;
- £60 million investment for station upgrades, with a focus on Broxbourne, Cambridge, Cheshunt, Harlow Town and Southend Victoria stations;
- Introduction of digital information screens on all stations, with improvements in car and cycle parking (1,800 and 4,000 extra spaces respectively) along with upgrades to ticket offices and vending machines;
- New ticketing programmes, with offers for infrequent travellers and part-time workers;
- Introduction of an automatic Delay Repay service for season and advance ticket holders;
- £120 million of investment into depots with a new maintenance facility at Manningtree;
- Hiring of twenty trainees per year and creation of at least thirty apprenticeships by 2019;
- Extension of the Gainsborough Line from Marks Tey to Colchester Town;
- Reintroduction of four direct Lowestoft to London services on the East Suffolk Line;
- Improving the frequency of the Ipswich to Ely Line services to Peterborough from every two hours to hourly with some additional services extending to Colchester;
- Improving the frequency of the Ipswich to Cambridge Line and East Suffolk Line services from every two hours to hourly respectively on Sundays.

== Services ==
As of October 2025, when its contract ended, Greater Anglia operated the following services operate during the off-peak period, Monday to Friday:

=== Inter-City ===
| Route | tph | Calling at |
|---|---|---|
| London Liverpool Street – Norwich | 2 | Stratford (Note: Pick up only northbound, set down only southbound) (1tph), Chelmsford (1tph), Colchester, Manningtree, Ipswich, Stowmarket (1tph), Diss; Services call at either Chelmsford, or Stratford and Stowmarket. |

=== Great Eastern ===
Great Eastern Main Line
| Route | tph | Calling at |
|---|---|---|
| London Liverpool Street – Ipswich | 1 | Stratford, Shenfield, Chelmsford, Beaulieu Park, Hatfield Peverel, Witham, Kelvedon, Marks Tey, Colchester, Manningtree |
Shenfield–Southend and Crouch Valley lines
| Route | tph | Calling at |
| London Liverpool Street – Southend Victoria | 3 | Stratford, Romford (2tph), Shenfield, Billericay, Wickford, Rayleigh, Hockley, Rochford, Southend Airport, Prittlewell |
| Wickford – Southminster | 3/2 | Battlesbridge, South Woodham Ferrers, North Fambridge, Althorne, Burnham-on-Crouch |
Braintree branch line
| Route | tph | Calling at |
| London Liverpool Street – Braintree | 1 | Stratford, Shenfield, Ingatestone, Chelmsford, Witham, White Notley, Cressing, Braintree Freeport |
Gainsborough line
| Route | tph | Calling at |
| Marks Tey – Sudbury | 1 | Chappel & Wakes Colne, Bures |
Sunshine Coast Line
| Route | tph | Calling at |
| London Liverpool Street – Colchester Town | 1 | Stratford, Shenfield, Chelmsford, Beaulieu Park, Witham, Kelvedon, Marks Tey, Colchester |
| London Liverpool Street – Clacton-on-Sea | 1 | Stratford, Shenfield, Ingatestone, Chelmsford, Witham, Colchester, Hythe, Wivenhoe, Thorpe-le-Soken |
| Colchester – Colchester Town | 1 | Shuttle service |
| Colchester – Walton-on-the-Naze | 1 | Colchester Town, (Note: Trains reverse) Hythe, Wivenhoe, Alresford, Great Bentley, Weeley, Thorpe-le-Soken, Kirby Cross, Frinton-on-Sea |
Mayflower line
| Route | tph | Calling at |
| Manningtree – Harwich Town | 1 | Mistley, Wrabness, Harwich International, Dovercourt; Services in partnership with Stena's Dutchflyer service. Additional irregular services to Harwich through Dutchflyer are provided from London Liverpool Street, Cambridge, and Lowestoft. |

=== West Anglia ===
West Anglia Main Line
| Route | tph | Calling at |
|---|---|---|
| Stratford – Meridian Water | 2 | Lea Bridge, Tottenham Hale, Northumberland Park |
| Stratford – Bishop's Stortford | 2 | Lea Bridge, Tottenham Hale, Northumberland Park (1tph), Enfield Lock (1tph), Waltham Cross (1tph), Cheshunt, Broxbourne, Roydon (1tph), Harlow Town, Harlow Mill (1tph), Sawbridgeworth; Trains alternate between serving Waltham Cross, or Northumberland Park, Enfield Lock, Roydon, and Harlow Mill. |
Hertford East branch line
| Route | tph | Calling at |
| London Liverpool Street – Hertford East | 2 | Hackney Downs, Tottenham Hale, Ponders End, Brimsdown, Enfield Lock, Waltham Cross, Cheshunt, Broxbourne, Rye House, St Margarets, Ware |
London to Cambridge and Ely
| Route | tph | Calling at |
| London Liverpool Street – Cambridge North | 2 | Tottenham Hale, Cheshunt, Broxbourne, Roydon (1tph), Harlow Town, Harlow Mill (1tph), Sawbridgeworth (1tph), Bishop's Stortford, Stansted Mountfitchet (1tph), Elsenham (1tph), Newport (1tph), Audley End, Great Chesterford (1tph), Whittlesford Parkway, Shelford (1tph), Cambridge; Roydon, Harlow Mill, Sawbridgeworth, Stansted Mountfitchet, Elsenham, Newport, Great Chesterford, and Shelford are all served by the same trains. |
| London Liverpool Street - Ely | 4tpd | Tottenham Hale, Cheshunt (1tpd), Broxbourne, Roydon (1tpd), Harlow Town (1tpd), Harlow Mill (1tpd), Sawbridgeworth (1tpd), Bishop's Stortford, Stansted Mountfitchet (1tpd), Elsenham (2tpd), Newport (2tpd), Audley End, Great Chesterford (2tpd), Whittlesford Parkway, Shelford (2tpd), Cambridge, Cambridge North (2tpd), Waterbeach: Monday – Friday only |

=== Regional ===
Felixstowe branch line
| Route | tph | Calling at |
|---|---|---|
| Ipswich – Felixstowe | 1 | Westerfield, Derby Road, Trimley |
East Suffolk line
| Route | tph | Calling at |
| Ipswich – Lowestoft | 1 | Woodbridge, Melton, Wickham Market, Saxmundham, Darsham, Halesworth, Brampton, Beccles, Oulton Broad South |
Ipswich–Ely line
| Route | tph | Calling at |
| Ipswich – Cambridge | 1 | Needham Market, Stowmarket, Elmswell, Thurston, Bury St Edmunds, Kennett (1tp2h), Newmarket, Dullingham (1tp2h); Kennett and Dullingham are served by alternate trains. |
| Ipswich – Peterborough | 1/2 | Stowmarket, Bury St Edmunds, Soham, Ely, Manea, March, Whittlesea |
Bittern Line
| Route | tph | Calling at |
| Norwich – Sheringham | 1 | Salhouse (1tp2h), Hoveton & Wroxham, Worstead (1tp2h), North Walsham, Gunton (1tp2h), Roughton Road (1tp2h), Cromer, West Runton; Trains alternate between serving Worstead, or Salhouse, Gunton, and Roughton Road together. |
Wherry Lines
| Route | tph | Calling at |
| Norwich – Great Yarmouth | 1 | Brundall Gardens, Brundall, Lingwood, Acle; Does not run when the service via Berney Arms below runs instead |
| Norwich – Great Yarmouth | 2tpd | Brundall Gardens (1tpd), Brundall, Cantley, Reedham, Berney Arms |
| Norwich – Lowestoft | 1 | Brundall (1tp2h), Buckenham (1tpd), Cantley (1tp2h), Reedham (1tp2h), Haddiscoe (1tp2h), Somerleyton (1tp2h), Oulton Broad North; Trains alternate between stoppers or only calling at Oulton Broad North |
Breckland line
| Route | tph | Calling at |
| Norwich – Stansted Airport | 1 | Wymondham, Spooner Row (2tpd), Attleborough, Eccles Road (2tpd), Harling Road (2tpd), Thetford, Brandon, Shippea Hill (1tpd), Ely, Cambridge North, Cambridge, Whittlesford Parkway, Audley End |

=== Stansted Express ===
Greater Anglia operates the Stansted Express sub-branded airport rail link between Stansted Airport and London Liverpool Street. As of May 2025, Stansted Express' off-peak services Monday to Friday are:

| Route | tph | Calling at |
|---|---|---|
| London Liverpool Street - Stansted Airport | 4 | Tottenham Hale, Harlow Town (2tph), Bishop's Stortford (2tph), Stansted Mountfitchet (1tph); Services alternate between Harlow Town and Bishop's Stortford; with Stansted Mountfitchet being served by Harlow Town services. |

== Performance ==
Punctuality statistics released by Network Rail for service report period 7 of 2013–2014 (15 September – 13 October 2013) were 94.0% PPM (Public Performance Measure), down 1.0 percentage point on the same period ine the previous year, and the MAA (Moving Annual Average) up to 12 October 2013 also fell slightly to 92.3%. In 2013, Abellio Greater Anglia was named train operator of the year. However, a survey in February 2014 by the consumer group Which? found that customer satisfaction with Abellio Greater Anglia was at last place (out of 20 train operators) with a satisfaction percentage of 40%, and in 2016 Abellio Greater Anglia was rated the fourth worst UK train operator with a commuter rail services satisfaction rating of 35%.

Forecasts issued during the mid-2010s predicted that demand on the GEML into London from Suffolk and Norfolk was expected to grow by 32 per cent, while demand from Essex was to go up by 52 per cent. This prediction was in spite of the relatively low levels of subsidies provided for Greater Anglia's operations, and the general lack of improvements in prior years; according to industry periodical Rail, it was the second least subsidised passenger operator by 2015.

== Rolling stock ==
Greater Anglia inherited a fleet of Class 90, Mark 3 carriages and Driving Van Trailers; Class 153, Class 156 and Class 170 diesel multiple units; and Class 315, Class 317, Class 321, Class 360 and Class 379 electric multiple units from National Express East Anglia. Due to its short initial franchise term, Greater Anglia was not planning to introduce any new trains, although this policy changed substantially following the start of its second franchise term in October 2016.

In November 2013, an online petition was launched, aimed at stopping Greater Anglia's trains from dumping raw sewage from the train toilets directly onto the tracks. There were also concerns with the 'sewage mist' from passing trains making Network Rail staff ill; Greater Anglia announced it was "working closely" with the government to introduce a fleet upgrade. By October 2016, all the franchise's Mark 3 carriages and Class 156 multiple units had been refitted with controlled emission toilets.

On 31 May 2015, the company's fleet of Class 315 trains were cascaded to London Overground and TfL Rail; in addition, some Class 317 trains were cascaded to London Overground, which took over local services in North and East London from the Greater Anglia franchise.

In August 2016, it was announced that 1,043 new carriages would be purchased, which would allow for all of the ageing stock to be replaced. This was especially necessary given that a number of coaches were not compliant with accessibility requirements beyond 2020 and they would not be able to meet Abellio's new targets for lower journey times without extensive modification. One part of the contract went to Bombardier with nearly £1 billion to build 111 Bombardier Aventra electric multiple units and the other part of the purchase went to Stadler to build 58 FLIRT electric multiple units, all of which would enter service between August 2019 and September 2020.

Bombardier's order included all 111 Class 720 units for taking over local and commuter services out of Liverpool Street. Stadler's order included 20 twelve-carriage Class 745 units to operate inter-city services on the Great Eastern Main Line and the Stansted Express as well as 38 three- and four-carriage Class 755 units for taking over all local diesel services from the previous outdated rolling stock. By July 2020, all Class 755 trains had entered passenger service.

The first unit of the new order to enter service was from the Class 755 fleet, of which the first entered service on 29 July 2019 on the Norwich to Great Yarmouth and Lowestoft route. The next of the order was the Class 745/0 fleet, of which the first entered service on 8 January 2020 on the Great Eastern Main Line operating services between Norwich and Liverpool Street. Following the introduction of these units, the Class 90 hauled sets were all withdrawn from service, with the last set running its last journeys on 24 March 2020.

In March 2020, testing of the new Class 720 fleet finally began and continued despite the ongoing COVID-19 pandemic, in order to allow the first unit to enter service within the next few months. In June 2020, the units were authorised to enter passenger service and, after further testing and crew training, the first two units finally entered service on 26 November 2020 as a pairing on the Shenfield to Southend Line.

Class 360 units began moving to Kings Heath TMD in Northampton in June 2020 for modifications by Siemens to make them capable of 110 mph (180 km/h) speeds, in preparation for their transfer to East Midlands Railway (EMR). Due to delays in commissioning the Class 720s and to allow the Class 360s to be released, three Class 321/9s and five Class 322s, last used by Northern Trains, were leased from July 2020. The first unit bound for EMR, 360120, moved to Cricklewood depot on 10 November 2020, with all having transferred by February 2021.

Due to high leasing costs, the fleet of 30 Class 379 Electrostar EMUs was withdrawn and sent to storage in February 2022.

On 1 August 2022, Greater Anglia confirmed that all West Anglia services were now operated by Class 720 Aventra units.

Greater Anglia withdrew its Class 321 fleet at the end of April 2023.

=== Final fleet ===
At the time its contract ended in October 2025, Greater Anglia operated the following rolling stock:

| Family | Class | Image | Type | Top speed | | Number | Carriages | Routes operated | Built |
| Family | Class | Image | Type | mph | km/h | Number | Carriages | Routes operated | Built |
Shunting locomotive
| | 08 | N/A | Shunter | 15 | 24 | 3 | N/A | Stock movements | 1952–1962 |
Electric multiple units
| Bombardier Aventra | 720/1 | | EMU | 100 | 161 | 44 | 5 | London to Cambridge North and Ely; Hertford East branch line; West Anglia Main Line; Braintree branch line; Crouch Valley line; Dutchflyer; Great Eastern Main Line; Shenfield–Southend line; Sunshine Coast Line; Stansted Express (Some services) | 2018–2021 |
| Bombardier Aventra | 720/5 | | EMU | 100 | 161 | 89 | 5 | London to Cambridge North and Ely; Hertford East branch line; West Anglia Main Line; Braintree branch line; Crouch Valley line; Dutchflyer; Great Eastern Main Line; Shenfield–Southend line; Sunshine Coast Line; Stansted Express (Some services) | 2018–2021 |
| Stadler FLIRT | 745/0 | | EMU | 100 | 161 | 10 | 12 | Great Eastern Main Line | 2018-2020 |
| Stadler FLIRT | 745/1 | | EMU | 100 | 161 | 10 | 12 | Stansted Express | 2018-2020 |
Bi-mode multiple units
| Stadler FLIRT | 755/3; 755/4 | | BMU | 100 | 161 | 14 | 3 | Wherry Lines; Breckland line; Bittern Line; East Suffolk line; Great Eastern Main Line; West Anglia Main Line; Felixstowe branch line; Ipswich–Ely line; Gainsborough line | 2018–2020 |
| Stadler FLIRT | 755/3; 755/4 | | BMU | 100 | 161 | 24 | 4 | Wherry Lines; Breckland line; Bittern Line; East Suffolk line; Great Eastern Main Line; West Anglia Main Line; Felixstowe branch line; Ipswich–Ely line; Gainsborough line | 2018–2020 |

=== Past fleet ===
Former train types operated by Greater Anglia include:

| Family | Class | Image | Type | Top speed | | Cars | Number | Built | Routes operated |
| Family | Class | Image | Type | mph | km/h | Cars | Number | Built | Routes operated |
Locomotive hauled stock
| | 37 | | Diesel locomotive | 80 | 130 | N/A | 4 | 1960–1965 | Wherry Lines |
| Stadler UKLight | 68 | | Diesel locomotive | 100 | 161 | N/A | 3 | 2013–2017 | Wherry Lines |
| | Mark 2 | | Carriage | 100 | 161 | N/A | 13 | 1963–1975 | Wherry Lines |
| | 90 | | Electric locomotive | 110 | 177 | 9 | 15 | 1987–1990 | Great Eastern Main Line |
| | Mark 3 | | Carriage | 125 | 201 | 9 | 130 | 1975–1988 | Great Eastern Main Line |
| | Driving Van Trailer | | Control car | 125 | 201 | 9 | 15 | 1988–1990 | Great Eastern Main Line |
Diesel multiple units
| Super Sprinter | 153 | | DMU | 75 | 121 | 1 | 5 | 1991–1992 | Wherry Lines; Breckland line; Bittern Line; East Suffolk line; Felixstowe branch line; Ipswich–Ely line; Gainsborough line |
| Super Sprinter | 156 | | DMU | 75 | 121 | 2 | 9 | 1987–1988 | Wherry Lines; Breckland line; Bittern Line; East Suffolk line; Felixstowe branch line; Ipswich–Ely line; Gainsborough line |
| Bombardier Turbostar | 170/2 | | DMU | 100 | 161 | 2 | 4 | 2002 | Wherry Lines; Breckland line; Bittern Line; East Suffolk line; Felixstowe branch line; Ipswich–Ely line; Gainsborough line |
| Bombardier Turbostar | 170/2 | | DMU | 100 | 161 | 3 | 8 | 1999 | Wherry Lines; Breckland line; Bittern Line; East Suffolk line; Felixstowe branch line; Ipswich–Ely line; Gainsborough line |
Electric multiple units
| BREL 1972 | 315 | | EMU | 75 | 121 | 4 | 61 | 1980–1981 | Shenfield Metro; Lea Valley lines; Romford–Upminster line |
| BR Second Generation (Mark 3) | 317/1 | | EMU | 100 | 161 | 4 | 10 | 1981–1982 | London to Cambridge North and Ely; Hertford East branch line; West Anglia Main Line |
| BR Second Generation (Mark 3) | 317/5 | | EMU | 100 | 161 | 4 | 7 | 1981–1982 | London to Cambridge North and Ely; Hertford East branch line; West Anglia Main Line |
| BR Second Generation (Mark 3) | 317/6 | | EMU | 100 | 161 | 4 | 24 | 1985–1987 | London to Cambridge North and Ely; Hertford East branch line; West Anglia Main Line |
| BR Second Generation (Mark 3) | 317/7 | | EMU | 100 | 161 | 4 | 9 | 1981–1982 | Lea Valley lines |
| BR Second Generation (Mark 3) | 317/8 | | EMU | 100 | 161 | 4 | 9 | 1981–1982 | Lea Valley lines |
| BR Second Generation (Mark 3) | 321 | | EMU | 100 | 161 | 4 | 89 | 1988–1991 | Braintree branch line; Crouch Valley line; Dutchflyer; Great Eastern Main Line; Mayflower line; Shenfield–Southend line; Sunshine Coast Line |
| BR Second Generation (Mark 3) | 322 | | EMU | 100 | 161 | 4 | 5 | 1990 | Braintree branch line; Crouch Valley line; Dutchflyer; Great Eastern Main Line; Mayflower line; Shenfield–Southend line; Sunshine Coast Line |
| Siemens Desiro | 360/1 | | EMU | 110 | 177 | 4 | 21 | 2002–2003 | Braintree branch line; Dutchflyer; Great Eastern Main Line; Mayflower line; Sunshine Coast Line |
| Bombardier Electrostar | 379 | | EMU | 100 | 160 | 4 | 30 | 2010–2011 | London to Cambridge North and Ely; Stansted Express; West Anglia Main Line |

== Depots ==
Greater Anglia's fleet was maintained at the Clacton Servicing Depot, Ilford EMU Depot and Crown Point TMD.

| Preceded by National Express East Anglia | Operator of Greater Anglia franchise 2012–2016 | Succeeded by Greater Anglia; East Anglia franchise |
| Preceded by Abellio Greater Anglia; Greater Anglia franchise | Operator of East Anglia franchise 2016 – 2026 | Succeeded by Greater Anglia |
