= Billericay railway station =

Railway station in Essex, England

Coordinates: 51.629°N 0.419°E

Billericay
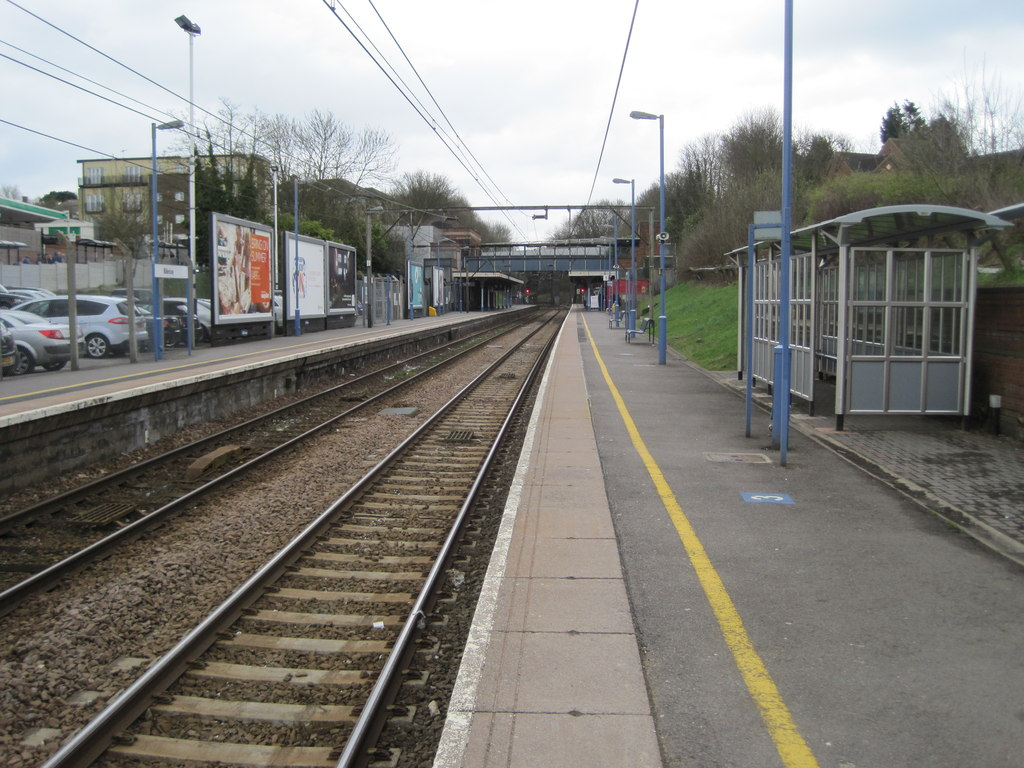
- Eastbound view from platform 1 (April 2013)

General information
- Location: Billericay, Borough of Basildon, England
- Grid reference: TQ674949
- Managed by: Greater Anglia
- Platforms: 2

Other information
- Station code: BIC
- Classification: DfT category C2

History
- Opened: 1 January 1889

Passengers
- 2020/21: ▼0.506 million
- 2021/22: ▲1.446 million
- 2022/23: ▲1.887 million
- 2023/24: ▲2.194 million
- 2024/25: ▲2.349 million
Location
Notes
- Passenger statistics from the Office of Rail and Road

Billericay railway station serves the town of Billericay, in Essex, England. It lies 24 miles 28 chains (39.19 km) east of London Liverpool Street, on the Shenfield to Southend Line between Shenfield and Wickford. The vast majority of services link Southend Victoria with Liverpool Street, joining the Great Eastern Main Line at Shenfield. The station and all trains serving it are operated by Greater Anglia.

== History ==
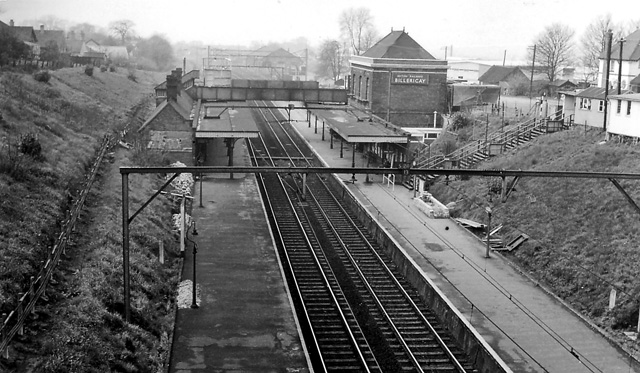
Billericay station in 1961

The line from Shenfield to Wickford, together with Billericay station, was opened for goods on 19 November 1888 and for passengers on 1 January 1889 by the Great Eastern Railway.^{[1]}

There was a goods yard on the 'down' (eastbound) side of the running lines to the north-west of the station, including a goods shed, cattle pens and a crane. There was a signal box on the 'up' side to the north-west of the station. Goods traffic ceased on 15 June 1967 and the goods shed was demolished soon after. The Shenfield to Southend Victoria line was originally electrified using overhead lines at 1.5 kV DC on 31 December 1956; this was changed to 6.25 kV AC in November 1960 and to 25 kV AC on 25 January 1979.

There were two sidings at Ramsden Bellhouse, 2.8 miles (4.5 km) east of Billericay station on the north side of the line; they were closed on 22 August 1960.

As part of the National Station Improvements scheme, the station underwent works costing around £1.4 million, which were completed in January 2012. These changes have completely altered the aspect of the station from the road side. A less-changed 'twin' of Billericay station is Buckhurst Hill tube station, another Great Eastern Railway station, which was built in 1892.

== Facilities ==
The booking hall is staffed between 06:00 and 20:15, with 07:10-20:40 on Sundays. There are lifts and stairs to the two platforms; ramps are also available for wheelchair users. It has a long line public address system providing automated announcements and digital information displays to offer train running details. There are bicycle racks and a 382-space car park.

== Services ==
Greater Anglia operates the following typical off-peak service in trains per hour (tph):

- 3tph to London Liverpool Street
- 3tph to Southend Victoria.

There are additional services at peak times, including some between Liverpool Street and Southminster which switch on to the Crouch Valley Line, via a junction at Wickford.

Preceding station	National Rail	Following station
Shenfield	Greater Anglia; Shenfield–Southend line	Wickford
