= South Woodham Ferrers railway station =

Railway station in Essex, England

Coordinates: 51.650°N 0.607°E

South Woodham Ferrers
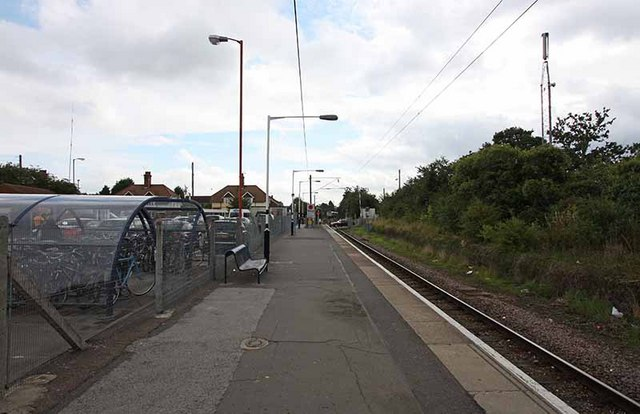

General information
- Location: South Woodham Ferrers, Chelmsford; England
- Grid reference: TQ804977
- Managed by: Greater Anglia
- Platforms: 1

Other information
- Station code: SOF
- Classification: DfT category C2

Key dates
- 1 July 1889: Opened as Woodham Ferris
- 1 October 1913: Renamed Woodham Ferrers
- 20 May 2007: Renamed South Woodham Ferrers

Passengers
- 2020/21: ▼71,784
- 2021/22: ▲0.238 million
- 2022/23: ▲0.251 million
- 2023/24: ▲0.289 million
- 2024/25: ▲0.318 million
Location
Notes
- Passenger statistics from the Office of Rail and Road

South Woodham Ferrers railway station is a stop on the Crouch Valley Line in the East of England, serving the town of South Woodham Ferrers, Essex. It is 34 miles (55 km) down the line from London Liverpool Street and is situated between Battlesbridge to the west and North Fambridge to the east. Train services are operated by Greater Anglia.

== History ==
The line and station were opened on 1 June 1889 for goods and on 1 July 1889 for passenger services by the Great Eastern Railway. The station was originally named Woodham Ferris; this was changed to Woodham Ferrers on 1 October 1913 and then to South Woodham Ferrers on 20 May 2007.

The station had two platforms connected by a footbridge, a goods yard and a 36-lever signal box; the goods yard closed in 1964. The south platform, goods loop, footbridge and signal box were decommissioned on 21 January 1967. The level crossing immediately to the east of the station was converted to automatic-opening on 9 March 1986 and to automatic half-barriers on 4 April 1993.

Electrification of the Wickford to Southminster line, using 25 kV overhead line electrification, was completed on 12 May 1986.

South Woodham Ferrers was also once a junction for a former branch line to Maldon West, which closed in 1953. The branch to Maldon left the Southminster branch at 34 miles 11 chains (54.94 km) (from Liverpool Street) and ran to 42 miles 40 chains (68.40 km). The Engineer's Line Reference for the former Maldon branch is WFM (Woodham Ferrers-Maldon). When the station was opened in 1889 by the Great Eastern Railway, it was intended to serve the nearby village of Woodham Ferrers, despite being located a few miles to the south. However, with subsequent development of the surrounding area into the new, and much larger, town of South Woodham Ferrers, the station now serves both.

== Services ==
All services at South Woodham Ferrers are operated by Greater Anglia using Class 720 electric multiple units.

The typical off-peak service is one train every 40 minutes in each direction between Wickford and Southminster. During peak hours, some services continue beyond Wickford to and from Shenfield and London Liverpool Street. On Sundays, the service is reduced to hourly in each direction.

| Preceding station | National Rail | Following station |
|---|---|---|
| Battlesbridge | Greater Anglia Crouch Valley Line | North Fambridge |
| | Disused railways | |
| Stow St Mary Halt | Great Eastern Railway Maldon West to Woodham Ferrers | Terminus |
