= North Fambridge railway station =

Railway station in Essex, England

Coordinates: 51.649°N 0.682°E

North Fambridge
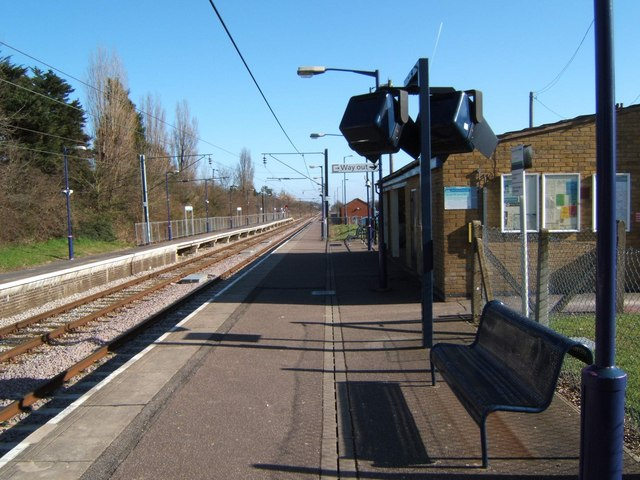

General information
- Location: North Fambridge, Maldon; England
- Grid reference: TQ856978
- Managed by: Greater Anglia
- Platforms: 2

Other information
- Station code: NFA
- Classification: DfT category F2

Key dates
- 1 July 1889: Opened as Fambridge
- 20 May 2007: Renamed North Fambridge

Passengers
- 2020/21: ▼9,096
- 2021/22: ▲36,830
- 2022/23: ▲47,690
- 2023/24: ▲60,434
- 2024/25: ▲69,574
Location
Notes
- Passenger statistics from the Office of Rail and Road

North Fambridge railway station is on the Crouch Valley Line in the East of England, serving the village of North Fambridge, Essex. It is 37 miles 27 chains (60.09 km) down the line from London Liverpool Street and is situated between South Woodham Ferrers to the west and Althorne to the east. Train services are operated by Greater Anglia.

== History ==
The line and station were opened for goods on 1 June 1889 and to passenger services on 1 July 1889 by the Great Eastern Railway. Facilities then included two platforms, both provided with buildings and linked by a footbridge; a goods yard including cattle pens; and a 30-lever signal box, reduced to ten after 1966. The signal box was taken out of use on 1 December 1985 and demolished in February 1986.

The original footbridge was replaced with a higher one prior to the overhead line electrification of the line, using 25 kV, in 1986.

As North Fambridge is at the midpoint of this single-tracked line, its double-tracked configuration provides a passing loop to allow two trains to run on the line at any one time. The station was originally called Fambridge, with the code FAM, but this was changed to North Fambridge on 20 May 2007.

== Services ==
All services at North Fambridge are operated by Greater Anglia using Class 720 electric multiple units.

The typical off-peak service is one train every 40 minutes in each direction between Wickford and Southminster. During peak hours, some services continue beyond Wickford to and from Shenfield and London Liverpool Street. On Sundays, the service is reduced to hourly in each direction.

Preceding station	National Rail	Following station
South Woodham Ferrers	Greater Anglia Crouch Valley Line	Althorne
