= Burnham-on-Crouch =

Town in south-east Essex, England

Coordinates: 51.6284°N 0.8145°E

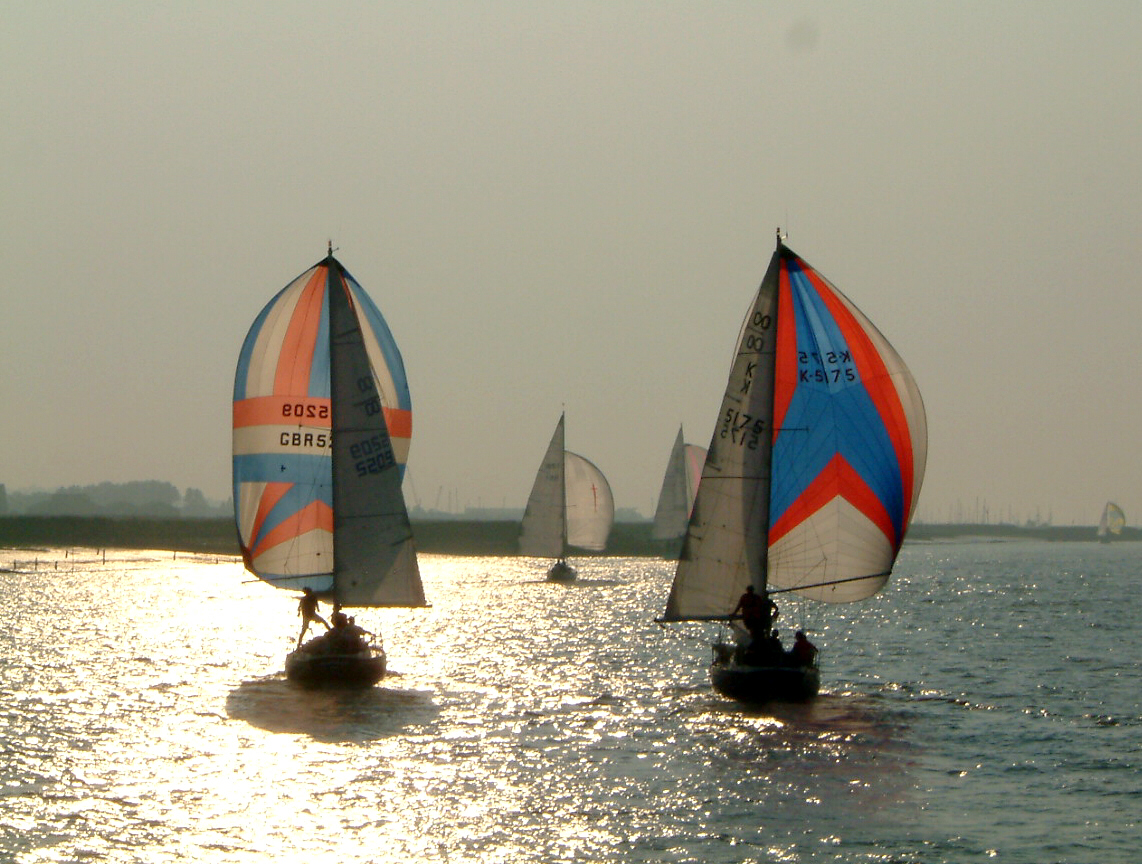
- Yacht racing under spinnakers on the River Crouch, Burnham-on-Crouch

- Location within Essex
- Population: 8,852 (Parish, 2021); 7,805 (Built up area, 2021)
- OS grid reference: TQ948959
- Civil parish: Burnham-on-Crouch
- District: Maldon
- Shire county: Essex
- Region: East
- Country: England
- Sovereign state: United Kingdom
- Post town: Burnham-on-Crouch
- Postcode district: CM0
- Dialling code: 01621
- Police: Essex
- Fire: Essex
- Ambulance: East of England
- UK Parliament: Maldon

Burnham-on-Crouch is a town and civil parish in the Maldon District of Essex, in the East of England; it lies on the north bank of the River Crouch. It is one of Britain's leading places for yachting.

The civil parish extends 5 miles (8 km) east of the town to the mouth of the River Crouch. It includes the hamlets of Creeksea and Ostend west of the town; Stoneyhills to the north; and Dammer Wick, West Wick and East Wick east of the town. At the 2021 census the parish had a population of 8,852 and the Burnham-on-Crouch built up area had a population of 7,805.

== History ==
The name Burnham derives from the Old English burnahām meaning 'settlement by a stream'.

According to the Domesday Book of 1086, Burnham was held in 1066 by a thegn called Alward and 10 free men. After 1066 it was acquired by a Norman called Tedric Pointel of Coggeshall whose overlord was Ralph Baynard. Historically, it has benefited from its location on the coast – first as a ferry port, later as a fishing port known for its oyster beds, and most recently as a centre for yachting.

The parish church of St Mary's Church, Burnham on Crouch is a large medieval church dedicated to St Mary the Virgin. The church is first recorded in 1155, when it was given to Little Dunmow Priory, and the Purbeck marble font dates from the twelfth century. The church's unusual plaster barrel vault dates from 1775, after the previous roof was destroyed by fire in 1774.

There is also a United Reformed Church in Station Road in Burnham-on-Crouch. It was built in 1950 as the Congregational Church after its predecessor burnt down in 1946. The URC Church was formed when the Congregational church merged with the local Methodist church in 1984. Also on Station Road is the Baptist Church.

There are many listed buildings in the town, including the Grade II* listed Royal Corinthian Yacht Club designed in 1931 by the modernist architect Joseph Emberton. The Mangapps Railway Museum is located nearby.

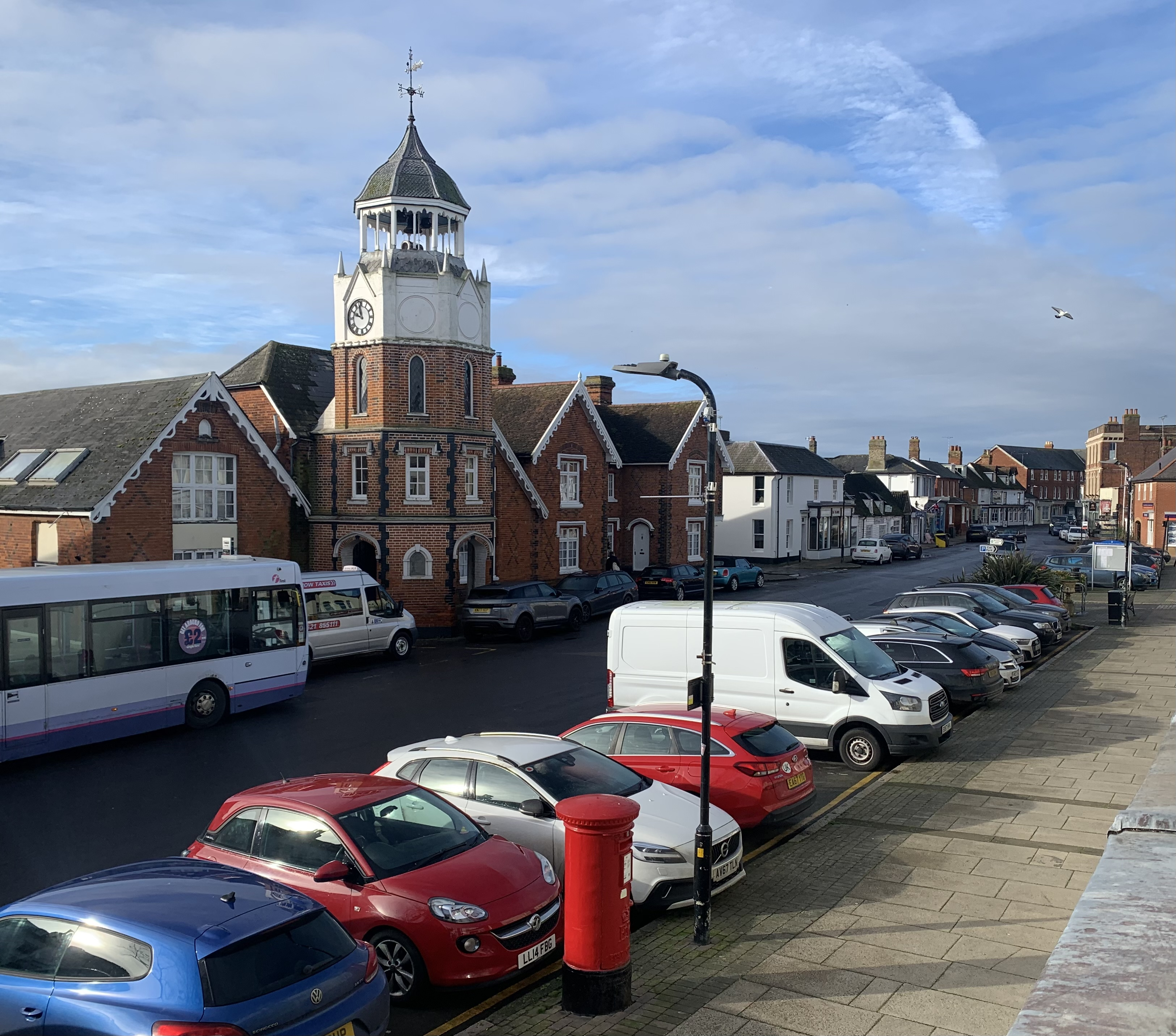
The town's high street, 2024

Although the town has a population of little over 7,500, it is the principal settlement in the wider Dengie peninsula area (population 20,000), meaning it has facilities that are uncommon in small towns, such as a cinema, a laundrette, a post office, 22 licensed drinking establishments and three pharmacies.

Burnham played a significant role in both world wars. A First World War airfield was established in 1915 on agricultural land next to present-day Wick Farm. It was used until early 1919. It was established for use by Home Defence aircraft in order to defend against Zeppelin attack and as a night flight station. The small grass landing field covered an area of about 150 acres. There were no permanent buildings, and the personnel were billeted in tented accommodation. The base was initially established by the Royal Navy Air Service (RNAS) and two Bristol T.B.8s operated from there. The Royal Flying Corps (RFC) took over responsibilities for Home Defence in 1916 and the airfield became a RFC base operating BE type aircraft of 37 Squadron (50th Wing). The airfield was closed in 1919.

During the Second World War, Burnham was the training base for one of the first Commando battalions, led by Lt-Col Dunford-Slater. From 1943 to 1945 it was HMS St Mathew, base for up to 1400 sailors training on minor landing craft. The navy occupied the Royal Corinthian Yacht Club and a site at Creeksea. Unconnected with these activities, the area often witnessed Luftwaffe crashes and bomb, mine and V-weapon explosions – German parachute mines caused fatalities in the town and at nearby Southminster.

Since 1966 Burnham-on-Crouch has had an RNLI lifeboat presence. Initially it operated only during the sailing season, but from 1987 it has done so all year. The on-shore facilities are in the marina with two floating boathouses in Burnham yacht harbour.

== Society and culture ==
Burnham-on-Crouch holds a bi-annual charity fund-raising pub crawl, an event which first took place in June 2007. Typically more than 100 local people walk through the town in themed fancy dress raising money for the Samaritans. There is both a summer and winter edition of the crawl.

On the last Saturday of September, the town holds its Illuminated Carnival, which was held for the 100th year in 2008. The carnival takes place on the High Street and Quay with stalls, sideshows and displays, and culminates with a grand illuminated procession in the evening, which leaves from the clock tower and proceeds around the town. There is also a fancy-dress competition for children. The carnival is sponsored by local businesses.

The Essex town is mentioned in the song "Billericay Dickie", by Ian Dury. This song alludes to Burnham's somewhat upmarket status in the county, with the invitation "Oh golly, oh gosh, Come and lie on the couch, With a nice bit of posh, From Burnham-on-Crouch."

== Governance ==
There are three tiers of local government covering Burnham-on-Crouch, at parish, district, and county level: Burnham-on-Crouch Town Council, Maldon District Council, and Essex County Council. The town council is based at offices on Chapel Road.

=== Administrative history ===
Burnham was an ancient parish in the Dengie Hundred of Essex. When elected parish and district councils were established in 1894, Burnham was initially given a parish council and included in the Maldon Rural District. Shortly afterwards it was decided to remove Burnham from the rural district and convert the parish into its own urban district, which took effect in 1898. Whereas the legal name of the parish was just Burnham, the urban district was officially named Burnham-on-Crouch.

In 1934 the urban district was enlarged to take in the area of the neighbouring parish of Creeksea, which was abolished.

Burnham-on-Crouch Urban District was abolished in 1974 under the Local Government Act 1972, becoming part of the new Maldon District. A successor parish called Burnham-on-Crouch was created at the same time, covering the area of the former urban district, with its parish council taking the name Burnham-on-Crouch Town Council.

== Transport ==
=== Railway ===
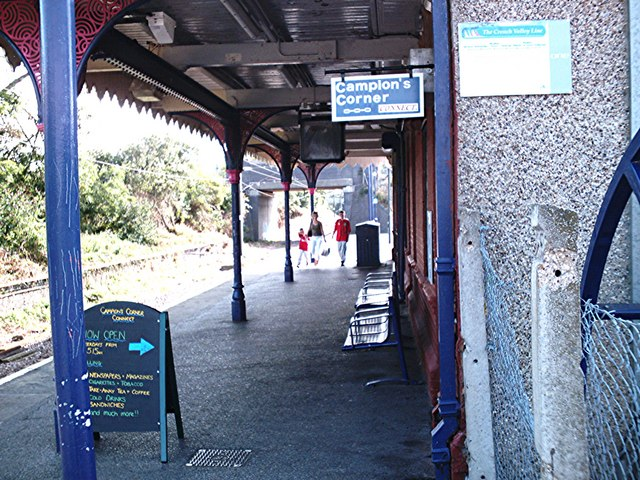
Burnham-on-Crouch station

Burnham-on-Crouch railway station is a stop on the Crouch Valley Line, which runs between Wickford and Southminster. The branch line escaped the Beeching cuts, as it was used to supply the nearby Bradwell nuclear power station. The line was electrified in the 1980s.

Greater Anglia provides regular services to Wickford and Southminster, with direct services extending to and from London Liverpool Street during peak hours, thus allowing the town's inclusion in the London commuter belt.

=== Buses ===
Bus services are operated by First Essex, Stephensons of Essex and Fords Coaches. Routes link the town with Chelmsford, Maldon, Latchingdon, South Woodham Ferrers and Southminster.

=== Road ===
The town is served by 2 B-roads, the B1010 to Maldon and the B1021 to Bradwell-on-Sea.

== Media ==
Local TV coverage is provided by BBC East and ITV Anglia. Television signals are received from the Sudbury and the local relay TV transmitters.BBC South East and ITV Meridian can also be received from either the Bluebell Hill or Dover TV transmitters.

Local radio stations are BBC Essex, Heart East, Radio Essex and Saint FM, a community based station which broadcast from the town.

The town is served by a local newspaper, the Maldon and Burnham Standard.

== Sport ==
=== Yachting ===
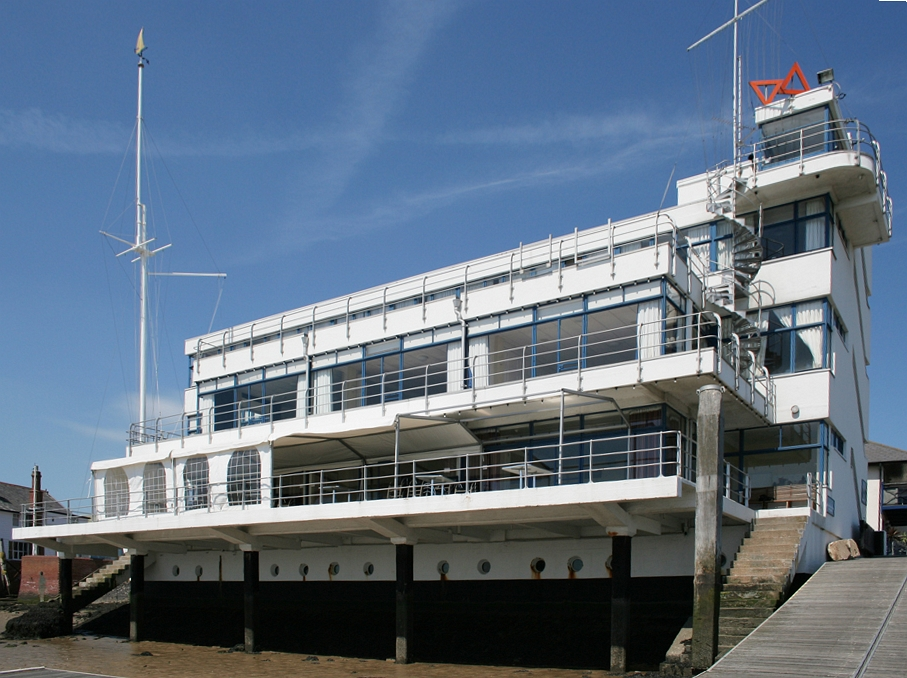
The Royal Corinthian Yacht Club at Burnham-on-Crouch, Essex. The international style building was designed by Joseph Emberton in 1931

Burnham-on-Crouch hosts an annual sailing event known as Burnham Week, which takes place in the last week of August. The week includes competitive yacht and dinghy racing on the River Crouch. The event is shared among the four established sailing clubs in Burnham: The Royal Corinthian Yacht Club (linked to the sailing club with the same name in Cowes, Isle of Wight), The Royal Burnham Yacht Club, The Crouch Yacht Club, and The Burnham Sailing Club.

This annual yacht regatta dates back to 1893. In the early years, Burnham Week was regarded as the last event in the sailing calendar. In the days before marinas afforded year-round access, many yachts were laid up for the winter in mud-berths on the east coast rivers. The racing fleets worked their way along the south coast, enjoying various events and regattas, having a final fling at Burnham before laying up. Today, the event is still growing strongly and the various sailing clubs produce many highly regarded sailors. The week provides a range of competitive racing events as well as a full party programme.

=== Other sporting activities ===
Burnham-on-Crouch has a non-league football club Burnham Ramblers F.C., which plays at Leslie Fields.

There are rugby union, cricket and lawn bowls clubs, all of which compete at local, county and regional levels.

Burnham Golf Club, an 18-hole course, is at Creeksea, approximately 1.5 miles from the town centre.

== Notable people ==
- Neil Faith, professional wrestler, attended St Mary's Primary School, Burnham-on-Crouch
- Keith Musto, received a silver medal for sailing in the Tokyo 1964 Olympics and was the founder of the Musto clothing company
- Kate Walsh, musician, from Burnham-on-Crouch
- Helen Watson, musician, lives in Burnham-on-Crouch
- Una Lucy Silberrad (1872-1955), a feminist novelist who lived in Burnham in later life. She is buried in the churchyard.
- Lenny Rush, BAFTA winning actor, from Burnham-on-Crouch
