= Althorne railway station =

Railway station in Essex, England

Coordinates: 51.648°N 0.752°E

Althorne
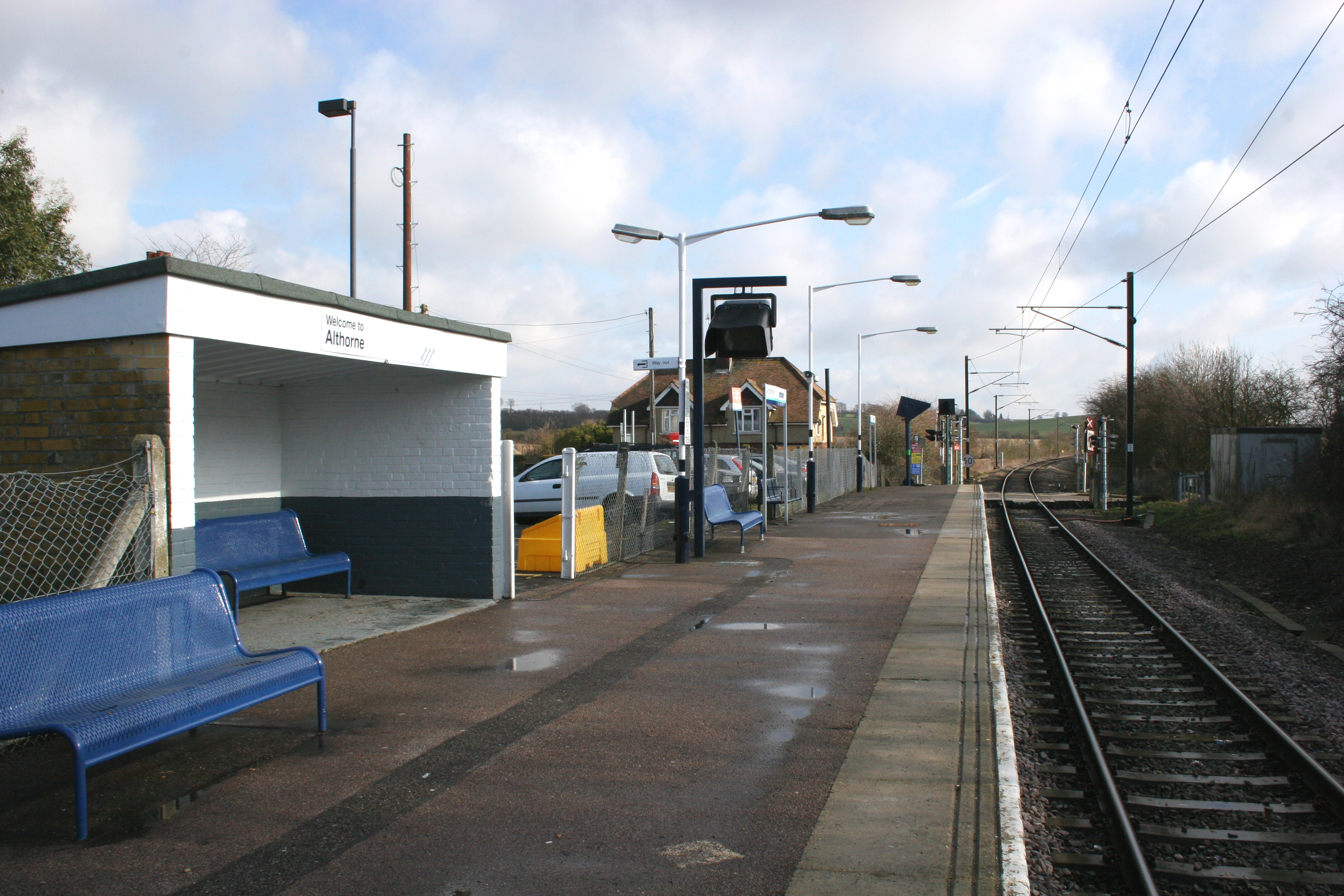

General information
- Location: Althorne, Maldon; England
- Grid reference: TQ905979
- Manager: Greater Anglia
- Platforms: 1

Other information
- Station code: ALN
- Classification: DfT category F2

History
- Original company: Great Eastern Railway
- Post-grouping: London and North Eastern Railway

Key dates
- 1 July 1889: Opened

Passengers
- 2021/22: ▲18,576
- 2022/23: ▲21,908
- 2023/24: ▲29,314
- 2024/25: ▲33,650
- 2025/26: ▼28,126
Location
Notes
- Passenger statistics from the Office of Rail and Road

Althorne railway station is a stop on the Crouch Valley Line in the East of England, serving the village of Althorne, Essex. It is 40 miles 27 chains (64.92 km) down the line from London Liverpool Street and is situated between North Fambridge to the west and Burnham-on-Crouch to the east. The station is managed by Greater Anglia, which operates all services. The Engineer's Line Reference for line is WIS; the station's three-letter station code is ALN. The single platform, north of the running line, has an operational length for eight-coach trains.

== History ==
The line and station were opened on 1 June 1889 for goods and on 1 July 1889 for passenger services by the Great Eastern Railway. The facilities included a single platform with station buildings, a goods yard and a 30-lever signal box south of the station. Two miles east of Althorne, Creeksea sidings (facing points in the down direction) received traffic to and from the Creeksea ferry from 1889 to 1947.

Ownership passed to the London and North Eastern Railway, following the Grouping of 1923, and then to the Eastern Region of British Railways upon nationalisation in 1948. When sectorisation was introduced, Althorne was managed by Network SouthEast until the privatisation of British Rail. The goods yard closed on 19 December 1960 and the signal box on 21 January 1967. The level crossing to the east of the station was normally closed to road vehicles, but was later converted to an automatic open crossing with lights.

Overhead line electrification at 25 kV of the Wickford to Southminster line was completed on 12 May 1986.

== Services ==
All services at Althorne are operated by Greater Anglia, using Class 720 electric multiple units.

The typical off-peak service is one train every 40 minutes in each direction between Wickford and Southminster. During peak hours, some services continue beyond Wickford to and from Shenfield and London Liverpool Street. On Sundays, the service is reduced to hourly in each direction.

| Preceding station | National Rail | Following station |
|---|---|---|
| North Fambridge | Greater Anglia Crouch Valley Line | Burnham-on-Crouch |
