= Aln =

Aln, ALN, or AlN may refer to:

== Organizations ==
=== Paramilitary ===
- Ação Libertadora Nacional, a Brazilian Marxist–Leninist guerrilla movement
- Armée de Libération Nationale, the armed wing of the nationalist National Liberation Front of Algeria during the Algerian War

=== Political ===
- Africa Liberal Network, an organization of political parties in Africa
- Alianza Liberal Nicaragüense, a political party in Nicaragua
- Nationalist Liberation Alliance (Alianza Libertadora Nacionalista, ALN), Argentine fascist movement
- Action libérale nationale, a short-lived political party in Canada

== Transportation ==
- Althorne railway station, England, station code ALN
- Alton station (Illinois), U.S., station code ALN
- St. Louis Regional Airport, Illinois, U.S., IATA airport code ALN

== Other uses ==
- River Aln, England
- Aln, a historic Swedish unit of measurement
- Aluminium nitride
- AmericanLife TV Network
- ALN Magazine
- Gheg Albanian, ISO 639-3 language code aln
- Additional learning needs
