= Burnham-on-Crouch railway station =

Railway station in Essex, England

Burnham-on-Crouch
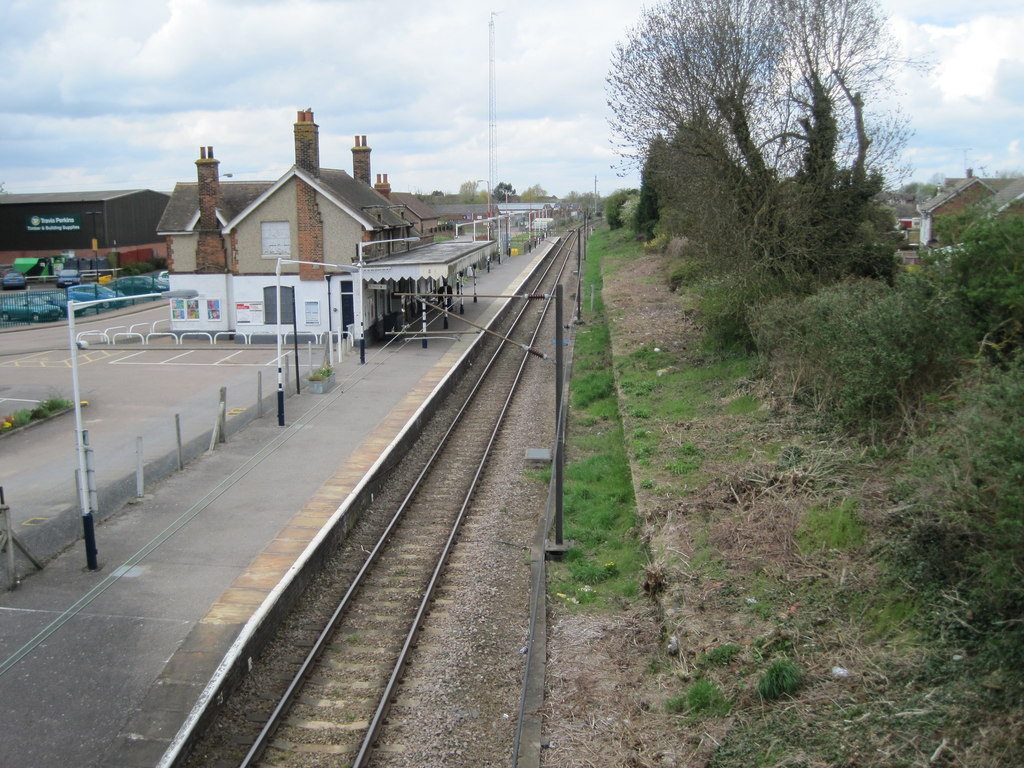
- Burnham-on-Crouch station in 2013

General information
- Location: Burnham-on-Crouch, Maldon; England
- Coordinates: 51.6336°N 0.8120°E
- Grid reference: TQ947965
- Managed by: Greater Anglia
- Platforms: 1

Other information
- Station code: BUU
- Classification: DfT category D

History
- Original company: Great Eastern Railway
- Pre-grouping: Great Eastern Railway
- Post-grouping: London and North Eastern Railway

Key dates
- 1 July 1889: Opened

Passengers
- 2020/21: ▼39,922
- 2021/22: ▲0.153 million
- 2022/23: ▲0.163 million
- 2023/24: ▲0.193 million
- 2024/25: ▲0.228 million
Location
Notes
- Passenger statistics from the Office of Rail and Road

Burnham-on-Crouch railway station is a stop on the Crouch Valley Line in the East of England, serving the town of Burnham-on-Crouch, Essex. It is 43 miles 24 chains (69.68 km) down the line from London Liverpool Street and is situated between Althorne to the west and Southminster to the east. The Engineer's Line Reference for the line is WIS; the station's three-letter station code is BUU. The platform has an operational length for eight-coach trains. The station is managed by Greater Anglia, which also operates all trains serving it. It is located near the Mangapps Railway Museum.

== History ==
The line and station were opened on 1 June 1889 for goods and on 1 July 1889 for passenger services by the Great Eastern Railway. The station had two platforms, both with station buildings and connected by a footbridge. A 24-lever signal box was located on the north of the line to the west of the station; this was closed on 21 January 1967. There were sidings and a goods shed to the west of the station. The line and station were passed to the London and North Eastern Railway following the Grouping of 1923. It then passed to the Eastern Region of British Railways upon nationalisation in 1948. The north platform was closed by 1969.

When sectorisation was introduced, Burnham-on-Crouch was managed by Network SouthEast until the privatisation of British Rail.

The line was electrified using 25 kV overhead line electrification on 12 May 1986.

== Services ==
All services at Burnham-on-Crouch are operated by Greater Anglia using Class 720 electric multiple units.

The typical off-peak service is one train every 40 minutes in each direction between Wickford and Southminster. During peak hours, some services continue beyond Wickford to and from Shenfield and London Liverpool Street. On Sundays, the service is reduced to hourly in each direction.

Preceding station	National Rail	Following station
Althorne	Greater Anglia Crouch Valley Line	Southminster
