= North Fambridge =

Village in Essex, England

Coordinates: 51.642°N 0.675°E

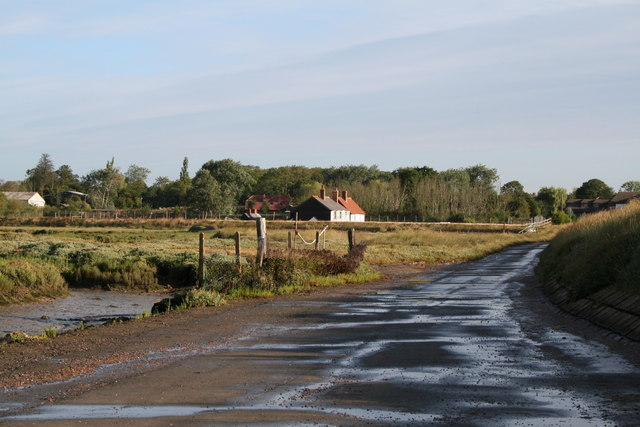

- Location within Essex
- Population: 867 (Parish, 2021)
- OS grid reference: TQ852972
- District: Maldon
- Shire county: Essex
- Region: East
- Country: England
- Sovereign state: United Kingdom
- Post town: Chelmsford
- Postcode district: CM3
- Dialling code: 01621
- Police: Essex
- Fire: Essex
- Ambulance: East of England
- UK Parliament: Maldon

North Fambridge is a village and civil parish on the Dengie peninsula in the English county of Essex. At the 2021 census the parish had a population of 867.

North Fambridge is on the north bank of the River Crouch opposite South Fambridge and is served by North Fambridge railway station on the Crouch Valley Line. Administratively, North Fambridge forms part of the ward of Purleigh in the district of Maldon.

Adjoining the village is Blue House Farm, a 605-acre (2.45 km^{2}) Site of Special Scientific Interest and nature reserve owned by the Essex Wildlife Trust.

In the Domesday Book, North Fambridge was known as 'Fanbruge'.

North Fambridge is home to the Fambridge Yacht Haven Middle Distance Triathlon. The first event took place on 24 July 2011 and was the first Half Ironman Triathlon in Essex and the wider region.

== Local amenities ==
The local public house is The Ferry Boat Inn. The North Fambridge Yacht Club and The West Wick Yacht Club are based in the village.

Holy Trinity Church has been serving the community for at least 200 years.
