= Ostend, Essex =

Hamlet in Essex, England

Coordinates: 51.64300°N 0.79521°E

Ostend
- Location within Essex
- OS grid reference: TQ935975
- Civil parish: Burnham-on-Crouch
- District: Maldon
- Shire county: Essex
- Region: East
- Country: England
- Sovereign state: United Kingdom
- Post town: Burnham-on-Crouch
- Postcode district: CM0
- Police: Essex
- Fire: Essex
- Ambulance: East of England
- UK Parliament: Maldon and East Chelmsford

Ostend is a hamlet in the civil parish of Burnham-on-Crouch, in the Maldon district, in the county of Essex, England.

It is located about a mile north-west of the town of Burnham-on-Crouch.
