= Battlesbridge railway station =

Railway station in Essex, England

Coordinates: 51.625°N 0.566°E

Battlesbridge
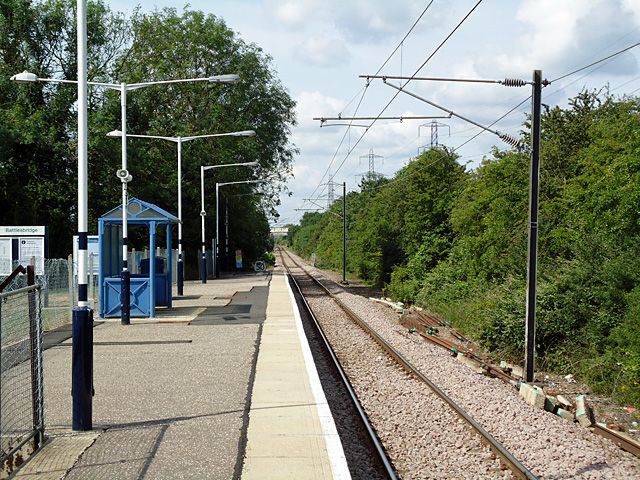
- The station's platform, 2011

General information
- Location: Battlesbridge, Chelmsford; England
- Grid reference: TQ776949
- Manager: Greater Anglia
- Platforms: 1

Other information
- Station code: BLB
- Classification: DfT category F2

Passengers
- 2021/22: ▲18,712
- 2022/23: ▲19,086
- 2023/24: ▲21,852
- 2024/25: ▲22,560
- 2025/26: ▲32,784
Location
Notes
- Passenger statistics from the Office of Rail and Road

Battlesbridge railway station is a stop on the Crouch Valley Line in the East of England, serving the village of Battlesbridge, Essex. It is 31 miles 40 chains (50.7 km) down the line from London Liverpool Street and is situated between Wickford to the west and South Woodham Ferrers. Train services are operated by Greater Anglia.

== History ==
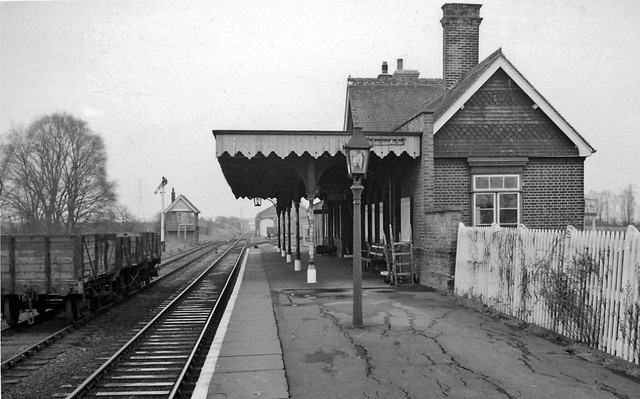
Battlesbridge in 1961, seven years before the station buildings were demolished

The line and station were opened on 1 June 1889 for goods and on 1 July 1889 for passenger services by the Great Eastern Railway. The station had a single platform with a station building, a goods shed, a goods yard including cattle pens and a 34-lever signal box.

The freight service was withdrawn on 4 October 1965; the goods loop and signal box were closed on 7 December 1966. All of the station buildings were demolished in 1968.

Electrification of the Wickford to Southminster line using 25 kV overhead line electrification was completed on 12 May 1986.

== Services ==
All services at Battlesbridge are operated by Greater Anglia using Class 720 electric multiple units.

The typical off-peak service is one train every 40 minutes in each direction between Wickford and Southminster. During peak hours, some services continue beyond Wickford to and from Shenfield and London Liverpool Street. On Sundays, the service is reduced to hourly in each direction.

Preceding station	National Rail	Following station
Wickford	Greater Anglia Crouch Valley Line	South Woodham Ferrers
