= Crouch Valley line =

Railway line in Essex, England

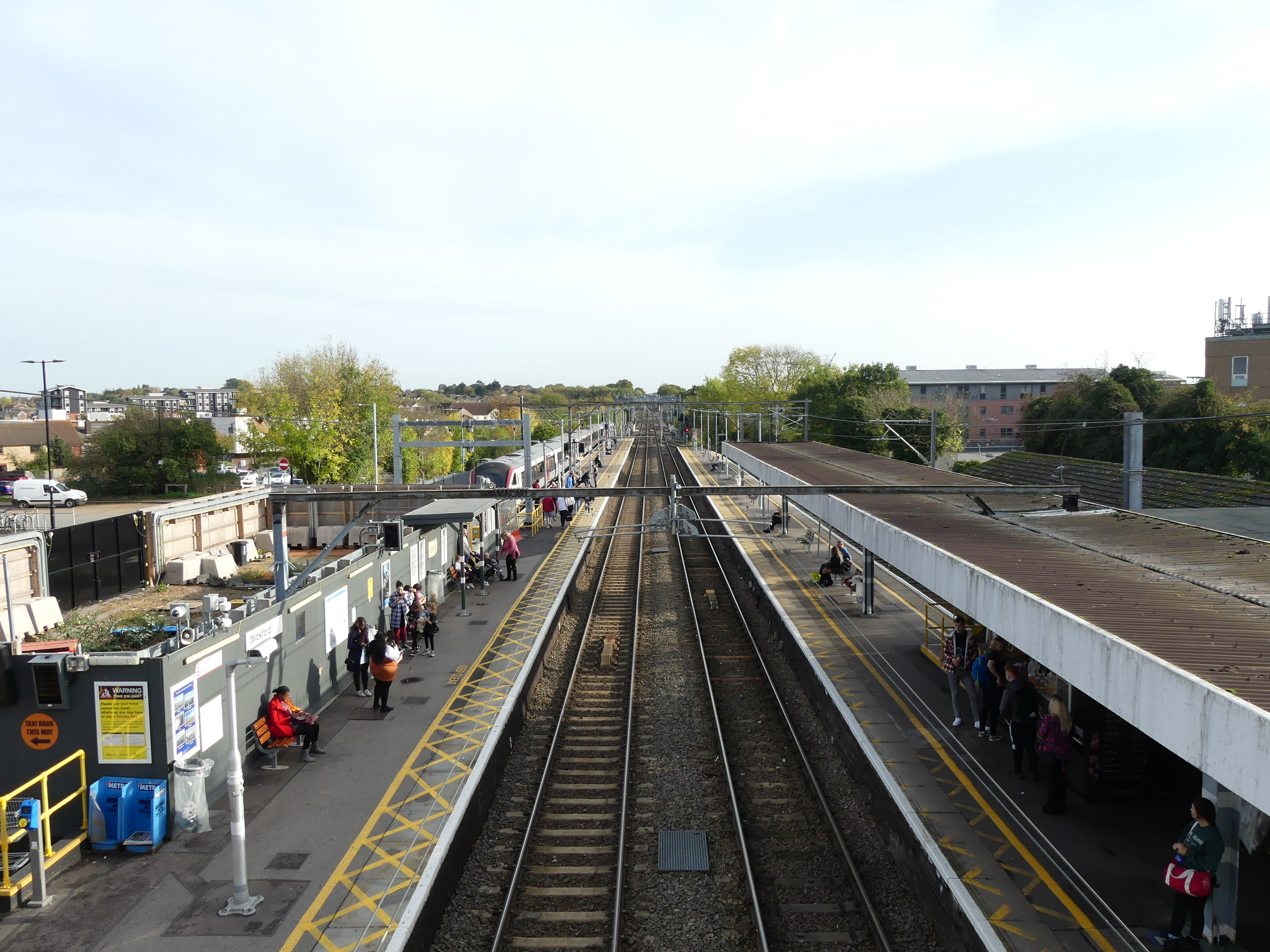
- Wickford is the western terminus of the line. The station building is undergoing rebuilding as of October 2022, as can be seen in this view looking east. The Crouch Valley bay platforms are visible either side of the through platforms.

Overview
- Status: Operational
- Owner: Network Rail
- Locale: Essex; East of England
- Termini: Wickford; Southminster
- Stations: 7

Service
- Type: Commuter rail
- System: National Rail
- Operator(s): Greater Anglia
- Rolling stock: Class 720

History
- Opened: 1889

Technical
- Line length: 16 miles 40 chains (26.6 km)
- Number of tracks: 1
- Character: Rural
- Track gauge: 4 ft 8 1/2 in (1,435 mm) standard gauge
- Electrification: 25 kV 50 Hz AC OHLE
- Operating speed: 60 mph maximum
Route map
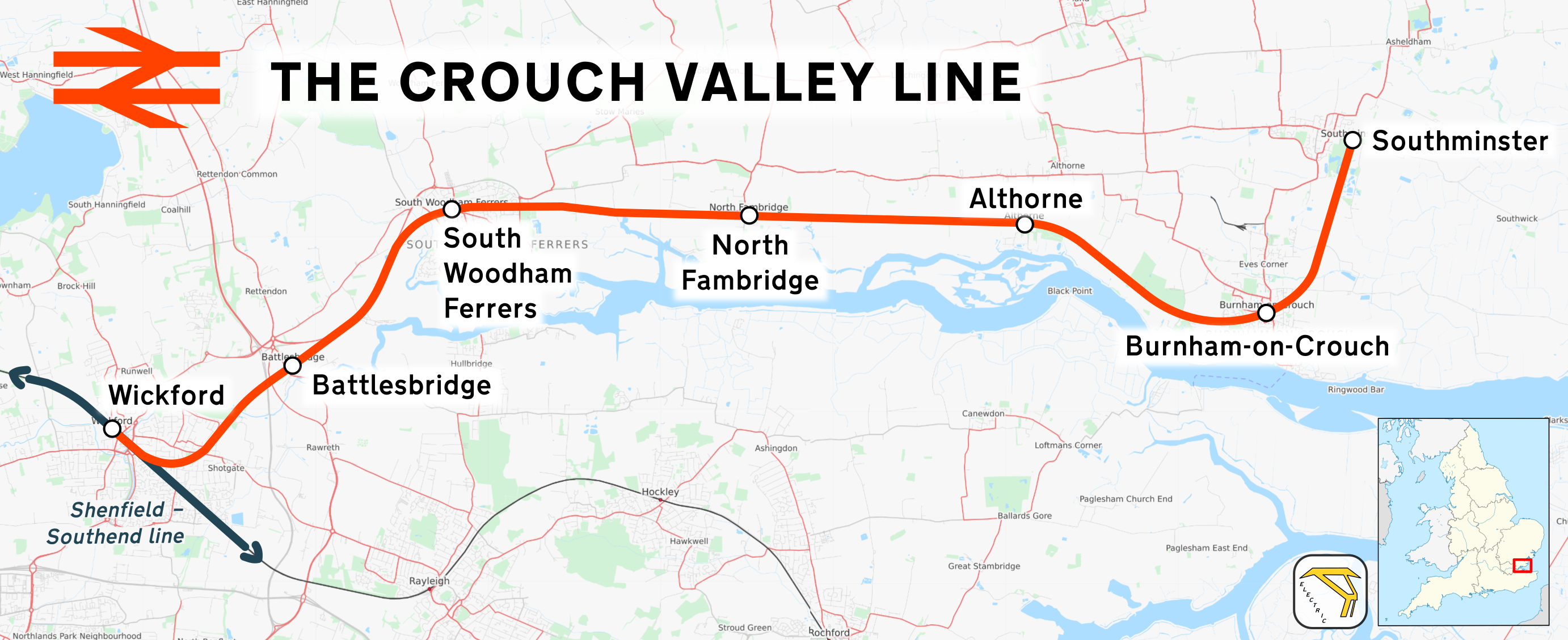
(Click to expand)

The Crouch Valley line (sometimes referred to as the Southminster branch line) is a branch line off the Shenfield–Southend line in Essex, in the east of England. It links Wickford in the west to Southminster in the east. During peak hours, trains connect to or from the Great Eastern Main Line at Shenfield, and its London terminus at Liverpool Street.

The line is part of the Network Rail Strategic Route 7, SRS 07.05, and is classified as a London and South East commuter line. The stations and passenger services on the line are currently operated by Greater Anglia.

== History ==
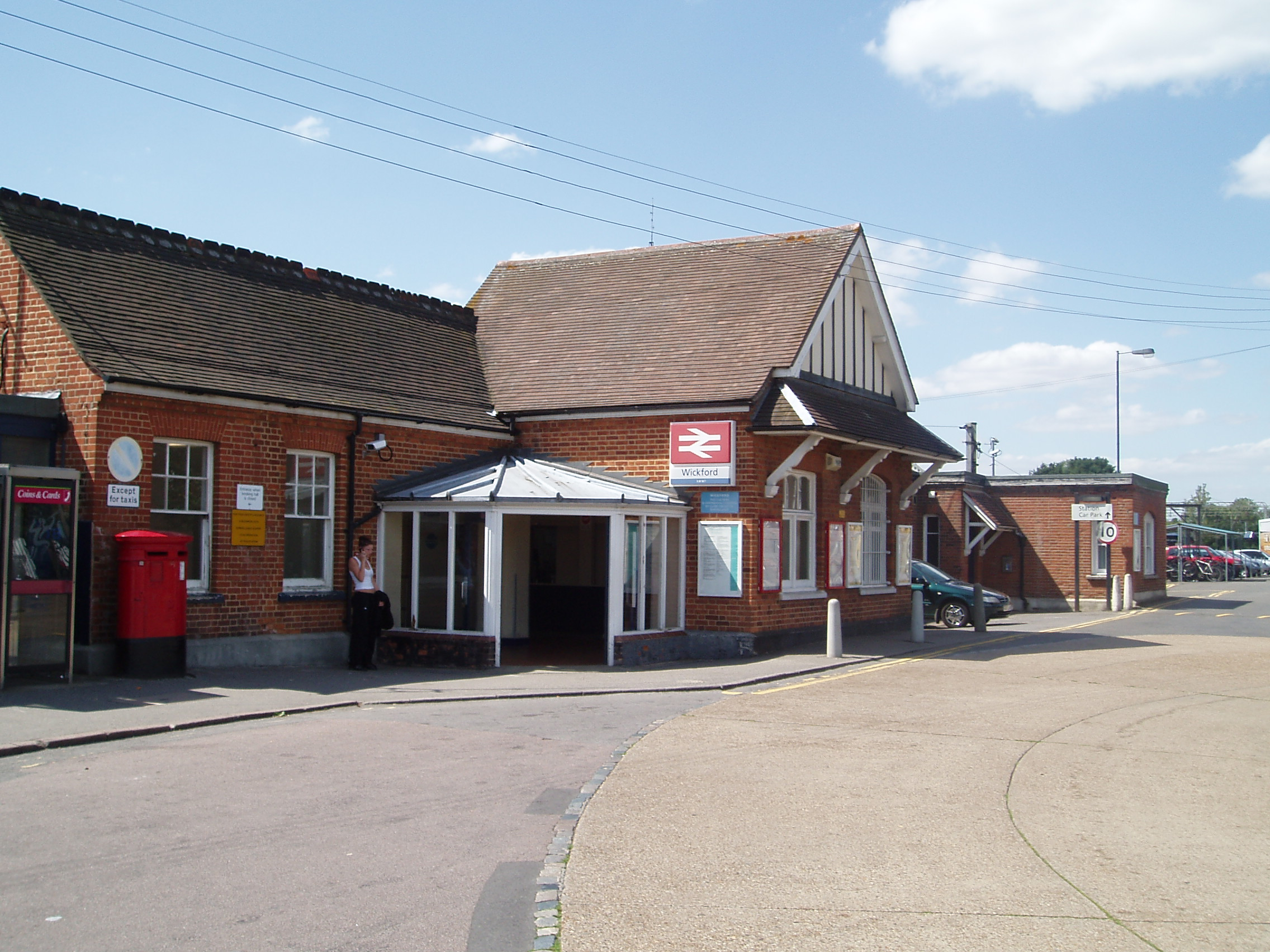
Wickford station as it appeared in 2006.

The route, which is 16 miles 40 chains (26.6 km) in length, was opened to goods traffic on 1 June 1889 and to passengers on 1 July 1889, by the Great Eastern Railway (GER). It was electrified at 25 kV AC overhead in 1986.

The number of trains on the Crouch Valley line is restricted to two trains per hour (one in each direction) at weekends and two every 40 minutes on weekdays, with some additional services during peak times.

== Nuclear freight ==
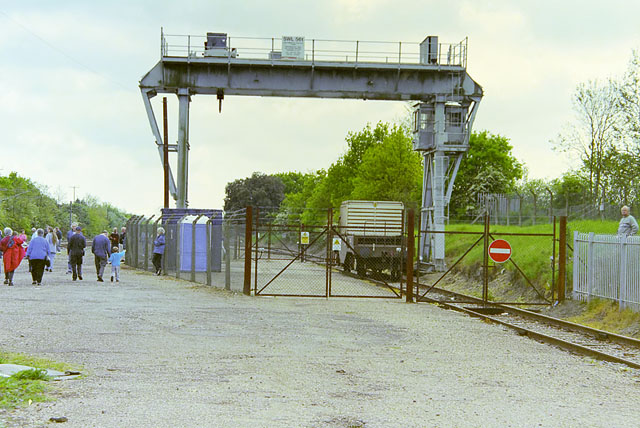
Southminster nuclear flask transhipment facility, 2002

A nuclear flask handling facility operated to the south of Southminster station from 1962 during the operation and decommissioning of Bradwell nuclear power station, this facility was last used on 31 August 2006. Waste and fuel rods were transported to Sellafield. The timetable in the 1990s allowed for this traffic by the absence of a down and up passenger train on the branch late on Wednesday mornings.

== Infrastructure ==
The line diverges from the Shenfield–Southend line at Wickford. It is single track throughout, except for one passing loop at North Fambridge (the midpoint of the line) to allow trains travelling in opposite directions to pass one another.

Only Wickford and South Woodham Ferrers have platforms long enough to accommodate 10-coach trains, while each of the other stations on the line can accommodate five coaches; however, services on the line have only formed of five carriages due to the short terminus platform at Wickford being able to accommodate one five-car train.

Wickford's station building was demolished in 2021 for rebuilding; one key improvement has been to extend platform 1 to allow for the operation of the new longer trains on the Crouch Valley line. This has now been completed allowing longer, class 720 units to serve the branch and has since lead to the downfall of the 321’s on this branch.

=== Stations ===
The following table summarises the line's seven stations, their distance measured from London Liverpool Street and estimated number of passenger entries/exits in 2018–19:

Station	Location	Local authority	Mileage	Patronage
Wickford	Wickford	Borough of Basildon	29	2,261,210
Battlesbridge	Battlesbridge	City of Chelmsford	31 1/2	16,446
South Woodham Ferrers	South Woodham Ferrers	City of Chelmsford	34	513,228
North Fambridge	North Fambridge	District of Maldon	37 1/4	83,038
Althorne	Althorne	District of Maldon	40 1/4	43,816
Burnham-on-Crouch	Burnham-on-Crouch	District of Maldon	43 1/4	241,362
Southminster	Southminster	District of Maldon	45 1/2	128,666

== Services ==
The typical off-peak service is of one train every 40 minutes either each direction, with additional services at peak times. Some peak services continue to or from Shenfield and/or London Liverpool Street, via the Great Eastern Main Line. On Sundays, the service reduces to hourly.

All passenger services on this route are operated by Greater Anglia, with Class 720 electric multiple units.

There are limited ticket facilities along the route, so a conductor is often provided on the train to assist passengers.
