= Wickford railway station =

Railway station in Essex, England

Coordinates: 51.615°N 0.519°E

Wickford
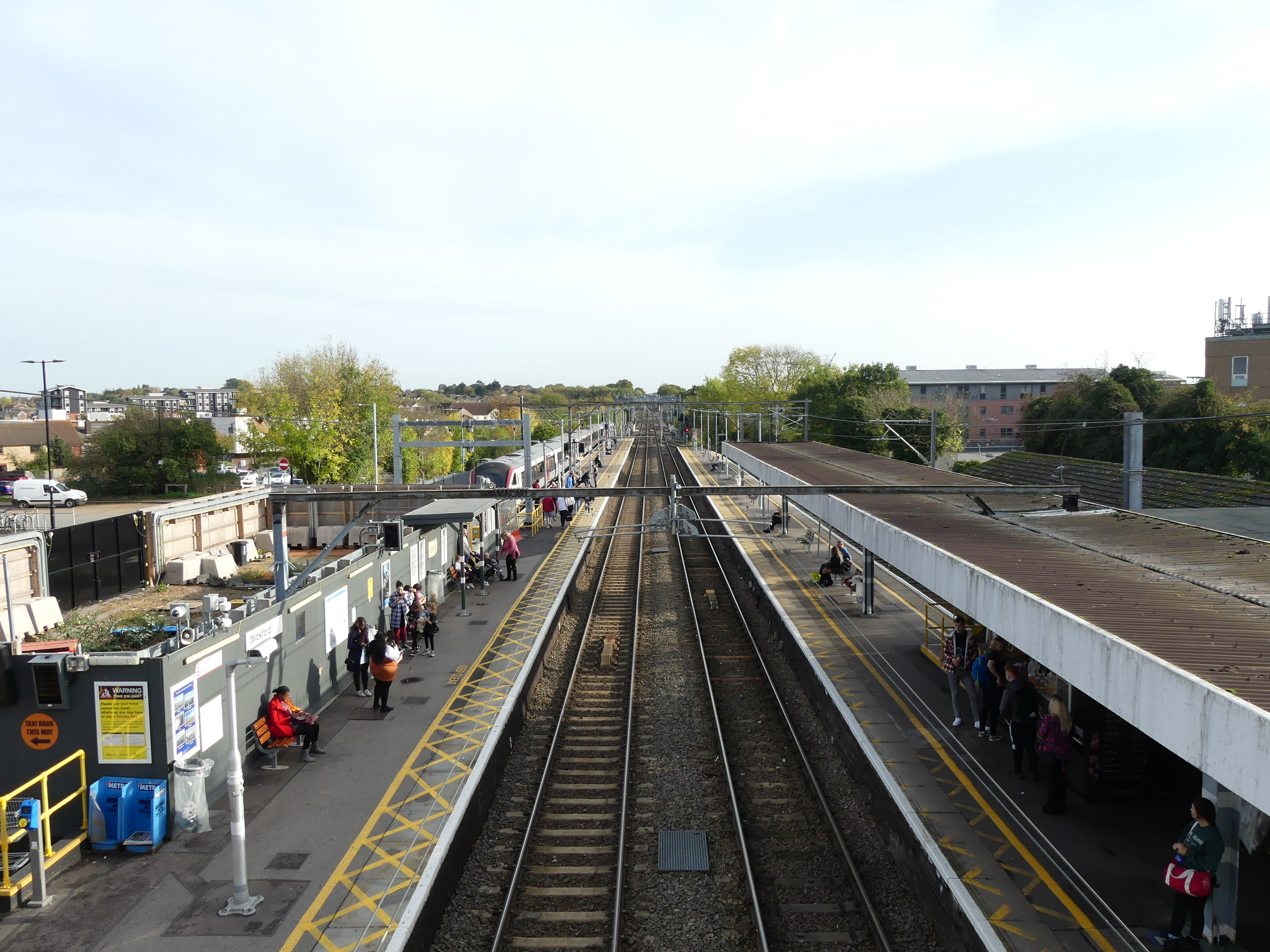
- Wickford in 2022 after the station building was demolished

General information
- Location: Wickford, Basildon; England
- Grid reference: TQ745936
- Manager: Greater Anglia
- Platforms: 4

Other information
- Station code: WIC
- Classification: DfT category C2

History
- Opened: 1889

Passengers
- 2020/21: ▼0.468 million
- Interchange: ▼77,071
- 2021/22: ▲1.178 million
- Interchange: ▲0.237 million
- 2022/23: ▲1.505 million
- Interchange: ▲0.361 million
- 2023/24: ▲1.717 million
- Interchange: ▲0.407 million
- 2024/25: ▲1.838 million
- Interchange: 0.407 million
Location
Notes
- Passenger statistics from the Office of Rail and Road

Wickford railway station is a junction stop on the Shenfield to Southend Line and also the western terminus of the Crouch Valley Line in the east of England, serving the town of Wickford in the Basildon district of Essex. It is 29 miles 2 chains (46.71 km) down the line from London Liverpool Street and is situated between Billericay to the west and, to the east, Rayleigh on the Southend Line and Battlesbridge on the Crouch Valley Line. The Engineer's Line Reference for the line is SSV, the station's three-letter station code is WIC.

Most Southend services connect to the Great Eastern Main Line at Shenfield for northbound connections. Peak-time trains to/from Southminster also run through to London. Wickford station, and all trains serving it, are currently operated by Greater Anglia.

== History ==
The line from Shenfield to Wickford, along with the station, were opened for goods on 19 November 1888 and for passengers on 1 January 1889 by the Great Eastern Railway.

The station was previously called Wickford Junction, when the Crouch Valley route to Southminster also included a branch to Maldon West and more agricultural traffic passed through the station.

At the London end of the station, there once was a goods yard and turntable for steam locomotives; it was closed in 1954. A couple of sidings remain here for storing engineering vehicles or failed trains, but much of the railway land here is now in use as a car park for passengers. The line from Wickford to Southend Victoria was converted from semaphore signalling to 3-aspect, automatic and semi-automatic, colour light signals on 26 June 1938. At the same time, the signal boxes at Fanton, Rayleigh, Hockley and Rochford were decommissioned.

The Shenfield to Southend Victoria line was electrified using 1.5 kV DC overhead line electrification on 31 December 1956. This was changed to 6.25 kV AC in November 1960 and to 25 kV AC on 25 January 1979. Platforms 1 and 4 were electrified when the Southminster branch was electrified on 12 May 1986.

The signal box that was formerly located at the end of platforms 3 and 4, before the bridge crossing Wickford High Street, was demolished in the early 1990s following the introduction of new signalling controlled from Liverpool Street. The upper floor of the original Great Eastern Railway station buildings on platforms 1 and 2 were destroyed by fire in the late 1990s; however, the ground floor (including the ticket office, waiting room and staff accommodation) was saved and remained in use until 2021.

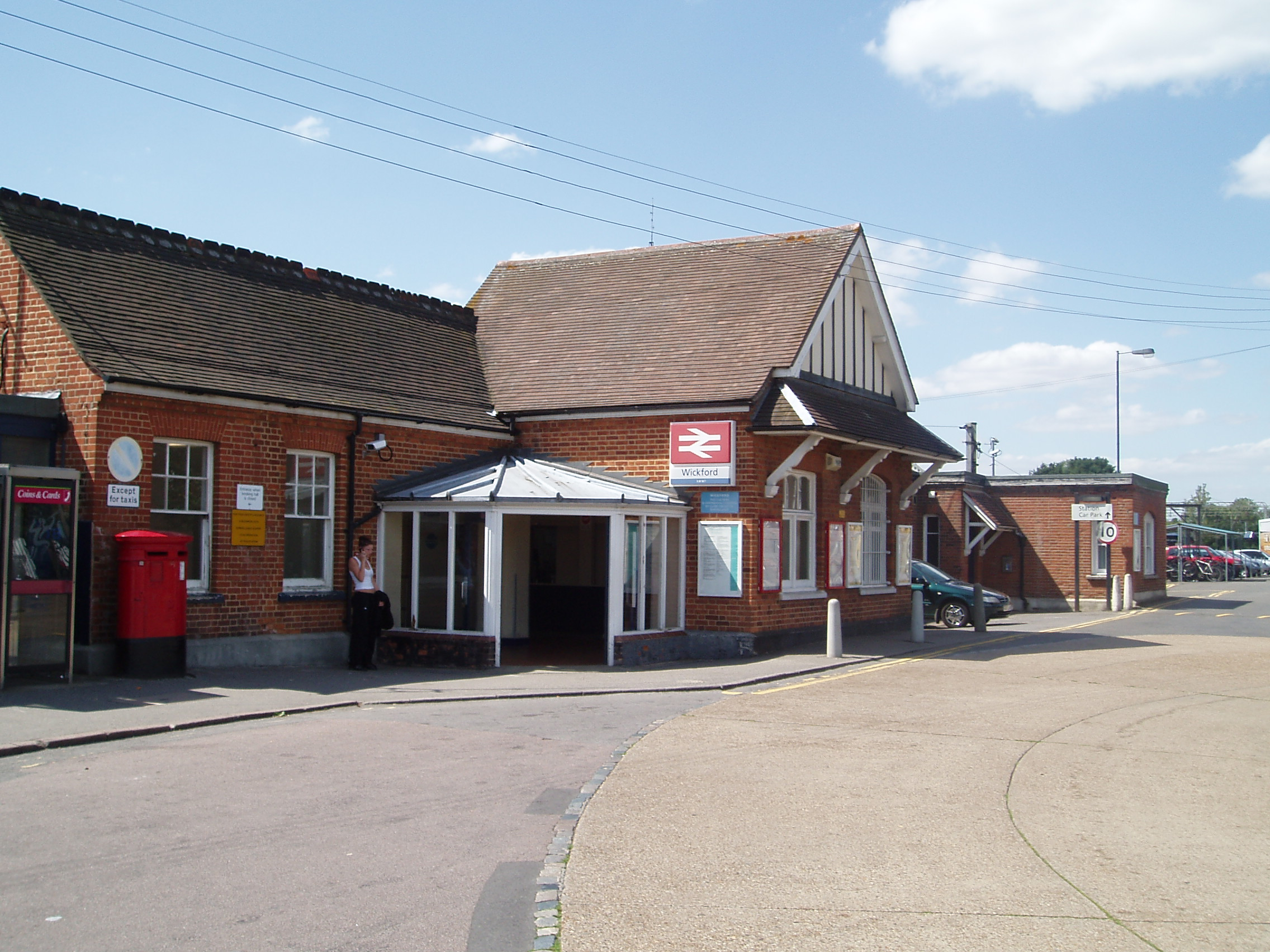
The former station building pictured in 2006

In 2020, Greater Anglia submitted plans to demolish the station building so that platform 1 could be extended for the new longer trains. It was demolished in 2021. The extended platform was opened on 26 June 2021. In September 2025, work started on the construction of a replacement station building, with an estimated completion by autumn 2026. The new building will include a ticket office, toilets, waiting room and platform awnings.

=== Accidents and incidents ===
- On 24 February 1965, the 10:18 departure from Liverpool Street for Southend Victoria derailed upon departure from Wickford when a set of points was moved while the train passed over them, causing the rear coaches to be diverted onto the Southminster branch line and be derailed. The incident caused damage to the infrastructure and carriages, and minor injury to two passengers on board the train.
- On 31 January 1971, a collision occurred between a newspaper delivery train and the 04:04 passenger service from Southend Victoria, bound for Liverpool Street. Nobody was injured, however two carriages of the passenger train were extensively damaged and some minor damage was caused to the newspaper train. The newspaper train's driver had left his cab to check signals without having applied the brakes, leading to the train slipping back down the gradient of the Southminster branch line, into the Southend train which was stopped on the main line at Wickford.
- On 14 August 2026, at around 14:12, the rear of a Greater Anglia ten coach Class 720 train working the 13:51 Southend Victoria to London Liverpool Street derailed on approach to the station.

== Description ==
Wickford station comprises four platforms:

- Two through platforms, with an operational length of 12 carriages:
  - 2 for eastbound services towards Southend
  - 3 for westbound services towards London.
- Two eastern-facing bay platforms at the eastern end of the station, each with an operational length of 5 carriages:
  - 1 for trains to Southminster
  - 4 is very rarely used.

== Services ==
All services at Wickford are operated by Greater Anglia. The typical off-peak service in trains per hour is:

- 3 tph to London Liverpool Street
- 3 tph to Southend Victoria
- 1 train every 40 minutes to Southminster

Additional services operate during peak hours.

On Sundays, services between London and Southend are reduced to 2 tph and services to Southminster are reduced to hourly.

Preceding station	National Rail	Following station
Billericay	Greater Anglia Shenfield–Southend line	Rayleigh
Terminus	Greater Anglia Crouch Valley Line	Battlesbridge
