= British Rail Class 720 =

British EMU train from the Bombardier Aventra family

British Rail Class 720 Aventra
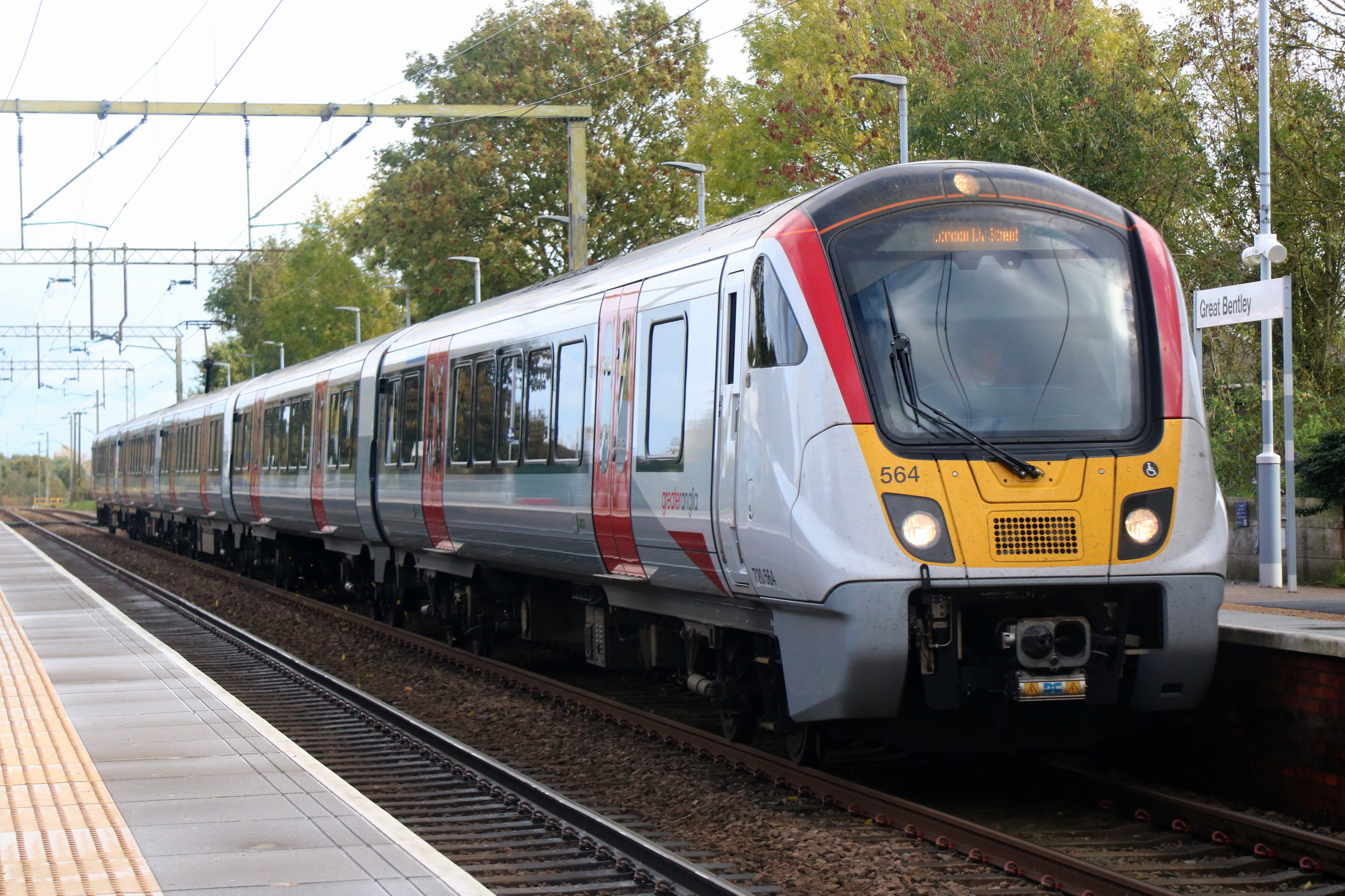
- Greater Anglia Class 720 at Great Bentley

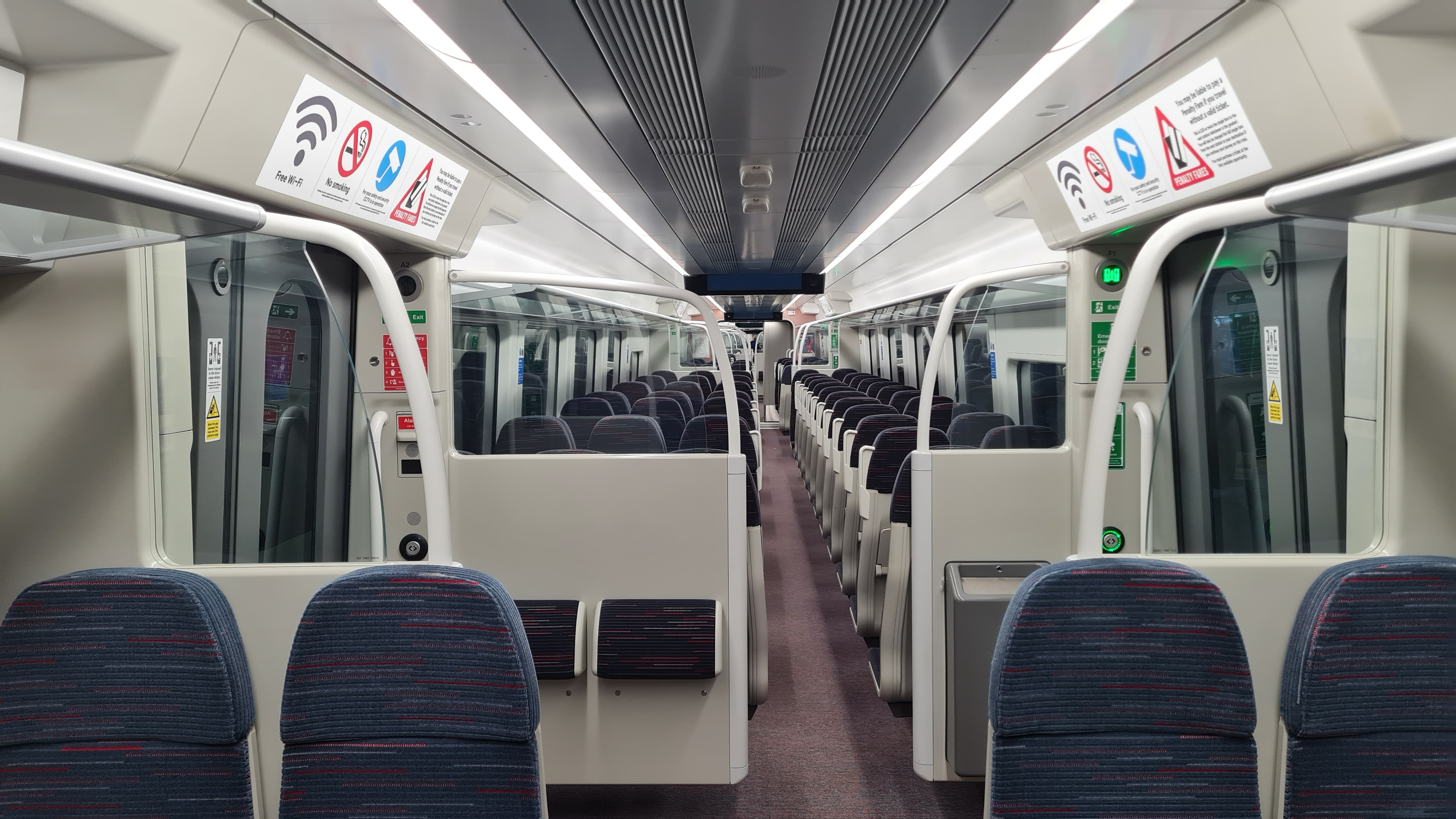
- The interior of a Greater Anglia Class 720 Aventra
- In service: 26 November 2020–present
- Manufacturers: Bombardier Transportation; Alstom
- Built at: Derby Litchurch Lane Works
- Family name: Aventra
- Replaced: Class 315 (Greater Anglia); Class 317 (Greater Anglia); Class 321 (Greater Anglia); Class 322 (Greater Anglia); Class 360 (Greater Anglia); Class 379 (Greater Anglia); Class 387; (c2c)
- Constructed: 2018–2024
- Number built: 145
- Number in service: 107
- Formation: 5 cars per unit: DMS-PMSL-MS2-MS3-DTSLW
- Diagram: DMS vehs.: EL237; PMSL vehs.: ER221; MS2 vehs.: ER222; MS3 vehs.: ER223; DTSLW vehs.: EQ205
- Fleet numbers: 720101–720144; 720501–720589; 720601–720612
- Capacity: 490 seats (Greater Anglia sets) plus 145 standees 443 seats (c2c sets) plus 236 standees
- Owner: Angel Trains
- Operators: Greater Anglia; c2c
- Depots: East Ham (London); Ilford (London)

Specifications
- Car body construction: Aluminium
- Train length: 122 m (400 ft 3 in)
- Car length: 24.2 m (79 ft 5 in)
- Width: 2.77 m (9 ft 1 in)
- Doors: Double-leaf sliding plug (2 per side per car)
- Maximum speed: 100 mph (161 km/h)
- Weight: 193.1 tonnes (190.1 long tons; 212.9 short tons)
- Power output: 2,300 kW (3,100 hp)
- Acceleration: 0.8 m/s^{2} (1.8 mph/s)
- Electric system: 25 kV 50 Hz AC overhead
- Current collection: Pantograph
- Bogies: Bombardier Flexx-Eco
- Safety systems: AWS; TPWS
- Coupling system: Dellner
- Multiple working: Within class
- Track gauge: 1,435 mm (4 ft 8 1/2 in) standard gauge

Notes/references
- Sourced from unless otherwise noted.

The British Rail Class 720 Aventra is a class of electric multiple unit (EMU) passenger train designed and produced by the rolling stock manufacturer Bombardier Transportation and its acquirer Alstom. The Class 720 is operated by both Greater Anglia and c2c.

145 Class 720 units were ordered in the five car configuration only; these are to be operated across multiple suburban lines leading out of both London Liverpool Street (Greater Anglia and c2c) and London Fenchurch Street (c2c). Originally intended to be introduced during 2019, delays were encountered during development that minorly impacted this timetable. On 26 November 2020, Greater Anglia commenced the Class 720's introduction. Its initial operations were centred on the London Liverpool Street to Southend Line. All Greater Anglia units were intended to be in service by the summer of 2020. c2c's fleet entered service on 27 September 2023.

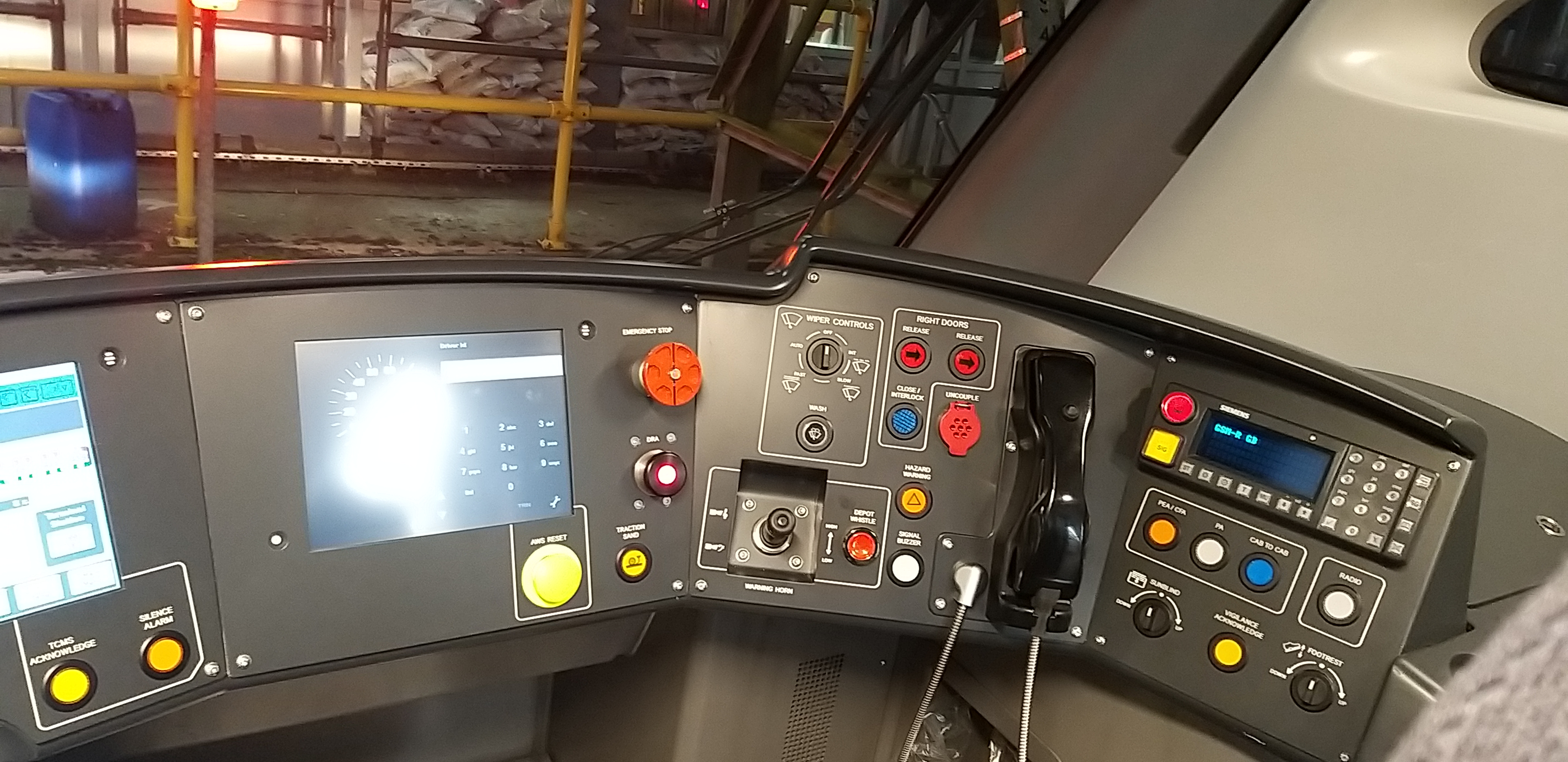
Cab interior of a Class 720

== Description ==
The Class 720 is a member of rolling stock manufacturer Bombardier's Aventra family of multiple units, having been developed from the company's successful line of Electrostar electric multiple units (EMUs). In comparison to the preceding Electrostar, with which it shares numerous elements, the Class 720 is a considerably lighter vehicle, and features longer carriages: a ten-car Class 720 train is approximately the same length as a 12-car Class 360 train, the ten-car Class 720 has a tare weight of 386 tonnes in contrast to the 516 tonnes of the 12-car Class 360 train, while providing considerably more seating.

Each car has a length of 24 m (79 ft), the bodyshell of which is composed of aluminium, the assembly of which using both welding and bolting techniques. The Class 720 has a maximum speed of 100 mph (160 km/h), possessing a starting tractive effort per motor of 21.6 kN (4,900 lbf) and a peak traction power at the wheel of 2,300 kW (3,100 hp) per unit to achieve its maximum rate of acceleration of 0.8 m/s^{2} (1.8 mph/s). The driver is seated in a central position within the forward cab; a second seat is provided for an observer/instructor.

All Class 720 orders as at October 2022 have been delivered in five-car configuration. The units have a length of 122 m (400 ft) and accommodate up to 540 seated passengers in a standard-class seating configuration. As of October 2022, no operator has chosen to configure their Class 720 fleets with first class accommodation.

The interior of Class 720 features a 3+2 seating arrangement. These seats are cantilevered above the floor to provide greater under-seat space for storing personal luggage as well as to ease cleaning. Each car has air conditioning throughout, while numerous passenger information systems, displaying passenger loading indicators among other information, are present across each carriage's interior. Every seat is provided with its own seat-back table and power sockets, while on-train Wi-Fi enables online connectivity throughout the journey. Onboard toilet facilities are also present. Akin to trains operated by the London Overground, the Class 720s have through gangways to encourage passengers to spread out across the train. The interior is also fully compliant with the Technical Specification for Interoperability for Persons of Reduced Mobility, featuring dedicated spaces for wheelchairs, as well as spaces for bicycles. One of the two toilets present in a five-car formation is also outfitted for greater accessibility.

In September 2017, Greater Anglia unveiled an early mockup of the interior intended to be fitted to the Class 720 fleet. This was used as part of a consultation that solicited 1,000 responses from members of the public. Numerous changes were subsequently made to the interior. Alterations included the replacement of the originally intended Fainsa seating with softer seating supplied by Kiel, as well as the addition of seat back tables. The units also featured underfloor heating, eliminating the need for the bodyside heaters and thus increasing floorspace for more passengers. This heating arrangement was allegedly the first use amongst any train on the British railway system.

== History ==
=== Greater Anglia ===
In August 2016, Abellio Greater Anglia was awarded the East Anglia franchise with a commitment to replace all of the existing fleet. As part of this, an order was placed with Bombardier for 111 electric multiple units that were members of the recently launched Aventra family. The order was financed by the rolling stock company Angel Trains, with an estimated cost of around £890 million. These new trains were designated as the Class 720 and were originally planned to be divided into two sub-classes; 89 five-carriage 720/5 units and 22 ten-carriage 720/1 units. Ten-carriage units were designed to maximise capacity for peak-time trains into Liverpool Street.

During October 2020, Greater Anglia amended its order to convert all 22 ten-car units into a further 44 five-car units, stating that this delivered increased flexibility within the originally-ordered total of 665 vehicles.

The Class 720 is a replacement for a diverse range of units, including the Class 317 and Class 321 units, together with the more modern Class 360 and Class 379 fleets that have long been used on outer-suburban services on the West Anglia and Great Eastern Main Lines. The Class 720s were constructed at Bombardier's Derby Litchurch Lane Works. The introduction of the fleet has been accompanied by a roughly £300 million investment in new and refurbished infrastructure, affecting depots, sidings, and stations, to best accommodate the new trains.

=== c2c ===
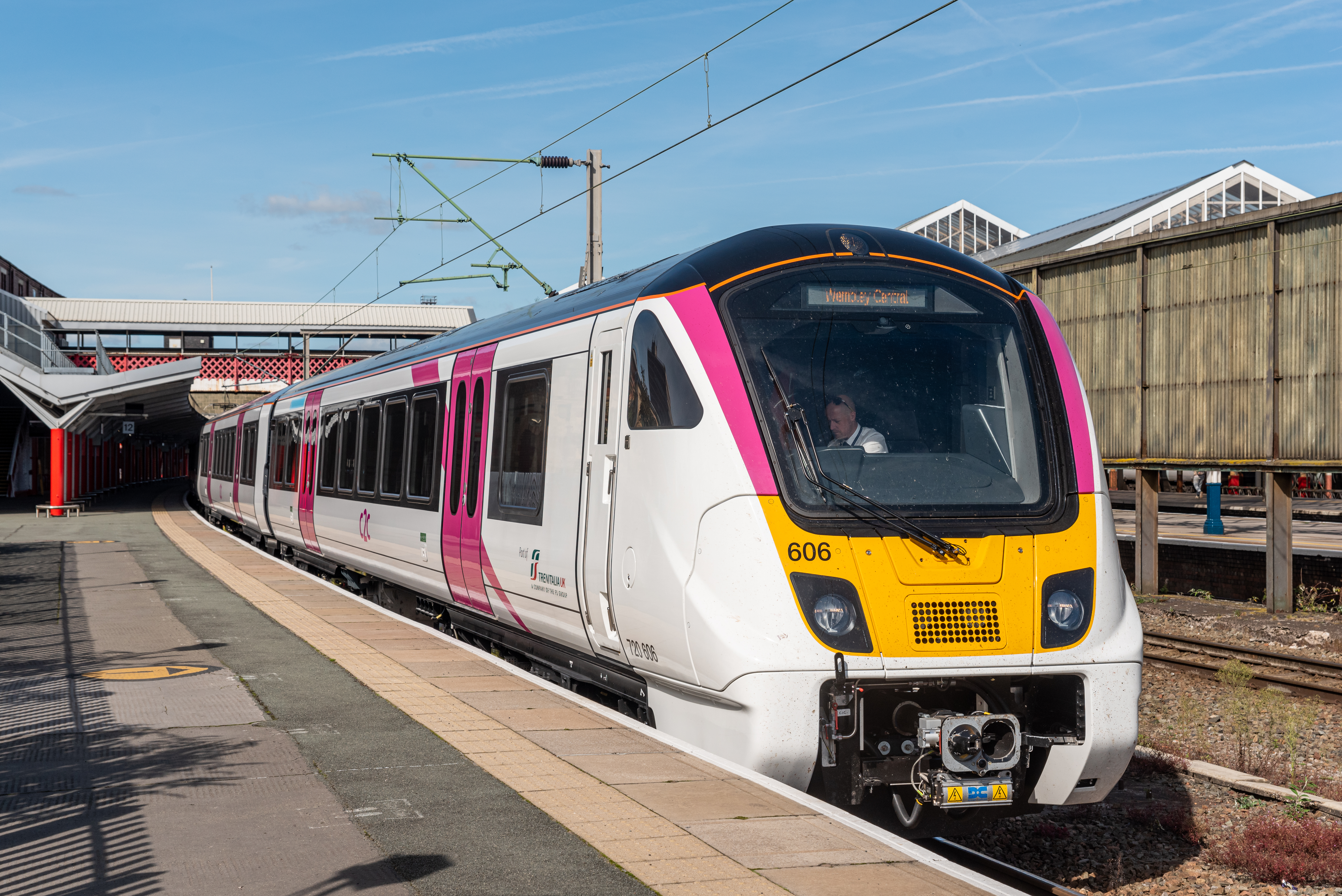
Class 720 c2c being tested at Crewe

In December 2017, c2c announced it had reached an agreement with rolling stock financiers Porterbrook and manufacturer Bombardier to procure 60 vehicles of the latter's Aventra family at a cost of £105 million. Six 10-car trains were ordered, with entry into service planned for 2021. In May 2021, the order was subsequently amended to comprise twelve 5-car trains. These were numbered in subclass 720/6, following an earlier expectation that they would be designated Class 711.

These new units would replace c2c's six four-car Class 387 units, which c2c was operating on a short-term lease from Porterbrook.

== Operation ==
=== Greater Anglia ===
Production of the first unit for Greater Anglia began in February 2018 and was completed in September 2018. Early on, it had been intended for the type to enter service during 2019, but the fleet's introduction had to postponed into the following year due to software issues with the onboard Train Control Management System (TCMS). Testing of the first unit commenced on 17 March 2020, on the London Liverpool Street to Southend line.

Both the testing and production programmes were impacted by the COVID-19 pandemic that took hold during 2020. On 8 June 2020, operational use of the Class 720 was formally authorised by the Office of Rail and Road (ORR).

On 26 November 2020, the first two units started passenger service on the London Liverpool Street to Southend line. On 16 December 2020, they started service on the Braintree branch, and on 23 December 2020, the Class 720s were rolled out on Southminster services.

In February 2021, it was reported that driver training had begun for their introduction to the Cambridge route. That same month, Ian McConnell, Greater Anglia's franchise and programmes director, noted that the Class 720 was already running relatively well and free of any meaningful technical issues, with challenges with the onboard software issues being the chief concern with the type's deployment at that point.

According to railway industry periodical Rail Engineer, Greater Anglia intend to gradually extend the new fleet's usage to eventually cover all of the Great Eastern routes in Essex and through to Ipswich during the first half of 2021, while the Class 720 would be introduced to the west Anglia route between Liverpool Street and Cambridge in the second half of the year.

On 23 March 2021, the 720s were introduced on the Liverpool Street to Clacton, Colchester Town and Ipswich services. On 25 August 2021, Class 720s entered service on the West Anglia mainline and Hertford East branch. On 13 September 2021, the 720s started services to Harwich Town and Walton-on-the-Naze.

By April 2023, the fleet had replaced a wide number of trains used on suburban routes, with the final 720 being delivered in spring 2025.

=== c2c ===
Class 720s for c2c were planned to enter service in 2021, however construction delays due to "technical challenges" meant that the first train was not delivered until April 2022.

On 6 October 2022, the Southend Echo quoted a c2c spokesperson as saying "trains are currently undergoing rigorous testing. We will update our customers as soon as we have more information as to when they will be entering passenger service”. In March 2023, c2c's managing director confirmed in an interview that it was planned that the Class 720s would enter service later that year.

On 2 June 2023, it was reported that the new trains would come into passenger service in September. The first c2c 720s duly entered service on 27 September 2023. By summer 2024, all c2c 720s had entered service. The new trains have been praised by local commuters.

== Accidents ==
On 14 August 2026, unit 720131, coupled with 720508, on the 13:51 Southend Victoria to London Liverpool Street service, partially derailed for a distance of some 1.5 miles on the Southern approach to of Wickford at 14:12 BST. This happened less than 24 hours after the Lewes derailment in East Sussex. RAIB opened an investigation into this incident.

== Fleet details ==
The units resemble the Class 345 and Class 710 built for Crossrail and London Overground respectively. However, owing to the services that they operate, the Class 720s have a higher top speed of 100 mph (161 km/h), and have significantly more seats per carriage (and less standing space).

Greater Anglia's fleet of 133 units is maintained by Alstom at the Ilford Depot.

Subclass	Operator	Qty.	Year built	Cars per unit	Unit nos.
720/1	Greater Anglia	44	2018–2024	5	720101–720144
720/5	Greater Anglia	89	2018–2024	5	720501–720589
720/6	c2c	12	2022	5	720601–720612

== Named units ==
The following units have received special liveries or names.

Greater Anglia Class 720 units with special names or liveries
Unit number	Name	Notes
Named trains
Special liveries
720110		Celebrating Black History
720506		Pride Livery

c2c Class 720 units with special names or liveries
Unit number	Name	Notes
Named trains
720601	Julian Drury c2c Managing Director 2008-2020	
