= Southminster railway station =

Eastern terminus of the Crouch Valley Line in Essex, England

Southminster
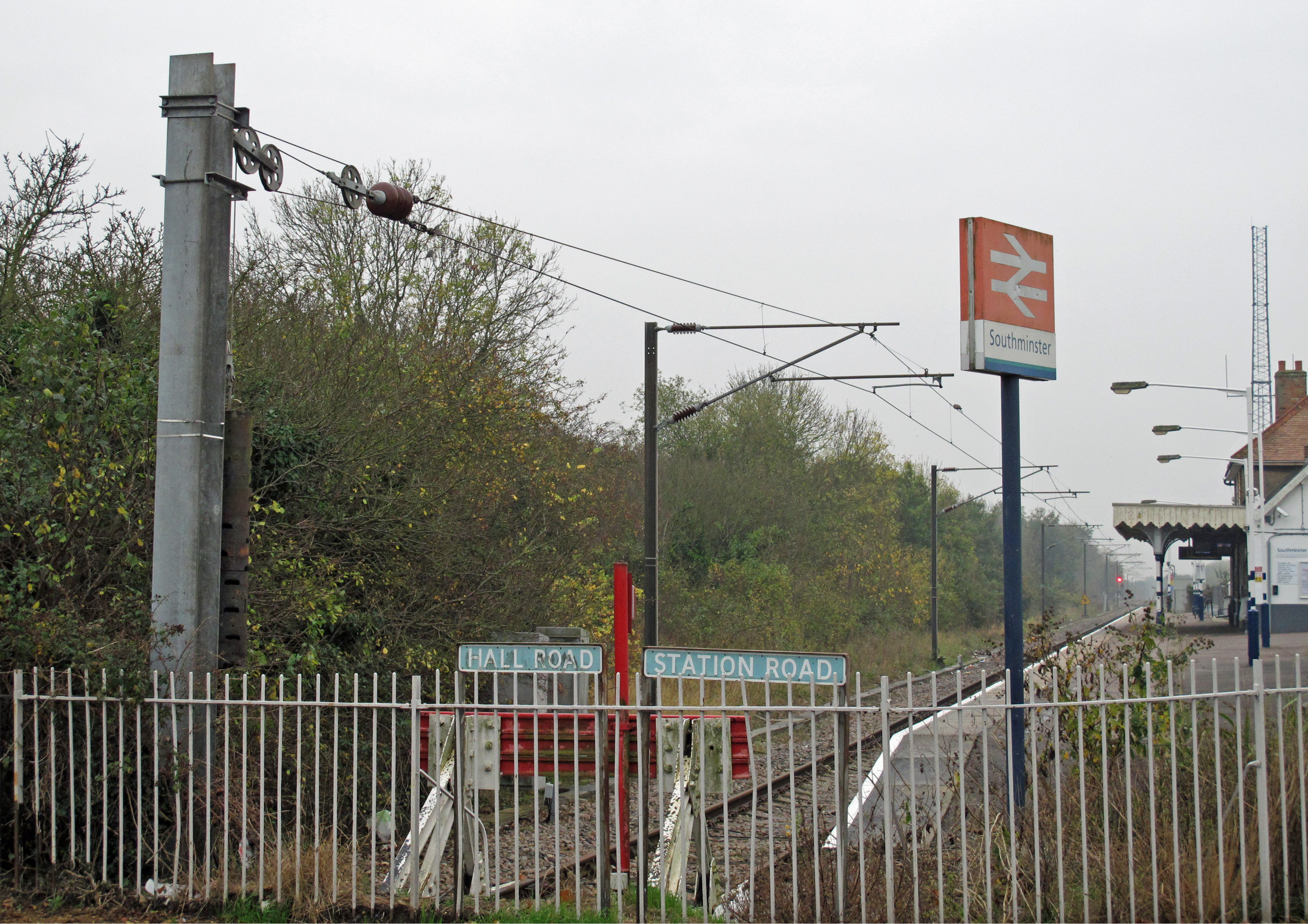
- The terminus in 2011

General information
- Location: Southminster, Maldon; England
- Coordinates: 51.66006°N 0.83386°E
- Grid reference: TQ961995
- Managed by: Greater Anglia
- Platforms: 1

Other information
- Station code: SMN
- Classification: DfT category F1

History
- Opened: 1 July 1889

Passengers
- 2020/21: ▼18,520
- 2021/22: ▲71,102
- 2022/23: ▲78,294
- 2023/24: ▲85,992
- 2024/25: ▲93,504
Location
Notes
- Passenger statistics from the Office of Rail and Road

Southminster railway station is the eastern terminus of the Crouch Valley Line in Essex, England; it serves the town of Southminster and other settlements on the Dengie Peninsula. It is 45 miles 42 chains (73.27 km) down the line from London Liverpool Street. The station is managed by Greater Anglia, which operates all services. The Engineer's Line Reference for the line is WIS and the station's three-letter station code is SMN. The platform has an operational length for 8 carriages. The preceding station to the west is Burnham-on-Crouch.

== History ==
The line and station were opened on 1 June 1889 for goods and on 1 July 1889 for passengers by the Great Eastern Railway in 1889. The station had a single platform and station buildings. There were extensive sidings, including a line to gravel pits which operated until 3 November 1979. The sidings included a goods shed, cattle pens and a locomotive turntable.

The station was host to a LNER camping coach from 1935 to 1939 and possibly one for part of 1934. The goods yard closed on 4 October 1965; there was a 36-lever signal box, which closed on 19 January 1986. The line and station were passed to the London and North Eastern Railway following the Grouping of 1923. It then passed to the Eastern Region of British Railways upon nationalisation in 1948.

The Wickford to Southminster line was electrified using 25kV overhead line electrification on 12 May 1986.

When sectorisation was introduced, Southminster was managed by Network SouthEast until the privatisation of British Rail.

== Service ==
The typical off-peak service is of one train every 40 minutes to Wickford, with additional services at peak times. Some peak services continue to or from Shenfield and/or London Liverpool Street, via the Great Eastern Main Line. On Sundays, the service reduces to hourly.

Preceding station	National Rail	Following station
Burnham-on-Crouch	Greater Anglia Crouch Valley line	Terminus
