= Rochford railway station =

Railway station in Essex, England

Coordinates: 51.582°N 0.702°E

Rochford
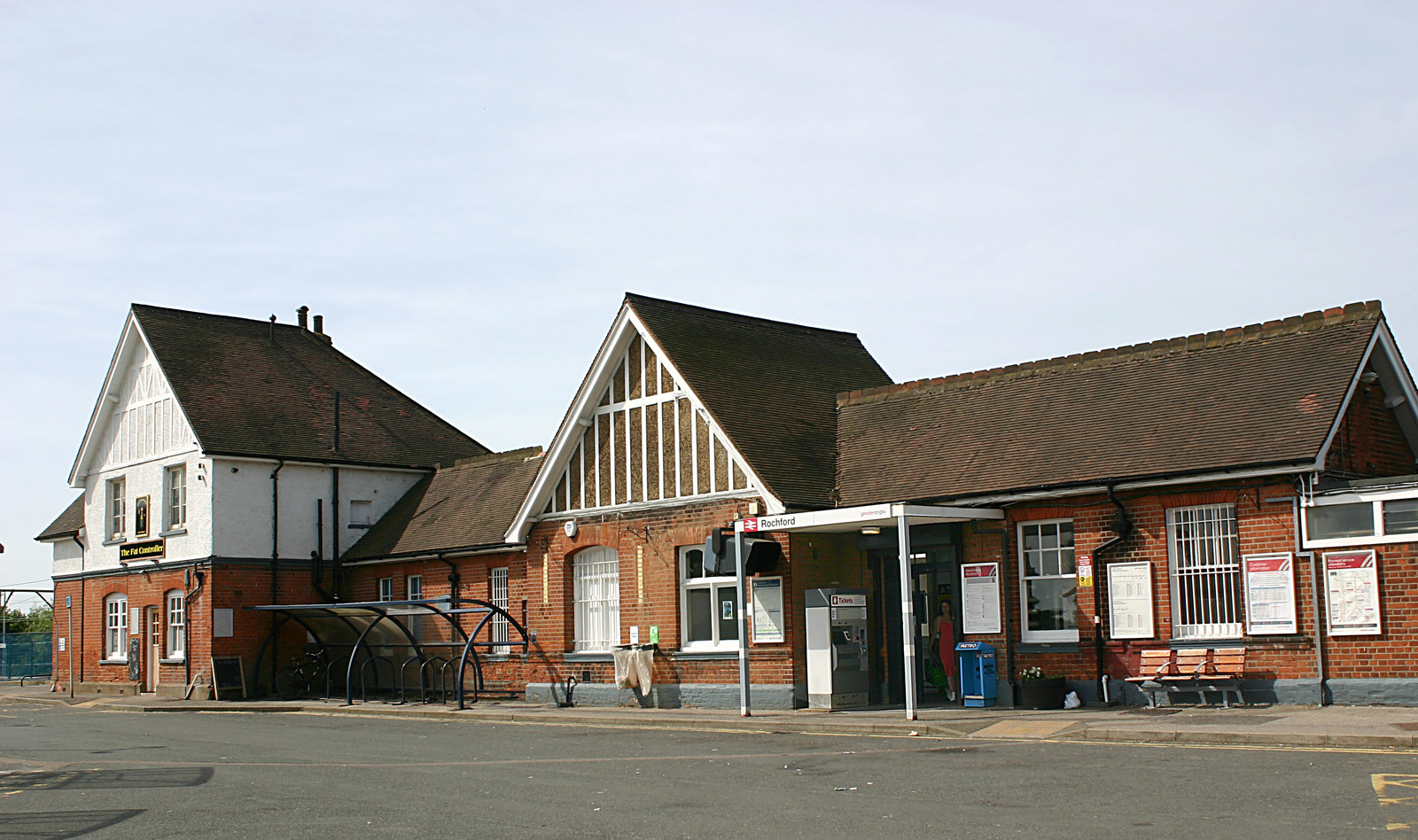
- The station in 2018

General information
- Location: Rochford, Rochford; England
- Grid reference: TQ873904
- Managed by: Greater Anglia
- Platforms: 2

Other information
- Station code: RFD
- Classification: DfT category C2

History
- Original company: Great Eastern Railway
- Pre-grouping: Great Eastern Railway
- Post-grouping: London and North Eastern Railway

Key dates
- 1 October 1889: Station opened

Passengers
- 2020/21: ▼0.190 million
- 2021/22: ▲0.458 million
- 2022/23: ▲0.575 million
- 2023/24: ▲0.634 million
- 2024/25: ▲0.671 million
Location
Notes
- Passenger statistics from the Office of Rail and Road

Rochford railway station is on the Shenfield to Southend Line in the East of England, serving the town of Rochford, Essex. It is 38 miles 54 chains (62.24 km) down the line from London Liverpool Street and is situated between Hockley and Southend Airport stations. It is managed by Greater Anglia, who operate all services.

== History ==
The line from Wickford to Southend (including Rochford station) was opened on 1 October 1889. There was formerly a signal box at the station, this was decommissioned in 1938 with the introduction of colour light signalling. There was a goods yard on the west side of the station, it was closed on 5 June 1967. Electrification of the Shenfield to Southend Victoria line using 1.5 kV DC overhead line electrification (OLE) was completed on 31 December 1956. This was changed to 6.25 kV AC in November 1960 and to 25 kV AC on 25 January 1979.

== Facilities ==
The station has a car park and cycle storage, a ticket machine and ticket office, a waiting room, a cafe, and live departure screens.

== Passenger volume ==
Passenger volume at Rochford
	2004–05	2005–06	2006–07	2007–08	2008–09	2009–10	2010–11	2011–12	2012–13	2013–14	2014–15	2015–16	2016–17	2017–18	2018–19	2019–20	2020–21	2021–22	2022–23	2023–24	2024–25
Entries and exits	461,413	513,118	458,758	440,288	462,680	432,474	438,818	409,462	424,448	438,494	700,214	596,634	566,656	483,300	615,582	597,582	189,916	458,118	574,674	633,798	671,248

The statistics cover twelve month periods that start in April.

== Services ==
Rochford was formerly the closest railway station to Southend Airport until the airport's own dedicated station opened in 2011.

The typical off-peak service is of three trains per hour to Southend Victoria and three to Liverpool Street (services join the Great Eastern Main Line for London at Shenfield).

Preceding station	National Rail	Following station
Hockley	Greater Anglia; Shenfield–Southend line	Southend Airport

== Community rail ==
The station, as with all stations on the line, is part of the Essex & South Suffolk Community Rail Partnership.
