= Rayleigh railway station =

Railway station in Essex, England

Rayleigh (RLG)
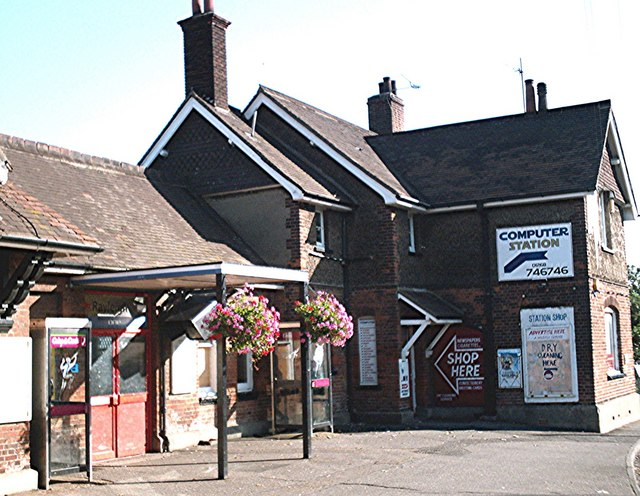
- Rayleigh station in 2006

General information
- Location: Rayleigh, District of Rochford, England
- Coordinates: 51.589°N 0.601°E
- Grid reference: TQ802910
- Manager: Greater Anglia
- Platforms: 2

Other information
- Station code: RLG
- Classification: DfT category C2

History
- Opened: 1 October 1889

Passengers
- 2020/21: ▼0.352 million
- 2021/22: ▲1.028 million
- 2022/23: ▲1.332 million
- 2023/24: ▲1.504 million
- 2024/25: ▲1.553 million
Location
Notes
- Passenger statistics from the Office of Rail and Road

Rayleigh railway station is on the Shenfield to Southend Line in the East of England, serving the town of Rayleigh, in Essex. It lies 33 miles 9 chains (53.29 km) down the line from London Liverpool Street, and is situated between Wickford to the west and Hockley to the east. It is managed by Greater Anglia, who operate all services.

== History ==
The line from Wickford to Southend, including Rayleigh station was opened on 1 October 1889, by the Great Eastern Railway. There was a goods yard to the west of the station, on the 'up' (London-bound) side, including a goods shed and cattle pens. There was a signal box on the 'down' platform, which was closed in 1938 with the introduction of colour light signalling. Overhead electrification of the Shenfield–Southend line at 1.5 kV DC was completed on 31 December 1956; that was changed to 6.25 kV AC in November 1960 and to 25 kV AC in January 1979.

To the west of the station, there was a private halt called Bridge 774, which was used from May 1922 to April 1925 during construction work on the Southend Arterial Road. To the east, there was a siding called Downhall, associated with a brickworks which had been decommissioned by 1968.

== Facilities ==
It is a small station with a ticket office, although access to the platforms is available when it is closed through a gate to the left of the building. Outside the station, there is a taxi rank, a car park, bus stops and a newsagent.

== Passenger volume ==
Passenger volume at Rayleigh
	2004–05	2005–06	2006–07	2007–08	2008–09	2009–10	2010–11	2011–12	2012–13	2013–14	2014–15	2015–16	2016–17	2017–18	2018–19	2019–20	2020–21	2021–22	2022–23	2023–24	2024–25
Entries and exits	1,903,443	1,649,475	924,509	930,096	952,914	877,142	920,500	935,328	978,788	1,035,008	1,864,064	1,949,600	1,819,832	1,310,666	1,832,722	1,660,412	352,356	1,027,610	1,332,392	1,504,388	1,552,860

The statistics cover twelve month periods that start in April.

== Service ==
Greater Anglia operates all trains serving the station.

The typical weekday off-peak service is three trains per hour in each direction between Southend Victoria and London Liverpool Street; services join the Great Eastern Main Line at Shenfield. At peak times, service frequencies are increased and calling patterns more varied.

Preceding station	National Rail	Following station
Wickford	Greater Anglia; Shenfield–Southend line	Hockley

== Community rail ==
The station, as with all other stations on the line, is a part of the Essex & Sourh Suffolk Community Rail Partnership.
