= Shenfield (disambiguation) =

Shenfield may refer to:

- Shenfield, Essex
  - Shenfield High School, a high school located in Shenfield, Essex.
  - Shenfield railway station, the railway station serving Shenfield, Essex.
- Lawrence L. Shenfield, advertising executive and philatelist
