= Hockley railway station (Essex) =

Railway station in Essex, England

Coordinates: 51.604°N 0.659°E

Hockley
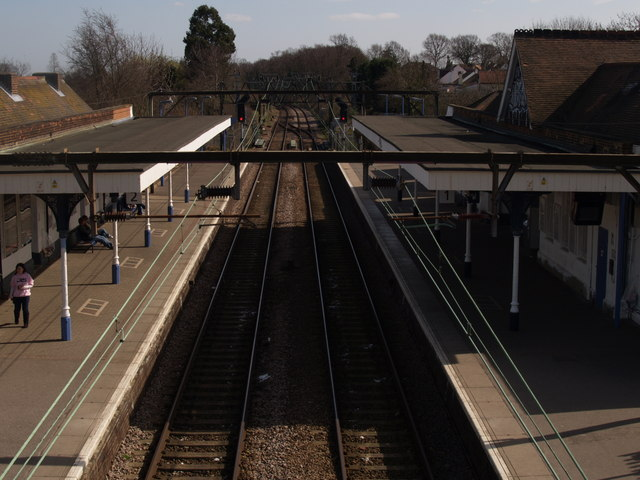
- Hockley railway station in 2009

General information
- Location: Hockley, Rochford; England
- Grid reference: TQ842927
- Managed by: Greater Anglia
- Platforms: 2

Other information
- Station code: HOC
- Classification: DfT category C2

History
- Original company: Great Eastern Railway
- Pre-grouping: Great Eastern Railway
- Post-grouping: London and North Eastern Railway

Key dates
- 1 October 1889: Station opened

Passengers
- 2020/21: ▼0.247 million
- 2021/22: ▲0.630 million
- 2022/23: ▲0.770 million
- 2023/24: ▲0.832 million
- 2024/25: ▼0.818 million
Location
Notes
- Passenger statistics from the Office of Rail and Road

Hockley railway station is on the Shenfield to Southend Line in the East of England, serving the village of Hockley, Essex. It is 36 miles 1 chain (57.96 km) down the line from London Liverpool Street and is situated between Rayleigh to the west and Rochford to the east. There are two crossovers at the east end of the station, which can be used to facilitate trains turning back if the line is blocked in either direction. It is managed by Greater Anglia, who operate all services.

== History ==
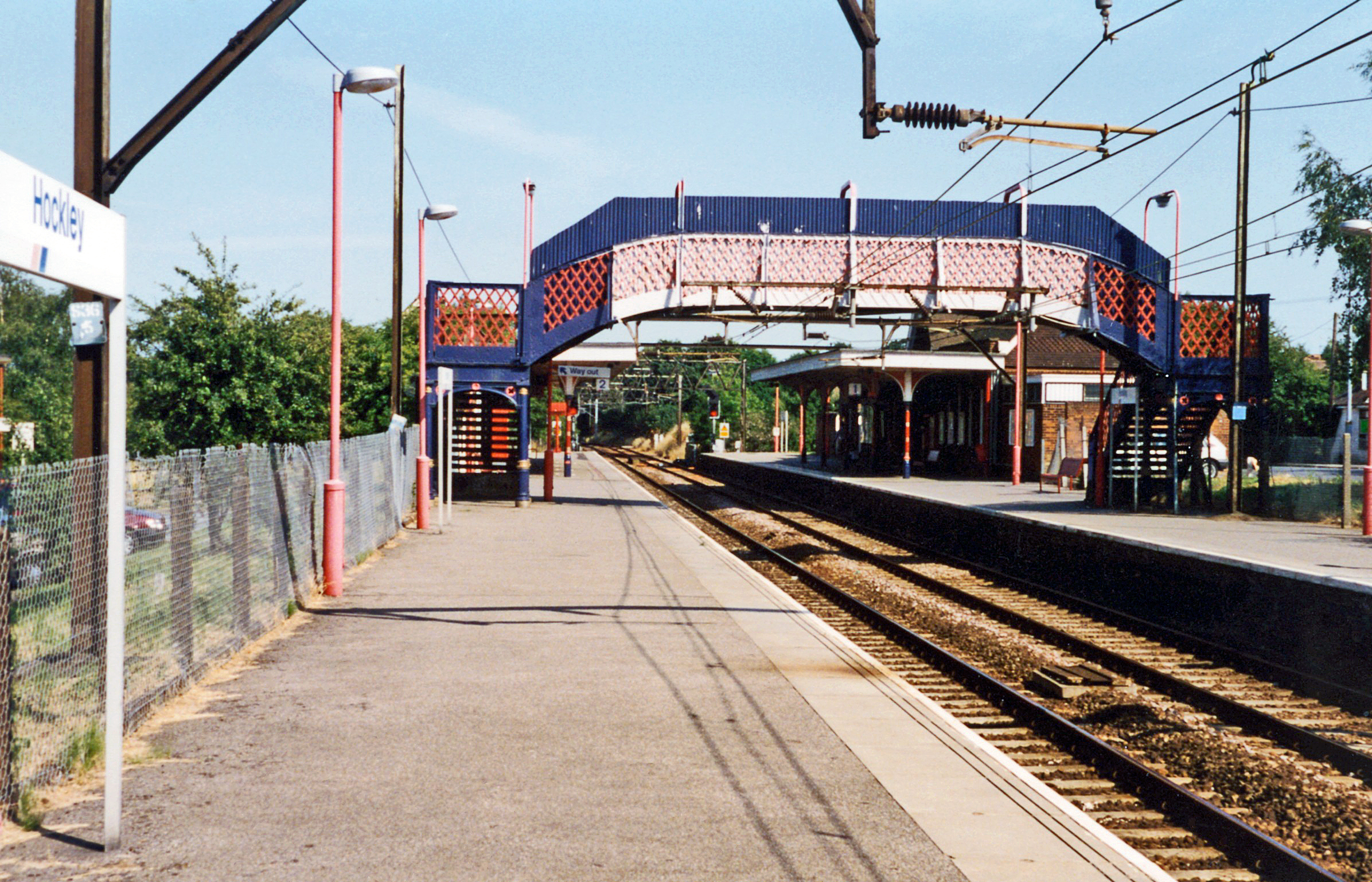
The station seen in 1995

The line from Wickford to Southend (including Hockley station) were opened on 1 October 1889. There was a signal box on the down platform, this was decommissioned in 1938 with the introduction of colour light signalling on the line between Wickford and Southend. Freight traffic ceased on 5 June 1967.

Electrification of the Shenfield to Southend Victoria line using 1.5 kV DC overhead line electrification (OLE) was completed on 31 December 1956. This was changed to 6.25 kV AC in November 1960 and to 25 kV AC in January 1979.

== Facilities ==
The station has a car park and cycle storage, a ticket machine and ticket office, a waiting room, a coffee stand, and live departure screens.

== Passenger volume ==
Passenger volume at Hockley
	2004–05	2005–06	2006–07	2007–08	2008–09	2009–10	2010–11	2011–12	2012–13	2013–14	2014–15	2015–16	2016–17	2017–18	2018–19	2019–20	2020–21	2021–22	2022–23	2023–24	2024–25
Entries and exits	968,747	930,154	591,757	530,923	545,868	537,712	541,328	523,382	556,714	590,514	968,690	1,034,488	960,116	718,932	724,288	978,212	247,272	630,040	770,184	831,862	818,190

The statistics cover twelve month periods that start in April.

== Services ==
The station is currently managed by Greater Anglia, which also operates all trains serving it. The typical off-peak service is of three trains per hour to Southend Victoria and three to Liverpool Street (services join the Great Eastern Main Line for London at Shenfield).

Preceding station	National Rail	Following station
Rayleigh	Greater Anglia; Shenfield–Southend line	Rochford

== Community rail ==
The station, as with all stations on the line, is part of the Essex & South Suffolk Community Rail Partnership.
