= Southend Airport railway station =

Railway station in Essex, England

Southend Airport
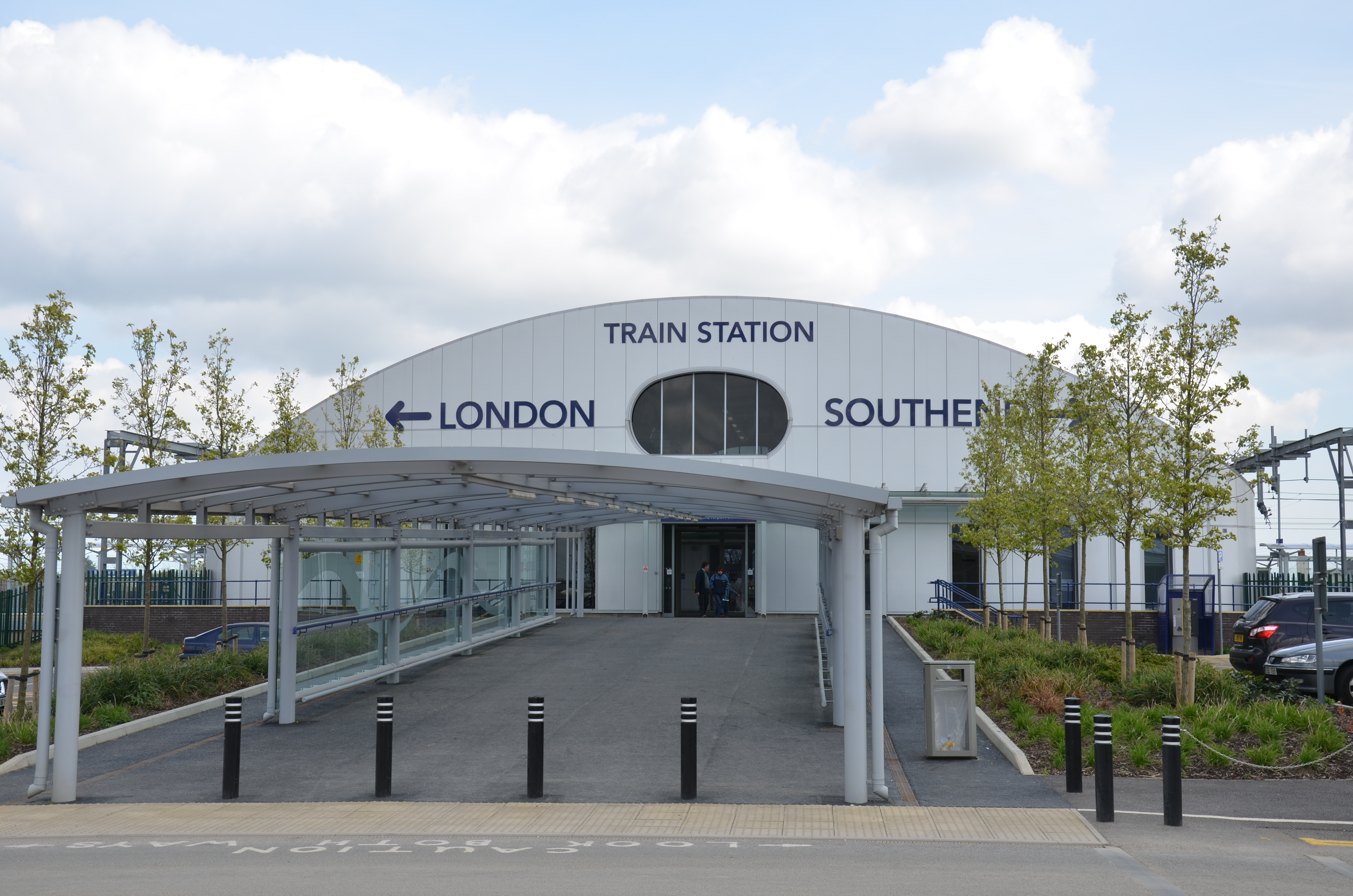
- The station in 2012

General information
- Location: London Southend Airport, Rochford; England
- Coordinates: 51.5687°N 0.7052°E
- Grid reference: TQ875890
- Manager: London Southend Airport
- Platforms: 2

Other information
- Station code: SIA

Key dates
- 18 July 2011: Opened

Passengers
- 2021/22: ▲0.126 million
- 2022/23: ▲0.141 million
- 2023/24: ▲0.188 million
- 2024/25: ▲0.232 million
- 2025/26: ▲0.331 million
Location
Notes
- Passenger statistics from the Office of Rail and Road

Southend Airport railway station is a stop on the Shenfield to Southend Line in the East of England; it serves London Southend Airport, the village of Sutton and northern parts of Southend-on-Sea, Essex. It is 39 miles 44 chains (63.65 km) down the line from London Liverpool Street and is situated between Rochford and Prittlewell. Train services provide an airport rail link between Southend Airport and Central London.

The station is managed by London Southend Airport but the trains serving it are operated by Greater Anglia.

== History ==
For the first 75 years of the airport's operation, the nearest railway station was Rochford. After Southend Borough Council sold the airport to Regional Airports Ltd, a scheme was proposed in 1997 to build a station; planning permission was obtained from Rochford District Council. It was not until 2008 that the Stobart group began to advance the project and construction began in late 2009. In June 2011, National Express East Anglia trains began stopping at the station, but passengers were initially not permitted to get off.

The station was designed by Atkins and constructed by Birse Rail; it was opened by then-Transport Minister Theresa Villiers in 2011.

Glyn Jones, chief executive of Stobart Aviation, proposed in 2018 that Crossrail should be extended to Southend Airport to alleviate capacity problems at Heathrow.

== Facilities ==
The station has a ticket office and ticket machines, two car parks, cycle spaces, toilets and live departure screens.

== Passenger volume ==
Passenger volume at Southend Airport
	2011–12	2012–13	2013–14	2014–15	2015–16	2016–17	2017–18	2018–19	2019–20	2020–21	2021–22	2022–23	2023–24	2024–25
Entries and exits	57,208	340,814	408,430	520,734	425,160	395,646	466,510	611,256	757,058	64,524	126,090	141,358	187,966	231,806

The statistics cover twelve-month periods that start in April.

== Services ==
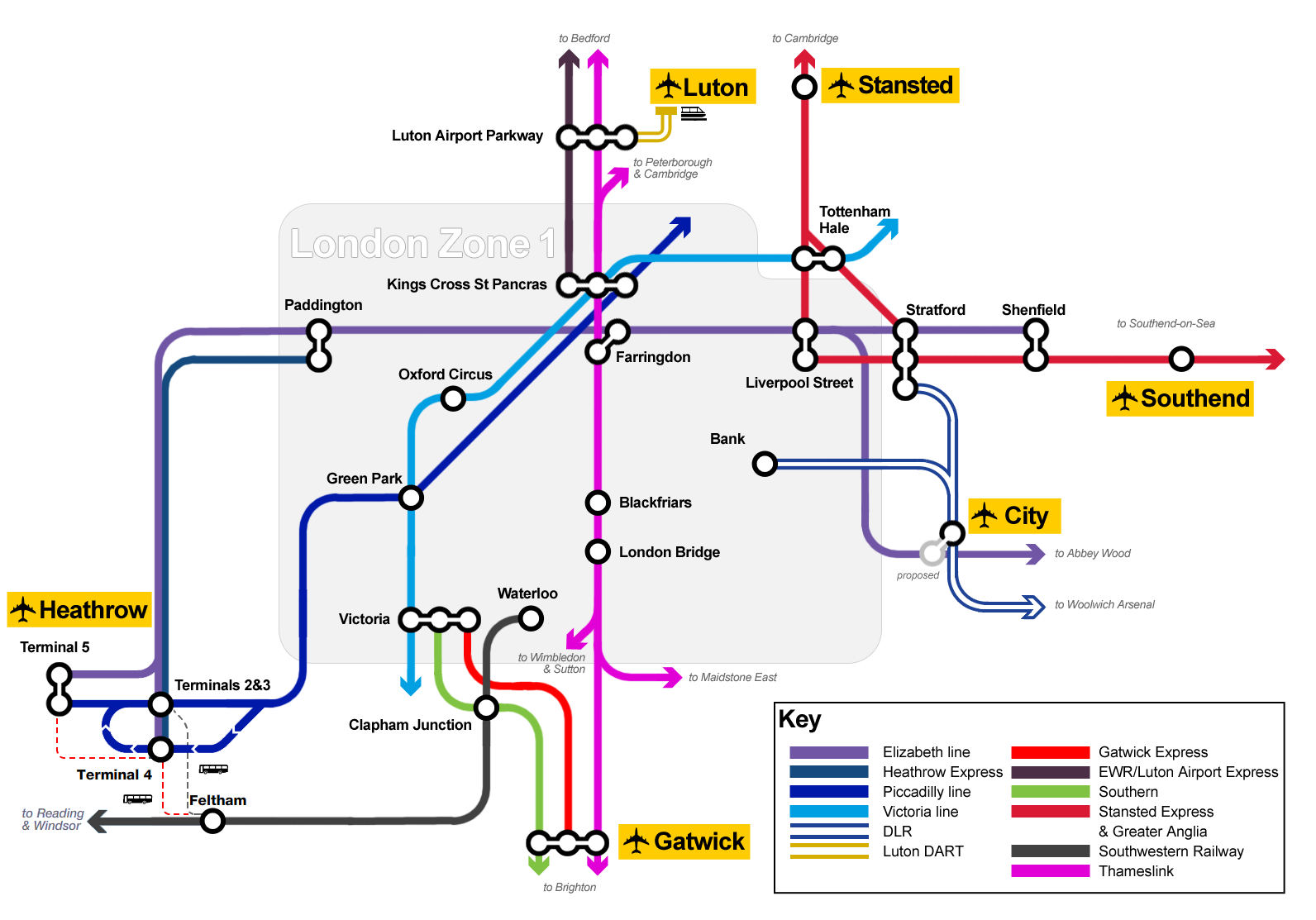
Map of London airport Tube and rail connections

The typical Monday–Saturday off-peak service in trains per hour (tph) is:

- 3 tph to London Liverpool Street, calling at all stations to Shenfield and then Stratford (one calls additionally at Romford);
- 3 tph to Southend Victoria, calling at Prittlewell.

On Sunday, the service reduces to two trains per hour in each direction.

Preceding station	National Rail	Following station
Rochford	Greater Anglia; Shenfield–Southend line	Prittlewell

== Community rail ==
The station, as with all stations on the line, is part of the Essex & South Suffolk Community Rail Partnership.
