= Article 14 =

Article 14 may refer to:

- Article 14 Direction, in British planning law
- Article 14 of the Constitution of India
- Article 14 of the Constitution of Singapore
- Article 14 of the European Convention on Human Rights
- Article 14, a compilation album by Irregular Records
