= Anthony Hillary =

English cricketer

Personal information
- Full name: Anthony Aylmer Hillary
- Born: 28 August 1926; Shenfield, Essex, England
- Died: 20 June 1991 (aged 64); Truro, Cornwall, England
- Batting: Right-handed
- Bowling: Right-arm off break

Domestic team information
- Years: Team
- 1954–1962: Berkshire
- 1951: Cambridge University

Career statistics
Competition	First-class
Matches	1
Runs scored	49
Batting average	49.00
100s/50s	–/–
Top score	49
Balls bowled	–
Wickets	–
Bowling average	–
5 wickets in innings	–
10 wickets in match	–
Best bowling	–
Catches/stumpings	–/–
- Source: Cricinfo, 8 November 2013

Anthony Aylmer Hillary (28 August 1926 – 20 June 1991), known as Tony Hillary, was an English cricketer. Hillary was a right-handed batsman who bowled right-arm off break.

Born at Shenfield, Essex, Hillary studied at the University of Cambridge, while there he played a single first-class cricket match for the university cricket club against Sussex at Fenner's in 1951. In a match which ended as a draw, Hillary batted once, scoring 49 runs in Cambridge University's first-innings before being dismissed by James Langridge. He later played minor counties cricket for Berkshire, debuting in the 1954 Minor Counties Championship against Cornwall. He played minor counties cricket for Berkshire until 1962, making 67 appearances.

Outside of cricket, Hillary was a history teacher at Abingdon School from 1952 to 1988. He died at Truro, Cornwall on 20 June 1991.
