= London Southend Airport =

Airport in Southend-on-Sea, England

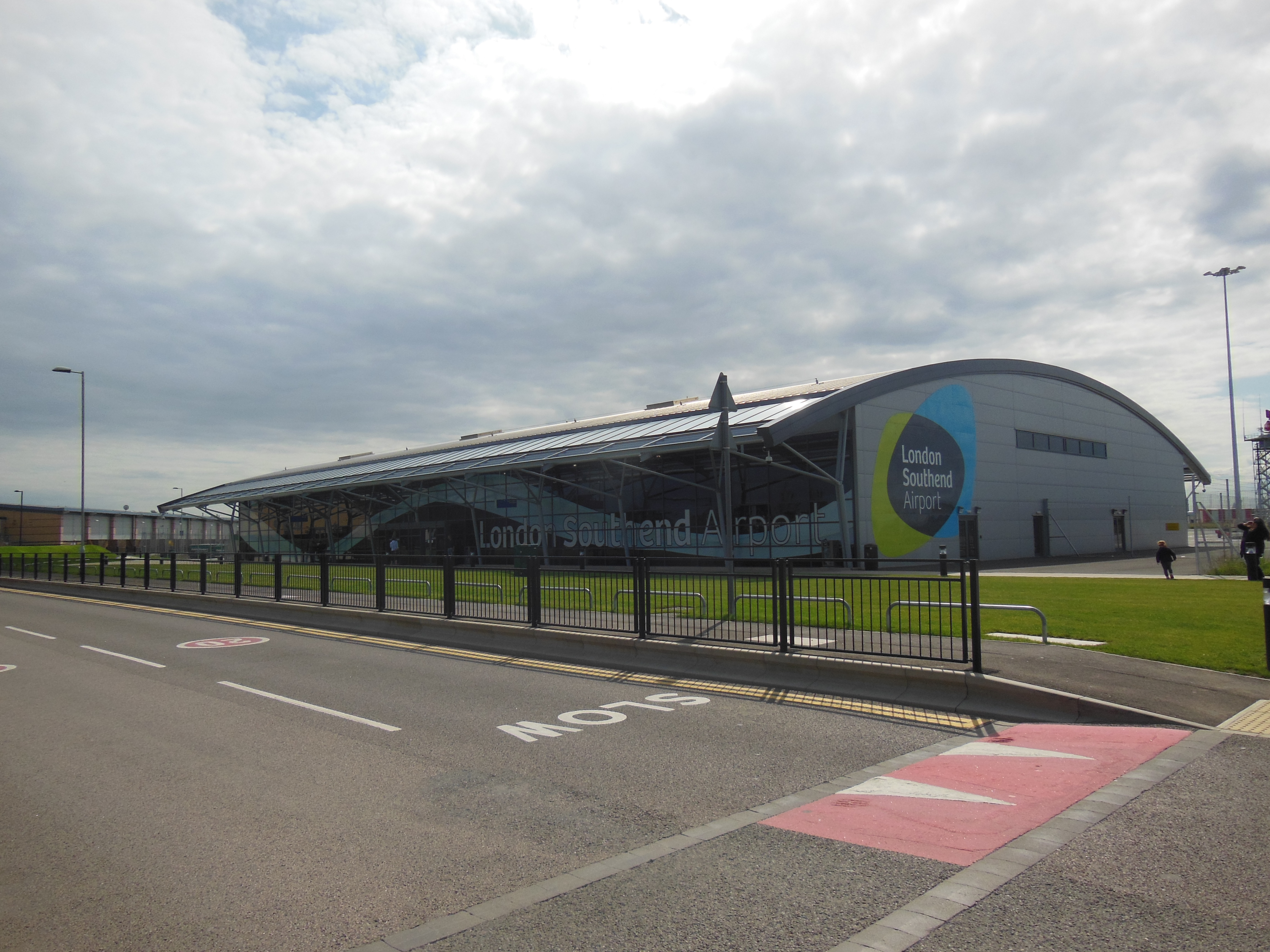
- IATA: SEN; ICAO: EGMC

Summary
- Airport type: Public
- Owner: Carlyle Group (83%); Esken (17%)
- Serves: London
- Location: Southend-on-Sea and Rochford, Essex, England
- Opened: 1935; 91 years ago
- Operating base for: easyJet
- Built: 1914; 112 years ago
- Elevation AMSL: 55 ft (17 m)
- Coordinates: 51°34′13″N 000°41′36″E
- Website: londonsouthendairport.com

Map
- Location in Essex SEN / EGMC (England)

Runways
Direction	Length		Surface
Direction	m	ft	Surface
05/23	1,856	6,089	Asphalt

Statistics (2025)
- Passengers: 719,513
- Passenger change 24-25: ▲150%
- Aircraft movements: 30,728
- Movements change 24-25: ▲13%
- Sources: UK AIP at NATS; Statistics from the UK Civil Aviation Authority

London Southend Airport (IATA: SEN, ICAO: EGMC) is an international airport situated on the outskirts of Southend-on-Sea in Essex, England, approximately 35 miles (56 km) south east of London The airport straddles the boundary between the city of Southend-on-Sea and the Rochford District.

Southend was the UK's third-busiest airport during the 1960s, behind Heathrow and Manchester, before passenger numbers dropped off in the 1970s. Following its purchase by Stobart Group in 2008, a development programme provided a new terminal and control tower, extended the runway, and opened Southend Airport railway station on the Shenfield-Southend line, which provides a connection to Central London via a regular rail service between London Liverpool Street and Southend Victoria.

== Overview ==
=== Description ===
The airport is located between Southend-on-Sea and Rochford, about 2 miles (3 km) north of Southend, in the county of Essex, 36 miles (58 km) east of central London. It has a single 1,856 m-long (6,089 ft) asphalt runway on a south-west/north-east axis.

The current passenger terminal, built in 2012, has the capacity to serve five to six million passengers per year. As of 2025, the former terminal is managed by the London Southend Jet Centre, a fixed-base operator which handles executive aircraft. A Holiday Inn hotel adjacent to the airport entrance, owned by London Southend Airport, opened in 2012.

London Southend was voted the best airport in Britain for three consecutive years by consumer group Which? in 2013, 2014 and 2015. It won "best London airport" for six consecutive years between 2013–2019. In the years the airport did not rank number one it has typically scored well.

The airport was put up for sale by owner Esken in March 2023 following a review of the group's core businesses. In March 2024, the Carlyle Group alongside Cyrrus Capital Partners took ownership of the airport, providing up to £32 million of new investment.

=== Operations ===
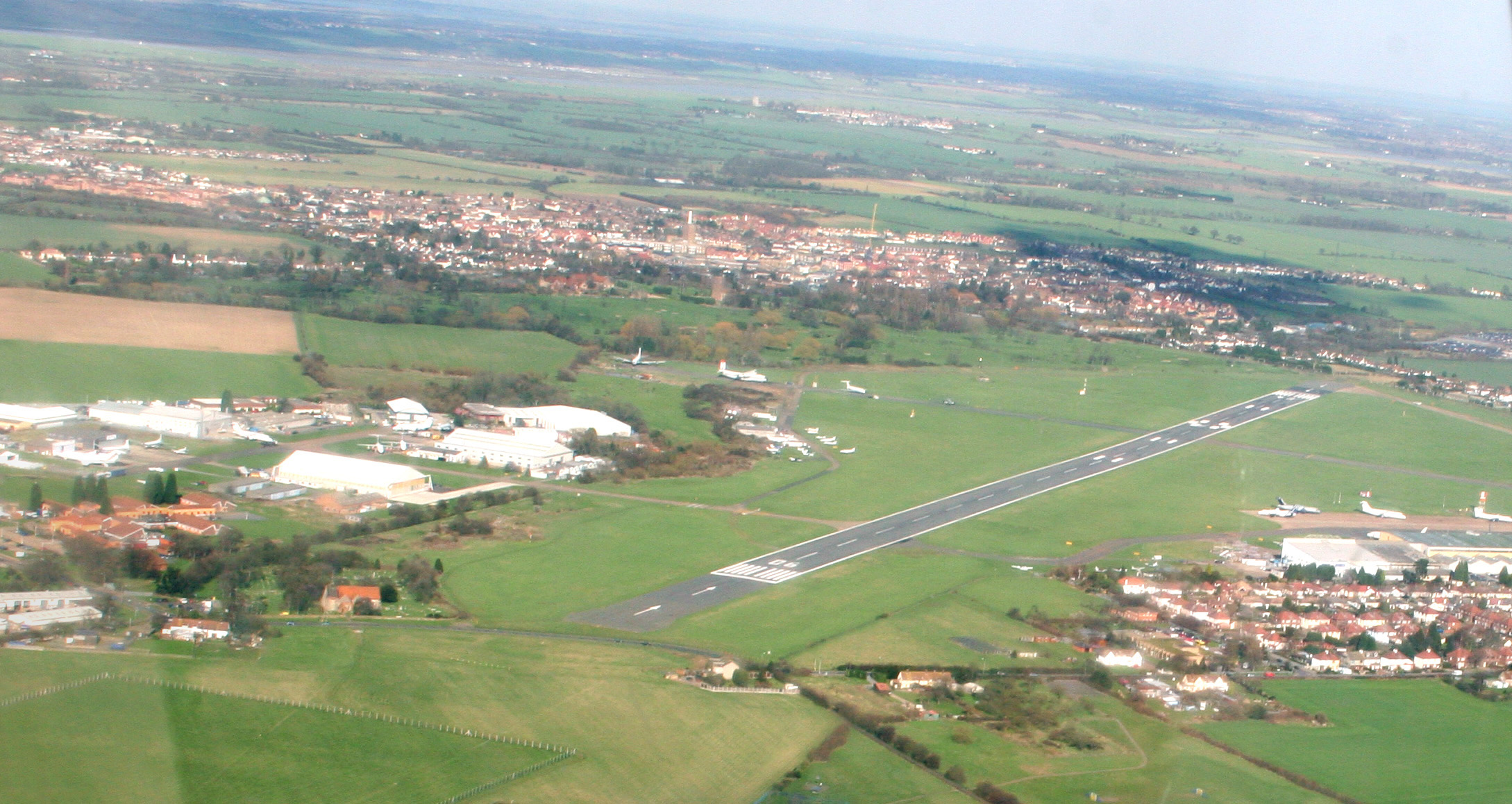
Aerial view looking north-east, prior to the construction of the runway extension

London Southend Airport mainly handles scheduled passenger, charter, cargo and business flights, alongside general aviation flying and pilot training (both fixed-wing aircraft and helicopter). The airport is run by London Southend Airport Company, which employs around 250 people. During the large 2012 airport expansion, there were over 500 more people working at the airport compared to the same time in 2011.

Southend Airport has a Civil Aviation Authority (CAA) Ordinary Licence that allows flights for the public transport of passengers or for flying instruction as authorised by the licencee.

The airport's location means it has an excellent weather record, and is used by airlines as a diversion alternative when adverse weather or incidents cause other London airports to be closed.

Airline ground handling is provided in-house by London Southend Aviation Services, while the London Southend Jet Centre handles aircraft using their services.

Companies located within the airport boundary employ around 450 workers, with businesses including aircraft maintenance, flying clubs and the airport-owned hotel. Previously British World Airlines had its head office at Viscount House at London Southend Airport.

easyJet began operating services by opening a base at Southend in April 2012, followed by Irish carrier Aer Lingus Regional began regular flights to Dublin in May, resulting in a rapid increase in airport passenger numbers during 2012, with 721,661 using the airport in that year, 969,912 in 2013 and 1,102,358 in 2014. The following year saw a decline to 900,648 and again to 874,549 in 2016, while 2017 saw passenger numbers increase more than 25% to 1,095,914. In 2011, the airport operator planned to reach passenger numbers of two million per year by 2020. In 2018, the airport saw an increase of nearly 400,000 passengers over the previous year's total, with just over 1.4 million passengers. The airport successfully reached over two million passengers in 2019, its best year to date. Since 2020 and the effect of the COVID-19 pandemic, the airport declined however is in resurgence as of 2023.

== History ==
=== Early years ===
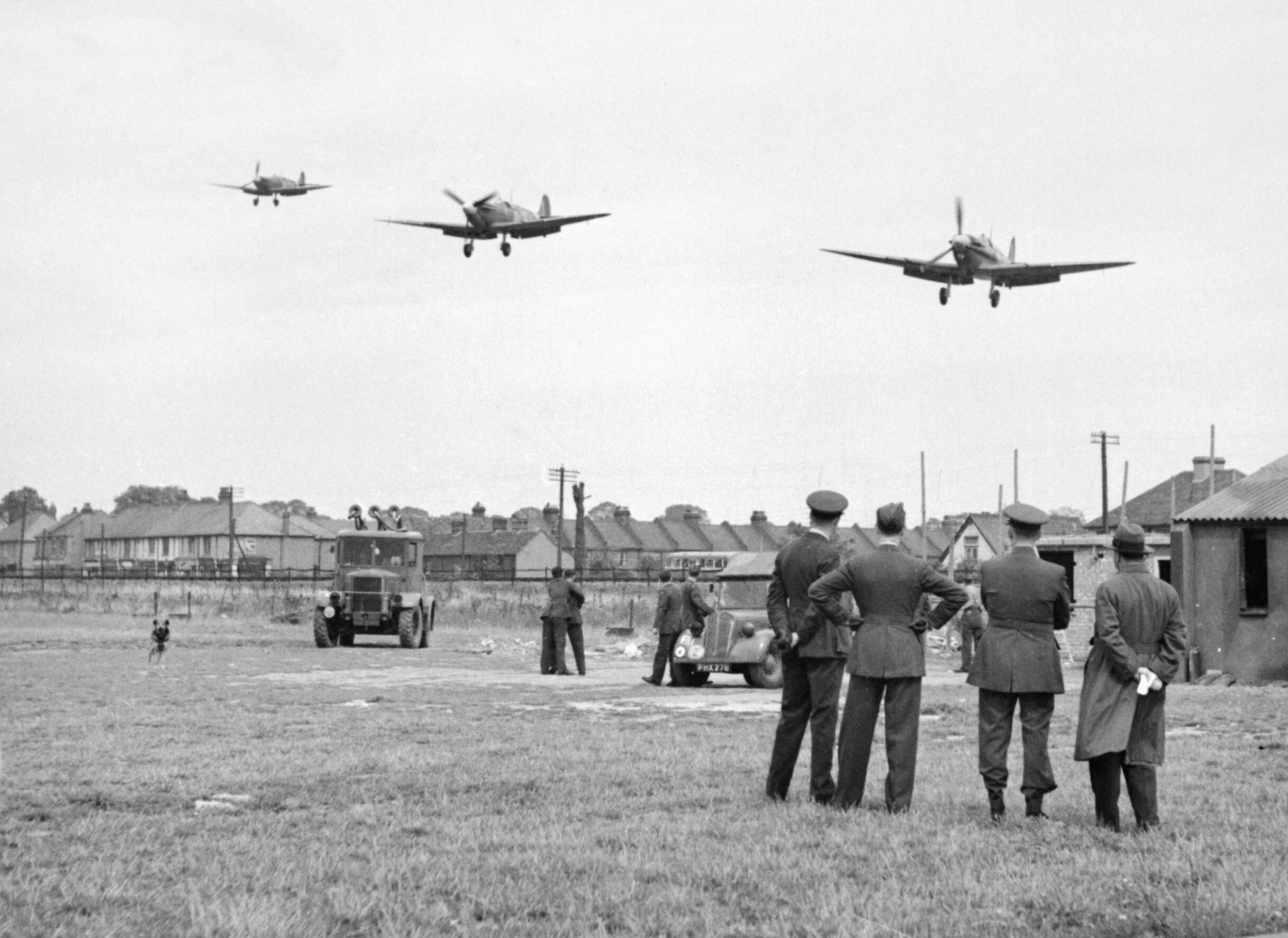
Personnel of 121 Squadron watch Supermarine Spitfires coming into land at RAF Rochford, August 1943

The airfield was established by the Royal Flying Corps during the First World War. It was the largest flying ground in Essex, with the greatest number of units. In May 1915, the Royal Navy Air Service (RNAS) took over until 4 June 1916, when it became RFC Rochford. It was designated as night fighter station and many sorties were flown against Zeppelin airship raiders, including LZ38 on 31 May 1915. Around 1919, the station closed and reverted to farmland, which it remained as until 1933 when Southend Borough Council bought the land.

The site was officially opened as a municipal airport on 18 September 1935 by the Under-Secretary of State for Air, Sir Philip Sassoon, who arrived in his de Havilland Leopard Moth.

In 1939, the Air Ministry requisitioned the airfield and it was known as RAF Rochford during the Second World War as a satellite airfield. It became a base for fighter squadrons comprising Supermarine Spitfire and Hawker Hurricane as well as Bristol Blenheim aircraft. By 28 October 1940, RAF Rochford had been renamed RAF Southend, no longer being a satellite of Hornchurch, although they still had Fighter Control at the base. A day later, 264 Squadron arrived for night fighter duties equipped with the Boulton Paul Defiant. Many of the 50 pillboxes that were designed to protect the airport from paratrooper landings still survive, as does the underground defence control room, which is near to Southend Flying Club. A further 20 or so pillboxes also remain in the surrounding countryside. Canewdon, 2 miles (3.2 km) north-east of the airport, was the location of one of the Second World War Chain Home radar stations. The 360 ft-high (110 m) transmitter tower at Canewdon was relocated to the Marconi works at Great Baddow in the 1950s.

=== Post-war ===
In the 1950s, three new runways were added, enabling commercial flights for passengers and cargo. Runway 6/24 (now runway 5/23) was extended to 1,645 m (5,397 ft) in 1960, while the third runway was removed.

During the 1960s, Southend became third busiest airport in the UK. In 1967, it served 692,686 passengers; the same year, it had its first fatal crash.

=== 1970s decline ===
At the end of February 1972, Channel Airways, which had its hub and headquarters at Southend, ceased operations.

In the 1970s, the proximity of housing on nearby roads, as well as St Laurence Church on Eastwoodbury Lane less than 100 m (330 ft) from the runway, prevented expansion. The airport's decline accelerated as jet aircraft were unable to use the runway due to its short length. As flights were withdrawn, engineering and maintenance became a more important part of airport operations.

=== 1993: Regional Airports Ltd ===
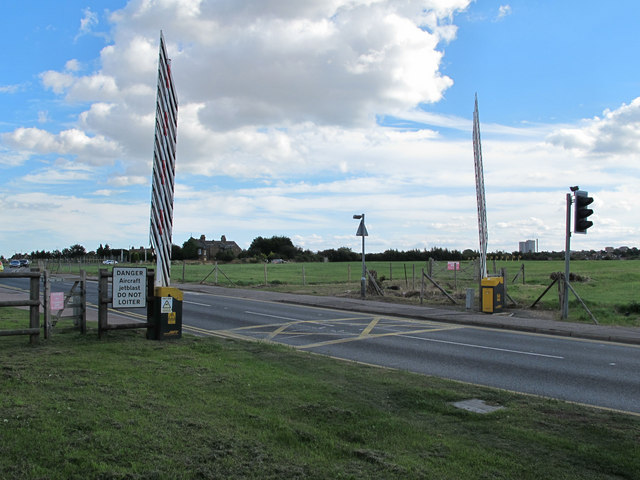
Temporary closing of barriers across Eastwoodbury Lane was required for large aircraft movements until the road was diverted to enable the construction of the runway extension in August 2012

In 1993, after the airport had been losing money for many years, Southend Borough Council sold the lease to the airport to Regional Airports Ltd. (RAL), operator of Biggin Hill Airport. London Southend Airport Co. Ltd. was formed to operate the airport which was re-branded as "London Southend Airport" with the term "Municipal" dropping from the title.

In 2001, a debate centred on the possible relocation of the Grade I listed St Laurence and All Saints Church further away from the side of the main runway. The proposal was dropped after the planning application was rejected by Southend Council in 2003, and a compromise scheme was implemented resulting in the installation of new barriers across Eastwoodbury Lane and requiring slightly shorter licensed runway lengths once safety areas had been added. These changes allowed passenger flights to be restarted, although the runway length still largely curtailed the potential range and payloads for passenger flights, and scheduled airline utilisation was low, until the March 2012 runway extension opened.

Flightline was an airline formed in 1989 headquartered at Southend, where they also had a maintenance/engineering base for their own and third party aircraft. They mainly operated British Aerospace 146 aircraft on ad-hoc charters, and an Avro RJ100 regional jet with which they operated a regular service between Southend and Cologne from 7 June 2006 to 1 December 2008 on behalf of Ford Motor Company as a corporate shuttle. Flightline went into administration on 3 December 2008.

In January 2008, Regional Airports Ltd. put the airport up for sale.

Flybe operated a once weekly summer-only service to Jersey using Dash 8 aircraft, ending in 2011.

=== 2008: Stobart Group ===
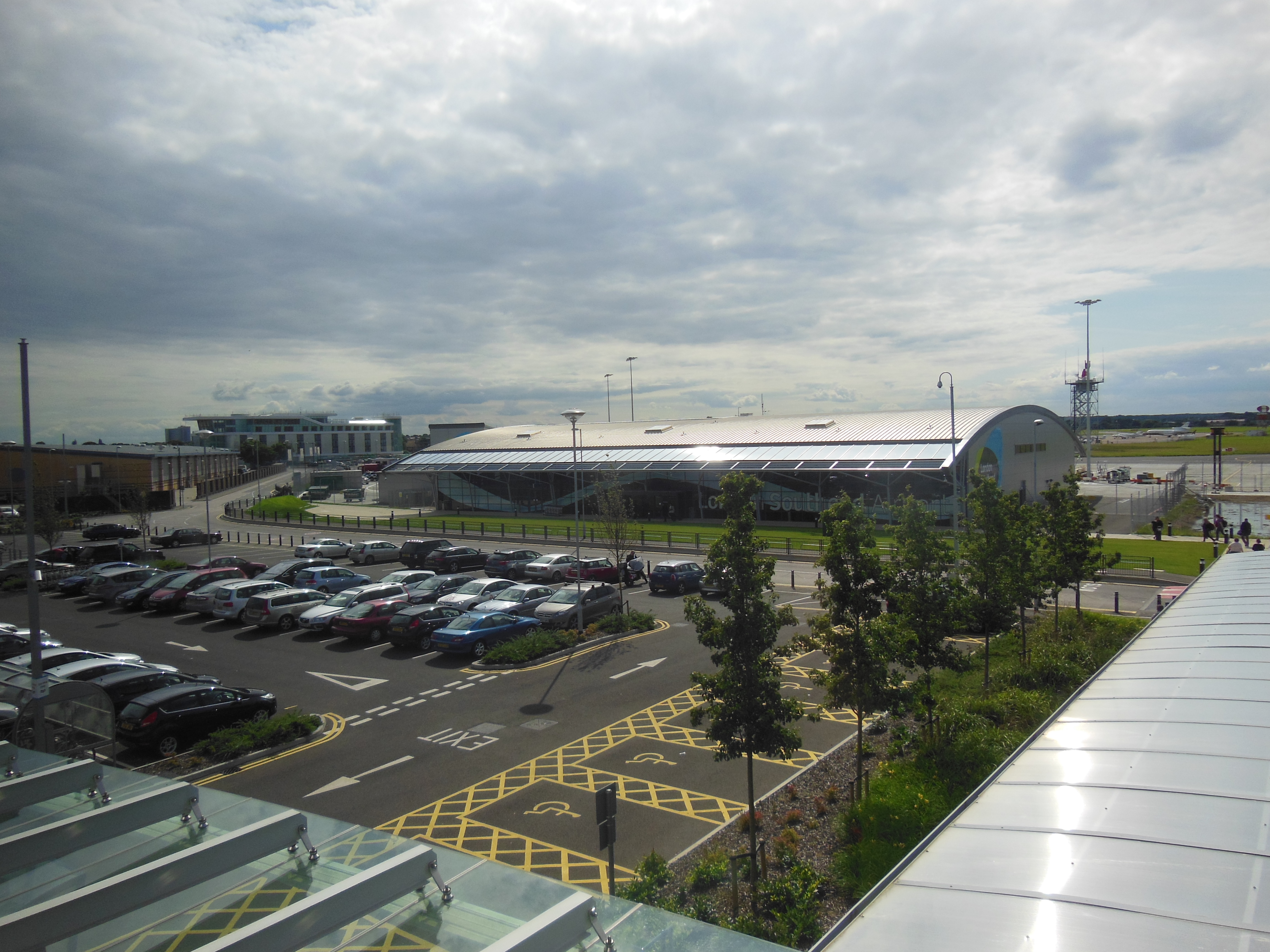
Pre-extension terminal building seen from railway station, illustrating proximity.

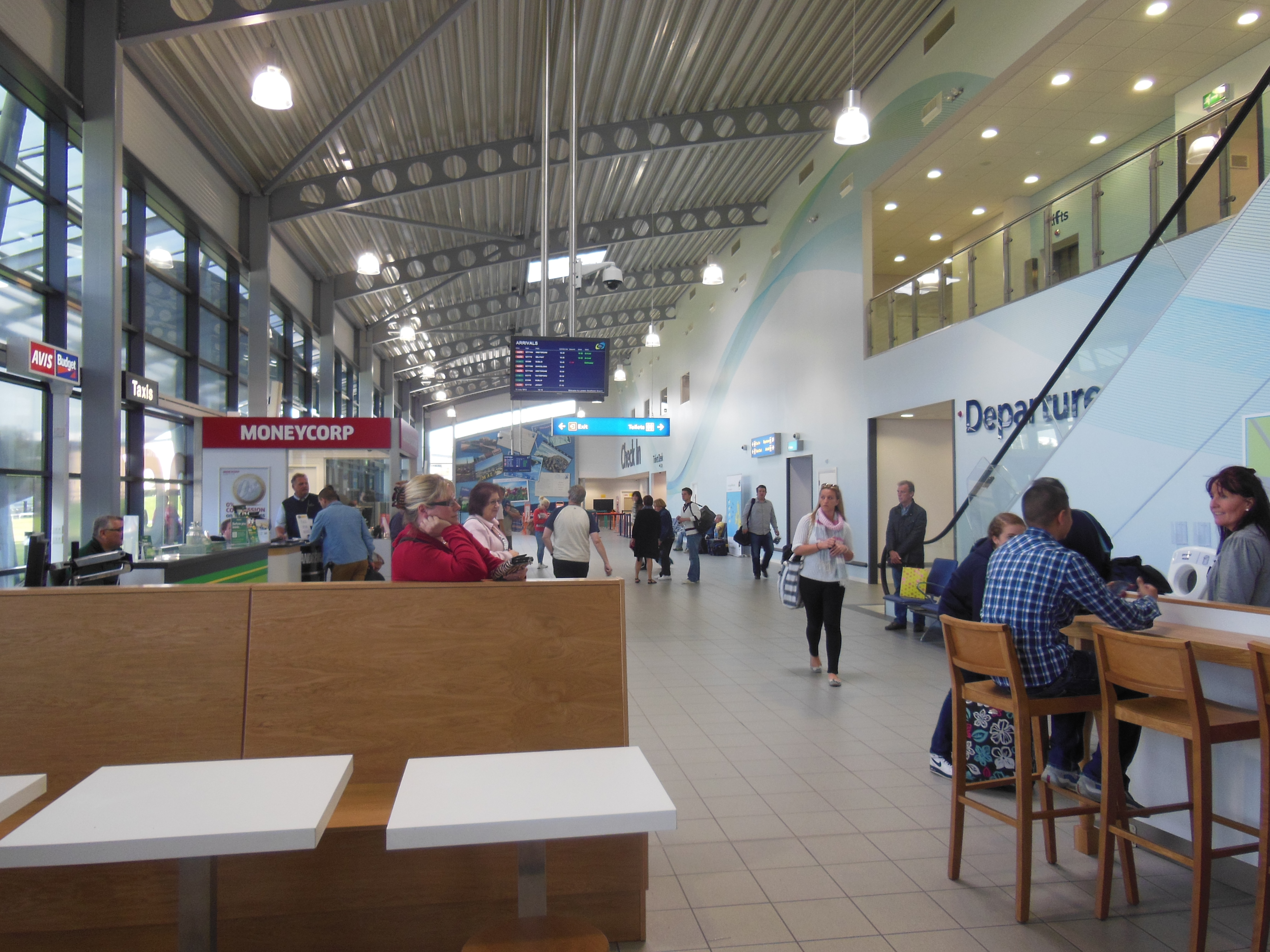
Interior of terminal building, seen from café by arrivals, and showing check-in area and escalator to departures.

The lease on the airport was bought on 2 December 2008 by the Stobart Group for £21 million, becoming part of the Stobart Air division of the Stobart Group, which also operates Carlisle Airport.

Following council consultation with the local population, a planning application to extend the usable runway length by 300 m (984 ft) to 1,799 m (5,902 ft) and upgrade navigational and lighting aids, was submitted to Southend Borough Council on 13 October 2009. Planning permission was granted on 20 January 2010. This was initially subject to an Article 14 Direction, but after due consideration by the Government this was withdrawn on 19 March 2010, meaning it would not be subject to a Public Inquiry. The airport and local councils entered into a Section 106 agreement.

On 1 June 2010, Stobart Group took a £100 million loan from M & G Investments, partly in order to fund the airport construction. In July 2010, an application for a judicial review of the planning application was filed, but this was dismissed on 2 February 2011. On 23 September 2010, the airport received the Airport Achievement Award 2010/11 from the European Regions Airline Association.

A replacement air traffic control tower became operational on 21 March 2011, followed by the return of year-round daily passenger services on 27 March 2011, when Aer Arann commenced services to Galway and Waterford in Ireland.

EasyJet announced a ten-year agreement with Stobart Group in June 2011, and in April 2012 commenced around 70 flights per week from Southend, using three Airbus A319 aircraft based at the airport, flying to eight European destinations. Easyjet's operation at the airport increased to 16 destinations and in the summer of 2018 they based a fourth aircraft at Southend, an Airbus A320.

A new on-site rail station opened on 18 July 2011, and a new road opened on 1 September 2011, replacing Eastwoodbury Lane which lay in the path required for the runway extension. The formal opening by Minister for Transport Theresa Villiers MP was on 21 September 2011.

=== 2012–2019: London Olympics and expansion of passenger flights ===
Before the 2012 Summer Olympic Games, a new terminal was built by Buckingham Group Contracting Ltd during 2011. It opened on 28 February 2012 (and formally opened by Justine Greening, Secretary of State for Transport, on 5 March 2012). The original terminal was redeveloped for use by private jets, with Stobart Air having invested £500 million turning it into an executive business lounge.

The extended runway opened on 8 March 2012. Because planes can land in either direction, it is designated as runway 5 for planes landing from the south-west and as runway 23 for those arriving from the north-east. Both approaches have Category I instrument landing systems (ILS) installed. In 2019, a new performance-based navigation system was proposed, as an alternative to using ILS.

On 7 April 2014, the extension to the passenger terminal was formally opened by Patrick McLoughlin, the Secretary of State for Transport. In spring 2014, Stobart Air announced that it had agreed a five-year franchise agreement with Flybe which would see two Flybe-branded aircraft based at Southend operating six routes from summer 2014. On 18 January 2015, two routes were terminated, and the operation reduced to one aircraft.

ATC Lasham, the major engineering company at the airport, entered administration in October 2015. The main hangar that it used dated back to Aviation Traders Engineering Limited (ATEL) – founded by the late Sir Freddie Laker – and was later used by Heavylift Engineering.

In December 2016, Flybe announced it would be adding new routes from summer 2017 to 12 European destinations, primarily aimed at the weekend break customers. The airline based two Embraer 195 aircraft at the airport. In October 2017, Flybe added high frequency short-haul routes to the airport, with up to 18 flights per week to Manchester, up to 16 flights per week to Dublin and up to 10 flights per week to Glasgow. An additional ATR 72 was based at the airport to operate the Manchester flights, bringing the total number of Flybe aircraft based at Southend to four.

In February 2018, Air Malta announced it would begin flights to Cagliari, Catania and Malta, which began in May 2018 although the Cagliari and Catania flights ceased in January 2019. In June 2018, Ryanair announced it would open a base at Southend, basing three aircraft there operating 55 flights per week to 13 destinations, which began in April 2019. In October 2018, Flybe announced it would commence five flights per week to Newquay Airport from April 2019, increasing to daily from May 2019.

In May 2019, Loganair started to fly to Aberdeen, Glasgow and Stornoway; in July 2019 to Carlisle, and Derry flights moved from Stansted to Southend on 27 October 2019. On 31 October 2019, Ryanair announced four new routes to launch in Summer 2020: Bergerac, Girona and Marseille were first announced, before Rodez was added as the route was moved from Stansted to Southend. In November 2019, Loganair announced that the Stornoway to Glasgow to Southend service would be withdrawn from 3 January 2020.

=== 2020–2021: COVID-19 pandemic and consolidation ===
In January 2020, Norwegian airline Widerøe announced it would move its Kristiansand route from Stansted to Southend at the start of the summer 2020 season.

In February 2020, it was announced Loganair would suspend its Aberdeen service, and in March, similarly the Carlisle service.

At the commencement of the COVID-19 UK lockdown, Wizz Air's revised schedule consolidated the Sibiu route at Luton Airport from when it re-started, cutting the route from Southend. In June 2020, Wizz Air cut Vilnius as a destination from Southend as well, leaving it with one route to Bucharest which had also since been suspended.

In August 2020, easyJet announced it would close its base at Southend entirely due to the Coronavirus pandemic, the last scheduled flight occurring on 31 August 2020. In August 2021, Ryanair also announced the closure of its base at Southend, effective 30 October 2021

=== 2021–present: Post-COVID-19 resumption ===
On 17 December 2021, easyJet signed a multi-year deal with the airport and announced that they would initially return in a limited capacity with routes to Málaga and Palma de Mallorca. In 2022, easyJet announced that it would add flights to Amsterdam and Faro for the Summer 2023 season. Further routes to Paris, Geneva, Grenoble and Alicante were announced in 2023.

In May 2022, Air Horizont announced it would base two of its Boeing 737 aircraft at the airport for VIP charter flights. In September 2022, ASL Airlines Ireland, operating for Amazon, announced it would terminate its cargo flights from Southend to Rome which was the airport's sole scheduled freight operation.

In June 2023, the airport owner, Esken announced that the airport had been put up for sale following a strategic review of the group's businesses. In July 2023, BH Air announced a route to Burgas for the summer 2024 season. In August 2023, 2Excel Aviation, operating for Oil Spill Response, announced it would use the airport as a base for its two Boeing 727 aircraft to respond to international oil incidents.

In March 2024, it was announced that the Carlyle Group, alongside Cyrrus Capital Partners, would take an 82.5% stake in the airport by converting debt to equity. The deal settled Esken's debt to Carlyle whilst providing a £5 million bridge loan and a commitment of £32 million of new funding to secure the airport's future.

In May 2024, easyJet announced that the airline would return to base at Southend Airport with six new destinations immediately announced, with those destinations being served by three Airbus A320neo aircraft. In September 2024, BH Air announced it would renew its Burgas route for the summer 2025 season, however the company announced in April 2025 that it was withdrawing from the UK market. Eastern Airways also announced new routes beginning in April 2025; Eastern subsequently entered administration in November 2025 after ceasing all operations.

By mid-2026, EasyJet was the only airline operating a regular schedule from Southend. The number of destinations available had been increased to 30.

In November 2026, Swiss airline Chair Airlines announced that it would commence a daily service between London Southend Airport and Zurich Airport on 27 May 2027. The route will add Zurich as a new destination to the airport's scheduled international network, complementing existing services to Switzerland operated by easyJet.

== Facilities ==
=== Terminal ===
The current terminal was built in 2012 as a part of the Stobart Group's development upon taking over the airport. It has twelve check-ins, two floors, ten departure gates and two baggage claims. There are several amenities such as shops and places to eat and drink.

=== London Southend Jet Centre ===
The London Southend Jet Centre is a fixed-base operator established in 2017 and situated at the airport with their own terminal, parking stands and hangar. The Jet Centre specialises in VIP facilities and handling for business and private aviation, alongside providing services to aircraft that have based themselves with the Jet Centre. The Jet Centre has also acted as the registered office address of Avooma Airlines since October 2024.

=== Runway ===
There were originally three runways in the 1950s. One was removed in the 1960s, and a second one was also removed in the 1990s, leaving one runway remaining and used today, 23/05.

In 2012, there was a 300 m runway extension to bring its present length to 1,856 m (6,089 ft) and both ends of the runway were equipped with a category I instrument landing system. In 2019, the runway was resurfaced with grooved asphalt for better durability and performance so that heavier aircraft, such as the Boeing 737-800 and Airbus A321, can operate commercially at the airport.

Some of the largest aircraft that have operated at the airport, for maintenance or scrapping, include the Airbus A300, Lockheed L-1011 TriStar and Ilyushin Il-76.

== Airlines and destinations ==
The following airlines operate regular scheduled and charter flights at London Southend Airport:

Airlines	Destinations
Chair Airlines	Zurich (begins 27 May 2027)
easyJet	Alicante, Amsterdam, Antalya, Barcelona, Berlin, Budapest, Edinburgh, Enfidha, Geneva, Gran Canaria, Málaga, Malta, Marrakesh, Paris–Charles de Gaulle, Tenerife–South; Seasonal: Almería, Belfast–City, Dalaman, Faro, Grenoble, Ibiza, Jersey, Lanzarote, Lyon (begins 3 December 2026), Munich, Pisa, Rhodes (begins 27 April 2027), Rovaniemi, Salzburg, Sharm El Sheikh (begins 4 January 2027)

== Statistics ==
Busiest routes to or from London Southend Airport (2025)
Rank	Airport	Passengers handled	Change 2024–2025
1	Palma de Mallorca	78,886	▲34.8%
2	Málaga	78,221	▲75.8%
3	Amsterdam	73,265	▲26.9%
4	Alicante	66,585	▲96.3%
5	Malta	45,759	▲ New Route for 2025
6	Paris–Charles de Gaulle	45,601	▲2%
7	Enfidha–Hammamet	36,518	▲ New Route for 2025
8	Gran Canaria	36,032	▲ New Route for 2025
9	Tenerife South	35,962	▲ New Route for 2025
10	Faro	33,678	▲12.3%
11	Marrakesh	33,405	▲ New Route for 2025
12	Dalaman	28,511	▲ New Route for 2025
13	Antalya	25,621	▲ New Route for 2025
14	Almería	19,038	▲ New Route for 2025
15	Pisa	16,975	▲ New Route for 2025
16	Reus	15,574	▲ New Route for 2025
17	Geneva	12,897	▲11.4%
18	Newquay	8,826	▲ New Route for 2025
19	Lanzarote	6,884	▲ New Route for 2025
20	Berlin Brandenburg	5,067	▲ New Route for 2025
21	Barcelona–El Prat	4,997	▲ New Route for 2025
22	Rovaniemi	2,878	▲ New Route for 2025
23	Salzburg	842	▲ New Route for 2025
24	Alpes–Isère (Grenoble)	667	▲6.4%
25	Ivalo	436	▲1.4%

Airport passengers and air movements
Year	Passengers	Air movements
1994	495	51,223
1995	600	54,826
1996	4,251	57,361
1997	9,000	TBA
1998	4,000	TBA
1999	3,555	TBA
2000	3,262	TBA
2001	4,366	TBA
2002	4,959	43,054
2003	2,702	42,803
2004	3,224	37,558
2005	5,133	38,696
2006	30,222	TBA
2007	49,311	39,881
2008	44,075	37,227
2009	3,948	31,789
2010	3,583	27,320
2011	42,439	25,470
2012	616,974	27,715
2013	969,912	29,443
2014	1,102,358	30,514
2015	900,658	23,358
2016	874,549	23,449
2017	1,092,391	26,674
2018	1,480,139	32,531
2019	2,035,535	36,473
2020	401,143	18,401
2021	94,367	34,114
2022	89,361	26,624
2023	146,072	31,546
2024	287,758	27,134
2025	719,513	30,728

Note: "Air movements" includes a large number of non-commercial movements, especially Aero Club flights, as well as freight flights etc.

== Ground transport ==
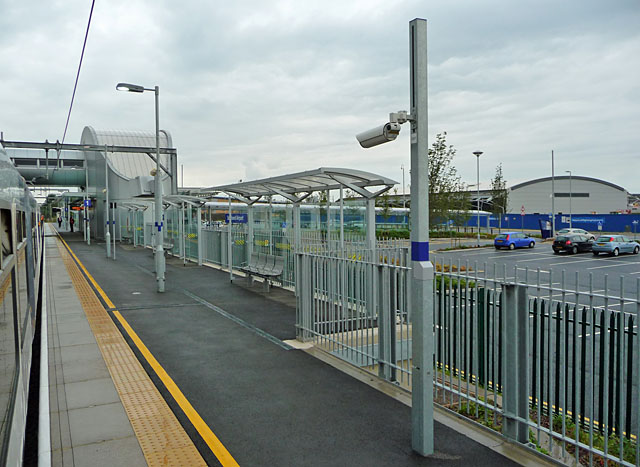
Southend Airport railway station. The terminal can be seen on the right.

=== Rail ===
The airport has its own railway station near the terminal building, Southend Airport on the Shenfield-Southend line, which opened in 2011. It is served by Greater Anglia connecting the airport to Liverpool Street in London usually every 20 minutes, with additional services during peak times, and to Southend Victoria in the other direction. The journey to London takes about 55 minutes.

An additional later train operates to London every night, except Saturday night, with an early morning train to the airport from London every day, except Sunday morning.

=== Bus ===
The airport is served by buses operated by Arriva Southend from the airport entrance to Southend (7, 8 and 9), Rochford (7 and 8), Ashingdon (7), Hawkwell (8), Hockley (7 and 8), Eastwood (9) and Rayleigh (7, 8 and 9). First Essex operates Essex Airlink X30 from the terminal to Chelmsford and London Stansted Airport. On 8 June 2019, Ensignbus started operating the Jetlink X1, a night bus service running once in each direction from Southend Airport to Grosvenor Gardens, London via Lakeside Shopping Centre bus station, Canning Town and Embankment stations, however this bus service was later withdrawn due to it being banned by the airport authorities. It recommenced on 5 October 2019 but was withdrawn again in March 2020 due to the COVID-19 pandemic.

== Accidents and incidents ==
- On 11 February 1944, a Boeing B-17 42-31694 of the USAAF (511th BS) crash-landed and burned out at Southend after receiving battle damage during a raid on Frankfurt.
- On 11 May 1944, B17G 42-107147 of the USAAF (360BS) made an emergency wheels-up landing with heavy flak damage after a mission to Saarbrücken.
- On 28 July 1959, an East Anglian Flying Services Vickers 614 Viking 1 (registered G-AHPH) was written off in a landing accident at the airport. On approach, the aircraft's right-hand main gear indicator showed that the gear was unsafe. An emergency landing was made on the grass parallel to the runway. The right gear collapsed and the aircraft swung to the right, damaging it beyond repair. None of the 39 occupants were injured.
- On 9 October 1960, a Handley Page Hermes of Falcon Airways (registration: G-ALDC) overran the runway on landing, ending up across the Shenfield-Southend line The aircraft was written off, but all 76 people on board survived.
- On 3 May 1967, a Vickers Viscount of Channel Airways (registration: G-AVJZ) was written off when a propeller was feathered on take-off. Two people on the ground died.
- On 4 May 1968, a Vickers Viscount of Channel Airways (registration: G-APPU) overran the runway, having landed at too high a speed. The aircraft was written off.
- On 4 October 1974, the flight engineer of a DAT Douglas DC-6 (registration: OO-VGB) retracted the nose gear during take-off, even though the aircraft was not yet airborne, due to a communication error with the pilots. The aircraft slid along the runway and was damaged beyond repair. Of the 99 passengers on board the flight to Antwerp, one was severely injured and another four received minor injuries from evacuating the aircraft. The six crew members remained uninjured.
- On 12 September 1987, a Beechcraft 200 (registration: G-WSJE) carrying newspapers crashed at night into Mac's Garage on the Eastwood Road in Rayleigh. The pilot, 33-year-old Hugh Forrester Brown from nearby Canewdon, was thought to have attempted to crash land on the road after take-off, but he was unable to and hit the empty garage; he was killed in the crash.
- On 11 January 1988, a Vickers Viscount of British Air Ferries (registration: G-APIM) was damaged beyond economic repair when it was in a ground collision with a Fairflight Short 330 (registration: G-BHWT). The BAF Viscount was subsequently repaired and donated to Brooklands Museum for preservation.
- On 6 March 1997, a Piper PA-34 Seneca (registration: G-NJML) flying a charter taking aircraft spare parts to Ostend crashed 3.5 mi (5.6 km) to the north-east of the airport while attempting to return following the failure of the gyroscope in the aircraft's attitude indicator. One of the two occupants died; the other was seriously injured.
- On 19 July 2006, a Cessna 150 (registration: G-BABB) being flown by a student pilot on his second solo flight crashed into a public park 1 nmi (1.9 km; 1.2 mi) from the airport. The student pilot was fatally injured.
- On 13 July 2025, a Beechcraft 200 (registration: PH-ZAZ), operating as Zeusch Aviation Flight 1, crashed shortly after takeoff. Four people were killed.

== See also ==
- Expansion of London Southend Airport
- List of airports in the United Kingdom and the British Crown Dependencies
- Airports of London
- Military history of Britain
- Military history of the United Kingdom during World War II
