= Prittlewell railway station =

Railway station in Essex, England

Coordinates: 51.551°N 0.711°E

Prittlewell
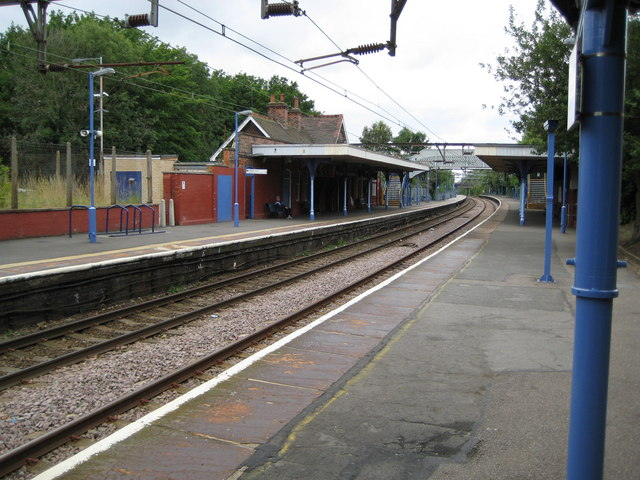
- Station platforms as seen in August 2008

General information
- Location: Prittlewell, Southend-on-Sea; England
- Grid reference: TQ880870
- Managed by: Greater Anglia
- Platforms: 2

Other information
- Station code: PRL
- Classification: DfT category E

History
- Original company: Great Eastern Railway
- Pre-grouping: Great Eastern Railway
- Post-grouping: London and North Eastern Railway

Key dates
- 1 October 1889: Station opened

Passengers
- 2020/21: ▼97,456
- 2021/22: ▲0.228 million
- 2022/23: ▲0.281 million
- 2023/24: ▲0.329 million
- 2024/25: ▲0.362 million
Location
Notes
- Passenger statistics from the Office of Rail and Road

Prittlewell railway station is on the Shenfield to Southend Line in the East of England, serving the residential district of Prittlewell in Southend-on-Sea, Essex. It is 40 miles 67 chains (65.72 km) down the line from London Liverpool Street and is situated between Southend Airport and Southend Victoria stations. The station is managed by Greater Anglia, who operate all services.

== History ==
The line from Wickford to Southend (including Prittlewell station) was opened on 1 October 1889. There was a goods yard handling mainly domestic coal to the north-west of Prittlewell station; the yard closed on 5 June 1967. Electrification of the Shenfield to Southend Victoria line using 1.5 kV DC overhead line electrification (OLE) was completed on 31 December 1956. This was changed to 6.25 kV AC in November 1960 and to 25 kV AC on 25 January 1979.

Between November 2025 and June 2026, the footbridge was temporarily removed to be refurbished.

== Location ==
The station is close to Prittlewell Priory, Priory Park and to Southend United's football stadium, Roots Hall.

It is located on the outskirts of the town centre itself.

== Facilities ==
The station has a car park, cycle spaces, a waiting room, a ticket office and a ticket machine, and live departure screens.

== Passenger volume ==
Passenger volume at Prittlewell
	2004–05	2005–06	2006–07	2007–08	2008–09	2009–10	2010–11	2011–12	2012–13	2013–14	2014–15	2015–16	2016–17	2017–18	2018–19	2019–20	2020–21	2021–22	2022–23	2023–24	2024–25
Entries and exits	109,424	95,272	118,925	113,265	111,498	108,752	110,794	125,050	160,930	163,802	424,804	195,870	209,708	188,044	220,626	227,204	97,456	228,116	281,278	328,594	362,280

The statistics cover twelve month periods that start in April.

== Services ==
The typical off-peak service in each direction is three trains per hour. In the London-bound direction, trains call at all stations along the line to its western terminus of Shenfield, where they join the Great Eastern Main Line to run to Stratford and Liverpool Street (one of which calls additionally at Romford).

Preceding station	National Rail	Following station
Southend Airport	Greater Anglia; Shenfield–Southend line	Southend Victoria

== Community rail ==
The station, as with all stations on the line, is part of the Essex & South Suffolk Community Rail Partnership.
