= Shenfield =

Suburb of the Borough of Brentwood, in Essex, England

Coordinates: 51.6297°N 0.3192°E

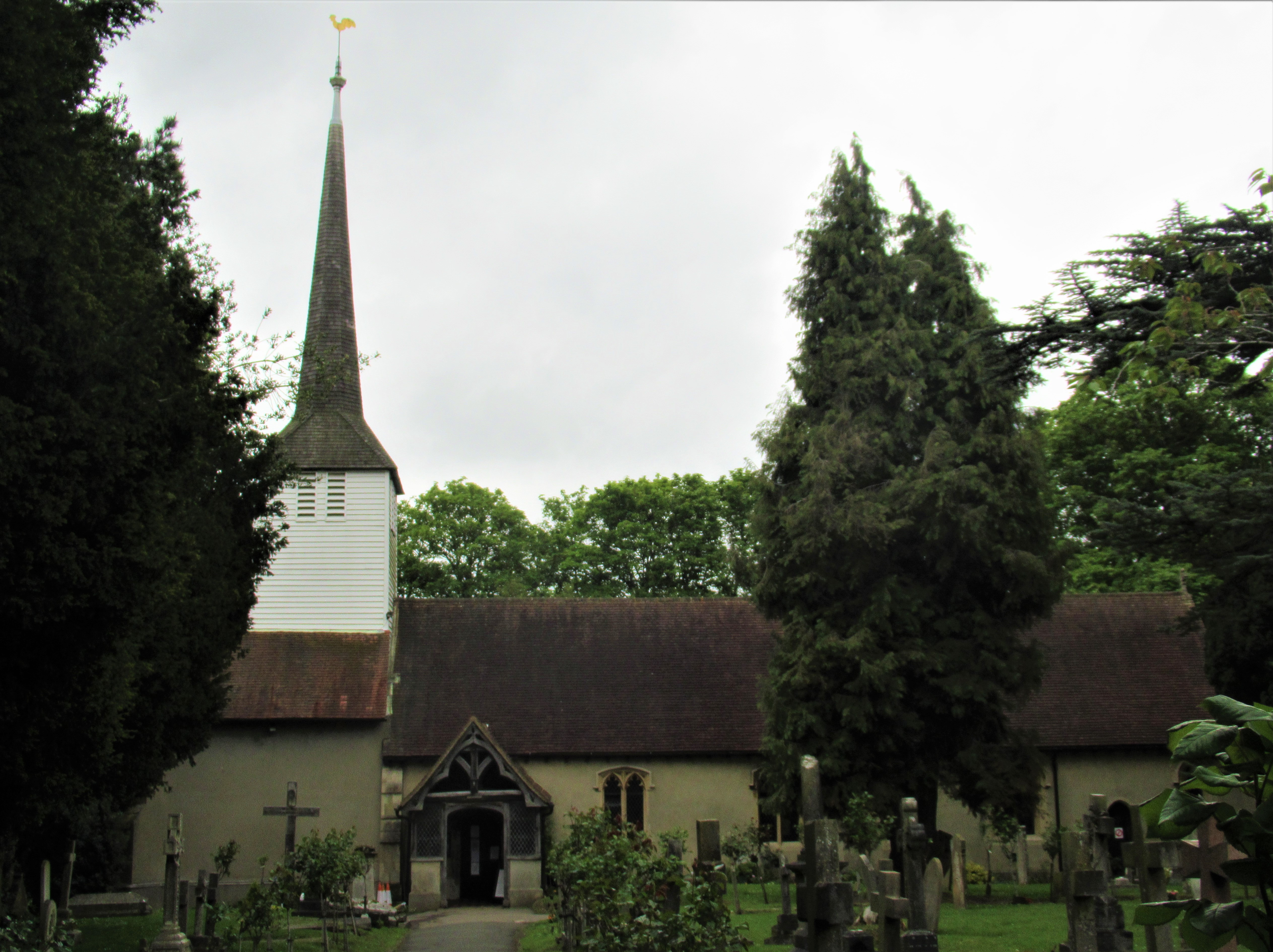
- St Mary's Church

- Location within Essex
- Area: 6.84 km^{2} (2.64 sq mi)
- Population: 5,460 (Ward, 2021)
  - Density: 788.9/km^{2}
- OS grid reference: TQ614950
  - London: 20.8 miles NNE
- District: Brentwood
- Shire county: Essex
- Region: East
- Country: England
- Sovereign state: United Kingdom
- Post town: BRENTWOOD
- Postcode district: CM15
- Dialling code: 01277
- Police: Essex
- Fire: Essex
- Ambulance: East of England
- UK Parliament: Brentwood and Ongar

Shenfield is a suburb of the Borough of Brentwood, in Essex, England. It lies to the north-east of Brentwood town centre. Shenfield was historically a separate village and parish. The civil parish was abolished in 1934, since when Shenfield has been administered as part of Brentwood; it now forms part of the Brentwood built-up area and gives its name to one of the wards of the Borough of Brentwood. At the 2021 census, the ward had a population of 5,460.

== History ==
The name Shenfield means "beautiful open land".

Shenfield is listed in the Domesday Book of 1086 as Scenefelda, in the Barstable Hundred of Essex.

No church or priest is mentioned in the Domesday Book, but Shenfield became a parish. The parish church, dedicated to St Mary the Virgin, dates back to the 15th century. Immediately north of the church is the manor house of Shenfield Hall, which dates back to medieval times.

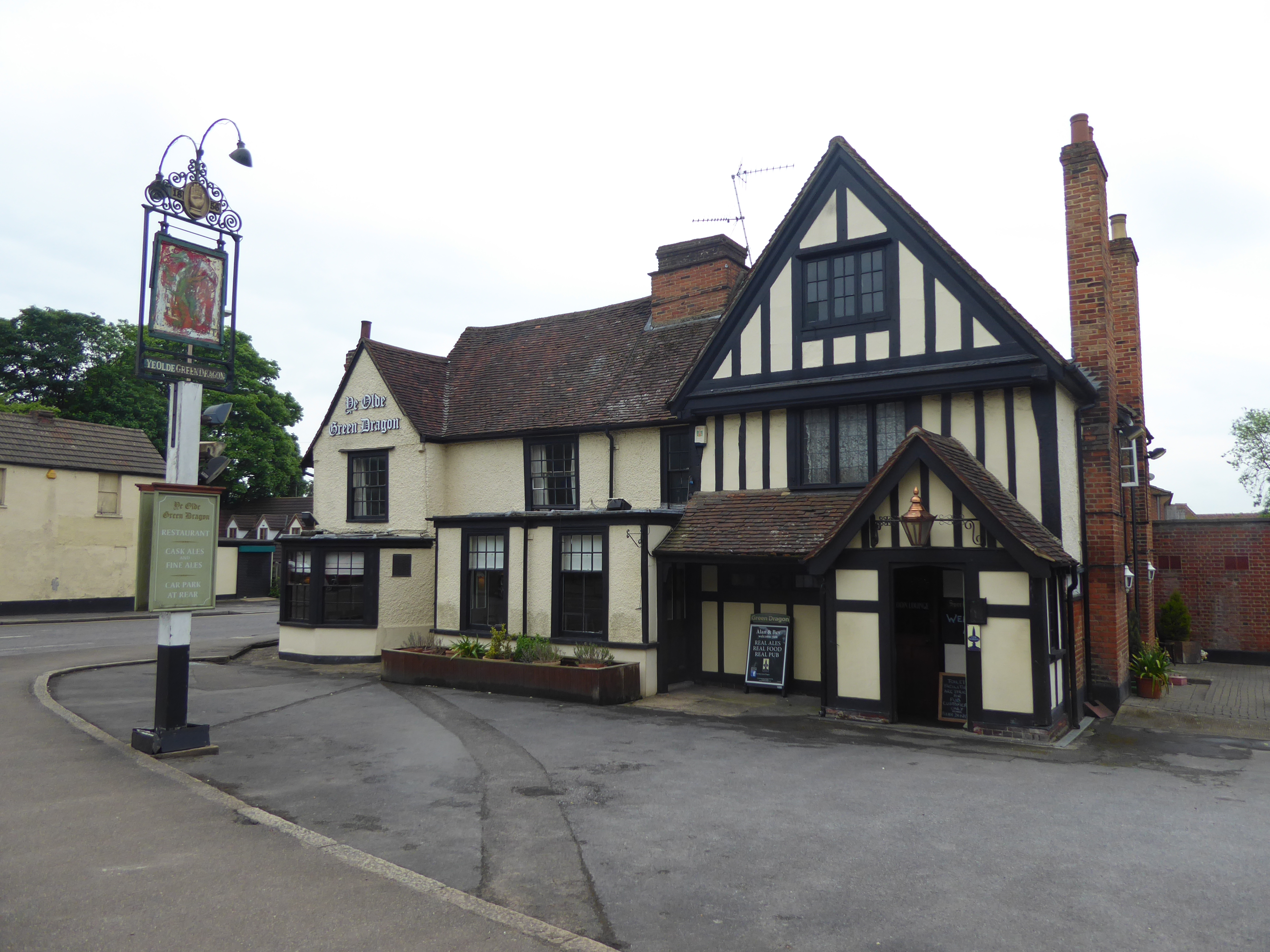
The Green Dragon Inn

The church and Shenfield Hall stand a short distance north of the old Roman road linking London to Colchester. The main part of the village grew up along this road, which later became the A12 before being bypassed and redesignated as the A1023. The Green Dragon Inn was built around 1500.

To the south-west of the village, Shenfield's parish boundaries extended to include Shenfield Common, a large open space on the edge of the town centre of Brentwood. It was common land until 1881 when it was converted into a public park.

Nathaniel Ward, a Puritan clergyman and author, was made minister of the Shenfield church in 1648 and held that office until his death in 1652.

Shenfield railway station first opened in 1843 on the main line of the Eastern Counties Railway from London to Colchester. The station was on the eastern edge of Shenfield parish, very close to the boundary with neighbouring Hutton. The station was not a commercial success, serving what was then a very sparsely populated area, and it closed in 1850. The station was re-opened in 1887 under the new name of "Shenfield and Hutton Junction", to serve as a junction station for the new Southend branch line which was then under construction and opened two years later. The station's name was changed back to just Shenfield in 1969.

When elected parish and district councils were established in 1894, Shenfield was given a parish council and included in the Billericay Rural District. In 1934 the parish was abolished. Most of its area, including the village itself, was added to the neighbouring urban district of Brentwood. A small rural area at the northern tip of the old Shenfield parish was transferred instead to Mountnessing. Neighbouring Hutton was likewise absorbed into Brentwood at the same time. At the 1931 census (the last before the abolition of the civil parish), Shenfield had a population of 3,501.

Shenfield and Hutton are now both classed as part of the Brentwood built up area by the Office for National Statistics.

== Transport ==
=== Railway ===
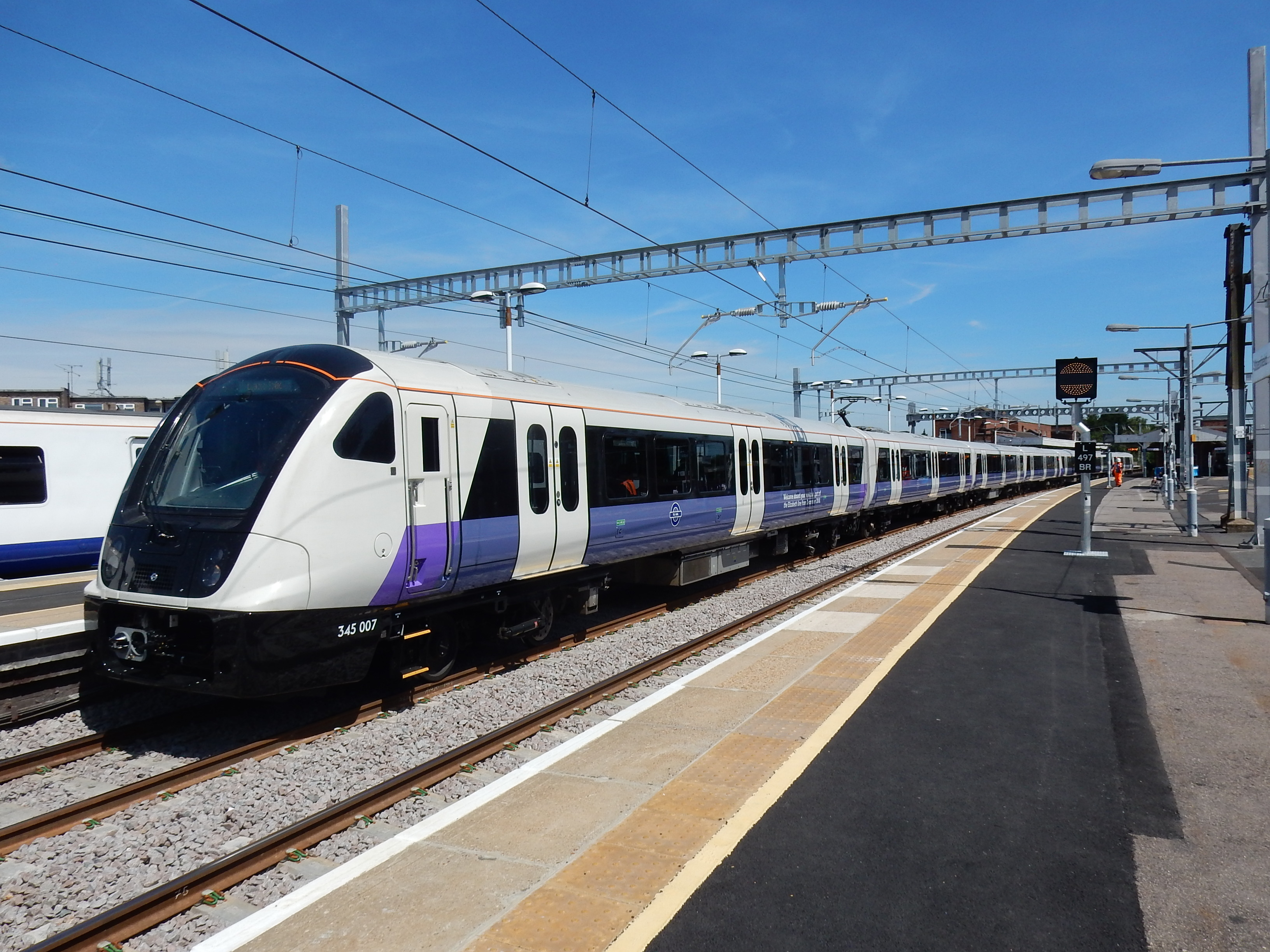
An Elizabeth line train at Shenfield station

Shenfield railway station is situated on the following lines:

- Great Eastern Main Line - providing direct services to London Liverpool Street, Chelmsford, Braintree, Colchester, Clacton and Ipswich. Services are operated by Greater Anglia.
- Shenfield to Southend Line - services operate between Liverpool Street, Billericay, Wickford, Southend Airport and Southend Victoria. The Crouch Valley Line to Southminster can be accessed easily by changing at Wickford. Services are also operated by Greater Anglia.
- Elizabeth line - Shenfield is the eastern terminus for the stopping service to Paddington, via Brentwood, Romford, Stratford and Liverpool Street. Trains run with an off-peak frequency of 8 trains per hour, of which two continue to Heathrow Terminal 5. Services are operated by MTR Elizabeth line.

Currently, fast train services reach Liverpool Street in 20 to 25 minutes. The slower Elizabeth line stopping services take 43 minutes to reach Liverpool Street. Shenfield is in the London commuter belt.

The station is located on the A129, at the eastern end of Hutton Road.

=== Roads ===
The previously mentioned A129 starts from the A1023, is called Hutton Road, and runs to Hadleigh. The A1023 also passes through the area, connecting Shenfield to the M25 and A12.

=== Buses ===
Bus routes in Shenfield are operated primarily by First Essex. Routes include:

- 9 Brentwood - Billericay - Basildon
- 81 Warley - Hutton
- 251 Warley - Wickford
- 339 Epping - Shenfield
- 351 Warley - Chelmsford

== Schools ==
There are two state secondary schools in the suburb: Shenfield High School and St Martin's School; the two state primary schools are Shenfield St Mary's Church of England school and Long Ridings.

== Retail and shopping ==
The shopping area in Shenfield consists primarily of independent stores and bars, shops and a plethora of other stores including takeaways, small restaurants, cafes, banks and hair salons.

== Sport and leisure ==
The town is host to the Shenfield Cricket Club, founded in 1921 and situated on the Courage Playing Fields. The land was granted by the Courage brewing family for use by the cricket club. The club's badge is a cockerel, which echoes both the trade mark of the Courage brand and the weathervane on St Mary's church.

The Courage Playing Fields also contain a children's playing area.There are additional playing fields on Alexander Lane, next to Shenfield High School.

== Community spaces ==
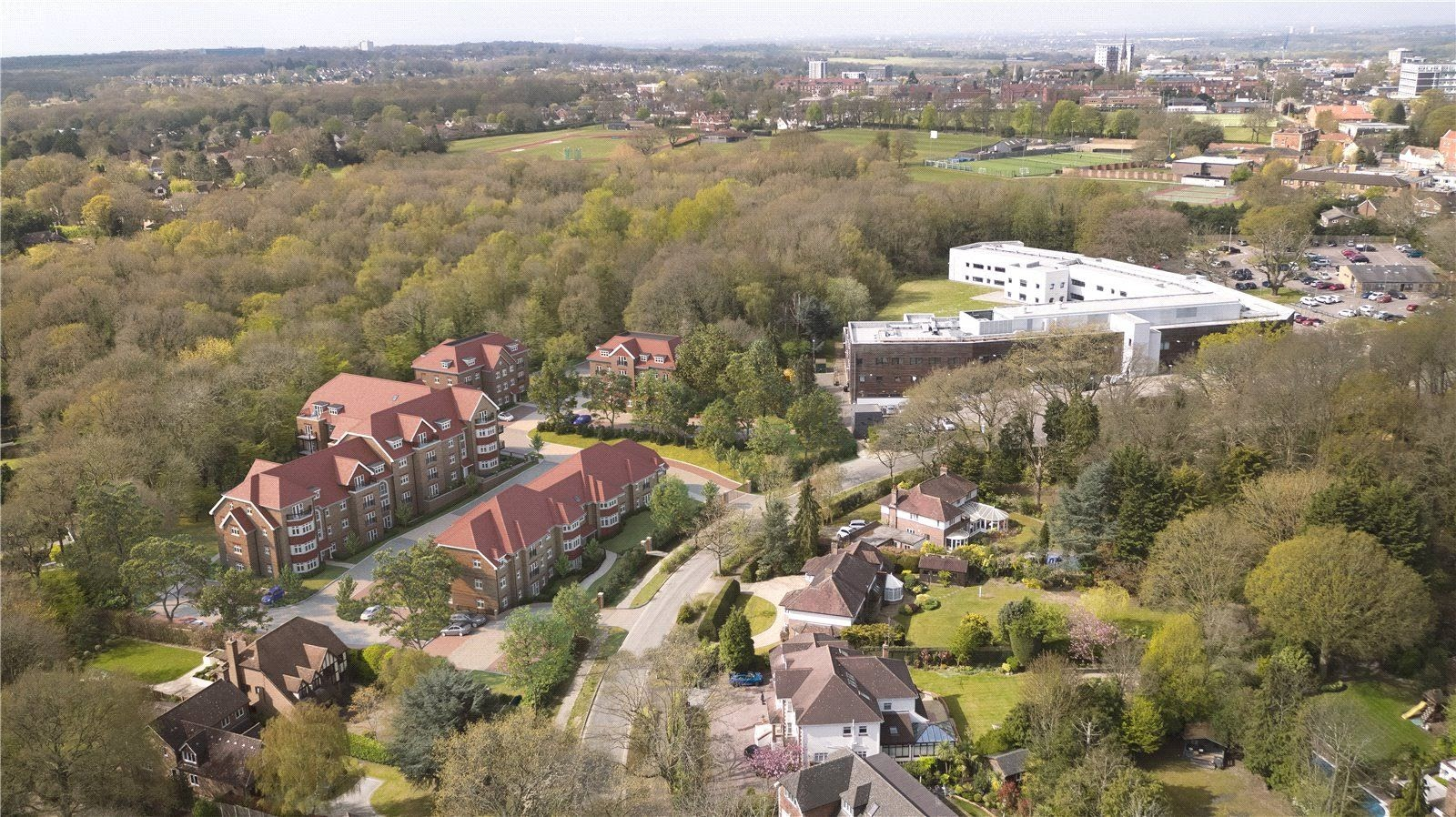
New housing development and the Brentwood Community Hospital, in Shenfield

Shenfield has a library, which was at risk of closure. However this was averted and a new library is being built in its place with retail and residential facilities. Brentwood Community Hospital serves both Shenfield and the wider borough, and is on Crescent Drive. It was rebuilt in 2008 and is very modern. There is also the private Nuffield Health hospital on Shenfield Road, less than a minute away from the NHS hospital.

== Development ==
Shenfield is set to house the borough's second largest residential development as part of its Local Development Plan (LDP), Officers Meadow with 825 homes. These will be built on land around Chelmsford Road near the A12 and the railway line. A new primary school, day nursery, and care home is planned, and there are hopes that retail and a health centre will also be provided. Opposite, new grounds for Hutton FC are being built. Several smaller residential developments have sprung up, on Crescent Drive, Shenfield Road and Chelmsford Road. 75 homes are also earmarked for land at the end of Bishop Walk, just off Priests Lane, not far from the town of Brentwood itself.
