= Shenfield–Southend line =

Railway branch line in Essex, England

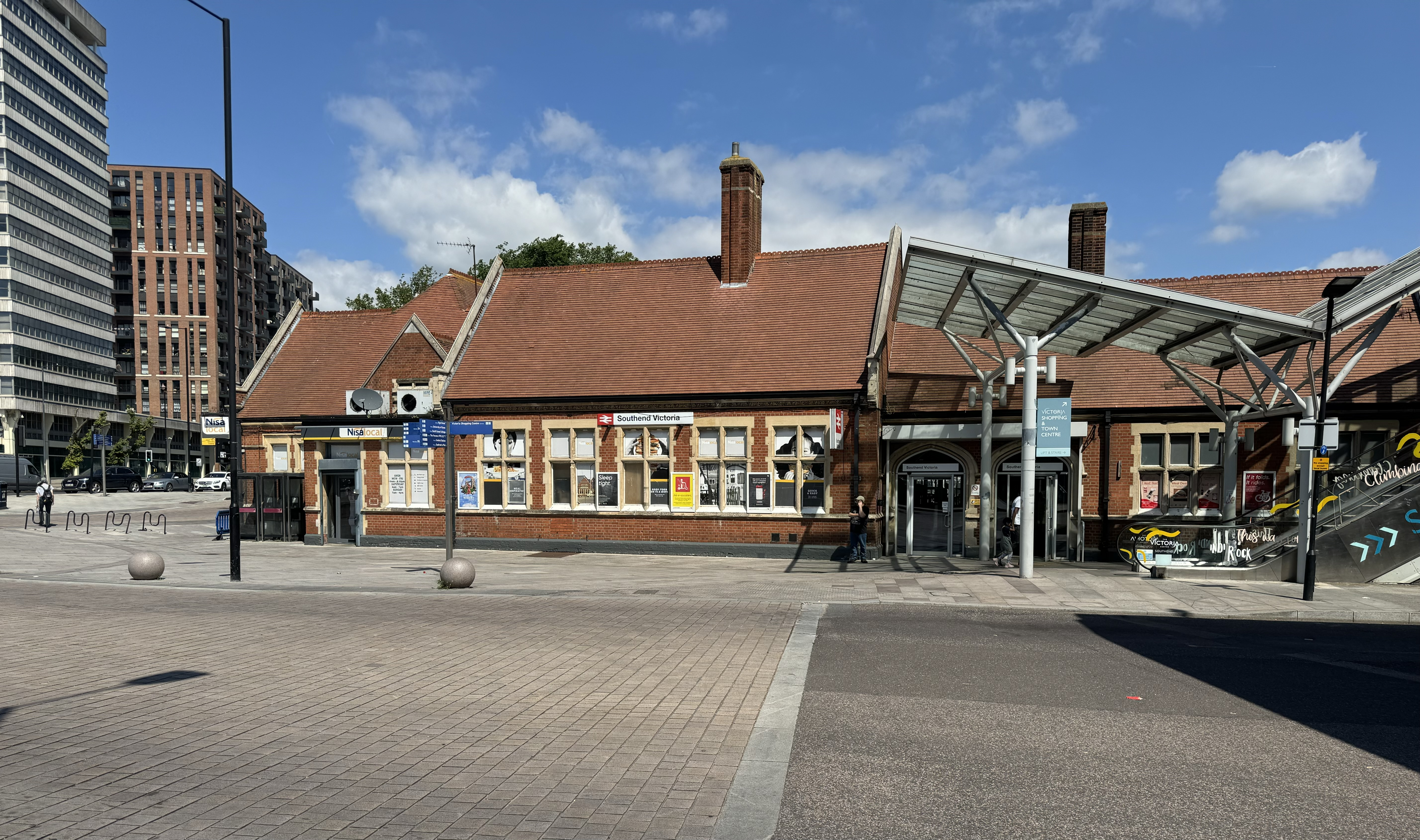
- Southend Victoria is the eastern terminus of the line

Overview
- Owner: Network Rail
- Locale: Essex
- Termini: Shenfield; Southend Victoria
- Stations: 9

Service
- Type: Commuter rail
- System: National Rail
- Operator: Greater Anglia
- Depot: Ilford
- Rolling stock: Class 720

Technical
- Line length: 22 miles 26 chains (35.9 km)
- Track gauge: 1,435 mm (4 ft 8 1/2 in) standard gauge
- Electrification: 25 kV 50 Hz AC OHLE
- Operating speed: 90 mph (140 km/h)
Route map
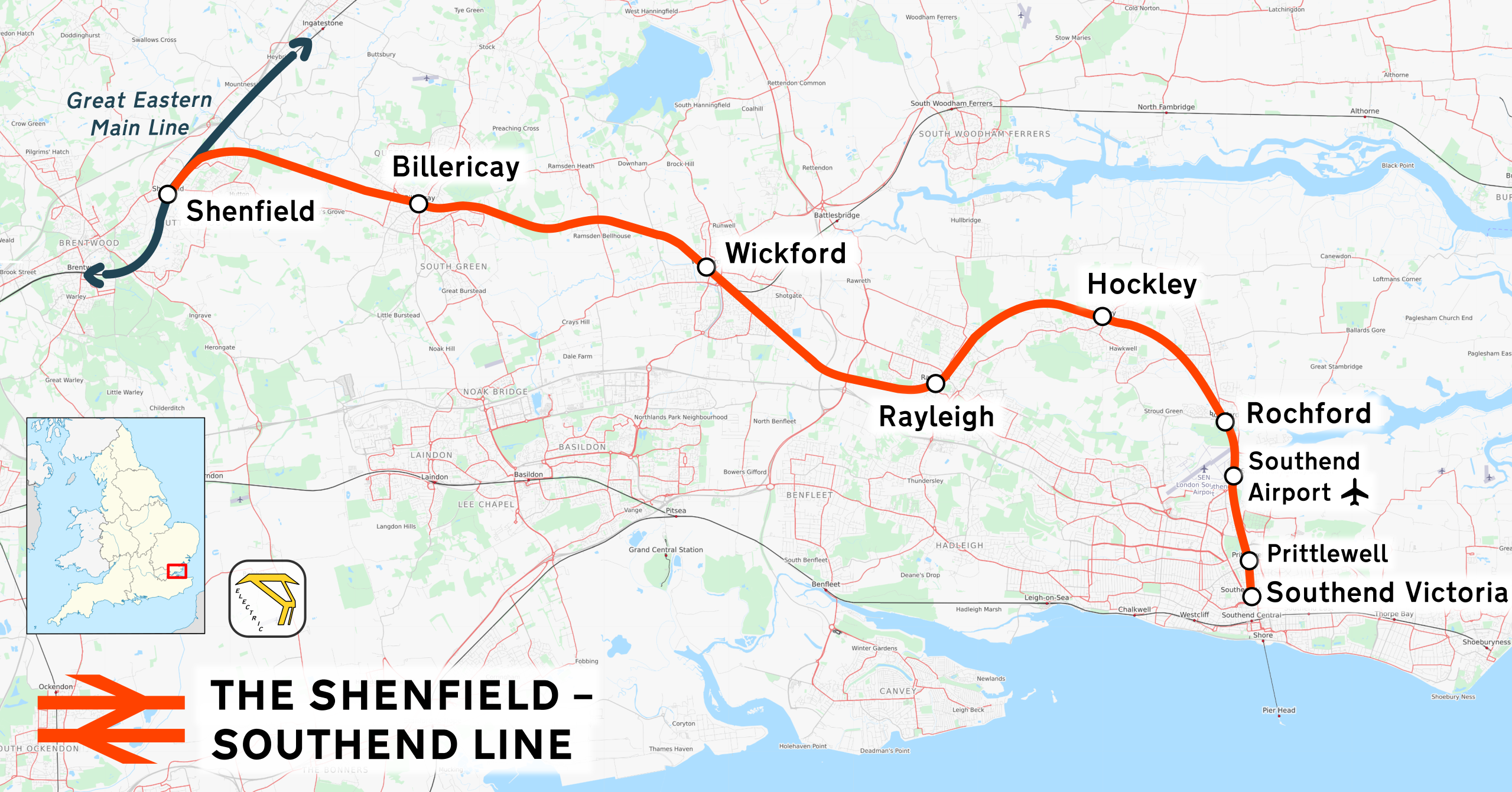
(Click to expand)

The Shenfield–Southend line is a branch line off the Great Eastern Main Line in Essex, in the east of England. It links Shenfield in the west to Southend Victoria, in Southend-on-Sea, in the east. The vast majority of services connect to or from the Great Eastern Main Line and its London terminus at Liverpool Street.

The line is part of the Network Rail Strategic Route 7, SRS 07.05, and is classified as a London and South East commuter line. Passenger services on the line are currently operated by Greater Anglia.

== History ==
The line, as well as the Crouch Valley line which branches off it at Wickford, was opened in 1888–89, and represented the largest railway building project in Essex undertaken by the Great Eastern Railway (GER). The 15 stations on these "New Essex" lines were the epitome of the "domestic revival" style, pioneered on the GER by the company's architect, W. N. Ashbee, which came to be known as the New Essex or Ashbee style. The stations on the Shenfield–Southend line are largely in their original form, including the platform canopies.

Throughout its history, the line has had three different systems of electrification, all of which have used overhead lines to carry the electric current. The first system, commissioned in 1956, used 1500 V DC, following the commissioning of the main line from London to Shenfield in 1949. That replaced an intensive steam service. In the 1960s, the electric supply was converted to 6.25 kV, 50 Hz AC, as part of the decision by the British Transport Commission to adopt 25 kV 50 Hz AC electrification as the standard system, rather than 1500 V DC. The line was not immediately converted to 25 kV AC due to problems with clearances under bridges. In 1979, the supply was converted to 25 kV AC, following more research into the permissible clearances between the overhead wires and other structures. Between 2017 and 2020 the overhead line equipment (OHLE) was renewed with an auto-tensioning system. The former 3-wire compound catenary was replaced with a simple 2-wire catenary with new and reused structural steel-work and new wire supports, insulators and registration arms.

== Infrastructure ==
The line diverges from the Great Eastern Main Line at Shenfield and is double track throughout. It is 22 miles 26 chains (35.9 km) in length.

It is electrified at 25 kV, has a loading gauge of W6 and a maximum line speed of 80 mph (130 km/h), increasing to 90 mph (140 km/h) where it joins the Great Eastern Main Line.

The line is signalled for bidirectional working; there are crossovers at Mountnessing junction, Billericay, Wickford and Hockley.

=== Stations ===
The following table summarises the line's nine stations, their distance measured from London Liverpool Street and estimated number of passenger entries/exits in 2018–19:

Station	Location	Local authority	Mileage	Patronage
Shenfield	Shenfield	Borough of Brentwood	20 1/4	4,149,488
Billericay	Billericay	Borough of Basildon	24 1/4	3,043,344
Wickford	Wickford	Borough of Basildon	29	2,261,210
Rayleigh	Rayleigh	District of Rochford	33	1,832,722
Hockley	Hockley	District of Rochford	36	724,288
Rochford	Rochford	District of Rochford	38 1/2	615,582
Southend Airport	Southend Airport	District of Rochford	39 1/2	611,256
Prittlewell	Prittlewell	City of Southend-on-Sea	40 3/4	220,626
Southend Victoria	Southend-on-Sea	City of Southend-on-Sea	41 1/2	2,129,590

== Services ==
All the stations and services on the line are currently operated by Greater Anglia. The company took over from National Express East Anglia in 2012, which in turn had replaced the previous operator First Great Eastern in 2004, when all the operators in East Anglia were merged into one new franchise. First Great Eastern (owned by FirstGroup) had operated the Great Eastern franchise from January 1997 until March 2004.

The majority of services run between Southend Victoria and London Liverpool Street, although a limited service operates only between Shenfield and Southend Victoria. Trains are formed of Class 720 units. A typical journey along the length of the line takes 35 minutes.
