= Article 14 direction =

An Article 14 Direction (as it was formerly called) was, in British planning law, a directive issued by the British Government which prevented a Local Planning Authority granting planning permission for a specific proposal. It had no time limit, so remained in force until explicitly lifted. It was typically used to allow a regional government office more time to consider proposals.

Such a direction was made under article 14 of the Town and Country Planning (General Development Procedure) Order 1995 (SI 1995/419). It was subsequently called an Article 25 Direction in England, and was made in that country under article 25 of the Town and Country Planning (Development Management Procedure) Order 2010 (SI 2010/ 2184). It is now called an Article 31 Direction in England, and is made that country under article 31 of the Town and Country Planning (Development Management Procedure) (England) Order 2015 (SI 2015/595). In Wales, it is made under article 18 of Town and Country Planning (Development Management Procedure) (Wales) Order 2012 (SI 2012/801).

== See also ==
- Conservation in the United Kingdom
