= Shenfield railway station =

Railway station in Essex, England

Shenfield
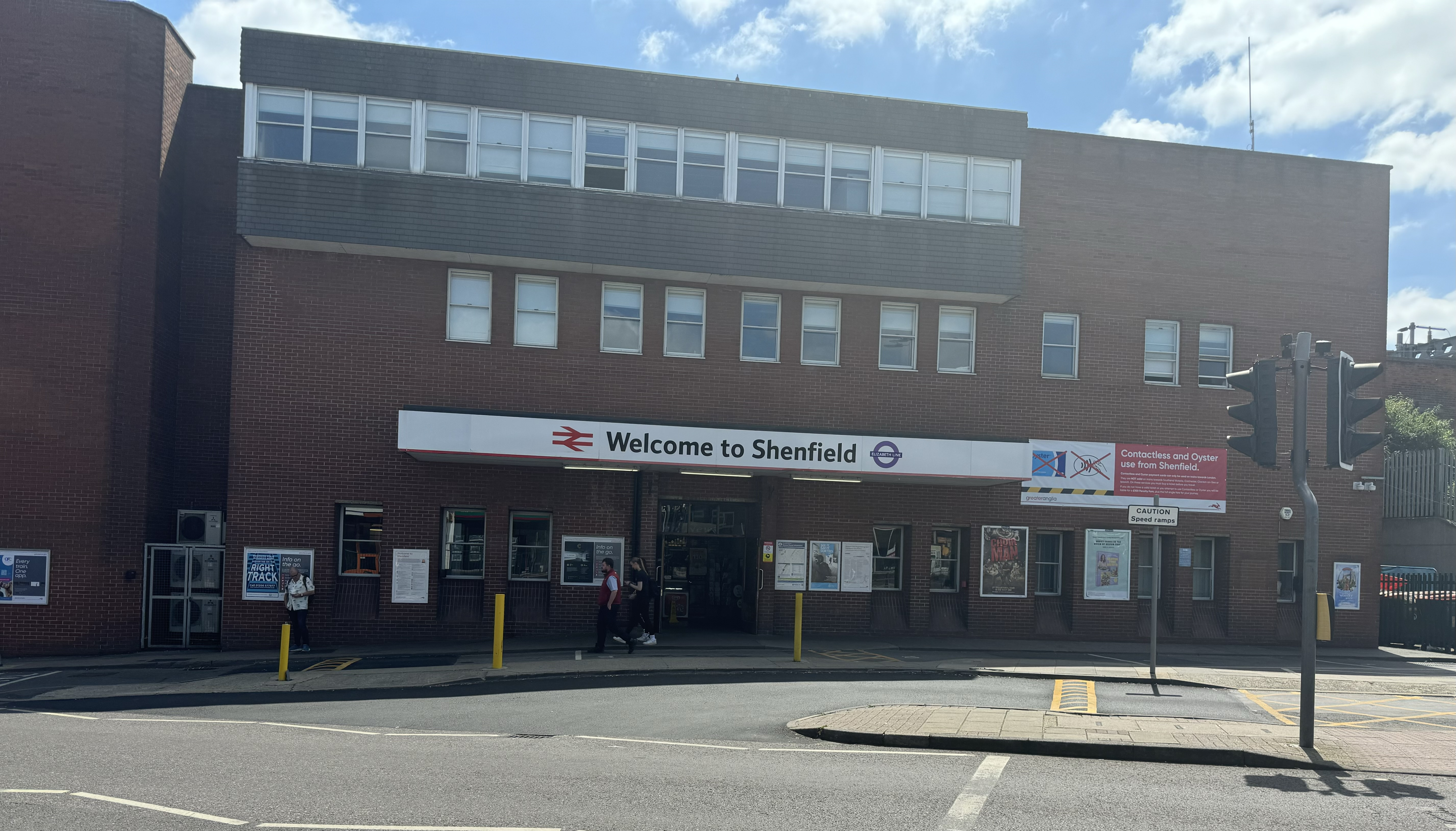
- Station entrance, as seen in June 2024
- Interactive map of Shenfield

General information
- Location: Shenfield
- Local authority: Borough of Brentwood
- Grid reference: TQ613949
- Managed by: Greater Anglia
- Owner: Network Rail
- Station code: SNF
- DfT category: B
- Number of platforms: 6 operational; 1 disused
- Accessible: Yes
- Fare zone: C

National Rail annual entry and exit
- 2020–21: ▼1.063 million
- Interchange: ▼0.440 million
- 2021–22: ▲2.864 million
- Interchange: ▲0.941 million
- 2022–23: ▲5.106 million
- Interchange: ▲1.057 million
- 2023–24: ▲6.519 million
- Interchange: ▲1.084 million
- 2024–25: ▼5.815 million
- Interchange: ▼1.071 million

Railway companies
- Original company: Eastern Counties Railway
- Pre-grouping: Great Eastern Railway
- Post-grouping: London and North Eastern Railway

Key dates
- 29 March 1843: Opened as Shenfield
- March 1850: Closed
- 1 January 1887: Reopened as Shenfield & Hutton Junction
- 20 February 1969: Renamed Shenfield

Other information
- External links: Departures; Facilities
- Coordinates: 51.6307°N 0.3301°E

Shenfield railway station is on the Great Eastern Main Line in the East of England, serving the suburb of Shenfield, Essex. As well as being a key interchange for medium- and long-distance services on the main line, it is also the western terminus of the Shenfield to Southend Line branch line and one of two eastern termini of the Elizabeth line. The station is 20 miles 16 chains (32.51 km) down the line from Liverpool Street; it is situated between Brentwood and either Ingatestone on the main line or Billericay on the branch line.

The station sees trains operated by Greater Anglia to main line destinations including London Liverpool Street, Chelmsford, Colchester and Ipswich; as well as branch line stations such as Southend Victoria, Southminster, Braintree, Harwich Town, Colchester Town and Clacton-on-Sea. Elizabeth line services stop at all stations westbound towards Liverpool Street, London Paddington and Heathrow Terminal 5.

== History ==
Shenfield station was opened by the Eastern Counties Railway company on 29 March 1843, on the extension from Brentwood to Colchester. As it was situated in a rural area, patronage was low, so it was closed in March 1850. It reopened with the name Shenfield & Hutton Junction on 1 January 1887, under the Great Eastern Railway to serve as an interchange station with the new Shenfield to Southend Line that was completed two years later. There were three platforms: two up (London-bound) and one down (country-bound). Under the London and North Eastern Railway, two extra tracks for terminating local (suburban "metro") trains opened in 1934, resulting in five platforms.

The 1920 survey of the station shows goods sidings and a turntable on the London side of the up platforms. The goods yard was closed on 4 May 1964 and it became the station's car park. The Hutton Junction suffix in the station's name was removed on 20 February 1969.

Immediately west of the station is Brentwood bank, which descends steeply in the up direction. This bank presented a significant climb to steam trains. There are extensive sidings on the up side of the station just before the start of the descent down the bank.

To the east of the station, the lines for Southend diverge to the south. West of Shenfield, there are five tracks, but these split to the east: two towards Colchester and two towards Southend Victoria. The London and North Eastern Railway opened the Southend Loop to the east of the station on 1 January 1934. This enabled Southend trains to and from platforms 4 and 5 to dive-under the main line, thus eliminating conflicting movements. The bi-directional loop line connects to the Southend line at Mountnessing Junction.

The lines from London Liverpool Street and London Fenchurch Street (via Gas Factory Junction and Bow Junction) to Shenfield were electrified at 1,500 V DC overhead system in 1949. This was converted to 6.5 kV AC in 1960. Gidea Park to Shenfield was converted to 25 kV AC in 1976. Liverpool Street to Gidea Park was converted to 25 kV AC in 1980.

Oyster card readers were installed for pay-as-you-go journeys in 2013.

== Layout ==
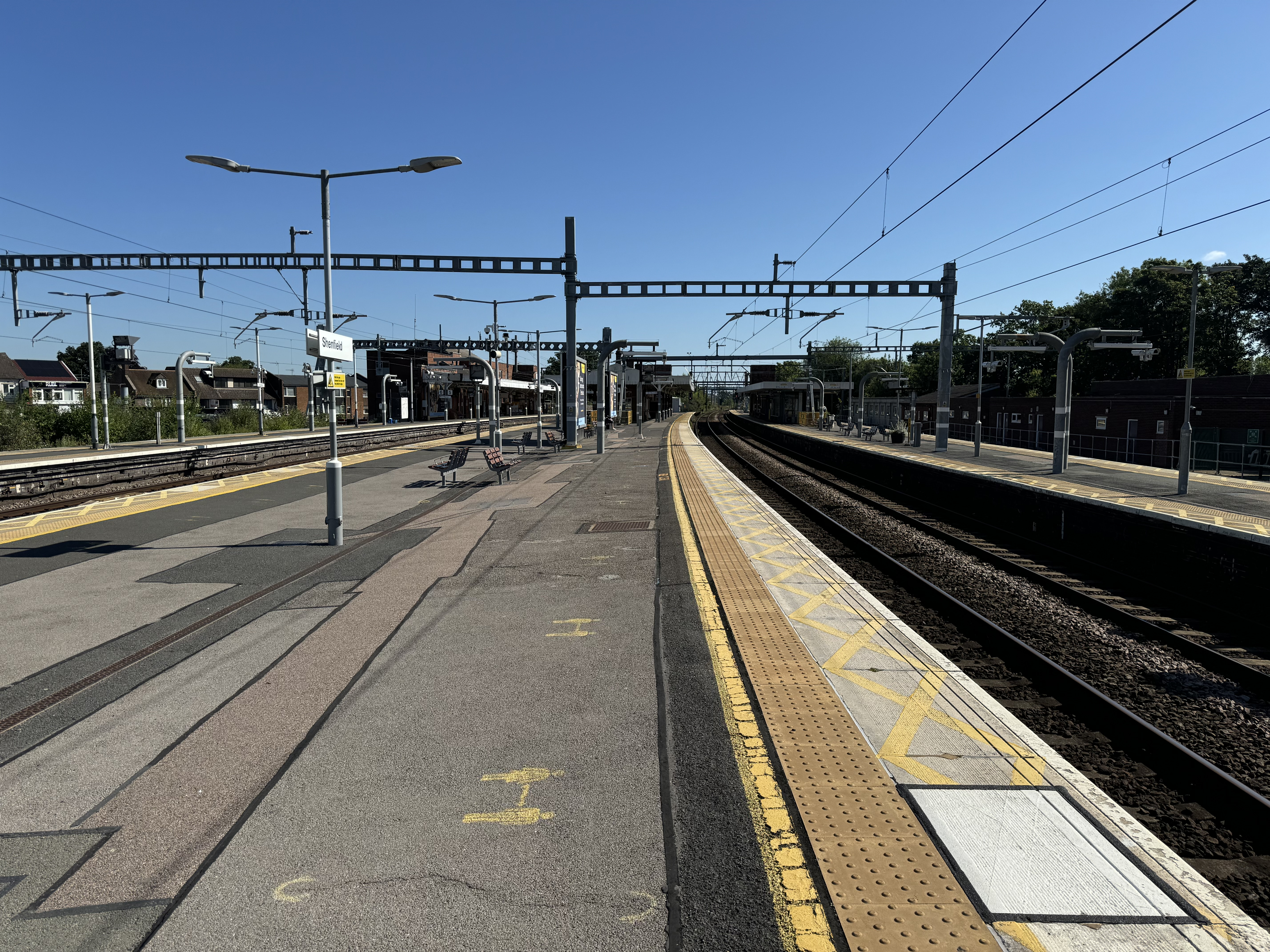
A view of the platforms, seen from platform 3 (June 2024)

The station expanded from its original three platforms in 1843 to the current six.

Platforms are normally used as follows:

1. Westbound up services to London from the Shenfield-Southend line
2. Westbound up services to London on the Great Eastern Main Line
3. Northbound down services to Chelmsford and beyond on the Great Eastern Main Line
4. Eastbound down services to Southend onto the Shenfield-Southend line
5. Westbound up services to London on the Elizabeth line
6. Westbound up services to London on the Elizabeth line.

At peak hours, the frequency of services increase from eight trains per hour to 12, which necessitated the construction of a new 210 m-long (690 ft) platform 6, which was built to the north of platform 5 and replaced one of the existing three western sidings. The two remaining western sidings and three new eastern sidings are also used by the Elizabeth line. Platforms 1 to 5 have an operational length for 12 carriages, platform 6 for ten carriages.

== Services ==
Shenfield is served by two train operating companies; the typical off-peak service pattern in trains per hour (tph) is:

Greater Anglia:

- 7 tph to London Liverpool Street; of which:
  - 5 call at Stratford
  - 2 call at Romford and Stratford
- 3 tph to Southend Victoria, calling at all stations
- 1 tph to Braintree, calling at Ingatestone, Chelmsford, Witham and then all stations
- 1 tph to Clacton-on-Sea, calling at Ingatestone, Chelmsford, Witham, Colchester, Hythe, Wivenhoe and Thorpe-le-Soken
- 1 tph to Colchester Town, calling at Chelmsford, Beaulieu Park, Witham and then all stations
- 1 tph to Ipswich, calling at Chelmsford and then all stations.

Elizabeth line:

- 2 tph to Heathrow Terminal 5, calling at all stations except Acton Main Line, Hanwell and Southall
- 6 tph to London Paddington, calling at all stations.

During peak times, service frequencies may be increased and calling patterns varied; they are generally reduced on Sundays.

Preceding station	National Rail	Following station
Romford or Stratford	Greater Anglia Great Eastern Main Line	Ingatestone or Chelmsford
Romford or Stratford	Greater Anglia Shenfield–Southend line	Billericay
Preceding station	Elizabeth line	Following station
Brentwood towards Heathrow Terminal 5	Elizabeth line	Terminus
