= Southend Victoria railway station =

Railway station in Essex, England

Coordinates: 51°32′30″N 0°42′40″E

Southend Victoria
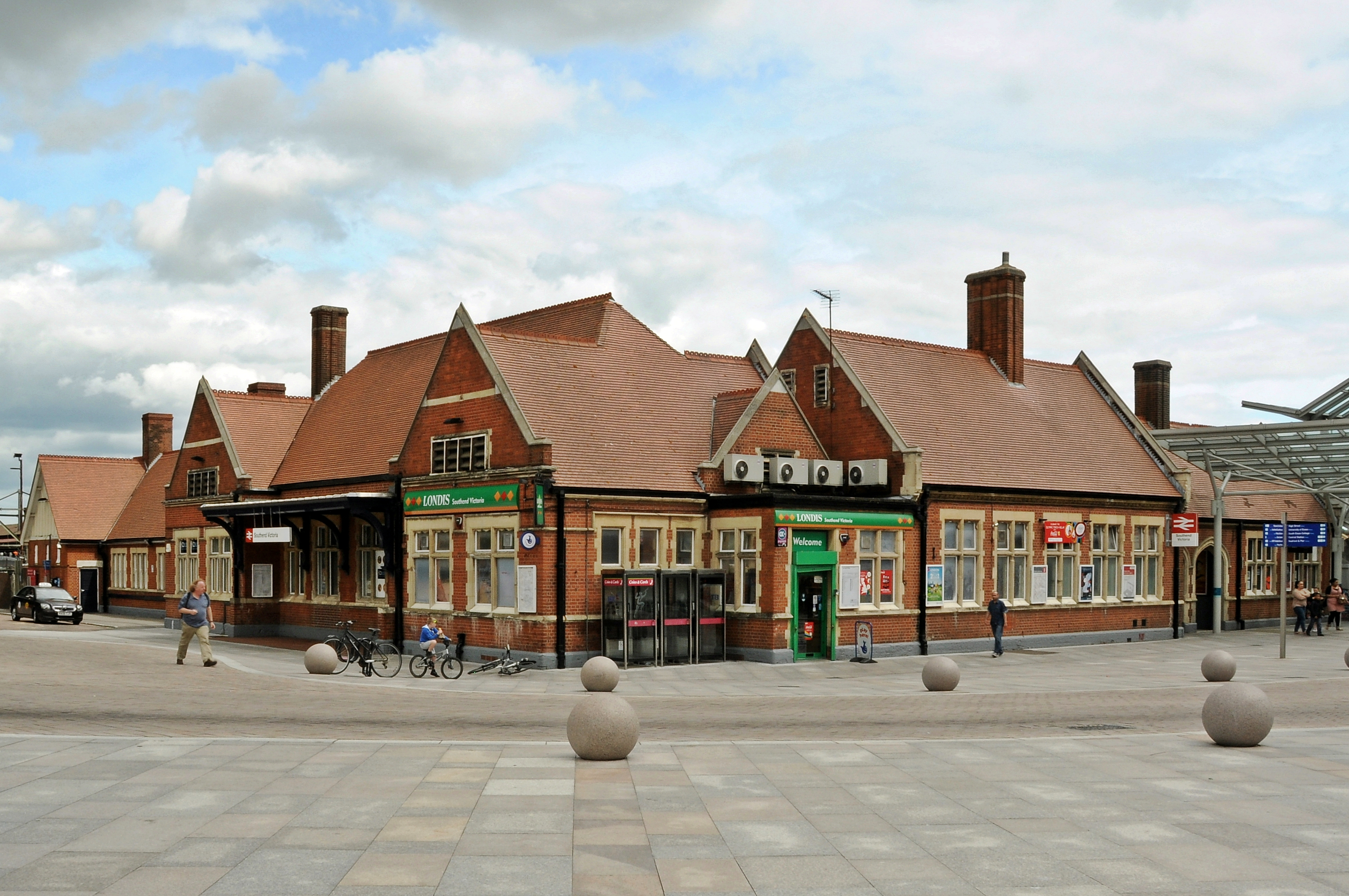
- Station building and main entrance, July 2012

General information
- Location: Southend-on-Sea, City of Southend-on-Sea; England
- Grid reference: TQ881860
- Managed by: Greater Anglia
- Platforms: 4

Other information
- Station code: SOV
- Classification: DfT category C1

History
- Original company: Great Eastern Railway
- Pre-grouping: Great Eastern Railway
- Post-grouping: London and North Eastern Railway

Key dates
- 1 October 1889: Opened as Southend-on-Sea
- 1915: Renamed Southend-on-Sea for Westcliff and Thorpe Bay
- 1 May 1949: Renamed Southend-on-Sea Victoria
- 20 February 1969: Renamed Southend Victoria

Passengers
- 2020/21: ▼0.560 million
- Interchange: 1,587
- 2021/22: ▲1.101 million
- Interchange: ▲2,285
- 2022/23: ▲1.262 million
- Interchange: ▼2,049
- 2023/24: ▲1.263 million
- Interchange: ▲2,735
- 2024/25: ▲1.386 million
- Interchange: ▼0
Location
Notes
- Passenger statistics from the Office of Rail and Road

Southend Victoria railway station is the eastern terminus of the Shenfield to Southend Line, a branch off the Great Eastern Main Line, in the East of England. It is one of two primary stations that serve the resort city of Southend-on-Sea, Essex; the other is Southend Central on the London, Tilbury and Southend line. It is located 41 miles 42 chains (66.83 km) down the line from London Liverpool Street; the preceding station on the line is Prittlewell. Services from Southend Victoria join the Great Eastern Main Line for London at Shenfield and are operated by Greater Anglia.

== History ==
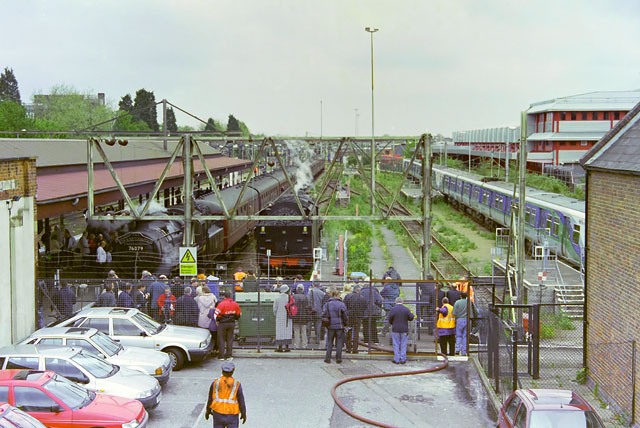
Two steam locomotives, as well as two Class 321s, seen at the station in 2002

The line from Wickford to Southend Victoria, including this station, was opened on 1 October 1889. Victoria had four platforms. Platforms 1 and 4 had run-round loops whilst an engine release road was located between platforms 2 and 3. The station building was built by GER arcitect W. N. Ashbee and were in his "New Essex" style characterised by red brick, tiled gables and elaborate timber canopies.

There was a goods yard to the east of the station, which closed on 5 June 1967.

Between 1915 and 1949 the station was named Southend for Westcliffe & Thorpe Bay.

The station was renamed Southend-on-Sea Victoria on 1 May 1949 and the name was further changed to Southend Victoria on 20 February 1969.

Electrification of the Shenfield to Southend Victoria line using 1.5 kV DC overhead line electrification (OLE) was completed on 31 December 1956. This was changed to 6.25 kV AC in November 1960 and to 25 kV AC on 25 January 1979.

To work the newly electrified line British Railways built 32 Class AM7 4-car EMU units at Eastleigh Works. These were later reclassified as Class 307 units and continued in service until a final commemoration run from Southend Victoria on 30 June 1990. Electrification certainly attracted the travelling public with patronage doubling from the branch in the first year of electric operations.

=== Goods yard ===
In the 1950s there was about 80 wagons a day spread over 5 trains that mostly operated from Goodmayes Goods Yard.

The goods yard was closed on 5 June 1967 and replaced by a coal concentration depot operated by the National Coal Board. This was originally shunted by a John Fowler locomotive and later by a former British Rail Class 03 shunter. The depot closed in 1986.

Withdrawn steam engines were stored in the carriage sidings before they were moved to the scrapyard.

== Facilities ==
The station has a ticket office and ticket machines, a car park, toilets, departure boards, a coffee shop and vending machines, and cycle storage.

== Passenger volume ==
Passenger volume at Southend Victoria
| | 2004–05 | 2005–06 | 2006–07 | 2007–08 | 2008–09 | 2009–10 | 2010–11 | 2011–12 | 2012–13 | 2013–14 | 2014–15 | 2015–16 | 2016–17 | 2017–18 | 2018–19 | 2019–20 | 2020–21 | 2021–22 | 2022–23 | 2023–24 | 2024–25 |
|---|---|---|---|---|---|---|---|---|---|---|---|---|---|---|---|---|---|---|---|---|---|
| Entries and exits | 1,369,216 | 1,719,370 | 4,139,144 | 3,965,669 | 3,949,945 | 3,718,148 | 3,746,115 | 3,656,326 | 3,640,338 | 3,726,874 | 1,358,773 | 1,439,480 | 1,877,587 | 2,098,651 | 2,129,590 | 1,719,086 | 559,604 | 1,101,256 | 1,261,540 | 1,263,120 | 1,385,546 |
| Interchanges | 276 | 357 | 433 | 735 | 366 | 974 | 1,176 | 2,465 | 2,530 | 2,449 | 5,734 | 3,189 | 3,621 | 3,297 | 3,627 | 5,308 | 1,587 | 2,285 | 2,049 | 2,735 | 0 |

The statistics cover twelve month periods that start in April.

== Services ==
=== Historic ===
By 1912 eight Southend expresses were making the journey to Liverpool Street in under 61 minutes. Author (and former GER employee) C J Allen had the opinion that this timetable led to the development of some of the intermediate locations such as Wickford and Rochford.

In 1938 Southend enjoyed 48 trains on weekdays and 41 on Sundays but services were reduced during World War II.

=== Current ===
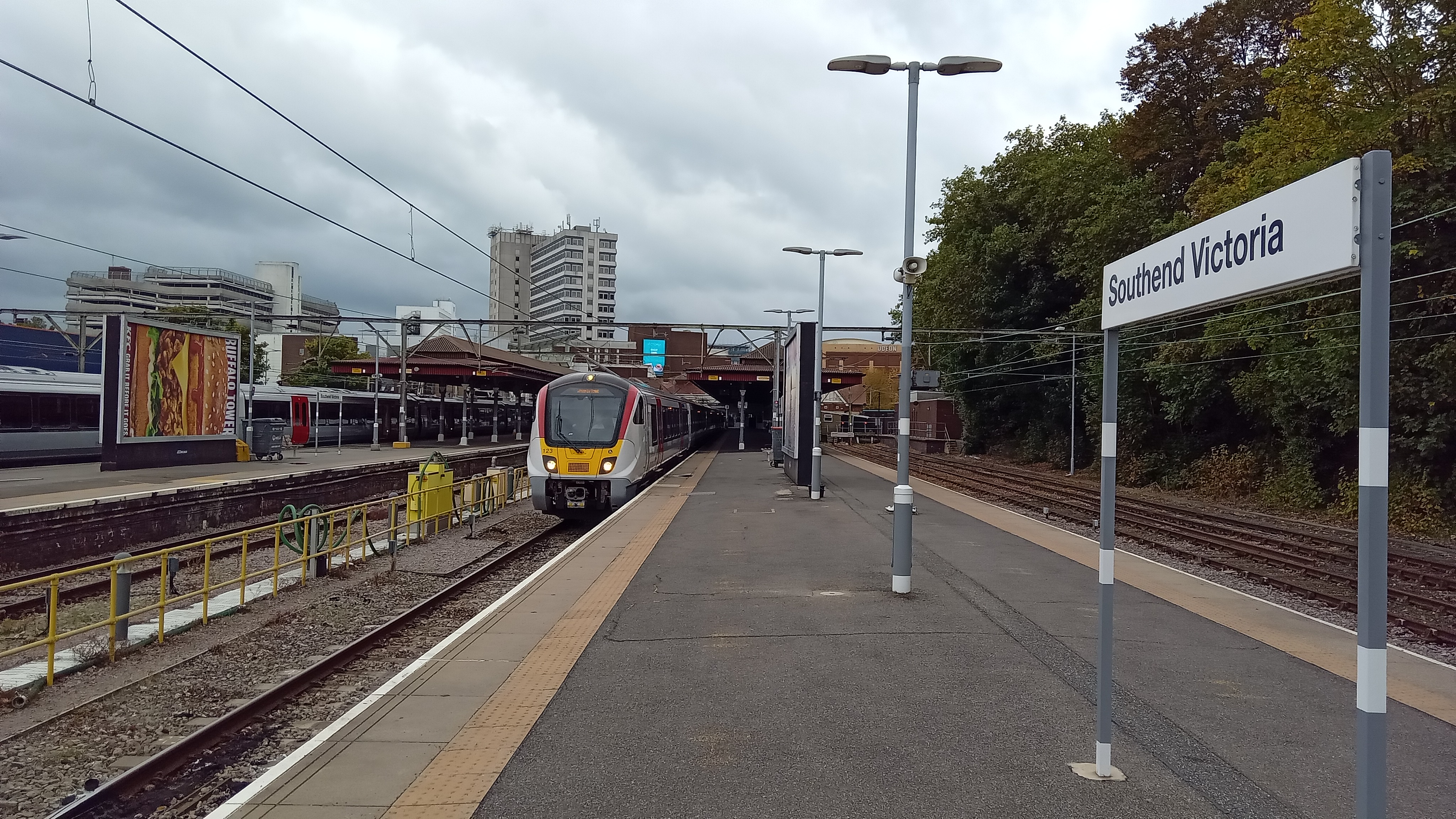
A Class 720 standing at the station

The station is managed by Greater Anglia, which also operates all trains serving it. The typical Monday to Saturday off-peak service is of three trains per hour to Liverpool Street. On Sundays, there are typically two trains per hour to Liverpool Street.

| Preceding station | National Rail | Following station |
|---|---|---|
| Prittlewell | Greater Anglia; Shenfield–Southend line | Terminus |

== Community rail ==
The station, as with all stations on the line, is part of the Essex & South Suffolk Community Rail Partnership.

== Bibliography ==
- Quick, Michael (2023). Railway Passenger Stations in Great Britain: A Chronology (PDF) (5th ed.). London: Railway and Canal Historical Society.
