= Goodmayes railway station =

National Rail station in London, England

Goodmayes
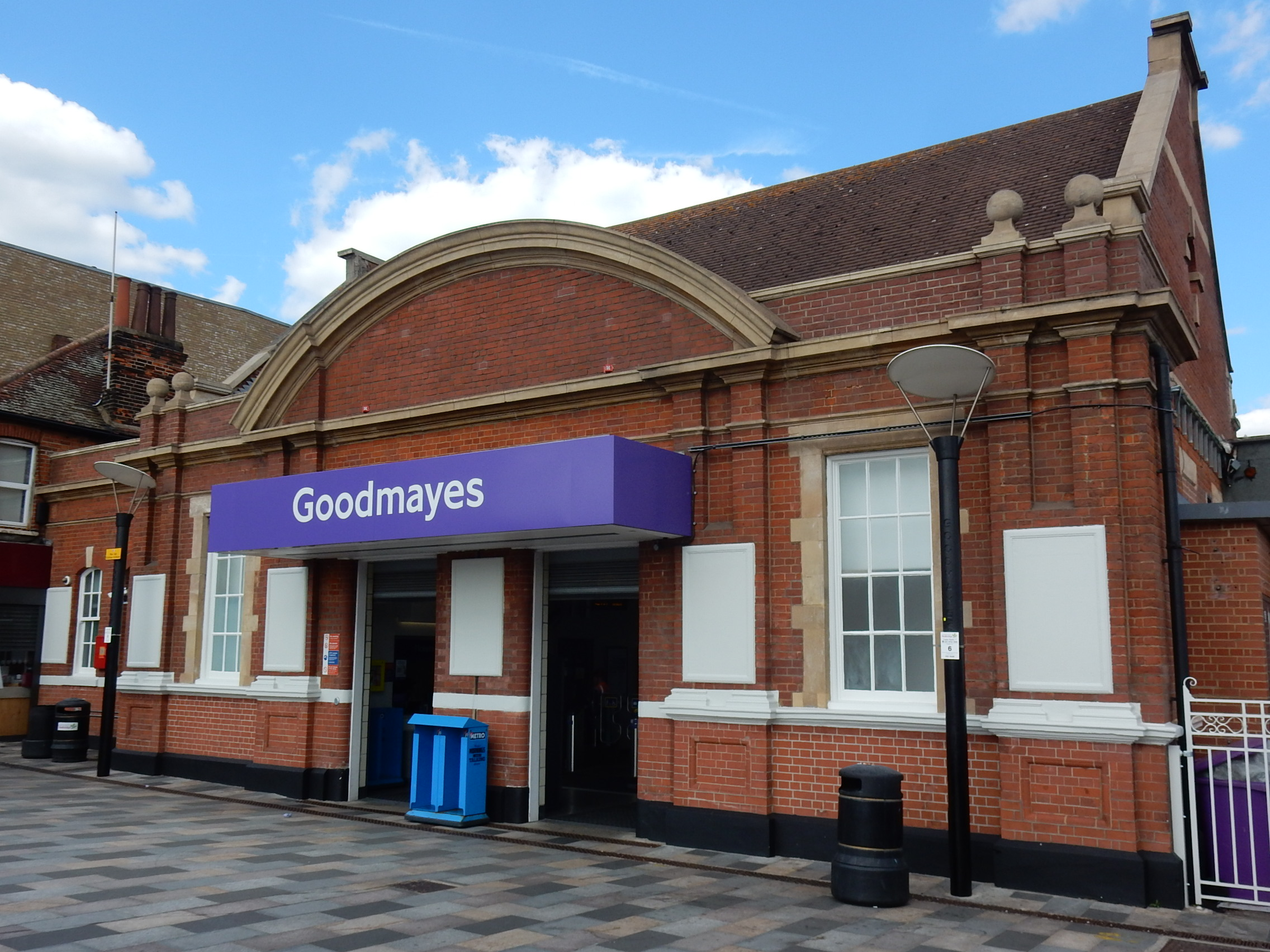
- Station entrance seen in June 2022
- Interactive map of Goodmayes

General information
- Location: Goodmayes
- Local authority: London Borough of Redbridge
- Managed by: Elizabeth line
- Owner: Network Rail
- Station code: GMY
- Number of platforms: 4
- Accessible: Yes
- Fare zone: 4

National Rail annual entry and exit
- 2020–21: ▼1.387 million
- 2021–22: ▲2.470 million
- 2022–23: ▲4.131 million
- 2023–24: ▲5.794 million
- 2024–25: ▼4.773 million

Key dates
- 8 February 1901: Opened

Other information
- External links: Departures; Facilities
- Coordinates: 51.5655°N 0.1109°E

Goodmayes railway station is on the Great Eastern Main Line serving the district of Goodmayes in the London Borough of Redbridge, east London. It is 9 miles 23 chains (14.9 km) down the line from London Liverpool Street and is situated between Seven Kings and Chadwell Heath. Its three-letter station code is GMY, and it is in London fare zone 4.

The station was opened in 1901 by the Great Eastern Railway. It is managed and served by the Elizabeth line.

== History ==
Goodmayes station was opened on 8 February 1901 by the Great Eastern Railway (GER) on the Great Eastern Main Line out of London Liverpool Street at the same time as the line between Seven Kings and Romford was being upgraded from 2 tracks to 4 tracks.

Although delayed by World War 2, electrification of the local tracks of the Great Eastern line between Liverpool Street and Shenfield finally opened on 7 November 1949 and steam-hauled trains using articulated carriages and N7 tank engines were replaced by Class 306 Electric Multiple Units. These in turn were replaced by Class 315 units from 1980.

=== Yards and connections ===
There was an extensive freight yard for goods traffic on the down side of the line which extended from the station building a considerable distance towards Chadwell Heath. This was a busy yard with a signal box controlling movements, and after 1900 a turntable and water tower were added, and part of the yard was given over to Permanent Way maintenance. The yard closed in 1962 and after the tracks were removed the land was grassed until replaced by a supermarket, other shops and housing.

At the end of the 19th Century a short line extended from the eastern end of the yard and curved away under the High Road to a gravel pit. This line was still extant in 1914 but had been removed by 1938 when housing covered the area.

Early in the 20th Century a large yard was constructed on the up side of the line extending as far as Kinfauns Road. Associated with this was the Becontree Estate Railway which built to transport materials that were used in construction of the Becontree Estate, although this was removed after construction of the estate was completed.

=== Elizabeth line ===
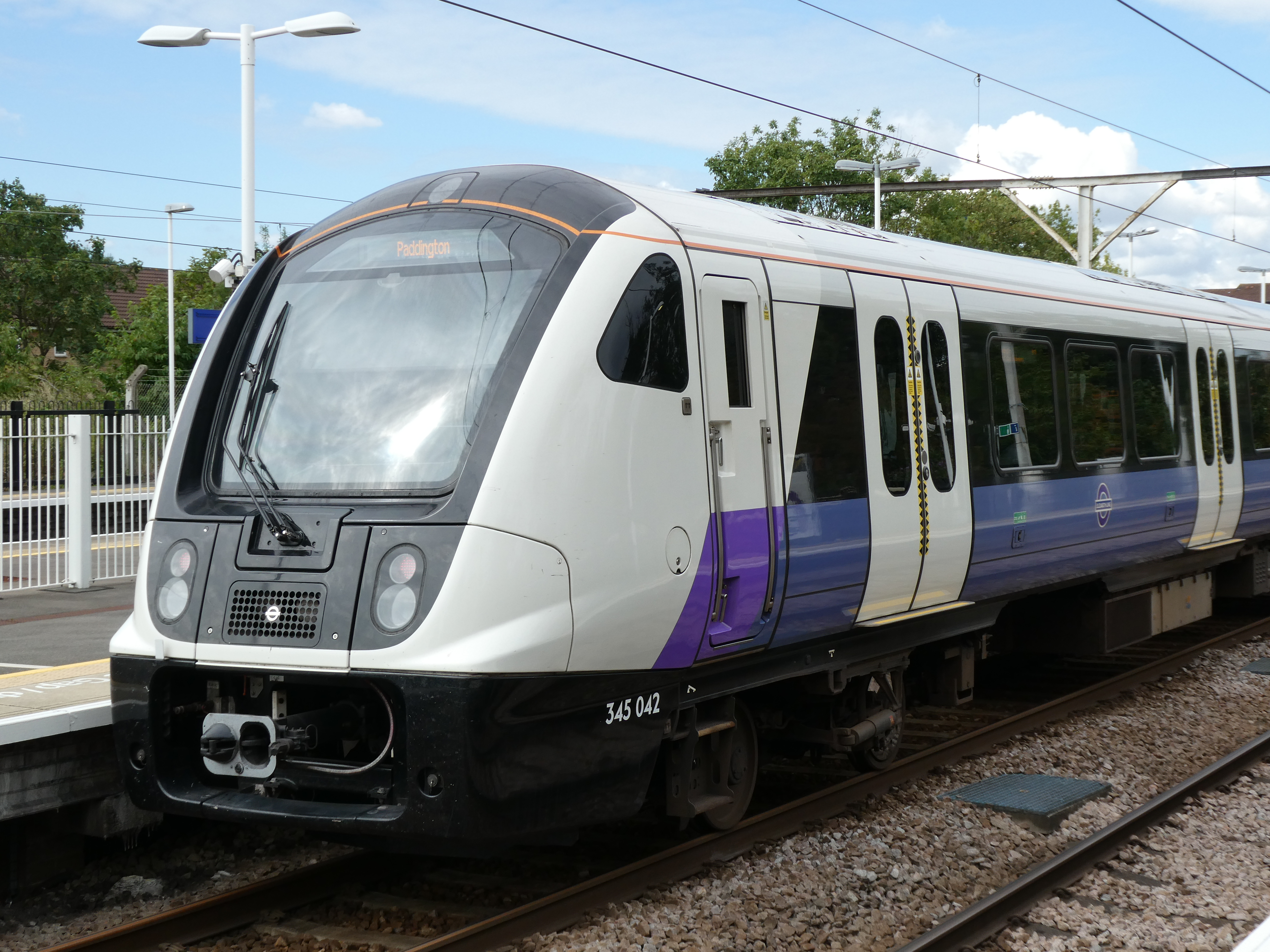
Elizabeth Line Class 345 EMU at Goodmayes

In 2017 new Class 345 trains entered operation on the Shenfield – London Liverpool Street route as the line created by the Crossrail project partially opened. The four platforms at Goodmayes have been extended from their current length of 184 metres (201 yd) to accommodate the new trains, which are over 200 metres (220 yd) long at their full nine carriage length. The station also received three new lifts providing access to all platforms, improved lighting and signage, help points, and new ticket machines and gates within a refurbished ticket hall.

== Location ==
The station is located on Goodmayes Road in the London Borough of Redbridge.

London Buses routes 364 and EL3 serve the station.

== Services ==
=== Historic ===
After electrification in 1949 an even off-peak service pattern of three trains each way per hour evenly spaced was introduced. In 1952 the down trains were at 12, 32 and 52 minutes past the hour, all trains going to Gidea Park, while in peak hours there were additional trains, some running to/from Shenfield. Over 30 years later the pattern had not altered significantly so that in 1984 there were:

- 3 tph (2 tph on Sundays) to Gidea Park calling at Chadwell Heath, Romford and Gidea Park.
- 3 tph (2 tph on Sundays) to Liverpool Street calling at Seven Kings, Ilford, Manor Park, Forest Gate, Maryland, Stratford and Liverpool Street. These trains all originated from Gidea Park

Down trains ran at 17, 37 and 57 minutes past the hour Mondays-Saturdays between 05:17 and 23:37 with additional trains in the rush hour. On Sundays the trains ran at 19 and 49 minutes past the hour. Overnight there were two trains to Shenfield, one train to Chelmsford and one train to Southend Victoria. All of these trains originated at Liverpool Street and called at all stations.

Up trains ran at 06, 26 and 46 minutes past the hour Mondays-Saturdays between 05:06 and 23:46 with additional trains in the rush hour. On Sundays the trains ran at 16 and 46 minutes past the hour. Overnight there were two trains from Southend Victoria, one train from Shenfield and one train from Chelmsford. These all called at all stations from their point of origin to Liverpool Street.

=== Current ===
All services at Goodmayes are operated by the Elizabeth line using Class 345 EMUs.

The typical Monday to Friday off-peak service in trains per hour is:

- 8 tph to London Paddington of which 2 continue to Heathrow Terminal 5
- 8 tph to Shenfield

During the peak hours, the station is served by a number of additional services between London Liverpool Street and Gidea Park. These services do not call at Whitechapel.

On Sundays, the service to and from Shenfield is reduced to 4 tph, with alternating services running only as far as Gidea Park.

Preceding station	Elizabeth line	Following station
Seven Kings towards Heathrow Terminal 5	Elizabeth line	Chadwell Heath towards Shenfield
