= Chadwell Heath railway station =

Railway station in London, England

Chadwell Heath
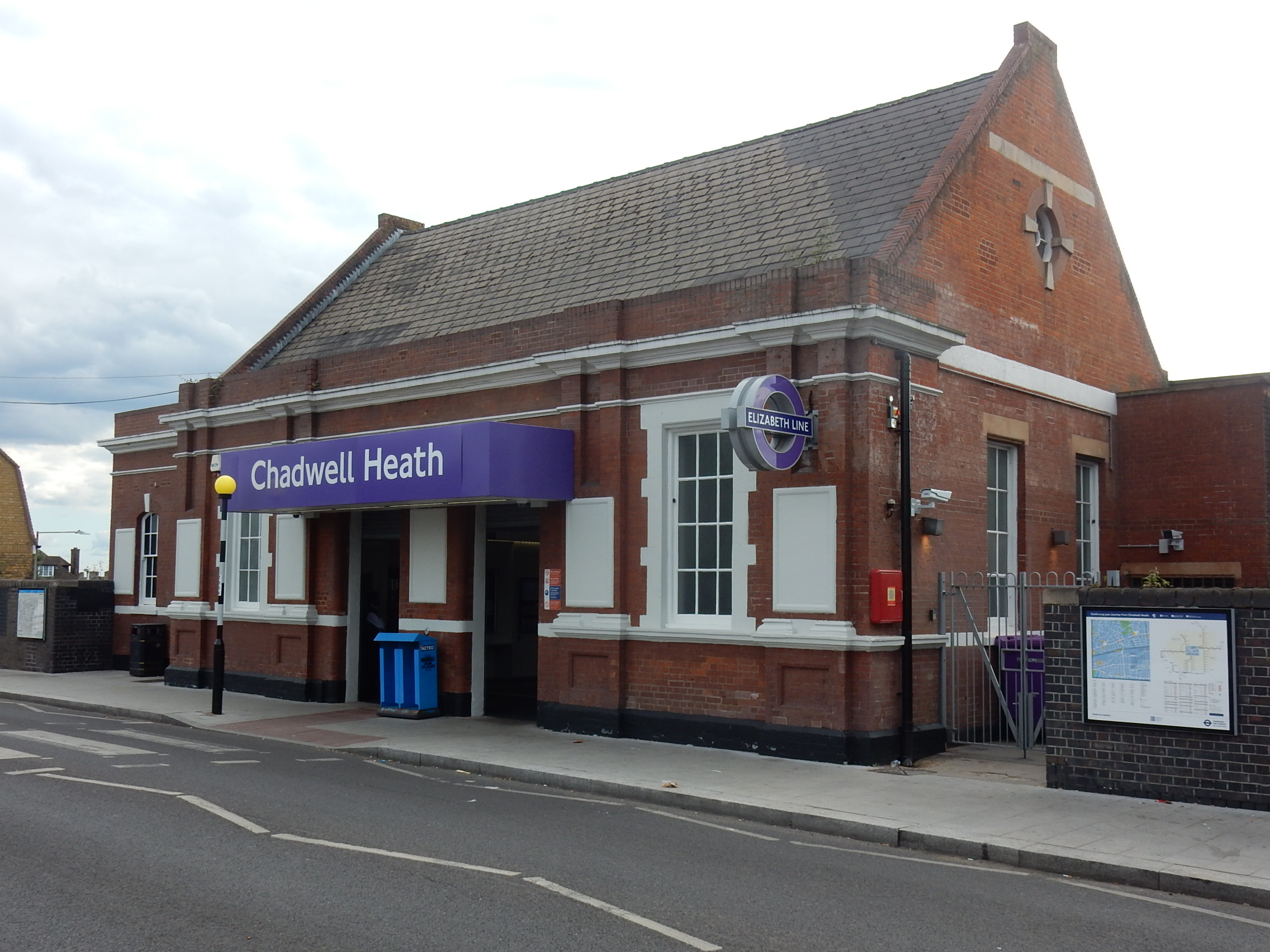
- Station entrance seen in July 2022
- Interactive map of Chadwell Heath

General information
- Location: Chadwell Heath
- Local authority: London Borough of Redbridge
- Managed by: Elizabeth line
- Owner: Network Rail
- Station code: CTH
- Number of platforms: 4
- Accessible: Yes
- Fare zone: 5

National Rail annual entry and exit
- 2020–21: ▼1.510 million
- 2021–22: ▲2.746 million
- 2022–23: ▲4.500 million
- 2023–24: ▲5.970 million
- 2024–25: ▼4.874 million

Key dates
- 11 January 1864: Opened

Other information
- External links: Departures; Facilities
- Coordinates: 51.5678°N 0.1292°E

Chadwell Heath railway station is a stop on the Great Eastern Main Line in Chadwell Heath, which straddles the London Boroughs of Redbridge and Barking & Dagenham in East London, England. It is 9 miles 79 chains (16.1 km) down the line from London Liverpool Street and is situated between Goodmayes and Romford. Its three-letter station code is CTH and it is in London fare zone 5.

The station was opened in 1864 by the Great Eastern Railway (GER) on the line between London and Romford built by the Eastern Counties Railway in 1839 (extended in 1840 to Brentwood and thereafter to Colchester and Norwich); the GER had taken over the line in 1862. The station is currently managed and served by the Elizabeth line.

== History ==
=== Great Eastern Railway (1864–1922) ===
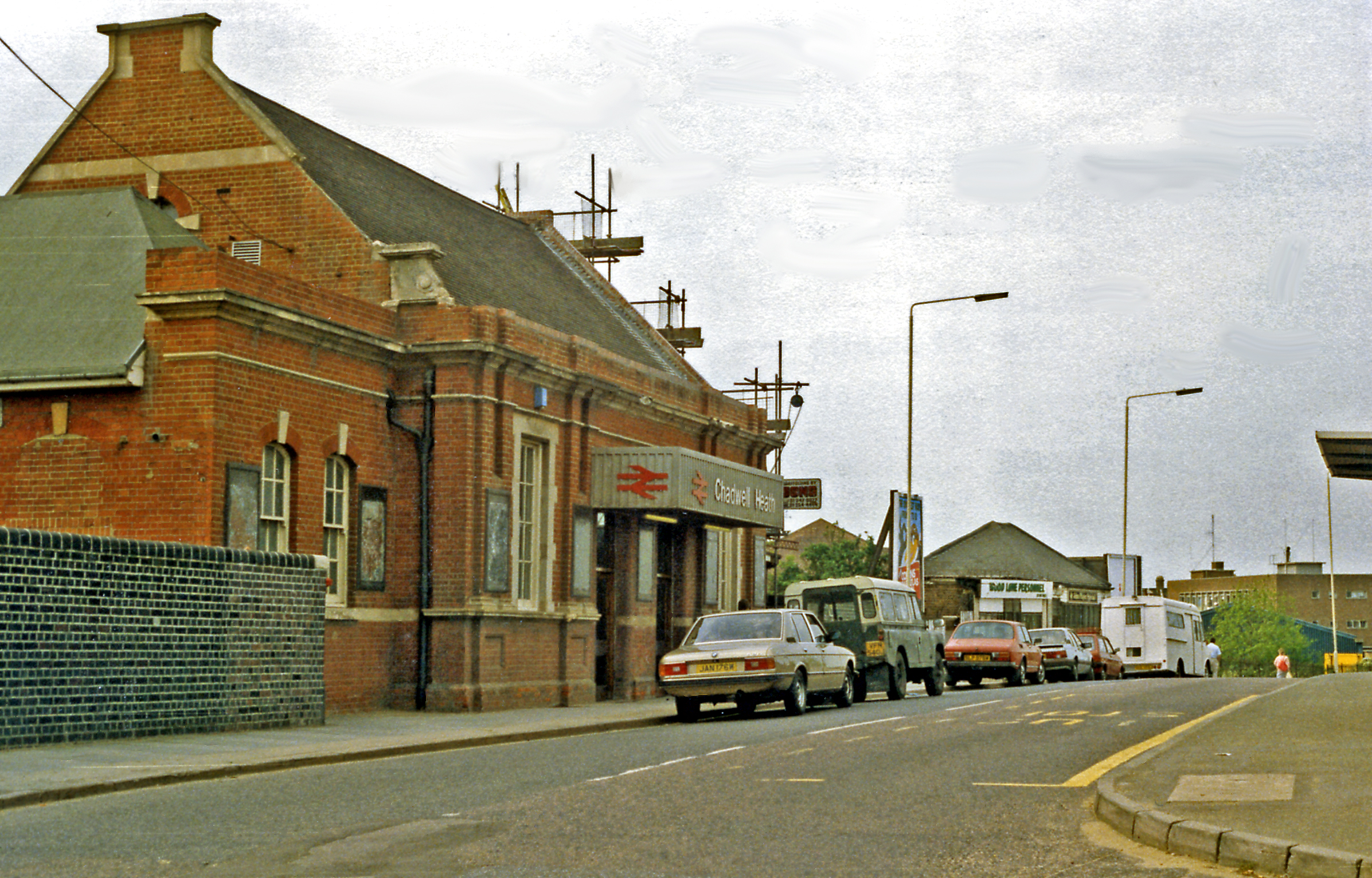
Chadwell Heath station building in 1988

Chadwell Heath station was opened on 11 January 1864 and is built on the site of Wangey House, one of Dagenham's oldest buildings dating back to 1250. Wangey House was partly demolished when the Eastern Counties Railway built the line in the 1830s; the last surviving portion was demolished when the Great Eastern Railway widened the line in 1901.

Chadwell Heath had just two platforms linked by a footbridge when it opened in 1864; a Great Eastern Railway mid-Victorian single-storey ticket office was attached to a two-storey station master’s house at platform level, fronting a station approach leading down from what was then called Chitty’s Lane (now Station Road) which crossed the tracks on an overbridge. A simple open waiting shelter with projecting canopy sheltered the London-bound platform. All of this was swept away in 1900, when the line was quadrupled between Ilford and Romford in 1899-1902; a new station with four platforms was opened in 1901. The ticket office was relocated over the tracks and was the same design as Seven Kings and Goodmayes; a dual-pitched roof structure of red brick with stone dressings, a semi-circular pediment above the entrance which was sheltered by a generous twin-arched canopy; miniature arched pediments topping the end gables.

A signal box existed between the two sets of running lines and this controlled access to the east end of Goodmayes Goods Yard which stretched from Chadwell Heath to Goodmayes station.

At the other end of the station, Chadwell Heath had a small goods yard that predominantly dealt with domestic coal traffic and this had a small signal box controlling access.

In 1923, the GER amalgamated with other railways to form the London and North Eastern Railway (LNER).

=== London and North Eastern Railway (1923–1947) ===
Chadwell Heath was the focus for the housing estate temporary railway built for the construction of the Becontree estate in the period 1926–33.

The housing estate was not well served by public transport and, by the mid 1930s, 24 trains were operating towards London between 05:30 and 09:48 in the morning.

During this period, local stopping trains were generally hauled by LNER Class N7 locomotives on trains of corridor type carriage stock.

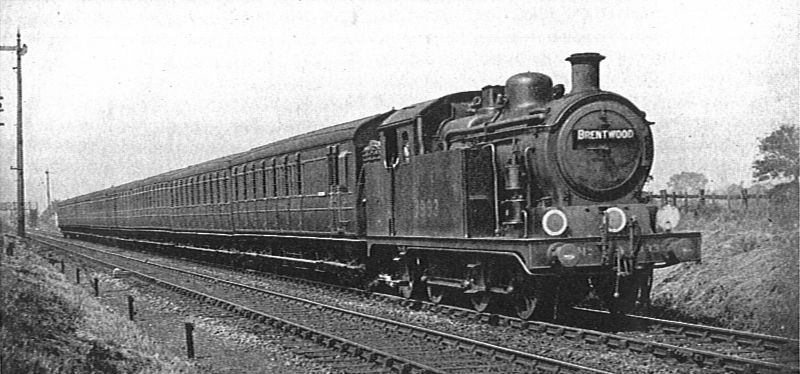
A typical LNER Suburban train, GER section of the LNER (CJ Allen, Steel Highway, 1928)

Plans were drawn up in the 1930s to electrify the suburban lines from Liverpool Street to Shenfield at 1,500 V DC and work was started on implementing this. However, the outbreak of the Second World War brought the project to a temporary halt and it was not until 1949 that the scheme was completed.

The station suffered a direct bomb hit in April 1941, which wrecked platform 1 and the footbridge, and damaged the ticket office. The damage was repaired but the damaged semi-circular pediments to the ticket office façade and the end gables were all removed; a simple box-style canopy replaced the elaborate late Victorian original.

=== British Railways (1948–1994) ===
On 1 January 1948, following nationalisation of the railways, Chadwell Heath became part of the British Railways Eastern Region.

The electrification scheme saw the two signal boxes closed as the signalling was upgraded. First to close was Chadwell Heath Goods Yard box on 26 August 1949, followed by Chadwell Heath on 10 July 1949. The area was covered by a new box.

From February 1949, the Class 306 electric multiple units (EMUs) operated the service to steam timings, but an accelerated all electric schedule was introduced in September 1949.

During the 1960s, the goods yard and Goodmayes freight yard were both closed.

The signal box, dating from 1949, closed in June 1972 with responsibility for signalling the area passing to Goodmayes.

In 1980, the first Class 315 EMUs were introduced to replace the Class 306s. The 315s were in service until 2022 and were used on passenger trains serving Chadwell Heath. Around this time, many of the 1901 platform buildings were demolished.

The stopping services usually call at platforms 3 and 4, whilst platforms 1 and 2 are used by longer distance services to/from Colchester, Clacton, Ipswich and Norwich.

The railway was sectorised in 1982; Chadwell Heath and the trains calling at it became part of the London and South-East sector. On 10 June 1986, this was rebranded to become Network SouthEast which was responsible for working services up to privatisation.

=== Privatisation Era (1994 - present day) ===
In April 1994, Railtrack became responsible for the maintenance of the infrastructure; it was succeeded by Network Rail in 2002.

Between privatisation on 1 April 1994 and 4 January 1997, the station was operated by a non-privatised business unit.

Passenger services calling at the station have been operated by the following franchises:

- First Great Eastern: 5 January 1997 – 31 March 2004
- National Express East Anglia: 1 April 2004 – 4 February 2012
- Abellio Greater Anglia: 5 February 2012 – 30 May 2015
- MTR TFL Rail: 31 May 2015 - 23 May 2022; after which the line was rebranded as the Elizabeth line which is the current operator.

In June 2017, new Class 345 trains began entering service in preparation for the completion of the Crossrail project to build the Elizabeth line. As of March 2023, the four platforms at Chadwell Heath station have been extended from their previous length of 184 metres (201 yd) to accommodate the Elizabeth line trains, which are over 200 metres (220 yd) long as they have been extended to nine carriages. New lifts, signage, help points, customer information screens and CCTV were installed. Additionally, a new passing loop for freight traffic was constructed to the west of the station, to replace the disused loop further up the line at Manor Park.

Initially, Elizabeth Line services from Chadwell Heath operated into Liverpool Street only; on 22 November 2022, services were able to operate through central London and onto Reading.

== Services ==
All services at Chadwell Heath are operated by the Elizabeth line using Class 345 electric multiple units.

The typical Monday to Friday off-peak service in trains per hour is:

- 8 tph to London Paddington, of which 2 continue to Heathrow Terminal 5
- 8 tph to Shenfield

During peak hours, the station is served by a number of additional services between Liverpool Street and Gidea Park; these services do not call at Whitechapel.

On Sundays, the service to and from Shenfield is reduced to 4 tph, with alternating services running only as far as Gidea Park.

Preceding station	Elizabeth line	Following station
Goodmayes towards Heathrow Terminal 5	Elizabeth line	Romford towards Shenfield

== Connections ==
London Buses routes 62 and 368 serve the station by the nearby Chadwell Heath station bus stop.
