= Seven Kings railway station =

National Rail station in Ilford, England

Seven Kings
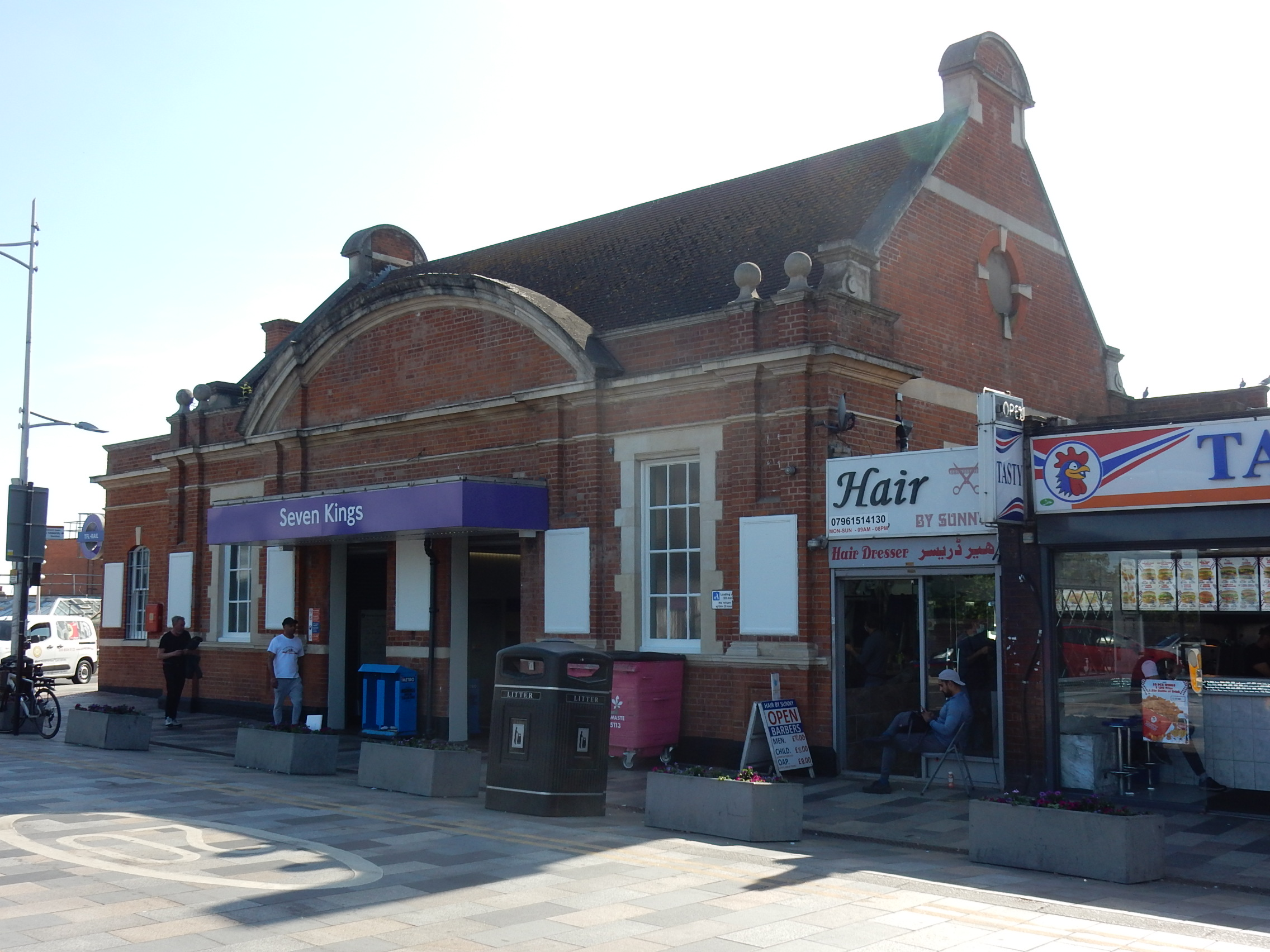
- Station entrance seen in May 2022
- Interactive map of Seven Kings

General information
- Location: Seven Kings
- Local authority: London Borough of Redbridge
- Managed by: Elizabeth line
- Owner: Network Rail
- Station code: SVK
- Number of platforms: 4
- Accessible: Yes
- Fare zone: 4

National Rail annual entry and exit
- 2020–21: ▼1.286 million
- 2021–22: ▲2.317 million
- 2022–23: ▲3.782 million
- 2023–24: ▲5.080 million
- 2024–25: ▼4.084 million

Key dates
- 1 March 1899: Opened

Other information
- External links: Departures; Facilities
- Coordinates: 51.5635°N 0.0969°E

Seven Kings railway station is on the Great Eastern Main Line, serving the district of Seven Kings in the London Borough of Redbridge, east London. It is 8 miles 46 chains (13.8 km) down the line from London Liverpool Street and is situated between Ilford and Goodmayes. Its three-letter station code is SVK and it is in London fare zone 4. The station was opened on 1 March 1899 by the Great Eastern Railway. It is currently managed by the Elizabeth line, which operates services between Shenfield and Heathrow Terminal 5.

== History ==
=== Great Eastern Railway (1873–1922) ===
The railway through the site of Seven Kings station was first built in 1839 by the Eastern Counties Railway, as the first part of what was later to become the Great Eastern Main Line. Trains initially ran between Mile End and Romford.

By the 1860s, the railways in East Anglia were in financial trouble and most were leased to the Eastern Counties Railway (ECR). Although they wished to amalgamate formally, they could not obtain government agreement for this until 1862, when the Great Eastern Railway (GER) was formed.

As London grew, developers starting acquiring land to build new properties. The GER realised that the two track main line was not enough to cope with the new suburban and longer distance traffic, and still provide a reliable service for the minor stations. The answer was a programme of quadrupling (providing two additional tracks) along the route and this work took place in phases. Seven Kings station was opened by the Great Eastern Railway on 1 March 1899 and was provided with four platforms with the local services calling at the two northernmost platforms and the other two being used when they were not available. For a short period, the station was the end of the new four track section with two tracks north to Romford. The four tracking was extended to a junction south of Romford in 1901.

Seven Kings West signal box was located west of the station between the two sets of running lines and later, in 1903, controlled the line to the Fairlop Loop (see below). There was another signal box called Seven Kings East located on the up side east of the station.

In 1903, the GER opened a new line to the Hainault Loop and a three way, triangular junction was opened south of the station. The southern part of the triangle diverged at Ilford Carriage Sidings Junction and was used by regular passenger services. The northern leg of the junction was used by excursion traffic (to Epping Forest) and goods trains. The triangle was also used to turn locomotives from Ilford engine shed, which was located just south of Ilford Carriage Sidings Junction.

Table 298 of the Bradshaw's timetable guide of July 1922 shows Seven Kings to have a regular services of trains from Liverpool Street or Fenchurch Street. These trains terminated at Chadwell Heath, Romford or Gidea Park.

In 1923, the GER amalgamated with other railways to form the London and North Eastern Railway (LNER).

=== London and North Eastern Railway (1923–1947) ===
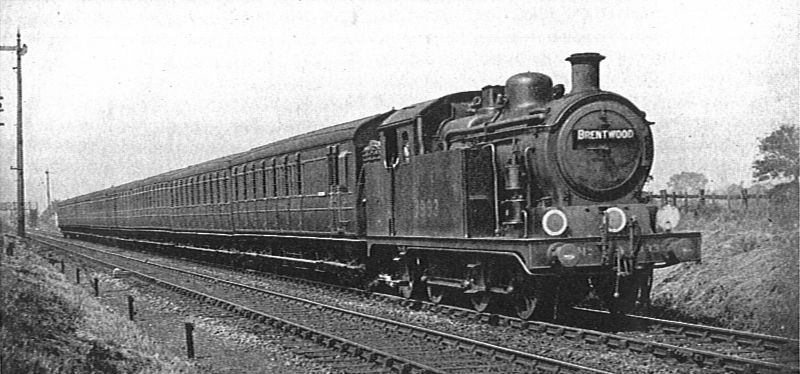
A typical LNER Suburban train, GER section of the LNER (CJ Allen, Steel Highway, 1928)

During this period, local stopping trains were generally hauled by LNER Class N7 locomotives on trains of corridor type carriage stock.

Plans were drawn up in the 1930s to electrify the suburban lines from Liverpool Street to Shenfield at 1,500 V DC and work was started on implementing this. However, the outbreak of World War II brought most of the project to a temporary halt and it was not until 1949 that the scheme was completed.

Seven Kings East Signal Box closed on 19 December 1943. The signal box at Seven Kings West was closed as part of the re-signalling (to colour light signalling) and electrification scheme on 7 August 1949. Responsibility for signalling trains through the area was taken over by a new signal box called Ilford Car Sheds.

The south part of the triangular junction was closed to passengers on 30 November 1947. The site was used for the new Ilford Depot which was to house the new Class 306 EMUs.

=== British Railways (1948–1994) ===
On 1 January 1948, following nationalisation of the railways, Seven Kings became part of the British Railways Eastern Region. The electrification scheme and its associated works were finished and, from February 1949, the Class 306 EMUs operated the service to steam timings with an accelerated all-electric schedule being introduced in September 1949.

The 1500 DC electrification system was converted to 25/6.35 KV AC operation between 4 and 6 November 1960.

The northern leg of the triangular junction was closed on 17 March 1956 and the site was then used for a further extension of Ilford depot.

In 1980, the first Class 315 EMUs were introduced to replace the Class 306s and were used on passenger trains serving Maryland.

A number of the platform buildings were demolished in the early 1980s.

The railway was sectorised in 1982; Seven Kings and the trains calling at it became part of the London and South-East sector. On 10 June 1986, this was rebranded to become Network South East which was responsible for working services up to privatisation.

=== Privatisation era (1994–present day) ===
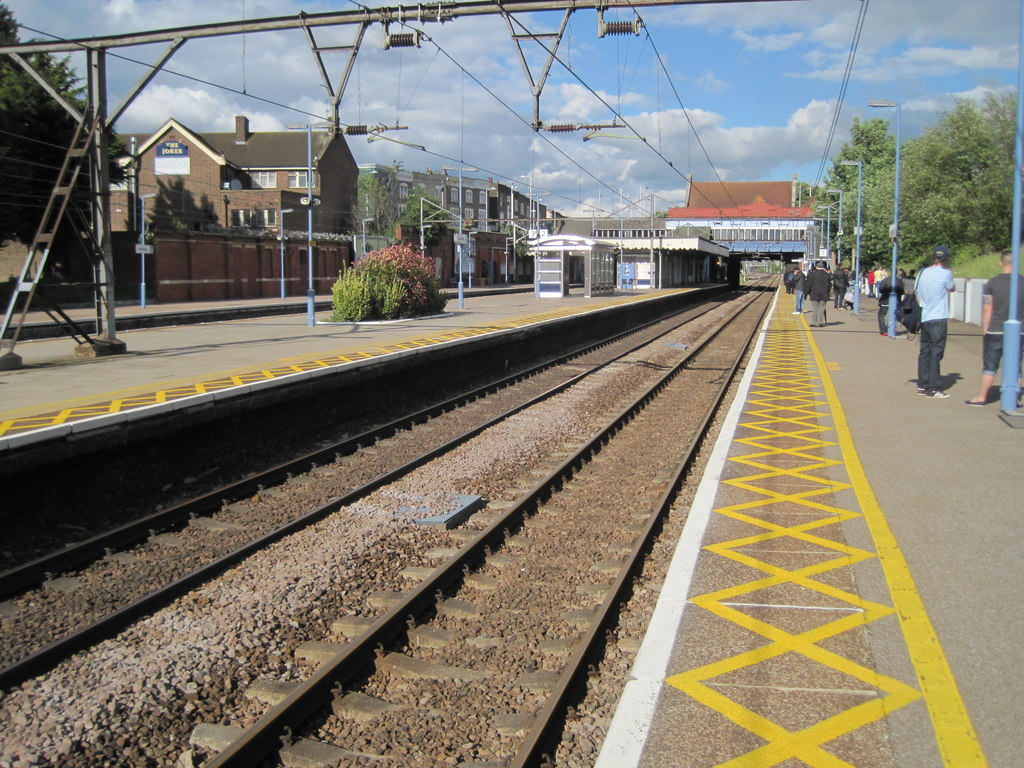
Seven Kings railway station – view of platforms, Greater London, 2012 – geograph.org.uk – 3426031

In April 1994, Railtrack became responsible for the maintenance of the infrastructure; it was succeeded by Network Rail in 2002.

Between privatisation on 1 April 1994 and 4 January 1997, the station was operated by a non-privatised business unit. Since then, passenger services calling at the station have been operated by the following franchises:

- First Great Eastern 5 January 1997 – 31 March 2004
- National Express East Anglia 1 April 2004 – 4 February 2012
- Abellio Greater Anglia 5 February 2012 – 30 May 2015
- MTR TFL Rail 31 May 2015 – 23 May 2022, after which the line was rebranded as the Elizabeth line who are the current operator.

In June 2017, new Class 345 trains began entering service in preparation for completion of the Crossrail project. New lifts, signage, help points, customer information screens and CCTV were installed. The platforms at Seven Kings are too short for the 200 metres (220 yd) long nine-carriage trains, so selective door opening is utilised to prevent the doors opening in one carriage.

In February 2019, step-free access was introduced to Seven Kings station.

The Class 315 trains were finally taken out of service in 2022. Through services to central London, Heathrow Airport and Reading started running on the Elizabeth line on 22 November 2022.

=== Accidents and incidents ===
On 23 January 1963, eight people were injured in a collision between two trains on the main line just outside of Seven Kings station. An express train from Harwich Parkeston Quay to London passed a signal at danger and ran into the rear of a Southend-London stopping service at "fairly low speed". The express train was subsequently found to have a fault with one of its brakes. A Ministry of Transport report on the incident stated that the express train's driver "cannot be excused entirely from responsibility" given his passing of the red signal. The line was reopened four hours after the incident.

== Location ==
Seven Kings is the closest station to Ilford EMU Depot.

London Buses routes 86 and N86 serve the station.

== Services ==
Most services at Seven Kings are operated by the Elizabeth line using Class 345 EMUs, with a very limited service operated by Greater Anglia using Class 720 EMUs.

The typical Monday to Friday off-peak service in trains per hour is:

- 8 tph to London Paddington of which 2 continue to Heathrow Terminal 5
- 8 tph to Shenfield

During the peak hours, the station is served by a number of additional services between London Liverpool Street and Gidea Park. These services do not call at Whitechapel. The station is also served by a single early morning Greater Anglia service from Colchester to London Liverpool Street.

On Sundays, the service to and from Shenfield is reduced to 4 tph, with alternating services running only as far as Gidea Park.

To facilitate staff access to Ilford depot, there is an early-morning service operated by Greater Anglia from Colchester to Liverpool Street that calls at Seven Kings.

Preceding station	Elizabeth line	Following station
Ilford towards Heathrow Terminal 5	Elizabeth line	Goodmayes towards Shenfield
