= Ilford railway station =

National Rail station in London, England

Ilford
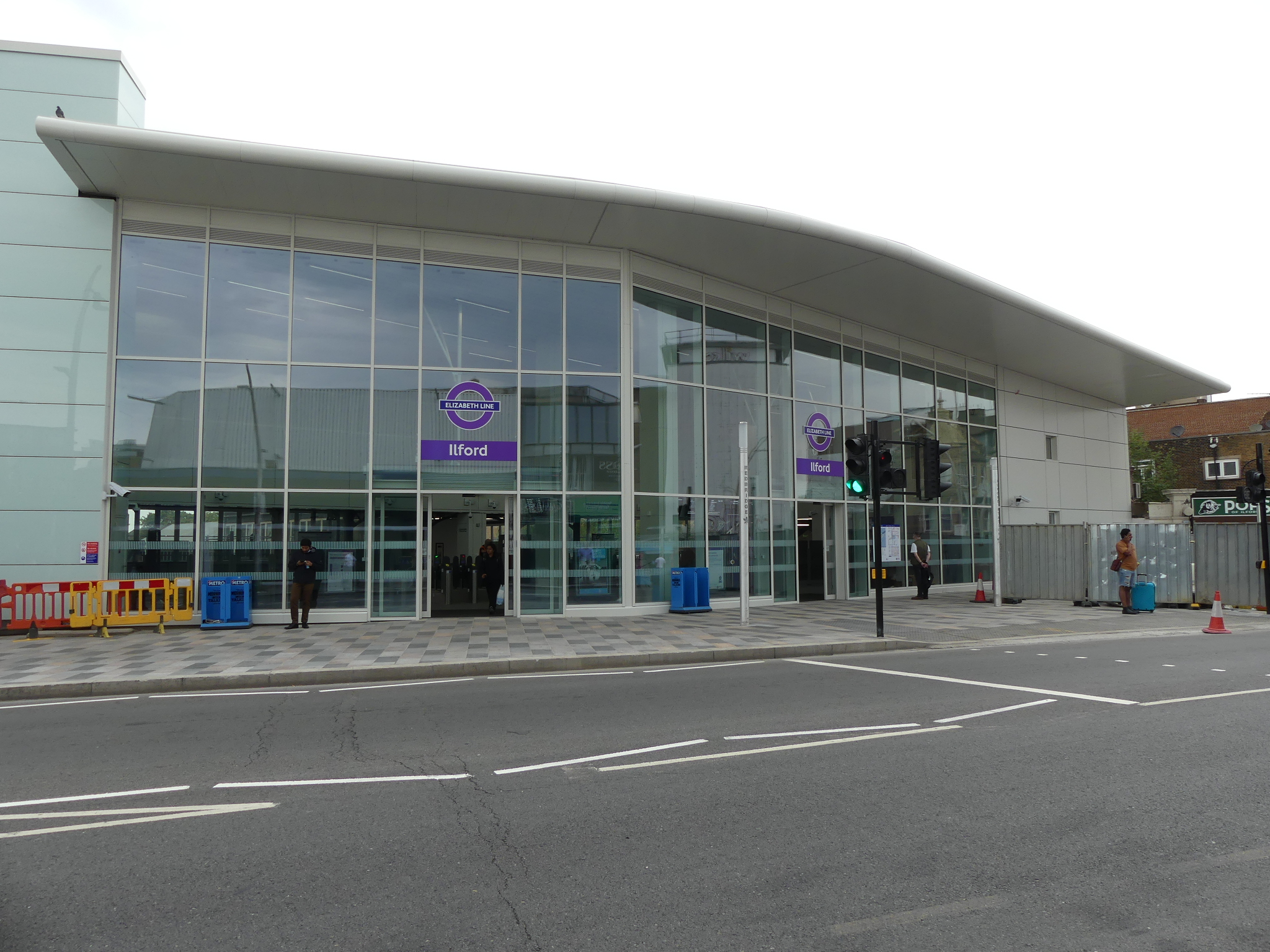
- Station entrance seen in September 2022
- Interactive map of Ilford

General information
- Location: Ilford
- Local authority: London Borough of Redbridge
- Managed by: Elizabeth line
- Owner: Network Rail
- Station code: IFD
- Number of platforms: 4 operational; 1 disused
- Fare zone: 4

National Rail annual entry and exit
- 2020–21: ▼2.536 million
- Interchange: ▼10,481
- 2021–22: ▲4.755 million
- Interchange: ▲19,204
- 2022–23: ▲8.751 million
- Interchange: ▼80
- 2023–24: ▲13.163 million
- Interchange: ▼33
- 2024–25: ▼10.927 million
- Interchange: ▲47

Key dates
- 20 June 1839: Opened

Other information
- External links: Departures; Facilities
- Coordinates: 51.5592°N 0.0700°E

Ilford railway station is on the Great Eastern Main Line serving the town of Ilford in the London Borough of Redbridge, east London. It is 7 miles 29 chains (11.8 km) down the line from London Liverpool Street and is situated between Manor Park and Seven Kings. Its three-letter station code is IFD and it is in London fare zone 4.

The station was opened in 1839 by the Eastern Counties Railway. It is currently managed and served by the Elizabeth line.

== History ==
=== Eastern Counties Railway (1839–1862) ===
Ilford railway station was opened on 20 June 1839 by the Eastern Counties Railway, when the opened their line between a temporary terminus at Mile End and Romford. The line was extended to the London terminus of Bishopsgate in 1840 and in stages into Essex where it linked with the Eastern Union Railway at Colchester. This became the main route from London to Norwich and today is known as the Great Eastern Main Line.

The 1839 station had two platforms and a shed like structure on the up side which was believed to be for stabling carriages. The station building was located on Ilford Hill while Cranbrook Road crossed over the line at the eastern end of the station. In 1845 a small goods shed was located at the eastern end on the up side and this was later supplemented by coal drops and a traverser which served a paper mill at the western end of the up line. By the 1850s a small siding existed on the down side although it is not certain what traffic was handled here.

The Bradshaws Railway guide of 1 March 1850 showed Ilford trains on table 33 with eight trains on a weekday (noting that Saturday was then considered a weekday). Compared to today there were few stations on the route and all the down trains from called at Ilford. Of the eight, three services terminated at Bury St Edmunds and two at Ipswich. These trains were operated by the Eastern Union Railway north of Colchester. Two of the remaining services terminated at Brentwood with the other terminating at Chelmsford.

The up direction timetable also had eight weekday trains and five trains in each direction operated on Sunday.

Passengers from the city changed at Stratford for services to Fenchurch Street.

By the 1860s the railways in East Anglia were in financial trouble, and most were leased to the ECR; they wished to amalgamate formally, but could not obtain government agreement for this until 1862, when the Great Eastern Railway was formed by amalgamation. Thus Ilford became a GER station in 1862.

=== Great Eastern Railway (1862–1922) ===
In 1882, a new goods facility was built on the upside about half a mile east of Ilford station although the earlier sidings in the Ilford area continued operating for some years.

In 1886, the carriage stabling shed was demolished and the up platform widened. Ilford station was completely rebuilt between 1891 and 1893 in advance of the 1894 quadrupling. The new station entrance was in Cranbrook Road and initially only the local lines had platforms. A new bay platform and run round loop were built on the down side.

The period of 1893–1910 was one of great housing growth in the area and in 1895 the York Road entrance was opened at the west end of the station. On 1 July 1898 platforms on the two through lines were bought into service. The original 1839 entrance was re-opened for sundries traffic (as it had level access) at this time to serve the up through platform.

From 1903, trains from Fenchurch Street ran through Ilford to Woodford following the opening of the Fairlop Loop. 200,000 milk churns were being handled by the station in the mid-1900s, so a bridge equipped with lifts to platform level was built. Later a dairy siding was located at the 1882 up goods yard on the upside and that received milk traffic from Halesworth and North Elmham in East Anglia meaning the bridge was then used for parcels. The milk traffic ceased in the 1960s.

The July 1922 Bradshaw's Guide showed over 120 trains from Liverpool Street and Fenchurch Street calling at Ilford the majority of which were suburban trains, although some longer distance services still called. The majority of the suburban trains were to destinations on the Great Eastern Main Line, some terminating at Ilford and some routed towards the Fairlop Loop.

In 1923, the GER amalgamated with other railways to form the London and North Eastern Railway (LNER).

=== London and North Eastern Railway (1923–1947) ===
Plans were drawn up in the 1930s to electrify the suburban lines from Liverpool Street to Shenfield at 1,500 V DC and work was started on implementing this. However, the outbreak of the Second World War brought the project to a temporary halt and it was not until 1949 that the scheme was completed.

A flyover south of Ilford opened on 6 October 1947 and this enabled local trains to cross over the through lines without a conflicting movement and was a major part of the electrification project.

New signalling using searchlight type colour signals was introduced in 1949 with a single new signal box south of the station replacing the mechanical boxes at Aldersbrook (closed 14 August 1949), Ilford West Junction (closed 14 August 1949) and Ilford East (closed 15 October 1947) all which dated from 1893/4. North of the station a new box opened to control the entrance to Ilford EMU depot and Ilford Carriage Sidings Junction box was closed on 7 August 1949. The junction at Ilford East was also removed at this time and the running lines were renamed Main (formerly Through) and Electric lines (formerly Local).

The extension of the Central Line in 1947 saw a number of changes that affected Ilford station with the route from Ilford to the Fairlop Loop being closed on 30 November 1947. The other connection to Seven Kings West Junction was goods only and survived until 19 March 1956. This leg of the triangular junction disappeared under expansion of Ilford Depot in 1959.

=== British Railways (1948–1994) ===
On 1 January 1948, following nationalisation of the railways, Ilford became part of the British Railways Eastern Region.

From February 1949 the Class 306 EMUs operated the service to steam timings but an accelerated all electric schedule was introduced in September 1949.

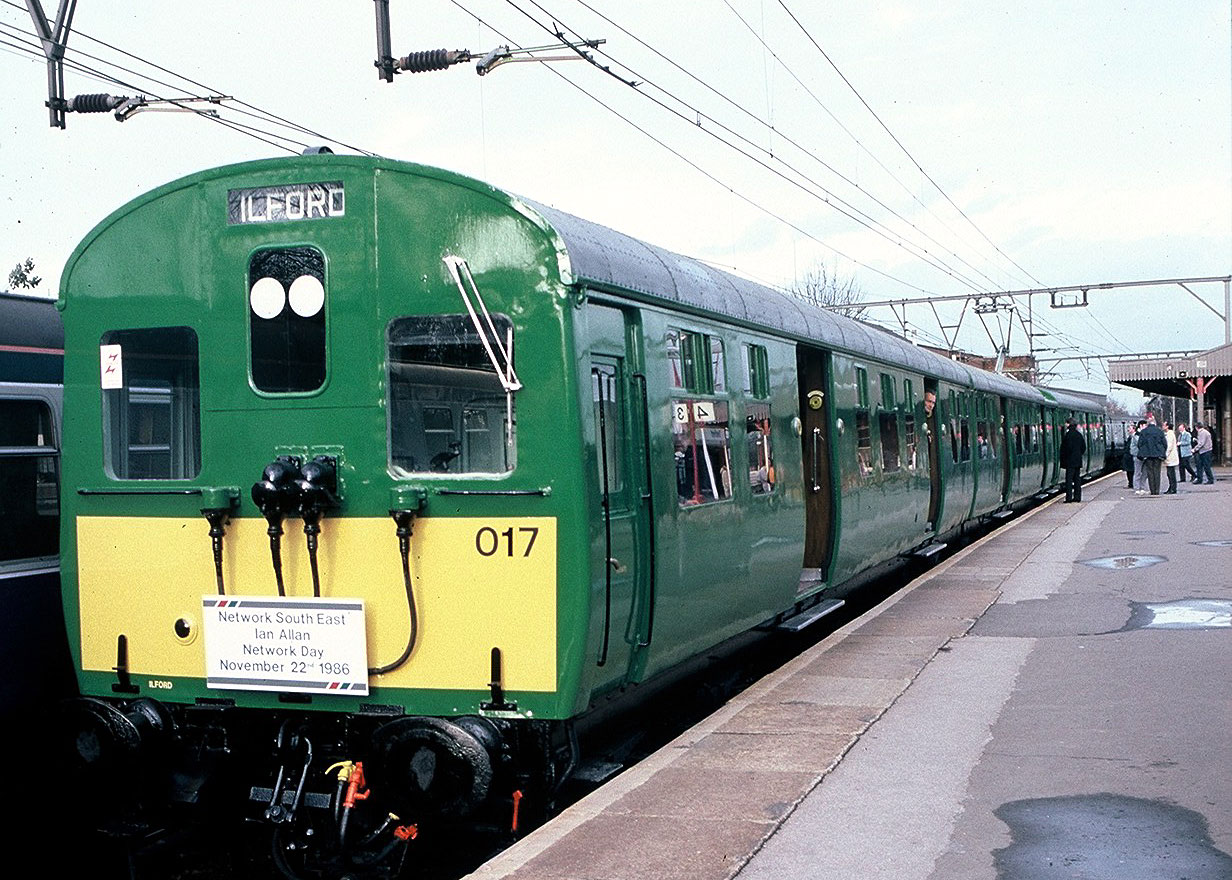
Class 306 Green

The 1500 DC electrification system was converted to 25/6.35 KV AC operation between 4 and 6 November 1960.

In 1980 the first Class 315 EMUs were introduced to replace the Class 306s. The 315s were in service until 2022 and were used on passenger trains serving Ilford.

Platform 5 had seen little use in the 2000s and was closed and lifted c 2016.

The stopping services usually call at platforms 3 and 4 whilst platforms 1 and 2 are used by longer distance non-stop services to/from Colchester, Clacton, Ipswich and Norwich. When platforms 3 and 4 are closed to rail traffic then the service will use the other platforms.

The railway was sectorised in 1982 and Ilford and the trains calling at it became part of the London and South-East sector. On 10 June 1986 this was rebranded to become Network South East which was responsible for working services up to privatisation.

=== Franchises (1994–2022) ===
In April 1994 Railtrack became responsible for the maintenance of the infrastructure. Railtrack was succeeded by Network Rail in 2002.

Between privatisation on 1 April 1994 and 4 January 1997 the station was operated by a non-privatised business unit. Since then passenger services calling at the station have been operated by the following franchises:

- First Great Eastern between 5 January 1997 and 31 May 2004
- National Express East Anglia between 1 April 2004 and 4 February 2012
- Greater Anglia between 5 February 2012 and 30 May 2015
- TfL Rail between 31 May 2015 and 23 May 2022

The 1949 signal box was closed on 26 August 1996 with signalling being taken over by Liverpool Street IECC.

=== Elizabeth line ===
On 26 May 2021, new Class 345 trains began entering service in preparation for the opening of the Elizabeth line.

TfL Rail was rebranded as the Elizabeth line on 24 May 2022. Initially Elizabeth line services from Ilford operated into Liverpool Street only. On 22 November 2022, services were able to operate through central London and onto Reading.

=== Accidents and incidents ===
On New Year's Day of 1915 the station was the scene of a major collision in which 10 people were killed.

Lieutenant-Colonel Frank Heilgers, a Member of Parliament, was one of nine people killed in the 1944 Ilford rail crash.

On 4 December 2024, Jorge Ortega, a customer experience assistant for the Elizabeth line, was killed on duty.

== Layout ==
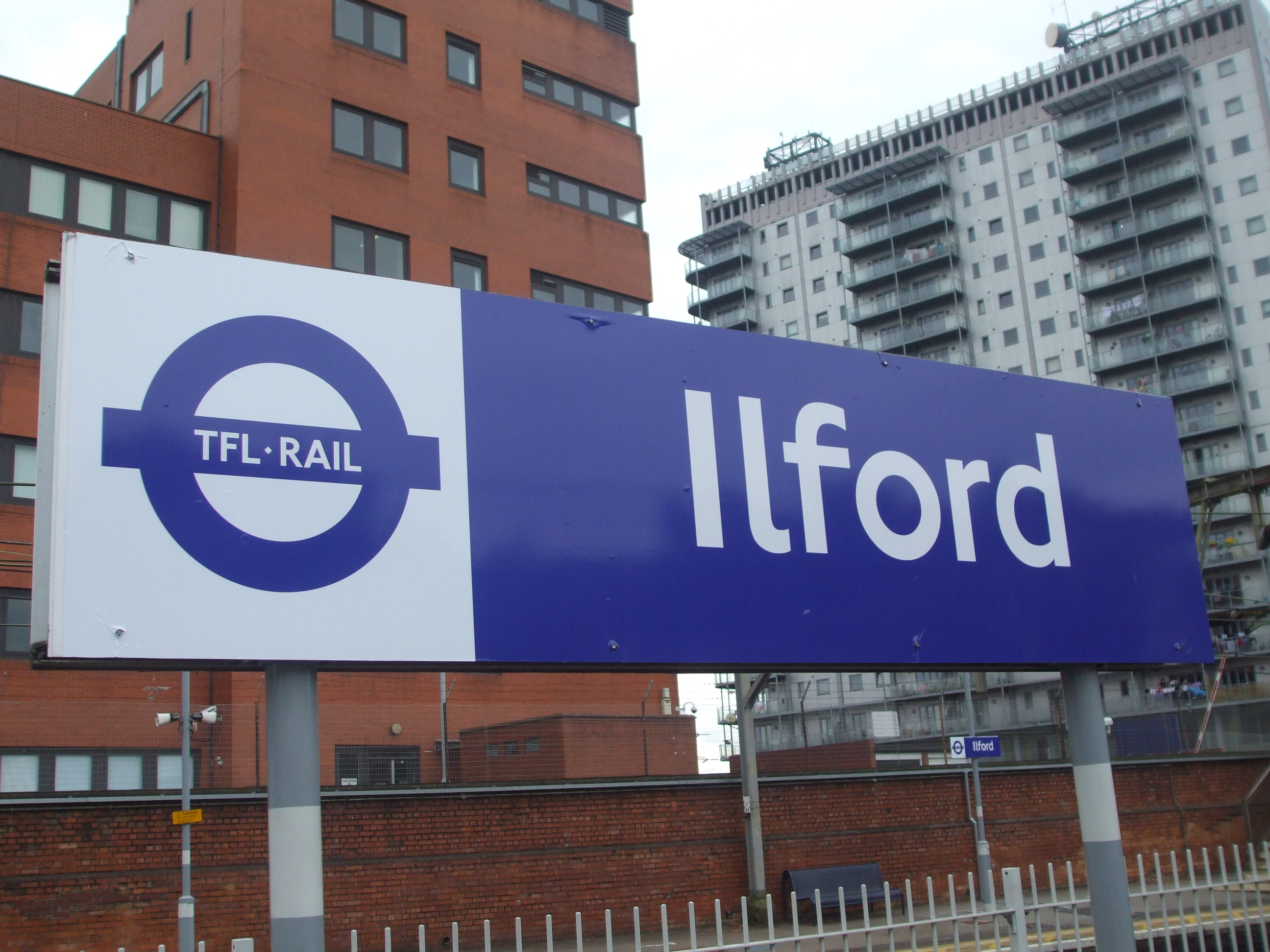
Old Ilford platform signage

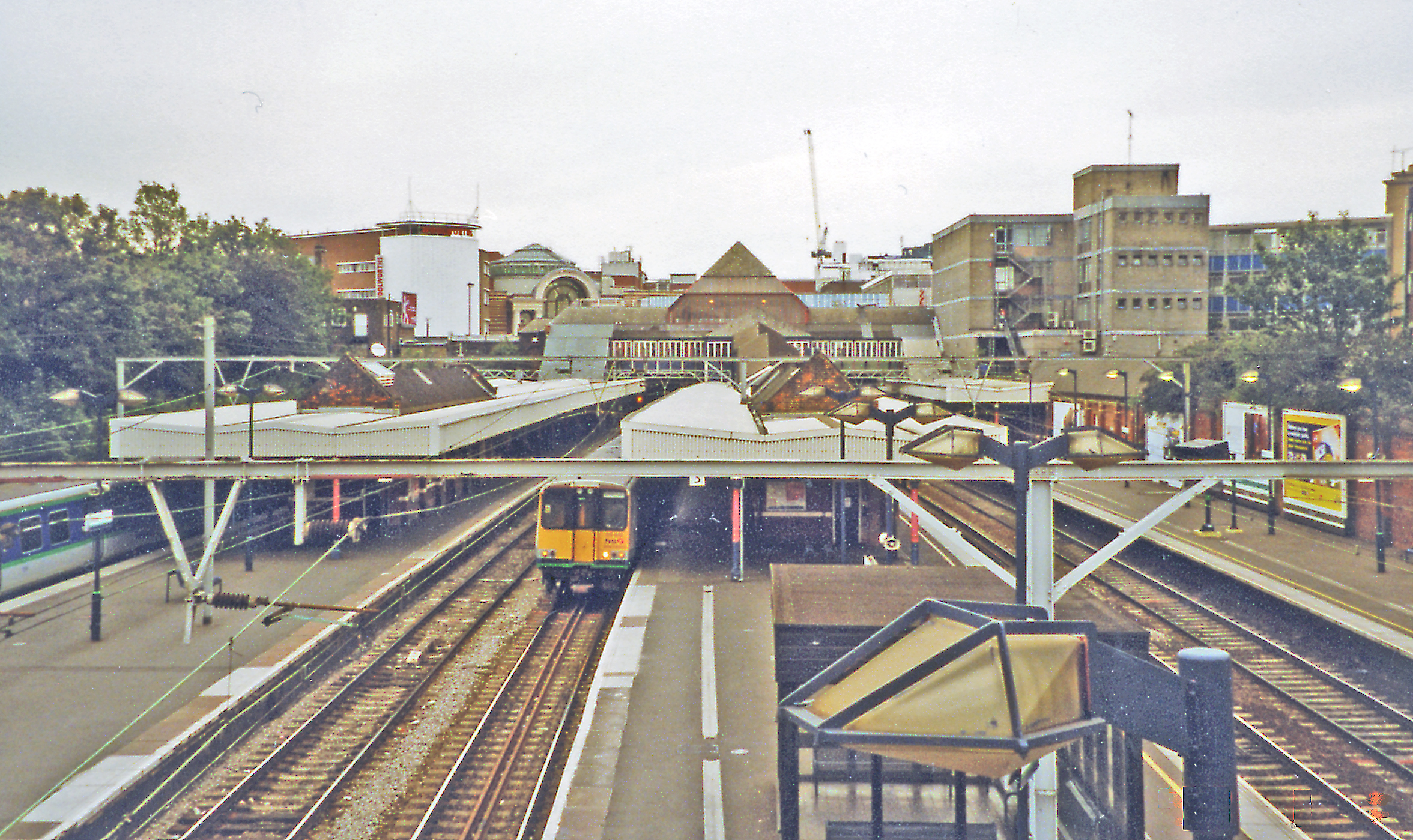
Ilford railway station in 2002

The main entrance, in Cranbrook Road, was heavily rebuilt during the 1980s, with architecture in keeping with other contemporary buildings in Ilford such as the Central Library. This stretch of Cranbrook Road was originally called Station Road but this name was transferred to a short portion of Havelock Street immediately opposite the station. There is also a secondary entrance on York Road, from which the western (London) ends of the platforms can be reached via a footbridge. This entrance was refurbished in 2016.

The station has four operational platforms: two "up" (headed west toward London) and two "down" (towards Shenfield). A bay platform numbered platform 5 remains in situ but is disused as the track alongside it was removed in 2016. Regular stopping services typically use platforms 3 and 4 on the electric line between London and Shenfield, while platforms 1 and 2 are used only during engineering work and line disruptions as the two adjacent tracks are used by through-trains on the main line. Immediately to the west of the station is a flyover that allows the main line to cross over from the south side of the electric line to the north, and thus easily access the longer northern platforms at Liverpool Street without having the cross over in the station throat. The tracks cross the River Roding at the same point, and pass under the North Circular Road.

The platforms at Ilford are several metres below street-level, as the road rises up to pass over the railway line. The north side of the station is edged by an embankment lined with housing. The south side is lined with large buildings (the Former Valentine House office building and the former British Gas building now converted to residential use, the new Paragon complex and a large British Telecom building, whose rooftop logo can be seen from passing trains) and platform level approximates to street-level by the far end of the station. Despite the steps to the platforms, step free access via lifts is now available since the reopening of the main station entrance in 2022. There were two access stairways from the concourse to platforms 2 and 3. This served a purpose of segregating arriving and departing passengers. The down staircase went immediately from the concourse to the station platform whilst the up staircase rises from approximately 100 m along the platform and is connected by an elevated walkway to the concourse. However, the new lift to platforms 2 and 3 was built in the place of the down staircase.

The 1980s station building closed on 25 January 2020 and its demolition began the following day. Its replacement opened to the public on 1 September 2022. A third, southern entrance, next to Ilford Hill (top picture) opened on 23 May 2021.

== Services ==
All services at Ilford are operated by the Elizabeth line using Class 345 EMUs.

The typical Monday to Friday off-peak service in trains per hour is:

- 8 tph to London Paddington of which 2 continue to Heathrow Terminal 5
- 8 tph to Shenfield

During the peak hours, the station is served by a number of additional services between London Liverpool Street and Gidea Park. These services do not call at Whitechapel.

On Sundays, the service to and from Shenfield is reduced to 4 tph, with alternating services running only as far as Gidea Park.

Preceding station	Elizabeth line	Following station
Manor Park towards Heathrow Terminal 5	Elizabeth line	Seven Kings towards Shenfield
	Disused railways	
Manor Park Line and station open	Great Eastern Railway Woodford and Ilford Line	Newbury Park Line closed, station open

== Connections ==
London Buses routes 123, 128, 145, 150, 167, 179, 296, 364, 366, 396, 462, SL2 and school routes 667, 677 and 679 serve the station from Cranbrook Road, while routes 25, 86, 147, 169, 425, EL1, W19 and night routes N25 and N86 serve the station from Ilford Hill/Chapel Road.
