= Ilford rail crash =

There have been two Ilford rail crashes:

- Ilford rail crash (1915)
- Ilford rail crash (1944)
