= Crowlands =

Crowlands could refer to:

- Crowlands, Victoria, Australia
  - Crowlands railway station, Victoria
- An area of Romford, United Kingdom
  - Crowlands railway station
  - Rush Green and Crowlands (ward)
