= Crowlands railway station =

Proposed railway station in Romford, UK

Crowlands
- Interactive map of Crowlands

General information
- Location: Romford
- Local authority: London Borough of Havering
- Number of platforms: 4 (unfinished)

Railway companies
- Original company: Great Eastern Railway

Key dates
- 1900: First proposed, but never opened

Other information
- Coordinates: 51.570695°N 0.16046°E

Crowlands railway station was a proposed station on the Great Eastern Main Line near Romford, London, to be sited between Chadwell Heath and Romford, just west of Jutsums Lane where the railway passes over the road on a narrow bridge.

It was first proposed in 1900 by the Great Eastern Railway and platform foundations were laid, but construction was never completed. The London and North Eastern Railway, which inherited the route after the 1923 grouping of railway companies, resurrected the plans for Crowlands station in 1935 as part of their electrification plans, but nothing came about and the plans were ultimately shelved after the Second World War. Thus, today there is a relatively significant distance of 2 miles 31 chains (3.8 km) on the line between Chadwell Heath and Romford stations.

The platform foundations at Crowlands are still in existence in the undergrowth, although they are not visible from street level as the railway is on an embankment. Railway infrastructure in the area that was completed included a signal box just west of the station site, which closed in 1949 as part of the Shenfield electrification project, as well an overhead electrification depot, to the east of Jutsums Lane.

	Abandoned works	
Preceding station	Great Eastern Railway	Following station
Chadwell Heath; Line and station open	Great Eastern Main Line	Romford; Line and station open
