= 1915 Ilford rail crash =

1915 rail disaster in Essex, England

Ilford rail crash
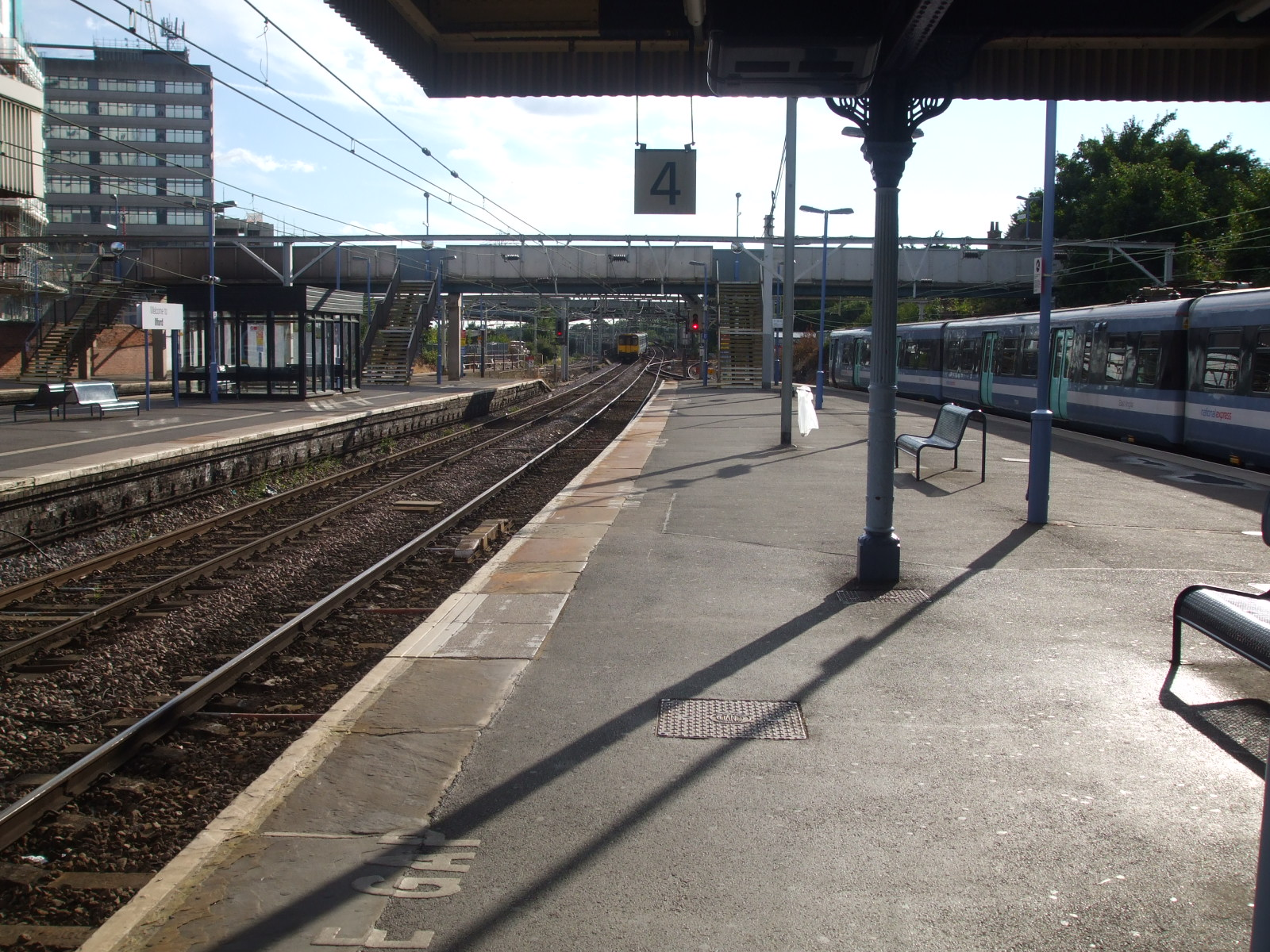
- The west end of Ilford station where the crash occurred, pictured in 2009

- Location of Ilford Station in Greater London

Details
- Date: 1 January 1915; 08:40
- Location: Ilford
- Coordinates: 51°33′32″N 0°04′07″E
- Country: England
- Line: Great Eastern Main Line
- Operator: Great Eastern Railway
- Incident type: Collision
- Cause: Signal passed at danger

Statistics
- Trains: 2
- Deaths: 10
- Injured: 500

The 1915 Ilford rail crash occurred on 1 January 1915 when an express passenger train passed a signal at danger and collided with another passenger train that was stopped at Ilford railway station on the Great Eastern Main Line in Essex, England. Ten people died and approximately 500 complained of injury.

== Collision ==
At approximately 08:40 on 1 January 1915 the crew of the 07:06 express service from Clacton to London Liverpool Street failed to see that the distant and home signals at the Ilford east signal box were at danger. The signalman tried to attract their attention by shouting and waving a red flag from the signal box, but to no avail. At the west end of the station, the 08:20 local service from Gidea Park to Liverpool Street was crossing over from the local line to the through line when it was run into by the Clacton express travelling on the through line at a speed variously estimated at 20 to 50 mph (32 to 80 km/h). The impact completely destroyed the eighth coach and severely damaged five others of the Gidea Park train, as well as the engine and first two vehicles of the Clacton train. Ten passengers died and over 500 complained of injury.

The official report attributed blame to the driver of the Clacton train for his "insufficient care in noting the positions of his signals when approaching Ilford". It also noted that the accident would have been much less likely if some form of Automatic Warning System had been in use, and recommended its introduction.

== See also ==
- Ilford rail crash (1944)
