= Ilford Depot =

Railway maintenance depot in Greater London, England

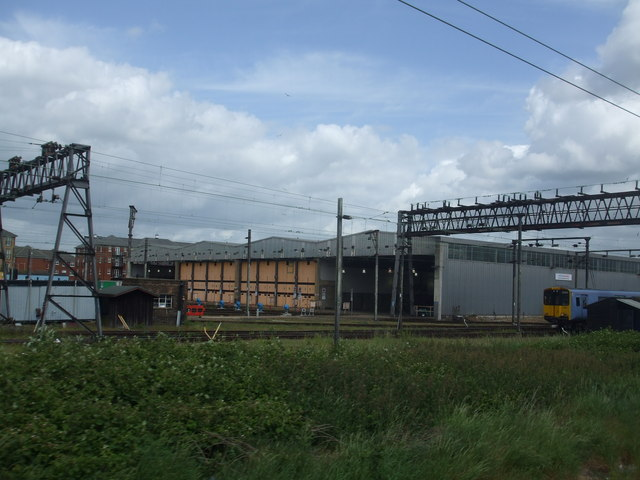
- Ilford TMD, seen in 2009
- Interactive map of Ilford Depot

Location
- Location: Ilford, Greater London,
- Coordinates: 51.5638°N 0.0887°E
- OS grid: TQ449871

Characteristics
- Owner: Greater Anglia, Alstom
- Depot code: IL (1973–)
- Type: Electric multiple units

Ilford Depot is a traction maintenance depot located in Ilford, Greater London, England. The site is used for train stabling and maintenance by Greater Anglia, Elizabeth line, London Overground and Alstom.

== Location ==
The depot is situated on the Great Eastern Main Line and is on the north side of the line, to the east of Ilford station and on the way towards Seven Kings.

== History ==
Facilities for an engine pit at Ilford goods yard were first provided in 1889 by the Great Eastern Railway. With burgeoning commuter rail traffic, a three road engine shed was provided next to Ley Street which opened in 1901. A fire in May 1909 saw a number of locomotives damaged, but repairs were authorised quickly and the structure repaired.

In 1903, a triangular junction was built just to the north of this site linking the main line to the Fairlop Loop.

The engine shed became part of the LNER in 1923. In 1931, the allocation primarily consisted of N7 0-6-2T locomotives and the site was adjacent to carriage sidings and a coal depot.

Plans were drawn up in the 1930s to electrify the suburban lines from Liverpool Street to Shenfield at 1,500 V DC and, later in the decade, implementation commenced.

Additionally, plans were being made to extend the Central Line east from Liverpool Street and take over the Epping branch and Fairlop Loop.

Ilford was chosen as the location for the new depot and, as a result, the engine shed and carriage sidings were closed in May 1937. The site was cleared and the steel frame of the first shed was erected by June 1940, although it was not until 1949 that it had a roof.

As well as the site above, the new depot required the land occupied by the link from Ilford to the Fairlop Loop, which was subsequently closed on 29 November 1947. The link between Seven Kings and the Fairlop Loop was retained until 1956 for freight traffic before total closure, after which the depot was extended further east towards Seven Kings.

Until a remodel in 2016, as part of the Crossrail works, Ilford TMD had four sheds:

- The first two of which were opened in 1949 for DC electric multiple units (EMUs) and were converted to AC in 1960. One was a six-tracked shed, with four through-roads sheds and the other a three-road dead end shed;
- The third building is the largest, opened in 1960 for AC EMUs, being a sixteen-road dead-ended shed. This was built on the land occupied by the Seven Kings to Fairlop Loop curve;
- The fourth building is a one-track through-road shed which was opened around 2000.

In 2021, a carriage washing machine was installed; it began operation in September following an investment of £1.2 million.

=== Allocation ===
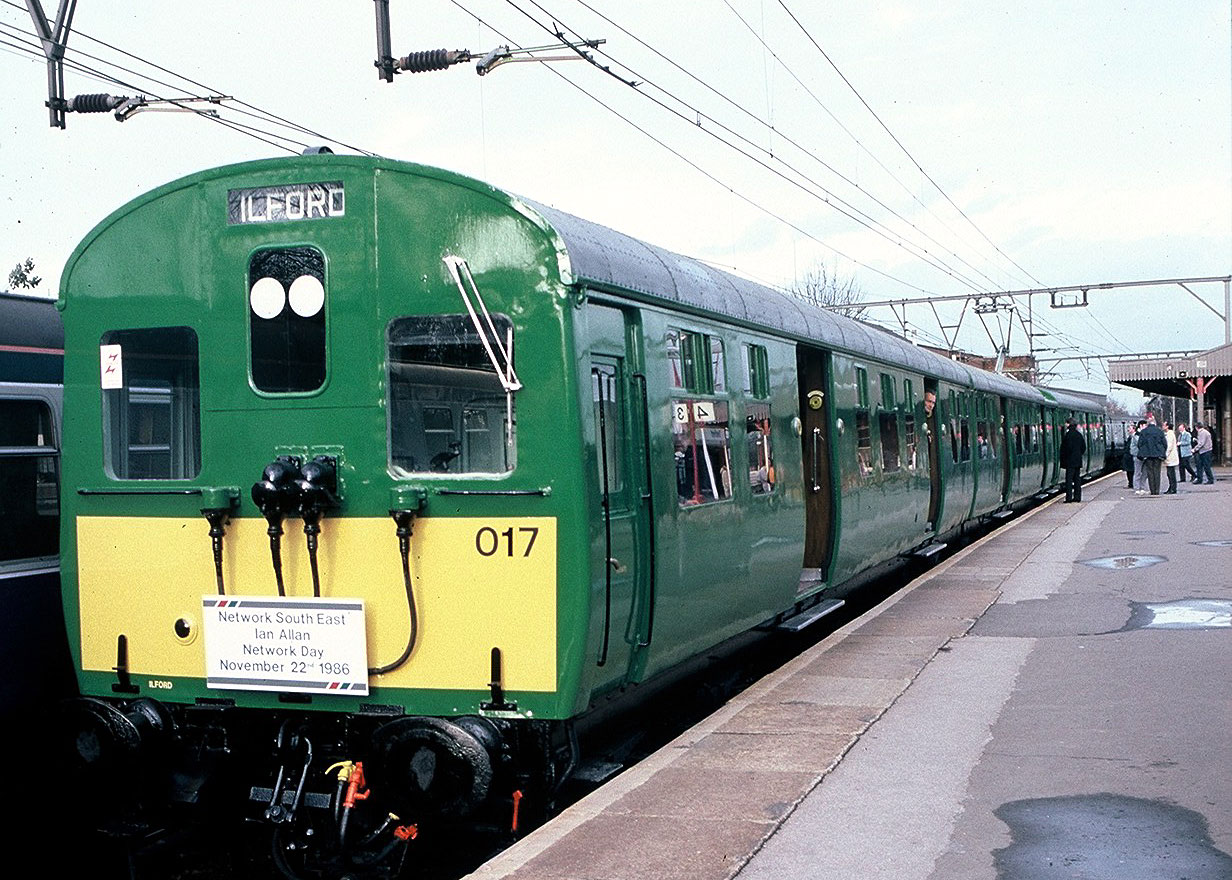
The preserved Class 306 in green livery at Shenfield, November 1986

The first EMUs allocated to the depot were 92 Class 306s, which were fitted with sliding doors; these operated services between Liverpool Street and Shenfield from February 1949.

The depot was allocated a 1914 North Eastern Railway EB1 class locomotive, no. 26510, as a shunter. This last ran on 4 November 1960, after which the shed was converted to AC operation.

Between 1952 and 1954, the depot hosted a number of Class 76 electric locomotives which were tested on local passenger and freight services.

During the 1960s, as electrification was extended to Southend Victoria, Colchester, Clacton-on-Sea and Walton-on-the-Naze, more EMUs were introduced and allocated to Ilford.

In the early 1980s, the Class 306s were replaced by Class 315 units.

Around 1987, the depot's allocation included Classes 302, 305, 307, 308 and 315 EMUs.

As these classes were withdrawn in the 1990s and 2000s, they were replaced by Classes 317, 321, 379 and 360.

In June 2017, new Class 345 units began entering service in preparation for the opening of the Elizabeth line, which led to the withdrawal of the Class 315 EMUs in 2022.

== Facilities ==
Within the site is a sixteen-road shed, operated by Greater Anglia, which was formerly used for the maintenance of Class 321 units. Class 379 units were maintained by Bombardier Transportation on one of the roads, with Class 360 units maintained by Siemens Mobility on another.

On introduction of Class 710 and Class 720 Alstom Aventras in 2019/20, all maintenance staff and facilities were transferred to Bombardier Transportation, which was acquired subsequently by Alstom in 2021.

A six-road overhaul and refurbishment shed is present, with three roads being electrified. In 2024, this building is used for light maintenance and exam work for the Class 345 Aventras and Bombardier Electrostars. There is a wheel lathe on site.

== Allocation in 2023 ==
The depot's main rolling stock allocation consisted of:

- Class 720, leased by Greater Anglia
- Class 710, leased by London Overground
- Class 345, leased by the Elizabeth line

In 2023, there were two Class 08s on site used for shunting purposes. 08 700 is owned by Harry Needle Railroad Company and 08 573 by RMS Locotec; both are contracted to Alstom.
