= British Rail Class 315 =

Class of 61 British 4-car electric multiple units

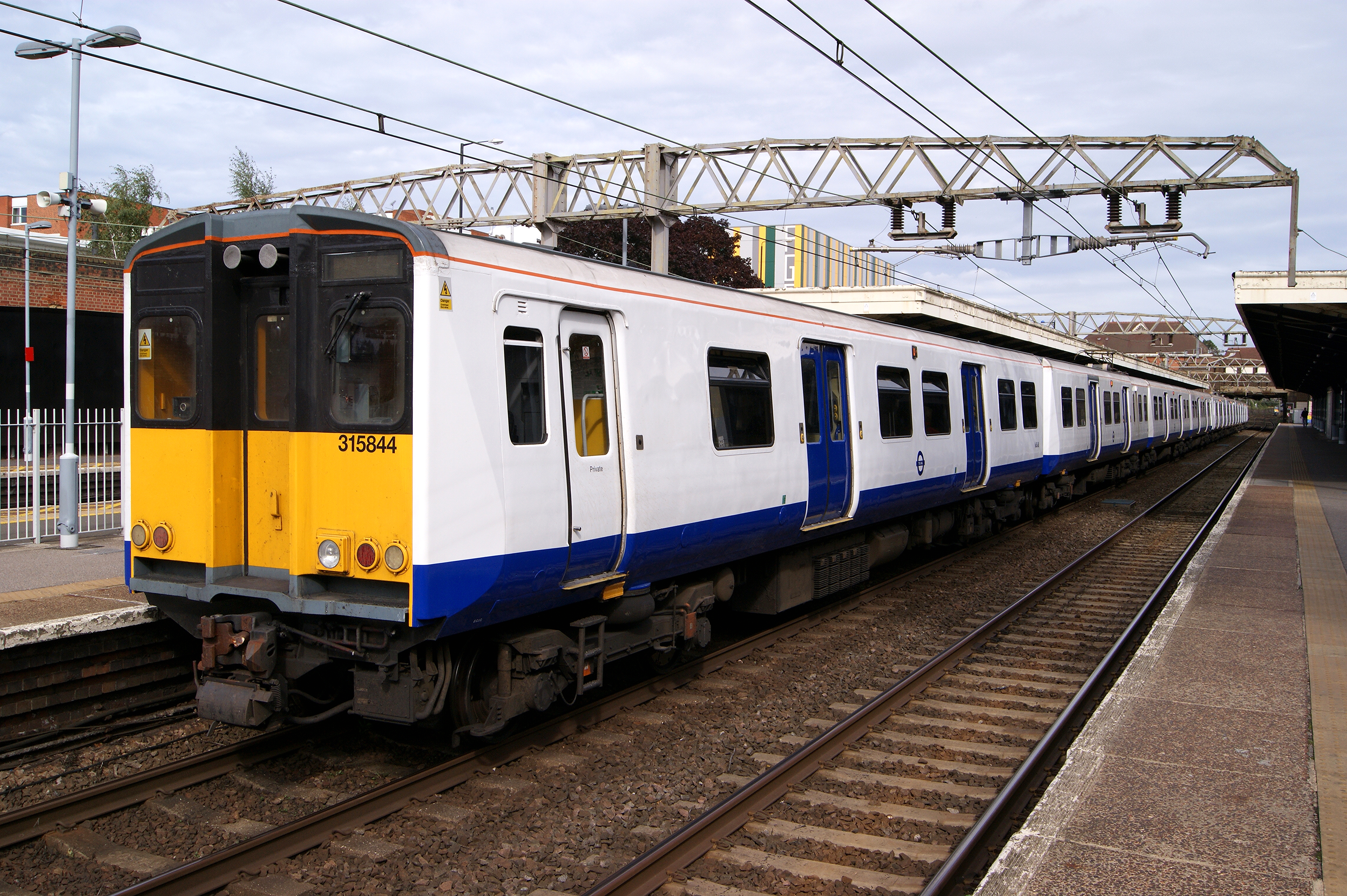
- TfL Rail Class 315 at Forest Gate in 2015

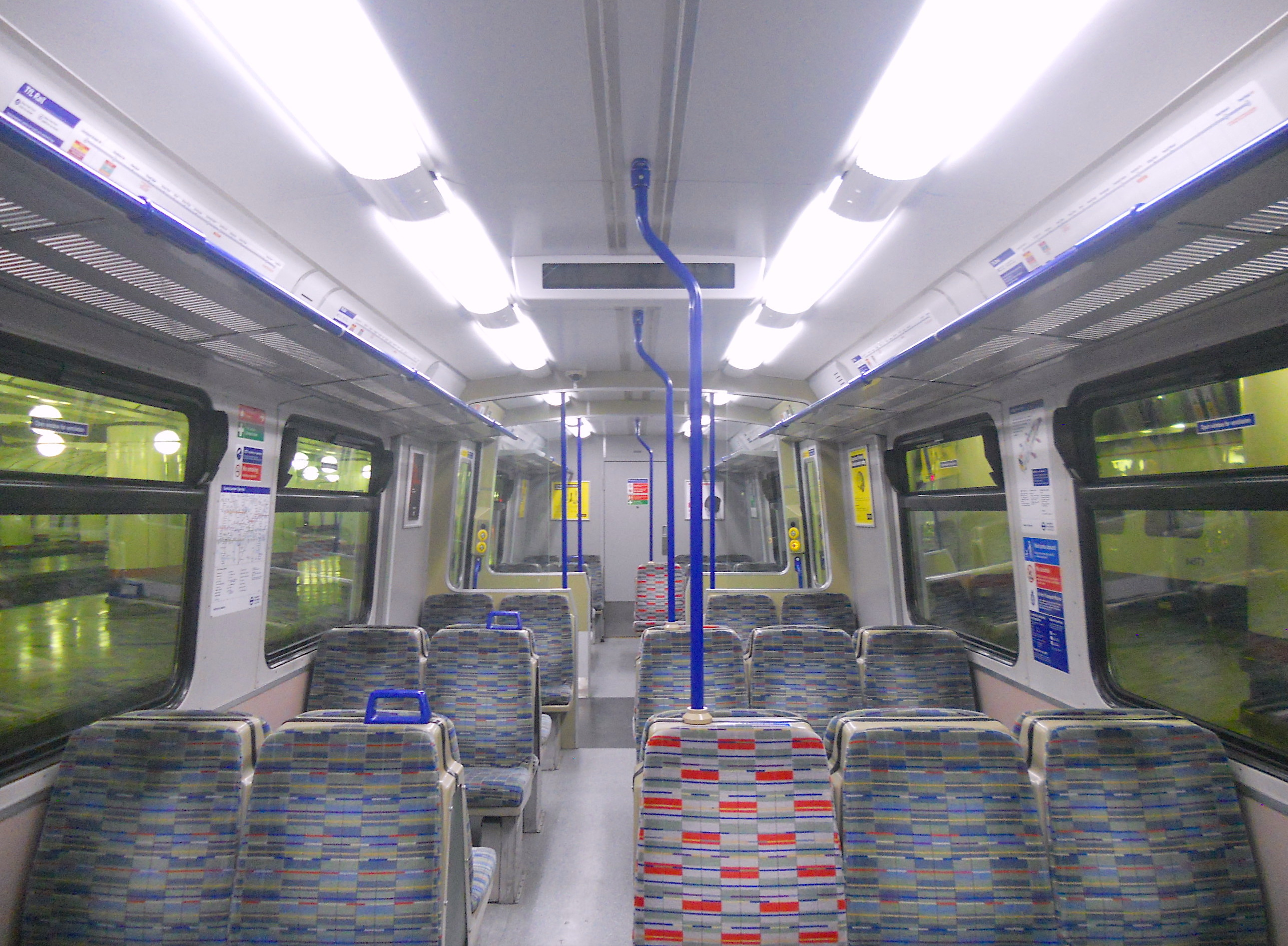
- The refreshed interior of a TfL Rail Class 315
- In service: 1980 – 9 December 2022
- Manufacturer: British Rail Engineering Limited
- Built at: Holgate Road Works, York
- Family name: BREL 1972
- Replaced: Class 105; Class 306
- Constructed: 1980–1981
- Refurbished: All units: 2004–2008 (at Bombardier Derby); LO & TfL Rail units: 2015–2016 (at Bombardier Ilford)
- Scrapped: 2022 - 2023
- Number built: 61
- Number preserved: 1
- Number scrapped: 60
- Successor: Class 345; Class 710
- Formation: 4 cars per unit: DMSO-PTSO-TSO-DMSO
- Diagram: DMSO vehicles: EA207; PTSO vehicles: EH217; TSO vehicles: EH216
- Fleet numbers: 315801–315861
- Capacity: As built: 318 seats; Post-2012: 309 seats, plus 7 tip-up
- Owner: Eversholt Rail Group
- Operators: British Rail; First Great Eastern; Greater Anglia; London Overground; MTR Elizabeth line; National Express East Anglia; Network SouthEast; TfL Rail; West Anglia Great Northern

Specifications
- Car body construction: Steel underframe with aluminium body and roof
- Car length: DM vehs.: 19.800 m (64 ft 11.5 in); Trailers: 19.920 m (65 ft 4.3 in)
- Width: 2.820 m (9 ft 3.0 in)
- Height: 3.582 m (11 ft 9.0 in)
- Floor height: 1.156 m (3 ft 9.5 in)
- Doors: Double-leaf pocket sliding, each 1.288 m (4 ft 2.7 in) wide (2 per side per car)
- Wheelbase: Over bogie centres: 14.170 m (46 ft 5.9 in)
- Maximum speed: 75 mph (121 km/h)
- Weight: DMSO vehs.: 35.0 t (34.4 long tons; 38.6 short tons); PTSO vehs.: 32.0 t (31.5 long tons; 35.3 short tons); TSO vehs.: 25.5 t (25.1 long tons; 28.1 short tons)
- Traction motors: 8 total; 4 per DMSO vehicle; (Brush TM61-53 or GEC G310AZ, interchangeably)
- Power output: 660 kW (880 hp)
- Acceleration: 0.75 m/s^{2} (2.5 ft/s^{2})
- HVAC: Ducted warm air
- Electric system: 25 kV 50 Hz AC overhead
- Current collection: Pantograph
- UIC classification: Bo′Bo′+2′2′+2′2′+Bo′Bo′
- Bogies: BREL BX1
- Minimum turning radius: 70.4 m (231 ft 0 in)
- Braking system: Electro-pneumatic (disc)
- Safety systems: AWS; TPWS
- Coupling system: Tightlock
- Multiple working: Within class
- Track gauge: 1,435 mm (4 ft 8 1/2 in) standard gauge

Notes/references
- Specifications as at November 1987 except where otherwise noted.

The British Rail Class 315 is a class of alternating current (AC) electric multiple unit (EMU) trains that were built by British Rail Engineering Limited at Holgate Road Carriage Works in York between 1980 and 1981 to replace the Class 306 units. It was a variant of unit derived from British Rail's 1971 prototype suburban EMU design which, as the BREL 1972 family, eventually encompassed 755 vehicles across Classes 313, 314, 315, 507 and 508. Revenue services with Class 315 units commenced in 1980 and continued until 9 December 2022.

== Description ==
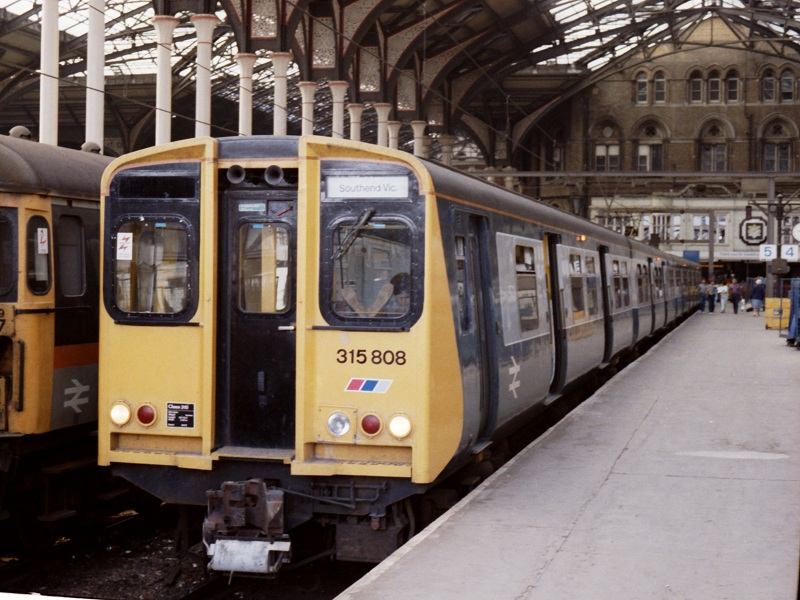
Class 315 in British Rail livery at Liverpool Street in 1987

Each Class 315 unit is formed of four vehicles; DMSO-PTSO-TSO-DMSO. Up to three units can be used together in service for a maximum 12-car formation.

Each DMSO vehicle carries four DC traction motors, each of 82 kW (110 hp) for a total power output of 660 kW (880 hp) per unit. The order included an element of dual-sourcing – 41 units (315801–315841) were fitted with electrical equipment from Brush Traction, while equipment for the remaining 20 units (315842–315861) was provided by the General Electric Company (GEC). The traction motors are interchangeable between equipment providers.

The DMSO vehicles also carry the air compressors and main reservoirs that provide the braking and suspension air supplies. The air supply was originally additionally used to operate the passenger doors, but this system was later replaced by an all-electric one.

The PTSO vehicles carry the main and auxiliary transformers, auxiliary batteries, the Stone Faiveley AMBR Mk.1 pantograph, and the main circuit breaker, while the TSO vehicles only provide passenger accommodation.

Seating is standard-class only and there are no toilet facilities provided onboard. As-built, each four-car unit had seats for 318 passengers, but this was reduced to 309 plus seven tip-up during a refit in 2012.

Vehicles are numbered in the following ranges:

- DMSO: 64461–64582
- PTSO: 71281–71341
- TSO: 71389–71449

== Operations ==
Following the privatisation of British Rail, the Class 315s were divided between First Great Eastern (43 units) and West Anglia Great Northern (18 units). The leasing company Eversholt Rail Group has owned the entire Class 315 fleet since privatisation.

=== One / National Express ===
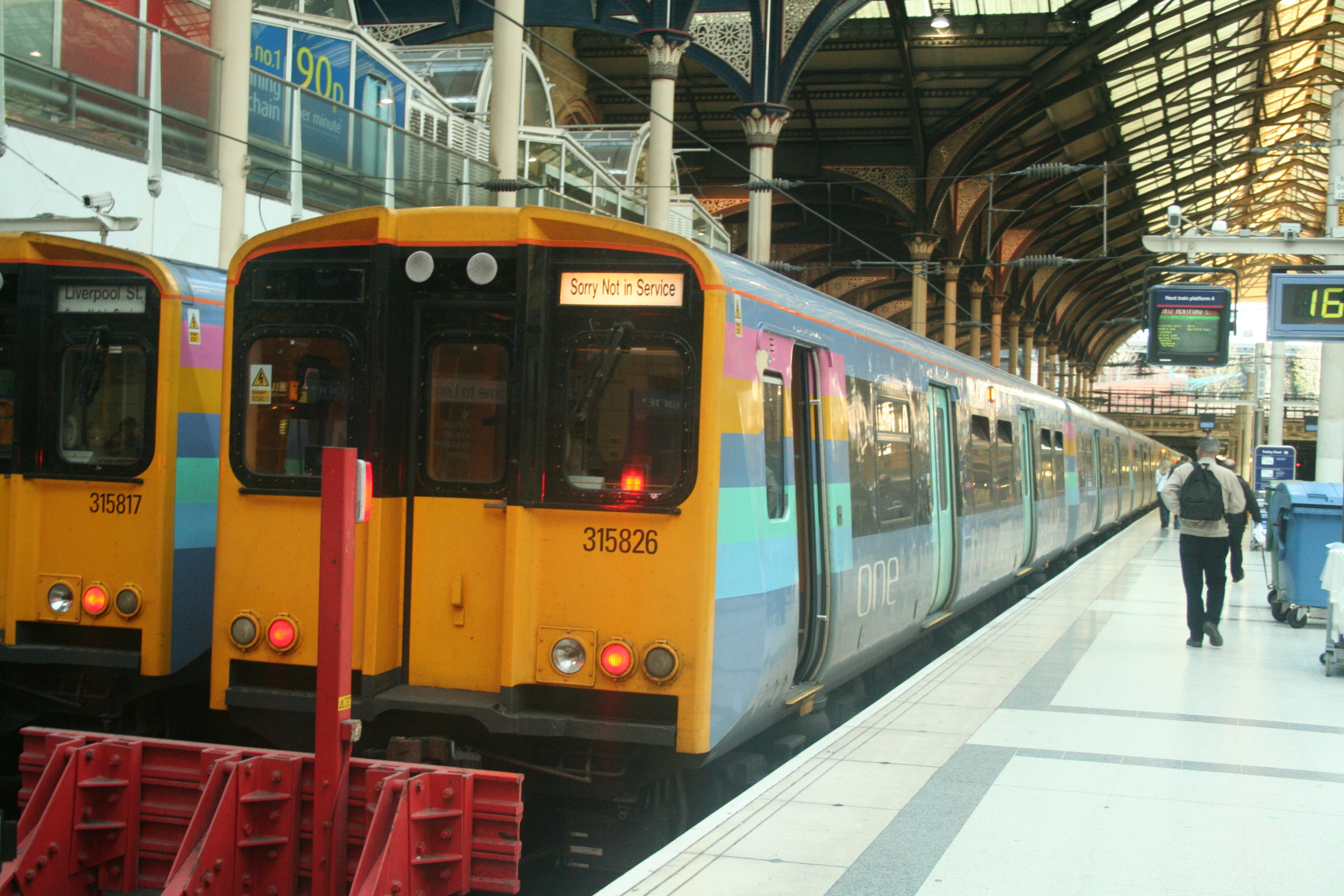
'One' Anglia Class 315s at Liverpool Street in 2007

From April 2004, National Express East Anglia (NXEA) ran the inaugural Greater Anglia franchise, which combined the previous operations of both First Great Eastern and West Anglia Great Northern and thus combined the two Class 315 fleets. The franchise was initially known as 'One' but was rebranded National Express East Anglia (NXEA) in February 2008.

NXEA contracted with Bombardier to refurbish all 61 units at a cost of £60 million. This commenced in mid-2004 with the ex-First Great Eastern examples, and included the full replacement of door operating mechanisms, passenger windows, and seat covers, substantial replacement of floor coverings, and the installation of CCTV.

=== Greater Anglia and London Overground ===
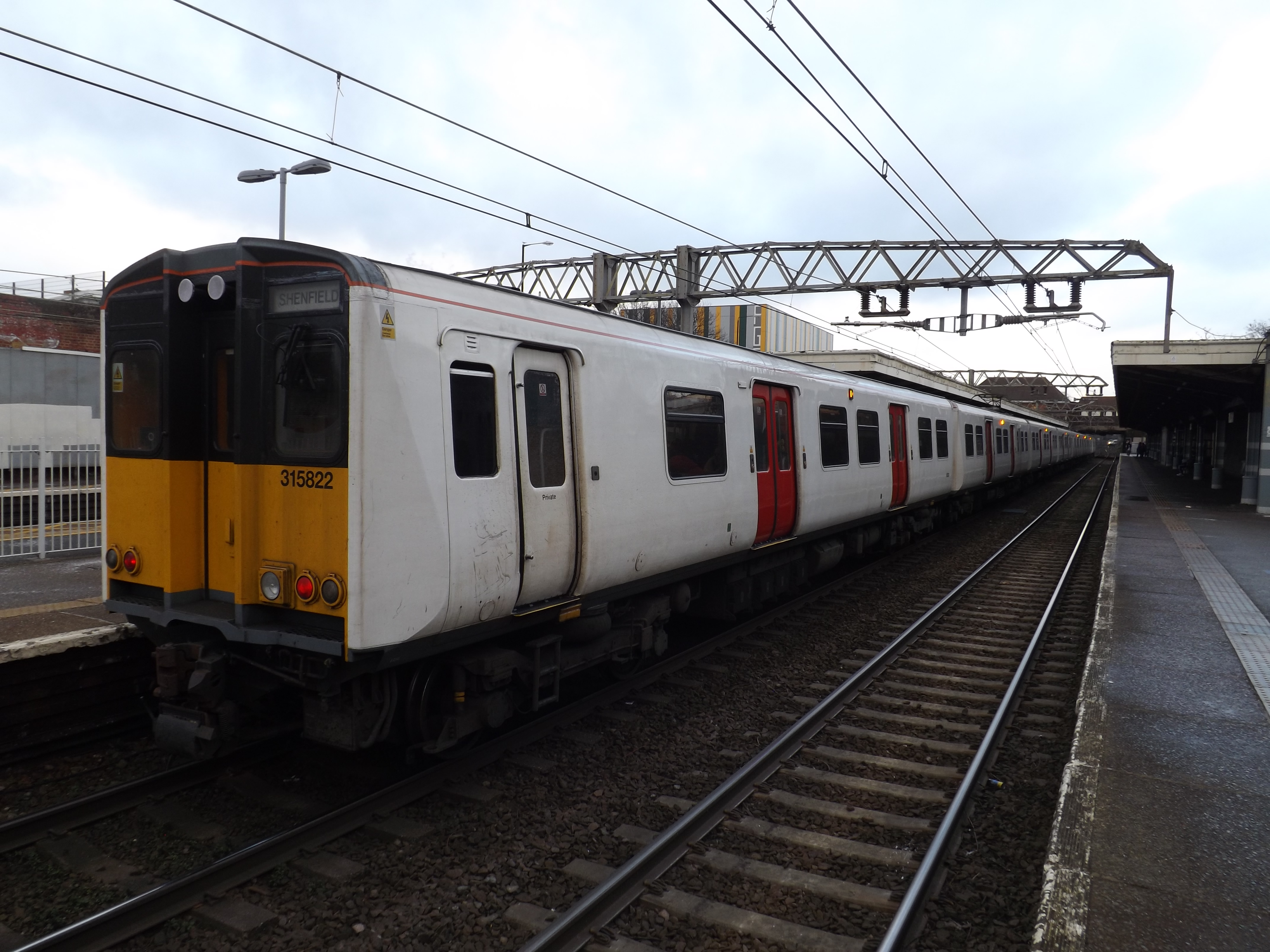
Abellio Greater Anglia Class 315 at Forest Gate in 2015

The Class 315 fleet transferred to new operator Abellio Greater Anglia in February 2012. Abellio repainted the trains in its own livery and commissioned Bombardier to refresh the fleet, which included installation of a new passenger information system with electronic dot-matrix display screens, installation of bays for two wheelchairs and assistance intercoms for passengers in those areas, and accessibility changes to the handrails and inter-car gangways.

Abellio used the fleet for local services between London Liverpool Street to Shenfield on the Great Eastern Main Line (the 'Shenfield Metro' service), and between Liverpool Street and Cheshunt, Enfield Town, and Chingford on the Lea Valley Lines.

They were also used on the Romford–Upminster line, alongside Class 317 units, as well as occasional peak-time services to destinations further from London on the Great Eastern and West Anglia Main Lines such as Bishop's Stortford, Broxbourne, Southminster, and Southend Victoria.

Initially, the Shenfield Metro and Upminster branch line services used only units 315801–315843 and the Lea Valley Lines only 315844–315861, reflecting the allocations of the former franchises, but they were later operated interchangeably out of Ilford EMU Depot.

17 Class 315s were inherited by London Overground when they took over several of Greater Anglia's services on the Lea Valley and Romford–Upminster lines. They were replaced in 2020 by the Class 710.

=== TfL Rail / Elizabeth line ===
The remainder of the fleet was operated by MTR Elizabeth line, who used them for a small number of Elizabeth line services on the Great Eastern Main Line between London Liverpool Street and Shenfield as a continuation of the previous TfL Rail operation.

A farewell tour for the class organised by the Branch Line Society was announced in October 2022 and took place on 26 November, with the last day of service being 9 December 2022.

== Replacement ==
In July 2015, TfL confirmed that it would place a £260 million order for 45 units of Class 710 Aventra trains, which would replace London Overground's Class 315. The Aventras would be introduced on the West Anglia routes in 2018, having taken these over from Abellio Greater Anglia in May 2015. The first units on the Lea Valley lines entered service on 3 March 2020, after a first attempt on 24 February 2020. They replaced all Class 315s on both the Lea Valley lines and the Romford to Upminster branch in October 2020.

TfL Rail also displaced the Class 315s with new Class 345 Aventra from August 2017 on some routes. On 20 October 2018, the first retired unit, 315850, was hauled to C F Booth of Rotherham to be scrapped. The last Elizabeth line unit in service was on 9 December 2022, after which all of the units had either been scrapped, stored or preserved.

== Fleet details ==
Class	Status	Qty.	Year built	Cars per unit	Unit numbers
315	Scrapped	53	1980–1981	4	315801–315809, 315810-315812, 315814–315817, 315818–315827, 315829–315836, 315837–315839, 315842–315844, 315847–315854, 315857–315859, 315860–315861
315	Preserved	1	1980–1981	4	315856
315	TBC	7	1980–1981	4	315813, 315828, 315840–315841, 315845–315846, 315855

=== Vehicle numbering ===
Individual vehicles are numbered in the ranges as follows:

DMSO	PTSO	TSO
64461–64582	71389–71449	71281–71341

DMSO numbers are sequential within units; thus vehicles 64461 and 64462 were in unit 315801, 64463 and 64464 in 315802, and so on.

=== Livery diagrams ===
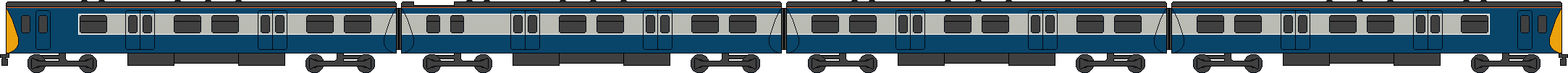
British Rail 1980–1986
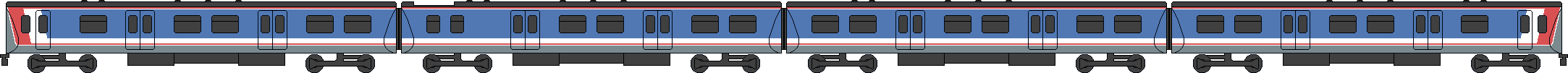
Network SouthEast 1986–1997
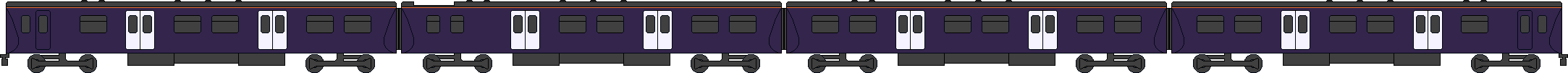
West Anglia Great Northern 2001–2004
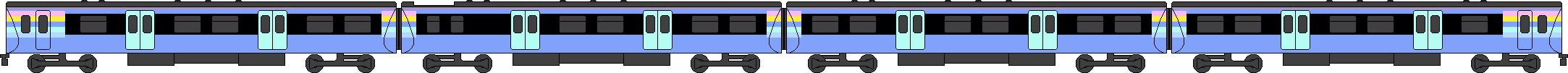
ONE 2005–2008
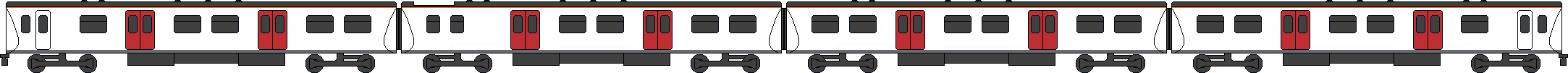
Abellio Greater Anglia 2012–2015
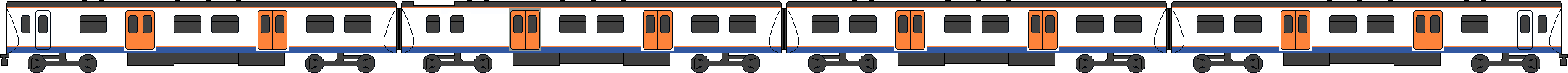
London Overground 2015–2020
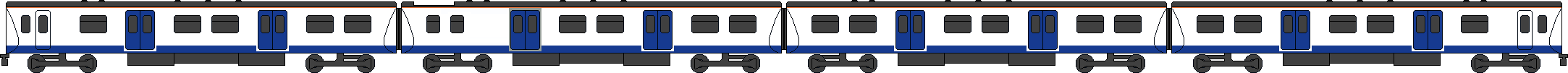
TfL Rail/Elizabeth line 2015–2022

=== Named units ===
The following units have carried names

- 315817 – Transport for London
- 315829 – London Borough of Havering Celebrating 40 years
- 315845 – Herbie Woodward
- 315857 – Stratford Connections

== Preservation ==
On 23 July 2021, the Class 315 Preservation Society announced on their website that they had reached an agreement in principle with Eversholt Rail Group to acquire a Class 315 for preservation, and the sale was confirmed on 1 December 2022. The society had originally planned on acquiring unit 315820, but following the finalisation of the sale agreement stated that they had instead secured unit 315856. In 2026, one Class 315 coach was repainted into First Great Eastern colours.
