= Romford railway station =

Railway station in London, England

Romford
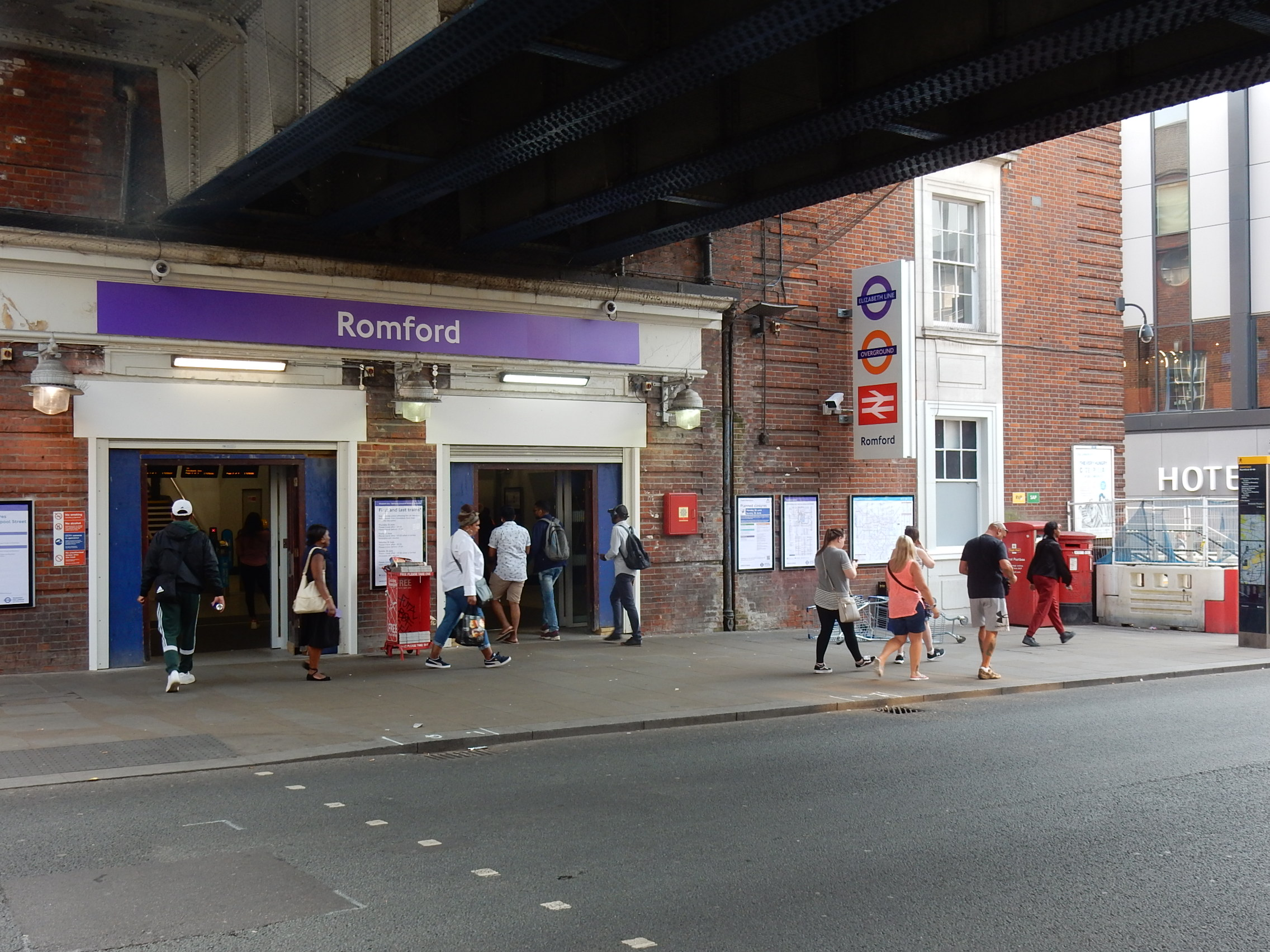
- Station entrance seen in June 2022
- Interactive map of Romford

General information
- Location: Romford
- Local authority: London Borough of Havering
- Managed by: Elizabeth line
- Owner: Network Rail
- Station code: RMF
- Number of platforms: 5
- Accessible: Yes
- Fare zone: 6

National Rail annual entry and exit
- 2020–21: ▼3.133 million
- Interchange: ▼0.223 million
- 2021–22: ▲6.287 million
- Interchange: ▲0.514 million
- 2022–23: ▲11.603 million
- Interchange: ▲0.579 million
- 2023–24: ▲14.820 million
- Interchange: ▲0.997 million
- 2024–25: ▼12.143 million
- Interchange: ▼0.641 million

Key dates
- 20 June 1839: ECR station opened
- 7 June 1893: LTSR Upminster platform opened
- 1934: Stations combined

Other information
- External links: Departures; Facilities
- Coordinates: 51.5749°N 0.1827°E

Romford railway station is an interchange station on the Great Eastern Main Line, serving the town of Romford in the London Borough of Havering, east London. It is 12 miles 30 chains (19.9 km) down the line from London Liverpool Street and is situated between Chadwell Heath and Gidea Park. It is also the northern terminus of the Liberty line of the London Overground. Its three-letter station code is RMF and it is in London fare zone 6.

The station is currently managed by the Elizabeth line. The majority of services that call at Romford are Elizabeth line, but the station is also served by off-peak Greater Anglia trains between Liverpool Street and Southend Victoria.

== History ==
=== East Anglia main line ===
From its inception, the Eastern Counties Railway (ECR) planned a route linking London and Norwich that would take it via Romford. Two routes were considered, that of the current line, and an alternative going through Ilford at Cranbrook Road, then passing near to Gidea Hall and crossing Romford Common approximately following the route of the current A12 before returning to the current railway alignment at Brentwood.

When the line was constructed, the first Romford station opened on 20 June 1839 as a single island platform located to the west of Waterloo Road, and formed the eastern terminus of the initial part of the Eastern Counties Railway from Mile End. Both stations acted as temporary termini, with the line extending east to Brentwood and west to Shoreditch in 1840.

In 1844, the station was relocated to its current position, some 400 metres (1,300 ft) east of the original. Around this time, the gauge of the ECR was changed from 5 ft (1,524 mm) to standard gauge of 1,435 mm (4 ft 8 1/2 in). In 1860, the station was remodelled with platforms on each side of the line with access to the new station by a covered walkway from South Street to the London-bound platform and via an open slope and steps for the country-bound platform. Soon after this, the goods depot, which was situated to the south of the station, was connected to the Ind Coope brewery via a tunnel under the line. Other non-passenger traffic included goods for the Romford Gas Works and for cattle pens accessed from St Andrews Road, which were necessary due to the cattle market held in Romford every Wednesday.

The line became part of the Great Eastern Railway (GER) in 1862. It was grouped into the London and North Eastern Railway (LNER) in 1922.

=== Upminster branch ===
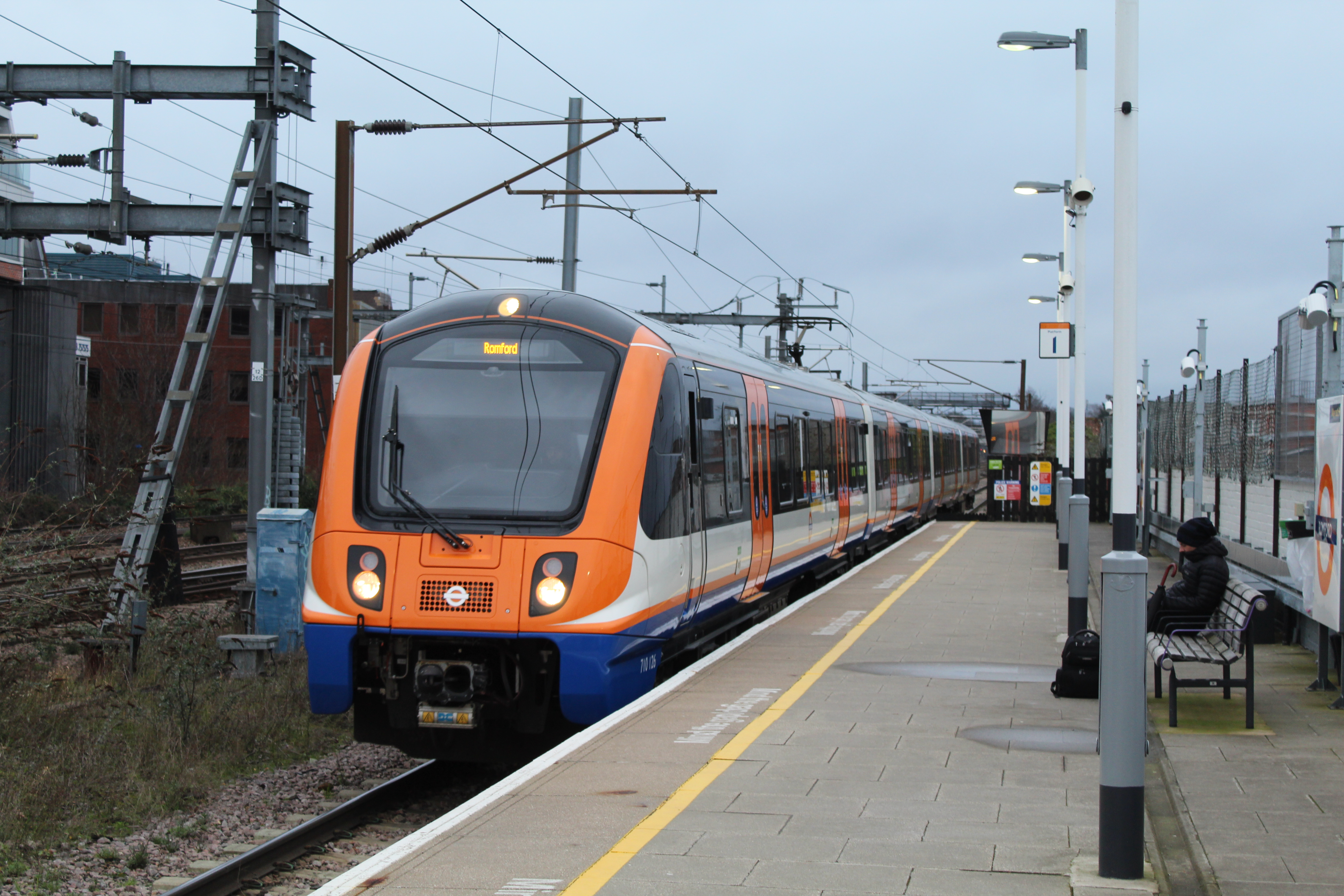
Platform 1 with a London Overground Class 710

The construction of the Tilbury Docks in the 1850s gave expanded opportunities for rail traffic, and three proposals were made for a railway linking Romford to Tilbury. The London, Tilbury and Southend Railway (LT&S) were successful, and on 7 June 1893, the LT&S opened a station in Romford, on their line to Upminster, linking to the already existing connection from Upminster to Grays on the LT&S line to Tilbury. The LT&S had hoped to negotiate with the Great Eastern Railway to use their station, but concerns over fast trains led to the GER declining and a completely new station was built with a single platform and an entrance on the opposite side of South Street to the GER station. A footbridge was built to connect the two stations but was often closed during the day.

In 1934, the entrance to the platform of the line to Upminster was closed and the access to the single platform was provided by the footbridge from the main station platforms.

In May 2015, the Upminster branch line transferred from Abellio Greater Anglia to London Overground. The London Overground service at the station was rebranded as the Liberty line from November 2024.

=== Elizabeth line ===
In the 1930s, increasing traffic on the line led to two additional tracks and platforms being added by the LNER on the north side, the line having been quadrupled to a point west of Romford previously in 1901.

Electric trains started on the line from Liverpool Street to Shenfield in 1949, giving Romford 15 trains per hour to London during peak hours, and 6 trains per hour off-peak, a pattern that continued for over half a century.

In May 2015, the regular Shenfield stopping service transferred to TfL Rail.

In 2017, new Class 345 trains began entering service as the line created by the Crossrail project partially opened under the TfL Rail brand. Platforms 2 to 5 were extended from their length of between 179 metres (196 yd) and 182 metres (199 yd) to accommodate the Crossrail trains, which are over 200 metres (220 yd) long. New lifts, signage, help points, customer information screens and CCTV were installed. The upgrade works were completed in August 2022, after delays due to the COVID-19 pandemic.

TfL Rail services were rebranded as the Elizabeth line on 24 May 2022.

=== Accidents and incidents ===
- On 29 December 1944, one person was killed and three were injured when, in darkness and heavy fog, a Chelmsford–London service passed two signals at danger on the approach to Romford and ran into the rear of a stationary freight train. The passenger train's speed at the moment of impact was about 15 mph (24 km/h). One crew member on the goods train was killed instantly. The Chelmsford train driver was held responsible for the collision in a Ministry of War Transport report.
- On 4 February 2010, two people standing on the platforms at Romford were injured when stone ballast was shed from a freight train passing through the station. Subsequent examination found that the train wagon's doors had not been properly closed when it departed from the goods yard at Acton, bound for Ipswich.
- On 4 November 2024, a person was killed after being struck by a train.

== Services ==
The station is in London fare zone 6. As of the May 2025 timetable, the typical Monday to Friday off-peak service in trains per hour (tph) is:

=== Elizabeth line ===
- 8 tph westbound to Paddington of which 2 continue to Heathrow Terminal 5
- 8 tph eastbound to Shenfield

=== Greater Anglia ===
- 2 tph westbound to London Liverpool Street
- 2 tph eastbound to Southend Victoria

=== London Overground ===
- 2 tph eastbound to Upminster

== Connections ==
A number of day and night-time London Buses routes serve the station.

| Preceding station | National Rail | Following station |
|---|---|---|
| Stratford | Greater Anglia Great Eastern Main Line | Shenfield |
| Preceding station | Elizabeth line | Following station |
| Chadwell Heath towards Heathrow Terminal 5 | Elizabeth line | Gidea Park towards Shenfield |
| Preceding station | London Overground | Following station |
| Terminus | Liberty line Romford–Upminster line | Emerson Park towards Upminster |
Historical railways
| Stratford | Anglia Railways London Crosslink | Ingatestone |
| | Abandoned works | |
| Crowlands | Great Eastern Railway Great Eastern Main Line | Gidea Park |
