= Gidea Park railway station =

National Rail station in London, England

Gidea Park
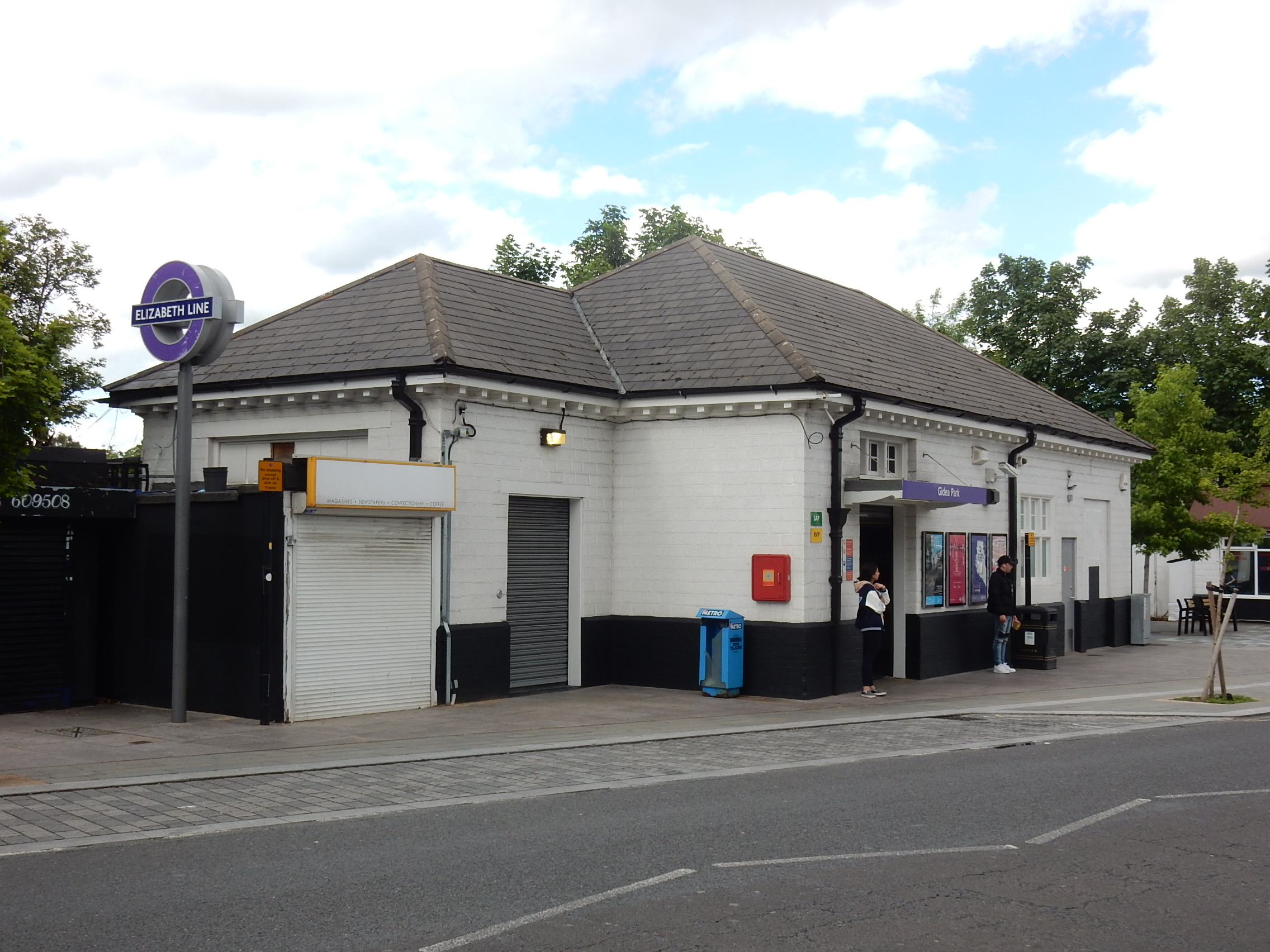
- Station entrance seen in May 2022

General information
- Location: Gidea Park, Havering
- Coordinates: 51.582°N 0.2063°E
- Owner: Network Rail
- Manager: Elizabeth line
- Platforms: 4

Construction
- Accessible: Yes

Other information
- Station code: GDP
- Fare zone: 6
- Website: Official website

History
- Opened: 1 December 1910
- Former names: Squirrels Heath and Gidea Park (1910–1913); Gidea Park and Squirrels Heath (1913–1969)

Passengers

National Rail annual entry and exit
- 2021–22: ▲1.684 million
- 2022–23: ▲2.805 million
- 2023–24: ▲3.610 million
- 2024–25: ▼2.998 million
- 2025–26: ▲3.193 million
Location
- Location in Havering

Gidea Park railway station is on the Great Eastern Main Line, serving the neighbourhood of Gidea Park in Romford, located in the London Borough of Havering, east London. It is 13 miles 41 chains (21.7 km) down the line from London Liverpool Street and is situated between Romford and Harold Wood. Its three-letter station code is GDP and it is in London fare zone 6. The station is managed and served by the Elizabeth line.

== History ==
The station, constructed in a cutting, was opened as Squirrels Heath & Gidea Park on 1 December 1910 by the Great Eastern Railway on that company's main line out of London Liverpool Street. The station consisted of two island platforms with access via a footbridge, giving four platform faces despite the line being of two tracks beyond the station environs. The station signal box was elevated on a set of girders spanning the two central tracks, and there was a goods shed and coal staithes at the country end of the station on the south side of the line controlled by an additional signal box. Immediately beyond the goods facilities was the building known as the "Romford Factory" which had been the original locomotive works for the Eastern Counties Railway from 1843 until the opening of Stratford Works in 1847, and remained in use by the railway working on the manufacture and repair of canvas wagon sheets. The line through Romford and Gidea Park as far as Shenfield was quadrupled in 1930 to provide increased capacity and additional carriage sidings were added on the north side of the line opposite the goods facilities as part of these works. The order of words in the station name was switched to Gidea Park & Squirrels Heath in late 1913 and the "Squirrels Heath" suffix was dropped by British Rail in February 1969.

=== Accidents and incidents ===
On 2 January 1947, in darkness and dense fog, an express train from London to Peterborough, hauled by LNER Class B17 4-6-0 No. 1602 Walsingham, passed a signal at danger and collided with a stopping service bound for Southend Victoria as it started to depart from Gidea Park on the country-bound main line. The Peterborough train was travelling at an estimated 30 to 35 mph on impact, which destroyed the rear three coaches of the Southend train. Seven people were killed in the crash and 45 were hospitalised. Two of the four lines through the station were reopened within two hours, and the other two followed the next day.

External videos
- Footage of the aftermath of the 1947 crash at Gidea Park – British Pathé

=== Elizabeth line ===
In 2017, new Class 345 trains began entering service as the line created by the Crossrail project partially opened under the TfL Rail brand. The platforms at Gidea Park were extended from their current length of 184 metres (201 yd) to accommodate the new Crossrail trains which are over 200 metres (220 yd) long once extended to nine carriages. New lifts, signage, help points, customer information screens and CCTV were installed and the footbridge and carriage-sidings refurbished. Elizabeth line services began on 24 May 2022 and through services to Paddington commenced on 6 November 2022.

== Design ==
The station has step-free access to all platforms and is accessibility classification category A.

== Services ==
The stations is in London fare zone 6. All services at Gidea Park are operated by the Elizabeth line using Class 345 EMUs.

The typical Monday to Friday off-peak service in trains per hour is:

- 8 tph to London Paddington of which 2 continue to Heathrow Terminal 5
- 8 tph to Shenfield

During the peak hours, the station is served by a number of additional services to and from London Liverpool Street (mainline platforms) that start and terminate at Gidea Park.

On Sundays, the service to and from Shenfield is reduced to 4 tph, with alternating services starting and terminating at Gidea Park.

== Connections ==
London Buses routes 294, 496 and school routes 649, 650 and 674 serve the station.

Preceding station	Elizabeth line	Following station
Romford towards Heathrow Terminal 5	Elizabeth line	Harold Wood towards Shenfield
