= British Rail Class 306 =

Class of British electric multiple unit trains

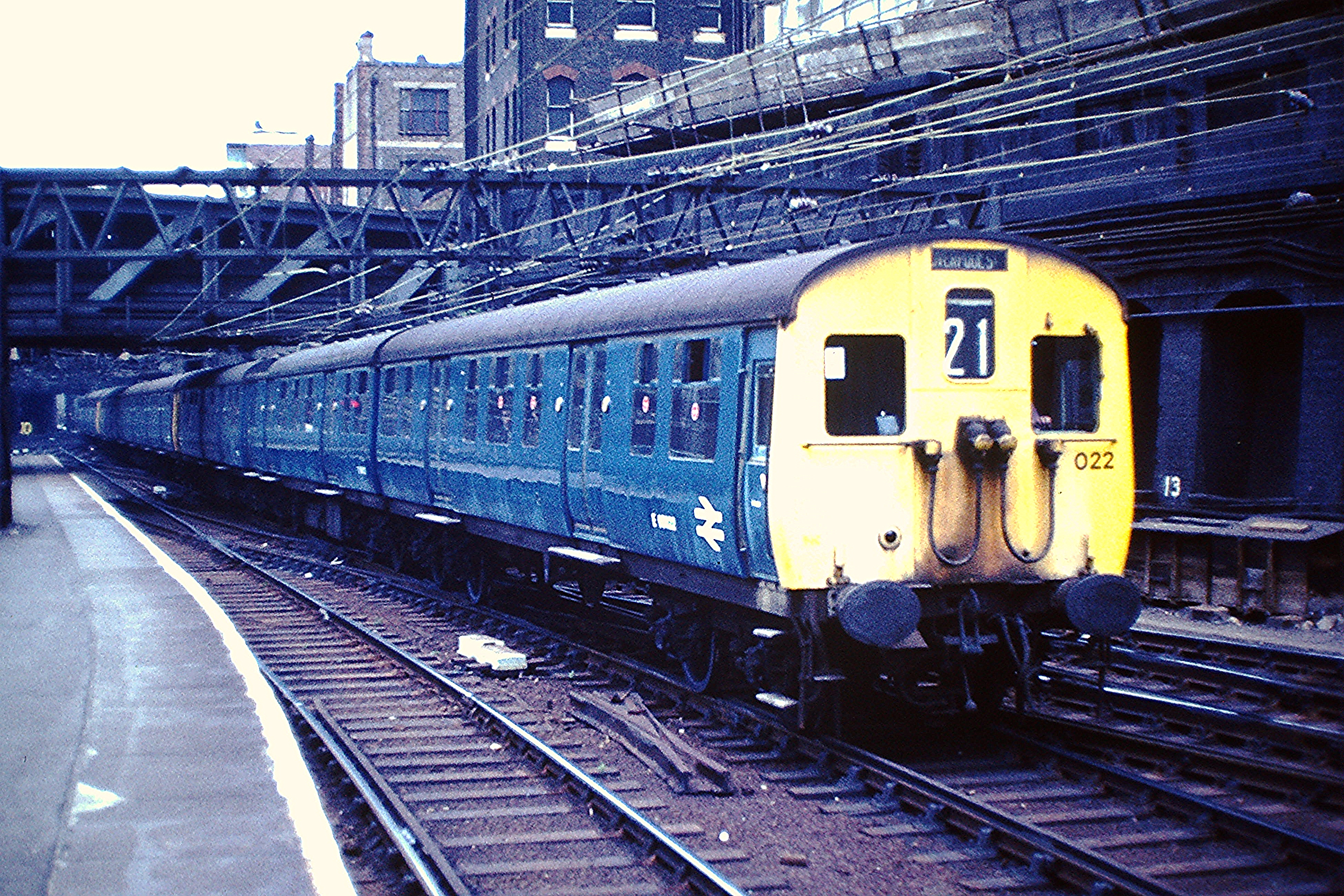
- Class 306 at Liverpool Street in 1975
- In service: 1949–1981
- Manufacturer: Metro Cammell and BRCW
- Order no.: 363: 65201–65292; 364: 65401–65492; 365: 65601–65692
- Constructed: 1949
- Refurbished: Rebuilt 1959–1961
- Number built: 92 trainsets
- Number scrapped: 91
- Formation: 3 cars per trainset.: As built: DMBSO+TSO+DTSO; As rebuilt: DMSO+TBSO+DTSO
- Diagram: BR TOPS codes rebuilt units: EA203 DMSO; EE211 DTSO; EJ201
- Design code: AM6
- Fleet numbers: 306001–306092 (sets); 65201–65292 (DMBSO later DMSO); 65401–65492 (TSO later TBSO); 65601–65692 (DTSO)
- Capacity: 48S (DMBS0) rebuilt 62S (DMSO); 68S (TSO) rebuilt 46S (TBSO); 60S (DTSO)
- Operators: British Rail
- Depots: Ilford
- Lines served: Liverpool Street–Shenfield, Great Eastern Suburban

Specifications
- Car body construction: Steel
- Train length: 177 ft 7 in (54.13 m)
- Car length: 60 ft 4 1/4 in (18.396 m) (DMSO); 55 ft 0 1/2 in (16.777 m) (TBSO); 55 ft 4 1/4 in (16.872 m) (DTSO)
- Width: 9 ft 3 in (2.82 m)
- Height: 13 ft 1 in (3.99 m)
- Doors: Bi-parting sliding
- Articulated sections: 3
- Maximum speed: 75 mph (121 km/h)
- Weight: 105 long tons (107 t; 118 short tons) (total); 51.7 t (50.9 long tons; 57.0 short tons) (DMSO); 26.4 t (26.0 long tons; 29.1 short tons) (TBSO); 27.9 t (27.5 long tons; 30.8 short tons) (DTSO)
- Traction motors: 4 × Crompton Parkinson
- Power output: 4 × 157 hp (117 kW)
- Electric system(s): 1500 V DC Overhead line (original); 6.25 kV and 25 kV 50 Hz AC Overhead line (rebuilt)
- Current collection: Pantograph
- UIC classification: Bo′Bo′+2′2′+2′2′
- Bogies: Thompson / LNER ED6 / ET6
- Braking system(s): Air (EP/Auto)
- Safety system(s): AWS
- Coupling system: Screw
- Multiple working: Within class
- Track gauge: 4 ft 8 1/2 in (1,435 mm)

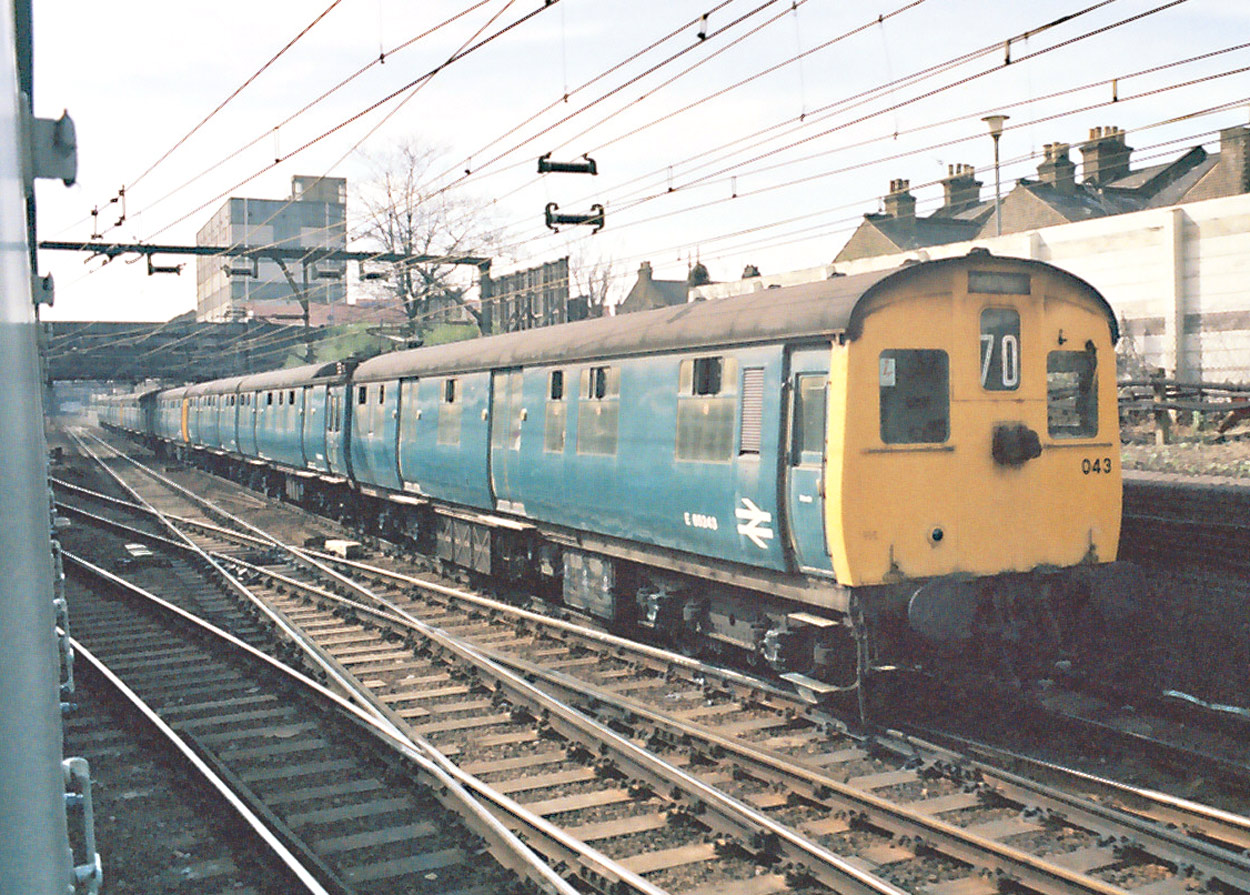
View of the former Motor Brake Second Open (MBSO) vehicle showing the modified (raised) roofline above the cab when the pantograph was relocated to the centre carriage

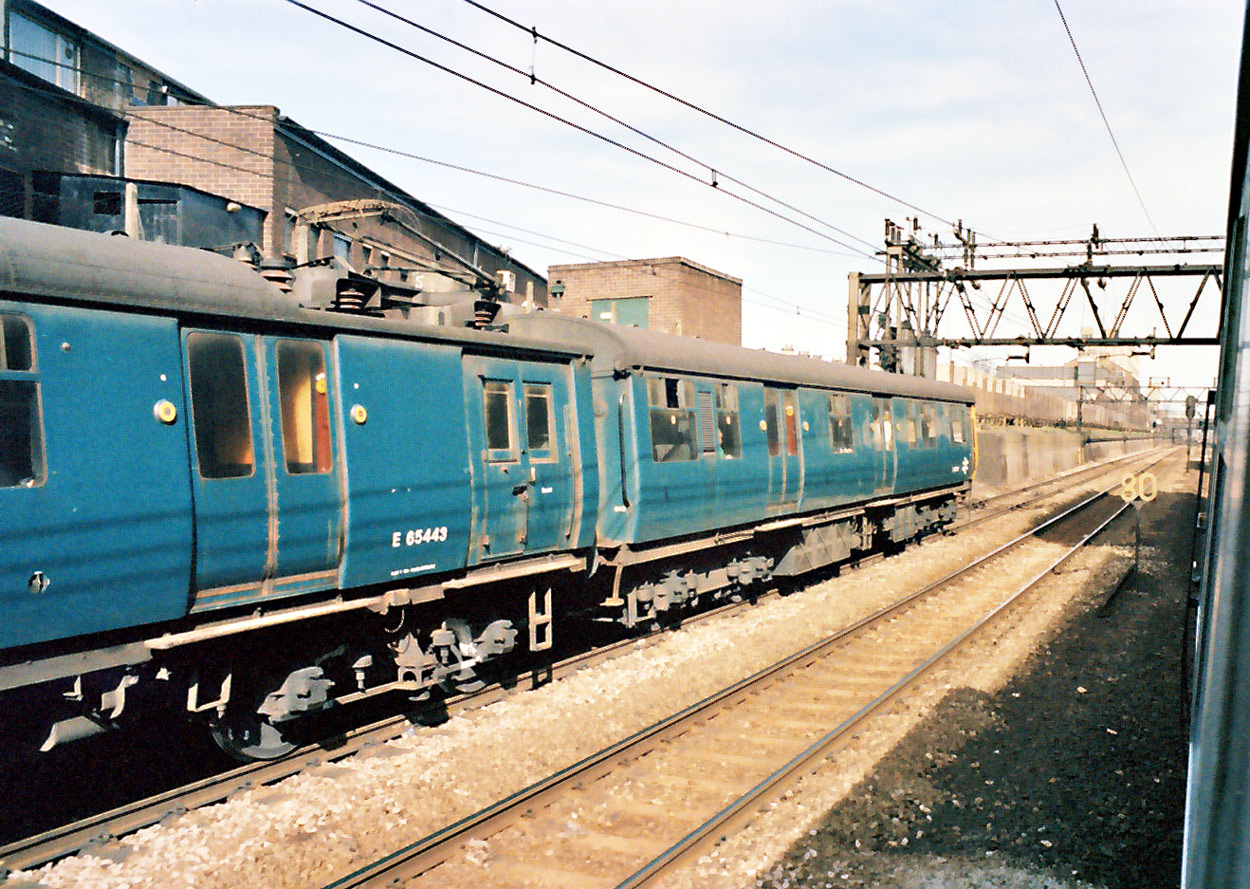
A side view of the centre carriage showing the Stone Faiveley AMBR pantograph and the guards' section below

The British Rail Class 306 was a fleet of electric multiple unit (EMU) trains introduced in 1949. It consisted of 92 three-car trains which were used on the Great Eastern Main Line between Shenfield and London Liverpool Street.

== Overview ==
Class 306 trains were built to a pre-Second World War design by Birmingham Railway Carriage and Wagon Company (Driving Trailer) and Metro Cammell (Driving Motor Brake and Trailer) and were equipped with Metrovick traction equipment Crompton Parkinson traction motors. Each carriage featured two sets of twin pneumatic sliding passenger doors, which could be opened by either the guard or the passengers, who could use buttons fitted inside and outside the doors. The order was placed by the LNER in 1938, but official delivery did not commence until February 1949.

When built the trains were energised at 1,500 V direct current (DC) which was collected from overhead wires by a diamond pantograph located above the cab on the Motor Brake Second Open (MBSO) vehicle.

From 1959 to 1961 the overhead wires were re-energised at 25 kV alternating current (AC) (and 6.25 kV AC in the inner London areas where headroom for the overhead wires was reduced) and the trains were rebuilt to use this different electrical system. A transformer and rectifier unit was fitted to the underframe between the bogies of the intermediate Trailer Brake Second (TBS) and the pantograph, now a more modern Stone Faiveley AMBR design, was moved to the roof of this carriage. Because this reduced the headroom inside the train, the guard's compartment was relocated to be directly below the pantograph. The trains were then numbered 001–092 with the last two digits of each carriage number (LNER coaching series numbers used) the same as the unit number.

== Operation ==
Units being made up of three coaches, trains were formed up to three units (nine coaches) although off-peak trains formed of only two units (six coaches) could be seen. This meant that the standard formation could carry 528 seated passengers plus another 696 standing, making 1,224 passengers, compared with about 1,000 passengers in the steam trains that they replaced.

There is a record of a single three-coach unit hauling a Class 47 and train into Chelmsford after the locomotive failed on a London Liverpool Street-to-Norwich express.

=== Formations ===
The 92 units were originally numbered 01 to 92, becoming 001 to 092 upon conversion for AC operation. Coach numbers were:

- DMSO: 65201 to 65292
- TBSO: 65401 to 65492
- DTSO: 65601 to 65692

In all cases the last two digits of the unit number matched those of the coach numbers. The whole fleet was allocated to Ilford depot.

== Withdrawal and preservation ==
The Class 306 trains were withdrawn in the early 1980s. Unit 306017 was preserved at Ilford depot; it had been repainted in a near-original green livery, albeit with a yellow warning panel on the front to comply with then-current safety regulations. In the early 2000s it was restored to operational condition by First Great Eastern.

The unit was later in store at MoD Kineton awaiting the resolving of issues such as asbestos contamination. The contamination was removed at Eastleigh Works and the unit was transferred by rail to the East Anglian Railway Museum in June 2011 for display as an exhibit, under a four-year loan agreement from the National Railway Museum. It was moved to Locomotion: the National Railway Museum at Shildon in October 2018 so that it could be assessed before restoration. It is scheduled to move to York when space becomes available.

== See also ==
- Class 506 EMUs – similar to the Class 306 EMUs, but built for the Manchester–Sheffield–Wath electric railway
