= He =

He or HE may refer to:

== Arts, entertainment, and media ==
=== Films ===
- He (film), a 2012 Irish film
- HE..., a 2011 film

=== Literature ===
- "He" (short story), a 1926 short story by H. P. Lovecraft
- "He", a 1927 short story by Katherine Anne Porter
- He, a novel by John Connolly about Stan Laurel

=== Music ===
- "He" (song), a 1955 Christian song written by Jack Richards and Richard Mullan
- "He", a song by Jars of Clay from the 1995 album Jars of Clay (album)

=== Other media ===
- He, a threat level in the Korean video game Lobotomy Corporation

== Language ==
- He (letter), the fifth letter of the Semitic abjads
- He (Georgian letter), a letter in the Georgian scripts
- He (pronoun), a pronoun in Modern English
- He (kana), one of the Japanese kana (へ in hiragana and ヘ in katakana)
- Ge (Cyrillic), a Cyrillic letter called He in Ukrainian
- Hebrew language (ISO 639-1 language code: he)

== People ==
- He (surname), Chinese surname, sometimes transcribed Hé or Ho; includes a list of notable individuals so named
- Zheng He (1371–1433), Chinese admiral
- He (和) and He (合), collectively known as 和合二仙 (He-He er xian, "Two immortals He"), two Taoist immortals known as the "Immortals of Harmony and Unity"
- Immortal Woman He, or He Xiangu, one of the Eight Immortals of Taoism

== Places ==
- He County, Anhui, China
- He River, or Hejiang (贺江), a tributary of the Xi River in Guangxi and Guangdong
- Hebei, abbreviated as HE, a province of China (Guobiao abbreviation HE)
- Hessen, abbreviated as HE, a state of Germany

== Science and technology ==
=== Biology and medicine ===
- Hektoen enteric agar, commonly used in microbiology to identify certain organisms
- Hemagglutinin esterase, a viral protein
- Hematoxylin and eosin stain, a popular staining method in histology
- Hepatic encephalopathy

=== Other sciences ===
- Helium, symbol He, a chemical element
- High explosive
- Holocene Era or Human Era, the year count system of the Holocene calendar
  - Holocene Epoch, its rough equivalent
- Homomorphic encryption

== Other uses ==
- Hé (Chinese pastry)
- Heathrow Express, an airport rail link between London Heathrow Airport and Paddington
- Heinkel Flugzeugwerke (in aircraft model prefixes)
- Higher education
- His Eminence, a religious title
- His or Her Excellency, a political title
- Hurricane Electric, a global Internet service provider

== See also ==
- Hezhou (disambiguation)
