= ET =

ET, Et or et may refer to:

== Arts, entertainment, and media ==
=== E.T. the Extra-Terrestrial franchise ===
- E.T. the Extra-Terrestrial, a 1982 film
  - E.T. the Extra-Terrestrial (video game), 1982
  - E.T. the Extra-Terrestrial (soundtrack), score album by John Williams
  - E.T. the Extra-Terrestrial (album), an audiobook album by Michael Jackson and the original cast
  - E.T. (character), the titular alien from the film

=== Other film and TV ===
- Eastern Television, a Taiwanese television network
- Entertainment Tonight, an American television entertainment news show
- Etharkkum Thunindhavan, a 2022 Indian film

=== Music ===
- Electro Team, a Croatian hip hop/eurodance band
- English Teacher, an English band
- "E.T." (song), by Katy Perry, 2011
- "E.T.", a song by Toy-Box from Fantastic, 1999
- "ET (Extraterrestrial)", a song by OutKast from ATLiens, 1996

=== Publications ===
- ET-lehti, a Finnish lifestyle magazine
- Empire Times, an Australian student newspaper at Flinders University
- The Epoch Times, a newspaper
- Economic Times (disambiguation), several newspapers

== Codes ==
- Energy Transfer Partners, American pipeline company (NYSE stock symbol "ET")
- Estonian language (ISO 639 code "et")
- Ethiopia (ISO 3166-1 country code "et")
  - .et, the country code top-level domain (ccTLD) for Ethiopia
- Ethiopian Airlines (IATA airline designator "ET")
- Ethiopia (aircraft registration prefix ET)

== Science and technology ==
=== Biology and medicine ===
- Educational therapy, for people with learning difficulties
- Embryo transfer, in assisted reproduction
- Endotracheal tube, a catheter inserted through the mouth or nose
- Esotropia, an eye condition producing a "cross-eyed" appearance
- Essential thrombocythemia, a chronic blood cancer
- Essential tremor, a neurological disorder characterized by shaking of hands and limbs
- Evapotranspiration, a sum of evaporation and plant transpiration
- Exchange transfusion, in blood transfusion

=== Chemistry ===
- Electron transfer, the move of an electron from one atom or molecule to another
- Ethyl group, a functional group in organic chemistry

=== Other uses in science and technology ===
- Effective temperature
- Electromagnetic testing
- Electron tomography
- Envelope tracking, a technique to provide a dynamic power supply to RF power amplifier
- Extraterrestrial life
- Köppen climate classification for tundra
- Space Shuttle external tank

== People ==
- Andrew Ettingshausen, rugby league footballer
- E Thi, Burmese fortune teller

== Other uses ==
- Et (Armenian letter), a letter in the Armenian alphabet
- Et (Chinese pastry), a traditional pastry in Guangdong Province
- Et District, in Houaphanh, Laos
- Ampersand punctuation mark (&), originally derived from Latin et
- Electronics Technician, a rating in the US Navy
- Eastern Time Zone, a time zone in North America
- Bureau of Emerging Threats, in the U.S. Department of State

== See also ==
- Extraterrestrial (disambiguation)
