= Los Extraterrestres =

Los Extraterrestres may refer to:

- Los Extraterrestres, a 1983 Argentine film
- Wisin vs. Yandel: Los Extraterrestres, a 2007 album by Wisin & Yandel

== See also ==
- Extraterrestrial (disambiguation)
