= Bombardier Electrostar =

Group of British electric multiple unit trains

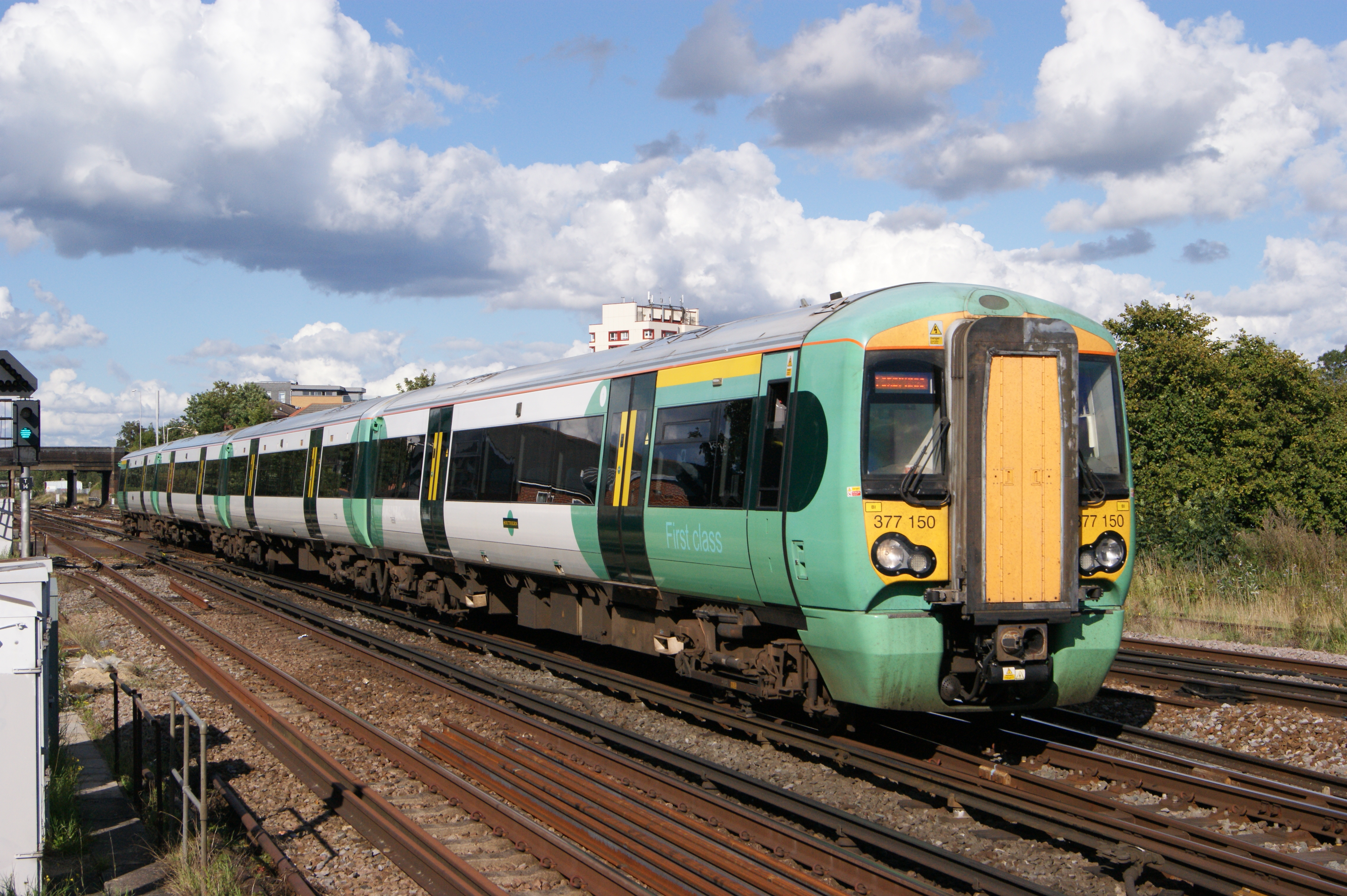
- A Southern Class 377 approaching Norwood Junction, 2015
- Stock type: Electric multiple unit
- In service: 2000–present
- Manufacturers: Adtranz (1999–2001); Bombardier Transportation (2001–2017)
- Built at: Derby Litchurch Lane Works
- Replaced: Class 165; Class 166; Class 310; Class 312; Class 313; Class 317; Class 319; Class 321; Class 332; Class 365; Class 411; Class 421; Class 423; Class 442; Class 455; Class 456; Class 508
- Constructed: 1999–2017
- Refurbished: 2017–2025 (Southern Units)
- Number built: 679 trainsets, 2704 carriages
- Number in service: 679 trainsets
- Successor: Alstom Aventra
- Formation: 3, 4 or 5 cars per trainset
- Capacity: Varies depending on number of carriages and seating configuration, see individual articles for details
- Operators: Current: c2c, Southeastern, Southern, London Overground, Great Northern, Great Western Railway, Gatwick Express, Heathrow Express, Gautrain; Former: Greater Anglia, Connex South Eastern, National Express East Anglia, First Capital Connect, South Eastern Trains, Stansted Express, Thameslink

Specifications
- Car length: Classes 357, 376: DMS: 20.40 m (66 ft 11 in); MS, PTS, TS: 19.99 m (65 ft 7 in); Class 377, 379: DMC, DMS: 20.39 m (66 ft 11 in)
- Width: 2.80 m (9 ft 2 in)
- Height: 3.78 m (12 ft 5 in)
- Maximum speed: Classes 376, 378: 75 mph (120 km/h); Classes 357, 375, 377, 379: 100 mph (160 km/h); Class 387: 110 mph (180 km/h)
- Weight: Class 357 c2c:157.6 t; Classes 375/3, 377/3: 133.1 t; Classes 375/6, 375/7, 377/1, 377/2: 173.6 t
- Power output: 2×373=746 kW (377/3 only); 3×373=1,119 kW (others, third rail); 3×560=1,680 kW (AC mode)
- Electric systems: Overhead line, 25 kV 50 Hz AC; Third rail, 750 V DC
- Current collection: Pantograph (AC); Contact shoe (DC)
- Safety systems: AWS; TPWS; ETCS (Heathrow Express fleet only); ERTMS (East Coast Main Line)
- Track gauge: 1,435 mm (4 ft 8 1/2 in) standard gauge

The Bombardier Electrostar (sold as the ADtranz Electrostar until 2001) is a group of electric multiple unit (EMU) passenger trains manufactured by Bombardier Transportation (formerly Adtranz) at their Derby Litchurch Lane Works, in England, between 1999 and 2017. It has become the most common EMU type in Great Britain since the privatisation of British Rail, with a number of variants. Electrostar trains are most common on high-volume suburban commuter routes around London and on main line services from London to Surrey and the south coast, east to Essex, and north to Cambridge and Stansted Airport.

== History ==
The model shares the same bodyshell and core structure as the Bombardier Turbostar, which is the most common post-privatisation diesel multiple unit (DMU) type; both evolved from the Class 168 Clubman design by ADtranz. The Turbostar and Electrostar platforms are a modular design, sharing the same basic bodyshell and core structure, and optimised for speedy manufacture and easy maintenance. A common underframe, created by seam-welding a number of aluminium alloy extrusions, is covered by body panels and topped by a single piece roof, again made from extruded sections. Car ends (cabs) are made from glass-reinforced plastic and steel, and are bolted onto the main car bodies. Underframe components are collected in "rafts" which are bolted into slots on the underframe. The predominantly aluminium-alloy body gives light weight to help acceleration and energy efficiency.

Transport for London (TfL) announced in August 2006 that it had ordered 48 three- and four-car Electrostar trains for the new London Overground service. These were categorised by Network Rail as Class 378, and entered service in 2009 to replace the Class 313 and Class 508 trains on the North London Line and West London Line, and to provide the opening service on the new East London line extension in 2010.

In 2009, as part of the government's wider rolling stock plan, an order was placed for thirty four-car Class 379 Electrostar units intended for use by National Express East Anglia (now operated by Greater Anglia) on the Stansted Express and West Anglia services. The first of these units entered passenger service on 3 March 2011.

Production of the trains ended in 2017, when unit number 387174 for Great Western Railway was completed at Derby Litchurch Lane Works. The family was superseded by the Alstom Aventra.

The Electrostar was also selected for use on the Gautrain system in South Africa, a new railway between Johannesburg, Pretoria and Johannesburg International Airport. The trains were assembled by UCW Partnership in South Africa from components made in Derby.

== Variants ==
Class	Image	Operator(s)	Introduced	Number	Power	Carriages	Door configuration	End gangways	Notes
357 Electrostar		c2c	1999	74	AC electric	4	"Plug" style	No	
375 Electrostar		Southeastern	1999	112	Dual Voltage/DC electric	3 or 4	"Plug" style	Yes	Class 375 and 377 differ only in their coupler configuration and other minor fittings; all Southern units built as Class 375 have since been converted to Class 377 couplers and re-classed. Minor differences in interior trim remain.
376 Electrostar		Southeastern	2004	36	DC electric	5	Sliding pocket	No	
377 Electrostar		Southern; Southeastern	2002	239	Dual Voltage/DC electric	3, 4 or 5	"Plug" style	Yes	Class 377/6 and Class 377/7s have been built with different exteriors, matching the Class 379s and Class 387s.
378 Capitalstar		London Overground	2008	57	Dual Voltage/DC electric	5	Sliding pocket	Emergency only	The Class 378s were constructed in three separate batches - 24 three car units designated as Class 378/0 with dual voltage capability were built for use on the North London Line and West London Line. 20 four-car DC-only units designated Class 378/1 were built for the East London Line. 13 four car Class 378/2s were also built, and the Class 378/0s had an extra car added to make them Class 378/2s. All were later extended to five cars.
Gautrain Electrostar		Gautrain	2010	24	AC electric	4	"Plug" style	No	
379 Electrostar		Great Northern	2010	30	AC electric	4	"Plug" style	Yes	The Class 379s incorporate some technical features of the proposed Aventra Mark II Electrostar. However they are outwardly similar to Class 375 and Class 377.
387 Electrostar		Great Northern; Gatwick Express; Great Western Railway; Heathrow Express; Southern	2014	107	Dual Voltage	4	"Plug" style	Yes	Class 387s for Thameslink were ordered to cope with extra service before enough Class 700s were built. These transferred to Great Northern, once enough Class 700s were in service. 387/2s have replaced Class 442s on Gatwick Express. Great Western Railway units on the Thames Valley services to replace the 165s and 166s. From 2022, Great Northern operated six Class 387/3s, to allow for some the Class 387/2s to be sent to Southern.

== Bombardier Electrostar routes ==
=== c2c ===
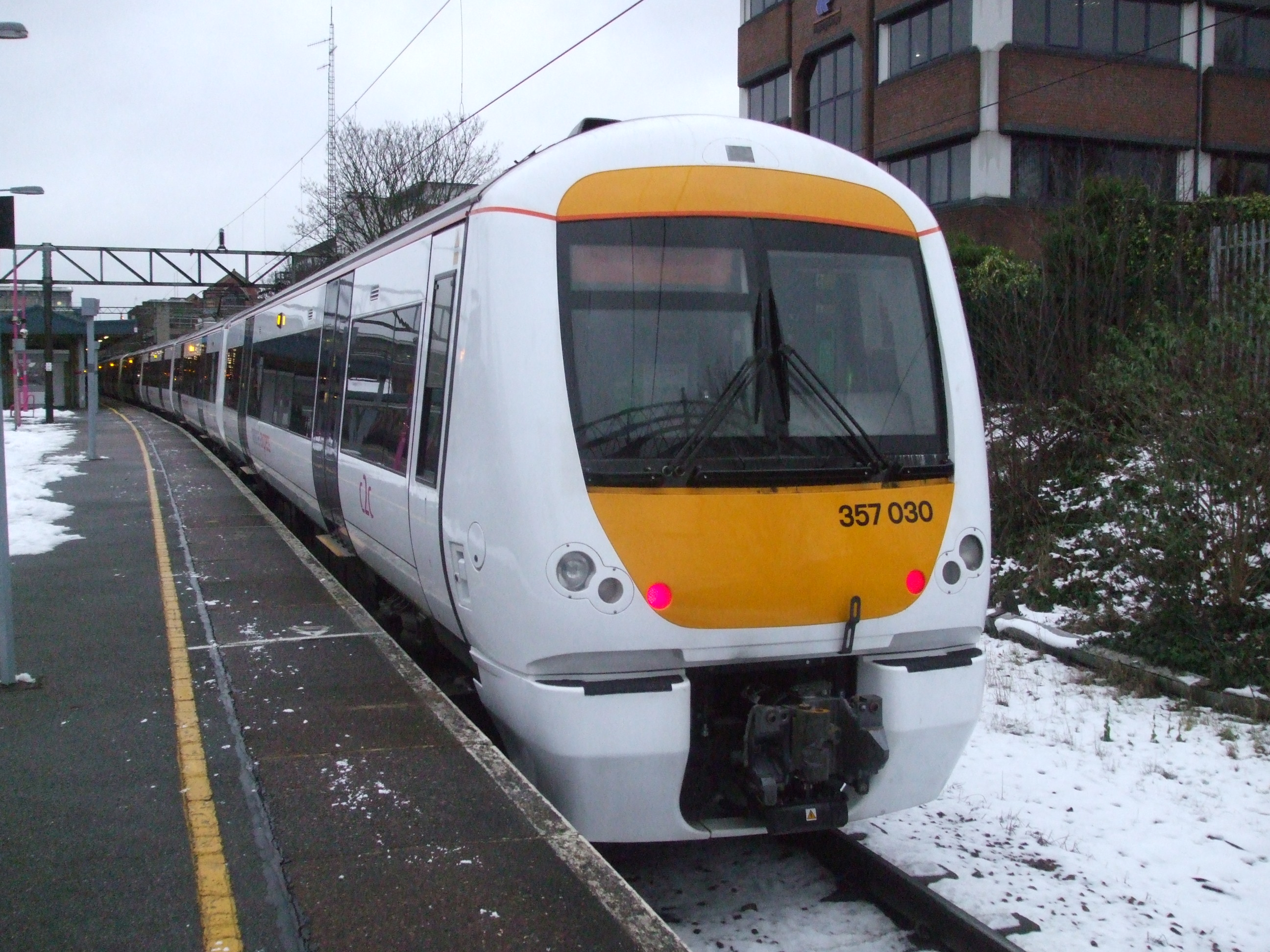
357030 at Barking in National Express c2c livery. Electrostar trains are the new standard on many of London's commuter routes.

c2c uses Class 357 interchangeably on all services down the London, Tilbury and Southend line from Shoeburyness and Southend to London Fenchurch Street.

=== Southeastern ===
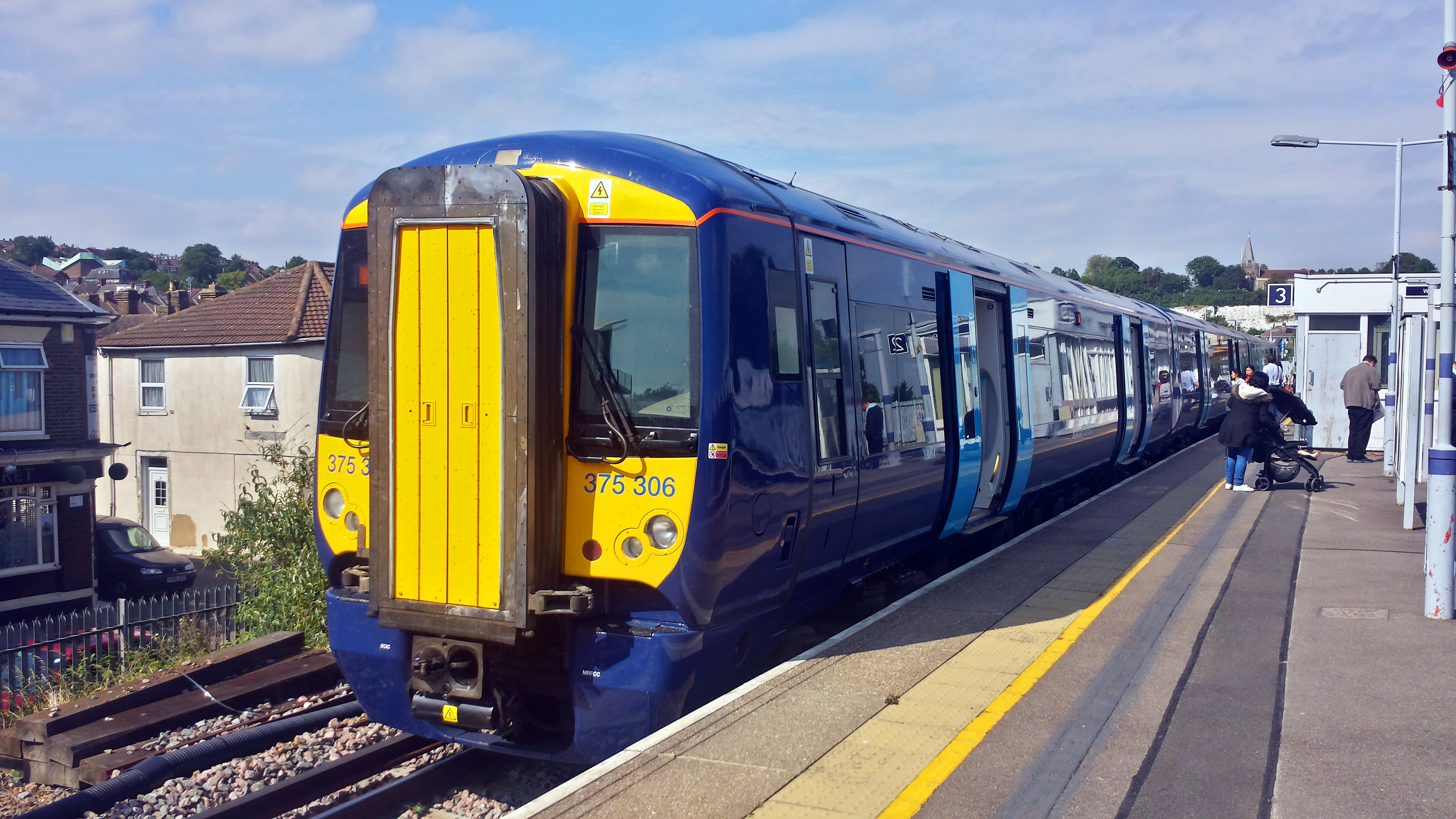
A Southeastern Class 375 Electrostar at Strood.

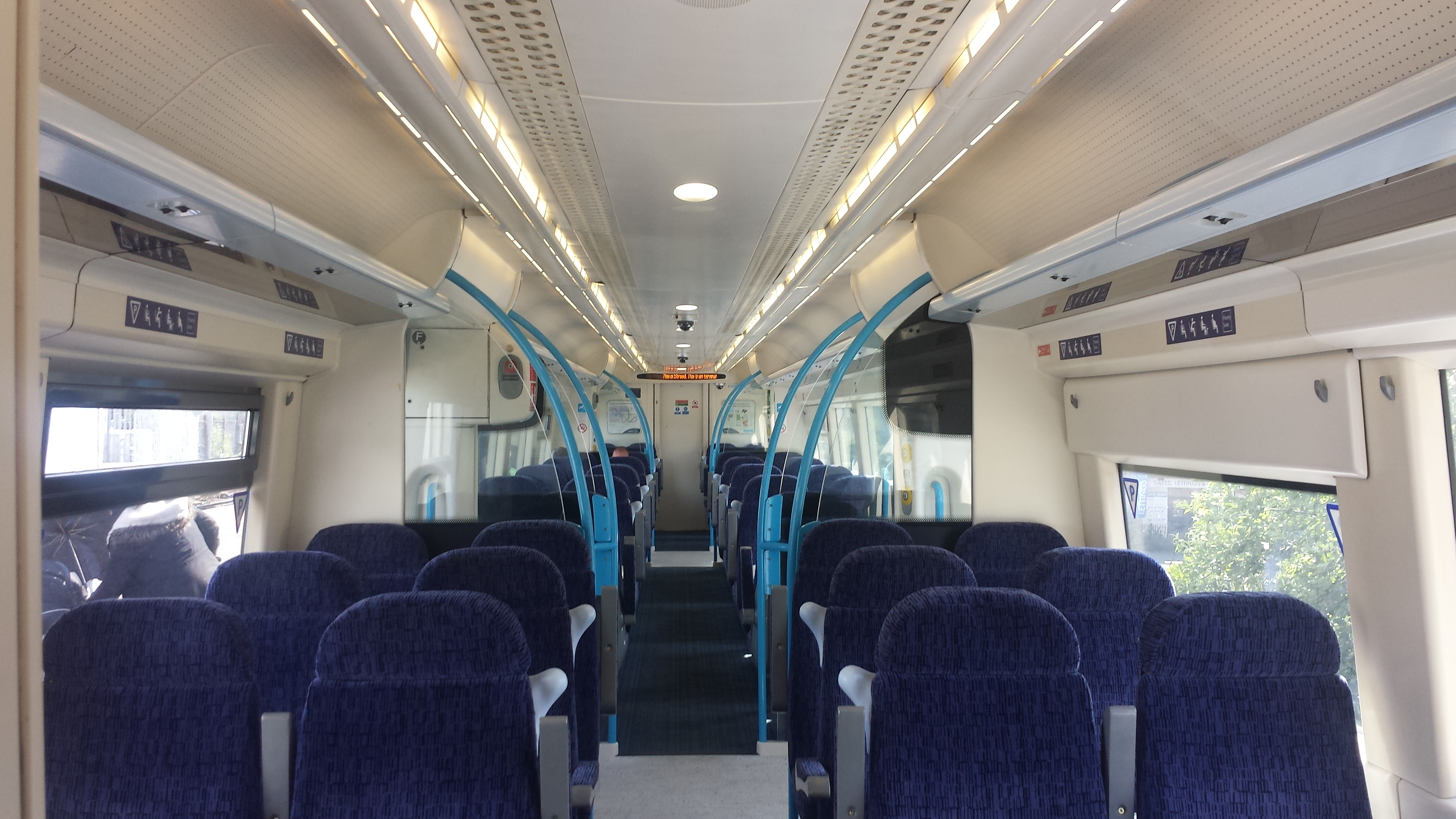
Interior of a Southeastern Class 375 Electrostar

The Class 375 is the backbone of Southeastern's long-distance routes, seeing services on most of its lines originating from its London termini (London Victoria, Charing Cross, Cannon Street and London Bridge) including:

- Chatham Main Line
  - Maidstone East Line
- Medway Valley Line
- South Eastern Main Line
  - Hastings Line
  - Ashford to Ramsgate (via Canterbury West) line
  - Kent Coast Line
- North Kent Line
- Mid Kent Line.

On the outer suburban portions of these above routes, the Class 377/5s and the Class 465/9 Networkers support the Class 375s, but they do not work in multiple together.

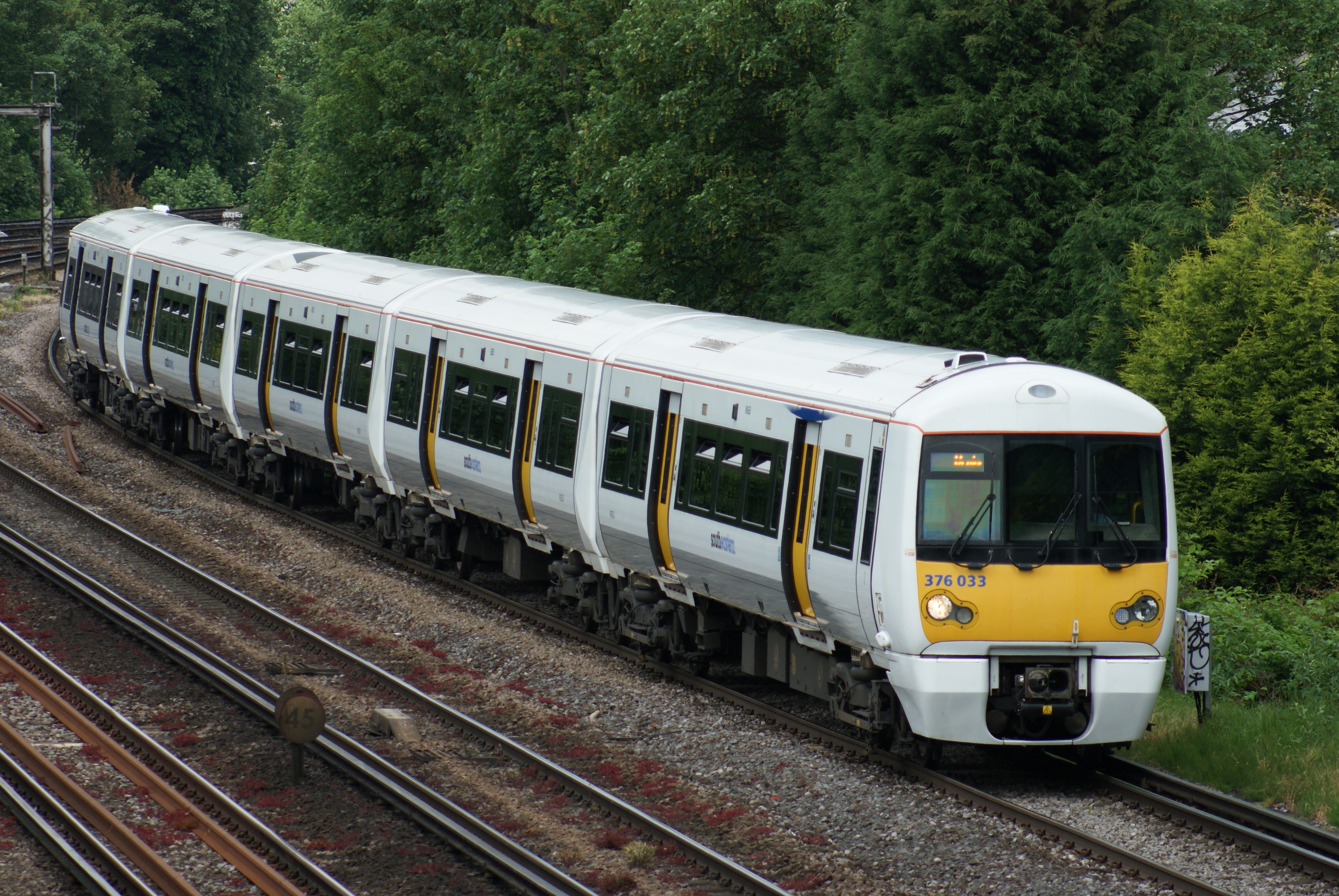
A Southeastern Class 376 Electrostar

The Class 376 operates on the metro routes in suburban London, in conjunction with the Class 707 Desiro Cities, Class 465 and Class 466 Networkers, operating over the London portion of the above lines from the London termini (including Blackfriars) out to Dartford and Sevenoaks):

- North Kent Line (to Gravesend)
- Bexleyheath Line (to Dartford)
- Dartford Loop Line (to Dartford)
- South Eastern Main Line (to Sevenoaks)
- Hayes Line.

This leaves the Bromley North Line, operated by Class 465s (four-car Networkers). The Bromley North Line, Sheerness Line and Medway Valley Line used to be operated exclusively by the Class 466s (2 car Networkers) prior to the introduction of accessibility regulations in January 2020.

=== Southern ===
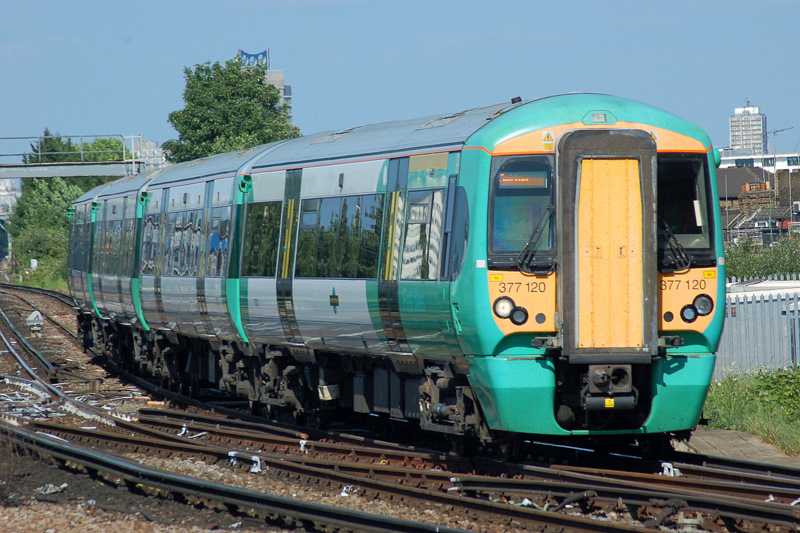
A Southern Class 377

Southern's Class 377 fleet is found on all parts of the network, apart from the non-electrified routes. They frequent metro routes, formerly alongside the Class 455s, until the latter's withdrawal in 2022, and Class 456s until they transferred to South West Trains in 2014.

==== Main lines ====
- Brighton Main Line (Victoria–Gatwick and Brighton)
- East Coastway (Brighton–Eastbourne, Hastings and Ore)
- West Coastway (Brighton–Portsmouth and Southampton)
- Arun Valley Line (Victoria–Horsham, Littlehampton and Chichester)
- West London Line (Clapham Junction–Watford Junction) (using Class 377/2 or dual voltage Class 377/7).

==== Outer suburban ====
- London Victoria–Horsham via Dorking
- London Victoria–East Grinstead
- London Bridge–Horsham via East Croydon
- London Victoria-Reigate
- Redhill-Tonbridge.

==== Suburban ====
Often found on:

- London Bridge-London Victoria, via Sydenham
- London Bridge-Caterham
- London Bridge-Tattenham Corner
- London Victoria–Dorking, via Sutton
- London Victoria–Epsom Downs
- London Victoria-Caterham
- London Victoria-Epsom.

=== London Overground ===
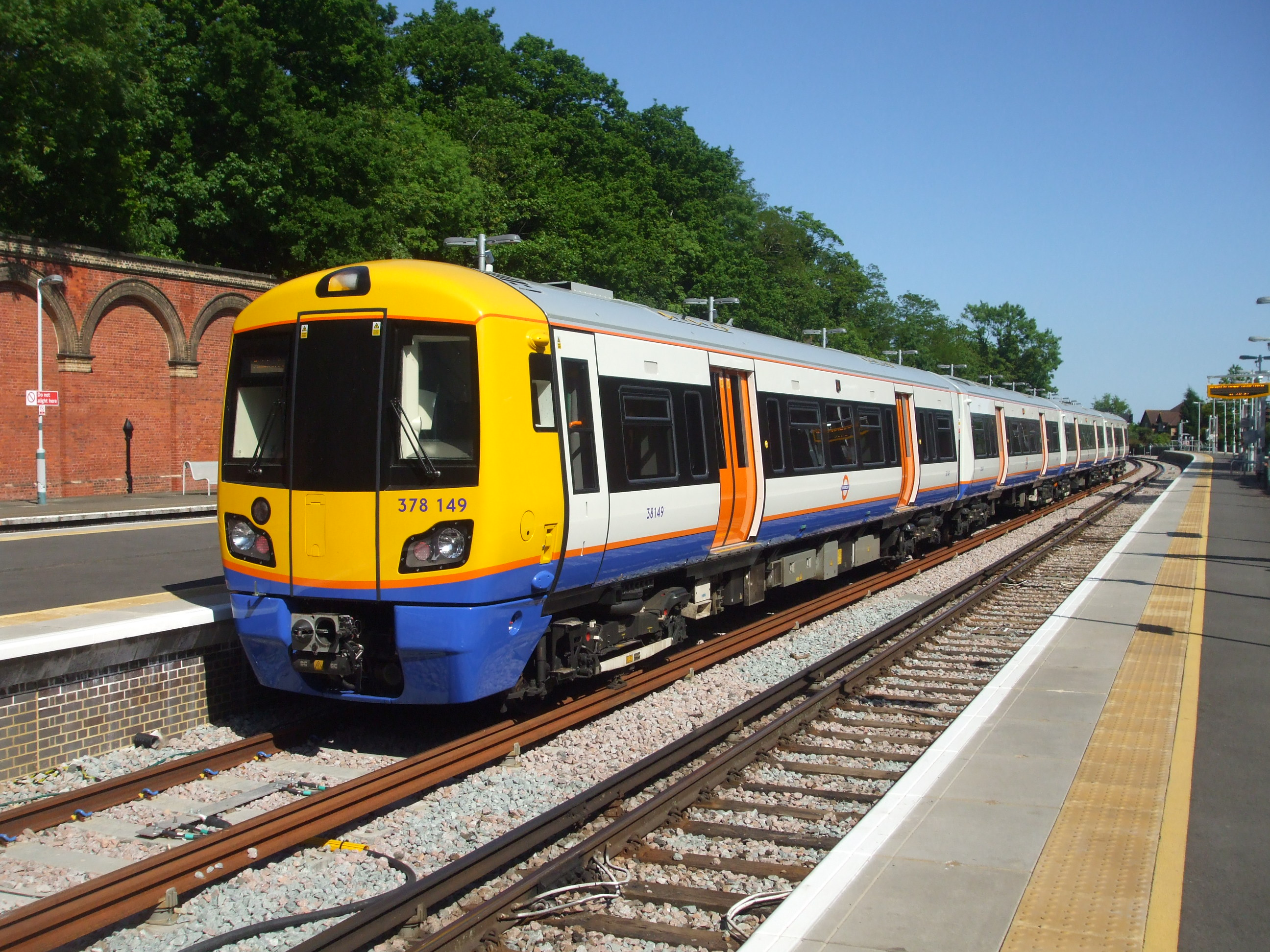
A London Overground Class 378 in TfL livery at Crystal Palace.

London Overground operates Class 378s over four of its six lines around London:

- North London Line (Richmond–Stratford, via Willesden Junction)
- West London Line (Clapham Junction–Willesden Junction, via West Brompton, continuing on the North London Line to Stratford)
- East London Line (Crystal Palace, New Cross or West Croydon–Dalston Junction and Highbury & Islington, via Canada Water)
- South London Line (Clapham Junction–Peckham Rye, and continuing on the East London Line to Dalston Junction).

=== Gautrain (South Africa) ===
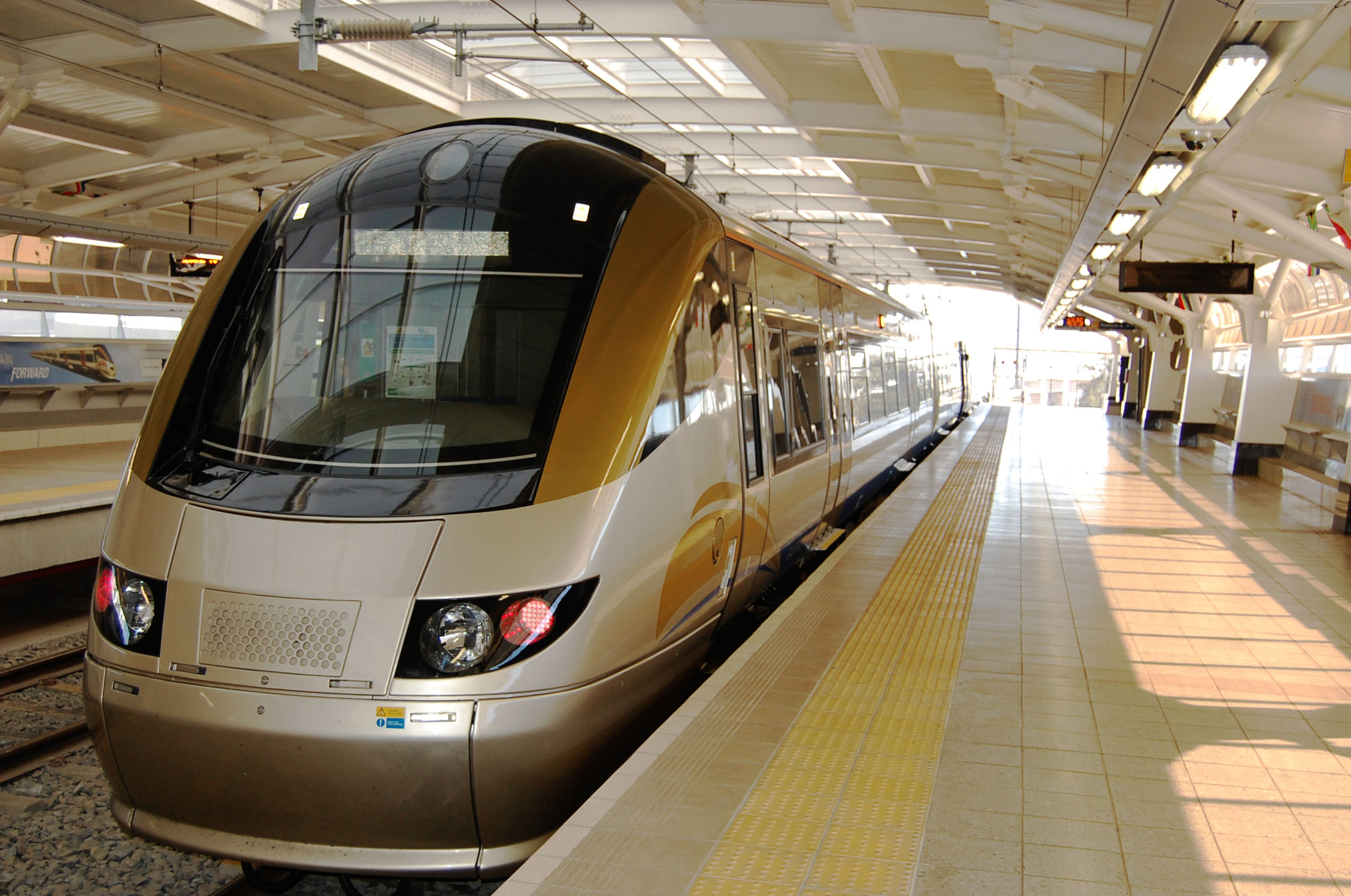
A Gautrain Electrostar at OR Tambo International Airport

On 8 June 2010, the route between Sandton and OR Tambo International Airport in South Africa opened in time for the 2010 FIFA World Cup. The rest between Johannesburg Park Station and Rosebank was to be completed in 2011. This section was actually opened 7 June 2012, the delay caused by work to resolve a water-seepage problem in the single-track tunnel section between Rosebank and Park. Although railways in South Africa use the 1,067 mm (3 ft 6 in) Cape gauge, Gautrain is built to the more expensive standard gauge of 1,435 mm (4 ft 8 1/2 in). According to the Gautrain planning and implementation study, this is done for several reasons, including that standard gauge is safer and more comfortable to passengers. The rolling stock is also easier, quicker and less expensive to obtain than Cape Gauge rolling stock, and standard gauge is also less expensive to maintain as it is more tolerant of track imperfections than Cape Gauge. Standard gauge allows for travel at Gautrain's required speed of 160 km/h (99 mph).

=== Great Western Railway ===
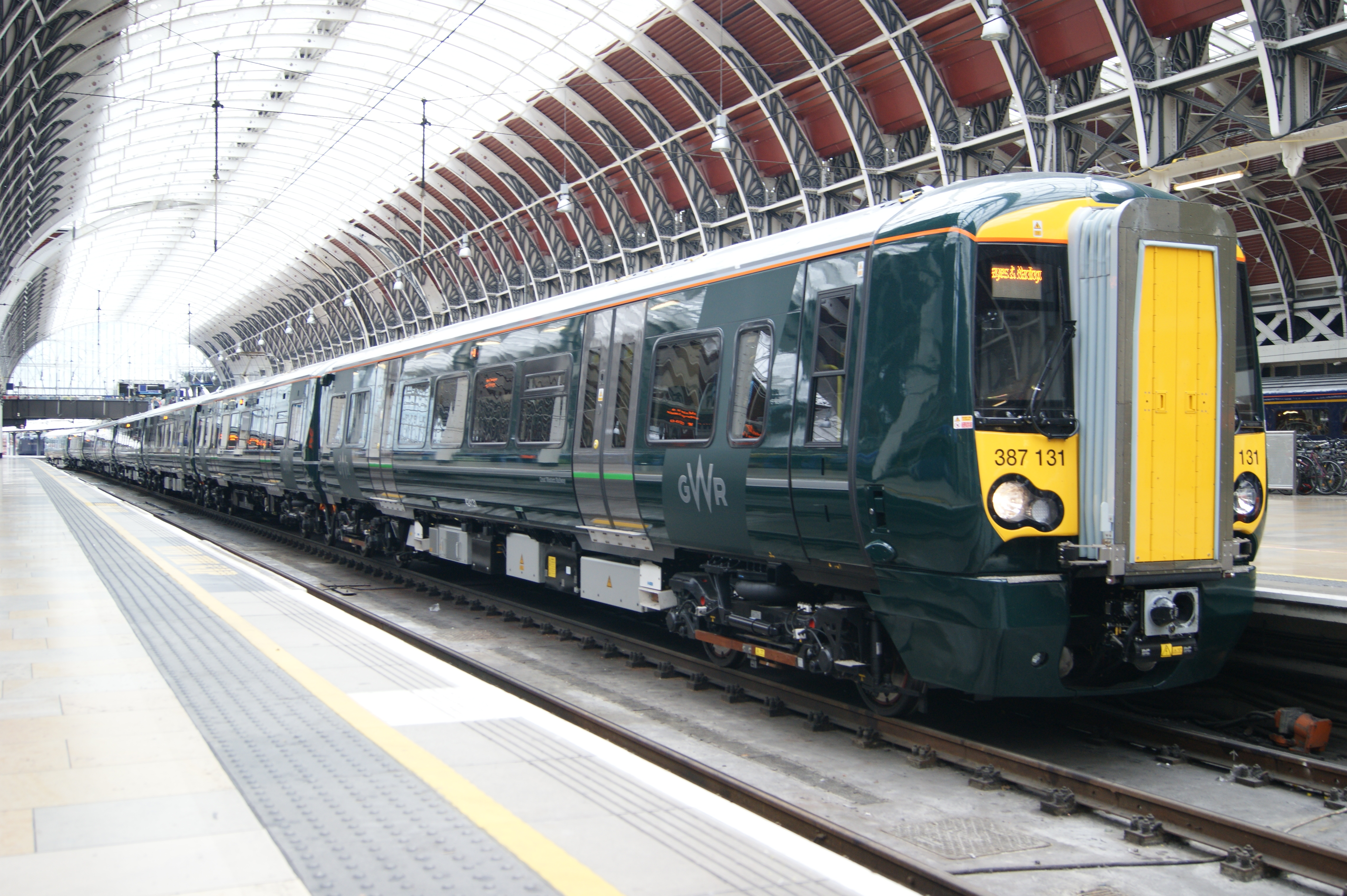
Great Western Railway Class 387 EMUs at London Paddington, 2016

From September 2016, Great Western Railway introduced 45 four-car Class 387/1s on peak services between London Paddington and Hayes & Harlington. They replaced the Class 165s and the Class 166s on the Thames Valley services; they now operate between London Paddington and Reading, Didcot Parkway and Newbury. They have also since been introduced on certain services between London Paddington and Cardiff Central.

GWR announced in 2018 that they will modify 12 units to be used on Heathrow Express due to the Class 332s depot closing.

=== Great Northern ===
From late 2016, 29 of the Class 387/1s operating on Thameslink were displaced by the delivery of Class 700 Desiro City units, and were transferred to Great Northern. They operate mostly on the King's Cross-Cambridge-King's Lynn route, though they can also been seen on other services. These units were delivered in the livery of Southern, with green doors and Southern upholstery.

== See also ==
- Bombardier Turbostar
