= Heathrow Junction railway station =

Former railway station in England

Heathrow Junction
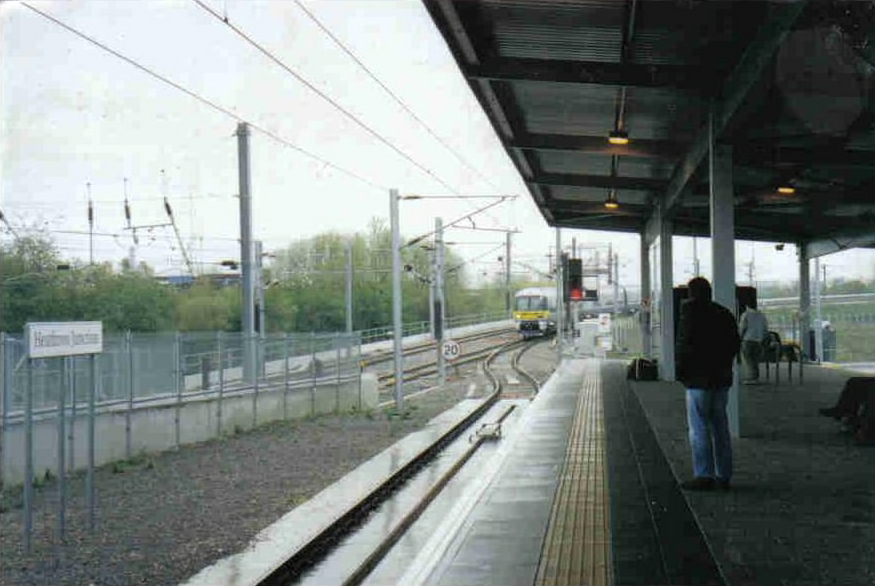
- The station in 1998
- Interactive map of Heathrow Junction

General information
- Location: London Heathrow Airport
- Local authority: London Borough of Hillingdon
- Owner: Heathrow FastTrain
- Number of platforms: 1

Key dates
- 19 January 1998: Opened
- 22 June 1998: Closed
- Replaced by: Heathrow Terminals 2 & 3

Other information
- Coordinates: 51.5033°N 0.4491°W

Heathrow Junction was a short-lived railway station built to serve London Heathrow Airport in the United Kingdom.

== History ==
Between January and June 1998, the Heathrow Express shuttle service was built to connect Paddington station to Heathrow Airport. A new spur was built from the existing Great Western Main Line to the airport, running mostly in tunnel. To save costs, the tunnel was built using the New Austrian Tunnelling Method (NATM). In 1994, parts of the unopened tunnels near the airport collapsed. The collapse not only delayed the finishing of the railway tunnel beneath the airport but also caused the temporary suspension of Piccadilly line services to the airport whilst the ground was stabilised.

With the project delayed, a decision was made to open a temporary surface-level station at the edge of the airport whilst construction continued. The line to the new station followed the route of a long-disused canal known as "Broad's Dock". Heathrow Junction station was situated in Stockley Park, slightly to the north of the airport. Class 332 trains (branded as "Heathrow Fast Train") carried passengers from Paddington to Heathrow Junction (a journey of 12 minutes), and a fleet of shuttle buses carried the passengers the remaining distance to the airport.

On 23 June 1998, after only 126 days, Heathrow Express services commenced to Heathrow Terminals 2 & 3 railway station and Heathrow Terminal 4 railway station. Trains no longer called at Heathrow Junction, and within ten days the track leading to the station had been dismantled.

Preceding station	National Rail	Following station
Disused railways
London Paddington	Heathrow Express	Terminus
