= Terrestrial plant =

Plant that lives on land

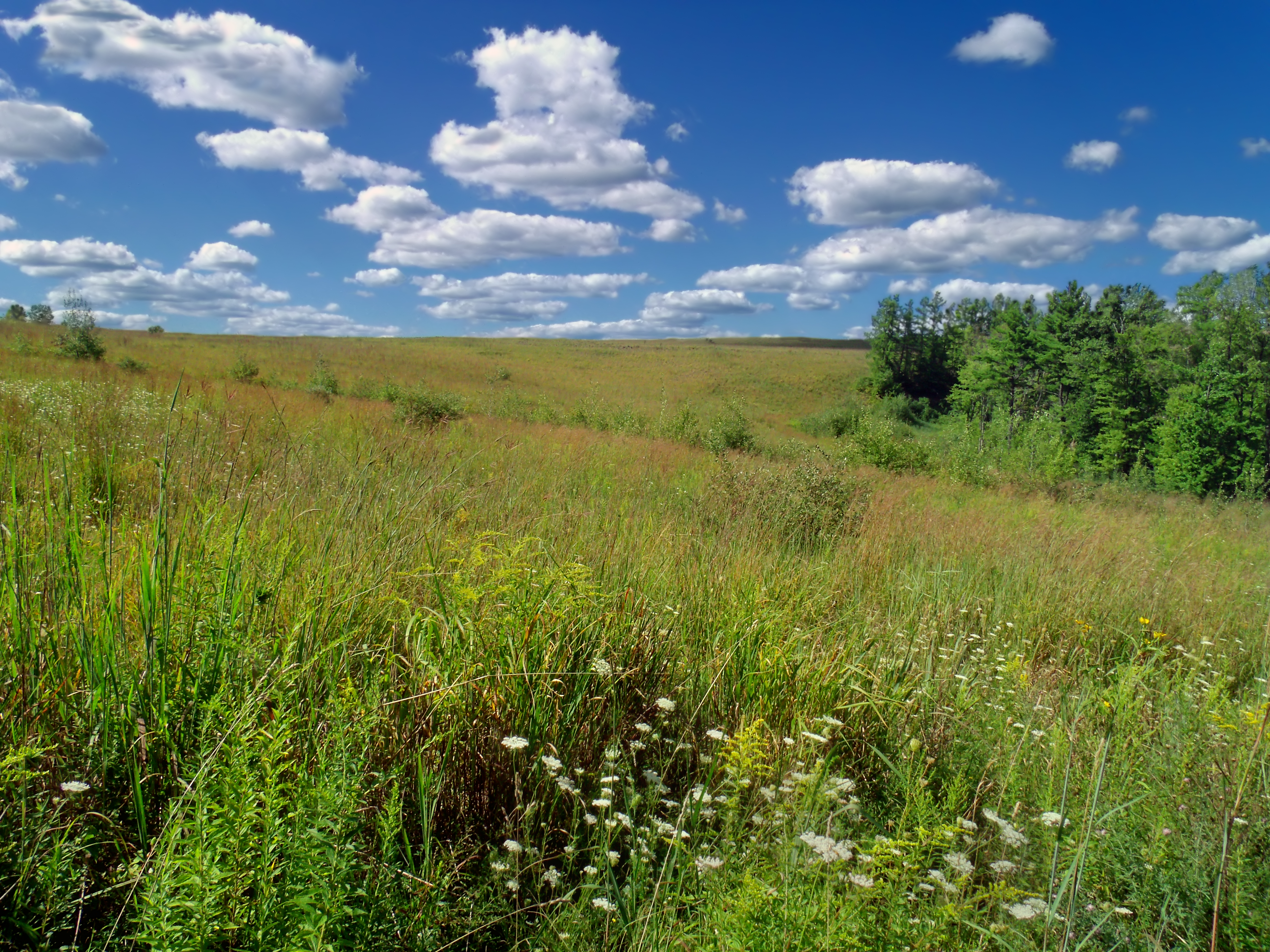
Terrestrial plants on State Game Land 100 in Centre County, Pennsylvania

A terrestrial plant is a plant that grows on, in or from land. Other types of plants are aquatic (living in or on water), semiaquatic (living at edge or seasonally in water), epiphytic (living on other plants), and lithophytic (living in or on rocks).

The distinction between aquatic and terrestrial plants is often blurred because many terrestrial plants are able to tolerate periodic submersion and many aquatic species have both submersed and emersed forms. There are relatively few obligate submersed aquatic plants (species that cannot tolerate emersion for even relatively short periods), but some examples include members of Hydrocharitaceae and Cabombaceae, Ceratophyllum, and Aldrovanda, and most macroalgae (e.g. Chara and Nitella). Most aquatic plants can, or prefer to, grow in the emersed form, and most only flower in that form. Many terrestrial plants can tolerate extended periods of inundation, and this is often part of the natural habitat of the plant where flooding is common. These plants (termed helophytes) tolerate extended periods of waterlogging around the roots and even complete submersion under flood waters. Growth rates of helophytes decrease significantly during these periods of complete submersion and if water levels do not recede the plant will ultimately decline and perish.

== See also ==
- Aquatic animal
- Aquatic ecosystem
- Aquatic locomotion
- Aquatic mammal
- Aquatic plant
- Botany
- Plant community
- Raunkiær plant life-form
- Terrestrial animal
- Terrestrial
- Terrestrial ecosystem
- Terrestrial locomotion
- Wetland – Type of land area that is flooded or saturated with water
- Wetland indicator status
