= British Rail Class 387 =

Class of British 'Electrostar' electric multiple units

British Rail Class 387 Electrostar
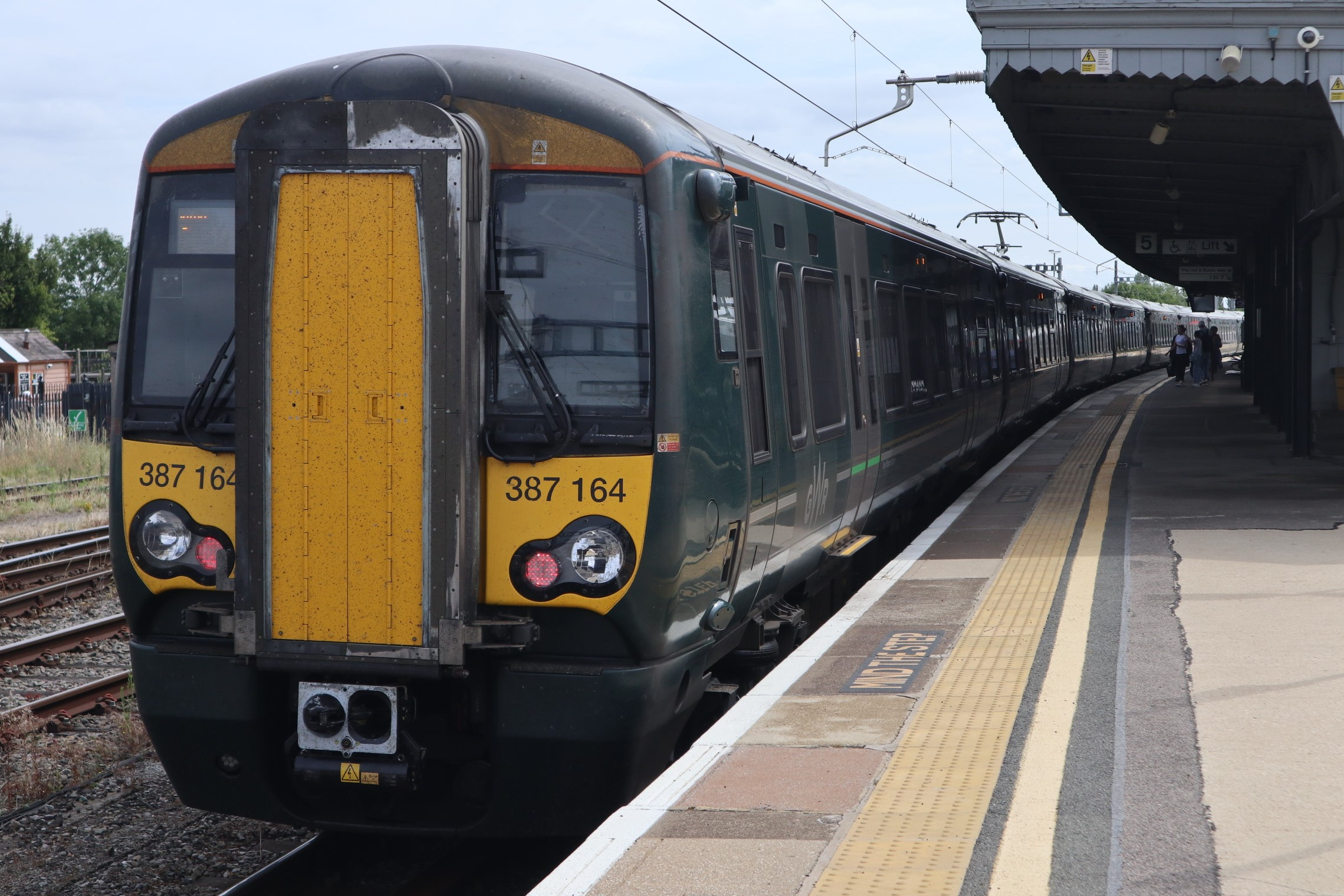
- Great Western Railway Class 387 unit at Didcot Parkway

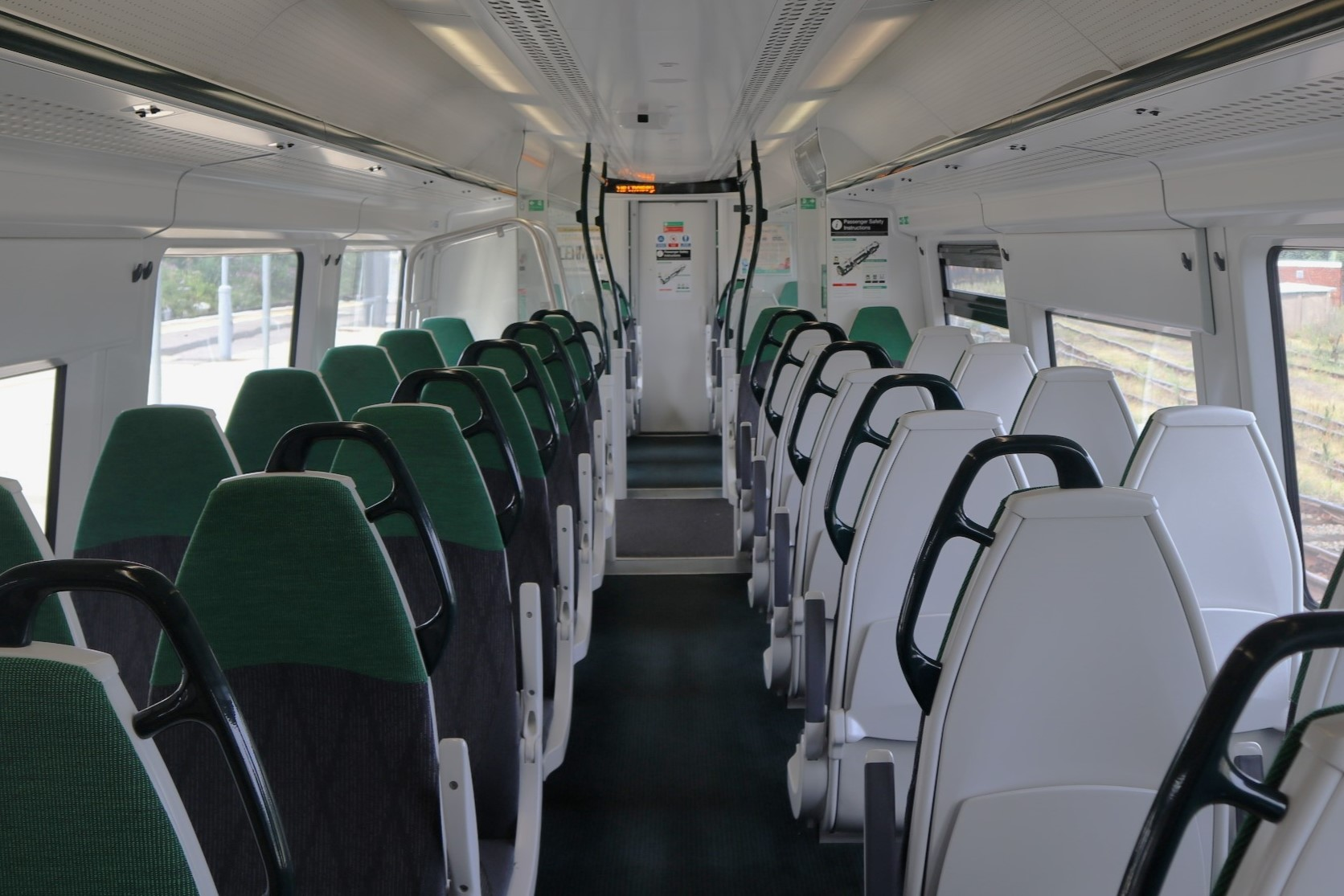
- The interior of a GWR Class 387 unit
- In service: 8 December 2014 – present
- Manufacturer: Bombardier Transportation
- Built at: Derby Litchurch Lane Works
- Family name: Electrostar
- Replaced: Class 317 (Great Northern); Class 321 (Great Northern); Class 332 (Heathrow Express); Class 365 (Great Northern); Class 442 (Gatwick Express)
- Number built: 107
- Successor: Class 379 (Great Northern); Class 700 (Thameslink); Class 720 (c2c)
- Formation: 4 cars per unit: DMSO-MSO-PTSO-DMSO
- Operators: Current: Gatwick Express; Great Northern; Great Western Railway; Heathrow Express; Southern; Former: Thameslink; c2c

Specifications
- Car length: 20.39 metres (66 ft 11 in)
- Width: 2.80 metres (9 ft 2 in)
- Height: 3.77 metres (12 ft 4 in)
- Maximum speed: 110 mph (177 km/h)
- Traction system: IGBT-VVVF (Bombardier MITRAC DR1000)
- Power output: 1.68 MW (2,250 hp)
- Electric systems: 25 kV 50 Hz AC overhead; 750 V DC third rail
- Current collection: Pantograph (AC); Contact shoe (DC)
- UIC classification: 2′Bo′+2′Bo′+2′2′+Bo′2′
- Safety systems: AWS; TPWS; ETCS (HX & GN units only)
- Track gauge: 1,435 mm (4 ft 8 1/2 in) standard gauge

The British Rail Class 387 Electrostar is a type of electric multiple unit passenger train built by Bombardier Transportation. They are part of the Electrostar family of trains. A total of 107 units were built, with the first train entering service with Thameslink in December 2014. The trains are currently in service with Gatwick Express, Great Northern, Great Western Railway, Heathrow Express and Southern. The Class 387 is a variation of the Class 379 with dual-voltage capability which allows units to run on 750 V DC third rail, as well as use 25 kV AC OLE. The class were the final rolling stock orders from the Bombardier Electrostar family with 2,805 vehicles built over 18 years between 1999 and 2017.

== Description ==
=== Class 387/1 ===
The first Class 387/1s were ordered for the Thameslink route, which enabled the existing Class 319 units to be transferred to Northern Rail for use on the newly electrified Manchester Victoria to Liverpool via Newton-le-Willows route.

On behalf of the Department for Transport, Southern issued an OJEU notice in December 2012, with proposals received in January 2013. The invitation to tender for the fleet was released the following month with final offers being submitted by 18 June 2013. Southern announced it had signed a deal with Bombardier on 30 July 2013 for 29 four-carriage units.

In October 2015, Porterbrook placed a speculative order for 80 carriages. Fifty-six were later leased to Great Western Railway and the remaining 24 to c2c as 387/3s.

The Class 387/1 fleet is subdivided into a Class 387/1a fleet which has been fitted with the ETCS signalling system for use in the Heathrow Airport railway tunnels. This subfleet was authorised for use in passenger service under ETCS by the ORR on 14 December 2020.

=== Class 387/2 ===
Govia ordered 27 four-carriage units to replace Class 442 units on the Gatwick Express service. The first units entered service in February 2016.

=== Class 387/3 ===
In May 2016, c2c announced that it would operate six Class 387 units to add capacity to its network.

== Current operations ==
=== Gatwick Express ===
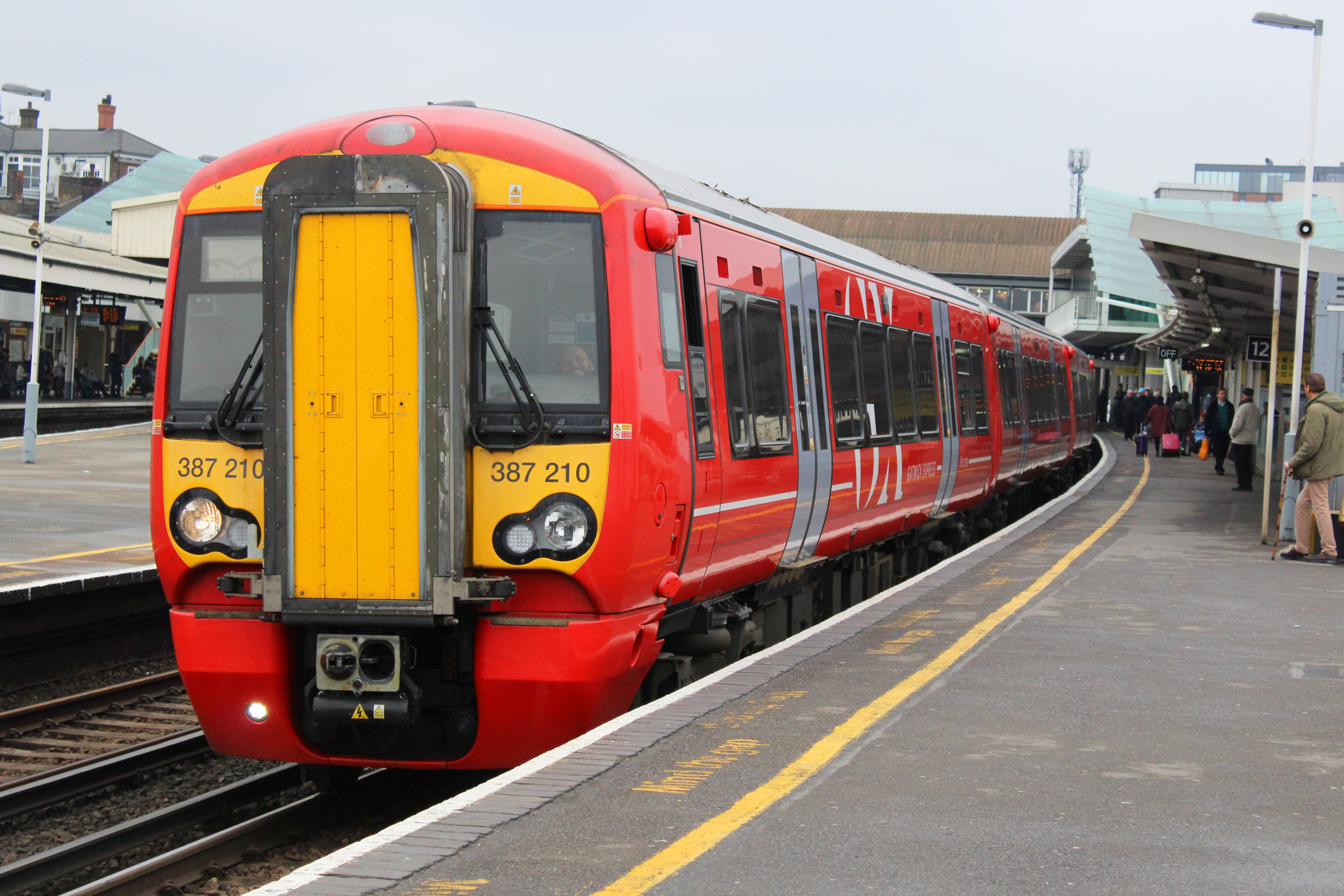
Gatwick Express Class 387

As part of Govia's bid for the Thameslink, Southern and Great Northern franchise, 27 four-carriage units were ordered to replace Class 442 units on the Gatwick Express service, using some of the optional 140 extra carriages. The order was announced in November 2014 with the first units on test in July 2015 and they began to enter service on 29 February 2016.

The deployment was disrupted by unionised drivers refusing to take passengers, claiming that the twelve-coach Class 387 trains are not covered by their driver only operation agreement which is limited to ten coaches, and that running them without a conductor would be unsafe. In response to this, Govia applied to the high court to seek an injunction to enable to trains to enter service, and the union ultimately dropped the claim. Prior to entering service with Gatwick Express, several units entered service with Thameslink in response to delays with commissioning the Class 700 units. These then returned to Gatwick Express by the end of summer 2016.

In 2021, six units were transferred to Great Northern to cover for the withdrawal of the Class 365, with another six being sub-leased to Great Western Railway.

=== Southern ===
As part of the introduction of the Class 379 EMUs onto the Great Northern services, some class 387/1 and 387/3 units moved to Southern operating on some Coastway and mainline services, these are also replacing Class 377 EMUs which in turn are being subleased to South Eastern. The 387/2s which were leased by Great Northern were transferred over to Southern, which then returned them to Gatwick Express.

On 21 May 2026, Southern unit 387172 was revealed wearing the new Great British Railways livery, prior to the renationalisation of Southern on 31 May 2026, and the transfer of Govia's services to Greater Thameslink Railway.

=== Great Western Railway ===
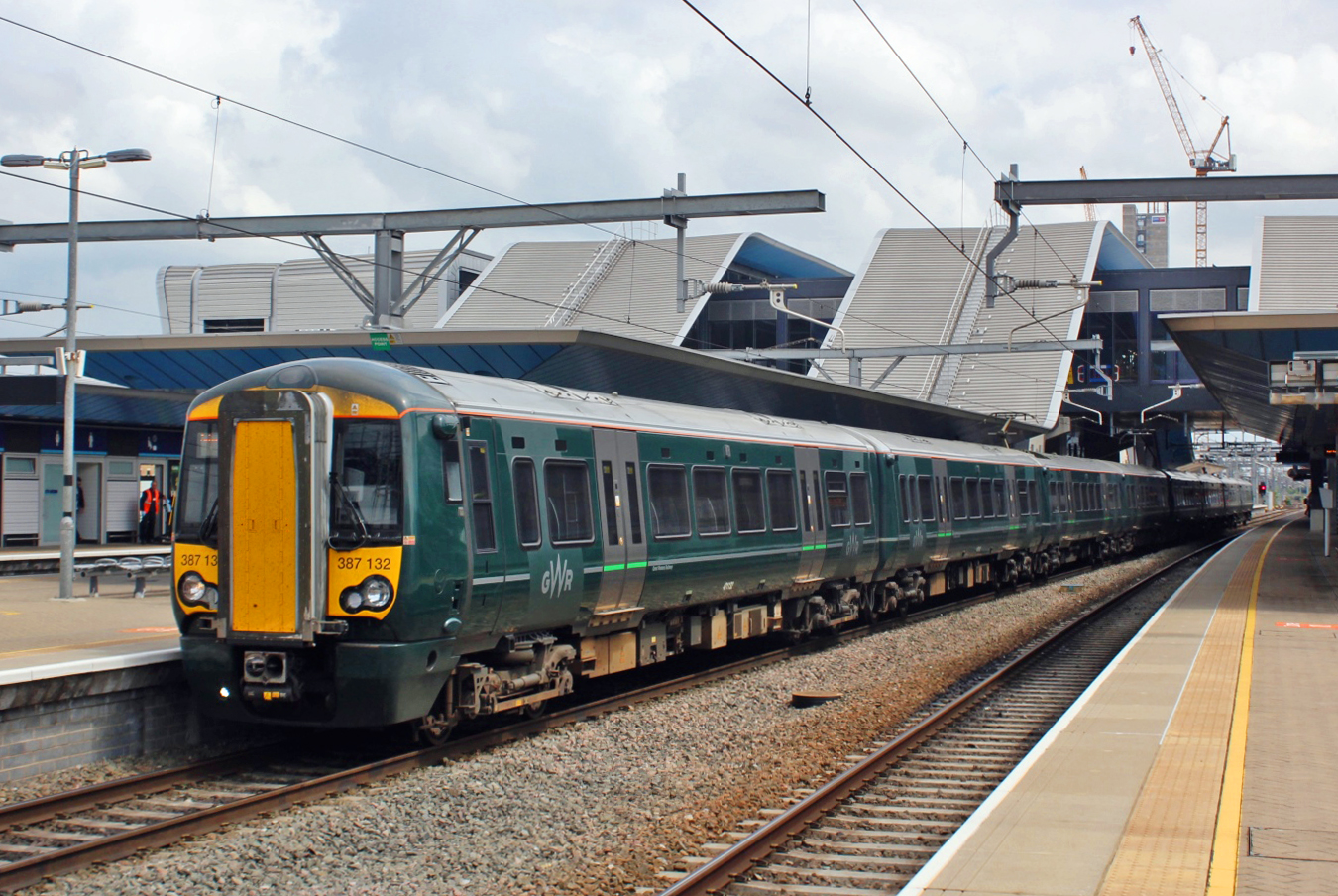
Great Western Railway Class 387 at Reading

The first Great Western Railway unit entered service on 5 September 2016 running between London Paddington and Hayes & Harlington in peak hours to relieve congestion on some of the country's most crowded trains. In January 2017 GWR began running a half-hourly Paddington to Hayes & Harlington service using pairs of these 387/1s.

On 1 January 2018, following further electrification work, Class 387/1 EMUs began operating suburban services between London Paddington and Didcot Parkway, replacing GWR Class 165 DMUs on these services. Due to electrification being suspended from Didcot Parkway to Oxford, the previous Oxford suburban service from London Paddington was cut back to Didcot Parkway to allow electric trains to operate this service and a separate service run by class 165s runs between Didcot Parkway and Oxford. Oxford is still served by the fast services from London Paddington.

In January 2019, Class 387/1 EMUs began operating between Reading and Newbury after electrification works on the Reading–Taunton line were completed. In December 2019, Class 345s took over most of the GWR stopping services between Reading and Paddington. This displaced 12 Class 387s which are now used on Heathrow Express services between Heathrow Terminal 5 and Paddington.

Since the December 2021 timetable change, GWR use Class 387s on daily services on the full length of the electrified sections of the Great Western Main Line and the South Wales Main Line from Paddington to Cardiff, as well as on special services when events are held at the Millennium Stadium.

=== Great Northern ===
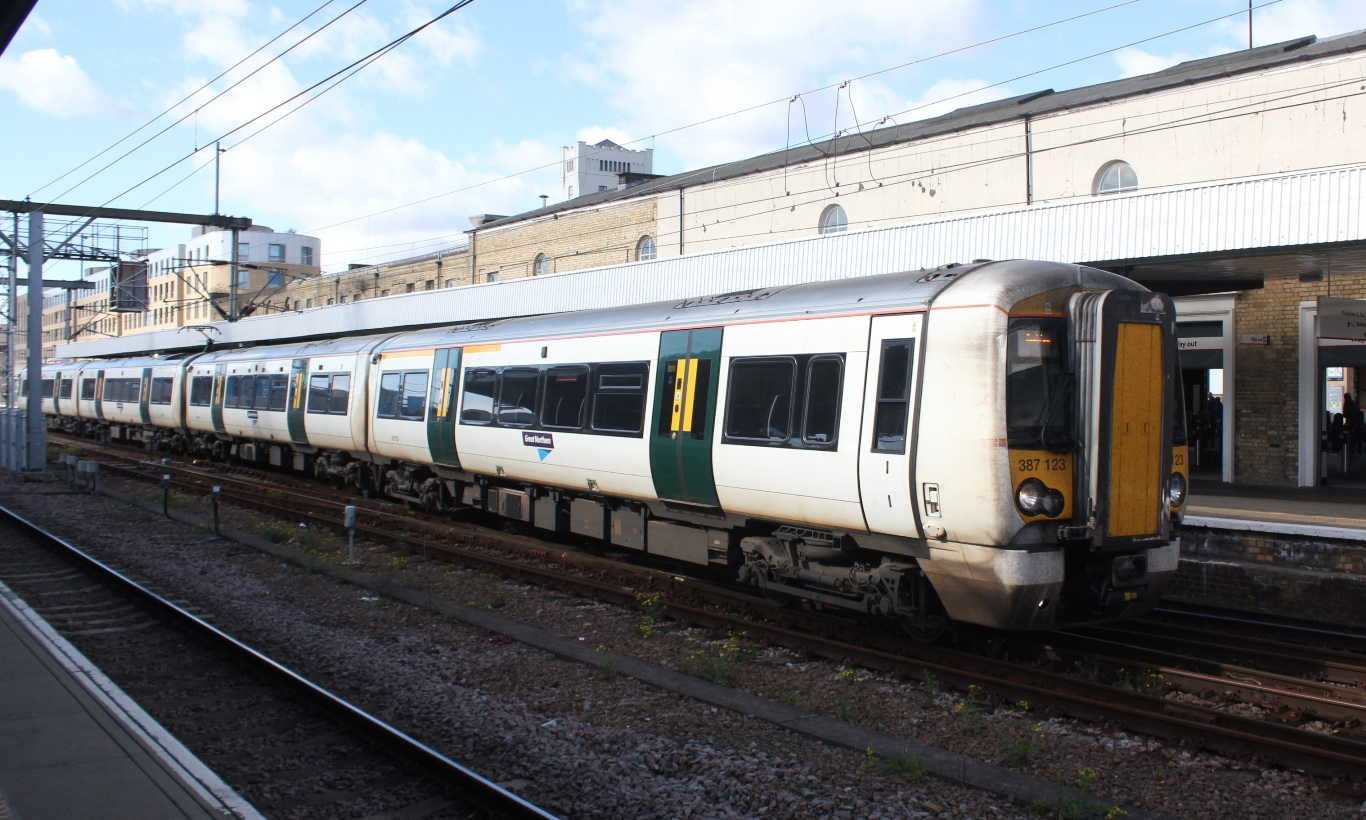
Great Northern Class 387 at Cambridge

From late 2016, 29 of the Class 387/1s operating on Thameslink were displaced by the delivery of Class 700s, and were transferred to Great Northern. They operate mostly on the Kings Cross–Cambridge–King's Lynn route, though they can also be seen on other services. These units were delivered in a white livery, with Southern green doors and Southern moquette.

In 2018, 387105 was transferred to Gatwick Express services, but was not re-liveried into Gatwick Express red. It was transferred back to Great Northern in May 2020, regaining its original branding.

In March 2021, it was announced that Great Northern would be withdrawing the remaining Class 365s from service in May 2021, with ex Gatwick Express Class 387/2s used to replace them.

In mid-July 2022, it received the 6 displaced Class 387/3 from c2c, to allow for some Class 387/2s to be sent back to Southern.

=== Heathrow Express ===
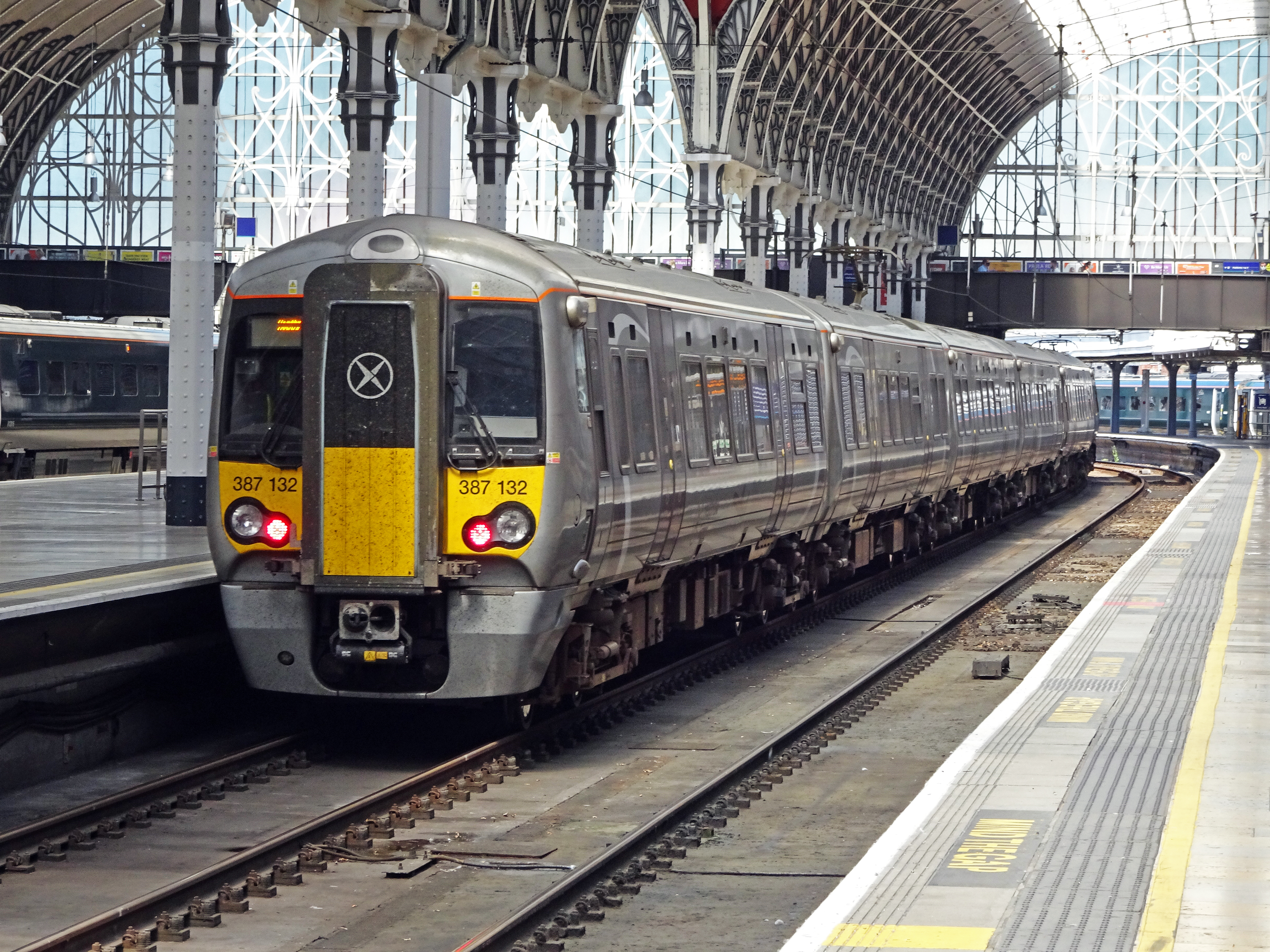
Heathrow Express Class 387 at London Paddington

In March 2018, Heathrow Airport Holdings came to an agreement with Great Western Railway to take over the operation of the Heathrow Express service between London Paddington and Heathrow Airport from August 2018. In September 2019, Heathrow Express confirmed that operation of the service would pass to GWR with ownership remaining with Heathrow Airport Holdings until at least 2028. GWR would provide and maintain the Class 387 units for the service from 2020, with the Class 332 trains withdrawn from service.

Twelve Class 387 units from the GWR fleet were modified to provide a dedicated set of trains for the service including first class accommodation, high speed Wi-Fi, additional luggage racks and on-board entertainment. The Heathrow Express sub-fleet is designated as Class 387/1a due to their unique fitment of the ETCS signalling system for use in the Heathrow Airport railway tunnels.

The first units entered revenue earning service with Heathrow Express on 29 December 2020.

== Former operations ==
=== c2c ===
A former c2c Class 387/3 at Newbury. This train now operates with Great Northern.

In 2014, the Essex Thameside franchise was awarded to the incumbent operator, National Express (operating as c2c). National Express agreed to order new trains to increase capacity, as the line was suffering with overcrowding.

The first c2c Class 387/3 was delivered in October 2016 and entered service on 14 November 2016. These trains were built primarily as stock units; they were leased out to c2c from Porterbrook.

The units operated fast limited stop services from Shoeburyness to London Fenchurch Street as 12 car sets during peak hours; following the impacts of the COVID-19 pandemic, the units were temporarily stored at Shoeburyness Carriage Sidings in March 2020. Later in 2020, they were reinstated for use on services in the c2c network, again working peak hour limited stop services between Fenchurch Street and Shoeburyness.

In May 2021, c2c transferred three units to Great Western Railway owing to their fleet of Class 800s requiring repairs due to bogie defects.

c2c and Great Western Railway withdrew their 387/3 fleets in June 2022. They transferred to Great Northern in mid-July 2022 and have now received Great Northern branding.

=== Thameslink ===
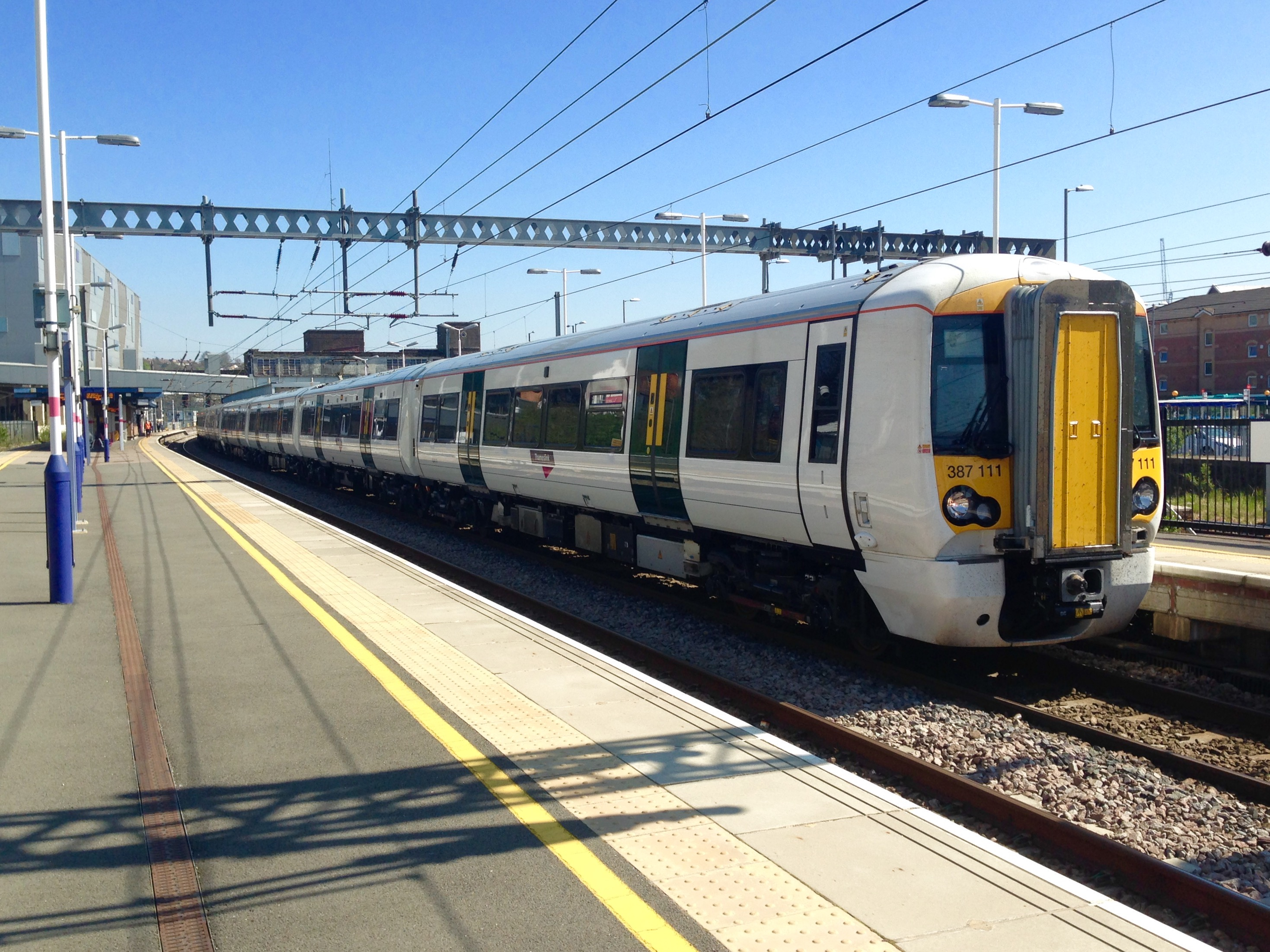
Class 387 in Thameslink livery, now operating Great Northern services

The first Thameslink unit entered service in December 2014 with all in service by July 2015. They were operated by Thameslink on services between Bedford and Brighton.

During Summer 2016, several of Gatwick Express Class 387/2 units entered service with Thameslink prior to introduction on Gatwick Express services due to the delay of the Class 700 units, although these returned to service with Gatwick Express after a few months.

The Class 387/1s have since been transferred to Great Northern working services from Kings Cross to King's Lynn via Cambridge, as well as peak time and weekend services to Peterborough.

== Accidents ==
- On 15 August 2017, unit 387117 collided with the buffer stops on platform 9 at London King's Cross station.
- On 27 November 2018, unit 387146 derailed near West Ealing railway station.
- On 13 August 2026, unit 387304 coupled with 387172 derailed near Lewes.

== Fleet details ==
=== Units ===
Class	Operator	Number built	Year built	Cars per unit	Unit numbers
387/1	Great Northern	22	2014–2017 (Note: 387101-387129 built 2014-2015; 387130-387174 built 2016-2017)	4	387101–387118, 387120, 387122, 387127, 387172
387/1	Heathrow Express	12	2014–2017	4	387130–387141
387/1	Great Western Railway	30	2014–2017	4	387142–387171
387/1	Southern	8	2014–2017	4	387119, 387121, 387123, 387126, 387128-387129, 387173-387174
387/2	Gatwick Express	22	2015–2016	4	387202–387204, 387209–387227
387/2	Southern	5	2015–2016	4	387201, 387205–387208
387/3	Great Northern	1	2016	4	387304
387/3	Southern	5	2016	4	387301-387303, 387305-387306

=== Liveries ===
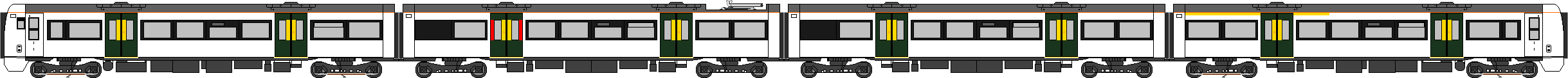
Illustration of a Great Northern and Southern Class 387/1 unit
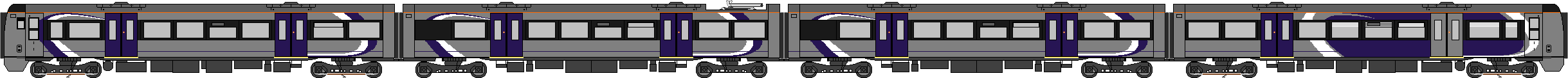
Illustration of a Heathrow Express Class 387/1 unit
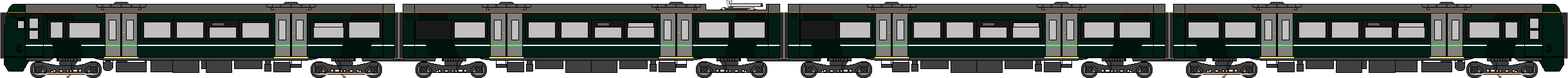
Illustration of a Great Western Railway Class 387/1 unit
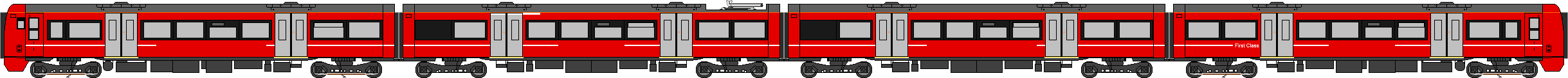
Illustration of a Gatwick Express Class 387/2 unit
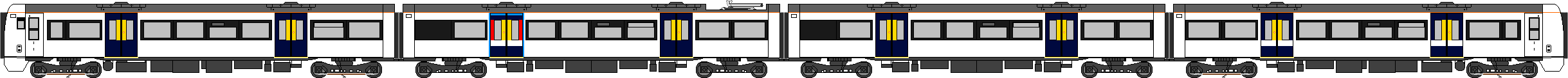
Illustration of a Great Northern and Southern Class 387/3 unit

== Named units ==
The following units have received names:

- 387124 Paul Mccann
- 387130 San Francisco
- 387131 Sydney
- 387132 New York
- 387133 Tokyo
- 387134 Barcelona
- 387135 Rome
- 387136 Paris
- 387137 Amsterdam
- 387138 Las Vegas
- 387139 Dublin
- 387140 London
- 387141 Prague
