= Extraterrestrial =

Extraterrestrial may refer to:

== Science ==
- Extraterrestrial life, life that occurs outside of Earth and that probably did not originate from Earth

== Media ==
- Extraterrestrial (TV program), a 2005 television series broadcast on National Geographic Channel, also known as Alien Worlds in the UK
- Extraterrestrial: The First Sign of Intelligent Life Beyond Earth, 2021 popular science book by Avi Loeb
- Extraterrestrial (2011 film), a 2011 Spanish film by Nacho Vigalondo
- Extraterrestrial (2014 film), a 2014 American film by Colin Minihan and written by The Vicious Brothers
- E.T. the Extra-Terrestrial, a 1982 film by Steven Spielberg
- Extraterrestrials in fiction

== Music ==
- "Extraterrestrial" (Tynan and Kompany song), 2018
- Extraterrestrial (Joker Xue song), 2020
- Extraterrestrial (album), a 2020 album by Joker Xue
- Extraterrestrial World Tour by Joker Xue, 2021-2025

== See also ==
- ET (disambiguation)
- Alien (disambiguation)
- Extraterritorial
- Starman (disambiguation)
- Spaceman (disambiguation)
- Terrestrial (disambiguation)
- Offworld (disambiguation)
- Outer space
