= Hezhou (disambiguation) =

Hezhou (贺州) is a prefecture-level city and former prefecture in Guangxi, China.

Hezhou may also refer to the followings:

== Places ==
- Hezhou (Anhui) (和州), a prefecture between the 6th and 20th centuries in modern Anhui
- Hezhou (Chongqing) (合州), a prefecture between the 6th and 20th centuries in modern Chongqing and Sichuan
- Hezhou (Gansu) (河州), modern Linxia City
- Hezhou, Hunan (河洲), a town in Qidong County, Hunan

== Others ==
- Hezhou language

== See also ==
- He (disambiguation)
