= Terrestrial =

Terrestrial refers to things related to land or the planet Earth, as opposed to extraterrestrial.

Terrestrial may also refer to:

- Terrestrial animal, an animal that lives on land opposed to living in water, or sometimes an animal that lives on or near the ground, as opposed to arboreal life (in trees)
  - A fishing fly that simulates the appearance of a land insect is referred to as a terrestrial fly.
- Terrestrial ecoregion, land ecoregions, as distinct from freshwater ecoregions and marine ecoregions
- Terrestrial ecosystem, an ecosystem found only on landforms
- Terrestrial gamma-ray flash, a burst of gamma rays produced in Earth's atmosphere
- Terrestrial locomotion, evolutionary adaptation from aquatic types of locomotion
- Terrestrial plant, a plant that grows on land rather than in water or on rocks or trees
- Terrestrial planet, a planet that is primarily composed of silicate rocks, and thus "Earth-like"
- Terrestrial radio, radio signals received through a conventional aerial, as opposed to satellite radio
- Terrestrial radiation, due to the insolation of heat by the earth surface, earth re-radiates the heat to the atmosphere in the form of long waves
- Terrestrial reconnaissance, a type of reconnaissance that is employed along the elements of ground warfare
- Terrestrial reference frame, the reference frame as one views from earth
- Terrestrial television, television signals received through a conventional aerial, as opposed to satellite television or cable television
- Terrestrial Time, an astronomical time standard
- Terrestrial Trunked Radio, a specialist walkie talkie standard used by police departments, fire departments, ambulance services and the military
- Cretaceous Terrestrial Revolution, the intense diversification of land animals
- Earthly, as worldly and opposite to otherworldly

== Art and entertainment ==
- Terrestrial (film), a 2025 American science fiction film by Steve Pink
- Terrestrials, a 2002 album by Atrox
- Terrestrials (Sunn O))) and Ulver album), a 2014 collaborative album by Sunn O))) and Ulver
- Terrestrials (Pond album), a 2026 album by Pond

== See also ==
- Extraterrestrial (disambiguation)
- Terrestre (disambiguation)
- Terrestris
- Degrees of glory#Terrestrial kingdom
