= Terrestre =

Terrestre may refer to:

- Terrestre (band), a Mexican band
- Terrestre (album), 2005 album by the Italian rock band Subsonica
- terrestre or terrestris, a Latin term meaning "terrestrial" used in systematic names for biological species

== See also ==
- Terrestrial (disambiguation)
