= Economic Times =

Economic Times may refer to:

- Hong Kong Economic Times (est. 1988), a Chinese-language financial newspaper
- The Economic Times (est. 1961), an Indian English-language financial newspaper
