= Heathrow Express =

Airport rail link in London, England

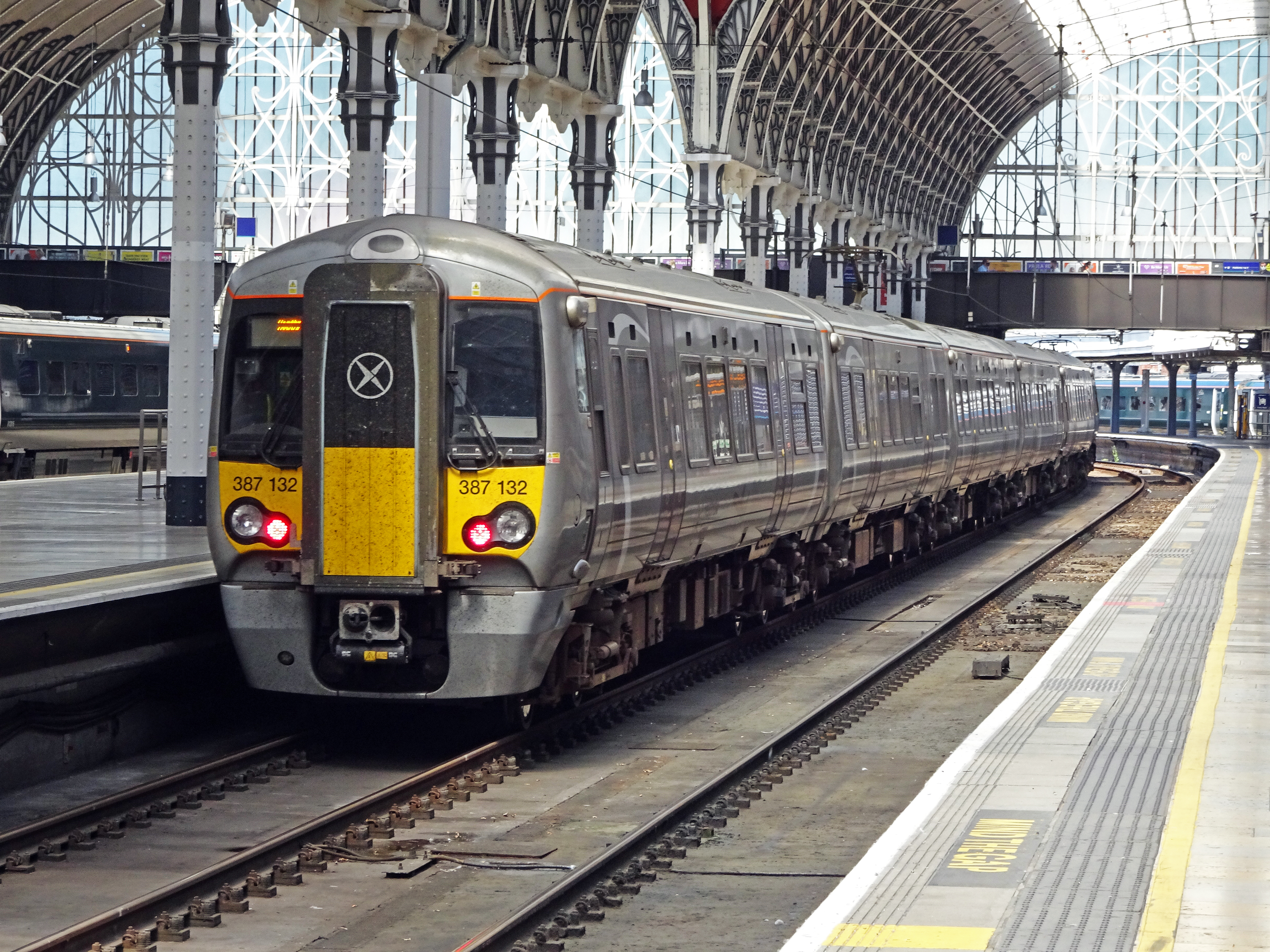
- A Heathrow Express Class 387 at London Paddington

Overview
- Franchises: Open access operator Not subject to franchising 23 June 1998 – 2028
- Main route: London Paddington – Heathrow Airport
- Fleet: Class 387
- Stations called at: 3
- Parent company: Heathrow Airport Holdings
- Reporting mark: HX

Technical
- Length: 26.285 km (16.333 mi)

Other
- Website: www.heathrowexpress.com

Heathrow Express is a high-frequency airport rail link operating between London Heathrow Airport and London Paddington. Opened in 1998, trains run non-stop, with a journey time of 15 minutes. The service is operated jointly by Great Western Railway and Heathrow Express Operating Company, a wholly owned subsidiary of Heathrow Airport Holdings. Around 16,000 passengers use the service each day.

== History ==
=== Background ===
Heathrow Airport, the main international airport serving London, was connected to the London Underground network in the late 1970s. However the journey to central London on the Piccadilly line takes around 40 to 50 minutes, the same time as a black taxi. In the early 1980s, the quality of public transport to the airport was criticised at public inquiries regarding expansion of the airport, with the inspector noting that "a direct and dedicated ... rail link should be provided".

During 1986, the Heathrow Surface Access Study recommended a non-stop airport rail link between London and Heathrow Airport. In July 1988, Secretary of State for Transport Paul Channon approved a joint venture between the British Airports Authority (BAA) and British Rail to work on the project, with an opening date of 1993.

In November 1988, a Parliamentary bill was introduced, seeking approval to build the project. The Heathrow Express Railway Act received royal assent in May 1991. In March 1993, government expenditure for the project was approved in the spring budget. BAA would fund 80% of the cost, with British Rail contributing 20%. In August 1993, British Rail and BAA signed the contract to build the line, with an opening date of December 1997. Following the privatisation of British Rail from November 1993, the project was taken over by BAA in 1996.

=== Construction ===
Construction began in 1993, with an estimated cost of £350 million. The principal works were two 6.8 km (4.2 miles) single-bore tunnels (including eight escape shafts) and underground stations at Heathrow Central and Terminal 4. Electrification of the Great Western Main Line (GWML) between Paddington and Airport Junction, where the new line diverged from the GWML, was also required to achieve a 15-minute journey time. A flying junction known as the Stockley Flyover was constructed to connect the tunnel to the GWML fast lines. As part of the construction of the project, steps were taken to reduce the environmental and visual impact of the railway, including disguising ventilation shafts as barns.

In October 1994, a tunnel collapse occurred during construction that led to the subsidence of a surface building and three large surface craters. The investigation into the collapse led to a six-month delay in opening and additional costs of around £150 million. Tunnelling contractor Balfour Beatty and designer Geoconsult were subsequently fined a total of £1.7M – a then record for offences under health and safety legislation.

=== Opening ===
Beginning in January 1998, an interim service called Heathrow FastTrain ran to a temporary station called Heathrow Junction, where a coach took passengers the rest of the way. Full service between London Paddington, Heathrow Central and Terminal 4 opened on 23 June 1998, with an opening by Prime Minister Tony Blair. The Heathrow Express brand, as well as staff uniforms, train design and station architecture were designed by Wolff Olins.

From 1999 to 2003, a check-in service was provided at Paddington, allowing Heathrow Express passengers to check in and drop off their luggage prior to flights, which was similar to the service currently provided on Hong Kong's Airport Express. Checked baggage was transported to the airport by using the luggage space in the westbound first carriage. This service was withdrawn due to low usage and high cost of operation.

In the late 1990s, BAA proposed an extension of the line to St Pancras, proposing use of the Dudding Hill line to access the Midland Main Line to access St Pancras. Railtrack proposed a stopping service from Heathrow to St Pancras, by using London Underground tracks. This was part of Railtrack's bid to win the public-private partnership (PPP) contract to upgrade and maintain the sub-surface lines of the Underground. Neither proposal took place, following Railtrack's financial issues in the early 2000s.

In March 2008, the service was extended to the Heathrow Terminal 5 station with the opening of the new Terminal 5. In 2010, a dedicated shuttle between Heathrow Central and Terminal 4 was introduced, timed to connect with the main Heathrow Express service to/from Terminal 5 to improve connections between the terminals.

During 2009, flight information display screens were introduced at London Paddington. In 2017, Heathrow Express announced that over 100 million passengers had used the service since opening in 1998.

In March 2018, the Department for Transport and Heathrow Airport Holdings announced that the contract allowing Heathrow Express to operate had been extended to 2028. During August 2018, Great Western Railway (GWR) took over the operation of Heathrow Express as part of a new management contract. Heathrow Airport continues to be responsible for commercial aspects of the service, including marketing, ticket pricing and revenue management, while GWR are now responsible for operations. In December 2020, new trains were introduced, replacing the trains used since the service began in 1998.

=== Heathrow Connect to Elizabeth line ===
In June 2005, Heathrow Express began jointly providing a new Heathrow Connect service, which saw a new twice-hourly stopping service on the same route between Paddington and Heathrow using Class 360 EMUs from the Siemens Desiro family. Heathrow Airport Holdings had provided the on-board staff through Heathrow Express as part of the contract. This continued until May 2018, when Heathrow Connect was absorbed into TfL Rail ahead of the new Crossrail project. In May 2022, TfL Rail services were rebranded as the Elizabeth line, with through trains running through central London from November 2022. Heathrow Express services continue to terminate at London Paddington.

== Service ==
Route	tph	Intermediate stops
London Paddington – Heathrow Terminal 5	4	Heathrow Terminals 2 & 3

Trains depart Paddington every 15 minutes from 05:10 (06:10 on Sunday) until 23:25, and there is a similar quarter-hourly service in the return direction. At Paddington they use dedicated platforms 6 and 7, although on occasions other platforms are used. There are two stops at Heathrow: Heathrow Terminals 2 & 3 (journey time from Paddington 15 minutes) and Heathrow Terminal 5 (journey time 21 minutes), platforms 3 and 4. Passengers travelling between terminals can do so for free, with passengers for Heathrow Terminal 4 having to change to an Elizabeth line train at Heathrow Terminals 2 & 3 station.

=== On board ===
Trains offer a choice of two classes of travel: express class which corresponds to standard class, and "business first" class which corresponds to first class. Both classes are fully accessible, with large luggage storage spaces and complimentary Wi-Fi. First class offers wider seats and a table at every seat, as well as 'Fast Track' security at the airport terminals.

Children under 16 travel free of charge with a fare-paying adult; unaccompanied children may travel free of charge in express class only with proof of a same-day flight to or from Heathrow.

== Route ==
The service runs along Network Rail's Great Western Main Line from Paddington to Airport Junction. The line from Airport Junction to the airport terminals is owned by Heathrow Airport Holdings but maintained by Network Rail. The line is electrified at 25 kV AC overhead and uses Automatic Train Protection (ATP) and European Train Control System (ETCS). The controlling signal centre for the entire route is the Thames Valley Signalling Centre (TVSC) in Didcot.

=== Stations ===
Station	Image	Time
London Paddington		Start
Heathrow Terminals 2 & 3		15 minutes
Heathrow Terminal 5		21 minutes

== Rolling stock ==
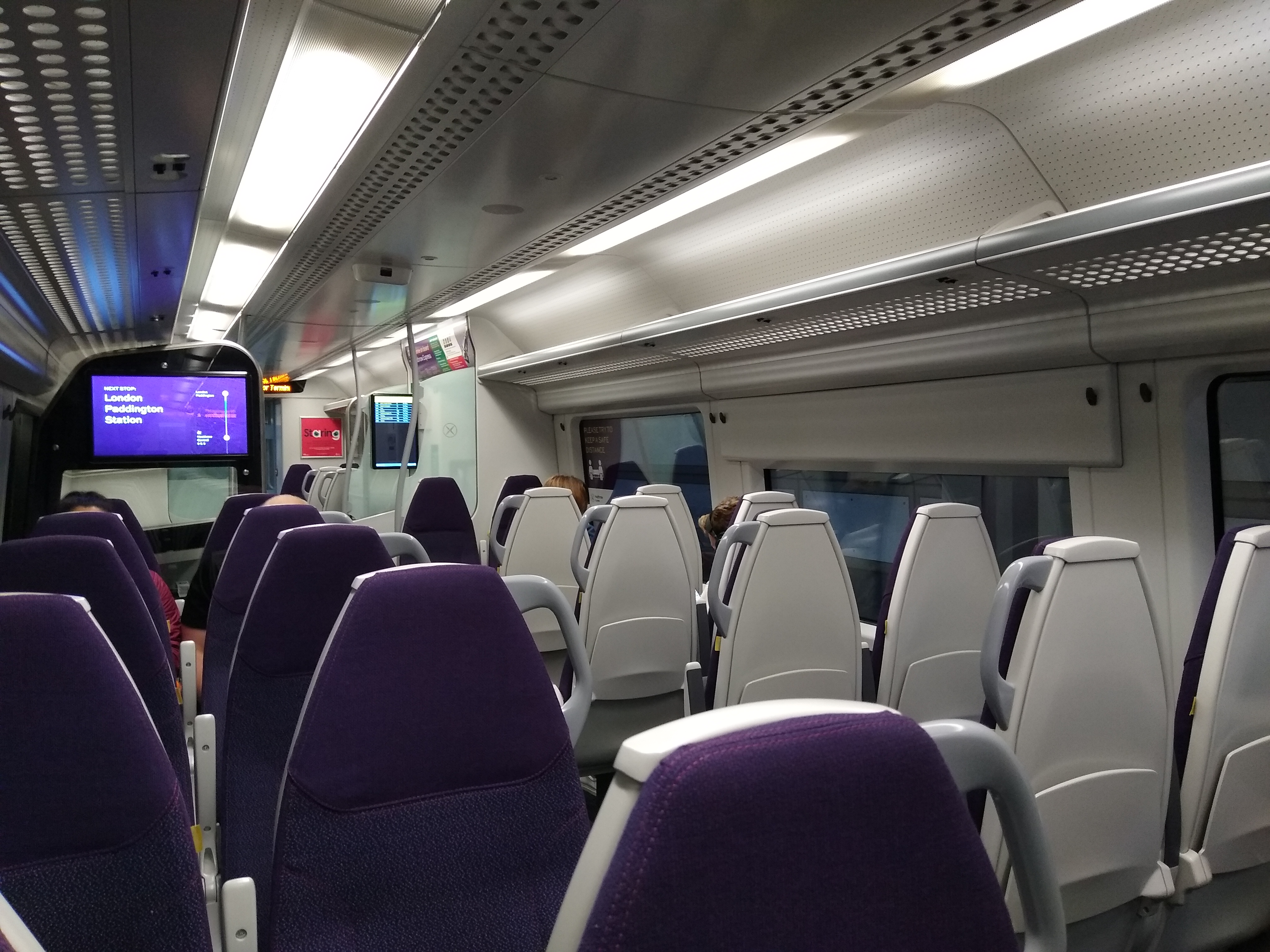
Interior of a Heathrow Express Class 387

=== Current fleet ===
On 29 December 2020, the first of twelve Class 387 units from the Bombardier Electrostar family began service with Heathrow Express, having replaced the Class 332 fleet. The units transferred from Great Western Railway who are also responsible for their maintenance and operation within Heathrow Express. The units underwent modifications prior to their introduction on Heathrow Express which included the fitting of USB power sockets, extra luggage space, work tables, on-board Wi-Fi and HD TVs. A new Business First cabin was also included in a 2+1 configuration with reclining seats.

Class	Image	Type	Top speed		Number	Carriages	Routes	Built
Class	Image	Type	mph	km/h	Number	Carriages	Routes	Built
387 Electrostar		EMU	110	177	12	4	London Paddington – Heathrow Terminal 5	2016–2017

=== Past fleet ===
The initial BAA/BR joint venture initially proposed use of Networker trains, similar to those purchased elsewhere by Network SouthEast in the late 1980s and early 1990s. Instead, 14 Class 332 trainsets were ordered from Siemens Transportation Systems in July 1994. These were built by CAF with traction equipment supplied by Siemens, and first entered service in 1998. Additional carriages were ordered in 1998 to extend the trains firstly to four carriages, then in 2001 to extend 5 of the trains to five carriages in length.

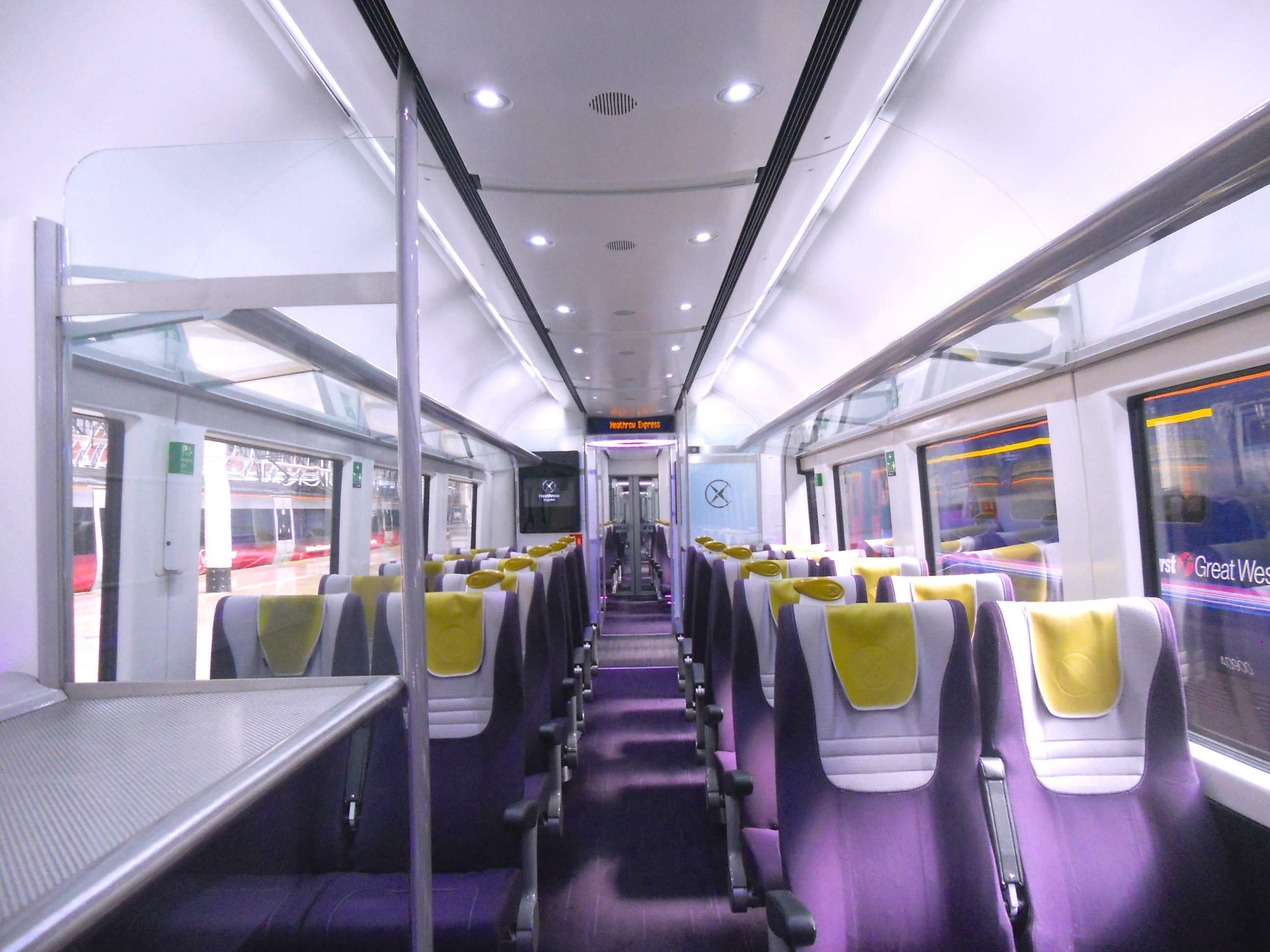
Refurbished standard class interior on a Class 332

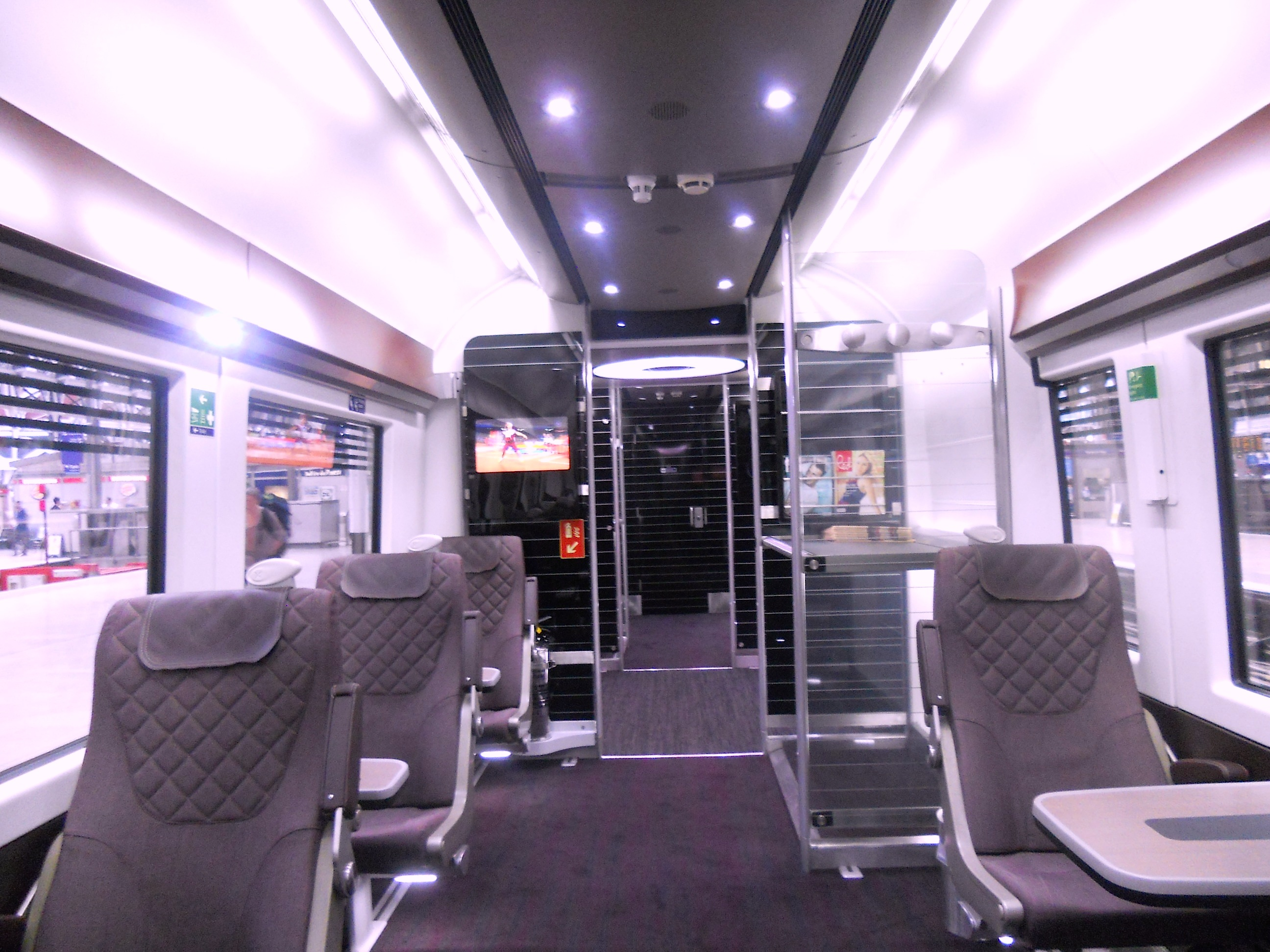
Refurbished first class interior on a Class 332

Until May 2018, Heathrow Express leased a singular Class 360 unit which operated the shuttle service between Heathrow Central and Heathrow Terminal 4. Following the withdrawal of the Class 360 unit, all Heathrow Express services were operated by Class 332 units. In 2019, it was announced that all the Class 332 units would be replaced by a fleet of twelve Class 387 units from Great Western Railway with GWR also managing their introduction and arrival. The first Class 332 unit was withdrawn and scrapped in November 2020 and by 28 December 2020, all of the units were withdrawn.

Class	Image	Type	Top speed		Number	Carriages	Built
Class	Image	Type	mph	km/h	Number	Carriages	Built
332		EMU	100	161	9	4	1997–1998
332		EMU	100	161	5	5	1997–1998
360/2 Desiro		EMU	100	161	1	5	2002–2005

== Future ==
In May 2026, Sadiq Khan and Transport for London called for the future of the Heathrow Express to be "reconsidered" due to the success of the Elizabeth line, which opened in 2022. The current contract for the Heathrow Express expires in 2028, meaning its access to the Great Western Main Line will expire if not renewed.

== See also ==
- Gatwick Express - a similar express service between London Victoria station and Gatwick Airport
- Stansted Express - a similar express service between London Liverpool Street station and London Stansted Airport
- Luton Airport Express - a similar express service between London St Pancras station and London Luton Airport
