= British Rail Class 332 =

British electric passenger train

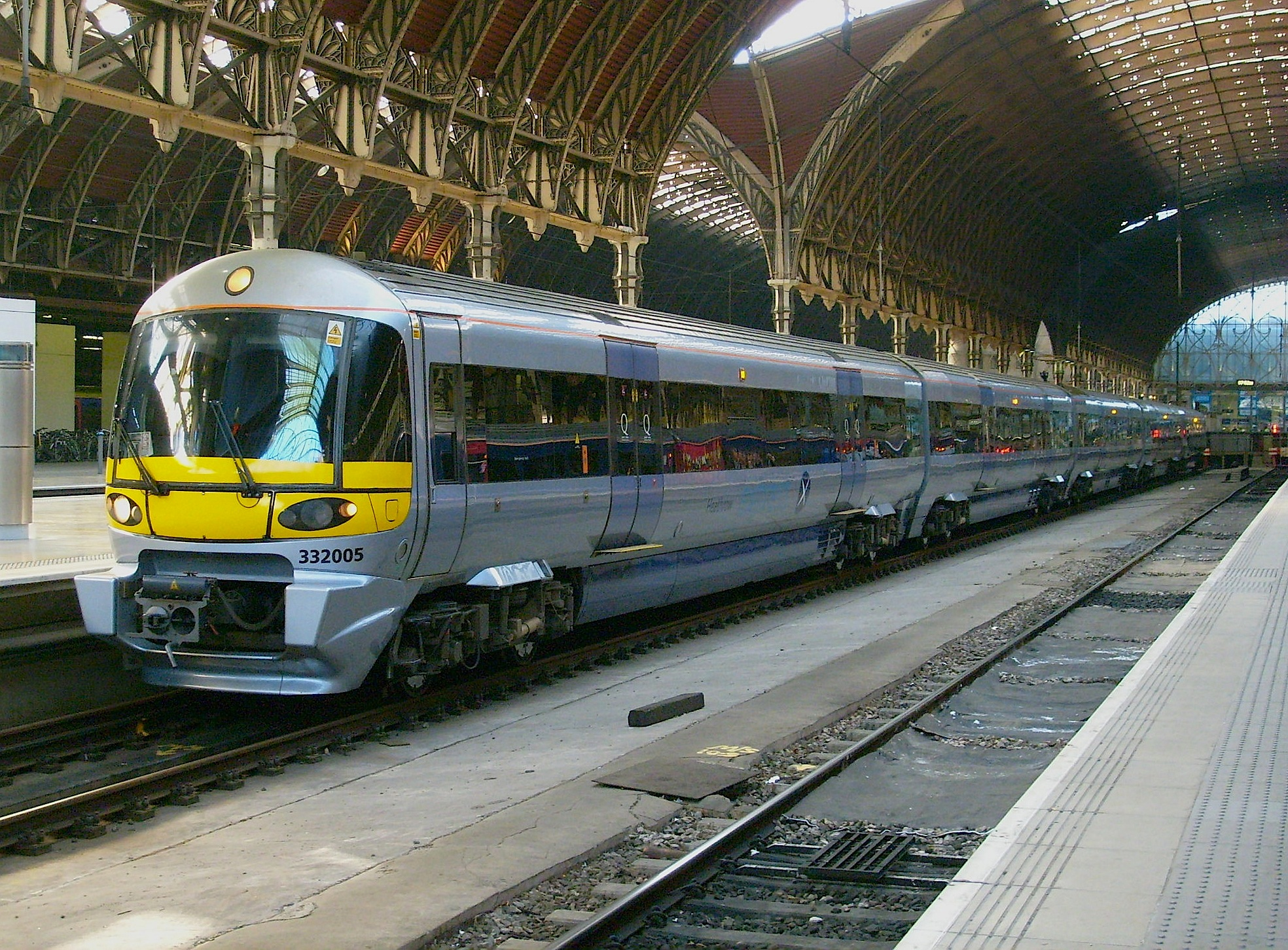
- Class 332 at London Paddington in 2007

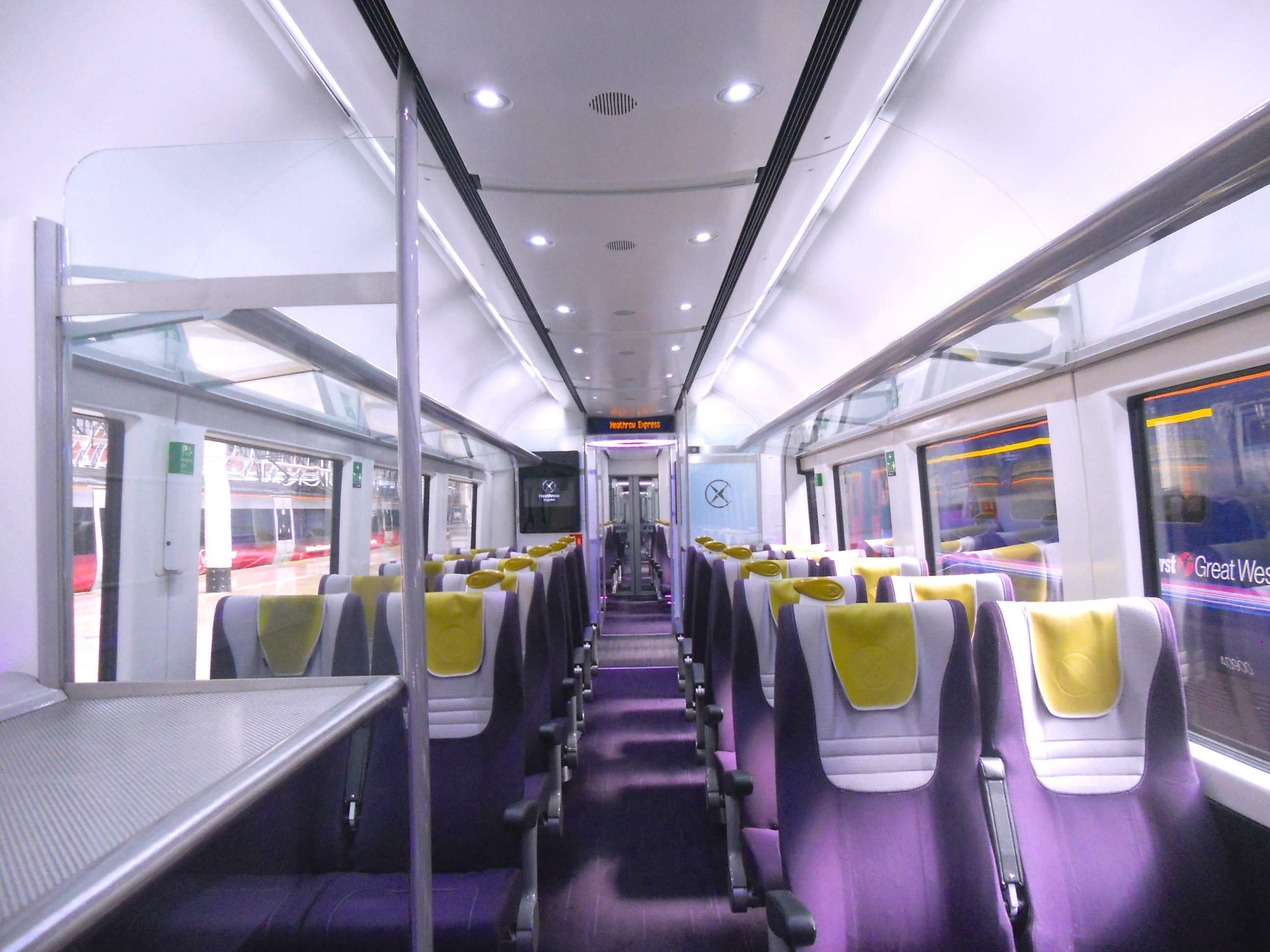
- Interior of a refurbished standard class carriage
- In service: 19 January 1998 – 28 December 2020
- Manufacturer: CAF
- Built at: Zaragoza, Spain
- Constructed: 1997–1998; 2002 (5 additional cars)
- Refurbished: 2012–2013
- Scrapped: 2020–2021
- Number built: 14
- Number preserved: 0; (2 cars from 1 unit)
- Number scrapped: 13
- Successor: Class 387
- Formation: 9 × 4-car units; (DMSO-PTSO-TSO-DMSO); 5 × 5-car units; (DMSO-TSO-PTSO-TSO-DMSO)
- Fleet numbers: 332001–332014
- Capacity: 4 cars: 203 seats; 5 cars: 267 seats
- Owner: Heathrow Airport Holdings
- Operator: Heathrow Express
- Depot: Old Oak Common (London)

Specifications
- Car body construction: Steel
- Train length: 4 cars: 93.68 m (307 ft 4 in) (Note: Over couplers.); 5 cars: 117.03 m (383 ft 11 in)
- Car length: End cars: 23.49 m (77 ft 1 in); Intermediate cars: 23.35 m (76 ft 7 in)
- Width: 2.73 m (8 ft 11 in)
- Height: 3.774 m (12 ft 4.6 in)
- Maximum speed: 109 mph (176 km/h)
- Weight: 4 cars: 173 t (170 long tons; 191 short tons); 5 cars: 208 t (205 long tons; 229 short tons)
- Traction system: Siemens E500 D600/860 M5 rdq-1 IGBT–C/I
- Traction motors: 8 × Siemens 1TB2215-0JA03 175 kW (235 hp) asychronous 3-phase AC
- Power output: 1,400 kW (1,900 hp)
- Gearbox: ZF-Hurth
- Acceleration: 1 m/s^{2} (2.2 mph/s)
- Electric system: 25 kV 50 Hz AC overhead
- Current collection: Pantograph
- UIC classification: 4 cars: Bo′Bo′+2′2′+2′2′+Bo′Bo′; 5 cars: Bo′Bo′+2′2′+2′2′+2′2′+Bo′Bo′
- Safety systems: ATP; AWS
- Coupling system: Scharfenberg Type 10
- Multiple working: Within class
- Track gauge: 1,435 mm (4 ft 8 1/2 in) standard gauge

Notes/references
- Sourced from except where noted

The British Rail Class 332 electric multiple unit passenger trains were built between 1997 and 1998 by CAF, with traction equipment supplied by Siemens Transportation Systems. Fourteen units were built for dedicated use on Heathrow Express services between London Paddington and Heathrow Airport. The last unit was withdrawn from service in 2020 and all 14 units were scrapped by the following year.

== History ==
Following BAA being granted rights to operate services from London Paddington to Heathrow Airport, 14 trains were ordered in July 1994 from Siemens Transportation Systems. They were built by CAF in Zaragoza, Spain. The first two were tested at the Velim railway test circuit and in Germany, while the next two were sent directly to England arriving at Old Oak Common TMD in March 1997.

The units had automatic train protection (ATP), one of the few fleets in the UK to do so. This was largely as a consequence of the Paddington-Heathrow route being mainly on the Great Western Main Line, which was equipped with ATP in the early 1990s as part of a trial of the system by British Rail. The units were not fitted with Train Protection & Warning System (TPWS). A derogation was issued in 2001, which exempted the class from mandatory TPWS installation, due to the fitment of the ATP. Given the lack of TPWS, the trains were not compatible for use elsewhere on the rail network.

The units were maintained at a purpose-built depot at Old Oak Common. Following withdrawal of the units, the depot was demolished as part of the construction of High Speed 2 and Old Oak Common station.

=== Operator ===
The Class first entered service on 19 January 1998 when services commenced from London Paddington to Heathrow Junction. They operated through to Terminal 4 from May 1998 until March 2008, when the Heathrow Express was diverted to serve Terminal 5.

The original order was for twelve three-car and two four-car sets. The twelve three-carriage sets were increased to four-car sets by the end of 1998. In 2002, five sets had a fifth car added.

=== 2016 recall ===
On 29 February 2016, the entire class was withdrawn after a structural defect was found on the underside of a driving car of unit number 332014. They were replaced by Heathrow Connect Class 360s. The Class 332 trains were gradually returned to service from 11 March 2016 onwards.

== Replacement ==
In March 2018, Heathrow Airport Holdings announced that operation of the Heathrow Express was to be contracted to Great Western Railway. However, in September 2019, Heathrow Express announced that Heathrow Airport Holdings were to continue owning Heathrow Express until at least 2028 and that instead, GWR would manage the introduction of the Class 387 to replace the Class 332.

The first unit, 332014 was sent to be scrapped in November 2020 at Sims Metal, Peterborough. The last day in service for the remaining Class 332 units was 28 December 2020. Apart from three carriages from 332001 that were retained by Siemens, the remaining sets were scrapped by Sims Metal, Newport in the first quarter of 2021.

== Further use ==
Car 63400 from 332001 was based at Siemens Goole for private use, it was later removed from the site.

Car 78400 from 332001 is now based at the Humberside Fire and Rescue Service, and is to be used as a training asset at their Immingham station.

== Fleet details ==
| Class | Status | No. Built | Year built | Cars per Set | Unit nos. | Notes |
|---|---|---|---|---|---|---|
| 332 | Scrapped | 14 | 1997–98 | 4 | 332001–004; 332010–014 | Car 63400 from 332001 was at Siemens Goole and was to be used to educate schoolchildren on visits and also host some training for apprentices at the factory. Car 78400 from 332001 is based at the Humberside Fire and Rescue Service and is to be used for training. |
| 332 | Scrapped | 14 | 1997–98 | 5 | 332005–009 | |

== See also ==
- British Rail Class 333, similar units operated by Northern Trains
