= Offworld =

Offworld or off-world may refer to:

- in science fiction, the quality of being on another planetary body or in space
- Offworld Trading Company, real-time strategy video game
- Offworld, a blog that became part of the website Boing Boing
- Offworld (album), the fourth vocal album by electronic rock project Celldweller
