= Et (Chinese pastry) =

Wheat or rice pastry

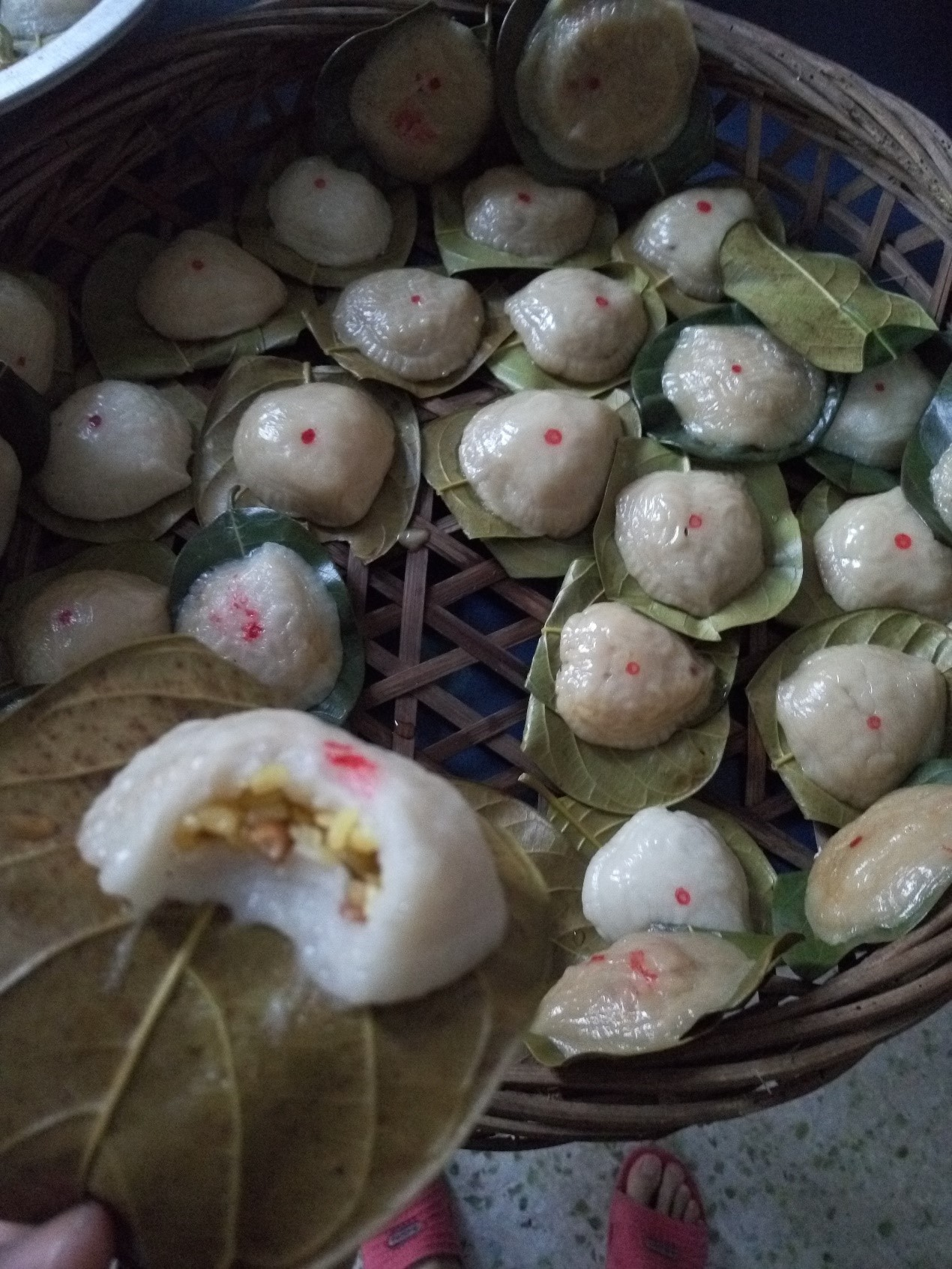
- Peach-shaped et
- Chinese: 䊦/籺
- Jyutping: et3
- Hanyu Pinyin: yè/yì
- Literal meaning: Things like Zongzi
Transcriptions
Standard Mandarin
- Hanyu Pinyin: yè/yì
Yue: Cantonese
- Jyutping: et3

Et (Zhuang: et), which means glutinous rice cakes on banana leaves, also known as "Yi Bua", is a traditional pastry made in the western parts of the Guangdong province of China. It symbolizes jubilance and is shared with relatives and friends during festivals such as the Spring Festival (also called Chinese New Year), Spirit Festival, and Winter Solstice, as well as in wedding ceremonies, birthday feasts, and housewarming parties.

== History ==
The people of Gaozhou County were the first to make Et and refine its production. Gaozhou was once a wasteland overgrown with weeds. After war broke out, a group of refugees made their way to the county and planted tubers and other coarse cereals (e.g. maize, sorghum, and millet). To make good use of the crops, the settlers used mallets to pound the grain into flour. The flour was mixed with water to form a smooth paste and steamed to increase its overall size.

Later, the people of Gaozhou successfully cultivated rice. To celebrate the harvest, they followed the same method of pounding the rice into flour, adding vegetable filling, and kneading them into various shapes. This was the original method of making Et. At first, round-grained rice flour was used to make Et, but glutinous rice flour was later found to be more suitable for making Et because it increased viscosity and improved taste.

== Stuffing ==
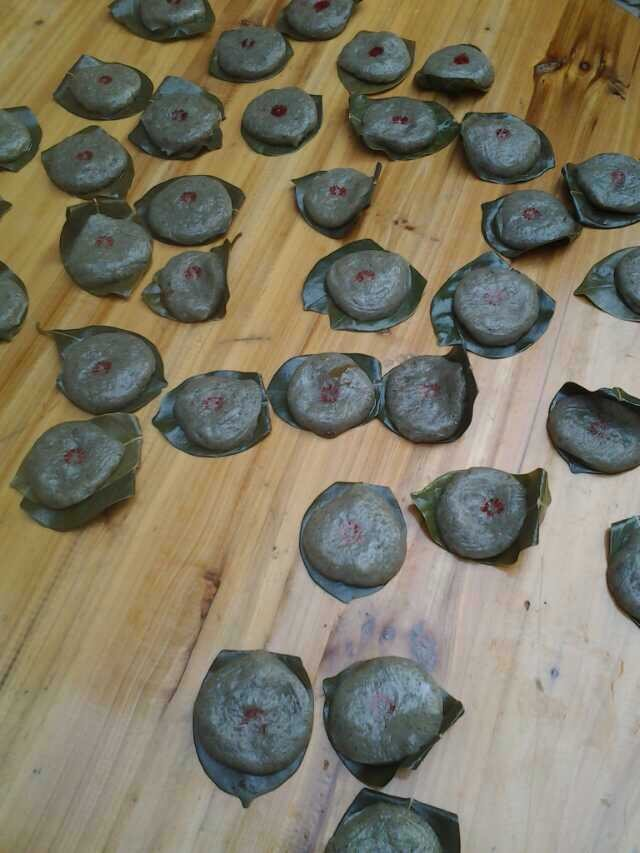
Peach-shaped wormwood Et

Et stuffing can vary according to taste. Usually, the stuffing is either sweet or salty. Sweet stuffing mainly contains sesame, peanuts, desiccated coconut, and lotus root. Salty stuffing mainly contains green beans, peanuts, bacon, and shrimp.

=== Dressing and sauces ===
Dressing and sauces are also important for Et. Generally, people in the western parts of Guangdong use ginger, peanut oil, soy sauce, and other traditional seasonings.

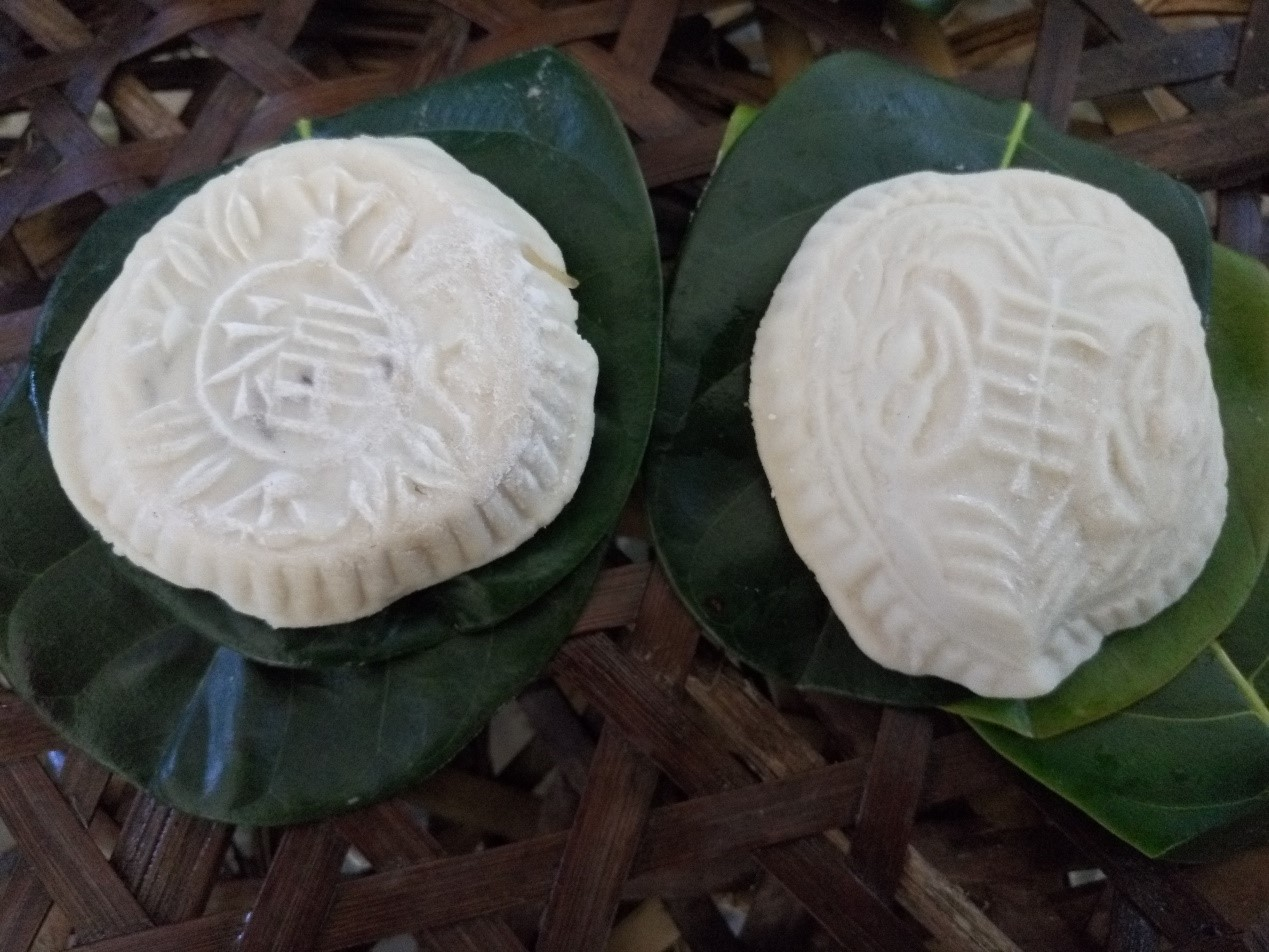
Raw Et

== Folklore ==
During the Tang dynasty (618–907 AD), the Nanshan god of longevity passed by Gaozhou County and accommodated himself in a courier hostel. At midnight, he heard a woman bursting into tears. He was curious and asked for information from the crying woman. He learned that the woman was an impoverished widow and completely bound by her parents-in-law. Her in-laws were seriously ill and she decided to go to seek a longevity herb to save their lives. The god was deeply moved by the woman's filial behaviours and gave her two balls of rice. The woman brought them home and made them into peach-shaped Et. After eating the Et, her in-laws recovered. From then on, this kind of Et represented longevity and ecstasy and gained growing popularity.
