= TFL =

TFL or TfL may refer to:

== Businesses and organisations ==
- Transport for London (TfL), an English public transport body
- TfL Rail, a former London rail service
- Trees for Life (disambiguation), several reforesting charities
- TUI fly Netherlands, a Dutch airline (ICAO:TFL)

== Sport ==
- Tackle for loss, a gridiron football defensive play
- Tamworth Football League, an Australian rules competition
- Tasmanian Football League, an Australian rules competition

== Science, medicine and technology ==
- Tensor fasciae latae muscle, a thigh/hip muscle
- Thermally fused laminate, or thermally fused melamine, a material
- Transient friction loading, vibrational mechanical stress

== Other uses ==
- Tyskarna från Lund, a Swedish synthpop band
- "True forced loneliness", a term used by incels
