= TfL Rail =

Two former commuter railway lines serving London, Essex, Berkshire and Buckinghamshire

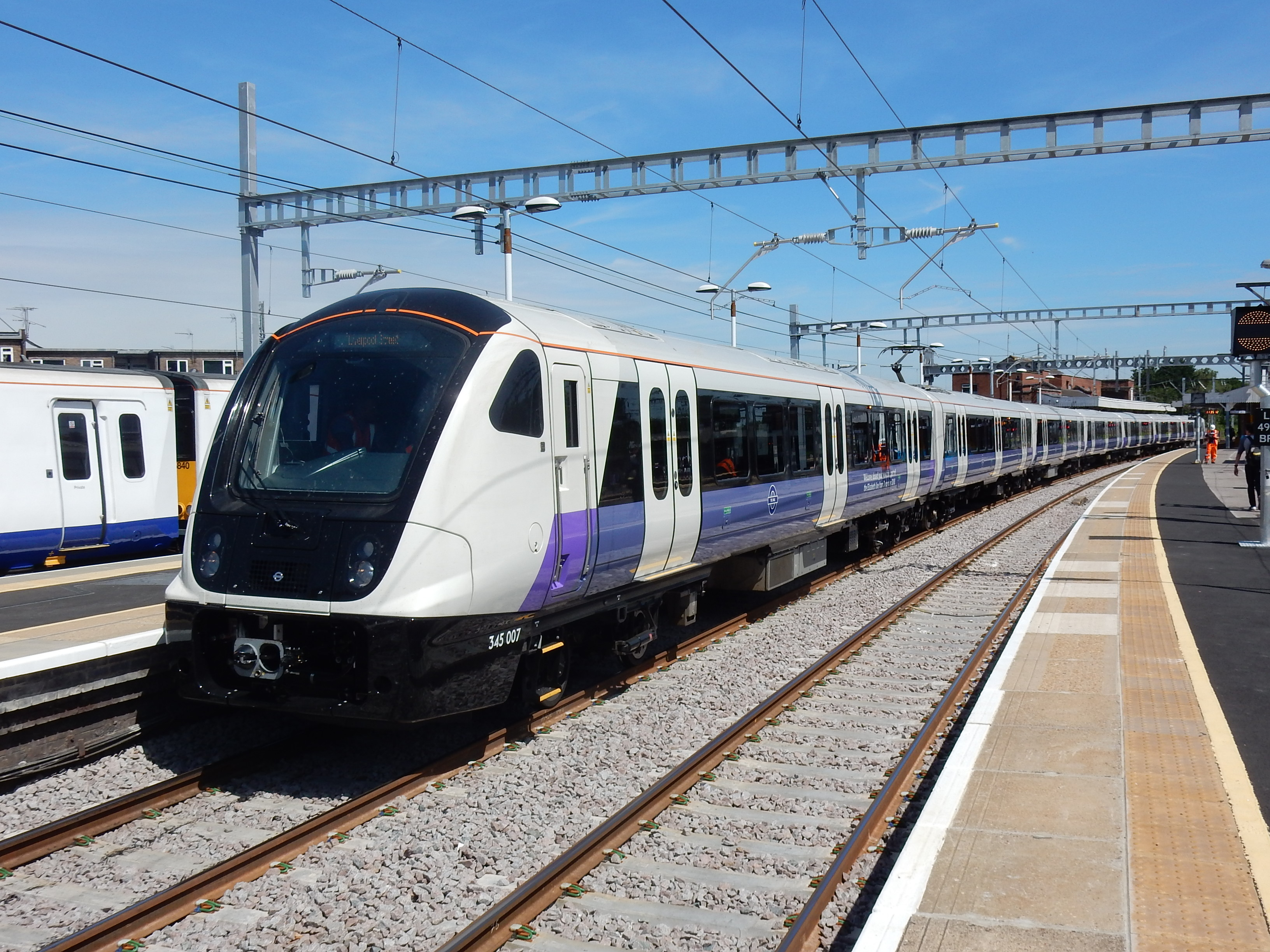
- A Class 345 at Shenfield

Overview
- Owner: Transport for London
- Locale: Greater London; Berkshire; Buckinghamshire; Essex
- Transit type: Commuter rail / rapid transit
- Number of lines: 2
- Line number: Shenfield – Liverpool Street; Paddington – Heathrow Terminal 4 / Reading
- Number of stations: 32 (24 managed)
- Website: tfl.gov.uk/modes/tfl-rail/

Operation
- Began operation: 31 May 2015; 11 years ago
- Ended operation: 23 May 2022; 4 years ago (rebranded as Elizabeth line)
- Operator: MTR Crossrail
- Reporting marks: XR

Technical
- System length: 36 miles 54 chains (59.0 km)
- Track gauge: 1,435 mm (4 ft 8 1/2 in) standard gauge
- Electrification: Overhead line, 25 kV 50 Hz AC

TfL Rail was the concession which operated commuter services on two separate railway lines in London, England and its environs whilst the Crossrail construction project linking these lines was underway. It ran from 2015 until May 2022, upon the opening of the Crossrail central section, when TfL Rail was rebranded as Elizabeth line and the name was discontinued.

TfL Rail was introduced on 31 May 2015 when it took control from Abellio Greater Anglia of the commuter "metro" service between London Liverpool Street in central London and Shenfield in Essex. The branch comprised the first 14 stations on the Great Eastern Main Line, with interchange at Shenfield for medium- and long-distance services beyond to East Anglia. TfL Rail had also taken over operation of some services from Paddington to Heathrow Airport and Reading. Services were operated by MTR Crossrail under contract to Transport for London (TfL). Between May 2016 and May 2017, TfL Rail carried over 47 million passengers on the Shenfield branch.

== History ==
In June 2013, TfL announced that Arriva, MTR Corporation, Keolis / Go-Ahead Group and National Express had been shortlisted to bid for the concession to operate Crossrail, which was under construction.

In July 2014, TfL awarded the contract to Hong Kong's MTR, for a duration of eight years with an option to extend by an additional two years.

MTR Crossrail was created as a new train operating company and took control of the "metro" service between London Liverpool Street and Shenfield from the previous operator, Abellio Greater Anglia, on 31 May 2015. The existing Class 315 trains were re-painted in TfL Rail livery, and appropriate branding, advertising and message boards were added at the 14 stations along the line. Every station was staffed, from the first train to the last of the day. In June 2017, Class 345 trains began running between London Liverpool Street and Shenfield.

In May 2018, TfL Rail took over operation of the Heathrow Connect service between London Paddington and Heathrow, as well as some GWR services between London Paddington and Hayes & Harlington. In December 2019, TfL Rail took over operation of the Great Western Railway stopping services between London Paddington and Reading. In November 2019, Class 345 trains began running between London Paddington and Reading, as a soft launch of the service. In July 2020, Class 345 trains began running between London Paddington and Heathrow.

The two branches became part of the Elizabeth line when the central section opened on 24 May 2022, with the current branches connecting up with the core later.

== Route ==
The eastern branch of TfL Rail ran over the existing 20 miles 16 chains (32.5 km) of track on the Great Eastern Main Line between London Liverpool Street and Shenfield. The western branches operated over part of the Great Western Main Line and the Heathrow tunnel between London Paddington and Heathrow for 16 miles 38 chains (26.5 km), and entirely over the Great Western Main Line between London Paddington and Reading for 36 miles (58 km).

=== Stations ===
Stations served or managed by TfL Rail
Station	Image	Dates			Location		
Station	Image	Opened	Managed from	Served from	Zone	Local authority	
Reading		30 March 1840	Managed by Network Rail	15 December 2019	N/A (Note: Stations between Iver and Reading only accept contactless Pay-as-you-go and are therefore not in the Oyster zones)	Reading	
Twyford		1 July 1839	Managed by Great Western Railway	15 December 2019	N/A	Wokingham	
Maidenhead		1 November 1871	Managed by Great Western Railway	15 December 2019	N/A	Windsor and Maidenhead	
Taplow		1 September 1872	May 2018	15 December 2019	N/A	Buckinghamshire	
Burnham		1 July 1899	May 2018	15 December 2019	N/A	Slough	
Slough		8 September 1884	Managed by Great Western Railway	15 December 2019	N/A	Slough	
Langley		1845	May 2018	15 December 2019	N/A	Slough	
Iver		1 December 1924	May 2018	15 December 2019	N/A	Buckinghamshire	
West Drayton		4 June 1838	May 2018	15 December 2019	6	Hillingdon	
Heathrow Terminal 5 (Note: Heathrow Terminal 5 was not officially served by TfL Rail, but services were diverted to this station when Heathrow Terminal 4 was closed during COVID-19)		27 March 2008	Managed by Heathrow Express	Diversions only	6	Hillingdon	
Heathrow Terminal 4		23 June 1998	Managed by Heathrow Express	May 2018	6	Hillingdon	
Heathrow Terminals 2 & 3		23 June 1998	Managed by Heathrow Express	May 2018	6	Hillingdon	
Hayes & Harlington		1864 or 1868	May 2018	May 2018	5	Hillingdon	
Southall		1 May 1839	May 2018	May 2018	4	Ealing	
Hanwell		1 December 1838	May 2018	May 2018	4	Ealing	
West Ealing		4 June 1838	May 2018	May 2018	3	Ealing	
Ealing Broadway		1 December 1838	May 2018	May 2018	3	Ealing	
Acton Main Line		1 February 1868	May 2018	May 2018	3	Ealing	
London Paddington		4 June 1838	Managed by Network Rail	May 2018	1	City of Westminster	
Sections disconnected
London Liverpool Street		2 October 1874	Managed by Network Rail	31 May 2015	1	City of London	
Stratford		20 June 1839	31 May 2015	31 May 2015		2/3	Newham
Maryland		6 January 1873	31 May 2015	31 May 2015	3		Newham
Forest Gate		1840	31 May 2015	31 May 2015	3		Newham
Manor Park		6 January 1873	31 May 2015	31 May 2015	3/4		Newham
Ilford		20 June 1839	31 May 2015	31 May 2015	4	Redbridge	
Seven Kings		1 March 1899	31 May 2015	31 May 2015	4	Redbridge	
Goodmayes		8 February 1901	31 May 2015	31 May 2015	4	Redbridge	
Chadwell Heath		11 January 1864	31 May 2015	31 May 2015	5	Redbridge	
Romford		20 June 1839	31 May 2015	31 May 2015	6	Havering	
Gidea Park		1 December 1910	31 May 2015	31 May 2015	6	Havering	
Harold Wood		1 December 1868	31 May 2015	31 May 2015	6	Havering	
Brentwood		1 July 1840	31 May 2015	31 May 2015	9	Brentwood	
Shenfield		29 March 1843	Managed by Greater Anglia	31 May 2015	C	Brentwood	
Sections disconnected
Abbey Wood		30 July 1849	23 October 2017	not served until Elizabeth line opened	4	Bexley	

== Former services ==
=== Shenfield branch ===
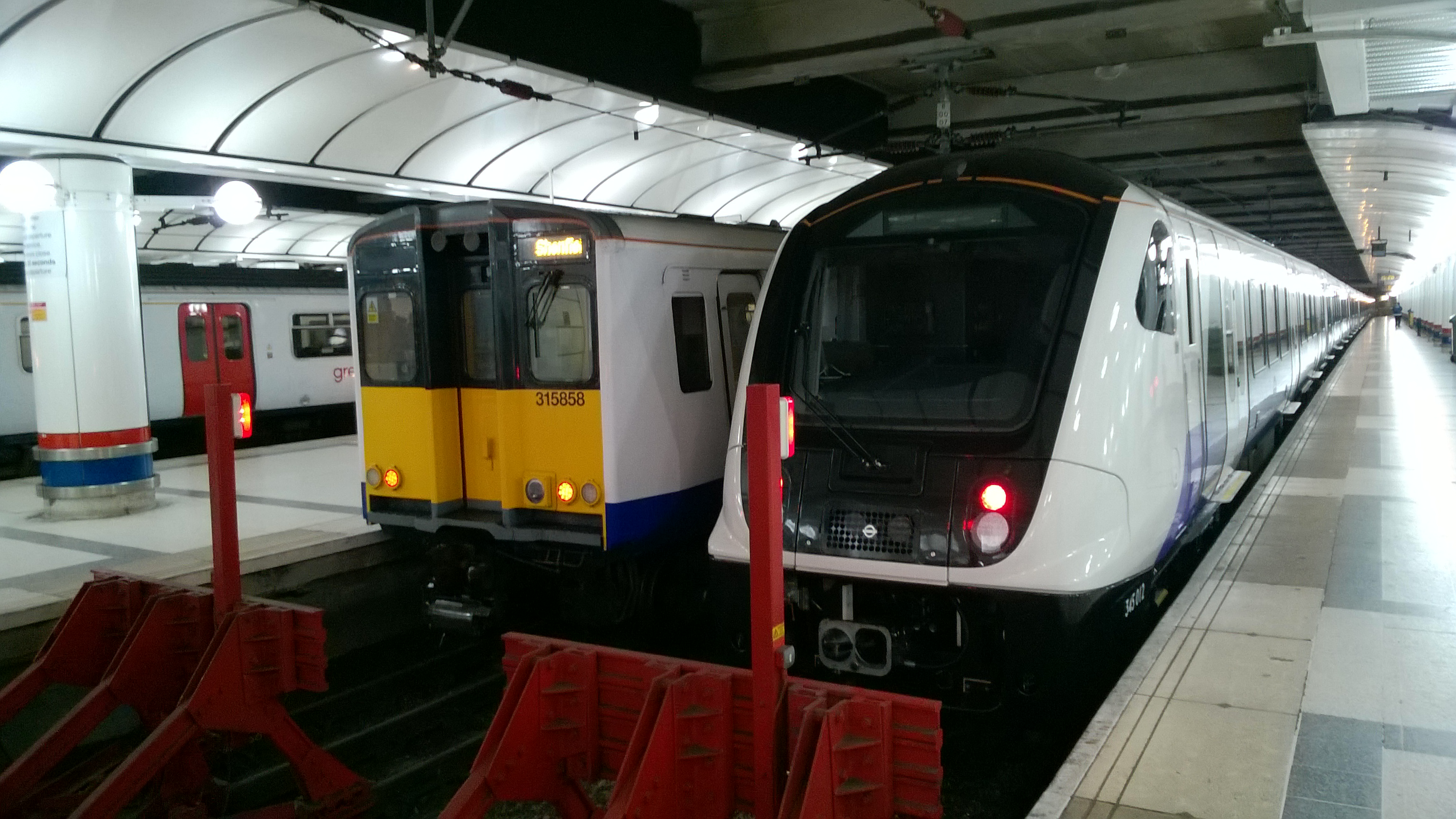
A Class 315 and Class 345 at London Liverpool Street

TfL Rail took over operations from Abellio Greater Anglia on 31 May 2015. TfL Rail subsequently introduced a fleet of new Class 345 trains. On 22 June 2017, Class 345 trains entered passenger service on the Shenfield branch.

The Class 315 trains continued to be maintained at the existing Ilford depot, with the Class 345 trains maintained at both Old Oak Common and Ilford depots.

=== Heathrow branch ===
TfL Rail inherited five Class 360 units from Heathrow Connect when it took over operations on 20 May 2018. These trains were used to operate the existing half-hourly (2tph) service to Heathrow. On 30 July 2020, Class 345 trains entered passenger service on the Heathrow branch. The last Class 360 trains were withdrawn in September 2020.

=== Reading branch ===
On 26 September 2019, TfL Rail announced that it would take over the Paddington to Reading stopping services on 15 December 2019, using Class 345 trains in place of the Class 387 and Class 165 trains used by Great Western Railway. Before that, on 25 November 2019 six GWR services a day started to operate using Class 345 trains, operated by TfL, to get drivers ready and stock in place for the main 15 December switch over.

=== Route tables ===
Prior to the opening of the Elizabeth line on 24 May 2022, the timetabled weekday off-peak service pattern consisted of:

Shenfield branch
Route	tph	Calling at	Stock
London Liverpool Street to Shenfield	8	Stratford; Maryland; Forest Gate; Manor Park; Ilford; Seven Kings; Goodmayes; Chadwell Heath; Romford; Gidea Park; Harold Wood; Brentwood	345 315
Reading and Heathrow branches
Route	tph	Calling at	Stock
London Paddington to Reading	2 (Note: During peak times, service frequency increased up to 4 trains per hour)	Ealing Broadway; Southall; Hayes & Harlington; West Drayton; Iver; Langley; Slough; Burnham; Taplow; Maidenhead; Twyford	345
London Paddington to Hayes & Harlington	2	Ealing Broadway; West Ealing; Hanwell; Southall	345
London Paddington to Heathrow Terminal 4 (Note: During the COVID-19 pandemic, Heathrow Terminal 4 station was closed, services diverted to Heathrow Terminal 5)	2	Acton Main Line; Ealing Broadway; West Ealing; Hanwell; Southall; Hayes & Harlington; Heathrow Terminals 2 & 3	345

== Rolling stock ==
=== Fleet carried over to the Elizabeth line ===
Class	Image	Type	Top speed		Carriages	Number	Routes operated	Built	Years in operation
Class	Image	Type	mph	km/h	Carriages	Number	Routes operated	Built	Years in operation
Class 315		EMU	75	120	4	20	Liverpool Street – Shenfield	1980–1981	1980–2022
Class 345 Aventra		EMU	90	145	7 or 9	70	Liverpool Street – Shenfield; Paddington – Reading; Paddington – Heathrow Airport	2015–2019	June 2017–present

=== Past fleet ===
Former units operated by TfL Rail include:

Class	Image	Type	Top speed		Carriages	Number	Routes operated	Built	Withdrawn
Class	Image	Type	mph	km/h	Carriages	Number	Routes operated	Built	Withdrawn
Class 360 Desiro		EMU	100	160	5	5	London Paddington – Heathrow Terminal 4 (Heathrow Connect)	2004–2005	2020
