= Hanwell railway station =

National Rail station in London, England

Hanwell
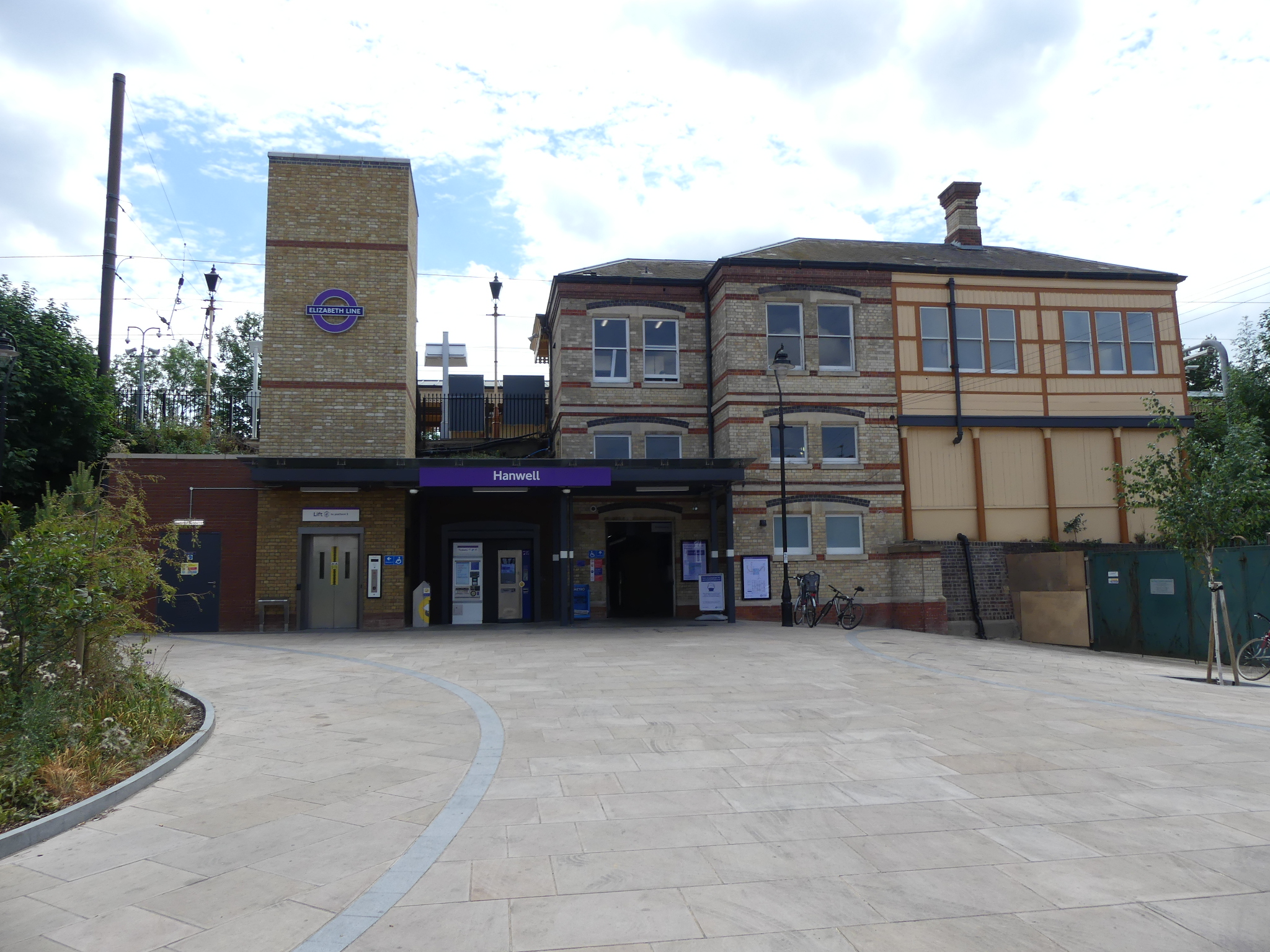
- Station entrance as seen in July 2022
- Interactive map of Hanwell

General information
- Location: Hanwell
- Local authority: London Borough of Ealing
- Managed by: Elizabeth line
- Owner: Network Rail
- Station code: HAN
- DfT category: E
- Number of platforms: 3
- Tracks: 4
- Accessible: Yes
- Fare zone: 4

National Rail annual entry and exit
- 2020–21: ▼0.182 million
- 2021–22: ▲0.541 million
- 2022–23: ▲0.922 million
- 2023–24: ▲1.468 million
- 2024–25: ▲1.691 million

Key dates
- 1 December 1838: Opened as Hanwell
- 1 April 1896: Renamed Hanwell and Elthorne
- 6 May 1974: Renamed Hanwell

Other information
- External links: Departures; Facilities
- Coordinates: 51.5116°N 0.3389°W

Hanwell railway station serves the town of Hanwell in the London Borough of Ealing. It is 7 miles 28 chains (11.8 km) down the line from London Paddington and is situated between West Ealing and Southall.

All trains serving Hanwell are operated by the Elizabeth line, having taken over the Heathrow Connect stopping services between London Paddington and Heathrow Airport, and Great Western Railway local services between London Paddington and Hayes & Harlington from the 20 May 2018 timetable change. From the 17 May 2020 timetable change, Hanwell station gained a Sunday service. In November 2021 the Ealing Civic Society recognized the quality of the renovations to the station building by awarding the station the society's annual award.

== History ==
The station is on the original line of the Great Western Railway which opened on 4 June 1838, although Hanwell station was not ready until December of that year; it opened on 1 December. From 1 March 1883, the station was served by District Railway services running between Mansion House and Windsor; the service was discontinued as uneconomic after 30 September 1885. The station was renamed Hanwell and Elthorne on 1 April 1896, and reverted to Hanwell on 6 May 1974. Re-built circa 1875–77 some 250m east of its original location at the time the main line was quadrupled, it has been declared a grade II listed building by English Heritage.

The south entrance was closed in the 1970s, but reopened in December 2014 with funding from Ealing Council and Transport for London.

As part of the Crossrail project, Hanwell station gained step-free access via lifts from platform to ticket office level in early 2020.

== Description ==
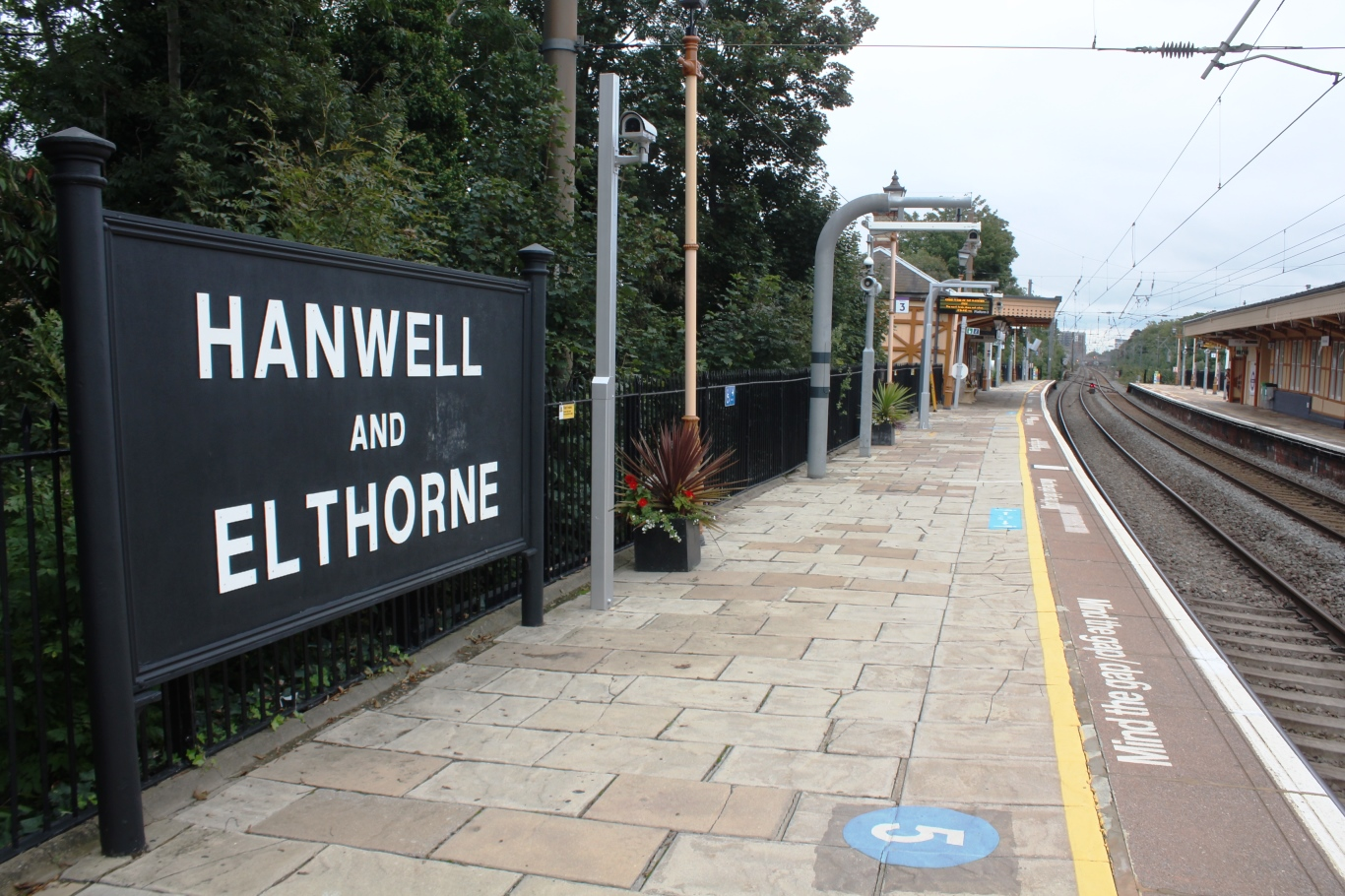
Original name board on Platform 3 in 2021

The station is sited a short distance east of the Grade I listed Wharncliffe Viaduct.

Some of the original station nameboards with the pre-1974 name Hanwell and Elthorne are still on the platforms.

== Services ==
As of the May 2023 timetable, the typical Monday to Friday off-peak Elizabeth line service is:

- 4 tph (trains per hour) westbound to Heathrow Terminal 4
- 4 tph eastbound to Abbey Wood

A Sunday service was introduced at the station in May 2020. Prior to this, the station was closed on Sundays.

From October 2008, Oyster "pay as you go" can be used for journeys originating or ending at Hanwell.

Preceding station	Elizabeth line	Following station
Southall towards Heathrow Terminal 4	Elizabeth line	West Ealing towards Abbey Wood
Historical railways
Preceding station	London Underground	Following station
Southall towards Windsor	District line	West Ealing towards Mansion House

== Connections ==
London Buses route E3 serves the station.
