= British Rail Class 360 =

British class of electric multiple units

Class 360 Desiro
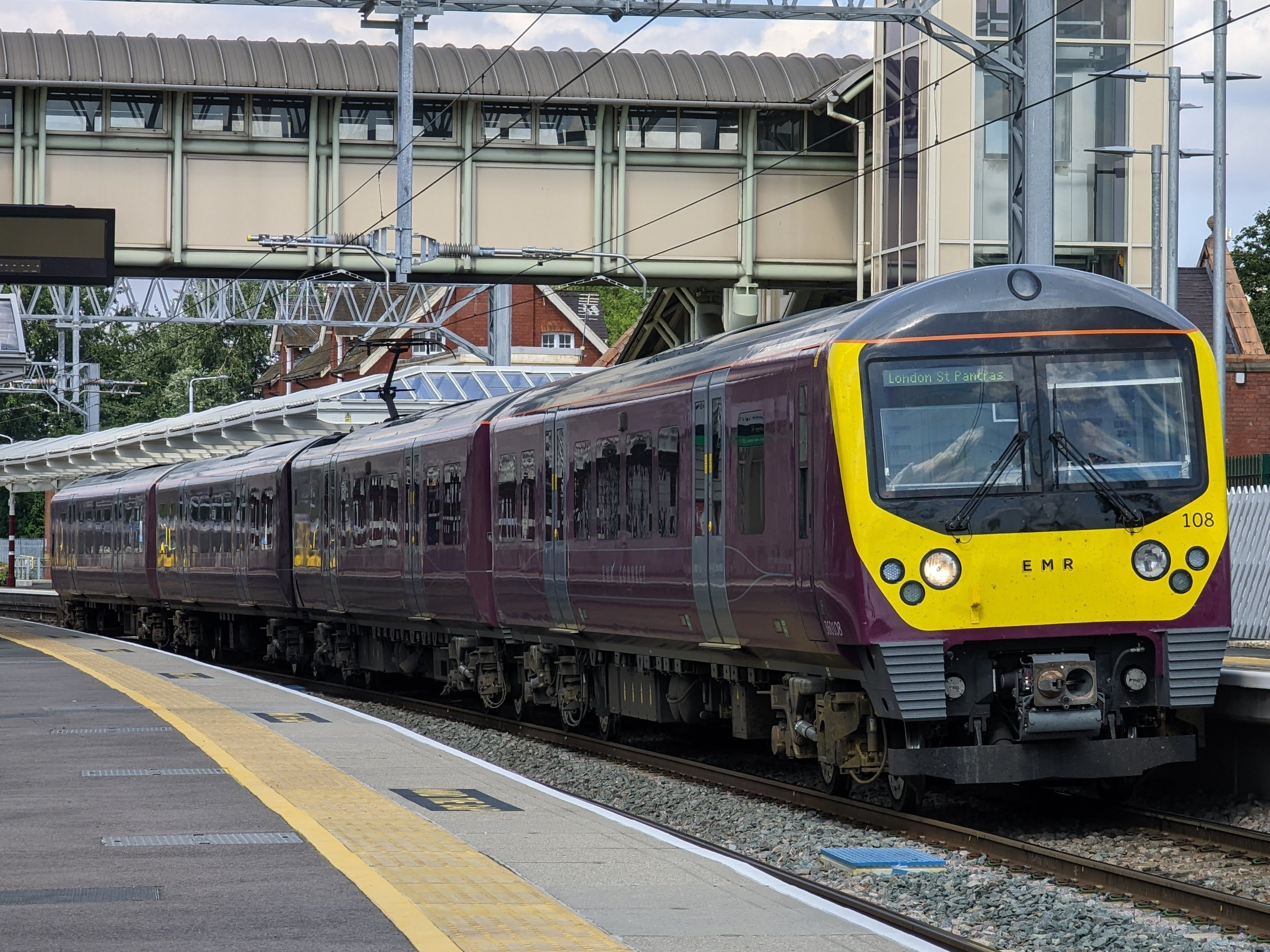
- An EMR Class 360 at Kettering (2022)

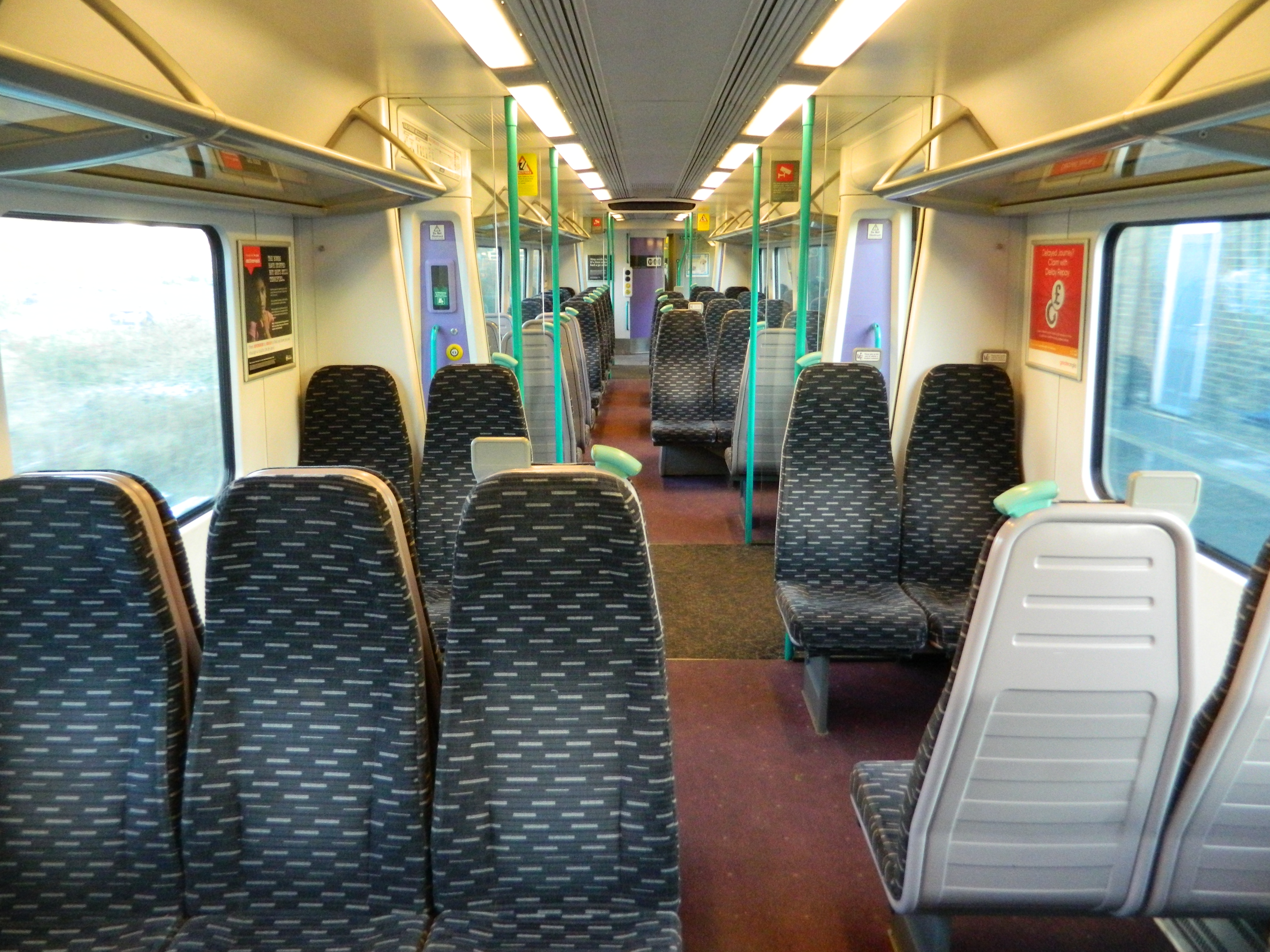
- Interior of a Abellio Greater Anglia Class 360/1 unit
- In service: 12 August 2003 – present
- Manufacturer: Siemens Mobility
- Built at: Vienna, Austria; (Note: Some Class 360/1s.); Uerdingen, Germany (Note: Class 360/2 and some 360/1s.)
- Family name: Desiro
- Replaced: Class 222; Class 312
- Constructed: 360/1: 2002–2003, 360/2: 2004–2005
- Number built: 26 (21×360/1, 5×360/2)
- Number in service: 21
- Number scrapped: 2
- Successor: Class 345; Class 720
- Formation: Four cars per 360/1 unit: DMSO-PTSO-TSO-DMSO.; Five cars per 360/2 unit: DMSO-PTSO-TSO-TSO-DMSO
- Fleet numbers: 360101–360121, 360201–360205
- Capacity: 360/1: 280 seats; (16 first and 264 standard), 360/2: 333 seats
- Owners: Current: Angel Trains (360/1), Global Centre of Rail Excellence (360/2).; Former: Heathrow Airport Holdings (360/2), Rail Operations Group (360/2)
- Operators: Current: East Midlands Railway; Former: First Great Eastern, Abellio Greater Anglia, Heathrow Connect, Heathrow Express, National Express East Anglia, TfL Rail
- Depots: Current: Cauldwell Walk (Bedford), Former: Ilford EMU (London), Old Oak Common (London)

Specifications
- Car body construction: Aluminium
- Car length: 20.34 m (66 ft 9 in)
- Width: 2.80 m (9 ft 2 in)
- Height: 3.95 m (13 ft 0 in)
- Doors: Bi-parting Sliding plug
- Maximum speed: 360/1: 110 mph (177 km/h), 360/2: 100 mph (161 km/h)
- Weight: 360/1: 168 t (165 long tons; 185 short tons).; 360/2: 203 t (200 long tons; 224 short tons)
- Traction motors: 8 × Siemens 1TB2016-0GB02 asynchronous three-phase AC; (4 per DMSO car)
- Power output: 1,550 kW (2,080 hp) (at wheels)
- Acceleration: 0.98 m/s^{2} (3.2 ft/s^{2})
- Electric system: 25 kV 50 Hz AC overhead
- Current collection: Pantograph
- UIC classification: 360/1: Bo′Bo′+2′2′+2′2′+Bo′Bo′; 360/2: Bo′Bo′+2′2′+2′2′+2′2′+Bo′Bo′
- Bogies: Siemens SGP SF5000
- Braking systems: Air, regenerative
- Safety system: AWS, TPWS, ATP (360/2 only)
- Coupling system: Dellner 12
- Multiple working: Within subclass
- Track gauge: 1,435 mm (4 ft 8 1/2 in) standard gauge

Notes/references
- Sourced from except where otherwise noted.

The British Rail Class 360 is a type of electric multiple unit that was built by Siemens Mobility, on its Desiro platform between 2002 and 2005, for First Great Eastern and Heathrow Connect. Almost all of the class are now operated by East Midlands Railway.

== Description ==
=== Class 360/1 ===
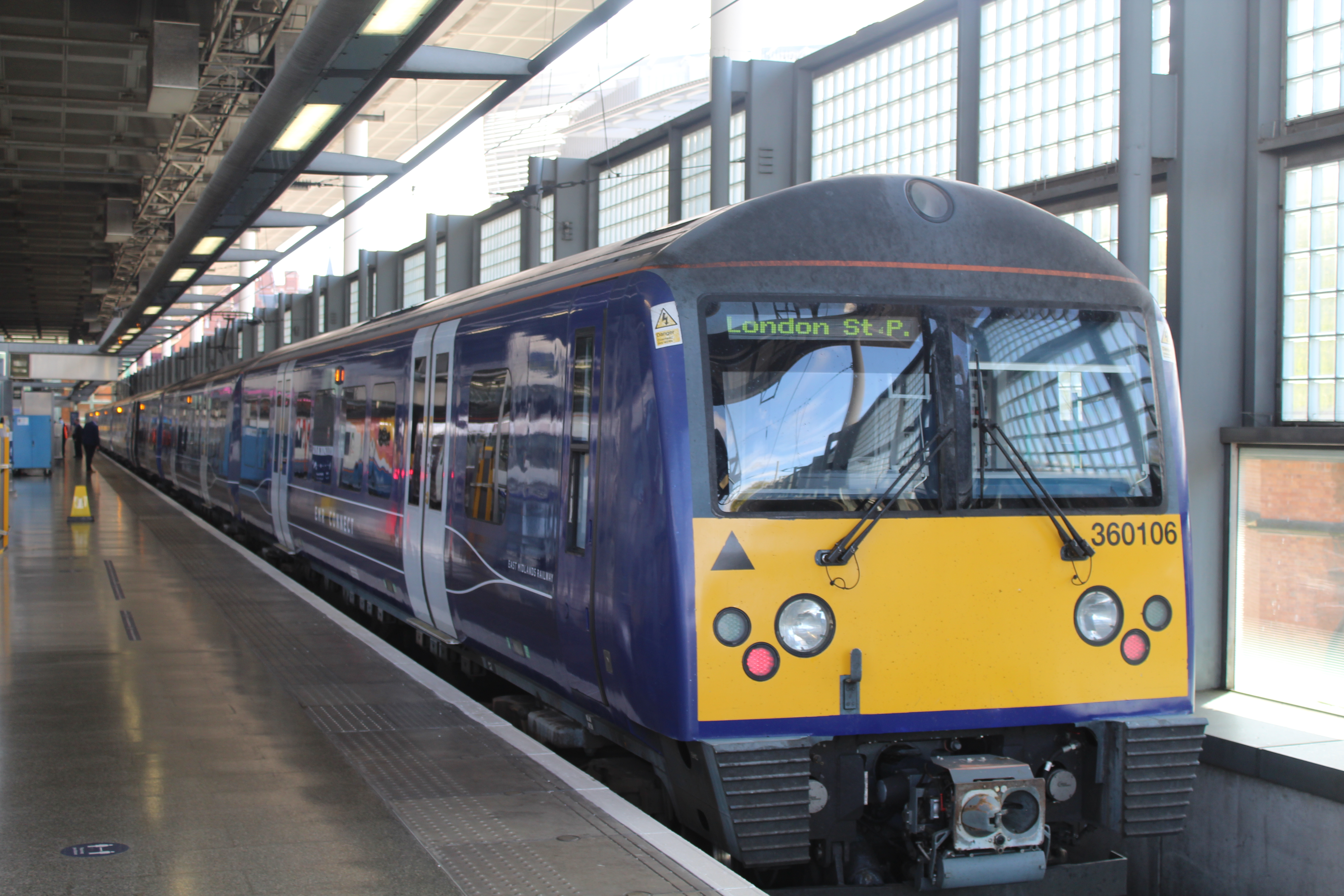
An EMR Class 360 in Abellio Greater Anglia livery

First Great Eastern ordered 21 four-car Class 360/1s to replace its slam-door Class 312 units. Built in Vienna in Austria and Uerdingen in Germany, the units feature air conditioning, plug doors, CCTV, a wheelchair area and first class seating at the cab ends. After being tested at the Wildenrath in Germany and Velim test tracks in the Czech Republic, the first entered service in August 2003. In February 2004, unit 360115 returned to Wildenrath for tests aimed at improving pantograph performance.

They were used primarily on Great Eastern Main Line services from London Liverpool Street to Clacton-on-Sea, Colchester Town and Ipswich; they also ran to Walton-on-the-Naze, the Mayflower line to Harwich Town and occasionally through to Norwich.

In April 2004, Great Eastern operations was merged into the Greater Anglia franchise that was awarded to National Express East Anglia. All units passed with the franchise to Greater Anglia in February 2012 and were maintained by Siemens Mobility at Ilford EMU Depot.

All units were replaced by Class 720s in 2020/21 and were leased to East Midlands Railway (EMR), to operate services on the Midland Main Line between London St Pancras and Corby from May 2021. They were modified to operate at 110 mph (177 km/h) and are based at Bedford Cauldwell Walk depot.

Beginning in June 2020, all were cycled through Siemens at Kings Heath Depot in Northampton to be modified for 110 mph (177 km/h) operation. The first was transferred to EMR's Cricklewood Depot in November 2020, with all having transferred by February 2021.

They entered service with East Midlands Railway on 16 May 2021, after the electrification of the Midland Main Line was completed in 2020, between Bedford and Corby. Two units had received a temporary application of the EMR Connect livery; full-scale repainting of the fleet began in June 2021.

A refurbishment programme has commenced, with the first two units completed in June 2026.

=== Class 360/2 ===
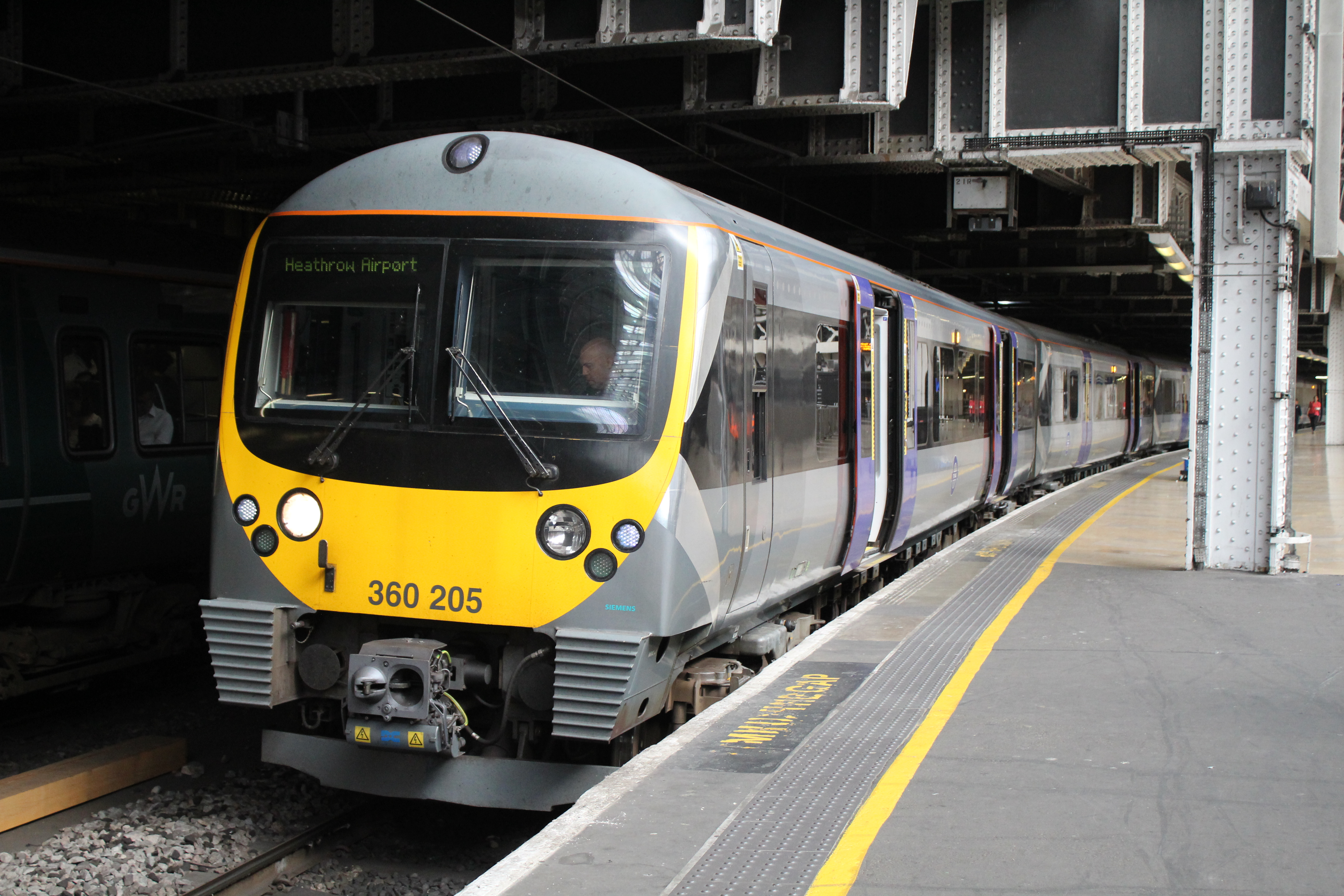
A TfL Rail Class 360 at London Paddington (2019)

In June 2003, BAA plc ordered four Class 360 units for its Heathrow Connect service, which was designed to complement the non-stop Heathrow Express service by calling at a number of intermediate stations between London Paddington and Heathrow Airport. Siemens fulfilled the order by rebuilding four Class 350/0 units it had previously built in speculation of an order from Angel Trains. One of these, 350001, had already been delivered to England and was being used for training by South West Trains at Northam Traincare Facility, while the others remained at the Wildenrath test track in Germany.

The first rebuilt unit arrived at Heathrow Connect's Old Oak Common depot in November 2004, and services commenced in June 2005. An additional unit was subsequently ordered; it arrived in England in November 2005, but did not enter service for a further 12 months.

In 2007, five additional intermediate vehicles were procured and used to lengthen each unit to five carriages. In 2010, one unit began operating a Heathrow Central to Heathrow Terminal 4 shuttle, with a new Heathrow Express livery.

In May 2018, TfL Rail inherited all five of Heathrow Connect's Class 360s, which were replaced by Class 345 units once problems with the European Train Control System in the Heathrow tunnel were resolved. On 30 July 2020, Class 345 units began entering passenger service on the Heathrow branch and the last Class 360 units were withdrawn on 13 September 2020.

In February 2021, Rail Operations Group (ROG) purchased the five-strong fleet from Heathrow Airport Holdings. The fleet was moved to MoD Bicester for storage pending further use with the company, which potentially included conversion into fast freight units. In August 2022, ROG stated that the units would not be repurposed due to technical issues and that they wished the units to return to passenger service. However, this did not occur and, on 23 August 2022, unit 360205 was taken to Sims Metal in Newport, South Wales, to be scrapped. Unit 360204 followed shortly thereafter.

In October 2022, it was announced that the remaining three units had been acquired by the Global Centre of Rail Excellence (GCRE). The units will be used in the running-in process for the GCRE's infrastructure test track, as well as being made available to the railway industry as research and development test trains.

== Accidents and incidents ==
- On 25 May 2014, unit 360205 derailed as it entered London Paddington due to bogie maintenance errors, exacerbated by a track defect.
- On 19 June 2026, unit 360115 collided with a Class 810 just south of Bedford. The driver was killed and 100 people were injured.

== Fleet details ==
Class	Operator	Quantity	Year built	Cars per unit	Unit nos.
360/1	East Midlands Railway	21	2002–2003	4	360101–360121
360/2	Global Centre of Rail Excellence	3	2004–2005	5	360201–360203
360/2	Scrapped	2	2004–2005	5	360204–360205

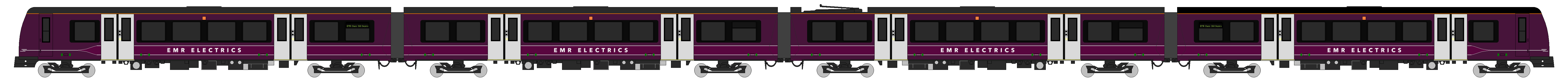
Side-profile illustration of an East Midlands Railway Class 360/1 unit
