= British Rail Class 345 =

British electric passenger train

British Rail Class 345 Aventra
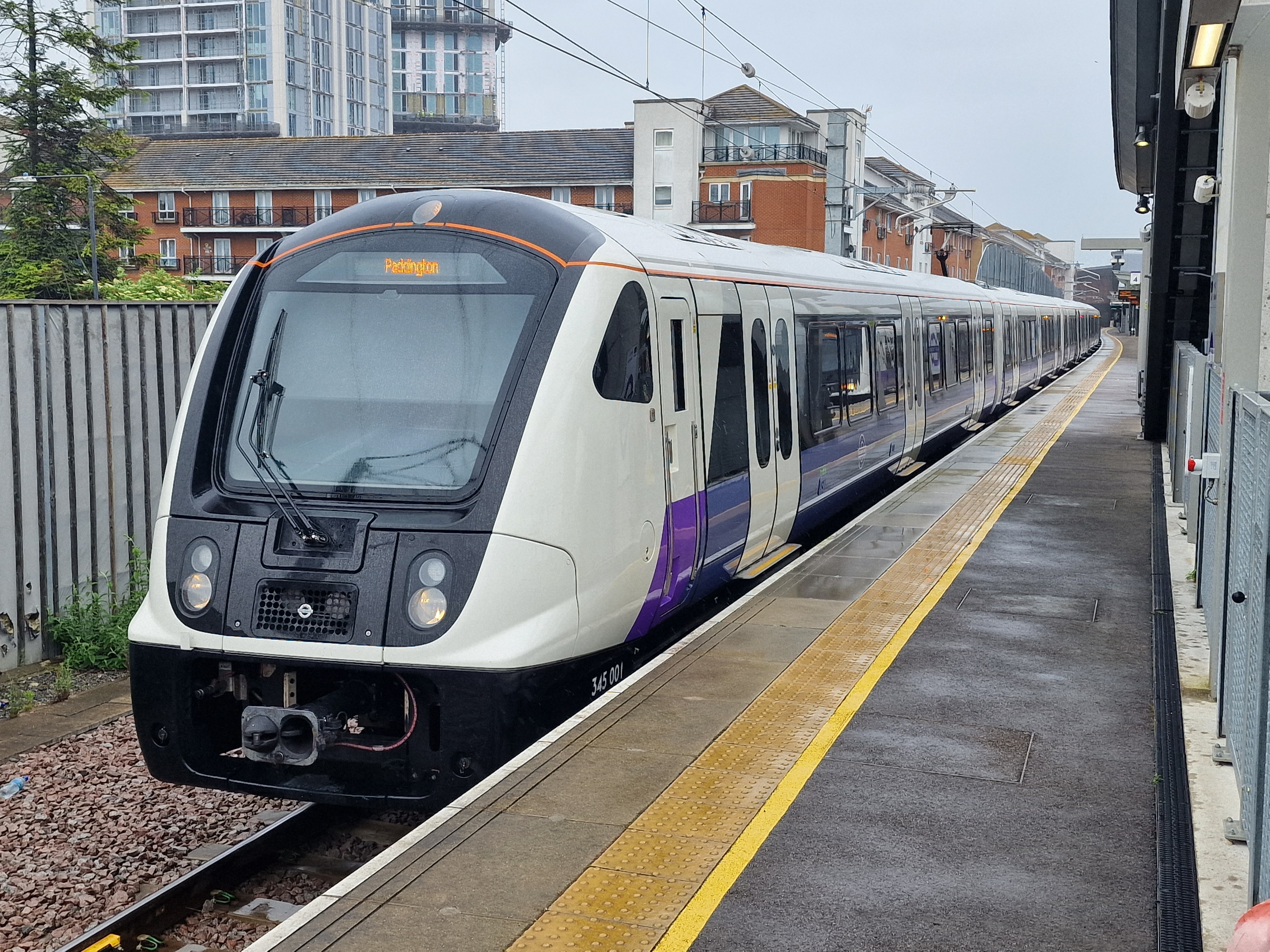
- Class 345 unit at Abbey Wood

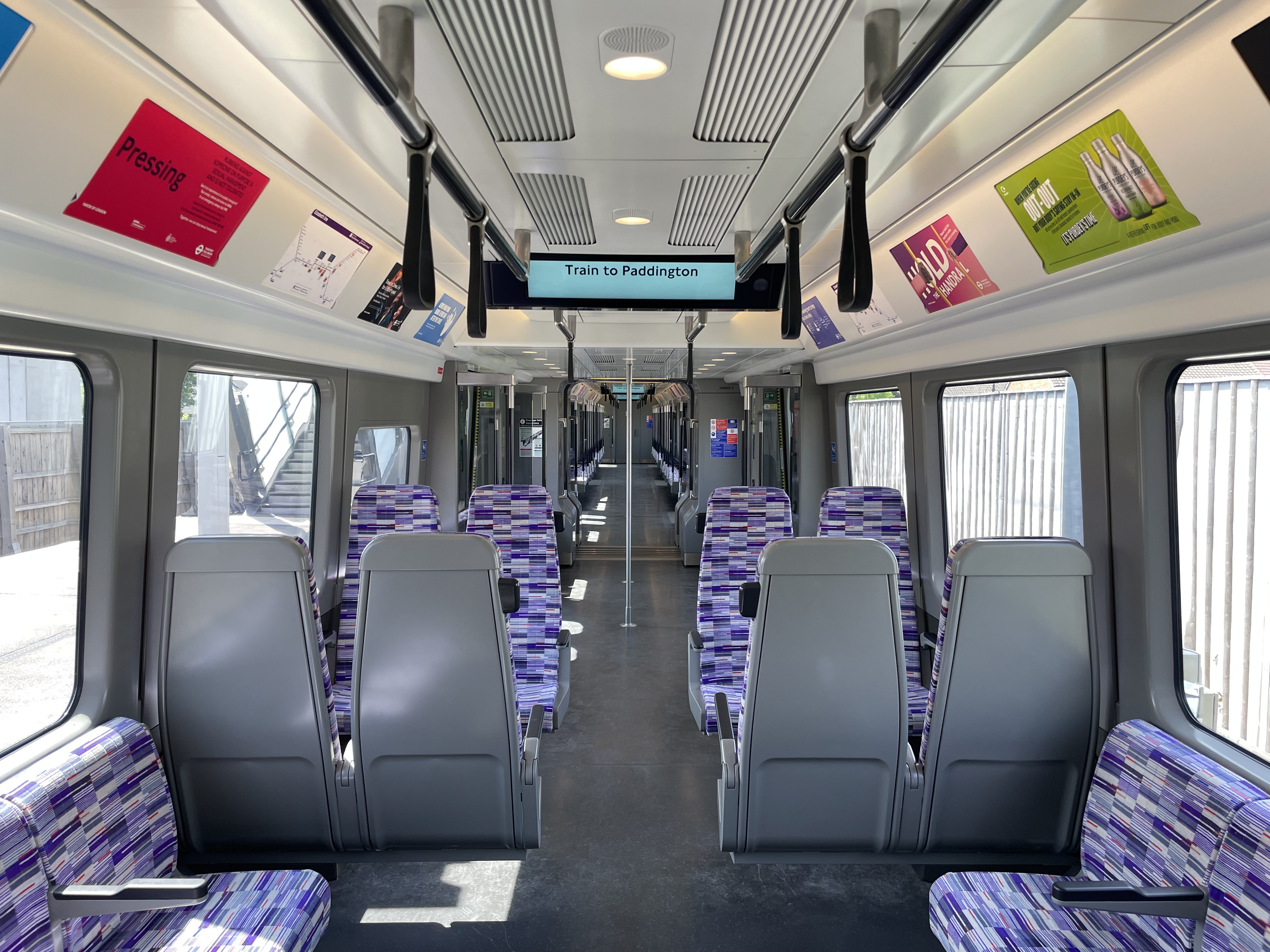
- Interior of a Class 345 unit
- In service: 22 June 2017 – present
- Manufacturers: Bombardier Transportation; Alstom
- Built at: Derby Litchurch Lane Works
- Family name: Aventra
- Replaced: Class 315; Class 360
- Constructed: 2015–2019 (first batch); 2025–present (second batch)
- Number under construction: 10
- Number built: 70
- Formation: 9 cars per unit (See § Fleet details)
- Fleet numbers: 345001–345070
- Capacity: 1500 total (454 seated, 1046 standing)
- Owner: 345 Rail Leasing
- Operators: Current: GTS Rail Operations; Former: MTR Elizabeth line; TfL Rail
- Depots: Ilford EMU (London); Old Oak Common (London)
- Lines served: GEML (Liverpool Street to Shenfield); GWML (Paddington to Heathrow and Reading); Elizabeth line (Paddington to Abbey Wood and Stratford)

Specifications
- Car body construction: Aluminium, with steel cabs
- Train length: 204.73 m (671 ft 8 in)
- Car length: DM vehs.: 23.615 m (77 ft 5.7 in); Others: 22.500 m (73 ft 9.8 in)
- Width: 2.772 m (9 ft 1.1 in)
- Height: 3.760 m (12 ft 4.0 in)
- Floor height: 1.145 m (3 ft 9.1 in)
- Doors: Double-leaf sliding plug, each 1.450 m (4 ft 9.1 in) wide (3 per side per car)
- Wheel diameter: 825–750 mm (32.5–29.5 in) (new–worn)
- Wheelbase: Per bogie: 2.25 m (7 ft 5 in); Over bogie centres: 16.00 m (52 ft 6 in)
- Maximum speed: 90 mph (145 km/h)
- Weight: 319 tonnes (314 long tons; 352 short tons)
- Traction system: IGBT–VVVF
- Traction motors: 20 × 250 kW (340 hp) (2 per powered bogie)
- Power output: 4,400 kW (5,900 hp) (at rail)
- Acceleration: 1 m/s^{2} (3.3 ft/s^{2})
- Electric system: 25 kV 50 Hz AC overhead
- Current collection: Pantograph
- UIC classification: 2′Bo′+2′Bo′+Bo′Bo′+2′Bo′+2′2′+Bo′2′+Bo′Bo′+Bo′2′+Bo′2′
- Bogies: Bombardier FLEXX Eco 5011
- Braking systems: Electro-pneumatic (disc) and regenerative
- Safety systems: AWS; CBTC (Siemens Trainguard); ETCS; TPWS
- Coupling system: Dellner
- Track gauge: 1,435 mm (4 ft 8 1/2 in) standard gauge

Notes/references
- Sourced from unless otherwise noted.

The British Rail Class 345 Aventra is a fleet of electric multiple unit passenger trains built by Bombardier Transportation (now Alstom) for use on London's Elizabeth line. Part of Bombardier's Aventra family of trains, the contract for their delivery was awarded as part of the Crossrail project in February 2014. A total of 70 nine-car units – each able to carry 1,500 passengers – were constructed in Derby between 2015 and 2019, at a cost of over £1 billion. The first unit entered service on 22 June 2017.

A further ten units were ordered in June 2024, for delivery in 2026, which will take the total fleet size to 80.

== History ==
=== Background and specifications ===
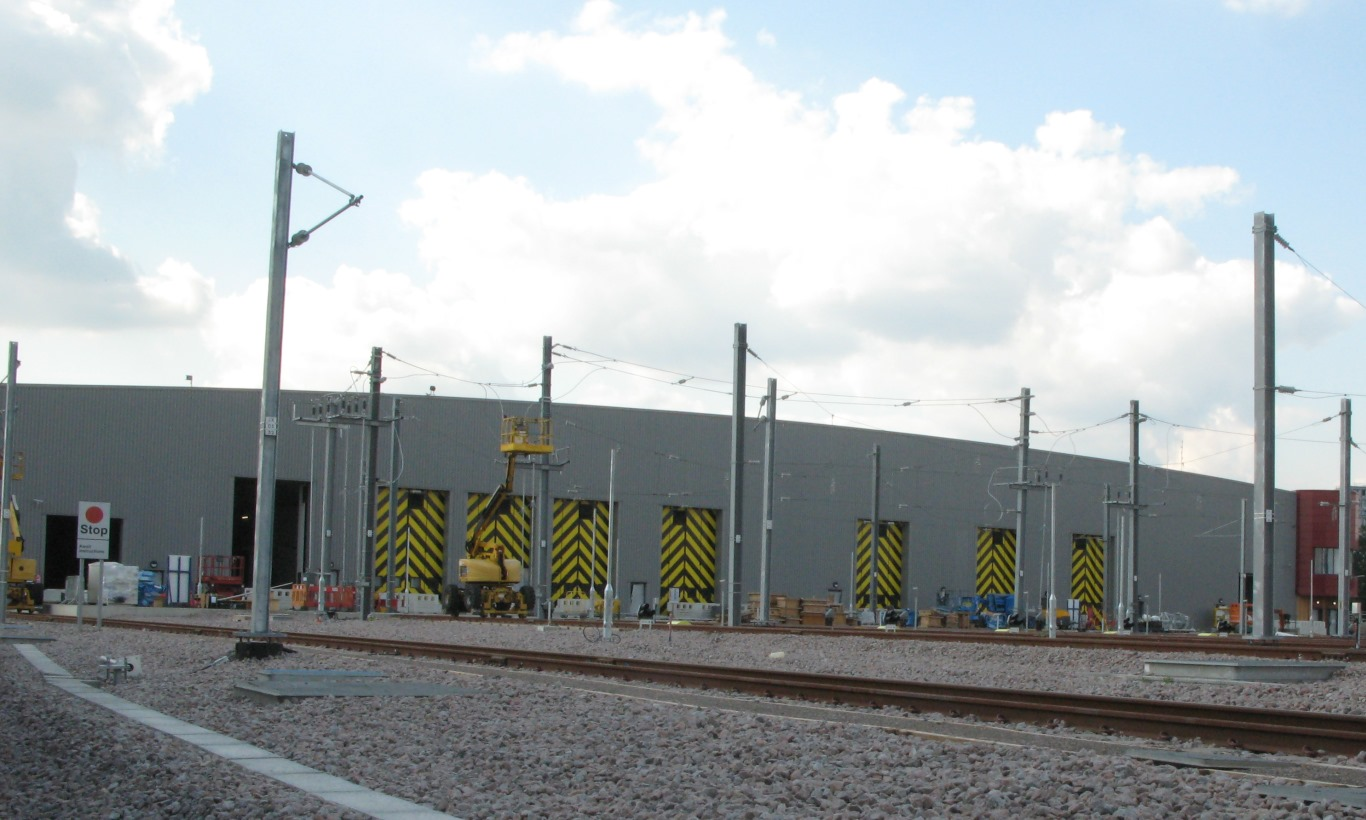
The depot built for Class 345s at Old Oak Common

In 2008, the British government's rolling stock plan stated a requirement for around 610 carriages for Crossrail, expected to be similar in design to the Thameslink rolling stock, to meet the design improvement requirements of the 2007 "Rail Technical Strategy" (RTS), including in-cab signalling/communication with satellite and European Train Control System level 3 technologies, regenerative braking, low cost of operation and high reliability, with low weight and high acceleration.

The publicly released specifications included a passenger capacity of 1,500, with 450 seated, in a fully air-conditioned train no longer than 205 m (672 ft 7 in) with a top speed of 145 km/h (90 mph), and an energy efficiency as good as 24 kWh per train-km. Tests on the finished trains indicate that the energy efficiency target has been exceeded, with the Class 345 consuming only 14 kWh per train-km. The trains work with platform screen doors in the central tunnel section. The capital value of the contract, which included construction of a depot at Old Oak Common, was estimated at around £1bn. The total value may be greater due to the winning bidder being expected to undertake maintenance of the trains for three decades, the estimated lifespan of the fleet.

=== Bidding process and funding ===
In March 2011, Crossrail announced that Alstom, Bombardier, CAF, Hitachi and Siemens had been shortlisted. The initial bidding process was expected to start in late 2011, with a contract decision in 2013.

In August 2011, the invitation to tender was delayed by one year to 2012 and the contract decision to 2014, with the introduction of trains on the Great Eastern Main Line expected from May 2017 (previously December 2016), with a correspondingly shortened production schedule. The delay was a cost-saving measure to avoid new vehicles being unused whilst Crossrail tunnelling was completed; it also postponed bidding until after a review of governmental procurement processes. Alstom withdrew from the bidding process in August 2011, stating it lacked a suitable developed product. Concerns about taxpayer value for money on PFI funded projects led to Transport for London (TfL) seeking to purchase the trains outright. In December 2011, the request to raise the debt ceiling at TfL to allow the acquisition with public funds was refused by the Department for Transport (DfT).

In February 2012, an invitation to negotiate was issued, which included clauses on 'responsible procurement' relating to UK supply chain sourcing and training opportunities; the procurement became politicised after Bombardier failed to win the Thameslink rolling stock contract, and said it might have to close its UK assembly plant (Derby Litchurch Lane, at the time the only operational rolling stock manufacturer in the UK) if it did not win the Crossrail contract.

Formal bids were expected during mid-2012, with a decision in early 2014, based on the proposed product meeting the design requirements, and on value for money. Procurement was expected to be partly public and partly privately financed. In September 2012, the government announced that it would underwrite a further £240 million of the project cost under its 'UK Guarantees' infrastructure credit funding scheme, in addition to the 30 per cent of the project being government funded. Siemens withdrew from the tendering process in July 2013, citing a likelihood of insufficient production capacity in the production timeframe.

=== Contract award and construction ===
In December 2013, the European Investment Bank (EIB) agreed to provide loans to TfL for the rolling stock of up to £500 million. On 6 February 2014, it was announced that Bombardier Transportation had been awarded a £1bn contract to supply 65 trains, with an option for 18 more. The trains were constructed at Bombardier's Derby Litchurch Lane Works, with testing scheduled to begin in May 2016. On 29 July 2016, the first completed train was unveiled by Bombardier and TfL at Litchurch Lane.

In March 2018, an option for five more units was exercised, taking the order to 70 units.

==== Second batch ====
Following the opening of the Elizabeth line, TfL has experienced high passenger growth on the line. TfL noted that extra capacity would be required when Old Oak Common railway station opens in the 2030s alongside the opening of High Speed 2. TfL therefore pushed for funding from the DfT for additional trains. Alstom (who acquired Bombardier in January 2021) and the Unite the Union also lobbied for an additional order, as the lack of train orders nationally had put Alstom's Derby Litchurch Lane plant at risk of closure. In June 2024, a £370 million contract for ten additional nine-car trains (and maintenance of them until 2046) was signed, with the DfT contributing £220.5 million. In October 2025, production began on the second batch of units, with all trains planned to be in service by 2027. By June 2026, the first train had been completed, and testing was underway. The first train of the second batch entered service in August 2026.

=== Sale and leaseback ===
In January 2018, it was proposed that the fleet would be sold by TfL and leased back in order to provide funding for the London Underground 2024 Stock. This £1bn, twenty-year, sale-and-leaseback deal was agreed in March 2019 with NatWest, SMBC Leasing and Equitix.

== Operations ==
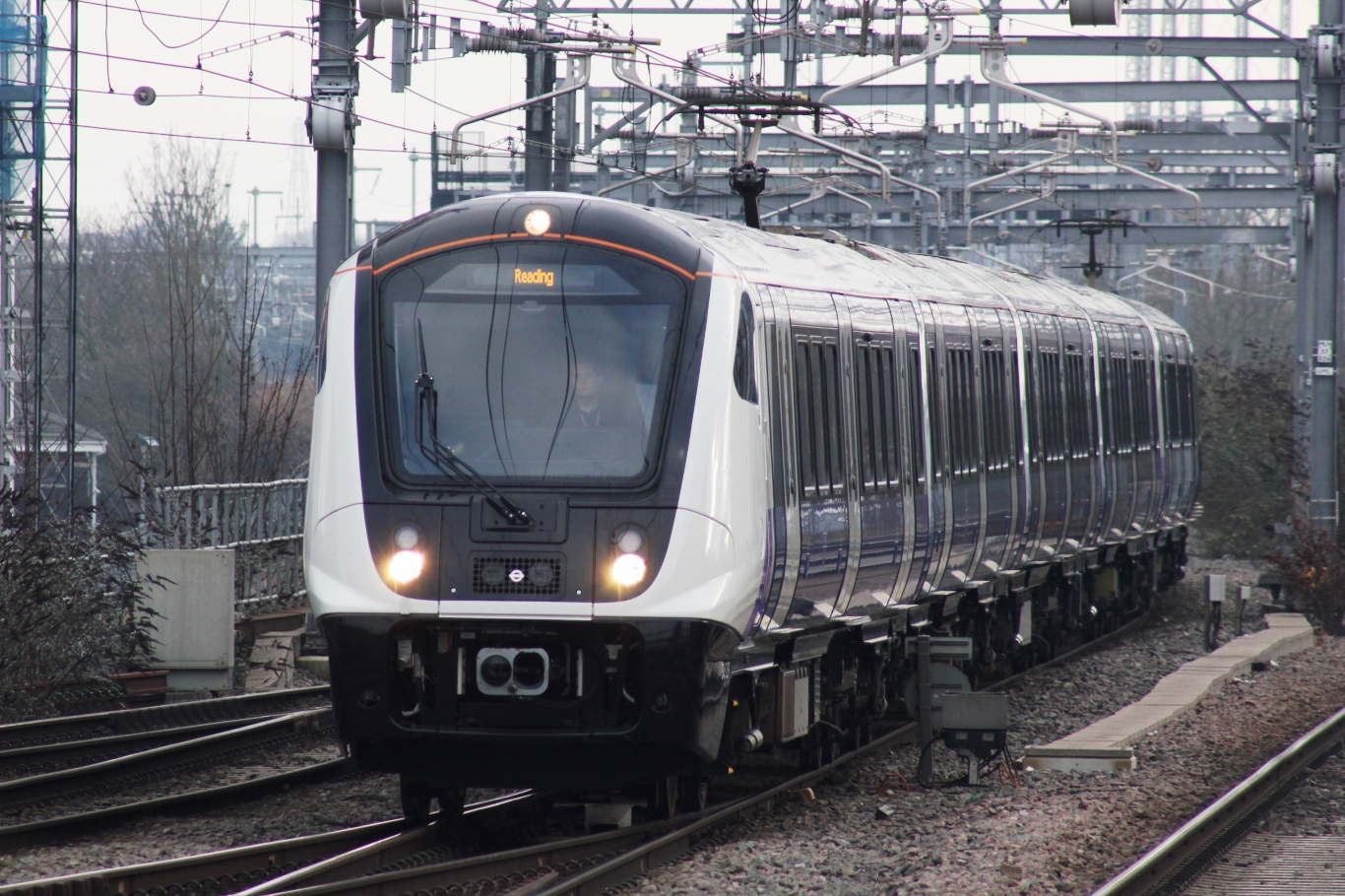
TfL Rail Class 345 approaching Reading

The first train entered service on 22 June 2017 on the eastern TfL Rail route between London Liverpool Street and Shenfield as a seven-car unit. The complete nine-car sets could not be accommodated at the Liverpool Street termini until platforms were lengthened in 2021.

The trains entered service on the western TfL Rail route between London Paddington and Hayes & Harlington in May 2018, before running to Reading by December 2019. Trains on the western route were initially delivered in seven-car formation, then progressively converted into full nine-car units.

The new trains wholly replaced the Class 315 units previously used on TfL Rail services to Shenfield, and predominantly replaced the Class 387s of Great Western Railway on services to Reading, as well as wholly replacing the Class 360s of the former Heathrow Connect on services to Heathrow. The trains have free Wi-Fi and 4G available, as well as being fully accessible for wheelchair users.

In May 2020, the Office of Rail and Road (ORR) authorised Class 345 operation into Heathrow Terminals 2 & 3, Heathrow Terminal 4 and Heathrow Terminal 5. Operation began on 30 July 2020. On 24 May 2022, the trains began service in the central core section as the Elizabeth line. Trains were rebranded from TfL Rail to Elizabeth line for the start of service.

In the central core of the Elizabeth line, the trains drive automatically using communications-based train control (Siemens Trainguard), with the driver operating the doors and starting the train. In the outer surface sections of the Elizabeth line, the train uses existing signalling systems on Network Rail tracks. At Paddington and Abbey Wood, the train is able to turn around automatically without passengers on board while the driver walks through the train to the other cab, ready to operate the train in the opposite direction.

== Fleet details ==
The 70 built units are formed from a total of 630 carriages. Like many other contemporary designs for commuter rolling stock, the trains feature open gangways between carriages. There are no toilets on board. Trains have a mix of longitudinal and transverse seating, all of which is standard class.

Class	Operator	Qty.	Year built	Cars per unit	Unit nos.	Formation
345	GTS Rail Operations	70	2015–2019	9	345001–345070	DMS-PMS-MS1-MS3-TSW-MS3-MS2-PMS-DMS
345	GTS Rail Operations	10	2025–	9	345071–345080	TBA

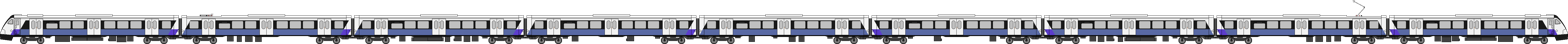
Illustration of an Elizabeth line Class 345 unit

== Named units ==
The following units have received names.

Elizabeth line Class 345 units with special names or liveries
Unit number	Name	Notes
Named trains
345004	Andy Byford	Named after former Commissioner of Transport for London Andy Byford.
345024	Heidi Alexander	Named after Deputy Mayor of London Heidi Alexander, who served on the Crossrail board.
345062	Jorge Ortega	Named after MTR Elizabeth line worker Jorge Ortega, who died after being attacked at Ilford station.
Special liveries
345055	Every Story Matters	Pride livery for the 2023 Pride in London event

== See also ==
- Class 700, a fleet of units procured from Siemens Mobility for the Thameslink Programme, to a broadly similar specification.
- Class 710, a similar fleet of Aventra units used on the London Overground.
