= Hayes & Harlington railway station =

National Rail station in London, England

Hayes & Harlington
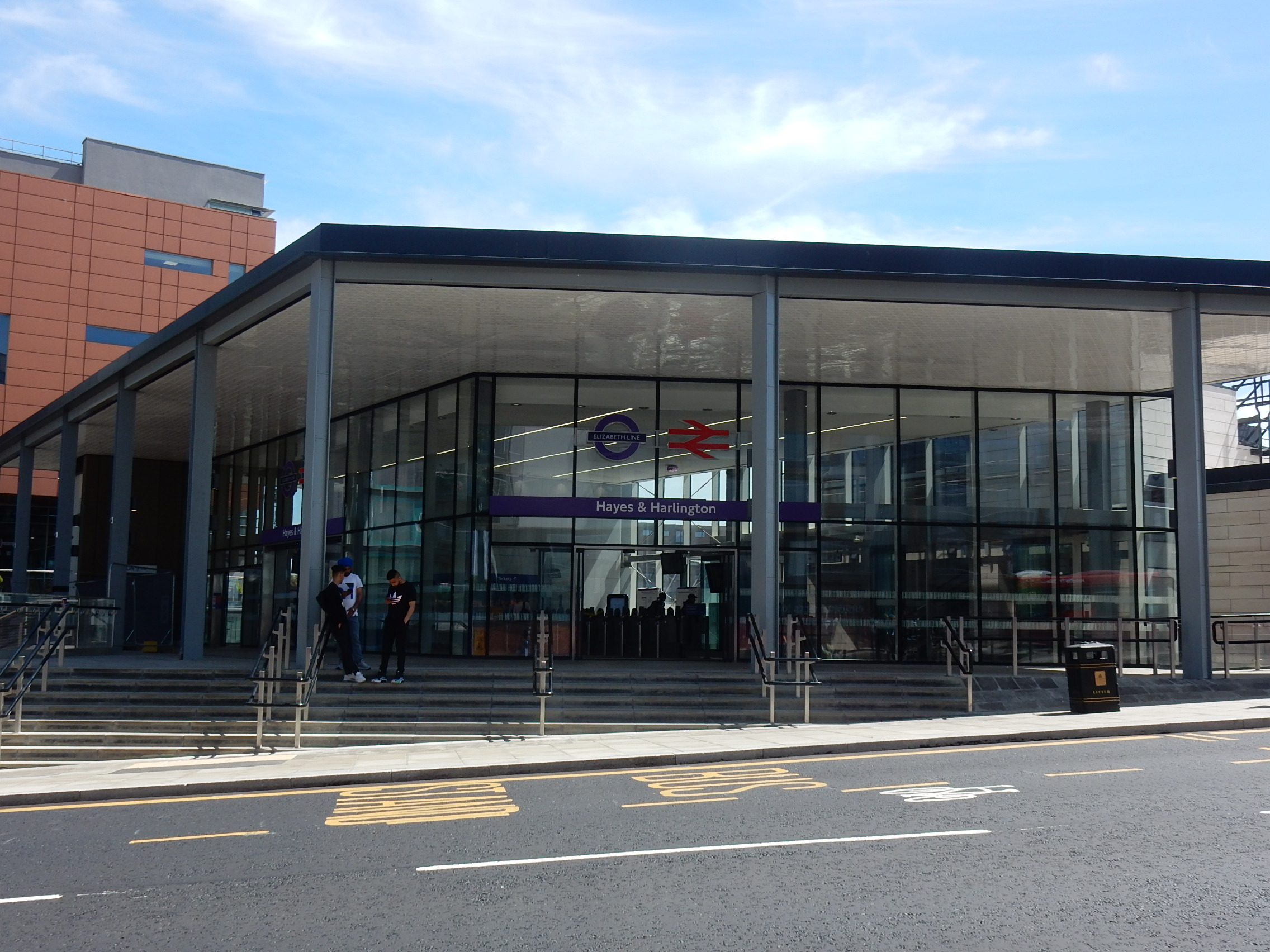
- Station entrance seen in May 2022
- Interactive map of Hayes & Harlington

General information
- Location: Hayes
- Local authority: London Borough of Hillingdon
- Managed by: Elizabeth line
- Owner: Network Rail
- Station code: HAY
- DfT category: D
- Number of platforms: 5
- Accessible: Yes
- Fare zone: 5

National Rail annual entry and exit
- 2020–21: ▼1.355 million
- Interchange: ▼22,200
- 2021–22: ▲3.169 million
- Interchange: ▲52,734
- 2022–23: ▲5.446 million
- Interchange: ▲0.120 million
- 2023–24: ▲7.765 million
- Interchange: ▲0.150 million
- 2024–25: ▲8.450 million
- Interchange: ▲0.187 million

Other information
- External links: Departures; Facilities
- Coordinates: 51.502°N 0.4201°W

Hayes & Harlington is a railway station serving the west London districts Hayes and Harlington in the London Borough of Hillingdon. It is in London fare zone 5, 10 miles 71 chains (17.5 km; 10.89 mi) down the line from London Paddington and is situated between Southall and West Drayton.

It has long operated as a minor stop on the Great Western Main Line and is at the start of a spur to Heathrow Airport, to and from which passenger trains operate since the early 21st-century building of the spur which benefits from a flyover junction.

The station is managed by the Elizabeth line, with most services also provided by the Elizabeth line, and late night services provided by the Great Western Railway.

== History ==
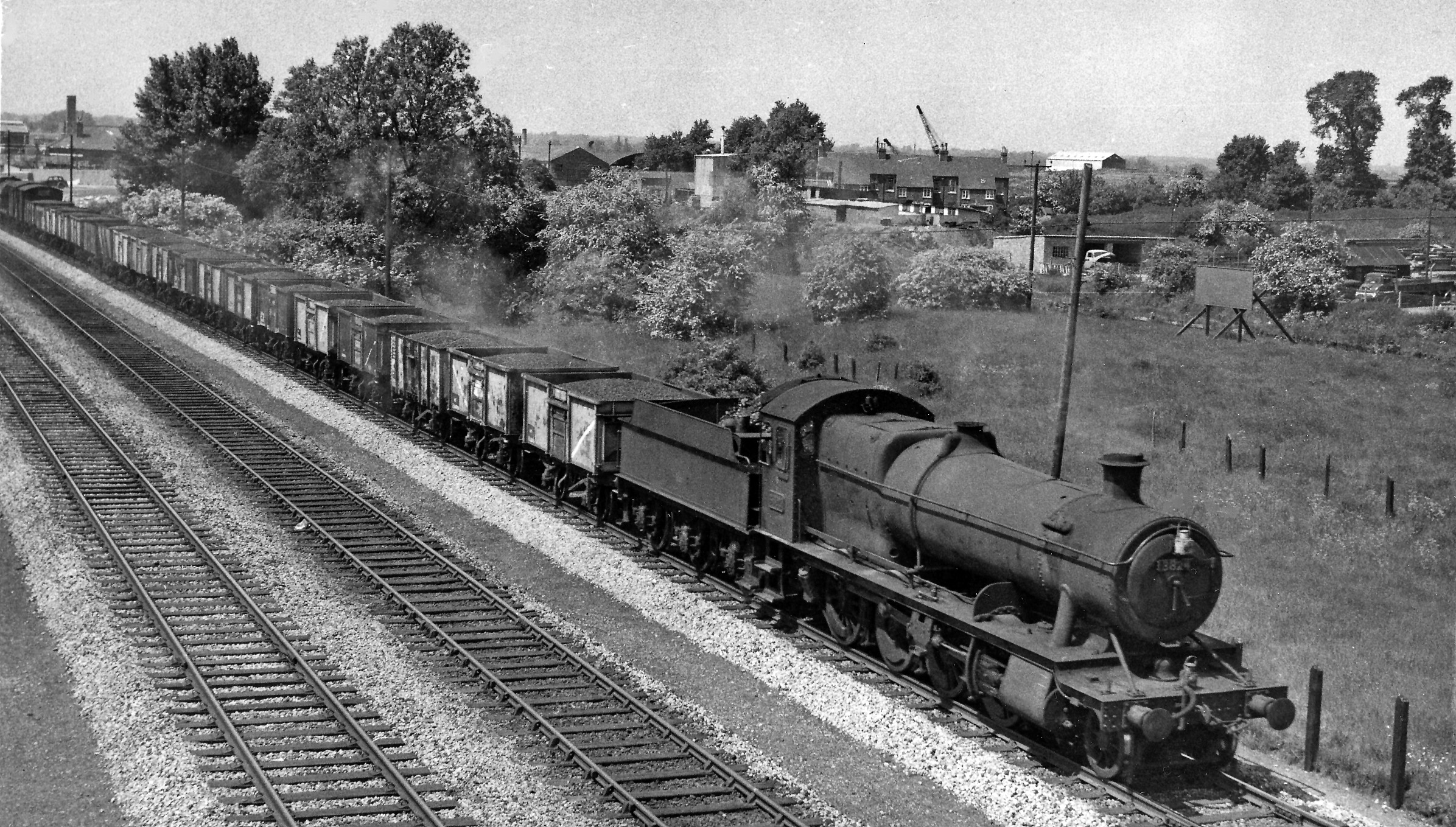
Up freight west of Hayes & Harlington in 1962

The station is on the Isambard Kingdom Brunel-designed Great Western Main Line landscaped and laid from London Paddington to major towns in central and west Berkshire, Bristol, South Wales and with later direct additions to Birmingham and Taunton. The line was opened piecemeal; its first guise terminated on 4 June 1838 at a temporary Maidenhead station in Taplow to allow completion of the single-span brick high-level sounding arch over the Thames just west of that temporary halt. The station at Hayes opened in 1868 or 1864.

From 1 March 1883, the station (then named Hayes) was served by District Railway services running between Mansion House and Windsor (central). The service was discontinued as uneconomic on 30 September 1885.

The film Trains at Hayes Station, showing trains passing through the station with stereophonic sound, was filmed from the roof of the defunct Aeolian pianola factory just north of the station. The factory had been purchased by the Gramophone Company when the pianola company had collapsed owing to fraud and technological obsolescence. The film is almost the first demonstration of stereophonic sound to accompany moving pictures, an invention of Alan Blumlein.

The booking office was replaced in 1961 with a building to a modern design erected on a concrete raft over the line.

== Description ==
The station has five platforms, four being through platforms and one being a terminus bay platform. Platforms 1 and 2 are only used during certain engineering works and during disruption on the relief lines; 3 and 4 are for services (which are stopping services) to and from London, Heathrow Airport, Reading and Oxfordshire; platform 5 is a bay terminus platform, which was used for half-hourly shuttle services to Paddington. Platform 5 is capable of holding an eight-car train; platforms 2, 3 and 4 can hold nine-car trains and platform 1 can hold five-car trains. Platforms 3 and 4 have been extended as part of Crossrail improvement works. All platforms are connected with a footbridge to the new station building as part of the new Crossrail station improvements, which include step-free access to all platforms, step-free access to Station Road and Station Approach/High Point Village. All lines at Hayes & Harlington are electrified.

=== Airport Junction ===
Airport junction adjoins the station the junction of the short Heathrow Airport branch. For this reason, the lines through the station are electrified with 25 kilovolt A.C. overhead power from London Paddington to the airport – the main line to Reading has been electrified by c. early 2018 as part of a project to modernise the main line.

The junction itself, west of the station, consists of two high-speed turnouts from the main lines, the 'down' (away from London) line curving away to the left towards the Airport and the 'up' (towards London) line passing over a concrete flyover to clear (flyover) the up and down main lines. The construction permits London-bound electric trains to join the main line at the same time as westbound expresses serve the down main line.

== Services ==
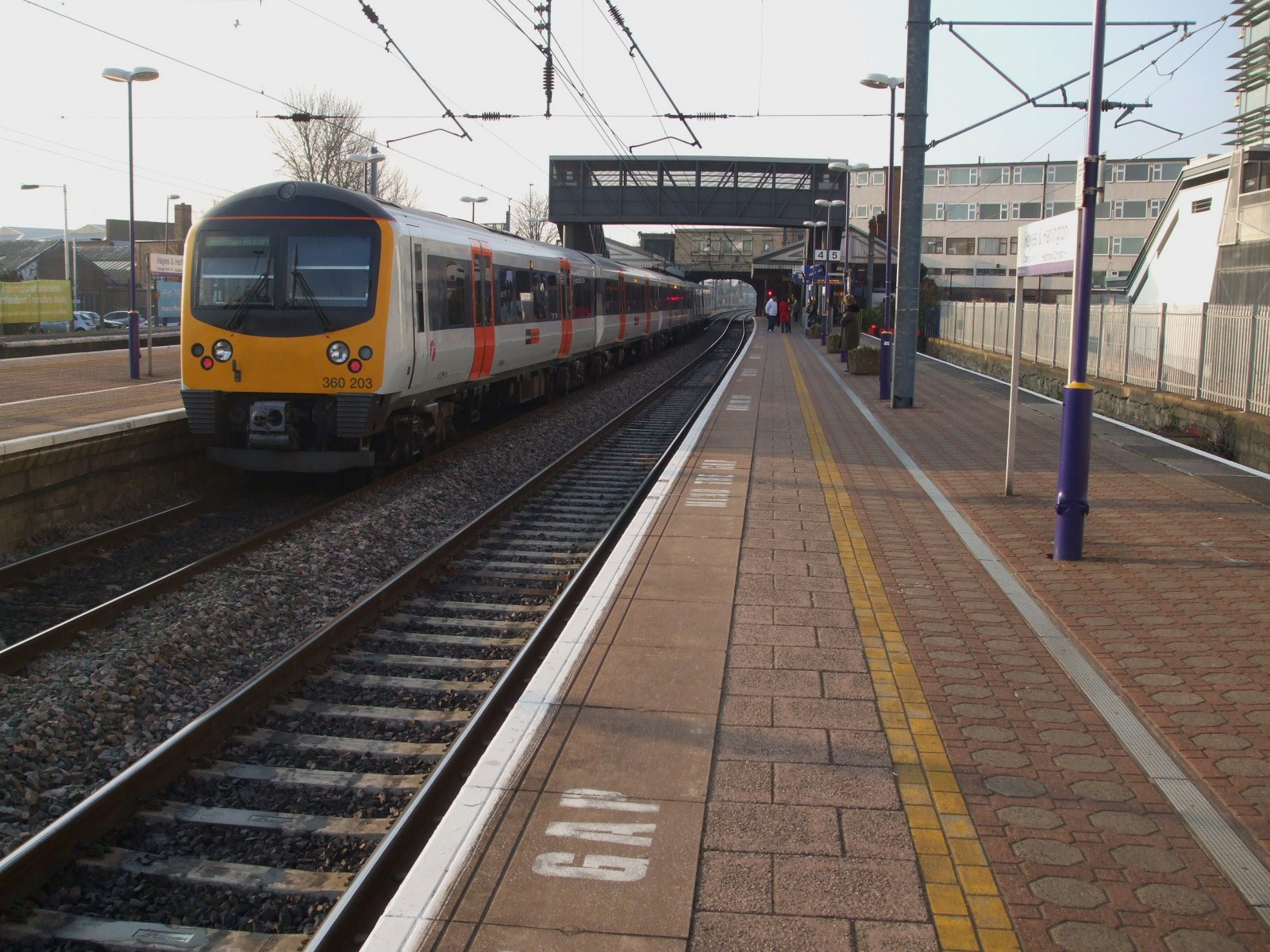
A Heathrow Connect British Rail Class 360 at Hayes & Harlington in 2008

=== Frequency ===
As of the May 2023 timetable, the typical Monday to Friday off-peak Elizabeth line service is:

- 4 tph (trains per hour) westbound to Heathrow Terminal 4
- 2 tph westbound to Heathrow Terminal 5
- 2 tph westbound to Reading
- 2 tph westbound to Maidenhead
- 2 tph eastbound to Shenfield
- 8 tph eastbound to Abbey Wood

Late night services are operated by the Great Western Railway, running westbound to Reading and Didcot Parkway, and eastbound to Paddington.

Oyster "pay as you go" as well as contactless can be used for journeys originating or ending at Hayes & Harlington.

=== Service table ===
Preceding station	Elizabeth line	Following station
Heathrow Terminals 2 & 3 towards Heathrow Airport Terminal 4 or Terminal 5	Elizabeth line	Southall towards Abbey Wood or Shenfield
West Drayton towards Reading	Elizabeth line	Southall towards Abbey Wood
Preceding station	National Rail	Following station
West Drayton	Great Western Railway; Late night services Great Western Main Line	Southall
Historical railways
Preceding station	London Underground	Following station
West Drayton towards Windsor	District line	Southall towards Mansion House

=== Upgrades for the Elizabeth line ===
Various alterations were made by Network Rail to prepare the station for Elizabeth line services:

- New station building
- Four new lifts to provide step-free access
- Platforms 1–4 extended
- New 220-yard (200 m) bay platform 5 constructed (replacing existing bay)
- New platform canopies to platform 4 and 5
- Track work to widen the island platform 2 and 3 and to provide access to the new bay platform

== Locale ==
Harlington is a green-buffered enlarged village whose south is the Bath Road which has major hotels as part of a cluster of Heathrow Airport Hotels the settlement merges into Hayes in the north which has two retail/regular commercial centres, the closer High Street area immediately adjoins the station and continues due north, a similar further hub is the Uxbridge Road found 1 1/2 miles (2.4 km) further to the north.

== Connections ==
London Buses routes 90, 140, 195, 278, 350, E6, H98, SL9, U4 and U5, school routes 696 and 698, and night route N140 serve the station.
