= Old Oak Common Depot =

Former railway traction maintenance depot in West London

Old Oak Common TMD
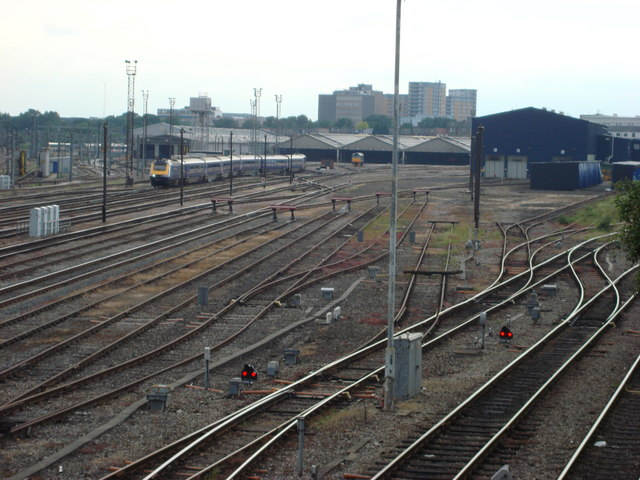
- First Great Western InterCity 125 leaving empty stock for service to London Paddington.
- Interactive map of Old Oak Common TMD

Location
- Location: London, United Kingdom
- Coordinates: 51.5249°N 0.2467°W
- OS grid: TQ216822

Characteristics
- Owner: Network Rail; HS2 ltd
- Depot code: OC (1973–); OH (Heathrow Express); OM (Carriage); OO (HST)
- Type: Diesel, HST, DMU, EMU

History
- Opened: 1906
- Closed: In stages from 1965 to 2021. Final closure & decommissioned February 2021
- Original: GWR
- Pre-grouping: GWR
- Post-grouping: GWR
- BR region: Western Region
- Former depot code: OOC; 81A (1948-1973)

Old Oak Common TMD was a traction maintenance depot located west of London Paddington, in Old Oak Common. The depot codes were OC for the diesel depot and OO for the carriage shed. In steam days the shed code was 81A.

The depot was formerly the main facility for the storage and servicing of locomotives and multiple-units from Paddington. However The 'HST' section of Old Oak Common TMD, more commonly known as 'Old Oak Common HST Depot' closed in 2018 with the removal of the InterCity 125s from services on the Great Western Main Line (GWML). This closure was to make way for the development of the HS2 project. Maintenance of the new InterCity Express Trains is carried out at North Pole IET Depot which is situated opposite the site of Old Oak Common TMD whilst the Night Riviera sleeper train was transferred to Penzance Long Rock Depot in December 2017.

A new depot was built approximately a 1/4 mile to the east of the existing depot, primarily to service and stable the Class 345 trains that have been ordered for the Elizabeth line part of the Crossrail project. The depot opened in May 2018 and took the name of the existing depot.

The area is also where two Great Western Railway main lines divide: the 1838 route to Reading via Slough, and the 1906 "New North Main Line" (present-day Acton–Northolt line) via Greenford to Northolt Junction, the start of the Great Western and Great Central Joint Railway line. The former is in use for regular passenger services; the latter is used overwhelmingly by freight trains and empty coaching stock movements.

== History ==
=== GWR ===
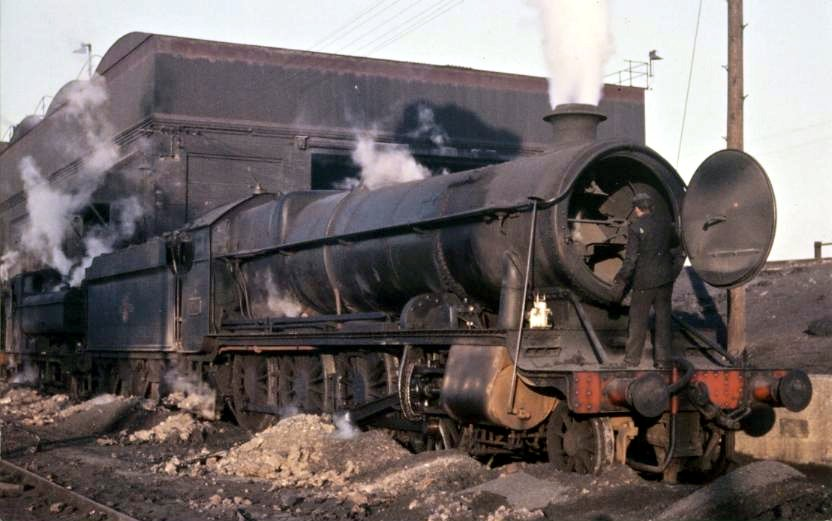
GWR 4700 Class 2-8-0 express freight loco 4706 being serviced at Old Oak Common on 15 December 1963

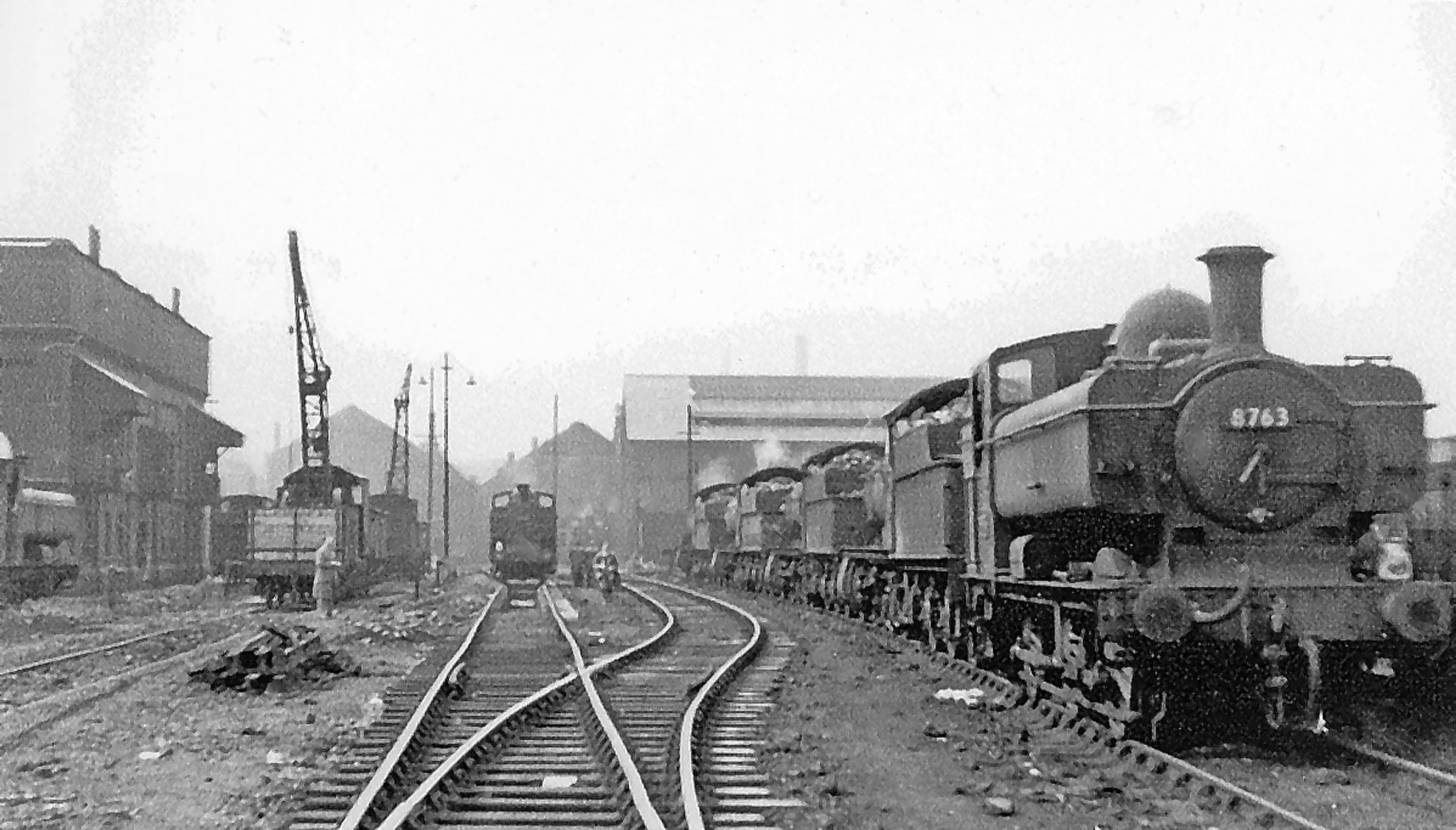
Steam locomotives near the coaling plant, September 1956

Following the reconstruction of Paddington station and the introduction of larger locomotives and new routes, the Great Western Railway (GWR) required a larger depot than that at the 1855 constructed Westbourne Park, at which to service its locomotives and carriages.

In 1901, a site was acquired in South Acton, south of the Grand Union Canal and on the upside of the mainline. Taking four years to layout and build, designed by G.J. Churchward, it was the largest depot on the entire GWR system, and set the pattern for similar depots throughout the GWR including Tyseley.

It had four 65 feet (19.8 m) undergirder turntables, under six-spans of east–west aligned northern-light pitched roofs. The shed covered a total area of 360 feet (110 m) (six bays of 60 by 444 feet or 18.3 by 135.3 metres} (six bays of 74 feet or 22.6 metres). The roofs were made of wood and steel rafters covered in Welsh slate tiles, supported on steel or cast iron columns, with solid London Brick Company walls. Laid out in an interconnecting 4-square pattern under the roof, each electrically operated turntable was fully boarded, and had 28 tracks spanning from it, able to accommodate locomotives up to 75 feet (22.9 m) in length.

The associated repair shop, termed The Factory, was allocated to the northeast front of the depot, with 11 roads approached over an electric traverser, and a 12th road direct from the depot throat. Built in a similar style to the depot, it was 195 feet (59 m) by 110 feet (34 m) in size, and housed a 30-long-ton (30.5 t; 33.6-short-ton) crane. There were also separate blacksmiths and carpenters workshops, a stores and a general office.

The approach to the shed housed a standard GWR pattern coal stage, again the largest on the system. It was approached via a 1:50 gradient brick-arch supported ramp, with 1:80 beyond the stage. In 1938, the approach roads to and from the coal stage were doubled, and in 1942 an ash shelter constructed to protect from Nazi Luftwaffe bombing. The four water tanks housed over the stage held 290,000 imperial gallons (1,300,000 L; 350,000 US gal) of water, while sand was supplied from a separate sand furnace.

The whole depot came into operation from 17 March 1906, and became the head of the GWR London operating division.

=== British Railways ===
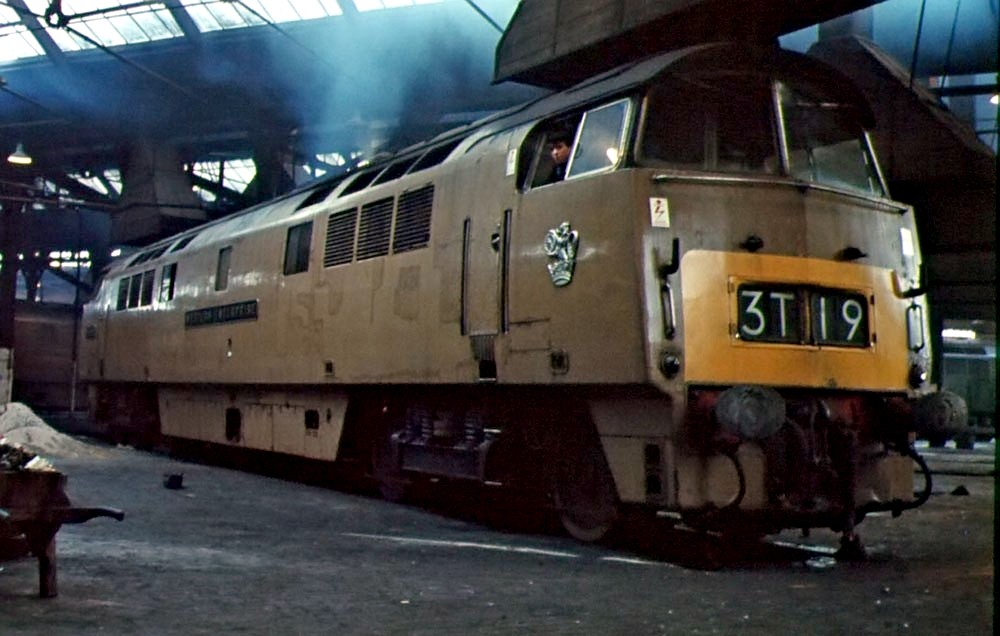
The first-of-class (Class 52) D1000 Western Enterprise, inside the roundhouse in 1964

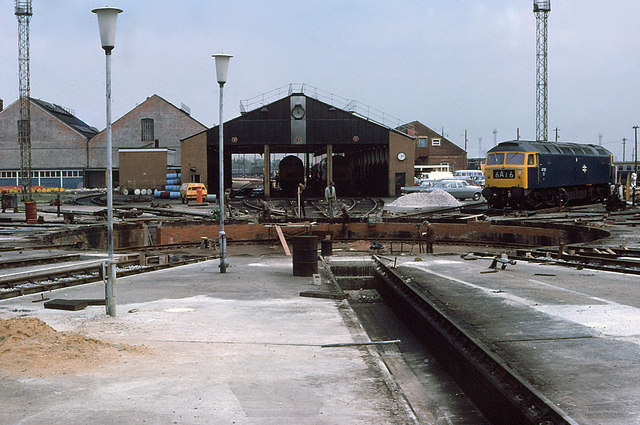
The former western turntable in 1980s looking east, with "The Factory" buildings to the rear

Throughout its GWR and early BR operational life, the depot remained fairly intact and similar to its original layout. The only major difference by the early 1960s was the addition of a pre-war diesel refuelling stage just north of the repair shop, for use by GWR railcars.

With a reduction in steam traction and the implementation of the Beeching cuts, in March 1964 the decision was taken to move the remaining steam locomotive allocation to the 1950s designed Southall MPD, and reconstruct Old Oak Common as a diesel depot. Within a year the majority of the GWR 1906 depot was demolished, with only "The Factory" repair shop, furthest western turntable and parts of the stores remaining. The main service building had 3 tracks, each holding two locos, with inspection pits, fuel supply points and a washing plant on the approach road. Some of the inspection pits in The Factory were also lengthened and deepened and jacks provided to allow for bogie and spring changing. It opened on 20 October 1965. It was the last of six big diesel depots built for the Western Region, the others being Margam TMD 1960, Bristol Bath Road depot 1960, Laira Traction Maintenance Depot, Plymouth, 1962, Landore TMD, Swansea, 1963 and Cardiff Canton TMD 1964.

Just south of the residual GWR buildings, in the 1960s BR built what was initially the storage depot for the Blue Pullman trains, what later became known as the Coronation Carriage Sidings. In the late 1970s, south of this and almost adjacent to the Great Western Main Line (GWML), BR built a depot for the new InterCity 125 fleet. Until December 2018 these serviced and maintained the Great Western Railway InterCity 125 fleet.

In 1997 a new bespoke depot was constructed at the southern end of the site, between the Great Western depot and the main line, funded by the British Airports Authority to service and maintain the Heathrow Express and later the Heathrow Connect service trains. This was the first new privately funded train depot in the UK since the British railways nationalisation in 1948. The inauguration of the Heathrow Express services saw the electrification of the GWML from Paddington to Hayes and onto Heathrow Airport using 25 kV overhead catenary.

On 26 July 2002, First Great Western opened a new depot on the site of the former carriage sidings to service its Class 180 fleet.

The residual GWR buildings were used from the 1970s to house and maintain singular diesel locomotives, special trains, and maintain carriages and freight stock in the area. On the privatisation of BR, the buildings were allocated to English Welsh & Scottish, and latterly operated by its commercial subsidiary Axiom Rail.

From 2000 onwards, developments were focused on the southern section of the former GWR site, either side of the 1970s BR High Speed Train depot. Added to in width, this allowed this part of the depot to service all Classes operated by Great Western Railway, Heathrow Express and Heathrow Connect. The allocation in 2004 was:

- Class 332 – four- and five-coach EMU used on Heathrow Express services.
- Class 360 – five-coach EMU used on Heathrow Connect services to Heathrow

By the end of 2009, from north to south, the site layout was:

- Residual 1905 GWR Factory buildings and northwestern turntable: EWS & Axiom Rail
- 1960's Coronation Carriage Sidings: GWR Class 180 Adelante
- 1970's Intercity 125: GWR 125 Intercity
- 1997 Depot: Heathrow Express Class 332 and Class 360
- GWR Mainline
- Northpole Depot - vacant

== Redevelopment ==
=== Depot ===
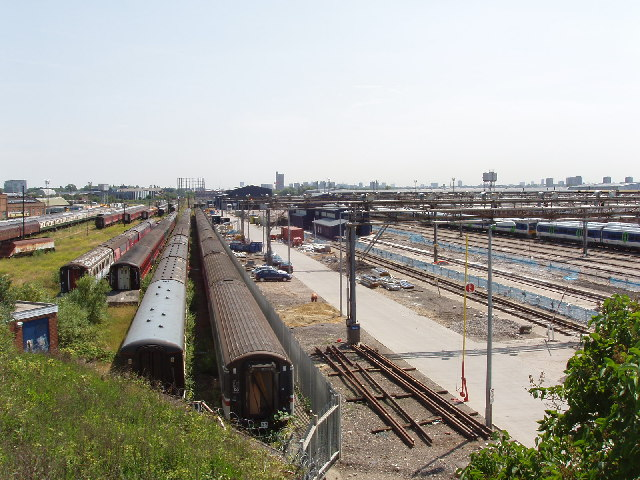
View from western end of depot in 2005, showing: (far left) residual GWR buildings; (left) Coronation Carriage Sidings; (centre) dividing fence; (right) Great Western Railway depot

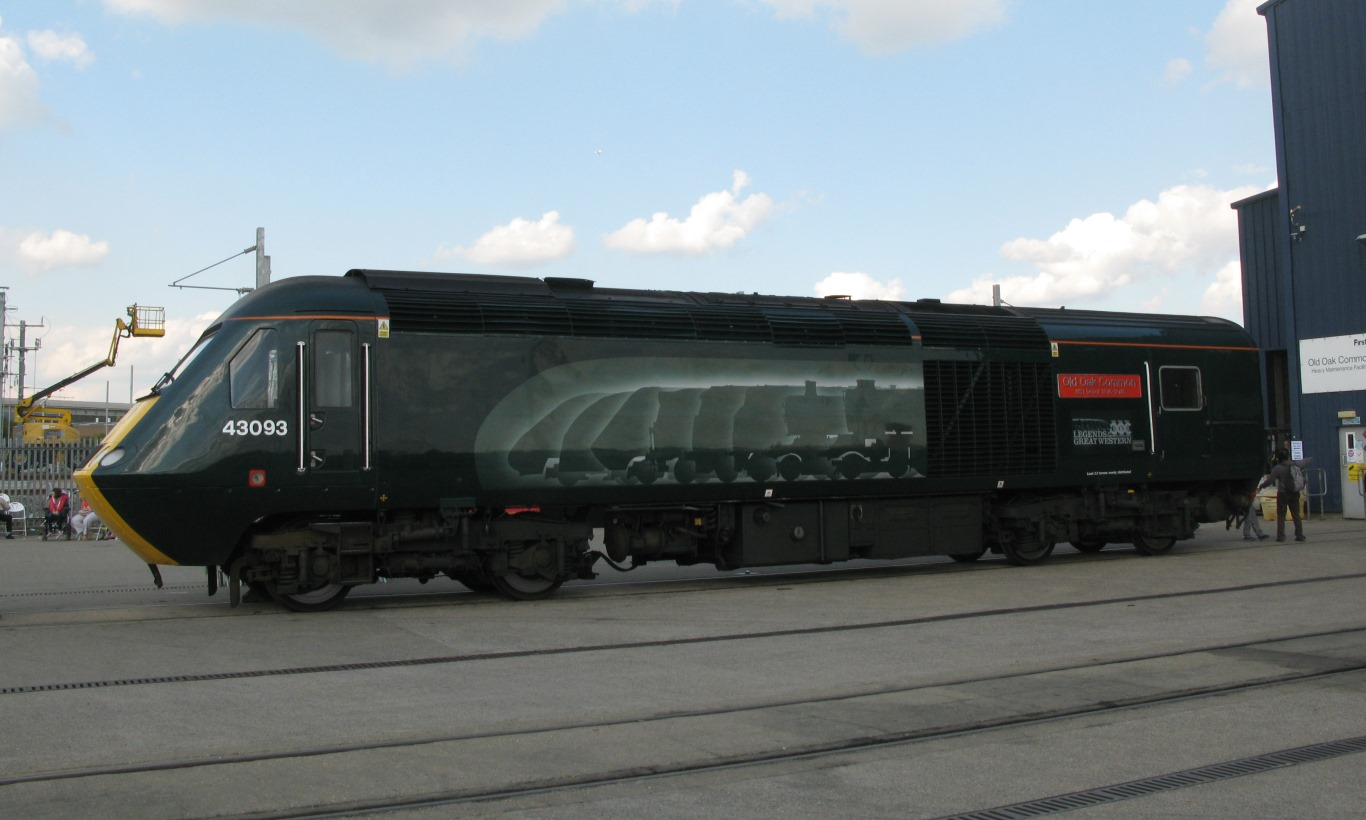
Powercar 43093 in the Legends of the Great Western livery at Old Oak Common depot, in September 2017

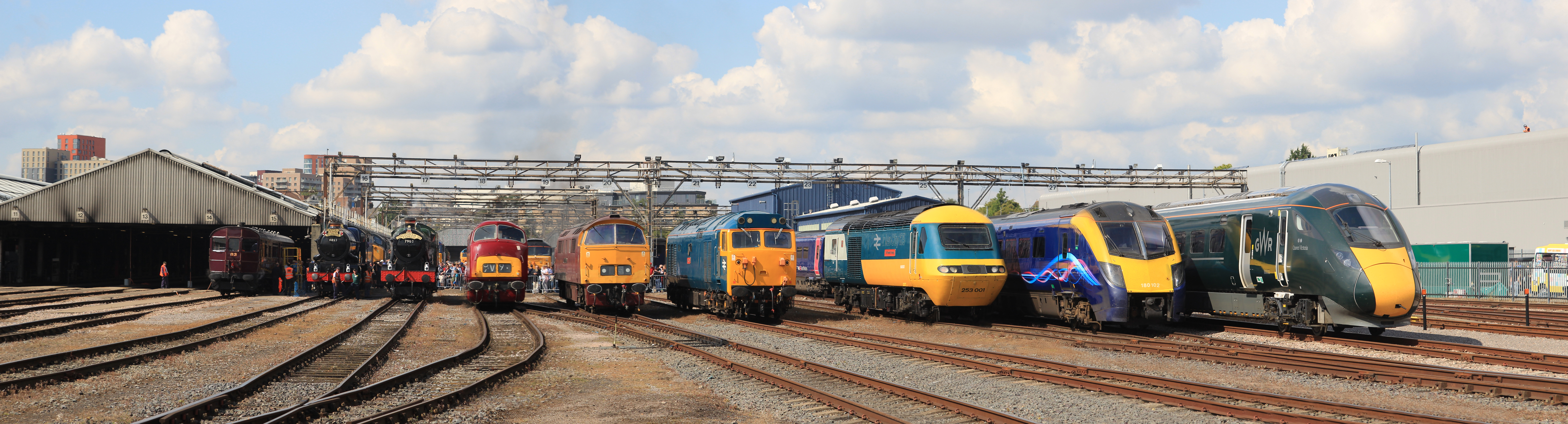
All eras of the Legends of the Great Western at Old Oak Common depot, in September 2017

In May 2009, EWS vacated their site. This part of the site, together with the adjacent Coronation Carriage Sidings was fenced off due to compulsory purchase for the Crossrail project. All the remaining GWR Factory buildings and the Coronation Carriage Sidings were demolished by mid-2011, with the former northwestern shed turntable donated to the Swanage Railway.

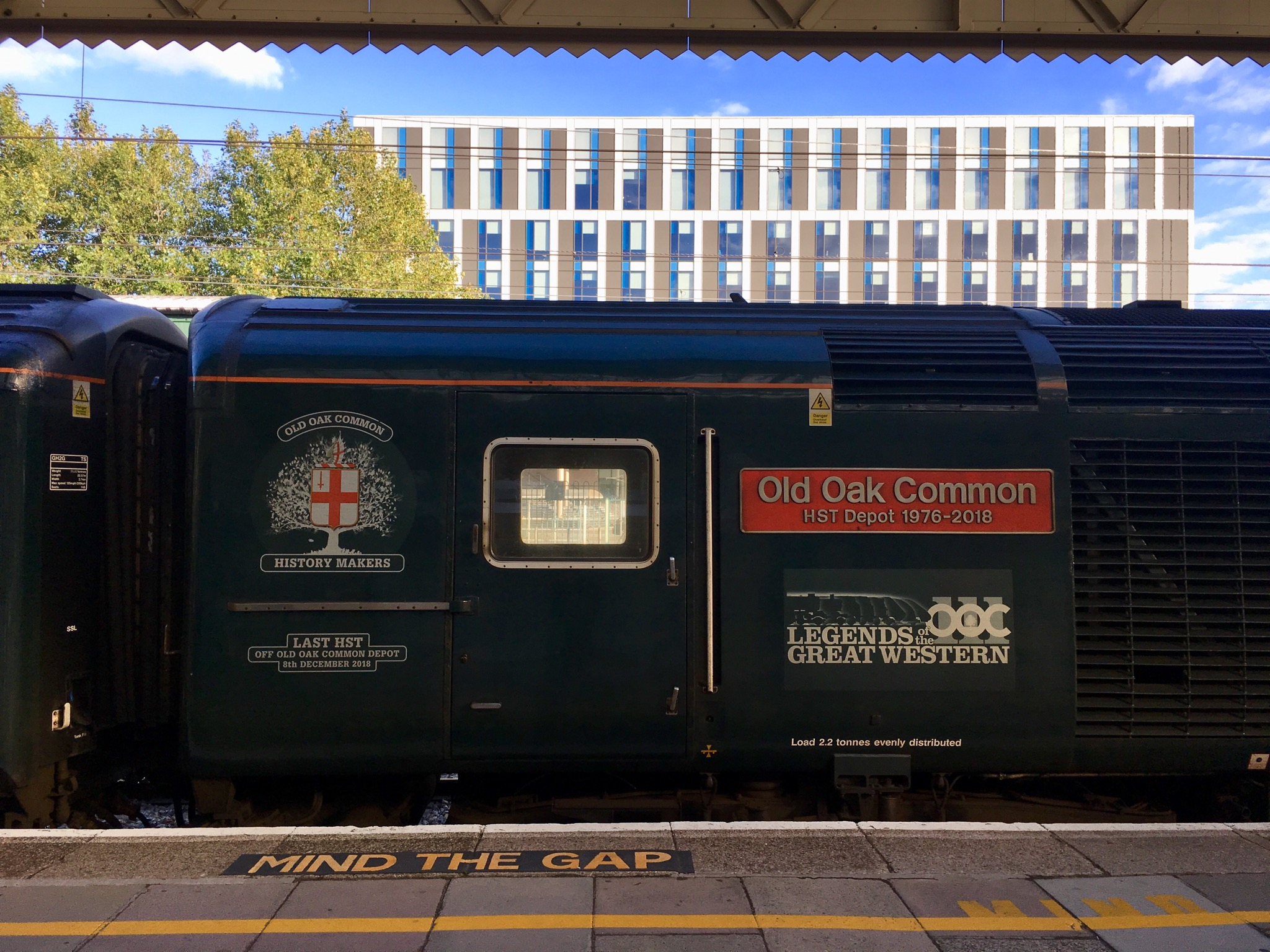
Powercar 43093 at Newport railway station, May 2020

From 2014 onwards, on the former EWS site and northern part of the former Coronation Sidings, a new depot was built by Taylor Woodrow Construction as part of the Crossrail project. Opening on 10 May 2018, it is equipped with stabling and nine maintenance roads. Operated by Alstom, it provides full servicing, maintenance and storage for the Class 345 trains which from operate between Reading on the GWML and Shenfield on the Great Eastern Main Line.

As a result of the development of the new HS2 station on the site, GWR phased-in a closure programme for its 125 Intercity Fleet depot. In December 2017, maintenance of the Night Riviera was transferred to Penzance Long Rock Depot with the stock laying over at Reading TMD at its northern end. The last HST to run from Old Oak Common ran from OOC to London Paddington station on 8 December 2018. A headboard was attached to the front power car, 43093, which said: "81A Old Oak Common LAST HST 8th December 2018". 43093 had already been named "Old Oak Common HST Depot 1978-2018" and was in the Legends of the Great Western Railway livery, but even more was added on this date; a logo which read "Old Oak Common History Makers" and another sign which read "Last HST off Old Oak Common Depot 8th December 2018".

The Heathrow Express EMU depot which had operated since 1997 maintaining the Class 332 fleet was the last part of Old Oak Common TMD to close following the withdrawal and scrapping of the Class 332 EMUs, closing in February 2021. It has since been demolished.

=== Old Oak Common Station ===
Old Oak Common railway station will open in 2026 as a major interchange station between the GWML, Elizabeth line, Heathrow Express and High Speed 2 line from London Euston to Birmingham, Manchester and Leeds.
