= Varan-TV =

Swedish TV series (1997–1998)

- Genre: comedy
- Country of origin: Sweden
- Original language: Swedish
- No. of seasons: 2
- No. of episodes: 14

Production
- Running time: 28 minutes

Original release
- Network: SVT 1
- Release: April 10, 1997 – October 22, 1998

Varan-TV was a Swedish TV comedy series, broadcast in Sveriges Television for two seasons, the first one in 1997 and the second in 1998. Created by the comedian group Varanteatern. The first season contained six half-hour episodes and the second season eight.

In the first season Varanteatern represented themselves as a "crazy peep-show with more than 400 kg on stage". The episodes were a mixture of sketches played in front of an audience and prerecorded clips. Both of these elements were closely connected, for example: One person acting in a prerecorded clip which was shown could in the next second appear on the scene set. Some characters could appear repeatedly during an episode and also reappear in other episodes. The second season was composed of different sketches but now without the studio scenes.

== Season one episode list ==
1. "Rollspel och sånt" ("Role-playing and stuff"), first aired on SVT1 on April 10, 1997, at 10 pm.
2. "Våld och sånt" ("Violence and stuff"), first aired on SVT1 on April 17, 1997, at 10 pm.
3. "Droger, religion och sånt" ("Drugs, religion and stuff"), first aired on SVT1 on April 24, 1997, at 10 pm.
4. "Idrott och sånt" ("Sports and stuff"), first aired on SVT1 on May 1, 1997, at 10 pm.
5. "Skitfin kultur och sånt" ("Damn nice culture and stuff"), first aired on SVT1 on May 8, 1997, at 10 pm.
6. "Afrika och sånt" ("Africa and stuff"), first aired on SVT1 on May 15, 1997, at 10 pm.

== Season two episode list ==
1. "En känsla av New York" ("A feeling of New York"), first aired on SVT1 on September 3, 1998, at 10 pm.
2. "En grävling på steroider" ("A badger on steroids"), first aired on SVT1 on September 10, 1998, at 10 pm.
3. "Märta från Bangladesh" ("Märta from Bangladesh"), first aired on SVT1 on September 17, 1998, at 10 pm.
4. "Då vill jag hälsa till den där Sting" ("Then I want to say hello to that Sting"), first aired on SVT1 on September 24, 1998, at 10 pm.
5. "En gris lös i stan" ("A pig is loose in the city"), first aired on SVT1 on October 1, 1998, at 10 pm.
6. "Nu har jag läst på Komvux, så nu vet jag vad det handlar om" ("Now I have studied at Komvux, so now I have an idea what it is all about"), first aired on SVT1 on October 8, 1998, at 10 pm.
7. "Trebarnsmamma från Angered knuffad i bankomatkö" ("Mother of three from Angered pushed in ATM line"), first aired on SVT1 on October 15, 1998, at 10 pm.
8. "Skräddaren säger nej" ("The tailor says no"), first aired on SVT1 on October 22, 1998, at 10 pm.

== Recurring acts ==
- Tyskarna från Lund
