= Trees for Life =

Trees for Life may refer to:

- Trees for Life (Scotland), a charity restoring the Caledonian Forest
- Trees for Life (United States), a non-profit organisation helping plant fruit trees in developing countries
- Trees For Life (Australia), a non-profit group dedicated to revegetation
