= Heathrow Connect =

Train service in London, 2005–2018

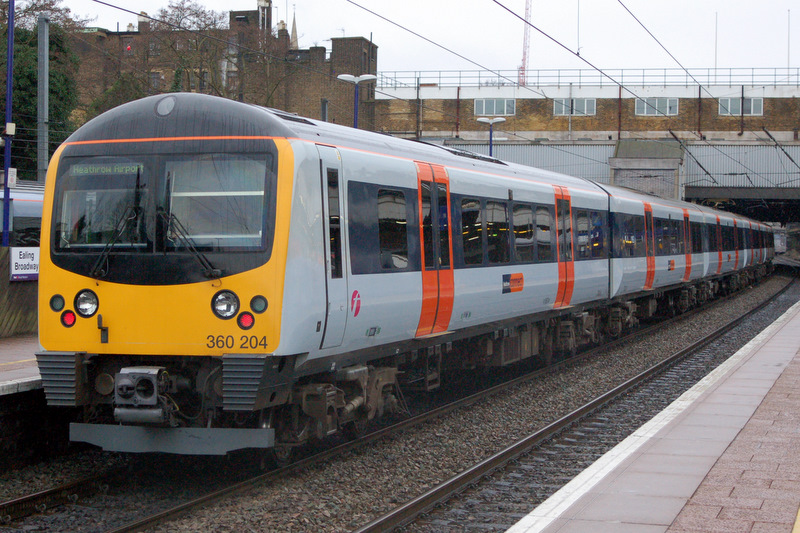
- Class 360 Desiro at Ealing Broadway in 2011

Overview
- Franchises: Open access operator Not subject to franchising 12 June 2005 - 19 May 2018
- Main route: London Paddington – Heathrow Airport Terminal 4
- Fleet: 5 Class 360s
- Stations called at: 8
- Parent company: Heathrow Airport Holdings; First Great Western
- Reporting mark: HC
- Successor: TfL Rail

Heathrow Connect was a train service in London provided jointly by Heathrow Express and Great Western Railway (GWR), between Paddington station and Heathrow Airport. The service followed the same route as the non-stop Heathrow Express service but called at certain intermediate stations, connecting several locations in West London with each other, the airport, and Central London. It ran every half-hour throughout the day and evening. The service was launched on 12 June 2005 and ceased on 19 May 2018, when it was absorbed into the TfL Rail concession, in advance of the service becoming operated by the Elizabeth line which opened on 24 May 2022.

== History ==
In the late 1990s, British Airports Authority (BAA) built an airport rail link from Heathrow Airport to London Paddington station. This opened in June 1998, with non-stop Heathrow Express trains taking just 15 minutes between Heathrow and Paddington.

In 2004, First Great Western Link and BAA (the operators of Heathrow Express) planned a stopping service between Heathrow and Paddington, using train paths previously occupied by stopping services from Slough. BAA spent £35 million on the project, including the purchase of five new Siemens Desiro Class 360 trains.

In June 2005, the Heathrow Connect branded stopping service between Heathrow and Paddington was launched. Although cheaper than Heathrow Express, the journey took around 25 minutes from Paddington, and ran less frequently. One benefit of the new service was that residents of West London (including airport staff) could reach the airport without needing to backtrack via Paddington. Trains were owned and operated by Heathrow Airport Holdings through Heathrow Express.

From the opening of Heathrow Terminal 5 in 2008, Heathrow Connect provided a shuttle service between Heathrow Central and Terminal 4 to connect with Heathrow Express.

In May 2018, the Heathrow Connect service was absorbed into TfL Rail ahead of the new Crossrail project. In May 2022, TfL Rail services were rebranded as the Elizabeth line, with through trains running through central London from November 2022. Heathrow Express services will continue to terminate at London Paddington.

== Company ==
=== Structure ===
Heathrow Connect had a complex operating structure: Heathrow Airport Holdings (formerly BAA) supplied the rolling stock and on-board staff through its Heathrow Express subsidiary, and owned the track from Airport Junction to the terminals. GWR collected the revenue for journeys between Paddington and Hayes & Harlington, while Heathrow Airport Holdings collected the revenue for journeys between Hayes & Harlington and Heathrow.

=== Fares ===
Fares between Paddington and Hayes & Harlington were the same as for GWR services, but the single fare between Hayes and Heathrow was £6.30 as of January 2018. Oyster cards, Travelcards and Freedom Passes were not valid between Hayes & Harlington and Heathrow, but could be used throughout the rest of the route. When the service was first introduced in 2005, the fare for the 3-mile (4.8 km) journey from Hayes to Heathrow was £6, which at £2 per mile made it one of the most expensive train journeys in the world.

The service was designed principally for the use of airport staff and West London residents for travel to Heathrow or Paddington. With a staff ID card, discounted fares were available for the journey between Hayes and Heathrow.

Heathrow Connect was marketed as a cheaper way to reach Paddington from Heathrow and vice versa, with a single fare of £10.30 (less than half the Heathrow Express fare, but almost double the price of a London Underground journey) and a journey time of 25 minutes against the Express time of 15 minutes. Passengers were also permitted to use their Railcards to access discounts. Originally it was not intended to be used as a cheaper (but slower) alternative to the Heathrow Express service from Paddington to Heathrow: every Connect service was overtaken by an Express service en route, and at Paddington trains were originally advertised on departure boards as running to Hayes & Harlington only. Standard-class travel between Heathrow Airport terminals was free, and this included Heathrow Connect services.

The current Elizabeth line service continues the fare structure of Heathrow Connect, being priced approximately halfway between that of the Underground and the Heathrow Express for a typical journey between central London and Heathrow.

== Operations ==
=== Route ===
Heathrow Connect used the relief lines of the Great Western Main Line between Paddington and Airport Junction, replacing some stopping services operated by First Great Western Link. As part of the original Heathrow Express project, these lines were electrified at 25 kV AC overhead as a diversionary route, and featured Automatic Train Protection. An additional flyover bridge was built in 2008 as part of Crossrail works to enable trains to enter or leave the airport spur without crossing any of the Great Western Main Line tracks.

Services initially terminated at Heathrow Central. Following Heathrow Express services being diverted to Terminal 5, from March 2008 Heathrow Connect services were extended to Terminal 4.

The service pattern, as of October 2016, was as follows:

- Monday-Saturday, Heathrow Connect services ran half-hourly between Paddington and Heathrow Central (for terminals 2 & 3), stopping at Ealing Broadway, West Ealing, Hanwell, Southall and Hayes & Harlington. In early mornings and late evenings, some Heathrow Connect services were extended beyond Heathrow Central to either Terminal 4 or Terminal 5.
- On Sundays, all Heathrow Connect services were extended to Terminal 4, but did not call at West Ealing or Hanwell. Service frequency was also reduced from half-hourly to hourly.

=== Rolling stock ===
Heathrow Connect used five-car Class 360/2 electric multiple units. Four were built by Siemens Mobility in Krefeld, Germany for Angel Trains as demonstrator Desiros. One was brought to Northampton Kings Heath Siemens Depot in 2002 before South West Trains' Class 450s were delivered. The others were used at the Wildenrath Test Centre.

All four were purchased by Heathrow Connect and rebuilt before being sent to England. A fifth five-car set was delivered in November 2005, but did not enter service until December 2006. A fifth carriage was added to the original four four-car sets in 2006.

Class	Image	Type	Top speed		Quantity	Number	Carriages	Routes operated	Built
Class	Image	Type	mph	km/h	Quantity	Number	Carriages	Routes operated	Built
360/2 Desiro		EMU	100	161	5	360201–360205	5	London Paddington – Heathrow Terminal 4	2004–2005

== Replacement by TfL Rail ==
TfL Rail Roundel

On 20 May 2018, TfL Rail took over the services operated by Heathrow Connect as a precursor to the full opening of the Elizabeth line, which at that time was expected to take place in December 2018.

Fares on the service were integrated into the TfL fare scheme, and therefore matched the fare scheme of London Underground services, with the exception of a premium for single journeys to and from Heathrow using Pay As You Go (Oyster and contactless). Passengers are able to use Oyster cards, Travelcards and Freedom Passes to travel between Hayes & Harlington and Heathrow.

TfL Rail had originally planned to replace the Class 360 units with Class 345s, but due to delays with the signalling system in the Heathrow Airport tunnels and late delivery of Class 345 units, a contingency plan was implemented. The Class 360s were used between London Paddington and Heathrow, supplemented by two Class 345 trains per hour running between London Paddington and the extended bay platform at Hayes & Harlington, until enough Class 345s were delivered. The Class 360s were fully replaced in September 2020.

For the eventual opening of the core of the Elizabeth line in May 2022, the service was given Elizabeth line branding and train paths were extended via the new tunnels at Paddington through Central London, calling at stations such as Bond Street, Liverpool Street and Canary Wharf to Abbey Wood. The line has fully opened as of November 2022. Eastbound trains from Heathrow will terminate at Shenfield or Abbey Wood.
