= Tyskarna från Lund =

Swedish satirical pop group

- Origin: Sweden
- Years active: 2000s–

Tyskarna från Lund is a Swedish synthpop group, consisting of members from the comedy group Varanteatern. The name translates to The Germans from Lund in English (the Swedish town of Lund is the home of Varanteatern).

Tyskarna från Lund is a satirical group that makes fun of the stereotypical synth music artist and their followers, in particular Kraftwerk. Like the latter group, TFL has a four-person line-up of (fictional) Germans, always dressed in black and with minimal movements on stage.

TFL's lyrics consists of pseudo-German and are more or less Swedish lyrics made to sound German. In 2002, 2006 and 2018, their mock football-themed singles, "Global Fussball OK!", "Global Fussball 06!" and "GLOBAL FUSSBALL XOPOWO" were released around the opening of the World Cup. The 2002 release spent 9 weeks in the Swedish singles charts, peaking at #32.

The act started as a recurring sketch in Varanteaterns shows, most notably in their TV series Varan-TV. The act was popular, and later became a regular group with single and album releases. Varanteatern also started Knut (a parody of the band Kent) and some other bands, but they never became as popular as Tyskarna från Lund.

== Members (pseudonyms) ==
- Lothar Jensen
- Dieter Emung
- Rudi Könnermann
- Heinz Ulrich

== Discography ==
=== Albums ===
- 2003 – Metamorphobia
- 2004 – Die Quelle (German for "The Source" or "The Spring")

=== Singles ===
- 2002 – "Achtung X-mas"
- 2002 – "Global Fussball OK!"
- 2003 – "Metamorphobia" (CD+)
- 2004 – "Kniven, Gaffeln, Skeden" (Swedish for "The Knife, the Fork, the Spoon")
- 2006 – "Global Fussball 06!"
