= Heathrow Terminal 4 railway station =

Railway station serving London Heathrow Airport

Heathrow Terminal 4
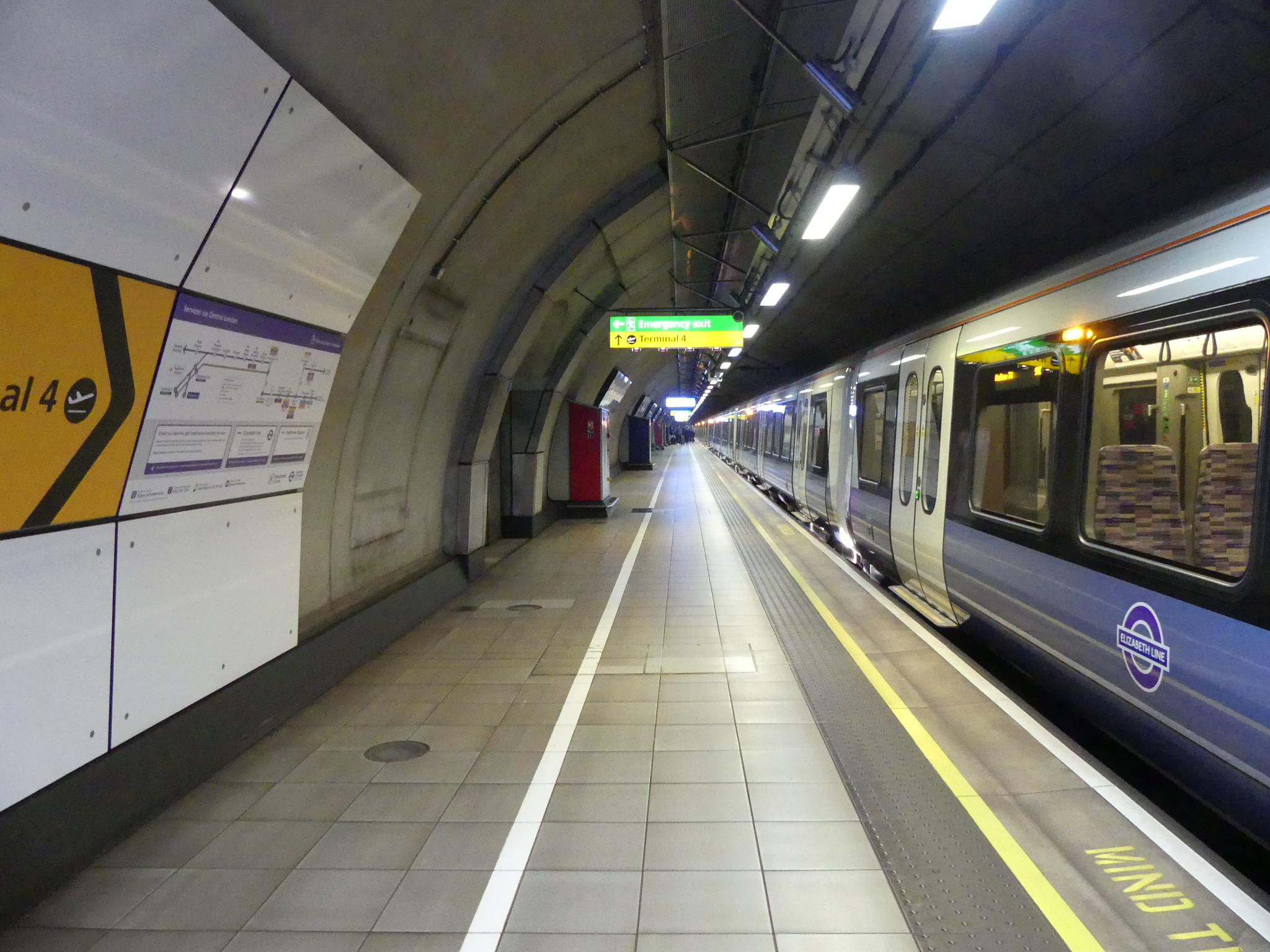
- Heathrow Terminal 4 station platform
- Interactive map of Heathrow Terminal 4

General information
- Location: Heathrow Airport
- Local authority: London Borough of Hillingdon
- Managed by: Heathrow Express
- Owner: Heathrow Airport Holdings
- Station code: HAF
- Number of platforms: 2
- Fare zone: 6

National Rail annual entry and exit
- 2020–21: ▼162
- 2021–22: ▼0
- 2022–23: ▲0.694 million
- 2023–24: ▲1.087 million
- 2024–25: ▲2.058 million

Key dates
- 23 June 1998: Opened
- 9 May 2020: Temporary closure
- 14 June 2022: Reopened

Other information
- External links: Departures; Facilities
- Coordinates: 51.458°N 0.445°W

Heathrow Terminal 4 is a railway station at Heathrow Terminal 4 served by the Elizabeth line. It is in London fare zone 6.

The separate Heathrow Terminal 4 tube station on the Piccadilly line is adjacent to this station. Journeys to and from Heathrow Terminals 2 & 3 railway station and Heathrow Terminal 5 railway station are free of charge and can be used by passengers changing terminals at Heathrow.

== History ==
The station was first suggested in 1978, as part of plans in constructing Terminal 4 and extending the Piccadilly line, by London Transport Executive. Original capital costs of construction were estimated at £20 million.

The station opened on 23 June 1998, together with the Heathrow Express. From 1998 to 2008, the station was the terminus of the Heathrow Express service from London Paddington. All services terminated here after calling at Heathrow Central. In 2005, the Heathrow Connect service was introduced, which provided a slower service to Paddington but calling at local stations along the way, as well as offering cheaper fares. This service also terminated at Terminal 4, together with the Heathrow Express. Upon the opening of the new Heathrow Terminal 5 station in 2008, all Heathrow Express services were re-routed to terminate there, and services to Terminal 4 were replaced with an every 15 minute shuttle service, which ran between Heathrow Central and Terminal 4. Most Heathrow Connect services then terminated at Heathrow Central, although on Sundays, they continued to Terminal 4.

On 20 May 2018, TfL Rail took over the Heathrow Connect service in readiness for becoming part of the Elizabeth line, which at the time was expected to open in December 2018. From May 2018 until 5 November 2022, trains ran half hourly between London Paddington and Heathrow Terminal 4; an additional shuttle runs between Terminal 4 and Heathrow Terminals 2 & 3 railway station to maintain a train service of every 15 minutes between the two stations. On 9 May 2020, Heathrow Terminal 4 station closed temporarily until further notice, due to the closure of the airport's Terminal 4 during the COVID-19 pandemic in London. The station was reopened on 14 June 2022. On 24 May 2022, the Elizabeth line took over operations of services at the station, with through services to Abbey Wood via central London commencing on 6 November 2022.

== Services ==
All services at Heathrow Terminal 4 are operated by the Elizabeth line using Class 345 EMUs.

The typical service is four trains per hour to and from Abbey Wood. A small number of early morning and late evening services run only as far as London Paddington.

| Preceding station | Elizabeth line | Following station |
|---|---|---|
| Terminus | Elizabeth line | Heathrow Terminals 2 & 3 towards Abbey Wood |
