= Farnham Common =

Village in Buckinghamshire, England

Coordinates: 51.555653°N 0.612954°W

- Location within Buckinghamshire
- OS grid reference: SU961850
- Civil parish: Farnham Royal
- Unitary authority: Buckinghamshire
- Ceremonial county: Buckinghamshire
- Region: South East
- Country: England
- Sovereign state: United Kingdom
- Post town: SLOUGH
- Postcode district: SL2
- Dialling code: 01753
- Police: Thames Valley
- Fire: Buckinghamshire
- Ambulance: South Central
- UK Parliament: Beaconsfield

Farnham Common is a village in southern Buckinghamshire, England, 3 miles north of Slough and 3 miles south of Beaconsfield, on the A355 road. It adjoins the ancient woodland Burnham Beeches, has an area of 2.5 miles and a population of around 6,000. It is in the civil parish Farnham Royal.

== History ==
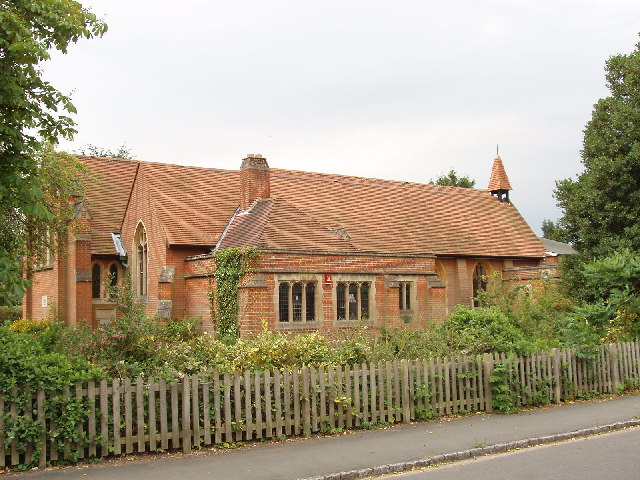
The Church of St John the Evangelist

Farnham Royal was the main village with its church of St Mary's, shops, cottages and village pump situated in the centre junction of the cross roads. Farnham Common was known as 'Up End', being the common land of the parish where the livestock was grazed at certain times of the year. As this common area became more populated it became known as Farnham Common.

Farnham Common is on the border of Burnham Beeches, the well known Beech forest owned by the City of London Corporation, having been given to the people of London as a place in the country for their recreation and pleasure. In the 1920s it was very common for coach loads of Londoners to come down for the day at weekends having tea at the tea rooms and enjoying the donkey rides.

A few of the large old houses still remain such as Yew Place, Farnham Park House and the home of Caldicott. Yew Place was formerly known as The Rectory, part of which dates back to the time of King John. The original farmhouse was given to a coachman in the service of the Earl of Warwick. The Chase, now known as Farnham Park House, was owned by Mr Carr Gomme, a very influential member of the community, being one of the main organisers of fund-raisers for the building of St John's Church. The house passed into the hands of Sir Gomer Berry, later Lord Kemsley, who had the organ dismantled from Farnham Park House and gave it to St John's Church. In 1948 Farnham Park house became the Farnham Park Rehabilitation Centre, a renowned sports injury hospital owned by the East Berkshire Health Authority until its closure in 1988. In 1996 Farnham Park House was re-established as a private residence.

Caldicott is a large house situated on the edge of Burnham Beeches and was once owned by Mrs Harvey who gave money for the extension of Farnham Common Village Hall. Caldicott is now a boys' preparatory school.

A few names of note who have been associated with Farnham Common have been the artist Rex Whistler's mother, who lived in The Small House in Burnham Beeches; J. M. Barrie, the author of Peter Pan and Enid Blyton, the children's author. In Burnham Beeches there is a large beech tree under which Felix Mendelssohn used to sit and compose some of his works in 'peaceful splendour'. Joan Hammond, the opera singer, lived in the part of the village known as Egypt. The Moore family live in the village and hold the record of three generations of one family representing Great Britain in the Olympic Games, Major George Moore having competed in 1948, Lieut. Col. John Moore, his son, in 1956, 1960 and 1964 and Lieut. Mark Moore, his grandson, in 1984. Lieut. Col. John Moore was appointed OBE for his services to skiing. Lois Allan invented Fuzzy Felt in her cottage in the village during World War II.

More recently, Burnham Beeches has been used as a film set for some of the Harry Potter films, including the Order of the Phoenix and the Deathly Hallows Part 2.

== Facilities ==
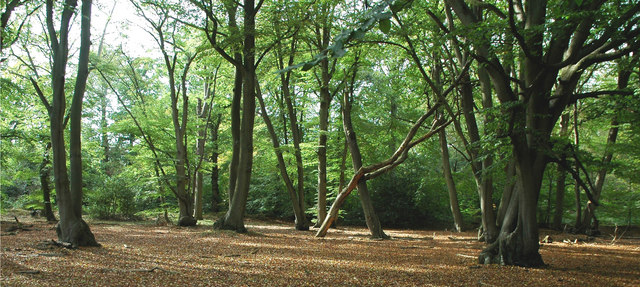
Burnham Beeches

A small high street includes numerous businesses, stores, eateries and shops.

The National Baseball & Softball Complex at Farnham Park is located just south of the village, between Farnham Royal and Slough. It is the home of the Great Britain Baseball and Great Britain Softball Olympic National Teams, and is the largest complex of its kind in the United Kingdom.

== Transport ==
=== Road ===
- 3 miles from M40 motorway Junction 2
- 4 miles from M4 motorway Junction 6
- 8 miles from M25 motorway Junction 16

=== Train ===
- 4 miles from Gerrards Cross railway station (18 mins to Marylebone station)
- 3.5 miles from Burnham railway station (Elizabeth line 39 mins to Bond Street)
- 4 miles from Slough railway station (Elizabeth Line 34 mins to Bond Street)

=== Bus ===
- No.X74 connecting High Wycombe, Farnham Common and Slough

=== Air ===
- 20 min drive to Heathrow Airport
- 35 min drive to Luton Airport
- 50 min drive to Gatwick Airport
- 1 hour drive to Stansted Airport

== Schools ==
=== Preparatory schools ===
- Caldicott School - Boys 7-13
- Dair House - Mixed 3-11

=== Grammar school catchment ===
- Girls Grammar catchment map
- Boys Grammar catchment map
- Beaconsfield High School - Ofsted rated Outstanding
- John Hampden Grammar School - Ofsted rated Outstanding
- Burnham Grammar School - Ofsted rated Good

=== State schools ===
- Farnham Common Infant School
- Farnham Common Junior School (for 2015 - 97% of pupils achieved level 4 or above in reading, writing and maths. Ranked #8 in Buckinghamshire in KS2 results)

== Notable inhabitants ==
- Johnny Ball - former children's television presenter
- Bret Freeman - (Bret Hollywood) Professional Ring Announcer
- Martin O'Neill – football manager
- Dennis Waterman – actor
- Paula Hamilton - former supermodel
- Peter Lamont - Art Director
- Alan Carr - comedian

== Notable former inhabitants ==
- Zoë Ball – radio DJ
- Jimmy Carr – comedian
- Sir Peter Grain, former Chief Judge of the British Supreme Court for China
- Ulrika Jonsson – television presenter
- Roger Moore - actor
- Phil Vickery – celebrity chef
- Rick Wakeman – musician
