= Lambourne Golf Club =

Golf club in Buckinghamshire, England

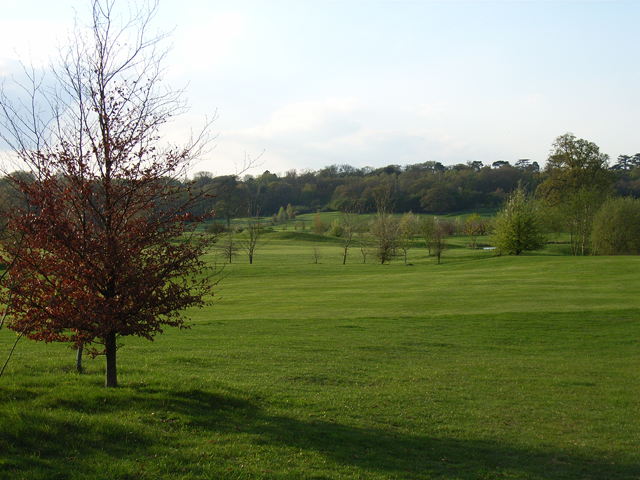

- Location within Buckinghamshire
- 51°33′26″N 0°39′41″W

Club information
- Location: Dropmore, Buckinghamshire, England
- Established: 1992
- Type: Parkland
- Total holes: 18

Lambourne Golf Club is a golf club in Dropmore, Buckinghamshire, England. It is located about a mile north of Burnham and about 3 miles (5 km) northwest of Slough, not far from the Burnham Beeches Golf Club. It was established in 1992 and the course was designed by Donald Steel.
