= Burnham, Buckinghamshire =

Village in Buckinghamshire, England

Coordinates: 51.54°N 0.66°W

Burnham
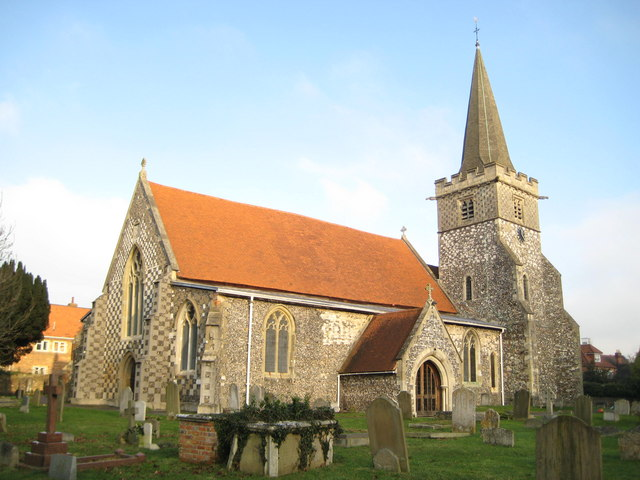
- St Peter's parish church

- Location within Buckinghamshire
- Area: 19.84 km^{2} (7.66 sq mi)
- Population: 11,630 (2011 census)
  - Density: 586/km^{2} (1,520/sq mi)
- OS grid reference: SU9282
- Civil parish: Burnham
- Unitary authority: Buckinghamshire
- Ceremonial county: Buckinghamshire
- Region: South East
- Country: England
- Sovereign state: United Kingdom
- Post town: SLOUGH
- Postcode district: SL1, SL2
- Dialling code: 01628
- Police: Thames Valley
- Fire: Buckinghamshire
- Ambulance: South Central
- UK Parliament: Beaconsfield

Burnham is a large village and civil parish that lies north of the River Thames in southern Buckinghamshire, between the towns of Maidenhead and Slough, about 24 miles west of Charing Cross, London. It is probably best known for the nearby Burnham Beeches woodland.

The village is served by Burnham railway station on the main line between London Paddington and Reading. The M4 motorway passes through the south of the parish.

== History ==
The toponym is derived from the Old English for "homestead on a stream". It was first recorded in the Domesday Book of 1086 as Burneham, when the manor was held by Walter FitzOther.

Burnham was once a very important village. The Great West Road from London to Bath passed through the extensive parish of Burnham and as a result, in 1271, a Royal charter was granted to hold a market and an annual fair. However, when the first Maidenhead Bridge crossing the Thames opened c.1280, the road was diverted to the south of Burnham (the route of the modern A4), and Burnham fell into relative decline. The market was then transferred to Maidenhead.

Today the village is nearly contiguous with west Slough, though green-buffered by parkland. At the 2011 census the civil parish had a population of 11,630 and Burnham is the traditional village nucleus.

=== Parish Church ===
The Church of England parish church of Saint Peter dates in part from the 12th century but has been substantially expanded, refurbished and altered, with major restorations in 1863–64 and 1891 and the construction of the Cornerstone Centre in 1986.

=== Burnham Abbey ===
In 1266 a Benedictine women's abbey was founded near the village by Richard, Earl of Cornwall. The community was dispersed under King Henry VIII in the dissolution of the monasteries. Since 1916, a contemplative order of Church of England Augustinian nuns, the Society of the Precious Blood, has been based in the restored remains of the original abbey. The abbey was put up for sale in 2024.

=== Hamlets ===
The parish of Burnham included a number of communities: in the 18th century the liberties assessed for the poor rate were Burnham Town, East Burnham, Boveney, Britwell, Cippenham and Wood. Boveney became a separate civil parish in 1866 Cippenham was transferred to Slough in 1930, and therefore became part of Berkshire in 1974. Britwell was transferred to the borough of Slough and to Berkshire in 1974.

The current civil parish now includes Lent Rise, Rose Hill, East Burnham, Hitcham, Littleworth and Littleworth Common.

== Schools ==
The selective Burnham Grammar School provides secondary education.

== Amenities ==
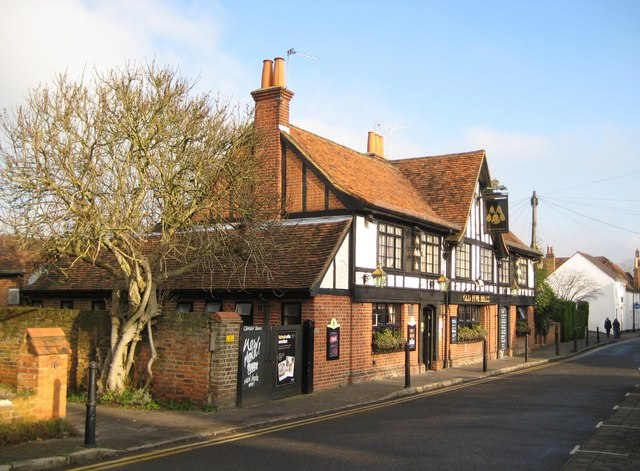
The Old Five Bells

The village has a traditional High Street, with many buildings dating from the 18th and 19th century. There are two small supermarkets and five pubs on or near the High Street, and many small independent cafes and shops. At the south end of the High Street is a large park, which contains the community centre of Burnham Park Hall and a small public library.

Burnham Football Club is a non-League football team that plays at the 1878 Stadium.

Burnham has a Local nature reserve on the eastern border of the village called Haymill Valley.

Burnham Beeches National Nature Reserve, an area of 540 acres (220 ha) of protected ancient woodland, lies just north of the village. Owing to its proximity to Pinewood Film & TV Studios, Burnham and its surrounding areas (in particular Burnham Beeches) feature in films, notably main scenes in Carry On films and for the 1991 film Robin Hood: Prince of Thieves.

The major National Trust estate of Cliveden is about three miles northwest, in the neighbouring parish of Taplow. Dorneywood, currently the country home of the UK Chancellor of the Exchequer, is in Burnham parish.

The River Thames is about two miles south and west of the village centre. The major rowing venue of Dorney Lake is nearby. There are three golf courses (Huntswood, Lambourne, Burnham Beeches) to the north and west of the village.

== Transport links ==
In addition to Burnham railway station (Elizabeth line) and the nearby M4, the Chiltern Main Line and the M40 are accessible about 5 miles north at Beaconsfield while Heathrow Airport is about 12 miles east.

== Demography ==
2011 Published Statistics: Population, home ownership and extracts from Physical Environment, surveyed in 2005
Output area	Homes owned outright	Owned with a loan	Socially rented	Privately rented	Other	km^{2} roads	km^{2} water	km^{2} domestic gardens	km^{2} domestic buildings	km^{2} non-domestic buildings	Usual residents	km^{2}
Civil parish	1632	1748	780	472	60	0.716	0.057	1.907	0.355	0.122	11630	19.84

== Notable people ==
- Richard Davies vicar 1550–54 and 1559–61, Bishop of St Asaph 1560–61 then Bishop of St Davids 1561–81
- Lord Grenville (Prime Minister 1806–07) built Dropmore House to the north of the village.
- Charles William Sharpe – engraver
- Mike Ashley – billionaire businessman
- Jimmy Carr – comedian attended Burnham Grammar School
- Susan Cooper – author
- Armando Iannucci – writer
- Ulrika Jonsson – TV presenter
- Will Mellor – Actor
- Anton Du Beke - professional dancer & TV presenter
- Paul Shaw – footballer
- Tracey Ullman – comedian
- Arthur Wontner – actor

== Freedom of the Parish ==
Freedom of the Parish of Burnham was inaugurated as the village's highest honour in 2023. Since then, it has been conferred on only two people.

=== Individuals ===
- Councillor David Pepler: 9 November 2024.
- Mrs. Muriel Pepler: 9 November 2024.
