= Alfred de Breanski Jr. =

British landscapist and floral painter (1877–1957)

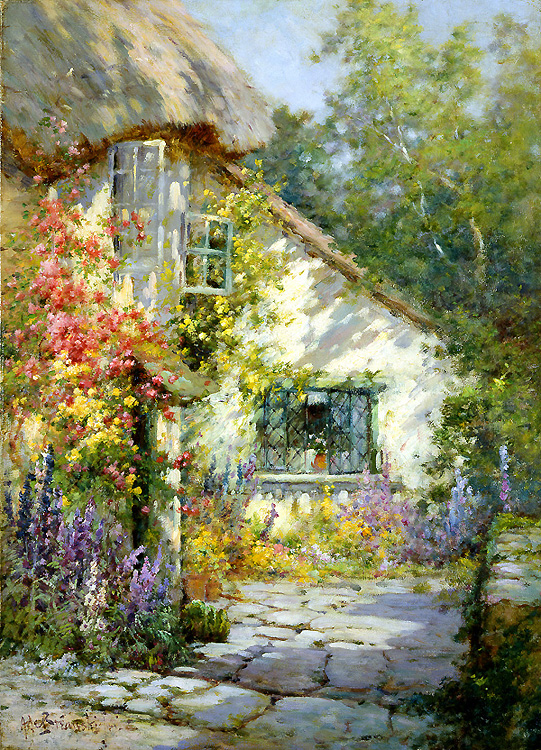
"A Home in Devon"

Alfred Fontville de Breanski Jr. (28 August 1877 – 17 April 1957) was a British painter.

== Biography ==
Born in London, he was the son of the highly regarded Victorian painter Alfred de Breanski. His mother was the Welsh painter Annie Roberts, his uncle Gustave de Breanski was a noted seascape painter, and his younger brother Arthur also achieved success as a painter. He studied at St. Martins School of Art. In the 1890s, de Breanski ventured to France to “finish” his artistic education where he met the elderly James McNeil Whistler and explored the arts community of belle époque Paris. The influence of this sojourn is evident in his increasingly Symbolist treatment of his characteristic landscapes. Simultaneously, he absorbed the Impressionist's emphasis on unadulterated color and stenographic brushwork. On his return to London, de Breanski began to display his paintings at the annual metropolitan exhibitions, both at the Royal Academy and at the Royal Society of British Artists. He generally painted natural landscape and rustic scenes, showing the influence of Impressionism in his later life.

In 1915 he produced multiple posters for the Underground Electric Railways Company showing Twickenham by Tram and Kew Gardens by Tram

He died in Tonbridge, Kent, in 1957.

== Representative Works ==
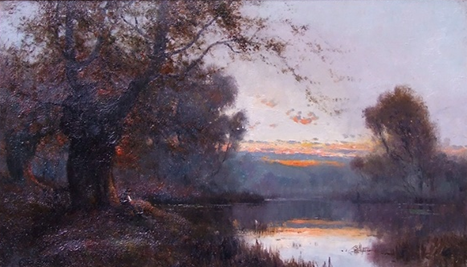
Autumn Evening, Burnham Beeches (Figure 1)

Figure 1. “Autumn Evening” is set at Burnham Beeches, known for its ancient trees, particularly during autumn. The artist uses a balanced composition, with the trees framing the water and the sunset in the center. The use of light and shadow creates depth and draws the viewer's eye to the focal point. The painting employs a muted palette with warm tones of orange and yellow contrasting with the cooler blues and grays of the evening sky and water. This palette is characteristic of the tonalist style, which emphasizes atmosphere and mood. A figure can be seen sitting near the water, adding a human element to the scene.

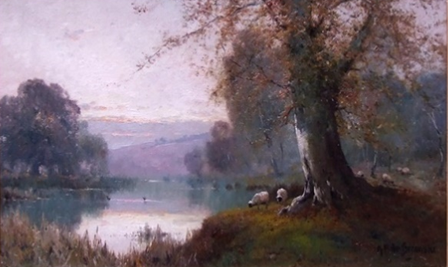
Early Morning, Burnham Beeches (Figure 3)

Figure 2. “Early Morning” also set at Burnham Beeches depicts a serene, landscape at dawn, illuminated by the soft glow of the early morning light. Several sheep are grazing near the water's edge, adding a pastoral element to the scene. Trees line the riverbank, their foliage rendered with visible brushstrokes, suggesting an impressionistic influence. The play of light and shadow on the trees and water creates depth and atmosphere. In the background we see rolling hills and a soft, pale sky with hints of pink and orange from the sunset. This warm color palette contrasts with the cooler tones of the water and trees, enhancing the overall composition.

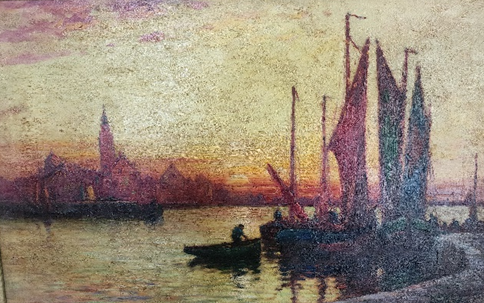
Sunset at Deventer (Figure 3)

Figures 3 and 4. In these evocative maritime compositions, Alfred de Breanski Jr. departs from his characteristic Highland landscapes to explore the quiet grandeur of two Dutch harbors at dusk, Deventer and Veere. The paintings capture the fleeting moment when the sun dips below the horizon, casting a warm, amber glow across the still waters. Tall-masted vessels, their rigging silhouetted against the fading light, rest motionless in the harbors. Both canvases are notable for the church towers featured in each skyline: the Lebuïnuskerk in Deventer and Onze Lieve Vrouwekerk in Veere. It is clear by this time in his career that Breanski Jr. had adapted Impressionistic techniques.

== Selected Museums ==
Government Art Collection, Department for Culture, Media and Sport, London

London Transport Museum

Watford Museum, Watford, UK

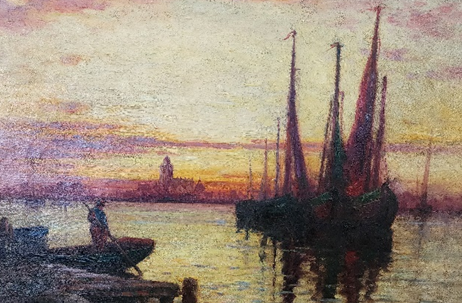
Evening at Veere (Figure 4)
