= Littleworth, South Bucks =

Hamlet in Buckinghamshire, England

Coordinates: 51.5669°N 0.6530°W

Littleworth
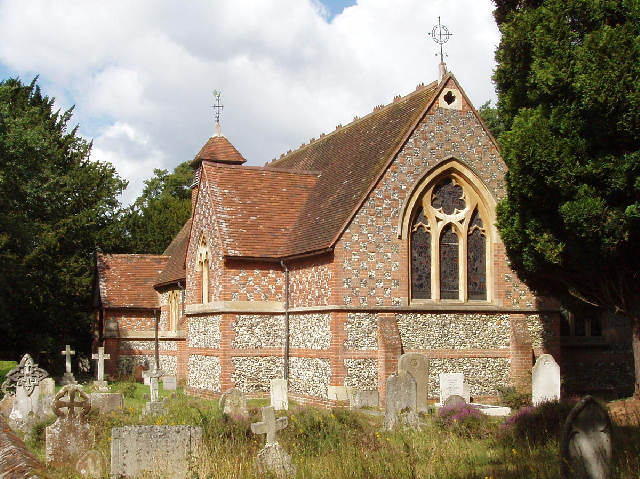
- St Anne's parish church, Dropmore

- Location within Buckinghamshire
- OS grid reference: SU933862
- Civil parish: Burnham
- Unitary authority: Buckinghamshire
- Ceremonial county: Buckinghamshire
- Region: South East
- Country: England
- Sovereign state: United Kingdom
- Post town: Slough
- Postcode district: SL1
- Dialling code: 01753
- Police: Thames Valley
- Fire: Buckinghamshire
- Ambulance: South Central
- UK Parliament: Beaconsfield
- Website: Burnham Parish Council

Littleworth is a hamlet in Burnham civil parish, in the South Bucks district of Buckinghamshire, England.

There are some cottages and houses around Littleworth Common, a Site of Special Scientific Interest that covers 200 acres (81 ha). There are two pubs (The Blackwood Arms and the Jolly Woodman) and Dropmore Infant School. To the west are the fenced off grounds of Dropmore House which was built in about 1792 for William Wyndham and a gatehouse to it called Oak Lodge.

== Parish church ==
The Church of England parish church of Saint Anne, Dropmore is a brick and flint Gothic Revival building designed by William Butterfield and built in 1866. The south aisle was added in 1877, probably also designed by Butterfield. The building is Grade II* listed.
