= GTS Rail Operations =

British train operating company

GTS Rail Operations Limited

Overview
- Concession: Elizabeth line
- Main region: London
- Other regions: Berkshire; Buckinghamshire; Essex
- Fleet: 70
- Stations operated: 41
- Parent company: Go-Ahead Group (65%); Tokyo Metro (17.5%); Sumitomo Corporation (17.5%)
- Headquarters: Chancery Station House, High Holborn, London
- Reporting mark: XR

Other
- Website: gtsr.co.uk

GTS Rail Operations Limited is a British train operating company owned by Go-Ahead Group, Tokyo Metro and Sumitomo Corporation that commenced operating the Elizabeth line concession on 25 May 2025.

== History ==
In February 2024, Transport for London shortlisted four bidders for the next Elizabeth line concession:

- Arriva UK Trains
- FirstGroup / Keolis joint venture
- Go-Ahead Group / Tokyo Metro / Sumitomo Corporation joint venture
- MTR Corporation

In November 2024, the Go-Ahead Group / Tokyo Metro / Sumitomo Corporation joint venture was awarded the contract with GTS Rail Operations to take over from MTR Elizabeth line on 25 May 2025. The contract will run for seven years with an optional two-year extension.

== Fleet ==
GTS Rail Operations inherited 70 Class 345 units from MTR Elizabeth line: a further ten trains will be introduced in 2026.

Preceded by MTR Elizabeth line	Operator of Elizabeth line concession 2025–present	Incumbent
