= Burnham Beeches =

Nature reserve in Buckinghamshire, England

Coordinates: 51.562629°N 0.63018°W

- Site of Special Scientific Interest
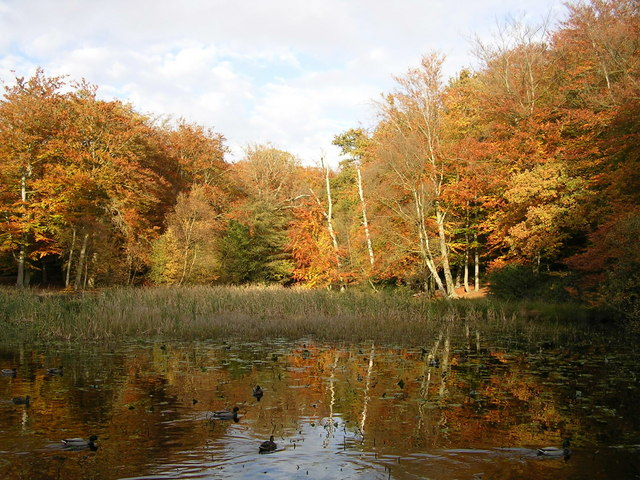
- Middle Pond
- Location of Burnham Beeches.
- Area of search: Buckinghamshire
- Grid reference: SU950857
- Interest: Biological
- Area: 374.6 ha (926 acres)
- Notification date: 1985
- Location map: Magic Map

Burnham Beeches is a 374.6-hectare (926-acre) biological Site of Special Scientific Interest situated west of Farnham Common in the village of Burnham, Buckinghamshire. The southern half is owned by the Corporation of London and is open to the public. It is also a National Nature Reserve and a Special Area of Conservation.

Burnham Beeches came into ownership of the City of London Corporation after the land came up for auction in 1879. The auction followed the death of the land owner who had permitted public access. Its special status was recognised and discussed in the House of Commons. The land failed to sell at the auction. Subsequently Sir Henry Peek purchased the land at the reserve price £12,000. Sir Henry Peek sold 374 acres (151 hectares) to the City of London Corporation (£6,000), retaining the "enclosed" portion of the land of 175 acres (71 hectares). Purchase was funded from duties levied on grain landed at the Port of London. Money was also spent on roads to improve access (estimated cost £500), one of these is named after Sir Henry. At this time local authorities were encouraged to provide open spaces with public access to provide some relief from polluted towns and cities. (Summarised from Hansard and various contemporary newspaper reports.)

== Preservation ==
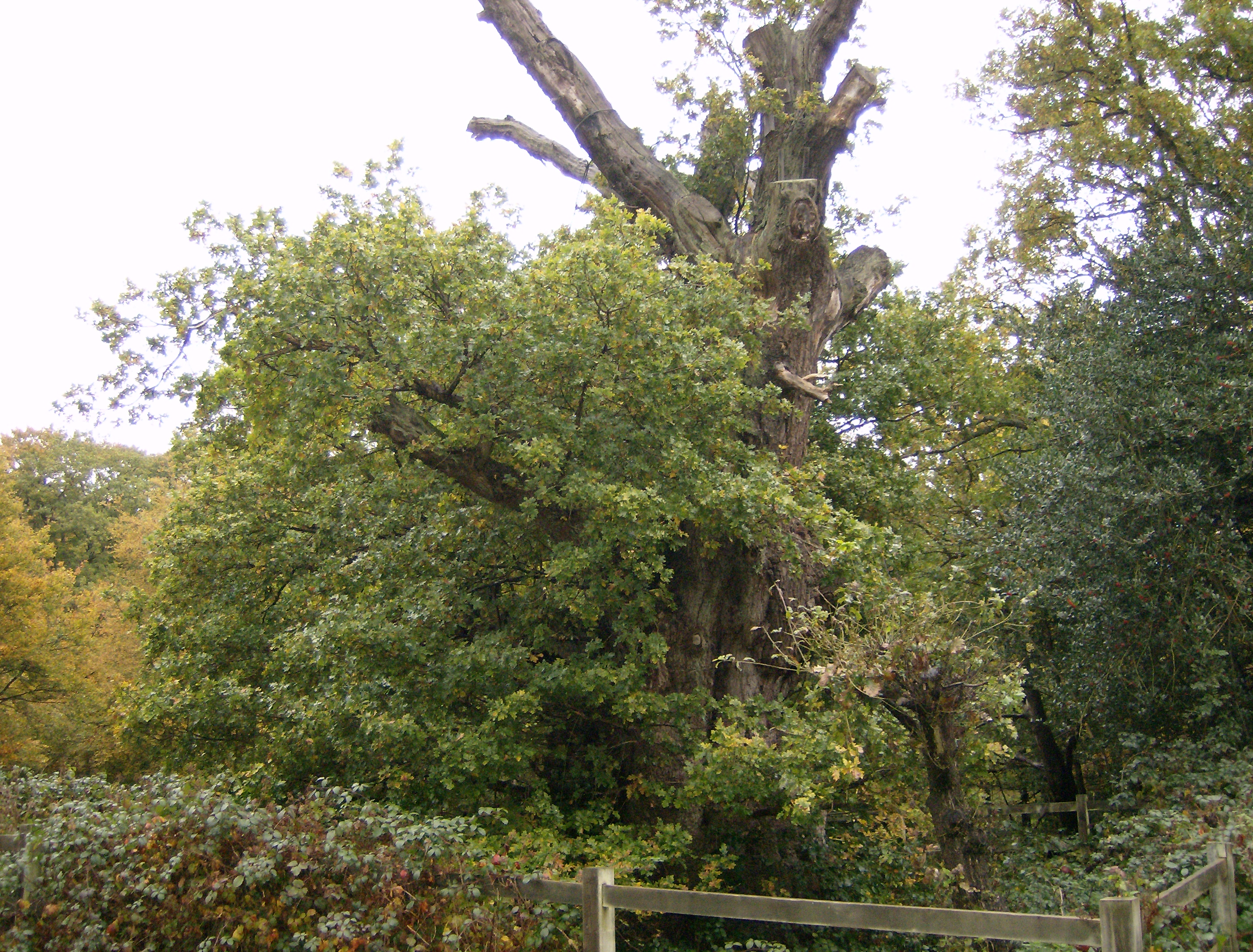
Druids Oak, the oldest tree in Burnham Beeches

The largely beech woodland has been regularly pollarded, with many trees now several hundred years old. Their age, and the amount of deadwood in and around them, means that the woodland is rich in wildlife. More than sixty of the species of plants and animals here are either rare or under threat nationally. The area is protected as a National Nature Reserve, Site of Special Scientific Interest and a candidate Special Area of Conservation.

== Archaeology ==
Seven Ways Plain hill fort is located in the south west part of Burnham Beeches. It is a rare example of a single rampart earthwork used either as a stock enclosures or possibly places of refuge. It comprises a range of earthworks which have been dated to the Late Bronze Age and Early Iron Age. It is a Scheduled Monument.

== Filming ==
The close proximity of Pinewood, Shepperton and Bray Studios and the outstanding natural beauty of the Beeches have made it a desirable filming location. Robin Hood Prince of Thieves, The Crying Game, First Knight, Goldfinger, The Princess Bride, the 1952 Disney film The Story of Robin Hood and His Merrie Men, Harry Potter and the Order of the Phoenix and Harry Potter and the Deathly Hallows – Part 1, Maleficent: Mistress of Evil, Deadpool & Wolverine, Horrible Histories: The Movie, and the Doctor Who story State of Decay are some of the films and TV productions that have been shot at Burnham Beeches.

Filming is tightly controlled in recognition of the Beeches' international importance for wildlife. Filming is restricted to no more than twenty days per year and to certain times of year. Filming in environmentally sensitive areas has also been banned. Revenue from filming goes directly to fund the upkeep and management of the Beeches.

== Affiliates ==
Burnham, New Zealand, was named after the village of Burnham.

Burnham Beeches F.C. are an amateur football team who currently compete in the East Berkshire Football League.

== See also ==
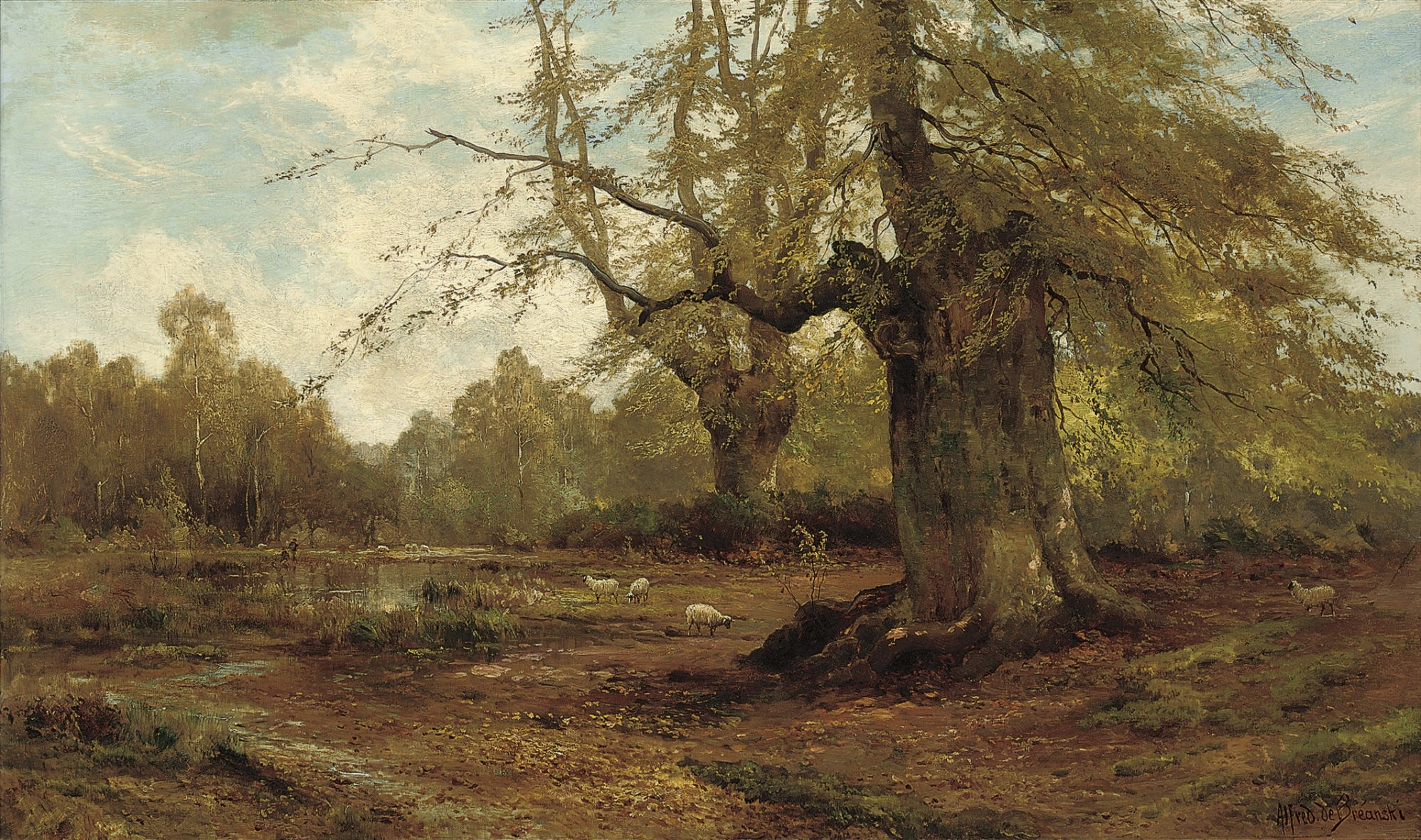
Alfred de Bréanski Burnham Beeches

- Burnham railway station (formerly Burnham Beeches railway station)
- Dropmore Park
- English Lowlands beech forests
