= Taplow railway station =

Railway station in Buckinghamshire, England

Taplow
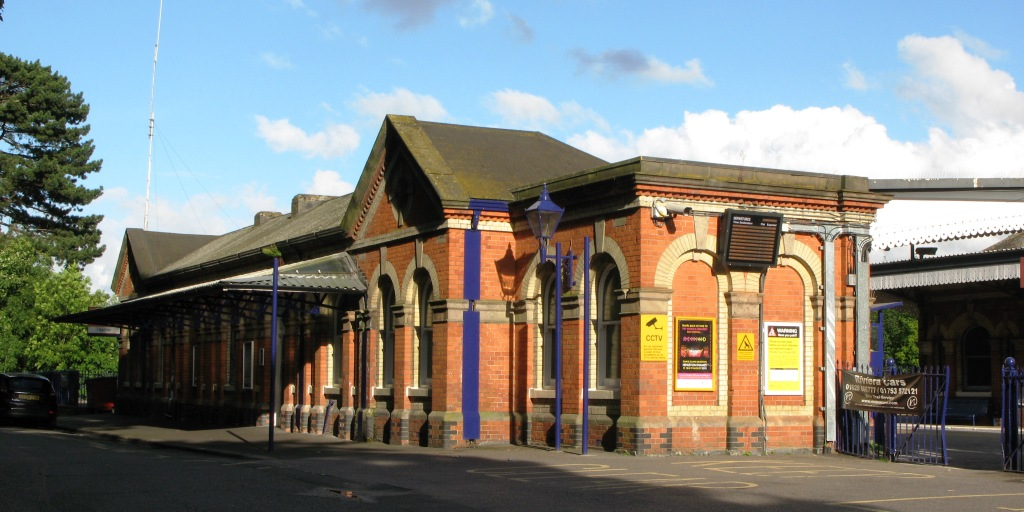
- Station exterior in 2012
- Interactive map of Taplow

General information
- Location: Taplow
- Local authority: Buckinghamshire
- Grid reference: SU915813
- Managed by: Elizabeth line
- Owner: Network Rail
- Station code: TAP
- DfT category: E
- Number of platforms: 4
- Accessible: Yes

National Rail annual entry and exit
- 2020–21: ▼94,914
- 2021–22: ▲0.277 million
- 2022–23: ▲0.300 million
- 2023–24: ▲0.460 million
- 2024–25: ▲0.529 million

Railway companies
- Original company: Great Western Railway
- Pre-grouping: GWR
- Post-grouping: GWR

Key dates
- 1 September 1872: New location opened

Other information
- External links: Departures; Facilities
- Coordinates: 51.524°N 0.681°W

Taplow railway station serves the village of Taplow in Buckinghamshire, England. It is 22 miles 39 chains (36.2 km) down the line from London Paddington; it is situated between Burnham to the east and Maidenhead to the west.

The station has been served by local services operated by the Elizabeth line since December 2019. Currently, all eastbound trains terminate at Abbey Wood; most westbound services terminate at Reading, with a few peak-time services terminating at Maidenhead.

== History ==
=== Original station ===
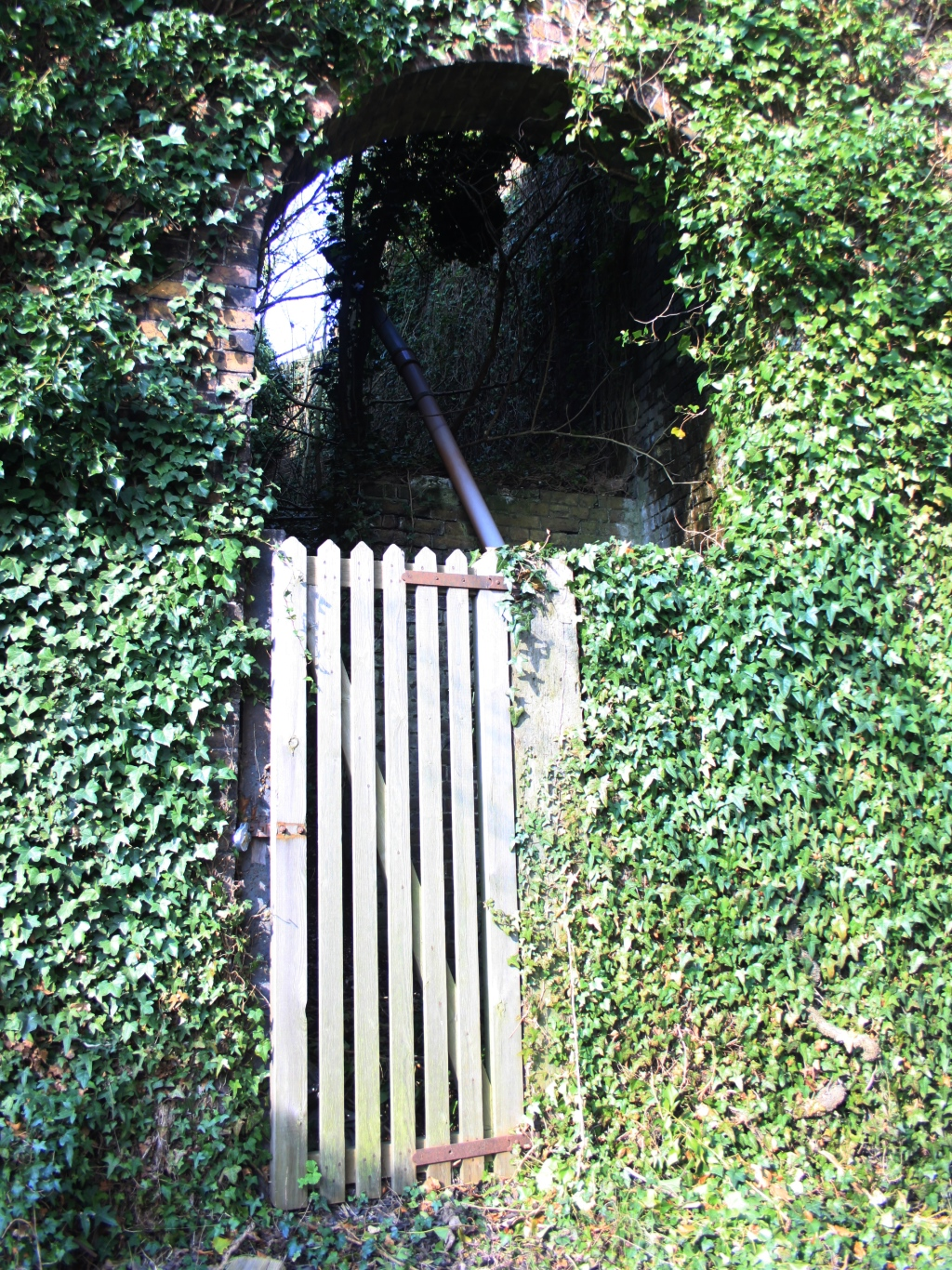
The entrance to the original station (in 2016)

The first station was opened on 4 June 1838 as Maidenhead (referred to as Maidenhead Riverside in some publications). The station was the terminus of the Great Western Railway for just over a year until the opening of Maidenhead Railway Bridge and the line to Twyford on 1 July 1839. The station was renamed Maidenhead and Taplow in August 1854. It was constructed of wood, and situated west of the skew bridge that carries the railway over the Bath Road (the modern A4), near grid reference SU909812.

With the opening of the present Maidenhead station 1 1/2 miles (2.4 km) to the west on 1 November 1871, Maidenhead and Taplow station was renamed Taplow; it was closed less than a year later on 1 September 1872, when a new Taplow station was opened at its current location 1/4 mile (0.40 km) to the east. As with Burnham station to the east, the station is located to the south of the village centre.

=== Current station ===
The current station was opened on 1 September 1872. It was probably designed by GWR architect J. E. Danks, and largely dates from the quadrupling of the line, with dual gauge main-line tracks. It is unusually large and grand in appearance, despite the fact it only serves a relatively small number of passengers during the day. The first reason for this was because several major GWR shareholders lived nearby and therefore used the station in Victorian times. The second was that it was always intended to be part of a high-quality network of stations for commuters using the GWR.

During World War II Taplow station played an important part in transporting tanks stored at "the dump" which is now at the site of Slough Trading Estate. The concrete and steel-reinforced road that was laid to take the weight of the tanks remains intact, and forms part of the access road to the station's southern car park. Just to the north of the station on a rail siding was a large barbed wire dump. The siding has long since been removed, the remaining noticeable incline being partially occupied by the nearby SGT car dealership buildings.

The remaining buildings of the station are outwardly little changed since their original construction.

=== 2006 refurbishment ===
In 2006, the 1884-built station footbridge underwent a major refurbishment costing £250,000. The footbridge was in a very poor state of repair before the work began. This project also included a repainting of the station buildings, partial resurfacing of the island platforms, and renewal of the flower beds. The refurbishment was completed in time for the 2006 World Rowing Championships at Dorney Lake, which used a shuttle bus service to transport spectators to and from the event. For the duration of the event, the station briefly had a Sunday service. The station was heavily used during the London 2012 Olympics, because of the rowing and canoeing events at Dorney Lake.

=== Crossrail and GWML Modernisation ===
Various improvement works have been made at the station, with the modernisation of many station facilities, heated waiting rooms, and a new footbridge with lifts for step-free access. This is in addition to the work carried out as part of the modernisation of the Great Western main line, which included the modernisation of signalling systems and electrification of the line between London Paddington and Cardiff Central.

In December 2017, Taplow became the westernmost railway station to be managed by Transport for London, with management of the station handed over from Great Western Railway ahead of commencement of Elizabeth line services through the station.

== Facilities ==
Taplow retains the Victorian era ticket office, with a footbridge linking the platforms. There are four platforms, though platforms 1 and 2 (on the express lines) are gated off and only used in exceptional circumstances. The station is equipped with a ticket vending machine (TVM) and modern customer information screens and has a CCTV monitored car park. Contactless payment pads were added, and a new footbridge with three lifts were installed to provide step-free access to all platforms. The station previously had a bike shelter installed and toilets refurbished by First Great Western. Taplow received 'Secure Station' accreditation from the British Transport Police.

The original footbridge dating from 1884 was removed entirely in mid-2018, and replaced by a second temporary structure. The refurbishment of the lattice footbridge (damaged by railway contractors) appears to have been cancelled; a new modern footbridge with lifts at the London end of the station opened in late 2019.

== Services ==
Off-peak, all services at Taplow are operated by the Elizabeth line using Class 345 EMUs.

The typical off-peak service in trains per hour (tph) is:

- 2 tph to Abbey Wood
- 2 tph to Reading

Additional services call at the station during the peak hours, increasing the service to up to 4 tph in each direction.

The station is also served by a small number of early morning and late evening Great Western Railway services between London Paddington and Reading.

Preceding station	Elizabeth line	Following station
Maidenhead towards Reading	Elizabeth line	Burnham towards Abbey Wood
National Rail
Maidenhead	Great Western Railway Great Western Main Line Limited Service	Burnham

== In fiction ==
In Thomas & Friends the Main Line station Kellsthorpe Road is based on this station.

== Bibliography ==
- Butt, R.V.J. (1995). The Directory of Railway Stations. Yeovil: Patrick Stephens Ltd. ISBN 1-85260-508-1. R508.
- MacDermot, E.T. (1927). History of the Great Western Railway, vol. I: 1833-1863. Paddington: Great Western Railway.
- Over, Luke (September 2001). Delaney, Peter (ed.). "The Railway Comes to Maidenhead". Wargrave Local History Society. Archived from the original on 25 March 2005.
