= Gustave de Breanski =

- Born: 1856; London, England
- Died: 1898 (aged 41–42)

Gustave de Breanski (1856–1898) was a British painter known for his romantic and atmospheric landscape paintings.

== Life and career ==
Born in London to a family with artistic roots (his brother was the noted Victorian landscape artist Alfred de Breanski; his nephew was Alfred Fontville de Breanski Jr.), he attended the Royal Academy Schools in London and became one of the leading landscape painters of the late 19th century. His work primarily focused on seascapes, often painted with an emphasis on the effects of light and weather. His artistic training helped him develop a distinctive style characterized by his meticulous attention to detail and his skillful use of light and color.

De Breanski's work gained wide recognition, and he exhibited frequently at the Royal Academy and other prestigious venues. His paintings were highly regarded during his lifetime, and he enjoyed a successful career. He was a member of the Royal Society of British Artists and had a significant influence on landscape painters of his time.

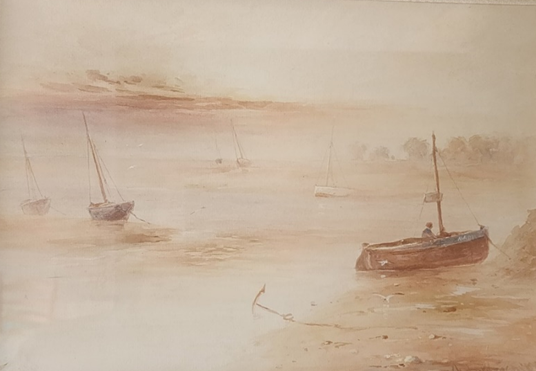
Harbor at Dawn

In his luminous coastal watercolor entitled "Harbor at Dawn", Gustave de Breanski captures the hushed stillness of a harbor at daybreak. A cluster of sailboats rests in calm, reflective waters, their masts rising like delicate etchings against a sky tinged with soft hues of rose, peach, and lavender. A lone figure tends to a boat near the shore, grounding the composition in quiet human presence. The distant tree line and gentle ripples on the water's surface evoke a sense of depth and atmosphere, hallmarks of Breanski's mature style. This current composition is balanced, with boats positioned across the scene and the horizon line placed in the upper third of the painting. This arrangement creates a sense of depth and perspective.
