= Burnham Grammar School =

Location
- Hogfair Lane; Burnham, Buckinghamshire, SL1 7HG; England; 51.5323°N 0.6522°W

Information
- Type: Academy Grammar School
- Motto: Embracing Challenge
- Established: 1960
- Local authority: Academy
- Specialist: Science, maths and languages
- Department for Education URN: 137564 Tables
- Ofsted: Reports
- Headteacher: Andrew J Gillespie
- Gender: Mixed
- Age: 11 to 18
- Enrolment: 1247
- Houses: Winton; Roosevelt; King; Ali
- Colours: Mustard, Crimson, Navy, and Mint (respectively)
- Website: www.burnhamgrammar.org.uk

Burnham Grammar School (BGS) is a co-educational grammar school in Burnham, Buckinghamshire. In October 2011 the school became an academy. It takes students aged 11–18, with approximately 1250 on roll (as of 2021/2022).

In September 2004 the Department for Education and Skills (DfES) awarded the school specialist school status as a science college.

In May 2011 the school applied for academy status in order to be released from local education authority (LEA) control.

The current headteacher is Andrew Gillespie, who took over from Catherine Long in January 2008.

== Notable alumni ==
- Mike Ashley, an entrepreneur
- Jimmy Carr, a comedian
- Ulrika Jonsson, a television presenter and model
