= Alfred de Breanski =

British landscapist (1852–1928)

Alfred de Breanski (1852–1928) was a British painter. His "Constablesque" landscapes of England, Scotland and Wales are particularly noted. Some of his works were exhibited at the Royal Academy. As of 2026, there are 46 paintings by him in British public collections, including the Southampton City Art Gallery, The Royal Agricultural University Collection, Brighton and Hove, Bromley, Middlesbrough, Glasgow, Sheffield and Bournemouth. He had a brother, Gustave de Breanski, and a son Alfred de Breanski Jr., who were also painters.

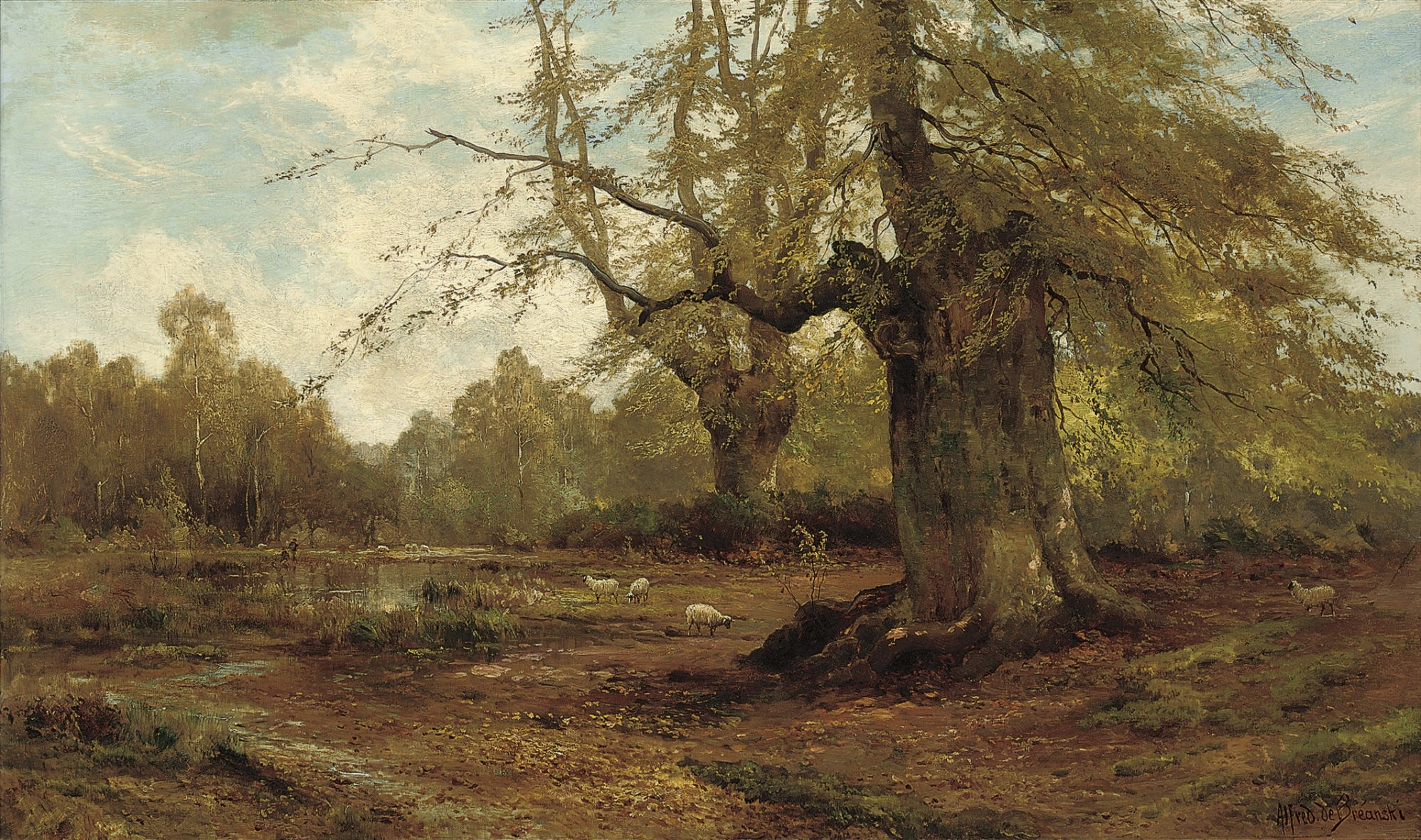
Burnham Beeches
