= Burnham Beeches Golf Club =

Golf club in Buckinghamshire, England

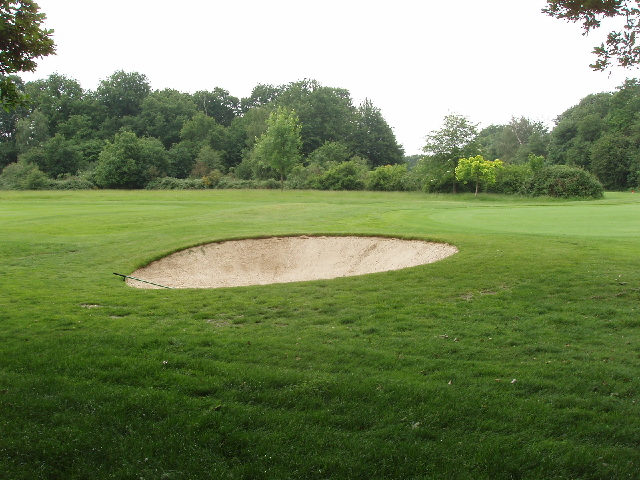

- Location within Buckinghamshire
- 51°33′14″N 0°38′34″W

Club information
- Location: Burnham, Buckinghamshire, England
- Established: 1891
- Tota holes: 18
- Designed by: J.H. Taylor
- Par: 70
- Length: 6,458 yards (5,905 m)

Burnham Beeches Golf Club is a golf club, located in Burnham, Buckinghamshire, England. Established in 1891, it is the oldest golf club in Buckinghamshire.

Burnham Beeches' 18-hole golf course was built on land owned by the City of London Corporation. In 1909 the land was bought by Lord Burnham and leased to the club. It continued to be leased from the Burnham Trust until 2014, when the club purchased the land outright. Early in the twentieth century, J.H. Taylor was consulted on changes to the course.

In 1984, Burnham Beeches hosted the White Horse Whisky Challenge, a tournament on the WPGA circuit, which later became known as the Ladies European Tour. The winner of the tournament was Federica Dassù of Italy.
