= Burnham railway station =

Railway station serving the village of Burnham, Buckinghamshire, England

Burnham
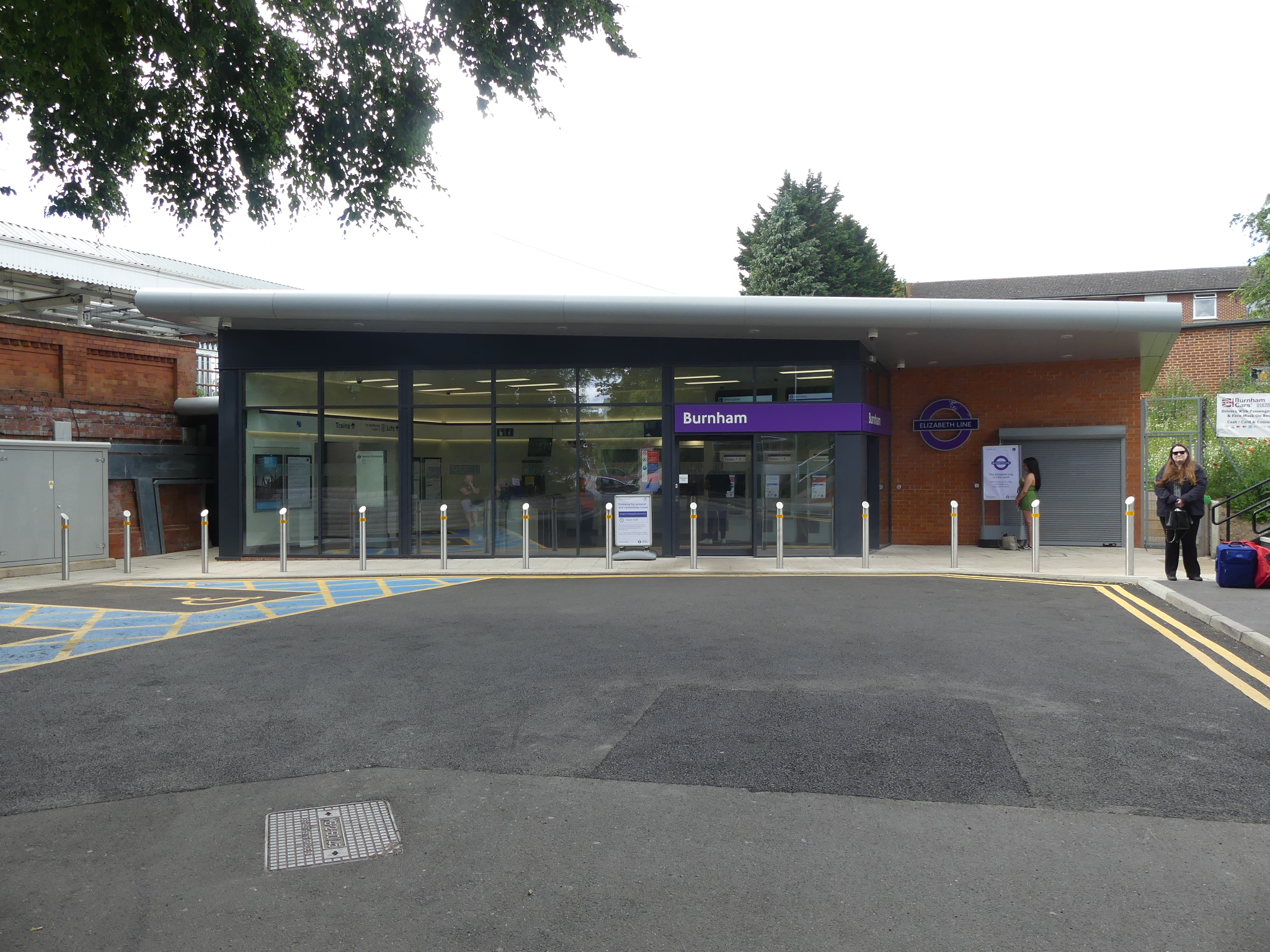
- Station entrance seen in June 2022
- Interactive map of Burnham

General information
- Location: Burnham
- Local authority: Slough
- Grid reference: SU940813
- Managed by: Elizabeth line
- Owner: Network Rail
- Station code: BNM
- DfT category: E
- Number of platforms: 2
- Tracks: 4
- Accessible: Yes

National Rail annual entry and exit
- 2020–21: ▼0.388 million
- 2021–22: ▲0.919 million
- 2022–23: ▲1.258 million
- 2023–24: ▲1.566 million
- 2024–25: ▲1.726 million

Railway companies
- Original company: Great Western Railway
- Pre-grouping: Great Western Railway
- Post-grouping: Great Western Railway

Key dates
- 1 July 1899: Opened as Burnham Beeches
- 2 April 1917: Closed
- 3 March 1919: Reopened
- 1 September 1930: Renamed Burnham (Bucks)
- 5 May 1975: Renamed Burnham

Other information
- External links: Departures; Facilities
- Coordinates: 51.524°N 0.646°W

Burnham railway station is a railway station serving Burnham, Buckinghamshire, England, 20 miles 77 chains (33.7 km) from London Paddington and situated between Slough to the east and Taplow to the west. The station is in Haymill, a ward of western Slough, about half a mile to the south of Burnham proper. Originally in Buckinghamshire, the station transferred into the county of Berkshire when county boundaries were realigned in 1974.

The station is served by local services operated by the Elizabeth line. The station is on the Great Western Main Line, the original line of the Great Western Railway.

== History ==
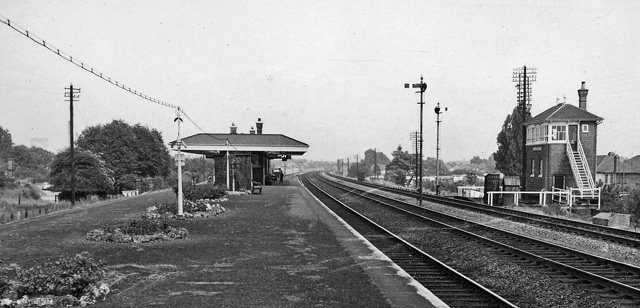
View eastward, towards Paddington in 1961

On opening on 1 July 1899, the station was named Burnham Beeches, becoming Burnham (Bucks) from 1 September 1930 to 5 May 1975, and then purely Burnham, although National Rail variously refers to the station as Burnham (Bucks) and Burnham (Berks). The station was closed as a First World War economy measure from 2 April 1917 to 3 March 1919.

In preparation for the introduction of Elizabeth line services, the operation of the station was transferred to TfL Rail (now the Elizabeth line) on behalf of Transport for London at the end of 2017.

== Location ==
The station is situated about half a mile south of Burnham Village and around a mile north of the village of Cippenham and is the closest station to Slough Trading Estate.

== Facilities ==
Burnham Railway Station has a fully staffed ticket office which is open seven days a week. There are three self-service ticket machines inside the ticket office, which opened in 2022.

The station has a waiting room which is open during ticket office opening hours. Seating is also available under canopies on each platform.

Car parking facilities are around 100 metres away, in a car park operated by APCOA. Parking permits are sold to ticket holders individually from the station, or season ticket holders may purchase tickets from APCOA.

== Services ==
Off-peak, all services at Burnham are operated by the Elizabeth line using Class 345 EMUs.

The typical off-peak service in trains per hour (tph) is:

- 4 tph to Abbey Wood
- 4 tph to Maidenhead of which 2 continue to Reading

Additional services call at the station during the peak hours, increasing the service to up to 6 tph in each direction.

The station is also served by a small number of early morning and late evening Great Western Railway services between London Paddington and Reading.

Preceding station	Elizabeth line	Following station
Taplow towards Reading	Elizabeth line	Slough towards Abbey Wood
National Rail
Taplow	Great Western Railway Great Western Main Line Limited Service	Slough
