= Bret Freeman =

American martial artis ring announcer

Bret "Hollywood" Freeman (born September 15, 1966 in Harbor City, Los Angeles) is an American/British MMA ring announcer. He works for many major Boxing and MMA promotions across Europe and the Middle East including Goodwin Promotions, Matchroom, Cage Rage UK's Ultimate Challenge, Cage Warriors, Cage Contender, IFPA and others. He is known for his flamboyant dress and his trademark catch phrase "It's Go Time". He has been seen on live and pre-recorded televised MMA events in more than 70 countries.

== Announcing career ==
Freeman started his announcing career in 2009, for small, regional MMA shows in the United Kingdom. His first job was with KAYO MMA, a promotion based in Watford, England. From there, he was contracted to Bushido Challenge, then MMA Clinic. His big break came in 2010, for one of the UK's largest MMA organisations, Ultimate Challenge. in 2013, he was licensed by the British Boxing Board of Control and began announcing for BBBofC Boxing events. He changed his stage name to Bret Hollywood in 2014.

He then regularly worked for UCMMA, Cage Warriors, Cage Contender and International Fighting & Promotions Alliance.

Bret has provided the following services across various promotions:

- Matchroom Boxing
- Matchroom Snooker
- Goodwin Promotions

IFPA MMA- International Fighting & Promotions Alliance -Ring Announcer/MC -Presenter

- Ultimate Challenge MMA -Ring Announcer/MC
- Cage Contender -Ring Announcer/MC
- Cage Warriors -Ring Announcer/MC -Presenter
- OMMAC -Ring Announcer/MC
- London KO -Ring Announcer/MC -presenter
- KnuckleUp -Ring Announcer/MC
- MMA Clinic -Ring Announcer/MC -presenter
- Bushido Challenge -Ring Announcer/MC -presenter
- KAYO MMA -Ring Announcer/MC -presenter
- BAMMA -Commentator and post production voice over
- MMA Clinic -Commentator
- Bushido Challenge -Commentator
- Trojan MMA -Commentator
- KnuckleUp -Commentator
- KAYO MMA -Commentator
- Miss Great Britain -MC

== Trademark ==
Bret began using "It's Go Time" to introduce the main event early in 2010, and was awarded a trademark by the World International Patent Office in November 2010. His work in Sports communication and trademark efforts have been noted by ESPN and in Strategic Sports Communication 2nd Edition by Pedersen, Paul M., Laucella, Pamela, Kian, Edward, Geurin, Andrea. Late in 2014 Bret moved away from this trademark.

== Television work ==
Freeman hosts the weekly Sports Tonight Live MMA magazine show, "The Cage", has presented several local MMA programmes for LA Muscle and the Active Channel (including "KAYO MMA") and was a featured colour commentator on Bravo for BAMMA.

He was a frequent guest on the My Channel MMA Lifestyle show, Wartime TV in the UK. He was a part of their feature, "Hollywood Cribs", which documented a tour of his home in Buckinghamshire, England.

Freeman was a featured character on Sky Atlantic series The Guest Wing.

Bret Hollywood (Freeman) was featured on the Channel 4 series Come Dine With Me.

Freeman and his wife Julia have been featured on the Sky Sports MMA talk show, Cage Fighter.

As resident ring announcer for Cage Rage UK, Ultimate Challenge MMA, Bret was part of the first UK-based pay-per-view event, Cage Rage UK Presents Ultimate Challenge, Warriors Creed: Alex Reid vs Jason Barrett, which was shown live on Premier Sports, 7 August 2011.
