= Dropmore Park =

Country house in Buckinghamshire, England

Coordinates: 51.5655°N 0.6645°W

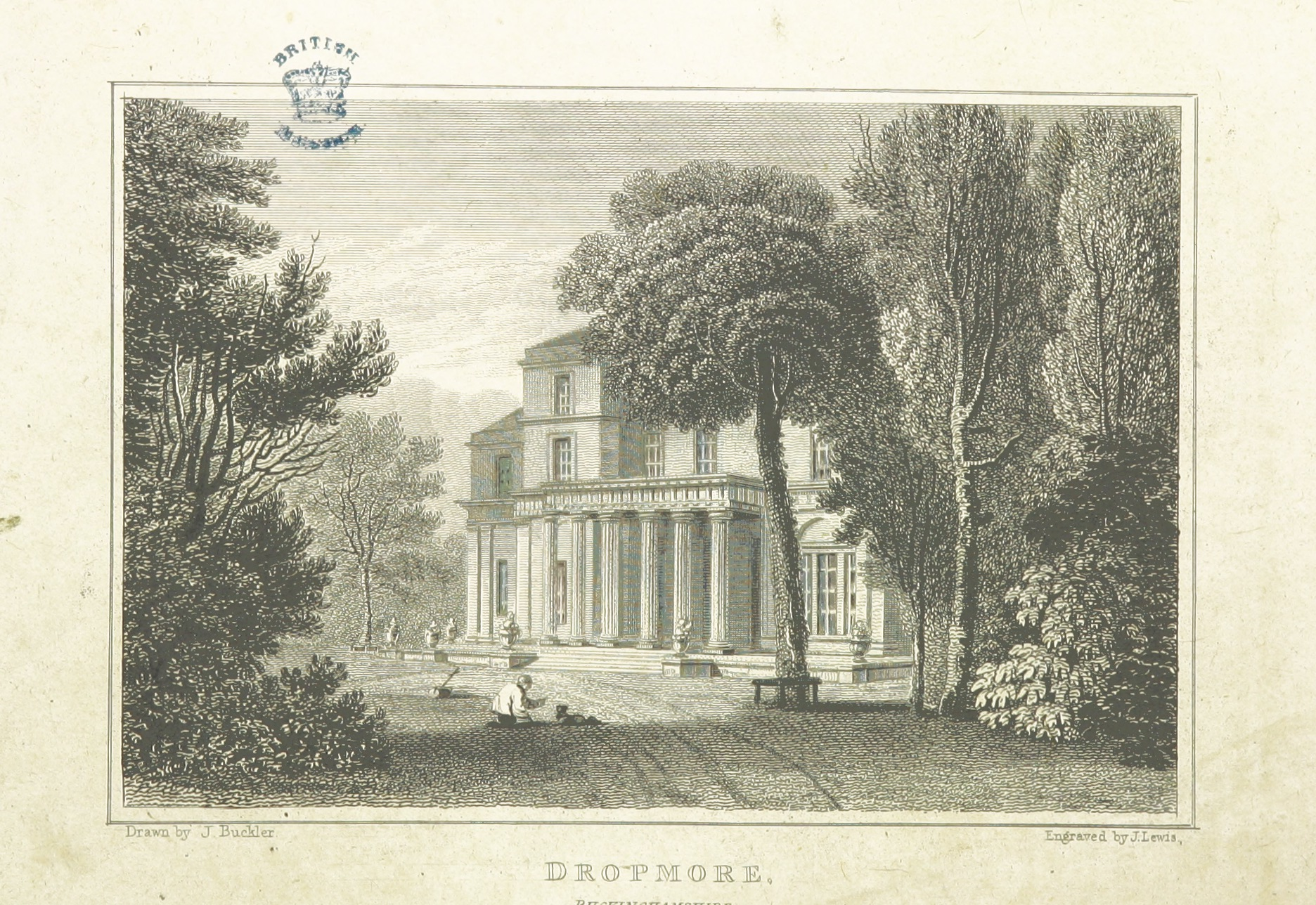
Dropmore in 1818

Dropmore Park is a private estate located along Dropmore Road, north of Burnham, Buckinghamshire, England, about 220 acres (89 ha) in size. The park with its buildings, including Dropmore House, have Grade I listed building status.

== Location ==
Dropmore Park is located in the Thames Valley near to the wood known as Burnham Beeches. It is about 25 miles (40 km) west of the centre of London and about 3 miles (4.8 km) south of junction 2 of the M40 motorway and about 4 miles (6.4 km) north of junction 7 of the M4 motorway. The nearest main towns are High Wycombe, Windsor, Maidenhead and Slough. Close neighbouring grand estates and stately homes include Cliveden and Hedsor House. The house and estate are not normally open to members of the public.

== History ==
Dropmore House was built in the 1790s for Lord Grenville, who later as Prime Minister pushed through the law abolishing the slave trade. The architect was Samuel Wyatt. Charles Tatham was architect for changes in the 19th century.

Grenville knew the spot from rambles during his time at Eton College, and prized its distant views of his old school and of Windsor Castle. On his first day in occupation, he planted two cedar trees. At least another 2,500 trees were planted. By the time Grenville died in 1834, his pinetum contained the biggest collection of conifer species in Britain. Part of the restoration is to use what survives as the basis for a collection of some 200 species.

In 1945, after wartime use during which it was harshly treated, the house was restored by Viscount Kemsley, the proprietor of The Sunday Times. He filled it with paintings, furniture and books. After his death in 1968 it was sold to United States International University and then to the Ambassador of the United Arab Emirates, Muhammed Mahdi al-Tajir.

An indoor pool was added, but the house was rarely used. In 1990 it was badly damaged by a fire that took four days to put out. Another in 1997 left the house uninhabitable.

Dropmore was restored by the company Corporate Estates via the construction firm MP Brothers Limited into a number of private luxury dwellings around 2006–2008. The restoration included the house, Edwardian stables and a number of garden buildings including a Chinese tea house and aviary. Further plans over a 15-year period include restoration of the formal flower beds, Italian garden, woodlands, lawns, vistas, roads, bridges and gates. The developer has since gone into liquidation before the redevelopment was completed. Dropmore was then purchased in 2012 by Richard and Ian Livingstone.

The exterior of the house and the grounds were used extensively for the location filming of the Doctor Who serial Day of the Daleks (1972).
