= Elizabeth line =

Railway in London, England

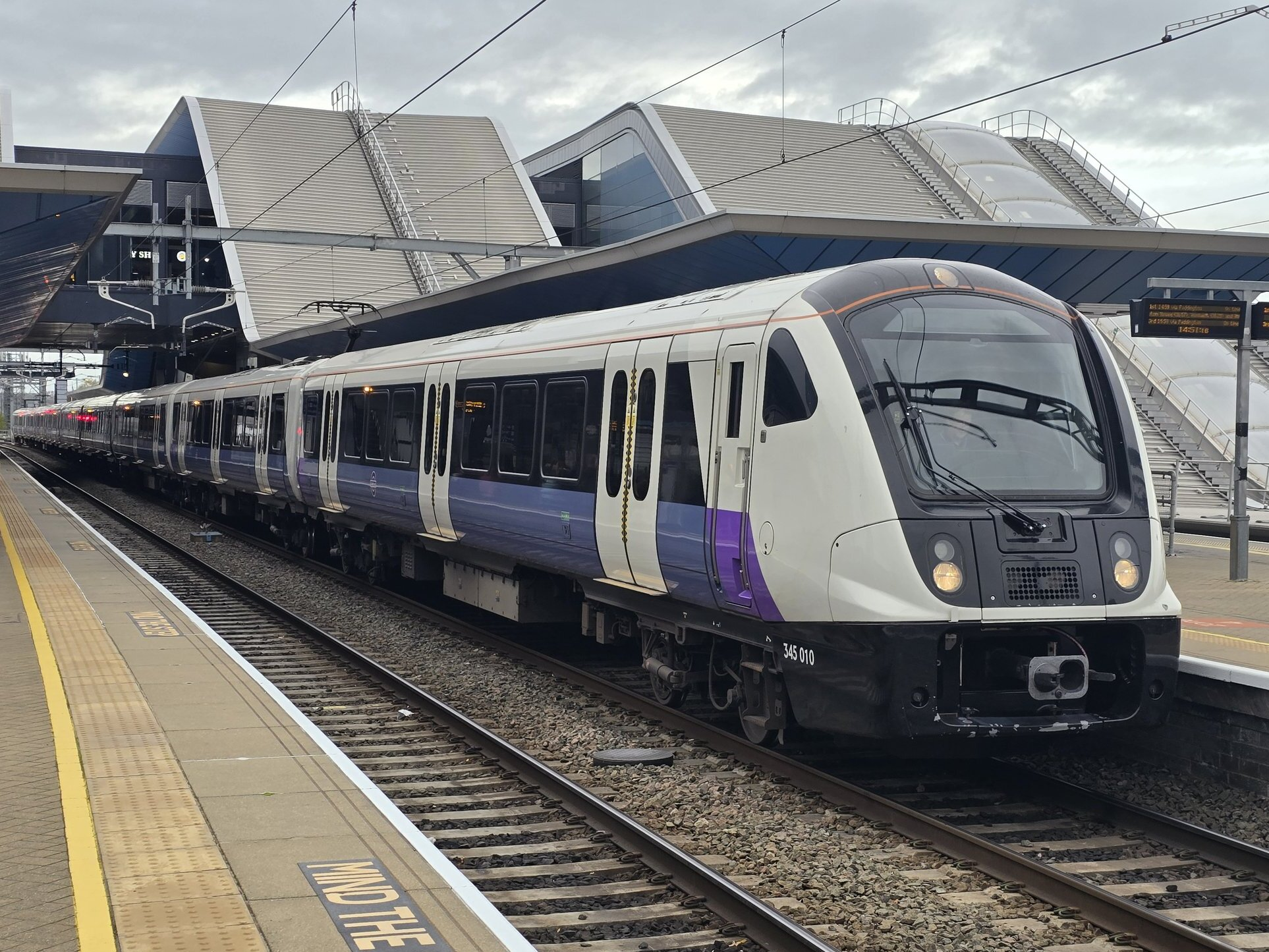
- An Elizabeth line Class 345 train at Reading

Overview
- System: National Rail
- Locale: Greater London; Berkshire; Buckinghamshire; Essex
- Predecessor: TfL Rail
- First service: 24 May 2022; 4 years ago
- Current operator: GTS Rail Operations (under concession from TfL)
- Annual ridership: 243 million ▲10% (2024/2025) passenger journeys
- Website: tfl.gov.uk/modes/elizabeth-line/

Route
- Termini: West: Heathrow Terminal 4, Heathrow Terminal 5 and Reading; East: Abbey Wood and Shenfield
- Stops: 41
- Distance travelled: 117 km (73 mi)

Technical
- Rolling stock: Class 345
- Track gauge: 1,435 mm (4 ft 8 1/2 in) standard gauge
- Electrification: Overhead line, 25 kV 50 Hz AC
- Operating speed: Core section: 95 km/h (60 mph); GWML, Heathrow and GEML: 145 km/h (90 mph)
- Track owners: Transport for London (Old Oak Common–Abbey Wood and Stratford); Network Rail (Pudding Mill Lane–Shenfield, and Old Oak Common–Reading); Heathrow Airport Holdings (Heathrow branch)
Transport for London rail lines
London Underground
Bakerloo
Central
Circle
District
Hammersmith & City
Jubilee
Metropolitan
Northern
Piccadilly
Victoria
Waterloo & City
London Overground
Liberty
Lioness
Mildmay
Suffragette
Weaver
Windrush
Other TfL Modes
DLR
Elizabeth line
London Trams

The Elizabeth line is a railway line that runs across Greater London and nearby towns. It runs services on dedicated infrastructure in central London from the Great Western Main Line west of Paddington station to Abbey Wood and via Whitechapel to the Great Eastern Main Line near Stratford; and out parallel to the Great Eastern Main Line to Shenfield in the east, along the Great Western Main Line to Reading and Heathrow Airport in the west.

Under the project name of Crossrail, the system was approved in 2007, and construction began in 2009. Originally planned to open in 2018, the project was repeatedly delayed, including for several months as a result of the COVID-19 pandemic. The service is named after Queen Elizabeth II, who officially opened the line on 17 May 2022 during her Platinum Jubilee year; passenger services started on 24 May 2022.

Elizabeth line services are operated by GTS Rail Operations under a concession from Transport for London (TfL). TfL considers the line to be a distinct service, rather than part of the London Underground. It is considered to be in a class of its own and TfL's Oyster card is not valid for journeys to stations outside the TfL fare zones, whilst a premium fare is charged to passengers travelling to or from Heathrow Airport, in line with that charged on the Heathrow Connect service which it replaced.

The line performs a similar function in London to the RER in Paris and the S-Bahn systems of German-speaking countries. It reached over 200 million trips annually in its second year of operation and carries one seventh of all trips by rail in the United Kingdom.

== History ==
In 2001, Cross London Rail Links (CLRL), a 50/50 joint-venture between Transport for London (TfL) and the Department for Transport (DfT), was formed to develop and promote the Crossrail scheme, and also a Wimbledon–Hackney scheme, Crossrail 2. In 2003 and 2004, over 50 days of exhibitions were held to explain the proposals at over 30 different locations.

=== 2005 route development ===
In 2005, ahead of Crossrail's hybrid bill submission, a number of feeder routes were considered by CLRL west of Paddington and east of Liverpool Street. It was viewed, given the 24 trains-per-hour (tph) core frequency, that two feeder routes, each of 12 tph, could be taken forward.

In the west, a route to Maidenhead (later extended to Reading) and Heathrow Airport was selected. In the east, routes to Abbey Wood (curtailed from Ebbsfleet to avoid conflicts with the North Kent lines) and Shenfield were selected.

=== Approval ===
The Crossrail Act 2008 authorising the construction project received royal assent on 22 July 2008. In December 2008, TfL and the DfT announced that they had signed the "Crossrail Sponsors' Agreement". This committed them to financing the project, then projected to cost £15.9 billion, with further contributions from Network Rail, BAA, and the City of London.

=== Construction ===
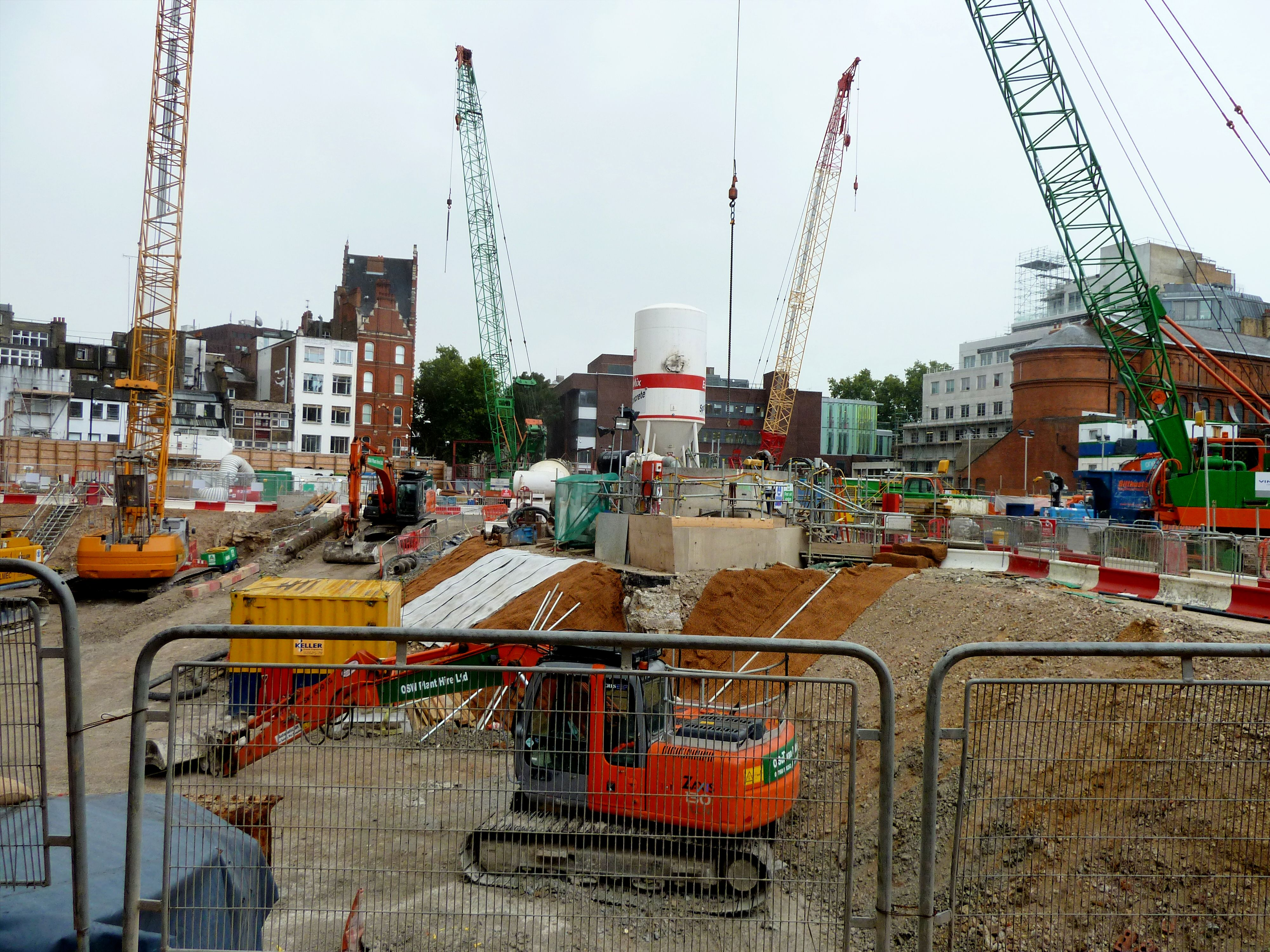
Construction of Crossrail at Tottenham Court Road in 2011

Work began on 15 May 2009, when piling works started at the future Canary Wharf station.

Boring of the railway tunnels was officially completed in June 2015. Installation of the track was completed in September 2017. The European Train Control System (ETCS) signalling was scheduled to be tested in the Heathrow tunnels over the winter of 2017–2018.

At the end of August 2018, four months before the scheduled opening of the core section of the line, it was announced that completion was delayed and that the line would not open before autumn 2019. After multiple delays, in August 2020 Crossrail announced that the central section would be ready to open "in the first half of 2022".

In May 2021, trial running commenced.

On 17 May 2022, the line was officially opened by Queen Elizabeth II in honour of her Platinum Jubilee. She was not scheduled to attend the event, but decided to attend with her son, Prince Edward, to unveil the plaque commemorating the official opening.

=== Timeline ===
Though the main tunnels under central London had not yet been opened, passenger operations on the outer branches of the future Elizabeth line were transferred to TfL for inclusion in the concession – this took place over several stages beginning May 2015. During this initial phase of operation, services were operated by MTR Crossrail under the TfL Rail brand. Following the practice adopted during the transfer of former Silverlink services to London Overground in 2007, TfL carried out a deep clean of stations and trains on the future Elizabeth line route, installed new ticket machines and barriers, introduced Oyster card and contactless payment, and ensured all stations were staffed. Existing rolling stock was rebranded with the TfL Rail identity.

TfL Rail and Elizabeth line services
Stage	Map	Completion dates			Notes
Stage	Map	Schedule	Actual	Delay	Notes
0	Map of the first phase of Crossrail 2015	May 2015	31 May 2015	—	Existing "metro" service between Liverpool Street (main line station) and Shenfield transferred from Abellio Greater Anglia to TfL Rail
1	Map of the first phase of Crossrail 2015	May 2017	22 June 2017	1 month	Class 345 trains start running between Liverpool Street and Shenfield in reduced length format
2a	Map of the 2nd phase of Crossrail in 2018	May 2018	20 May 2018	—	Existing service between Paddington (main line station) and Heathrow Terminal 4 transferred from Heathrow Connect; Existing shuttle service between Heathrow Terminals 2 & 3 and Heathrow Terminal 4 transferred from Heathrow Express, both to TfL Rail
5a	Map of Crossrail with Reading section	—N/a	15 December 2019	—	Most stopping services between Paddington and Reading transferred from Great Western Railway to TfL Rail, operating up to 4 tph; The first TfL trains in public service to Reading ran on 25 November 2019 as a soft launch of the service.
2b	Map of the 2nd phase of Crossrail in 2018	May 2018	30 July 2020	2 years and 2 months	Class 345 trains start running between Paddington and Heathrow
4a	Map of the first phase of Crossrail 2015	—N/a	26 May 2021	—	Class 345 trains in full length format start running between Liverpool Street and Shenfield
3	Map of the 3rd phase of Crossrail 2018	Dec 2018	24 May 2022	3 years and 5 months	Services between Paddington and Abbey Wood begin; this section and existing TfL Rail routes rebranded as the Elizabeth line, up to 12 tph
4b/5b	Map of the 5th phase of Crossrail 2019	—N/a	6 November 2022	—	Services begin between Paddington and Shenfield; and between Reading and Abbey Wood; and between Heathrow and Abbey Wood. The services are operated in parallel, sharing the central tunnel.
5c	Map of the 5th phase of Crossrail 2019	Dec 2019	21 May 2023	3 years and 5 months	Full route opens, with services between Heathrow and both Abbey Wood and Shenfield; and between Reading and Abbey Wood.

== Route ==
The Elizabeth line runs on an east–west axis across the London region, with branches terminating at Abbey Wood and Shenfield in the east, and at Heathrow Terminal 4, Heathrow Terminal 5 and Reading in the west. There are 41 stations. In the central section, there are interchanges with London Underground, National Rail, and Docklands Light Railway lines.

Map

The Elizabeth line in the London transport network

Geographical map

Schematic map (interactive)

Routes of the Elizabeth line (in purple, from middle of left edge to right edge), shown with London Underground and the Docklands Light Railway connections

== Design and infrastructure ==
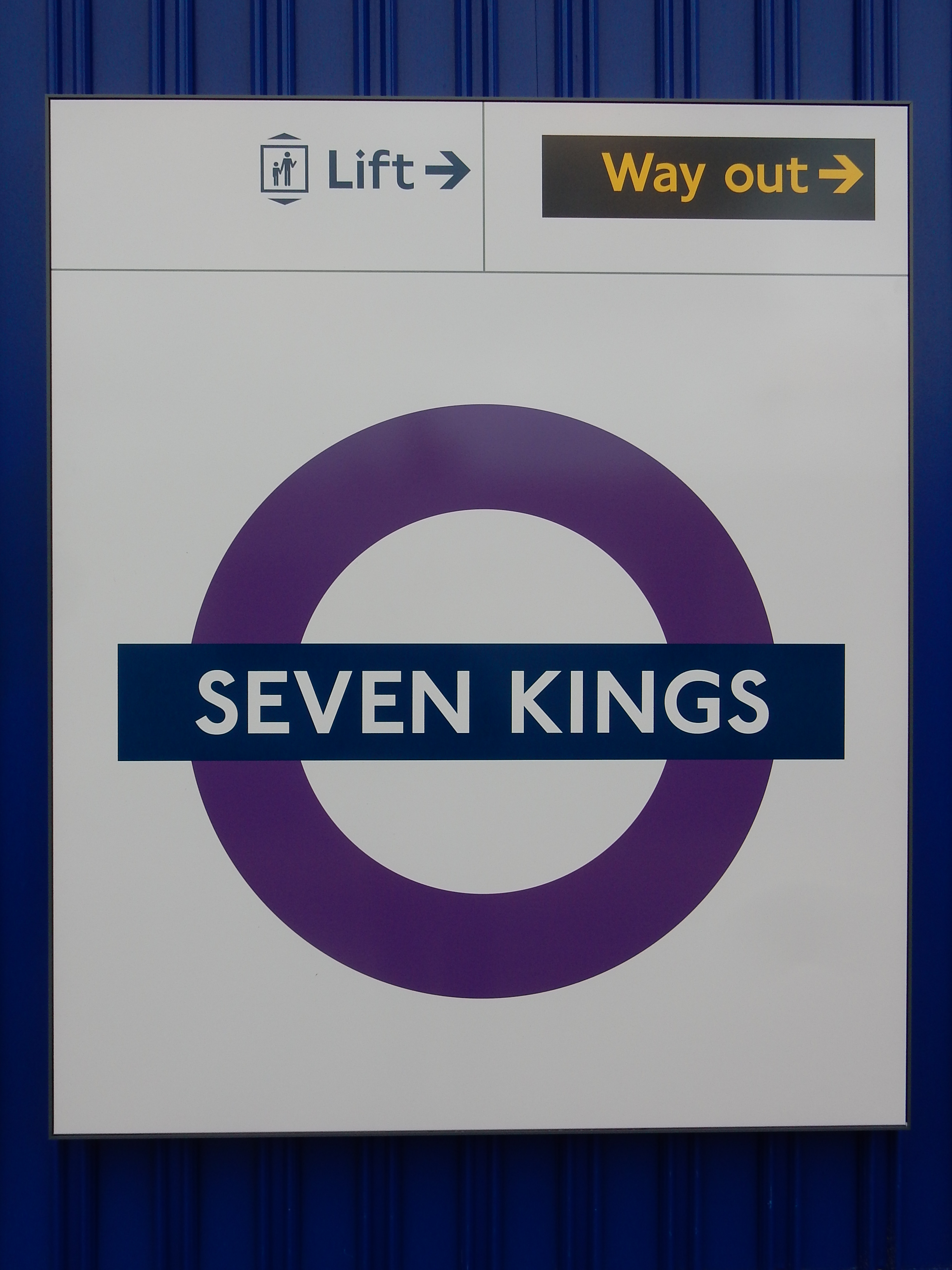
Elizabeth line roundel on a sign for Seven Kings station

=== Name and identity ===
Crossrail is the name of the construction project and of the limited company, wholly owned by TfL, that was formed to carry out construction works.

The "Elizabeth line" is the name of the new service that is on signage throughout the stations. It is named in honour of Queen Elizabeth II, and colloquially called the "Lizzie line". The Elizabeth line roundel is coloured purple, with a superimposed blue bearing white text in the same style as London Underground and other TfL services. However, unlike other services, the Elizabeth line roundel features the line name rather than the mode of transport (i.e. Underground, Overground, Buses).

TfL Rail was an intermediate brand name which was introduced in May 2015 and discontinued in May 2022. It was used by TfL on services between Paddington and Heathrow Terminal 5 and Reading, as well as trains between Liverpool Street and Shenfield.

=== Stations ===
Elizabeth line station information
Station	Image	Managed by	Line section	TfL service began	Interchanges
Reading		Network Rail	Reading branch	15 December 2019	CrossCountry; GWR; SWR
Twyford		Great Western Railway	Reading branch	15 December 2019	GWR
Maidenhead		Great Western Railway	Reading branch	15 December 2019	GWR
Taplow		Elizabeth line	Reading branch	15 December 2019	
Burnham		Elizabeth line	Reading branch	15 December 2019	
Slough		Great Western Railway	Reading branch	15 December 2019	GWR
Langley		Elizabeth line	Reading branch	15 December 2019	
Iver		Elizabeth line	Reading branch	15 December 2019	
West Drayton		Elizabeth line	Reading branch	15 December 2019	
Heathrow Terminal 5		Heathrow Express	Heathrow branch	9 May 2020	Heathrow Express; Piccadilly line
Heathrow Terminal 4		Heathrow Express	Heathrow branch	20 May 2018	
Heathrow Terminals 2 & 3		Heathrow Express	Heathrow branch	20 May 2018	Heathrow Express
Hayes & Harlington		Elizabeth line	Reading and Heathrow branches	20 May 2018	
Southall		Elizabeth line	Reading and Heathrow branches	20 May 2018	
Hanwell		Elizabeth line	Heathrow branch (Note: Reading branch services skip Hanwell, West Ealing, and Acton Main Line stations)	20 May 2018	
West Ealing		Elizabeth line	Heathrow branch	20 May 2018	GWR
Ealing Broadway		Elizabeth line	Reading and Heathrow branches	20 May 2018	Central line; District line
Acton Main Line		Elizabeth line	Heathrow branch	20 May 2018	
Paddington (Note: Some early-morning and late-night services instead use the National Rail terminal platforms)		Elizabeth line (through station); Network Rail (terminal station)	Core	24 May 2022 (Note: Services using the National Rail terminal platforms commenced on 20 May 2018)	GWR; Heathrow Express; Bakerloo line (Note: From Paddington (Bakerloo, Circle, and District) tube station); Circle line (Note: From Paddingdon (Circle and Hammersmith & City) tube station); District line; Hammersmith & City line
Bond Street		London Underground	Core	24 October 2022	Central line; Jubilee line
Tottenham Court Road		London Underground	Core	24 May 2022	Central line; Northern line
Farringdon		London Underground	Core	24 May 2022	Thameslink; Circle line; Hammersmith & City line; Metropolitan line
Liverpool Street (Note: Some early-morning, late-night, and peak-time services instead use the National Rail terminal platforms)		Elizabeth line (through station); Network Rail (terminal station)	Core	24 May 2022 (Note: Services using the National Rail terminal platforms commenced on 31 May 2015)	c2c (Note: Only limited service); Greater Anglia; Great Northern (Note: From Moorgate station); Weaver line; Central line; Circle line; Hammersmith & City line; Metropolitan line; Northern line
Whitechapel		London Underground	Core	24 May 2022	Windrush line; District line; Hammersmith & City line
Canary Wharf		Elizabeth line	Abbey Wood branch	24 May 2022	Jubilee line (Note: From Canary Wharf tube station); Docklands Light Railway (Note: From Canary Wharf, Poplar, and West India Quay DLR stations)
Custom House		Elizabeth line	Abbey Wood branch	24 May 2022	Docklands Light Railway
Woolwich		Elizabeth line	Abbey Wood branch	24 May 2022	Southeastern (Note: From Woolwich Arsenal station); Thameslink; Docklands Light Railway
Abbey Wood		Elizabeth line	Abbey Wood branch	24 May 2022	Southeastern; Thameslink
Stratford		Elizabeth line	Shenfield branch	31 May 2015	c2c; Greater Anglia; Mildmay line; Central line; Jubilee line; Docklands Light Railway
Maryland		Elizabeth line	Shenfield branch	31 May 2015	
Forest Gate		Elizabeth line	Shenfield branch	31 May 2015	Suffragette line (Note: From Wanstead Park station)
Manor Park		Elizabeth line	Shenfield branch	31 May 2015	
Ilford		Elizabeth line	Shenfield branch	31 May 2015	
Seven Kings		Elizabeth line	Shenfield branch	31 May 2015	
Goodmayes		Elizabeth line	Shenfield branch	31 May 2015	
Chadwell Heath		Elizabeth line	Shenfield branch	31 May 2015	
Romford		Elizabeth line	Shenfield branch	31 May 2015	Greater Anglia; Liberty line
Gidea Park		Elizabeth line	Shenfield branch	31 May 2015	
Harold Wood		Elizabeth line	Shenfield branch	31 May 2015	
Brentwood		Elizabeth line	Shenfield branch	31 May 2015	
Shenfield		Greater Anglia	Shenfield branch	31 May 2015	Greater Anglia

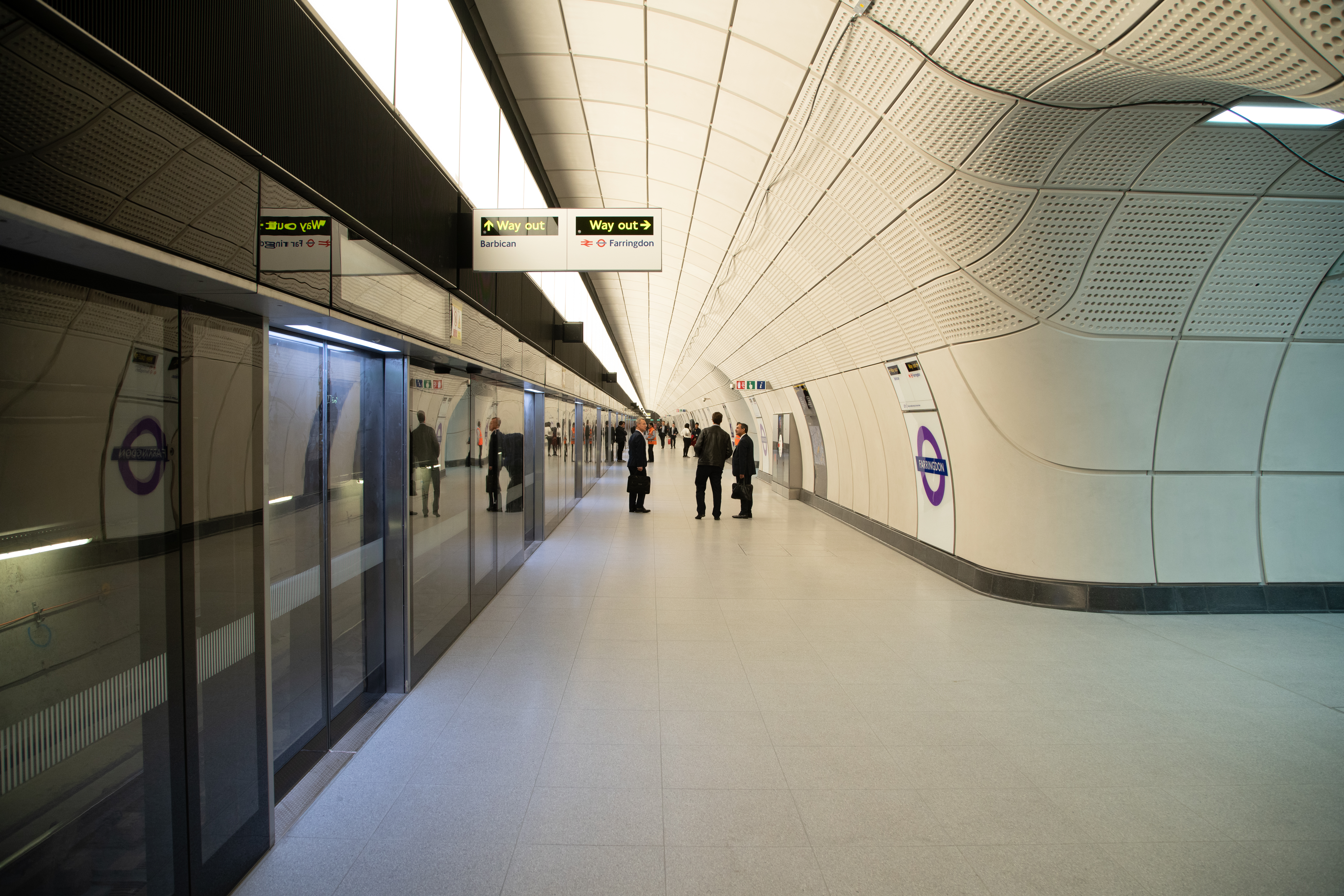
Elizabeth line platforms at Farringdon

Ten new stations have been built in the central and south east sections of the line, and 31 existing stations were upgraded and refurbished. Nine of the ten new-build stations opened for revenue service on 24 May 2022; the remaining station – Bond Street – required additional finishing works before commissioning could proceed. Trains passed through its platforms non-stop until it opened five months later on 24 October. All stations are equipped with CCTV and because of the length of trains, central stations have train indicators above the platform-edge doors.

All 41 stations are step-free from street to platform. Thirteen stations (the central and Heathrow stations) have level access between trains and platforms while other outer suburban platforms remain at their pre-existing height, about 200 millimetres (7.9 in) lower. This platform height difference was criticised by the Campaign for Level Boarding who said Crossrail's "poor decision making" meant "this brand-new railway has cornered itself into perpetually offering an inaccessible service."

Although the trains are 200 metres (660 feet) long, platforms at the new stations in the central core are built to enable 240-metre-long (790 ft) trains in case of possible future need. In the eastern section, Maryland and Manor Park have not had platform extensions, so trains use selective door opening instead. At Maryland this is because of the prohibitive cost of extensions and the poor business case, and at Manor Park it is due to the presence of a freight loop that would otherwise be cut off.

The new subterranean stations were designed by Grimshaw Architects, adopting a uniform approach across all stations, in partnership with engineering firm AtkinsRéalis; way-finding was designed by Maynard and lighting designed by Equation.

==== Future stations ====
As of 2026, Old Oak Common railway station is under construction. It will provide an interchange with the High Speed 2 service.

Station	Image	Line section	Opening	Interchanges
Old Oak Common	—N/a	Core	c. 2030	Avanti West Coast; GWR; Heathrow Express

=== Rolling stock ===
==== Current rolling stock ====
Class	Image	Type	Top speed		Carriages	Number	Routes operated	Built	Years in operation
Class	Image	Type	mph	km/h	Carriages	Number	Routes operated	Built	Years in operation
Class 345 Aventra		EMU	90	145	9	70	All services	2015–2019; 2025–present	June 2017–present

==== Former rolling stock ====
Class	Image	Type	Top speed		Carriages	Number	Routes operated	Built	Years in operation
Class	Image	Type	mph	km/h	Carriages	Number	Routes operated	Built	Years in operation
Class 315		EMU	75	120	4	20	Liverpool Street – Shenfield	1980–1981	1980–December 2022

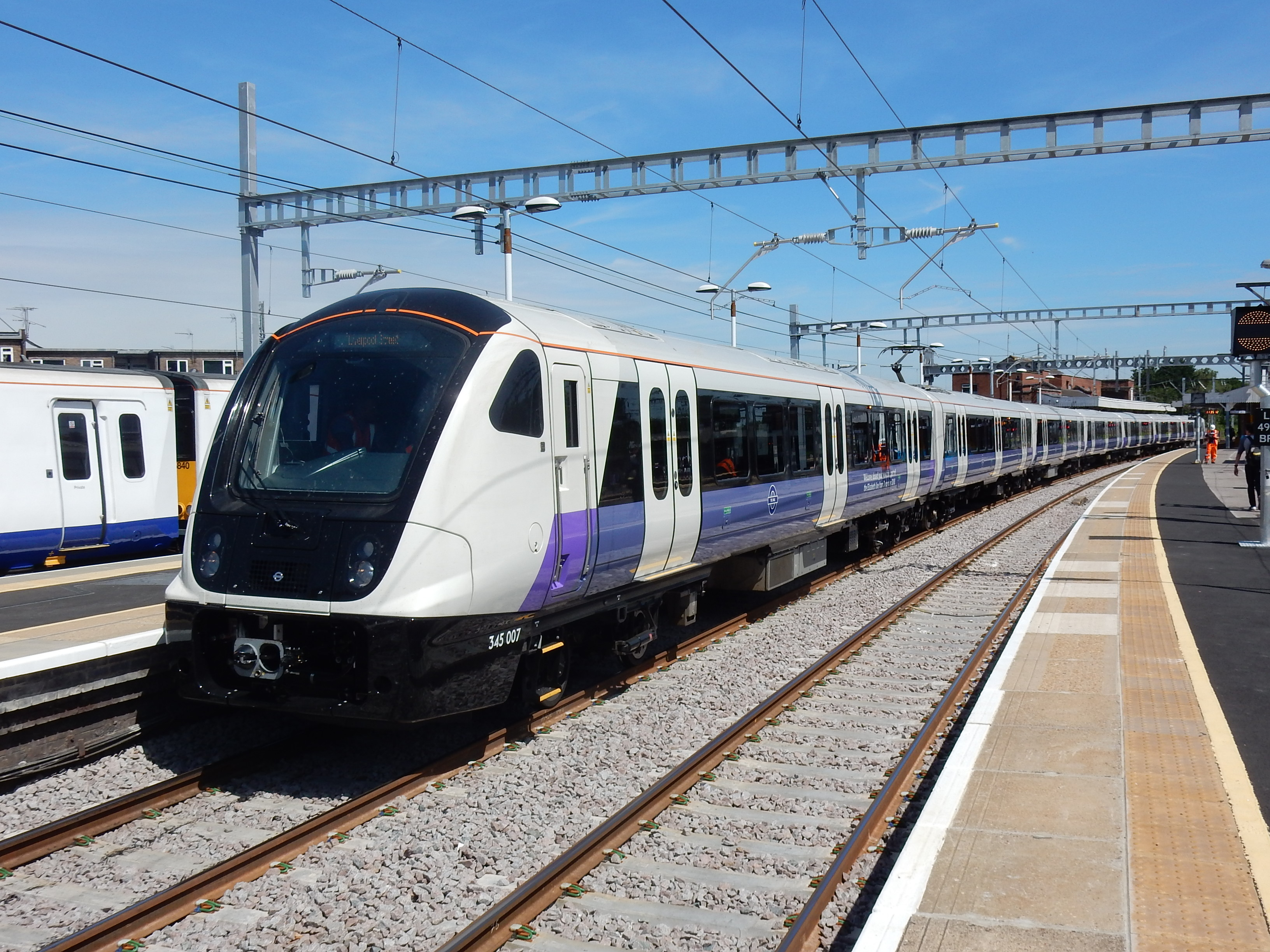
Class 345 unit at Shenfield in 2017

Services on the Elizabeth line are operated exclusively by a fleet of nine-car Class 345 trains that was procured especially for this purpose. The service specifications called for approximately 60 trains, of which 57 would be in service at any one time, each 200 metres (660 feet) long and capable of carrying up to 1,500 passengers. In March 2011, Crossrail indicated that five bidders had been shortlisted as potential suppliers of both the new fleet and its depot facilities; Alstom, CAF, Siemens Mobility, Hitachi Rail, and Bombardier Transportation – although Alstom withdrew four months later. Crossrail issued invitations to negotiate to the remaining bidders in March 2012, with submission of tenders expected between June and August. It was stipulated that bidders should offer a fleet based on technology that was "already developed", with the expectation that an "evolutionary, not revolutionary" product would help to ensure "value for money" and "[the] utmost reliability from day one". Siemens withdrew their rolling stock bid in July 2013, citing an increase in other business and a need to protect their "ability to deliver ... current customer commitments", which included the £1.6 billion Class 700 order for Thameslink. Their contract to supply Crossrail's signalling and control systems was unaffected.

In December 2013, the European Investment Bank (EIB) agreed to provide TfL loans of up to £500 million to fund the rolling stock procurement, following TfL's decision in March of that year to abandon plans to cover most of the cost with private financing.

TfL and the DfT announced in early February 2014 that Bombardier's bid had been successful. The 32-year contract for the supply and maintenance of the trains and depot was valued at £1 billion. It included a firm order for 65 units from Bombardier's new Aventra family, plus an option for a further 18. The trains have air-conditioning and are designed to be as accessible as possible, including wide aisles and gangways, dedicated areas for wheelchairs, audio and visual announcements, CCTV, and passenger intercoms connected to the driver for use in the event of emergency. They will run at up to 90 mph (140 km/h) on certain parts of the route.

Owing to limited platform lengths at both Liverpool Street and Paddington National Rail stations, most Class 345 units were initially delivered as seven-car formations, then later extended to the intended nine. The first unit entered service on 22 June 2017, between Liverpool Street and Shenfield. TfL exercised an option to acquire a further five units in July 2017, bringing the total number on order to 70.

A number of Class 315 units that had been operating with TfL Rail remained in use on Elizabeth line services between Liverpool Street's terminal platforms and Shenfield alongside Class 345 units while the introduction of the new fleet – including the extension to nine-car formations – was completed. The Class 315 units, which had been built for British Rail in 1980–1981, could not be used in the line's core section. The final four were withdrawn from service on 9 December 2022.

==== Future stock ====
Following the opening of the Elizabeth line, TfL experienced high passenger growth on the line. TfL noted that extra capacity would be required when Old Oak Common railway station opens in the 2030s alongside the opening of High Speed 2. TfL therefore pushed for funding from the DfT for additional trains. Following this, Alstom (new owners of the original builder Bombardier) was awarded a £370 million contract in June 2024 to build an additional ten Class 345 trains at its factory in Derby. This would increase the number of trains from 70 to 80.

=== Electrification and train protection ===
The Elizabeth line uses 25 kV, 50 Hz AC overhead lines, already in use on the Great Eastern and Great Western Main Lines.

The Heathrow branch started using the European Train Control System (ETCS) in 2020. The Automatic Warning System (AWS) and Train Protection & Warning System (TPWS) are used on the Great Western and Great Eastern Main Lines, with possible later upgrades to ETCS. Communications-based train control (CBTC) is installed in the central section and the Abbey Wood branch.

=== Depots ===
The Elizabeth line has depots in west London at Old Oak Common TMD, in south-east London at Plumstead Depot, and in east London at Ilford EMU Depot.

== Service pattern ==
=== Previous service ===
In May 2015, commuter services on a section of one of the eastern branches, between Liverpool Street and Shenfield, were transferred to TfL Rail; this precursor service also took control of Heathrow Connect in May 2018, and some local services on the Paddington to Reading line in December 2019. These services were augmented by a new central section in May 2022, and rebranded as the Elizabeth line. The outer services were connected to the central section in November 2022. Since May 2023, the central section has had up to 24 nine-carriage Class 345 trains per hour in each direction.

Upon opening, the line ran as three physically separate services: between Reading or Heathrow Airport and Paddington in the west; from Paddington via Liverpool Street to Abbey Wood in the centre; and between Liverpool Street and Shenfield in the east. To connect between services, a walk between the separate stations at Paddington or Liverpool Street was required. Operating hours were limited, as well as the service running Monday to Saturday only - allowing for further testing and software updates to take place. When through-running began in November 2022, there were two main service groups, overlapping through the core section: from Reading or Heathrow Airport to Abbey Wood; and from Paddington to Shenfield.

=== Current service ===
As of December 2024, the off-peak weekday service is as follows:

Elizabeth line off-peak weekday service
Route	tph	Calling at
Reading to Abbey Wood	2	Twyford; Maidenhead; Taplow; Burnham; Slough; Langley; West Drayton; Hayes & Harlington; Southall; Ealing Broadway; Paddington; Bond Street; Tottenham Court Road; Farringdon; Liverpool Street; Whitechapel; Canary Wharf; Custom House; Woolwich
Maidenhead to Abbey Wood	2	Burnham; Slough; Langley; Iver; West Drayton; Hayes & Harlington; Southall; Ealing Broadway; Paddington; Bond Street; Tottenham Court Road; Farringdon; Liverpool Street; Whitechapel; Canary Wharf; Custom House; Woolwich
Heathrow Terminal 4 to Abbey Wood	4	Heathrow Terminals 2 & 3; Hayes & Harlington; Southall; Hanwell; West Ealing; Ealing Broadway; Acton Main Line; Paddington; Bond Street; Tottenham Court Road; Farringdon; Liverpool Street; Whitechapel; Canary Wharf; Custom House; Woolwich
Heathrow Terminal 5 to Shenfield	2	Heathrow Terminals 2 & 3; Hayes & Harlington; West Ealing; Ealing Broadway; Paddington; Bond Street; Tottenham Court Road; Farringdon; Liverpool Street; Whitechapel; Stratford; Maryland; Forest Gate; Manor Park; Ilford; Seven Kings; Goodmayes; Chadwell Heath; Romford; Gidea Park; Harold Wood; Brentwood
Paddington to Shenfield	6	Bond Street; Tottenham Court Road; Farringdon; Liverpool Street; Whitechapel; Stratford; Maryland; Forest Gate; Manor Park; Ilford; Seven Kings; Goodmayes; Chadwell Heath; Romford; Gidea Park; Harold Wood; Brentwood

Some early morning and late night services run into Paddington mainline terminus instead of going through central London. Likewise, some early, peak-direction, and late trains run between Liverpool Street mainline terminus and Gidea Park, bypassing Whitechapel.

=== Journey times ===
Minutes between stations
Route	Pre-Elizabeth line time	Elizabeth line time
Paddington to Tottenham Court Road	20	4
Paddington to Canary Wharf	34	17
Bond Street to Paddington	15	3
Bond Street to Whitechapel	24	10
Canary Wharf to Liverpool Street	21	6
Canary Wharf to Heathrow	55	39
Whitechapel to Canary Wharf	13	3
Abbey Wood to Heathrow	93	52

== Operations ==
=== Operator ===
The Elizabeth line is currently operated by GTS Rail Operations, a train operating company owned by Go-Ahead Group, Tokyo Metro and Sumitomo Corporation. GTS took over operations from MTR Elizabeth line, the line's first operator, whose contract with TfL expired in May 2025. Following a model similar to that used for the Docklands Light Railway and London Overground, TfL invited tenders for operation of the Elizabeth line. Unlike other National Rail operators under the franchise control of the DfT, TfL sets fares, procures rolling stock and decides service levels. The operator takes only a small element of revenue risk, with TfL taking 90% and the operator 10%.

==== History ====
In June 2013, TfL announced that Arriva, MTR Corporation, Keolis / Go-Ahead Group and National Express had been shortlisted to bid for the concession to operate Crossrail, which was under construction. Prior to the opening of the central section, the concessionaire would operate the existing railway services using the TfL Rail brand. In July 2014, TfL awarded the contract to MTR Corporation, for a duration of eight years with an option to extend by an additional two years.

On 16 February 2024, TfL shortlisted four bidders – Arriva, a FirstGroup / Keolis joint venture, MTR Corporation and GTS Rail Operations (a consortium comprising Go-Ahead Group, Tokyo Metro and Sumitomo Corporation) – to operate the line from May 2025. In November 2024, GTS Rail Operations was chosen to operate the line from May 2025 for seven years with an optional two-year extension.

=== Ticketing ===
Ticketing is integrated with the other London transport systems, but Oyster pay as you go is not accepted on the western section between West Drayton (the limit of London fare zone 6) and Reading, with only contactless cards valid there. The concessionary travel Freedom Pass is valid for the whole length of the route, including stations outside London. The Elizabeth line is integrated with the London Underground, the wider TfL network and the National Rail networks; it is also included on the standard Tube map.

Journeys to or from Heathrow Airport are priced at a premium due to using the rail tunnel between the airport and Hayes & Harlington. That stretch of line is not part of the Network Rail system but owned by Heathrow Airport Holdings, who charge TfL an additional fee for each train that uses it. This fare is priced approximately halfway between the more expensive Heathrow Express and the standard zone 6 fare charged on the Underground. Heathrow is nevertheless included within the Travelcard scheme and daily/weekly fare capping as fare zone 6 stations.

=== Passenger numbers ===
Before the COVID-19 pandemic, the Elizabeth line was predicted to carry over 200 million passengers annually immediately after opening; this was expected to relieve pressure on London Underground's lines, especially the Central line. Farringdon is expected to become one of the busiest stations in the UK, due to it being the key interchange station with Thameslink services. In a business plan for the line published in January 2020, TfL predicted total annual revenues from the line of nearly £500 million per year in 2022/23 (its first full year of operation) and over £1 billion per year in 2024/25. By the time the line opened, TfL had reduced their passenger forecasts because passenger travelling habits changed during the pandemic; the estimate was between 130 and 170 million passengers by 2026. However, the Elizabeth line carried 62.2 million passengers in the last quarter of 2022 alone. That was one-sixth of the UK's total rail journeys, and double the number the line carried during the same period one year earlier. TFL later stated the line had carried over 150 million passengers in its first year of operation. By its second anniversary, more than 350 million trips had been made on the line, and it carried a seventh of all rail trips in the UK.

In the fiscal year ending March 2025, the line carried 243 million passengers, an increase of 10% on the previous year.

Number of passengers carried
Fiscal Year	Passengers (millions)	Source
2022/23	143.1	
2023/24	220.3	
2024/25	242.9	
2025/26	257.4	

== Further proposals ==
A new station has been proposed to serve London City Airport, and extensions have been put forward to Ebbsfleet in the south east, Milton Keynes in the north west, Staines in the south west, and Southend Airport in the east.

TfL has introduced high-speed 4G and 5G mobile coverage in the first tunnelled section of the Elizabeth line between Liverpool Street and Paddington. This initiative, part of a broader plan to extend coverage across the entire Tube and London Overground network, aims to improve connectivity.

== Honours and awards ==
In 2024, the Elizabeth line won the RIBA London Building of the Year award, and won the Stirling Prize for the same year. Muyiwa Oki, RIBA president and chair of judges, said the Elizabeth line was "a triumph in architect-led collaboration" that transformed "the typical commuter chaos . . . into an effortless experience".

== See also ==
- Crossrail 2 – second proposed Crossrail route providing a new north–south rail link across Greater London
- Thameslink - north–south route through London connecting locations across south east England
- The Fifteen Billion Pound Railway, a documentary about the Elizabeth line's construction and commissioning
- Transport in London
- Réseau Express Régional
- Naniwasuji Line, planned north–south rail link in Osaka
