= List of schools in Essex =

The pink districts are within the Local Education Authority for Essex.: 1. Uttlesford; 2. Braintree; 3. Colchester; 4. Tendring; 5. Harlow; 6. Epping Forest; 7. Chelmsford; 8. Maldon; 9. Brentwood; 10. Basildon; 11. Rochford; 12. Castle Point

This is a list of schools in Essex, England. Essex is the second largest Local Education Authority in England.

== State-funded schools ==
=== Primary schools ===
- Abacus Primary School, Wickford
- Abbotsweld Primary Academy, Harlow
- Acorn Academy, Witham
- The Alderton Infant School, Loughton
- The Alderton Junior School, Loughton
- All Saints' CE Primary School, Dovercourt
- All Saints' CE Primary School, Great Oakley
- All Saints' Maldon CE Primary School, Maldon
- Alresford Primary School, Alresford
- Alton Park Junior School, Clacton-on-Sea
- Ashdon Primary School, Ashdon
- Ashingdon Primary Academy, Ashingdon
- Baddow Hall Infant School, Great Baddow
- Baddow Hall Junior School, Great Baddow
- Bardfield Academy, Vange
- Barling Magna Primary Academy, Barling Magna
- Barnes Farm Primary School, Chelmsford
- Baynards Primary School, Tiptree
- The Beaulieu Park School, Chelmsford
- Beckers Green Primary School, Braintree
- Beehive Lane Community Primary School, Great Baddow
- Belchamp St Paul CE Primary School, Belchamp St Paul
- Bentfield Primary School, Stansted Mountfitchet
- Bentley St Paul's CE Primary School, Bentley
- Birch CE Primary School, Birch
- Birchanger CE Primary School, Birchanger
- The Bishop William Ward CE Primary School, Great Horkesley
- The Bishops' CE and RC Primary School, Chelmsford
- Blackmore Primary School, Blackmore
- Bocking Primary School, Bocking
- Boreham Primary School, Boreham
- Boxted St Peter's CE School, Boxted
- Bradfield Primary School, Bradfield
- Braiswick Primary School, Braiswick
- Brightlingsea Primary School, Brightlingsea
- Brightside Primary School, Billericay
- Brinkley Grove Primary School, Colchester
- Briscoe Primary School, Pitsea
- Broomfield Primary School, Broomfield
- Broomgrove Infant School, Wivenhoe
- Broomgrove Junior School, Wivenhoe
- Buckhurst Hill Community Primary School, Buckhurst Hill
- Burnham-on-Crouch Primary School, Burnham-on-Crouch
- Burrsville Infant Academy, Clacton-on-Sea
- Buttsbury Primary School, Billericay
- Camulos Academy, Colchester
- Canewdon Endowed CE Primary School, Canewdon
- Cann Hall Primary School, Clacton-on-Sea
- Canvey Island Infant School, Canvey Island
- Canvey Junior School, Canvey Island
- The Cathedral CE Primary School, Chelmsford
- Chancellor Park Primary School, Chelmsford
- Chappel CE Primary School, Chappel
- Chase Lane Primary School, Dovercourt
- Cherry Tree Academy, Colchester
- Cherry Tree Primary School, Basildon
- Chigwell Primary Academy, Chigwell
- Chigwell Row Infant School, Chigwell
- Chipping Hill Primary School, Witham
- Chipping Ongar Primary School, Chipping Ongar
- Chrishall Holy Trinity and St Nicholas CE Primary School, Chrishall
- Christ Church CE Primary School, Latchingdon
- Church Langley Community Primary School, Harlow
- Churchgate CE Primary School, Harlow
- Clavering Primary School, Clavering
- Cold Norton Primary School, Cold Norton
- Collingwood Primary School, South Woodham Ferrers
- Colne Engaine CE Primary School, Colne Engaine
- Cooks Spinney Primary Academy, Harlow
- Coopersale and Theydon Garnon CE Primary School, Coopersale
- Copford CE Primary School, Copford
- Crays Hill Primary School, Crays Hill
- Cressing Primary School, Tye Green
- Danbury Park Community Primary School, Danbury
- de Vere Primary School, Castle Hedingham
- Debden CE Primary Academy, Debden
- Dedham CE Primary School, Dedham
- Doddinghurst CE Junior School, Doddinghurst
- Doddinghurst Infant School, Doddinghurst
- Down Hall Primary School, Rayleigh
- Downham CE Primary School, Ramsden Heath
- The Downs Primary School, Harlow
- Dr Walker's CE Primary School, Fyfield
- Dunmow St Mary's Primary School, Great Dunmow
- Earls Colne Primary School, Earls Colne
- East Hanningfield CE Primary School, East Hanningfield
- Edward Francis Primary School, Rayleigh
- Elm Hall Primary School, Witham
- Elmstead Primary School, Elmstead Market
- Elmwood Primary School, South Woodham Ferrers
- Elsenham CE Primary School, Elsenham
- Engaines Primary School, Little Clacton
- Epping Primary School, Epping
- Epping Upland CE Primary School, Epping Green
- Eversley Primary School, Pitsea
- Fairhouse Community Primary School, Basildon
- Farnham CE Primary School, Farnham
- Fawbert and Barnard's Primary School, Old Harlow
- Feering CE Primary School, Feering
- Felmore Primary School, Pitsea
- Felsted Primary School, Felsted
- Finchingfield St John the Baptist CE Primary Academy, Finchingfield
- Fingringhoe CE Primary School, Fingringhoe
- The Flitch Green Academy, Little Dunmow
- Ford End CE Primary School, Ford End
- Fordham All Saints CE Primary School, Fordham
- Freshwaters Primary Academy, Harlow
- Friars Grove Primary School, Colchester
- Frinton-on-Sea Primary School, Frinton-on-Sea
- Galleywood Infant School, Galleywood
- Ghyllgrove Primary School, Basildon
- Glebe Primary School, Rayleigh
- Gosbecks Primary School, Colchester
- Gosfield Community Primary School, Gosfield
- Grange Primary School, Wickford
- Great Bardfield Primary School, Great Bardfield
- Great Bentley Primary School, Great Bentley
- Great Berry Primary School, Langdon Hills
- Great Bradfords Infant School, Braintree
- Great Bradfords Junior School, Braintree
- Great Chesterford CE Primary Academy, Great Chesterford
- Great Clacton CE Junior School, Great Clacton
- Great Dunmow Primary School, Great Dunmow
- Great Easton CE Primary School, Great Easton
- Great Leighs Primary School, Great Leighs
- Great Sampford Community Primary School, Great Sampford
- Great Tey CE Primary School, Great Tey
- Great Totham Primary School, Great Totham
- Great Wakering Primary Academy, Great Wakering
- Great Waltham CE Primary School, Great Waltham
- Greensted Primary School, Basildon
- Grove Wood Primary School, Rayleigh
- Hadleigh Infant School, Hadleigh
- Hadleigh Junior School, Hadleigh
- Hamford Primary Academy, Walton-on-the-Naze
- Hamilton Primary School, Colchester
- Hare Street Community Primary School, Harlow
- Harlowbury Primary School, Old Harlow
- Harwich Community Primary School, Harwich
- Hatfield Heath Primary School, Hatfield Heath
- Hatfield Peverel Infant School, Hatfield Peverel
- Hatfield Peverel St Andrew's Junior School, Hatfield Peverel
- Hazelmere Infant School, Colchester
- Hazelmere Junior School, Colchester
- Heathlands CE Primary School, West Bergholt
- Helena Romanes School, Great Dunmow
- Henham and Ugley Primary School, Henham
- Henry Moore Primary School, Church Langley
- Hereward Primary School, Loughton
- Heybridge Primary School, Heybridge
- High Beech CE Primary School, High Beach
- High Ongar Primary School, High Ongar
- Highfields Primary School, Lawford
- Highwood Primary School, Highwood
- Highwoods Community Primary School, Colchester
- Hillhouse CE Primary School, Waltham Abbey
- Hilltop Infant School, Wickford
- Hilltop Junior School, Wickford
- Hockley Primary School, Hockley
- Hogarth Primary School, Brentwood
- Holland Haven Primary School, Holland-on-Sea
- Holland Park Primary School, Clacton-on-Sea
- Holly Trees Primary School, Warley
- Holt Farm Infant School, Rochford
- Holt Farm Junior School, Rochford
- Holy Cross RC Primary School, Harlow
- Holy Family RC Primary School, South Benfleet
- Holy Family RC Primary School, Witham
- Holy Trinity CE Primary School, Fordham Heath
- Holy Trinity CE Primary School, Halstead
- Home Farm Primary School, Colchester
- Howbridge CE Junior School, Witham
- Howbridge Infant School, Witham
- Hutton All Saints' CE Primary School, Brentwood
- Iceni Academy, Colchester
- Ingatestone and Fryerning CE Junior School, Ingatestone
- Ingatestone Infant School, Ingatestone
- Ingrave Johnstone CE Primary School, Ingrave
- Ivy Chimneys Primary School, Epping
- Janet Duke Primary School, Laindon
- Jerounds Primary Academy, Harlow
- John Bunyan Primary School, Braintree
- John Ray Infant School, Braintree
- John Ray Junior School, Braintree
- Jotmans Hall Primary School, Benfleet
- Katherine Semar Infant School, Saffron Walden
- Katherine Semar Junior School, Saffron Walden
- Katherines Primary Academy, Harlow
- Kelvedon Hatch Community Primary School, Kelvedon Hatch
- Kelvedon St Mary's CE Primary Academy, Kelvedon
- Kendall CE Primary School, Colchester
- Kents Hill Infant Academy, Benfleet
- Kents Hill Junior School, Benfleet
- King's Ford Academy, Colchester
- King's Ford Infant School, Colchester
- Kings Road Primary School, Chelmsford
- Kingsmoor Academy, Harlow
- Kingston Primary School, Thundersley
- Kingswood Primary School, Basildon
- Kirby Primary Academy, Kirby Cross
- Laindon Park Primary School, Laindon
- Lakelands Primary School, Colchester
- Lambourne Primary School, Abridge
- Langenhoe Community Primary School, Abberton
- Langham Primary School, Langham
- Larchwood Primary School, Brentwood
- Larkrise Primary School, Great Baddow
- Latton Green Primary Academy, Harlow
- Lawford CE Primary School, Lawford
- Lawford Mead Primary, Chelmsford
- Layer-de-la-Haye CE Primary School, Layer de la Haye
- Lee Chapel Primary School, Basildon
- Leigh Beck Infant School, Canvey Island
- Leigh Beck Junior School, Canvey Island
- Leverton Primary School, Waltham Abbey
- Lexden Primary School, Colchester
- Limes Farm Infant School, Chigwell
- Limes Farm Junior School, Chigwell
- Lincewood Primary School, Langdon Hills
- Little Hallingbury CE Primary School, Little Hallingbury
- Little Parndon Primary Academy, Harlow
- Little Waltham CE Primary School, Little Waltham
- Long Ridings Primary School, Hutton
- Longwood Primary Academy, Harlow
- Lubbins Park Primary Academy, Canvey Island
- Lyons Hall School, Braintree
- Magna Carta Primary Academy, Stansted Mountfitchet
- Maldon Primary School, Maldon
- Maltese Road Primary School, Chelmsford
- Manuden Primary School, Manuden
- Maple Grove Primary School, Pitsea
- Margaretting CE Primary School, Margaretting
- Matching Green CE Primary School, Matching Green
- The Mayflower Primary School, Dovercourt
- Maylandsea Primary School, Maylandsea
- Meadgate Primary School, Great Baddow
- Merrylands Primary School, Laindon
- Mersea Island School, West Mersea
- Messing Primary School, Messing
- Mildmay Primary School, Chelmsford
- Milldene Primary School, Tiptree
- Millfields Primary School, Wivenhoe
- Millhouse Primary School, Laindon
- Milwards Primary School, Harlow
- Monkwick Infant School, Colchester
- Monkwick Junior School, Colchester
- Montgomerie Primary School, Thundersley
- Montgomery Primary School, Colchester
- Moreton CE Primary School, Moreton
- Moulsham Infant School, Chelmsford
- Moulsham Junior School, Chelmsford
- Mountnessing CE Primary School, Mountnessing
- Myland Community Primary School, Myland
- Nazeing Primary School, Nazeing
- Newhall Primary Academy, Harlow
- Newlands Spring Primary School, Chelmsford
- Newport Primary School, Newport
- Noak Bridge Primary School, Basildon
- North Crescent Primary School, Wickford
- North Primary School, Colchester
- Northlands Primary School, Pitsea
- Northwick Park Primary Academy, Canvey Island
- Notley Green Primary School, Great Notley
- Oakfield Primary School, Wickford
- Oaklands Infant School, Chelmsford
- Oakwood Infant School, Clacton-on-Sea
- Old Heath Community Primary School, Colchester
- Ongar Primary School, Shelley
- Our Lady Immaculate RC Primary School, Chelmsford
- Our Lady of Ransom RC Primary School, Rayleigh
- Parkwood Academy, Chelmsford
- Parsons Heath CE Primary School, Colchester
- Pear Tree Mead Academy, Harlow
- Pemberley Academy, Harlow
- Perryfields Infant School, Chelmsford
- Perryfields Junior School, Chelmsford
- The Phoenix Primary School, Laindon
- Plumberow Primary Academy, Hockley
- Potter Street Academy, Harlow
- Prettygate Infant School, Colchester
- Prettygate Junior School, Colchester
- Priory Primary School, Bicknacre
- Purford Green Primary School, Harlow
- Purleigh Community Primary School, Purleigh
- Queen Boudica Primary School, Colchester
- Quilters Infant School, Billericay
- Quilters Junior School, Billericay
- R A Butler Infant School, Saffron Walden
- R A Butler Junior School, Saffron Walden
- Radwinter CE Primary School, Radwinter
- Ravens Academy, Clacton-on-Sea
- Rayleigh Primary School, Rayleigh
- Rayne Primary School, Rayne
- Rettendon Primary School, Rettendon
- Richard De Clare Community Academy, Halstead
- Rickling CE Primary School, Rickling
- Ridgewell CE Primary School, Ridgewell
- Rivenhall CE Primary School, Rivenhall
- Riverside Primary School, Hullbridge
- Roach Vale Primary School, Colchester
- The Robert Drake Primary School, Thundersley
- Rochford Primary School, Rochford
- Rodings Primary School, Leaden Roding
- Rolph CE Primary School, Thorpe-le-Soken
- Roseacres Primary School, Takeley
- Roxwell CE Primary School, Roxwell
- Roydon Primary School, Roydon
- Runwell Community Primary School, Runwell
- Ryedene Primary School, Basildon
- St Alban's RC Academy, Harlow
- St Andrew's Bulmer CE Primary School, Bulmer
- St Andrew's CE Primary School, Great Yeldham
- St Andrew's CE Primary School, Halstead
- St Andrew's CE Primary School, Marks Tey
- St Andrew's CE Primary School, North Weald Bassett
- St Anne Line RC Infant School, Basildon
- St Anne Line RC Junior School, Basildon
- St Cedd's CE Primary School, Bradwell-on-Sea
- St Clare's RC Primary School, Clacton-on-Sea
- St Francis RC Primary School, Braintree
- St Francis RC Primary School, Maldon
- St George's CE Primary School, Great Bromley
- St George's School, Colchester
- St Giles' CE Primary School, Great Maplestead
- St Helen's RC Infant School, Brentwood
- St Helen's RC Junior School, Brentwood
- St James CE Primary School, Harlow
- St James' CE Primary School, Colchester
- St John CE Primary School, Danbury
- St John Fisher RC Primary School, Loughton
- St John the Baptist CE Primary School, Pebmarsh
- St John's CE Primary School, Buckhurst Hill
- St John's CE Primary School, Colchester
- St John's Green Primary School, Colchester
- St Joseph the Worker RC Primary School, Hutton
- St Joseph's RC Primary School, Canvey Island
- St Joseph's RC Primary School, Harwich
- St Joseph's RC Primary School, South Woodham Ferrers
- St Katherine's CE Primary School, Canvey Island
- St Lawrence CE Primary School, Rowhedge
- St Leonard's CE Primary School, Southminster
- St Luke's CE Primary School, Tiptree
- St Luke's Park Primary School, Runwell
- St Luke's RC Academy, Harlow
- St Margaret's CE Academy, Bowers Gifford
- St Margaret's CE Primary School Toppesfield
- St Mary's CE Primary School, Ardleigh
- St Mary's CE Primary School, Burnham-on-Crouch
- St Mary's CE Primary School, Hatfield Broad Oak
- St Mary's CE Primary School, Saffon Walden
- St Mary's CE Primary School, Stansted Mountfitchet
- St Mary's CE Primary School, Woodham Ferrers
- St Michael's CE Junior School, Galleywood
- St Michael's CE Primary School, Braintree
- St Michael's CE Primary School, Ramsey
- St Michael's Primary School, Colchester
- St Nicholas CE Primary School, Tillingham
- St Nicholas' CE Primary School, Rawreth
- St Osyth CE Primary School, St Osyth
- St Peter's CE Primary School, Coggeshall
- St Peter's CE Primary School, Sible Hedingham
- St Peter's CE Primary School, South Weald
- St Peter's CE Primary School, West Hanningfield
- St Peter's RC Primary School, Billericay
- St Pius X RC Primary School, Chelmsford
- St Teresa's RC Primary School, Basildon
- St Teresa's RC Primary School, Colchester
- St Teresa's RC Primary School, Rochford
- St Thomas More RC Primary School, Saffron Walden
- St Thomas More's RC Primary School, Colchester
- St Thomas of Canterbury CE Primary School, Brentwood
- Shalford Primary School, Shalford
- Sheering CE Primary School, Sheering
- Shenfield St Mary's CE Primary School, Shenfield
- Silver End Academy, Silver End
- Sir Martin Frobisher Academy, Jaywick
- South Benfleet Primary School, South Benfleet
- South Green Infant School, Billericay
- South Green Junior School, Billericay
- Spring Meadow Primary School, Dovercourt
- Springfield Primary School, Springfield
- Stambridge Primary School, Stambridge
- Stanway Fiveways Primary School, Stanway
- Stanway Primary School, Stanway
- Stapleford Abbotts Primary School, Stapleford Abbotts
- Staples Road Primary School, Loughton
- Stebbing Primary School, Stebbing
- Steeple Bumpstead Primary School, Steeple Bumpstead
- Stisted CE Primary Academy, Stisted
- Stock CE Primary School, Stock
- Stourview CE Primary School, Mistley
- Sunnymede Primary School, Billericay
- Takeley Primary School, Little Canfield
- Tany's Dell Primary School, Harlow
- Templars Academy, Witham
- Tendring Primary School, Tendring
- Terling CE Primary School, Terling
- Thaxted Primary School, Thaxted
- Theydon Bois Primary School, Theydon Bois
- Thomas Willingale Primary School, Loughton
- Thundersley Primary School, Thundersley
- Tiptree Heath Primary School, Tiptree
- Tollesbury School, Tollesbury
- Tolleshunt D'Arcy St Nicholas Primary Academy, Tolleshunt D'Arcy
- Trinity Road Primary School, Chelmsford
- Trinity St Mary's CE Primary School, South Woodham Ferrers
- The Tyrrells School, Springfield
- Unity Primary Academy, Colchester
- Upshire Primary Foundation School, Upshire
- Vange Primary School, Basildon
- Waltham Holy Cross Primary Academy, Waltham Abbey
- Walton on the Naze Primary School, Walton-on-the-Naze
- Warley Primary School, Brentwood
- Water Lane Primary Academy, Harlow
- Waterman Primary Academy, Rochford
- Weeley St Andrew's CE Primary School, Weeley
- Wentworth Primary School, Maldon
- West Horndon Primary School, West Horndon
- Westerings Primary Academy, Hawkwell
- Westlands Community Primary School, Chelmsford
- Westwood Academy, Hadleigh
- Wethersfield CE Primary School, Wethersfield
- White Bridge Primary School, Loughton
- White Court School, Great Notley
- White Hall Academy, Clacton-on-Sea
- White Notley CE Primary School, White Notley
- Whitmore Primary School, Basildon
- The Wickford CE School, Wickford
- Wickford Primary School, Wickford
- William Martin CE Infant School, Harlow
- William Martin CE Junior School, Harlow
- William Read Primary School, Canvey Island
- Willow Brook Primary School, Colchester
- Willowbrook Primary School, Brentwood
- The Willows Primary School, Basildon
- Wimbish Primary Academy, Wimbish
- Winter Gardens Academy, Canvey Island
- Witham Oaks Academy, Witham
- Wix and Wrabness Primary School, Wix
- Woodham Ley Primary School, South Benfleet
- Woodham Walter CE Primary School, Woodham Walter
- Woodville Primary School, South Woodham Ferrers
- Writtle Infant School, Writtle
- Writtle Junior School, Writtle
- Wyburns Primary School, Rayleigh

=== Non-selective secondary schools ===
- Alec Hunter Academy, Braintree
- Anglo European School, Ingatestone
- Appleton School, South Benfleet
- Basildon Academies, Basildon
- Beauchamps High School, Wickford
- The Beaulieu Park School, Chelmsford
- Becket Keys Church of England School, Brentwood
- The Billericay School, Billericay
- BMAT STEM Academy, Harlow
- The Boswells School, Chelmsford
- Brentwood County High School, Brentwood
- Brentwood Ursuline Convent High School, Brentwood
- The Bromfords School, Wickford
- Burnt Mill Academy, Harlow
- Castle View School, Canvey Island
- Chelmer Valley High School, Chelmsford
- Clacton Coastal Academy, Clacton-on-Sea
- Clacton County High School, Clacton-on-Sea
- Colchester Academy, Colchester
- The Colne Community School and College, Brightlingsea
- Cornelius Vermuyden School, Canvey Island
- Davenant Foundation School, Loughton
- De La Salle School, Basildon
- The Deanes, Thundersley
- Debden Park High School, Debden
- Epping St John's School, Epping
- FitzWimarc School, Rayleigh
- Forest Hall School, Stansted Mountfitchet
- The Gilberd School, Colchester
- Great Baddow High School, Chelmsford
- Greensward Academy, Hockley
- Harwich and Dovercourt High School, Harwich
- Hedingham School, Sible Hedingham
- Helena Romanes School, Great Dunmow
- Honywood Community Science School, Coggeshall
- Hylands School, Writtle
- James Hornsby School, Laindon
- Joyce Frankland Academy, Newport
- King Edmund School, Rochford
- King Harold Business and Enterprise Academy, Waltham Abbey
- The King John School, Thundersley
- Maltings Academy, Witham
- Manningtree High School, Lawford
- Mark Hall Academy, Harlow
- Mayflower High School, Billericay
- Moulsham High School, Chelmsford
- New Rickstones Academy, Witham
- Notley High School, Braintree
- The Ongar Academy, Shelley
- Ormiston Rivers Academy, Burnham-on-Crouch
- Passmores Academy, Harlow
- Paxman Academy, Colchester
- Philip Morant School and College, Colchester
- Plume School, Maldon
- The Ramsey Academy, Halstead
- Roding Valley High School, Loughton
- Saffron Walden County High School, Saffron Walden
- St Benedict's Catholic College, Colchester
- St Helena School, Colchester
- St John Payne Catholic School, Chelmsford
- St Mark's West Essex Catholic School, Harlow
- St Martin's School, Brentwood
- The Sandon School, Sandon
- Shenfield High School, Shenfield
- Sir Frederick Gibberd College, Harlow
- The Stanway School, Stanway
- Stewards Academy, Harlow
- The Sweyne Park School, Rayleigh
- Tabor Academy, Braintree
- Tendring Technology College, Frinton-on-Sea
- Thomas Lord Audley School, Colchester
- Thurstable School, Tiptree
- The Trinity School, Colchester
- West Hatch High School, Chigwell
- William de Ferrers School, South Woodham Ferrers
- Woodlands School, Basildon

=== Grammar schools ===
- Chelmsford County High School for Girls, Chelmsford
- Colchester County High School for Girls, Colchester
- Colchester Royal Grammar School, Colchester
- King Edward VI Grammar School, Chelmsford

=== Special and alternative schools ===
- Beckmead Moundwood Academy, Harlow
- Castledon School, Wickford
- Cedar Hall School, Thundersley
- Chatten Free School, Rivenhall
- Children's Support Service Langdon Hills, Langdon Hills
- Columbus School and College, Chelmsford
- The Edith Borthwick School, Braintree
- The Endeavour Co-Operative Academy, Braintree
- Glenwood School, Thundersley
- The Greenwell Academy, Harlow
- Grove House School, Brentwood
- Harlow Fields School and College, Harlow
- The Hawthorns School, Chelmsford
- Heybridge Co-Operative Academy, Heybridge
- Kingswode Hoe School, Colchester
- Langham Oaks, Langham
- Lexden Springs School, Colchester
- Market Field School, Elmstead Market
- North East Essex Co-operative Academy, Myland
- Oak View School, Loughton
- The Pioneer School, Basildon
- Poplar Adolescent Unit, Rochford
- Ramsden Hall Academy, Ramsden Heath
- The St Aubyn Centre Education Department, Colchester
- Shorefields School, Clacton-on-Sea
- Southview School, Witham
- Thriftwood School, Galleywood
- Wells Park School, Chigwell

=== Sixth forms ===
- Mayflower High School Billeracy
- St Martin School`s Brentwood
- Shenfield High School Shenfield
- Brentwood School Brentwood
- Chigwell School Chigwell

=== Further education ===
- Braintree College
- Braintree Sixth Form
- Chelmsford College
- Colchester Institute
- Debden House
- Epping Forest College
- Harlow College
- Sixth Form College Colchester
- South Essex College
- USP College

== Independent schools ==
=== Primary and preparatory schools ===
- Coopersale Hall School, Coopersale
- The Daiglen School, Buckhurst Hill
- Elm Green Preparatory School, Little Baddow
- Heathcote School, Danbury
- Holmwood House School, Colchester
- Howe Green House School, Howe Green
- Littlegarth School, Nayland
- Loyola Preparatory School, Buckhurst Hill
- Maldon Court Preparatory School, Maldon
- Oaklands School, Loughton
- Oxford House School, Colchester
- St Anne's School, Chelmsford
- St Cedd's School, Chelmsford
- St Margaret's Preparatory School, Gosfield
- St Philomena's School, Frinton-on-Sea
- Ursuline Preparatory School, Brentwood
- Widford Lodge Preparatory School, Chelmsford
- Woodlands School, Great Warley
- Woodlands School, Brentwood

=== Senior and all-through schools ===
- Braeside School, Buckhurst Hill
- Brentwood School, Brentwood
- Chigwell School, Chigwell
- The Christian School, Takeley
- Colchester High School, Colchester
- Felsted School, Felsted
- Gosfield School, Gosfield
- New Hall School, Boreham
- St John's School, Billericay
- St Mary's School, Colchester
- St Nicholas School, Harlow

=== Special and alternative schools ===
- The Belsteads School, Little Waltham
- Cambian Great Dunmow School, Great Dunmow
- Chelmsford Hospital School, Chelmsford
- Clarity Independent School, Sandon
- Compass Community School Essex, Little Clacton
- Doucecroft School, Eight Ash Green
- The Karalius Foundation, Rayleigh
- Luxborough Court School, Chigwell
- Minerva Independent School, Clacton-on-Sea
- Octavia House Schools, Great Baddow
- Open Box Education Centre, Epping
- St John's RC School, Chigwell
- Teaseldown School, Sible Hedingham
- The Tower School, Epping
- Woodcroft School, Loughton
- Woodend Farm School, Witham
- The Yellow House School, Sible Hedingham

=== Further education ===
- Masters Performing Arts College
