= Tendring Technology College =

Lift Tendring

Location
- Rochford Way; Frinton-on-Sea, Essex, CO13 0AZ; England
- Coordinates: 51°50′36″N 1°14′58″E

Information
- Type: Academy
- Motto: Find your Remarkable
- Established: 1871 (Gunfleet College)
- Founder: Lionel Gunfleet
- Trust: Lift Schools
- Specialist: Technology
- Department for Education URN: 137188 Tables
- Ofsted: Reports
- Chair: Jean Cains
- Principal: Tom Burt
- Gender: Coeducational
- Age: 11 to 19
- Enrollment: 1829 (2021)
- Colours: Red and Black
- Website: www.tendringtechnologycollege.org

Lift Tendring is a secondary school, with a sixth form, in Essex, England. It is one of six secondary schools in the Tendring District, with Clacton Coastal Academy, Clacton County High School, The Colne Community School and College, Manningtree High School and Harwich and Dovercourt High School.

== History ==
The academy was previously led by Mike Watson; he left in 2004 after twenty years at the school, and was replaced by Caroline Hayes. Hayes was in post for 12 years, until 2016. Michael Muldoon became principal in 2016. He left in 2021, and Tom Burt took the post.

== Facilities ==
The academy saw building work at its Frinton Campus in 2003 when new departmental buildings were erected. One of these buildings, the Watson building, was named after former principal Michael Watson and is occupied by the performing arts department. After a long battle the academy secured the funding for a £2.8 million state-of-the-art Sixth Form Centre, at the Frinton Campus site, which was completed in September 2011. The new building has a media suite, social area and extra teaching space. This followed previous upgrades to the Frinton Campus, creating teaching space, a resources centre and exterior improvements.

== Ofsted inspections ==
The college was rated 'Inadequate' by Ofsted in 2021. A Termination Warning was issued in 2022. As of 2025, the school's last inspection was in 2024, with an overall judgement of Good.

== Controversies ==
On 25–27 May 2021, teachers and staff of the school went on Strike action due to a planned restructure by the Trust

On 2 January 2023, footage emerged of a student being attacked by a group of boys, and hospitalised.

By 23 July 2024, the school had the highest number of pupils suspended in Essex.

== Notable former pupils ==
- Ellie Challis, swimmer, Tokyo 2020 Paralympic Games silver medallist
- Ben Foakes, England cricketer
- Mike Haywood, Northampton Saints rugby player
- Alex Porter, former Great Britain volleyball team captain
- Samantha Redgrave, 2022 World Rowing Championships gold medallist
