= Sam the Man =

2001 film by Gary Winick

- Directed by: Gary Winick
- Screenplay by: Paul Kneubuhl; Kevin Kennedy
- Story by: Paul Kneubuhl; Fisher Stevens
- Starring: Fisher Stevens; Annabella Sciorra
- Cinematography: Wolfgang Held
- Edited by: Sabine Hoffmann; Lea O'Donnell; Michael Ventresco
- Music by: Joey Altruda
- Production companies: Collective Voice; GreeneStreet Films; InDgEnt
- Release dates: February 2001 (Santa Monica); January 25, 2005 (DVD)
- Running time: 87 minutes
- Country: United States
- Language: English

Sam the Man is a 2001 American film directed by Gary Winick and starring Fisher Stevens.

== Plot ==
A writer having difficulty completing his second novel goes on a journey of self-discovery.

== Cast ==
- Fisher Stevens as Sam Manning
- Annabella Sciorra as Cass
- Alex Porter as Saxophone Player
- John Slattery as Maxwell Slade
- Annika Peterson as Emily
- Ron Rifkin as Richard
- Saverio Guerra as Lorenzo Pugano
- George Plimpton as himself
- Griffin Dunne as man in Bathroom
- Maria Bello as Anastasia Powell
- Danielle Ferland as Ella
- Joshua Dov as College Boy (as Josh Dov)
- Rob Morrow as Daniel Lenz
- Luis Guzmán as Murray (as Luis Guzman)
- Jean-Luke Figueroa as Buster Pugano
