= St John's Roman Catholic School, Essex =

St John's RC School

Location
- Turpins Lane; Chigwell/Woodford Green, Essex, IG8 8AX; England
- Coordinates: 51.6091°N 0.0643°E

Information
- Type: Special school
- Religious affiliation: Roman Catholic
- Department for Education URN: 115466 Tables
- Ofsted: Reports
- Gender: Coeducational
- Age: 5 to 19
- Enrolment: 99
- Website: http://www.stjohnsrcschool.co.uk/

St John's RC School is a Roman Catholic special school located in Essex, England. The school is located south of Chigwell in the Epping Forest District of Essex, but is closer to Woodford Green in the London Borough of Redbridge.

The school educates pupils aged 5 to 19 years old who have moderate to severe learning difficulties, including communication difficulties and autism. According to Ofsted the school has 99 students on roll.

The school is not to be confused with either of the two other secondary schools in Essex also called St Johns:

- St John's School (an independent school), Billericay
- Epping St John's School, Epping
