= Donyland Lodge =

Location
- Fingringhoe Road; Rowhedge; Colchester, Essex, CO5 7JL; England
- Coordinates: 51.86187°N 0.93278°E

Information
- Type: Supported Living Care Home
- Local authority: Essex
- Department for Education URN: 115439 Tables
- Gender: Boys and girls
- Age: 18 to 65
- Website: https://web.archive.org/web/20100516171715/http://www.donyland.org.uk/

Donyland Lodge was an independent school in Rowhedge, Colchester in the United Kingdom The school catered for children with complex behavioural, social and emotional difficulties.

== See also ==
- Secondary schools in Essex
