= Bishops Park College =

Location
- Jaywick Lane; Clacton On Sea, Essex, CO16 8BE; England; 51.79236°N 1.12029°E

Information
- Type: comprehensive
- Established: 2002
- Closed: 2009
- Local authority: Essex
- Head teacher: Nick Pavitt
- Website: Bishopspark

Bishops Park College was a comprehensive school located in Clacton-on-Sea, Essex. It is now officially combined with Colbayns High School. The two have been renamed Clacton Coastal Academy.

== History ==
Bishops Park College opened in 2002. The school was placed on special measures in 2007 but in 2009 the school received a positive Ofsted inspection.

== See also ==
- List of schools in Essex
