= Harris Academy Billericay =

Location
- School Road; Non-denominational; Billericay, Essex, CM12 9LH; England; 51°37′06″N 0°25′11″E

Information
- Type: Academy
- Motto: Caring about success
- Established: 1938 (predecessor institution 1878)
- Specialist: Mathematics and Computing
- Department for Education URN: 136861 Tables
- Ofsted: Reports
- Chair of Governors: Colin Breathwick
- Headteacher: Patrick Berry
- Staff: 125 teaching, 104 non-teaching
- Gender: Mixed (girls:777, boys:918)
- Age: 11 to 18
- Enrolment: 1,713
- Houses: Scott, Keller, Edison, Curie and Newton.
- Colours: Black and Gold
- Website: Official website

Harris Academy Billericay (formerly The Billericay School) is a secondary school located in Billericay, England. The school is led by headmaster Patrick Berry and has an enrolment of 1713. As part of the Billericay Education Consortium the school forms part of a grouping considered to provide the best teacher training in the country according to the Good Teacher Training Guide. According to Ofsted the school is "an over-subscribed Mathematics and Computing specialist school mainly serving the town of Billericay but also drawing students from Basildon and nearby areas". In its most recent Ofsted inspection in 2024, the school was graded as 'good'.

== Head teachers ==
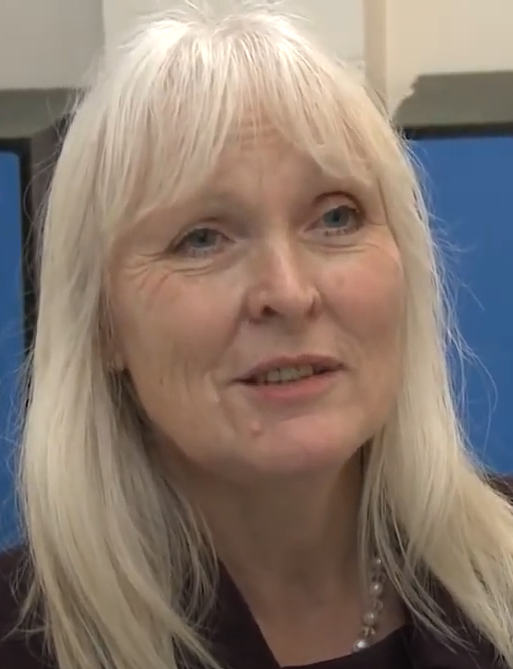
Sue Hammond was the school's first female headteacher and held this position between 1998 and 2015.

Year	Head Teacher
1938–1949	P.G. White
1949–1955	Ronald Eden
1955–1968	John Goldwin
1968–1991	Arthur Lingard
1991–1998	Robert Goodier
1998–2015	Sue Hammond
2015–2021	Ahson Mohammed
2022–2026	Patrick Berry
2026-Present	Russell Tannahill

== History ==
The school was formally opened in 1938 by admiral Sir Vernon Haggard using a ceremonial silver key handed to him by the first headmaster P.G. White. However, a predecessor institution called Great Burstead Board School opened on 13 February 1878. This school was situated just across from Laindon Road and P.G. White who was Billericay School's first headmaster was appointed head of the senior mixed department here in 1923. The Billericay School was built as by the 1930s the school was struggling to cope with a growing enrolment and plans were drawn up for a new school big enough to cater for Billericay’s growing population.

Costing £22,400 Billericay School opened its doors in 1937 a year before its 'official' opening as a grammar school. Air raid shelters were built almost immediately after to protect students from Luftwaffe planes travelling to London on bombing raids during World War II. The school was built upon the site of an Iron Age foundry where prior to the building of the school a cornfield and a farm was located.

P.G. White served as headmaster until 1949 when he died suddenly on holiday shortly before he was due to retire. Arthur Lingard became headmaster in 1949 and oversaw the school's transformation into a comprehensive on 1 September 1968 and the building of the school’s sixth form centre which occurred in the 1960s. During the 1970s exchanges began with international schools including an annual trip to the Einstein Gymnasium in Reutlingen in Germany - an exchange programme that continues to this day. The Parents’ Guild (later Friends of Billericay School) was also formed in this decade. Robert Goodier became headmaster in 1991 and oversaw the move away from LEA governance to self-governance.

The school's Music Studio was finished in 1991 and the decade saw a period of success for the Music Department under the headship of Mr John Stevenson including appearances at the London TV Arts Festival and on the BBC's Blue Peter. In 1997 the school was awarded its third Schools Curriculum Award by Princess Anne. Sue Hammond became the first female head of the school in Easter 1998 and in 1999 the Resource Based Learning Centre (RBLC) was opened. In March 2002 the school was the subject of a channel 5 documentary concerning a school reunion for pupils who attended the school between 1980 and 1982.

A-block can be seen in the background of the front cover of Sylvia Kent's book on The Billericay School.

The School achieved Maths and Computing College status in 2003 allowing some use of selection based on aptitude in these subjects. It was thought that this status would generate an additional £1 million worth of funding, but a government policy on foundation schools reduced this sum significantly. The school has since converted to academy status, but continues to have Maths and Computing as a specialism.

The 2000s saw long-running attempts to sell disused land adjacent to the school in order to fund a series of improvements Development was initially refused but was appealed. In 2009 approval was gained to develop 51 new homes upon a six-acre plot.

Changes were made in the 2005/06 academic year which cut the lunch break from 1 hour to 45 mins so that the school day finished at 3.00pm rather than 3.15pm. In January 2007 the school was at scene of a BBC London news report after a gas explosion scare in nearby South Green, down Southend Road. The school was used to house those evacuated from the surrounding area. No explosion from the acetylene and oxygen cylinders occurred but one man suffered burns from the fire. The scare scene was 3 houses away from the South Green Memorial Hall.

In 2009 it was proposed that the a Billericay Community Trust be formed in order to increase standards at the school. This would involve a partnership with the multinational technology corporation Dell, something that the Essex branch of the National Union of Teachers has objected to. In 2010 The School suffered from austerity measure budget cuts and was one of several schools in Essex which lost out on money promised under the Building Schools for the Future programme.

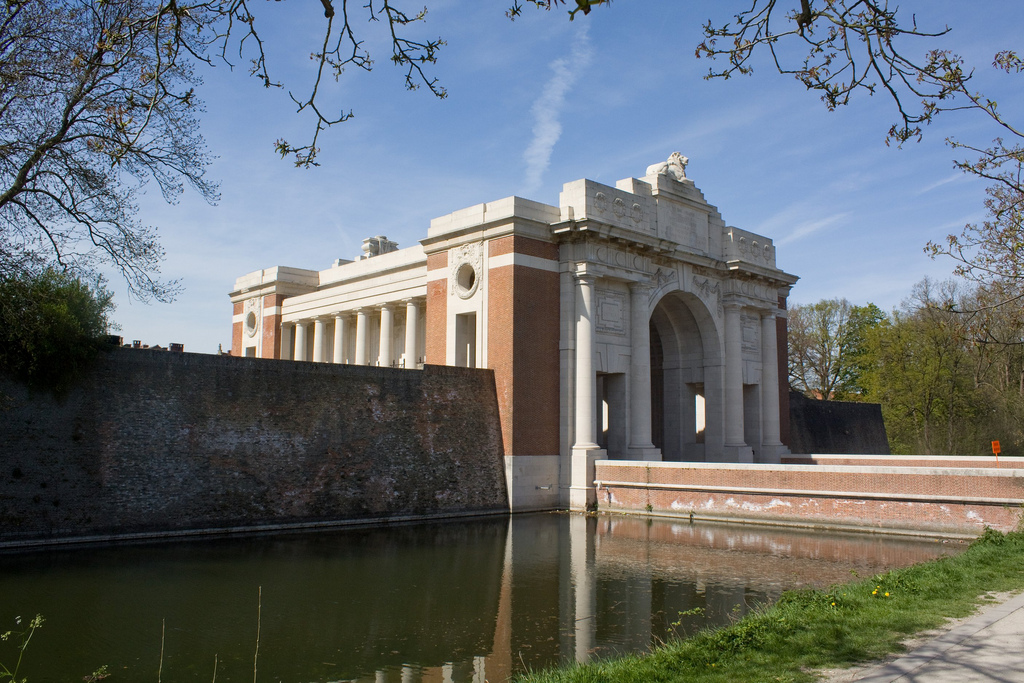
The school stage an annual trip for GCSE History students to the see World War I battlefields in Belgium taking in sites including the Menin Gate (pictured).

In 2011 the school's sixth-form prom ended after some students were allegedly found taking drugs.

The school converted to academy status on 1 July 2011. Becoming an academy school gives the school greater budgetary autonomy and control over its curriculum. This also involved the forming of the Compass Education Trust with a few local schools joining over the years like Bromford in 2017, & Woodlands and Appleton in 2023.

In 2014 the school announced a partnership to aid The Deanes School in Benfleet which has been threatened with closure due to falling student numbers.

In March 2015, Sue Hammond announced that she would retire in the summer following 17 years as head.

The school was subject to a RAAC survey by the DfE in mid 2023. However the presents of RAAC was found in two of the blocks. Billericay is 1 of 62 schools to have this concrete as Essex as a whole was hit the hardest because of RAAC. This meant the full closure of a whole block and several classrooms around the school also needing to be closed. Demountable were placed in the tennis courts of the school temporarily. - this was done by the contractor Maxi Space. During this, in the May half-term of 2024 the school suffered a Cyber attack and sensitive data was exposed to hackers with the school working with the Essex Police and Action Fraud - because of this the school closed for an extra day. But more RAAC was found within class rooms and a further 9 were closed - at the same time as the Cyber attack. The RAAC Migration was done by the end of 2024 and the Cyber Systems were fixed around a week or two later.

The school appeared on Blue Peter in Early 2024 as a student and her friends are surprised to meet the English Woman's Natural Rugby Team with the episode airing on the 28th Feb 2024.

In February 2026 the school joined the Harris Federation with the whole of the Compass Trust joining along as well. This means that Billericay will change its name to Harris Academy: Billericay with the other schools changing there name too to reflect the local area they serve.

== Campus ==
As of May 2013 the school has A, B, C, D, E and F blocks. A B Block used to exist on the greenery, next to the car park, where the footpath now leads from the main gate to 'F' Block. B block was a two-storey wooden structure housing metal and woodworking classrooms on the ground floor and art, pottery, home economics and technical drawing classrooms, on the first floor. It was demolished on the last day of term 1989.

A Block contains mostly Maths classes and R.E classes along with humanities, Computer Science, Child development & geography. This was the original building from when the school was first opened.

C block is the biggest block at the school. It contains mainly Science classrooms. The main wing of the block is a 3 stories high with roughly 1 and a half of these rooms as Science labs. This block also contains the RBLC, more commonly known as the library, which houses over 30,000 books. It also contains (on the top floor) Media and English rooms and on the ground floor there are Drama Studios, Music rooms, Student Services and the important sick bay. Several rooms within the block were found to have RAAC within them meaning during the Migration works the middle part of C block was closed for these works to happen

D Block is the new languages block which was completed in the spring of 2013, constructed from the demountable previously used in V block. The previous D block stood on the same site, constructed from a set of demountable demolished prior to construction of the new block.

E Block is a building built because of the raising of the school-leaving age. (Rosla) building built to house the additional students capacity needed . This block contains the Art classrooms and the Food Technology and Textiles rooms & the art rooms on the ground floor. This block was hit the hardest in 2023 as RAAC was found within the structure meaning the whole block had to close for the RAAC migration to take place.

F block opened for the first time in September 1988. The original F Block contained the, then CDT Department (downstairs) and the Business Studies Department (upstairs). Later, there was a major rebuild to the front of F Block, enlarging it to take the ever-expanding school administrations. At the same time the Head Teacher's office was moved from C block (now the Withdrawal unit) to a new room in the new F Block. As ICT (IT then) expanded, the Business Studies rooms, F7 and F10 became computer rooms. Recently F12 has been converted to house a number of PCs as has F1 with the addition of 30 PCs to augment the DT graphics lessons.

In 2004, a V block was created. It is thought that this refers to the concept of the block being a 'village' community. The V block was built to house the English department, whilst we awaited the new build block. There was a small fire in one of the old D block demountable, but the fire itself did not contribute to the installation of V block. However, 2 of the 5 buildings still remain which were not touched by the fire. V block housed the school's English department. But is now used as a cafeteria.

== Sixth-form ==
Sixth-form students (years 12 and 13) have their own study areas and common room, but shares classrooms with the rest of the school.

== Houses ==
School records show that a house system has been adopted at three periods during the school's history. During the 1930s the house names were Effingham (Red), Raleigh (Blue), Grenville (Green) and Drake (Yellow). From 1961 to 1968 the houses where Stock, Blunt, Norsey and Chantry. In 1969 a house system was introduced with the names of houses referencing historical figures – Fitzwalter, de Vere, Audley and Christopher Martin. However in more recent times the 'Houses' have taken more of a back seat role as the school shifts more to heads of year roles with one teacher being the head of year for the whole duration that a student is in school from Years 7-11. The houses only matter during Sporting events like sports day.

== Visitors ==
The sixth form was visited in May 2006 by the former MP Tony Benn who delivered a speech on politics to sixth form students. Other guests who have visited the school include survivors of the Auschwitz concentration camp Leon Greenman and Josef Perl. Former Prime Minister Margaret Thatcher visited the school in 1980 to present then headmaster Arthur Lingard with a medal recognizing the school's achievements. However, Thatcher had to leave early as the SAS stormed the Iranian Embassy later the same day.

Annually John Baron MP, a Conservative Party politician and MP for Billericay, comes to debate with students on political issues of a local, national and international nature.

== Notable former pupils ==
- Josh Dubovie, a singer who was selected to represent the UK at the Eurovision Song Contest 2010.
- Lee Evans
- David Gandy, British model
- Lauren Platt, an X Factor finalist in series 11 of the show
- Michael Todd the former chief constable of Greater Manchester Police,

=== Billericay Grammar School ===
- Mike Edmonds, actor.
- Irene Wooldridge a participant in the Eurovision Song Contest in 1974 for Luxembourg with Bye Bye I Love You and 1978 for Germany, singing Feuer

== School life and awards ==
Friends Of Billericay School Logo

The school's music department has appeared on Blue Peter. and has received recognition from the British Naturalists’ Association for ecological work at Mill Meadows. The school is active in local public speaking competitions. and has organised a trip to Argentina in order to do community work. A magazine, run and published in the school library under the title of Reviewz Books, reviewed new and classic fiction and has had interviews with authors such as Stephen Fry, Sheila Norton, Iain Banks and Sharon Osbourne. The magazine was edited by Barnaby Walter (founder editor), Rebecca Bedding (deputy editor) and Frankie Burt (co-editor). It was merged in 2008 with the Speak Up website initiative which now features reviews, articles and blog posts from current and past Billericay School students. It can be found at www.billericayschool.net/speakup

FOBS or Friends of Billericay School is a charity which raises money for the school. Most of their income comes from various evening events, usually with singers or comedians, and the '200 Club', a monthly prize draw. The latest funding drive was used to fund the school receiving 'maths and computing college' status, and the organisation has recently raised enough funds to purchase a new school minibus. The schools council is called Backchat. The house captains form a group known as Student Voice. These two groups debate with students and the Head to work towards a better life within the school.

The school awards a number of prizes to exceptional students each year:

- James Dorrington Award - The James Dorrington Award for Sport is an annual award given to a student who has excelled at sport in the past academic year. The award is named after a former student James Dorrington student who died on 1 January 2002 following the diagnosis of a brain tumour.
- Jack Barren Award - The Jack Barren Award is given to a pupil for outstanding contribution to the life of the school. The prize was first awarded in 2000 and is named after a former governor of the school who served for thirty-nine years.
- Jack Bowden Award - The Jack Bowden Award is given to pupils that have been found to be generous, inclusive, compensate, & positive. The award was created in recognition for a former student who died of cancer in 2024.

== See also ==
- Secondary schools in Essex
- Mayflower High School, Billericay
- St John's School, Billericay
