= MMCC =

MMCC may refer to:

- Margaret Morrison Carnegie College
- Mid Michigan Community College
- Multinational Medical Coordination Centre, to coordinate e
- Mountfitchet Maths and Computing College, a former school in Stansted Mountfitchet, now Forest Hall School
- 2200 in Roman numerals
- Ciudad Acuña International Airport in Coahuila State, Northern Mexico
