= Greensward Academy =

Location
- Greensward Lane; London, Essex, SS5 5HG; England; 51°36′24″N 0°39′48″E

Information
- Type: Secondary comprehensive
- Motto: "Find Your Remarkable"
- Trust: Lift Schools
- Specialist: Academy
- Department for Education URN: 135652 Tables
- Ofsted: Reports
- Chair: Robert Turner
- Principal: Katie Scarnell
- Gender: Coeducational
- Age: 11 to 18
- Enrolment: 1465
- Website: greenswardacademy.org

Greensward Academy is a comprehensive school and academy for 11- to 18-year-olds, in Hockley, Essex.

Greensward has 1450 students, including 260 in the sixth form.

The 2011 inspection report states that "The academy has specialisms in science and applied learning and also has Leading Edge and Training School Status".

== History ==
The school opened in 1960 as the Hockley County Secondary School, with pupils from both Hockley, Hullbridge and Ashingdon primary schools who were selected for the first year and a second year of Hockley pupils who previously went to Rayleigh Secondary. It became Greensward School in 1967, and then Greensward College in the late 1990s; the school kept this name until 2008 when it achieved Academy status. Greensward Academy is the lead academy of the Academies Enterprise Trust, a multi-academy sponsor.

== Ofsted judgements ==
- In 2011 the school was judged Outstanding by Ofsted.
- As of 2021, the school's most recent inspection was a short inspection in 2018, with a judgement of Good.

== See also ==
- Secondary schools in Essex
