= Joan Prentice =

English woman executed for witchcraft in 1589

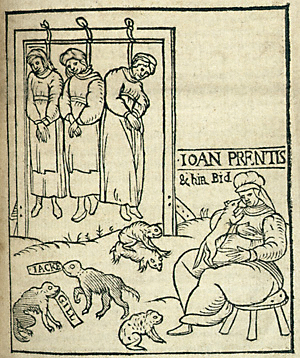
- Died: 5 July 1589; Chelmsford
- Known for: hanged as an accused witch

Joan Prentice or Joan Prentis ( – 5 July 1589) was an Englishwoman executed after being accused of witchcraft with Joan Cunny and Joan Upney in Chelmsford in Essex in 1589.

== Life ==
Prentice lived in an almshouse in Sible Hedingham. She told investigators about her pet who she said was a ferret named "Satan" or "Bid". The ferret she said had asked to be fed and this she had done on a number of occasions. The ferret was said to have fed by biting and sucking her blood from her left cheek.

During her questioning she implicated two other women named Elizabeth Whale and Elizabeth Mott who she said had used her familiar, Bidd. The accusations did not result in any further action against them.

She was charged in line with the 1563 Witchcraft Act which defined the penalties for people found guilty of witchcraft. In time 31 people were found guilty and only one was a man. The 1563 Act in England required that the death penalty could only be used where the accused had caused the death of another. In Prentice's case she said that had asked her familiar to hurt a child but the familiar disobeyed her and the child died. This justified the death penalty.

== Death and legacy ==
Prentice died on 5 July 1589. She was hanged at Chelmsford with Joan Cunny and Joan Upney who were also found guilty of similar crimes. Joan Cunny's daughter, Avis, was also found guilty but she escaped immediate execution because she was pregnant.

Detail of Prentice's life and death are available because the record of her trial is extant and a copy of a publication at the time, "The Apprehension and Confession of Three Notorious Witches Arraigned and by Justice Condemned and Executed at Chelmsford" is also known.
