= J. Redwood Anderson =

English poet and playwright

John Redwood Anderson (1883 – 29 March 1964) was an English poet and playwright. His play Babel was staged on several occasions.

== Life ==
Anderson was born in Salford and educated at home and at Trinity College, Oxford. After travelling, he settled as a teacher in Kingston-upon-Hull.

Anderson's play Babel was staged several times, and published by Ernest Benn in 1927. It reappeared in 1936 in a revised stage version as The Tower to Heaven by the Oxford University Press.

In 1953 his wife, Gwyneth's aunt Rachel Barrett died. She had been a leading suffragette and left her Essex home, Lamb Cottage in Sible Hedingham, to her niece.

Anderson died at his home in Sible Hedingham on 29 March 1964; he was 81.

== Works ==
- The Music of Death (1904)
- The Legend of Eros and Psyche (1908)
- The Mask (1912)
- Flemish Tales (1913)
- Walls and Hedges (1919)
- Haunted Islands (1923/4)
- Babel (1927) verse drama
- The Vortex (1928)
- Standing Waters (1929) (poetry - pamphlet)
- Transvaluations (1932)
- The Human Dawn (1934)
- English Fantasies (1935)
- The Tower to Heaven (1936)
- The Curlew Cries (1940)
- The Principle of Uniformity in English Metre (1941) (criticism - pamphlet)
- Approach (1946)
- The Fugue of Time (1946)
- Paris Symphony (1947)
- An Ascent (1947)
- Pillars to Remembrance (1948)
- Almanac (1956)
- While Fates Allow (1962)
- Poems of the Evening (1971)
