= Beacon High =

Location
- Hilldrop Road; Holloway, London, N7 0JG; England; 51.5531°N 0.1292°W

Information
- Type: Community school
- Motto: Believe, belong, become - where dreams inspire futures
- Established: 1907
- Local authority: Islington
- Department for Education URN: 100453 Tables
- Ofsted: Reports
- Head teacher: Alan Streeter
- Gender: Coeducational
- Age: 11 to 16
- Website: www.beaconhigh.org

Beacon High is a coeducational secondary school for 11-16-year-olds in the Tufnell Park area, located in the London Borough of Islington, England. Beacon High is a member of the Islington Futures Federation of Community Schools and the Islington Sixth Form Partnership. In the school's most recent Ofsted report, it described the school's leadership and management as Good

== History ==
The school was first established in September 1907 by London County Council as a boys' school named Camden Secondary School for Boys.

In 1927, it changed its name to Holloway County Grammar School and then to Holloway Comprehensive School.

== Governance ==
In September 2018, the Governing Body was dissolved and the governance of the school was taken over by the expanded federation of Elizabeth Garrett Anderson and Copenhagen Schools. In June 2019, Holloway School was rebranded as Beacon High.

Islington Futures was a federation of four community schools: EGA, Beacon High School, Copenhagen Primary School and Vittoria Primary School and was established in September 2018. Jo Dibb was the Executive Headteacher of the Islington Futures Federation. The Federation was disbanded in December 2023.

In June 2025, Beacon High launched consultation on proposals to join the Lift Schools group of schools as an academy.

== Present ==
Beacon High offers GCSEs as programmes of study for pupils. Although the school does not operate its own sixth form, graduating pupils are guaranteed a place at City and Islington College through the City and Islington Sixth Form Consortium.

Alan Streeter has been the school's Headteacher since 2018, having previously served as interim Head at the former Holloway School.
