= BMAT STEM Academy =

Location
- Velizy Avenue; Harlow, Essex, CM20 3EZ; 51.7695°N 0.0989°E

Information
- Type: University Technical College
- Established: 1 September 2014
- Department for Education URN: 145931 Tables
- Ofsted: Reports
- Head of School: Mitesh Thaker
- Staff: 25-30
- Gender: Coeducational
- Age: 14 to 19
- Enrollment: 108 As of May 2021
- Capacity: 500As of 2017
- Website: www.bmatstemacademy.org

BMAT STEM Academy is a University Technical College within the Harlow College campus in Harlow, Essex, England, which opened in September 2014 as Sir Charles Kao UTC. It was named after the Nobel Prize winning scientist Charles K. Kao who worked and studied at Standard Telecommunication Laboratories in Harlow. The Academy is currently rated as "Good" in all areas by Ofsted following an inspection in January 2023.

An Ofsted report in April 2017 gave the school a "Requires improvement" grade in all categories; at that time the school had 140 students although its capacity was 500.

From April 2018, the school was re-launched as a member of BMAT, an academy trust which runs schools in Essex including Burnt Mill Academy and Epping St John's. It was renamed to the BMAT STEM Academy.
