= Thurstable School =

Coordinates: 51.8194°N 0.7481°E

Location
- Maypole Road; Tiptree; Colchester, Essex, CO5 0EW; England

Information
- Type: Academy
- Local authority: Essex County Council
- Trust: Thurstable School Sports College and Sixth Form Centre
- Specialist: Sports
- Department for Education URN: 137241 Tables
- Ofsted: Reports
- Head teacher: James Ketley
- Gender: Co-educational
- Age: 11 to 18
- Enrolment: 1190 as of January 2021
- Capacity: 1275
- Colour: Dark Green
- Website: https://www.thurstable.co.uk

Thurstable School is a mixed (ages 11–18) secondary academy school, situated in the village of Tiptree, Essex, England. The school is about 8 miles south of Colchester.

== Controversy ==
In 2018 it was reported that one of the teachers employed there who resigned in April 2017, Paul Kaufman, had acted in an "inappropriate" manner towards female students. Acts included, but not limited to, verbal comments about their appearance, to flirting, to touching their hair, and kicking students. When the school began to receive reports about his behaviour, Kaufman left as the school started to investigate. After the Department for Education banned Kaufman from teaching indefinitely, the former Head Teacher, Miles Bacon, reaffirmed that "the wellbeing of our students is always our highest priority."

== Ofsted inspections ==
As of 2021, the school's most recent inspection by Ofsted was in 2016, with a judgement of Good. Ofsted carried out a monitoring visit in 2020, which was not an inspection and did not result in a judgement. The visit was part of Ofsted's response to the 2020 Coronavirus pandemic. The report notes that pupils in years 7 to 10 have forgotten information they were taught in 2020, and have lost ground in writing, but that students in years 11 to 13 are not thought to have fallen behind.

== See also ==
- Secondary schools in Essex
