= Manningtree High School =

Location
- Colchester Road Lawford; Manningtree, Essex, CO11 2BW; England; 51.94133°N 1.05399°E

Information
- Type: Academy
- Motto: Go With Him Twain
- Local authority: Essex
- Specialist: Science
- Department for Education URN: 137945 Tables
- Ofsted: Reports
- Gender: Coeducational
- Age: 11 to 16
- Song: Go with Him Twain
- Website: www.manningtreehigh.com

Manningtree High School is a secondary school with academy status in Lawford, Manningtree, Essex, England. The school has specialist status in Science. The headteacher is Mr Benjamin Briggs. The school have recently added a "Multi Use Games Area" (all weather pitch) on the field.

== See also ==
- Secondary schools in Essex
