= Clacton Coastal Academy =

Lift Clacton

Location
- Pathfields Road; Clacton-on-Sea, Essex, CO15 3JL; England; 51°47′58″N 1°08′31″E

Information
- Type: Academy
- Trust: Academies Enterprise Trust
- Department for Education URN: 135957 Tables
- Ofsted: Reports
- Chair of Governors: Robert Turner
- Headteacher: Marc Cologne
- Gender: Coeducational
- Age: 11 to 19
- Enrolment: 1299 As of November 2009
- Capacity: 1550
- Website: www.clactoncoastalacademy.org

Lift Clacton is a coeducational high school serving the western part of Clacton-on-Sea. The school has a population of 1500 students with a maximum limit of 1550 students. Formerly known as "Colbayns", the site was officially renamed on 1 September 2009, after merging with the now defunct Bishops Park College. It has been part of Lift Schools since September 2009. After a few years reaching 2024 mid summer a change of name was made to lift clacton

== History ==
The original school dates from 1926 but moved to its present site in 1931 when it was known as the 'Clacton-on-Sea Senior School'. This school gained the unofficial title 'Pathfields School' because access was just off of Pathfields Road. In January 1953, a new building on the west side of Pathfields Road was opened as the 'Clacton County Secondary School for Girls' with Miss Lawrence as Headmistress. The original building on the east site became the 'Clacton County Secondary School for Boys' with Mr K. Portman as Headmaster. In September 1973 the two schools were amalgamated to form Colbayns High School under the headship of D. King. He was succeeded by J. Midgley in 1984.

== Facilities ==
In 1988, John Holt, who joined the staff in 1964, became Headmaster. With the Governing Body, he saw the school through into successful incorporation as a Grant Maintained School within the terms of the Education Reform Act 1988 on 1 September 1993. Under his leadership, in 1996, over £1 million was spent on new facilities.

Nick Pavitt took up his post as headteacher at Easter 1997. During his first year, the school was able to put in hand £420,000 of building work through grants from the Funding Agency to build new science laboratories, language laboratories and improved sixth form study provision. A grant of a further £170,000 has allowed the building of a new Mathematics suite, completed in the Spring of 1999.

In 2009, Colbayns High School and Bishops Park merged to become the Clacton Coastal Academy.

== Ofsted ==
The Overall Evaluation from Ofsted (2004) identified staff turn-over as a root cause of poor behaviour in the classroom. In 2014 it was a good school. The school has grown in recent years, particularly at Sixth Form level. In 2003, Clacton Coastal Academy became the first British school to join US-run company Edison Learning formerly known as the Edison Project.

== Academics ==
It is possible for a student to spend all their secondary and sixth-form career at Clacton Coastal Academy, as the sixth form offer is broaden by co-operating with the University of Essex.

=== Key Stage 3 ===
The UK National Curriculum states that every pupil in Year 7 and Year 8, Key Stage 3 has a right to a broad defined curriculum.

=== Key Stage 4 ===
The Curriculum aims to build up an Attainment 8 score and with it a good Progress 8 score, by choosing an EBacc combination.

== Notable Former Pupils ==
Lord Bassam of Brighton - Labour Party (UK) politician and Shadow Minister.
