= Lawford =

Village in Essex, England

Coordinates: 51.940°N 1.045°E

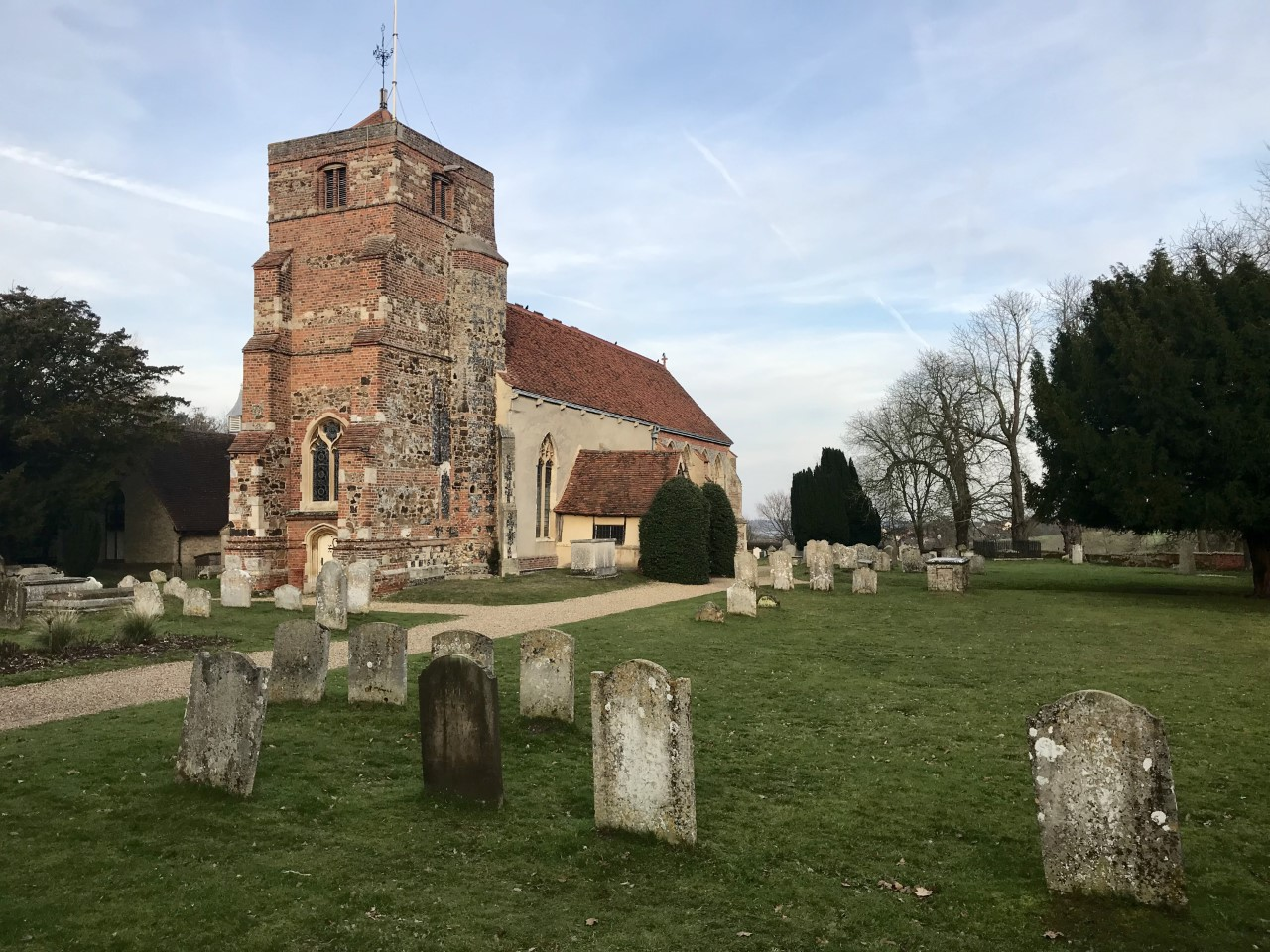
- St Mary's Church, Lawford

- Location within Essex
- Population: 4,790 (Parish, 2021)
- OS grid reference: TM092310
  - London: 55 mi (89 km) SW
- District: Tendring
- Shire county: Essex
- Region: East
- Country: England
- Sovereign state: United Kingdom
- Post town: Manningtree
- Postcode district: CO11
- Dialling code: 01206
- Police: Essex
- Fire: Essex
- Ambulance: East of England
- UK Parliament: Harwich and North Essex

Lawford is a large village and civil parish in the Tendring district of northeast Essex, England. It is approximately 6 miles (10 km) northeast from the centre of Colchester and west of, and contiguous with, Manningtree. Mistley merges with the east side of Manningtree. Lawford has two junior schools, Lawford Church of England Primary School and Highfields Primary School, situated near Manningtree High School. At the 2021 census the parish had a population of 4,790.

The 14th-century parish Church of St Mary is a Grade I listed building.

Ogilvie Hall is the name of the village hall on Wignall Street, and there is a more modern facility called The Venture Centre off Bromley Road.

The Leftley Housing Estate, situated toward the east of the village, is a typical 1960s development of mainly semi-detached houses and bungalows.

More recent housing developments include the Summers Park and Lawford Dale housing estates, constructed by Rose Builders, and Manningtree Park, which, as of 2023, is currently under construction.

The area includes a number of smallholdings originally built by the Land Settlement Association.
