= Alex Porter =

English volleyball player (born 1980)

Alex Michael Porter
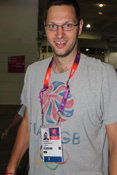
- Alex Porter Olympics (July 2012)
- Born: 5 July 1980 (age 45); Colchester, Essex, England, U.K.
- Occupations: Sportsman, TV commentator, Volleyball player & coach
- Years active: 1980–present
- Known for: GB Men's Volleyball Captain
- Height: 6 ft 9 in (206 cm)

Alex Michael Porter (born 5 July 1980) is an English former volleyball player, commentator, and former Great Britain volleyball Captain. He also managed the Great Britain Men's Volleyball Team for the 2012 European Championship. He was a court side expert pundit at the 2012 Summer Olympics and Paralympics 2012 Games, covering the volleyball and sitting volleyball competitions matches held at Earls Court & ExCeL venue.

During the games he joined up with Jonathan Legard to commentate for the BBC's live coverage of the Olympic Volleyball, including the men's Gold medal match.

== Biography ==
Porter grew up in the village of Kirby-le-Soken. He started playing volleyball at Tendring High School aged 11 before joining Tendring Volleyball club later that year. In 1996 he joined his first National Volleyball League Team, Essex Estonians, who played in the Division 3. From here, he signed for London Malory who were reigning League and Cup champions. In his first session for them, he became a starting 6 player and gained his first England cap against Scotland. A knee injury at the end of the 1998–99 season meant he missed the beginning of the 1999–00 season. Halfway through the season when he recovered from surgery he signed for Malory's rivals, London Docklands. After 2 years of commuting to London from his Sheffield home he transferred to Sheffield Volleyball Club. In his first year with them they narrowly missed out on promotion to his previous team, London Docklands.

After finishing his university education, Porter moved to Sweden to play semi-professionally in Sweden for Vingåker VK (Sweden) and then professionally in Austria for Sokol V (Austria).

Porter then became a community development coach. He used his experience to encourage schools to take up volleyball in the Tendring and Colchester area, working with primary and secondary schools and establishing a recreational team at Tendring Volleyball Club.

In the summer of 2011 he started to work in finance but maintained volleyball links. He and fellow Tendring Volleyball Club coach Neil Masters took over the coaching roles of England South Boys Cadets and won the 2011 UK School Games and won silver at the 2012 School Games. Again working with Neil Masters, the pair of them have gained Tendring Volleyball Club's Men's team back to back promotions, from Division 3 East to Division 1. During the same period they reached the National Shield semi-final 2009–10 and the National Cup semi-final 2010–11. In 2011–12 the team won the National Shield against Boathouse Volleyball Club at the National Volleyball Centre.

== Volleyball career ==
Combined England and GB Caps; 75 international caps

Coaching at; Head Coach EVL Tendring 2, Assistant Coach NVL Men,

Former Coaching at; Sheffield Hallam University, Vingaker Women's Team (Sweden), Sokol School (Austria), Martinus Men's 5th Team (the Netherlands)

Former Player at; Men's GB Team, Tendring, City of Sheffield, Sheffield Hallam University, London Docklands, London Malory, Vingaker VK (Sweden), Martinus (the Netherlands)
