= Rowhedge =

Village in Essex, England

Coordinates: 51.8569°N 0.9474°E

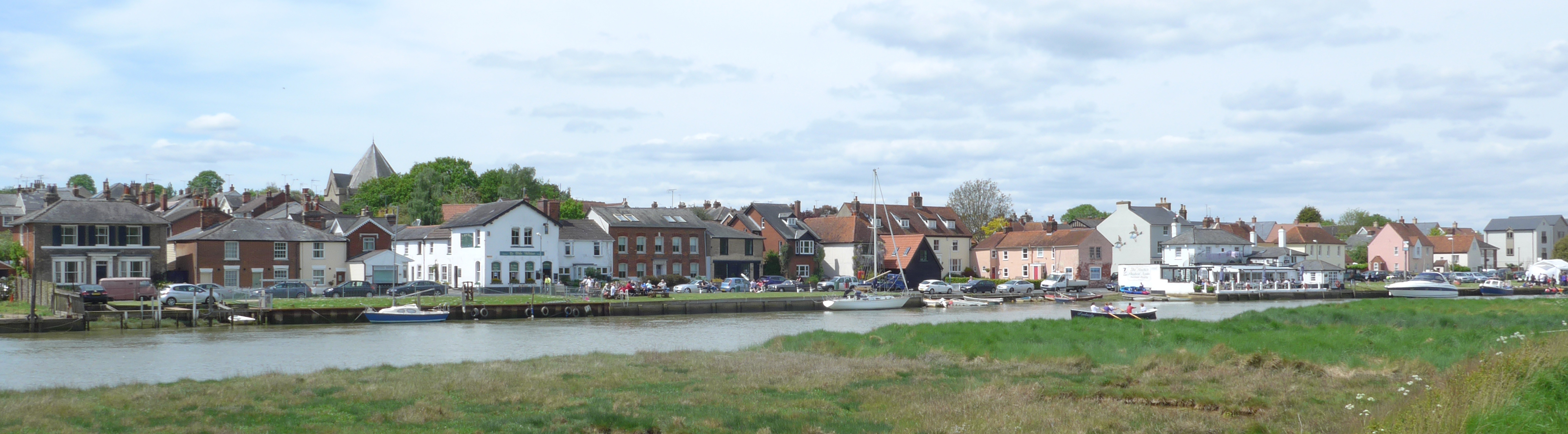
- Rowhedge waterfront

- Location within Essex
- OS grid reference: TM029217
- Civil parish: East Donyland
- District: City of Colchester District
- Shire county: Essex
- Region: East
- Country: England
- Sovereign state: United Kingdom
- Post town: COLCHESTER
- Postcode district: CO5
- Dialling code: 01206
- Police: Essex
- Fire: Essex
- Ambulance: East of England
- UK Parliament: Harwich and North Essex

Rowhedge is a village in the Colchester borough of Essex, England. It is located just over 3 miles (4.8 km) south-east of Colchester town centre and is part of the civil parish of East Donyland.

== Geography ==
Rowhedge is on the right (west) bank of the tidal River Colne and is the first settlement downstream from Colchester. The small town of Wivenhoe is on the opposite bank, but slightly farther downstream; Fingringhoe is just to the south, on the opposite bank of the Roman River.

Throughout the 20th century, Rowhedge and Wivenhoe were linked by a ferry. A barrier, similar to the one on the River Thames which shields London, was completed on the Colne in 1994. Rowhedge, Wivenhoe and Colchester all benefit from its protection from flooding.

The main thoroughfare in Rowhedge, the High Street, runs parallel to the Colne. At one time, it connected two areas of ship and boat construction and maintenance – the Upper Yard to the north, and the Lower Yard to the south. These were often known as 'Up Street' and 'Down Street' respectively. With the decline of ship building, housing estates have been built in both areas.

== History ==
The history of Rowhedge is connected directly to the River Colne; ship or boat building and the crewing of many vessels go back to the nineteenth century, maritime pursuits in general even further. The Essex earthquake of 22 April 1884, damaged several buildings in the village, even shaking a man off his ladder while he was repairing the village's school clock. Colchester Rowing Club was established in the village in 1896 when the population was about 1,100.

Up till 1918, Rowhedge could boast of its own brewery. A look at the map of the village at the turn of the nineteenth century on page 16 of Margaret Leather's book Saltwater Village (1977) reveals no fewer than six public houses; in 1970 there were four, now (2012), there are just two.

In response to a £1,000 prize being offered by the Daily Mail newspaper for the first Briton to fly a mile, an 'areohydroplane' (the term 'seaplane' was not yet in use), was designed and constructed by Jack Humphrey of Halstead in 1909. Several unsuccessful attempts at flight were made, both from the sea and land, after which the contraption was broken up; its floats ended their days in Rowhedge Ironworks in the Upper Yard.

Many village inhabitants were involved in fishing for oysters and scallops that came from as far afield as the French, Belgian and Dutch coasts and the carrying of salmon and lobster from Ireland and Norway to Britain.
Fishing for sprats could be a relatively worthless business. If there were too many 'good' catches, the Rowhedge smacks had little choice but to sail to their home village and off-load their fish, which might be sold for just a few pennies for manure in the nearby fields.

One of the pre-First World War village characters was John (Jack) Spitty – salvager (saving goods by removing them from ship-wrecks), pub licensee, fisherman and smuggler. His use of a bedroom in the Royal Oak public house when he was the licensee to hide boxes of Dutch cigars was brought to a halt by his wife. She put her foot down after the pub was unsuccessfully searched by customs men. He would also sometimes swap sprats for coal at sea after a rumbustious verbal exchange with an obliging collier's skipper; the fuel was used in his smack's shrimp boiler.

During the First World War, a bridge was built across the river to enable members of the nearby Colchester garrison to board trains at Wivenhoe when on their way to Gallipoli. It was inspected by King George V in April 1916, but dismantled after the war.

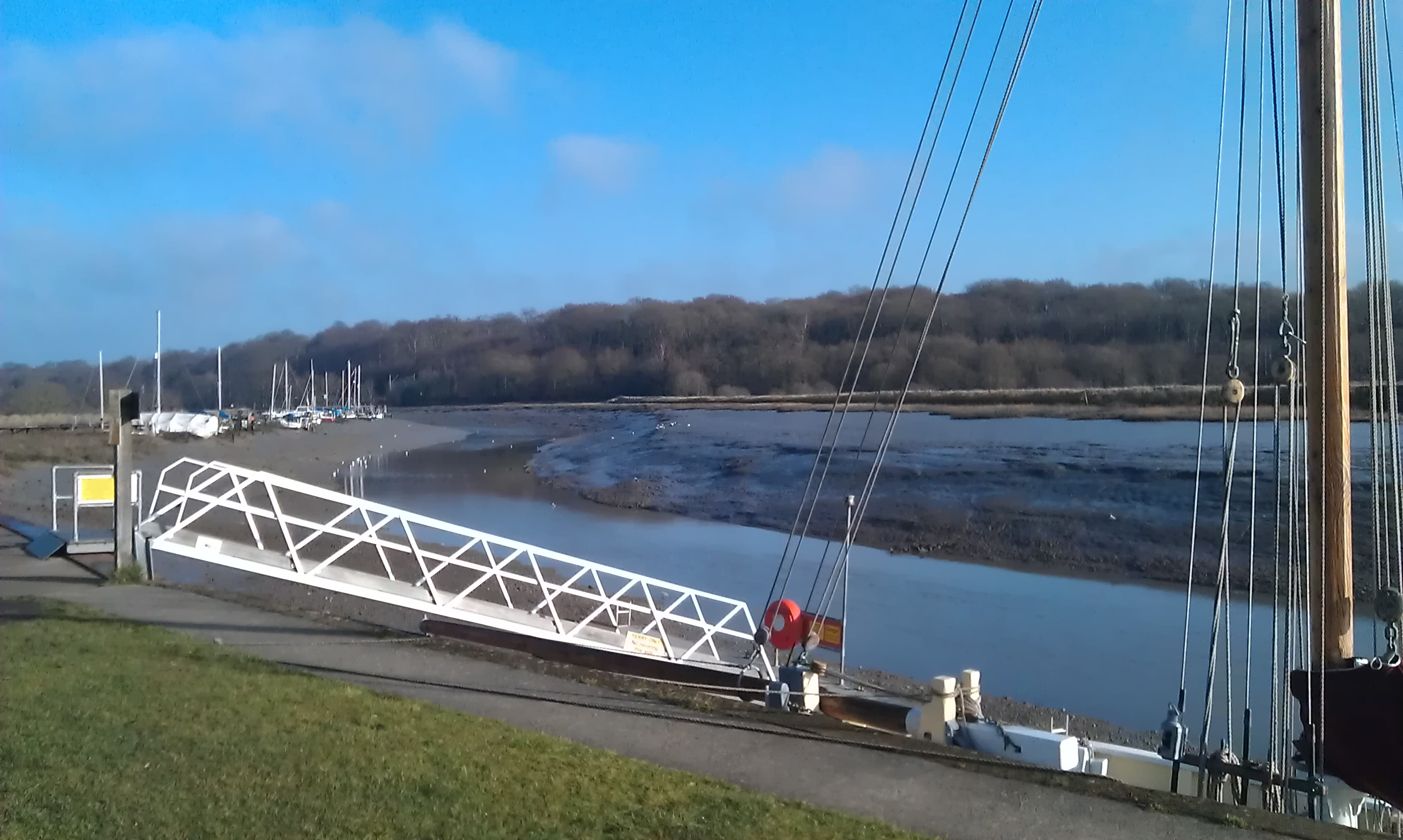
Looking north along the River Colne towards Colchester from Rowhedge Quay

=== Inter-war years ===
Lifeboats and small oil tankers were constructed and maintained at the two yards, contributing towards the local economy in the 1920s and 30s. Many boats were fabricated in the Upper Yard for contracts in the Sudan. This took kit form; the various parts would be dismantled, crated or wired together, sent out to the African country and reassembled for use on the Nile.

The extraction of sand and gravel near the village began in the 1930s.

=== Second World War and after ===
Demand for such building materials increased after the Second World War to repair bomb-damaged buildings, particularly in London. During that conflict, various types of construction, apart from ships, including then secret Mulberry Harbour components for the D-Day landings, were also built, both in Rowhedge and Wivenhoe.

There was no apprenticeship scheme in the yards in the 1950s; new staff, usually workers sons, were taken-on on an ad-hoc basis.

The port was at its busiest in the 1980s, being involved in the miners' strike (bringing in imported coal) and also handling anything from fish-meal to granite.

Up to the 1990s, Rowhedge was used for the importation of loads deemed too small for the larger ports or those ships that could not get up the river to Colchester. But with the containerisation of many loads, the writing was on the wall for the port; it closed officially in 2001. More recently, some fishing and leisure sailing are all that remain.

== Leisure pursuits ==
=== Flower Show ===
The Flower Show, which was held annually up to the First World War, involved the erection of marquees on the grassland of the nearby Donyland Hall or Brewery meadow. The event was not confined to displaying flowers; fruit, vegetables, crocheting and knitting were all shown.

=== Regatta ===
The Regatta, believed to go back to the eighteenth century, has been run annually. Until 1913, it was based on alternate years in Rowhedge and Wivenhoe. Funding was boosted by donations from the King (Edward VII and his successor, (George V) and the Prince of Wales. This Royal patronage was always assumed to be due to the fact that the captain of the Britannia, (the King's racing yacht), John Carter was from Rowhedge. The Regatta has declined and been revived on numerous occasions. Apart from the main event, i.e. the races, which at its peak, involved a total of 64 boats. A typical year might feature an appearance by the boys from HMS Ganges (a Royal Navy training establishment), tug-of-war (across the river), negotiating a 'greasy' pole and a band. One year even featured the unexpected appearance of a Royal Navy minesweeper.

The Regatta was revived in 1962 and again in 2002.

=== Raft race ===
Begun in 1986, the raft race was held on the stretch of water between Rowhedge and Brightlingsea. Teams from the army and British Telecom were among those involved in one year.

== See also ==
- Donyland Lodge
