= The Yellow House School =

Location
- 1 Alderford Street; Sible Hedingham, Essex, CO9 3HX; England; 51.9737°N 0.5946°E

Information
- Type: Private special school
- Established: June 2002
- Founder: Debbie Pester
- Local authority: Essex County Council
- Proprietor: Debra Pester
- Department for Education URN: 134398 Tables
- Ofsted: Reports
- Head teacher: David Ollier
- Gender: Mixed
- Age range: 13–17
- Enrolment: 20 (2019)
- Capacity: 15
- Website: www.theyellowhouseschool.essex.sch.uk

The Yellow House School is a 13–17 mixed, private special school and sixth form in Sible Hedingham, Essex, England. It was established in June 2002 by Debbie Pester and caters for children with Tourette's, ADHD and ADD, autism spectrum disorders, and other sensory issues.

== History ==
The Yellow House School was established in June 2002 with one pupil by Debbie Pester, with the help and support from James Pester. Pester had been searching for a new career path and with experience of working with vulnerable and special needs children as a head teacher in a range of settings, had allowed her to identify a gap in the provision available for children with anxiety disorders and other similar problems. She noted these children commonly find it impossible to cope in a mainstream school environment and the unsuitable special educational alternatives available, which are dominated by those with severe anti-social behaviour, resulting in her decision to open a private special school by raising the funds and buying the premises.

It was rated 'good' by Ofsted following its inspection in June 2019, having previously been rated as 'requires improvement' in 2017.
