= Harris Academy Benfleet =

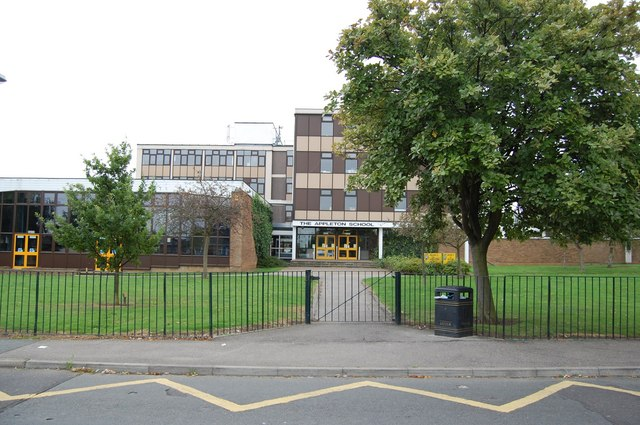

Location
- Croft Road; Benfleet, Essex, SS7 5RN; England; 51°33′48″N 0°33′11″E

Information
- Type: Academy; Comprehensive
- Motto: Achieving Excellence
- Established: 1965
- Department for Education URN: 136579 Tables
- Ofsted: Reports
- Gender: Coeducational
- Age: 11 to 18
- Enrolment: 1600

Harris Academy Benfleet is a comprehensive secondary school and sixth form with academy status in Croft Road, Benfleet, Essex, England. It has 1,600 students from school years 7 to 13, and roughly 100 teachers. Until 2026, it was called Appleton School.

== History ==
The school was built in 1962, and opened in 1965. The first headteacher of the school was Edward Haines from its opening until 1974. Since then there have been four other headteachers.

- William Lovegrove (1974-1991)
- Guy Naylor (1991-2004)
- Karen Kerridge (2004-2021)
- Sarah Cox (2021–Present)

The school is part of a multi-academy trust, the Harris Federation. Until 2026, it was in the Compass Education Trust.

== School performance ==
As of 2026, the school's most recent full inspection by Ofsted was in 2019, with a judgement of Good.

In 2022, the school's Progress 8 benchmark at GCSE was -0.88, compared to -0.21 in Essex as a whole and -0.03 nationally. 38% of children at the school achieved grade 5 or above in English and maths GCSEs, compared to 48% in Essex and 50% nationally. 97% of children at the school went on to further education or employment, compared to 94% in Essex and 94% nationally. 45% of children at the school were entered for the English Baccalaureate, compared to 36% in Essex and 39% nationally.
