= Hedingham School =

School in Sible Hedingham, Essex, England

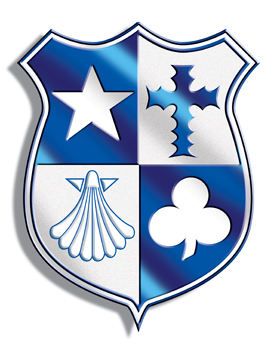

Location
- Yeldham Road; Halstead, Essex, CO9 3QH; England
- Coordinates: 51°59′07″N 0°35′20″E

Information
- Type: Academy
- Department for Education URN: 139153 Tables
- Ofsted: Reports
- Headteacher: Paul Finch
- Gender: Coeducational
- Age: 11 to 18
- Enrolment: 1175
- Houses: Thomason, Moynes, Hawkwood and Symonds.
- Colours: Blue, Crème
- Website: http://www.hedingham.essex.sch.uk

Hedingham Secondary School and Sixth Form is a coeducational secondary school and sixth form with academy status, situated in Christmas Fields in Sible Hedingham, Essex, England.

== Curriculum ==
The school is under the leadership of Mr Paul Finch and offers a wide range of subjects, such as rural science, throughout the year groups including Sixth Form.

== Recent results ==
In 2011, Hedingham School saw its best ever A Level and AS Level results with pass rates of 99% and 96% respectively. The school has gained GCSE results which are higher than its previous records. 69% of students gained 5+ A*-C grades including Maths and English.
