= King Harold Business and Enterprise Academy =

King Harold Academy

Location
- Broomstick Hall Road; Waltham Abbey, Essex, EN9 1LF; England
- Coordinates: 51°41′22″N 0°00′54″E

Information
- Type: Academy
- Established: 1952
- Local authority: Essex
- Department for Education URN: 136342 Tables
- Ofsted: Reports
- Headteacher: Andrew Jones
- Gender: Coeducational
- Age: 11 to 16
- Enrolment: ~689
- Houses: Pankhurst, Churchill, Dickens, Rowling, Ennis and Hawkins
- Colours: Black, Yellow, White
- Website: www.kha-tkat.org

King Harold Business and Enterprise Academy (formerly King Harold School) is a secondary comprehensive school and academy in Waltham Abbey, Essex. Students attending the school are between the ages of 11 and 16.

== School performance and inspection judgements ==
In 2012, inspection by Ofsted found the school to Require Improvement. As of 2022, the school's most recent inspection judgement was in 2016, when it was found to be Good.

== History ==
The school was founded in 1952 and was named after the last Anglo-Saxon king, Harold Godwinson, who is buried at Waltham Abbey.
