= Sible Hedingham =

Village and civil parish in Essex, England

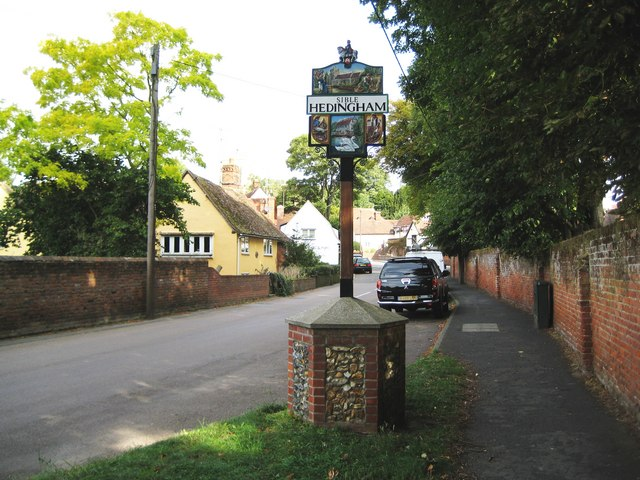
- Sible Hedingham village sign

- Location within Essex
- Population: 4,831 (Parish, 2021); 4,291 (Built up area, 2021)
- OS grid reference: TL7734
- Civil parish: Sible Hedingham
- District: Braintree
- Shire county: Essex
- Region: East
- Country: England
- Sovereign state: United Kingdom
- Post town: HALSTEAD
- Postcode district: CO9
- Dialling code: 01787
- Police: Essex
- Fire: Essex
- Ambulance: East of England
- UK Parliament: Braintree

Sible Hedingham (/ˌsɪbəl ˈhɛdɪŋəm/ SIB-əl HED-ing-əm) is a village and civil parish in the county of Essex, England. The village is located within the Colne Valley, in the northern region of Essex, close to both the Suffolk and Cambridgeshire borders, situated on the A1017 road. Outside of the village, the parish contains numerous smaller Hamlets. The village is 21.3 miles (34 km) north of Chelmsford. At the 2021 census the parish had a population of 4,831 and the built up area had a population of 4,291.

== Toponymy ==
The meaning of the name Sible Hedingham is uncertain. The University of Nottingham Key to English Place Names website says it could mean:

- Homestead/village of Hethni's people
- Homestead/village at Hethni's place
- Alternatively, the first element could be 'landing-place'. Sibil, widow of Geoffrey of Lavington held land here in 1237.

Hedingham has been spelt with a selection of spellings over the years, as identified by Reaney in The Place Names of Essex. These include:

- Haingheham (1086)
- Hegham (1243)
- Hythingham (1349)
- Hynnyngham (1486)

== History ==
The oldest sign of occupation in the parish was found at Red House Farm in c.1960 by a Mr H.D. Johnson. The flint tool was identified by the British Museum to be from the Palaeolithic era, which was before 10,000 BC. In 1929, Bronze Age finds were discovered near Tower House.

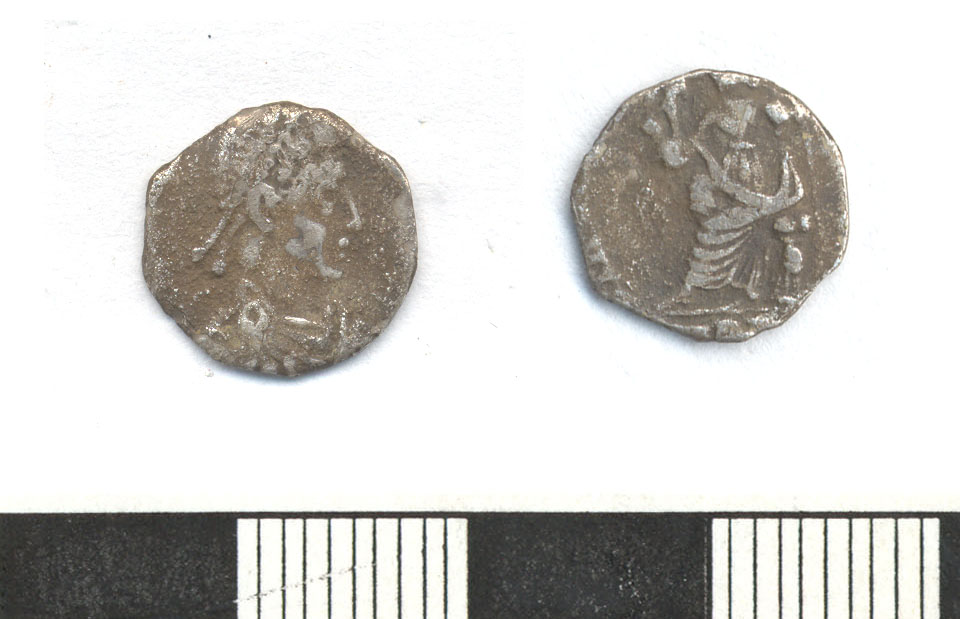
Roman Coin Hoard

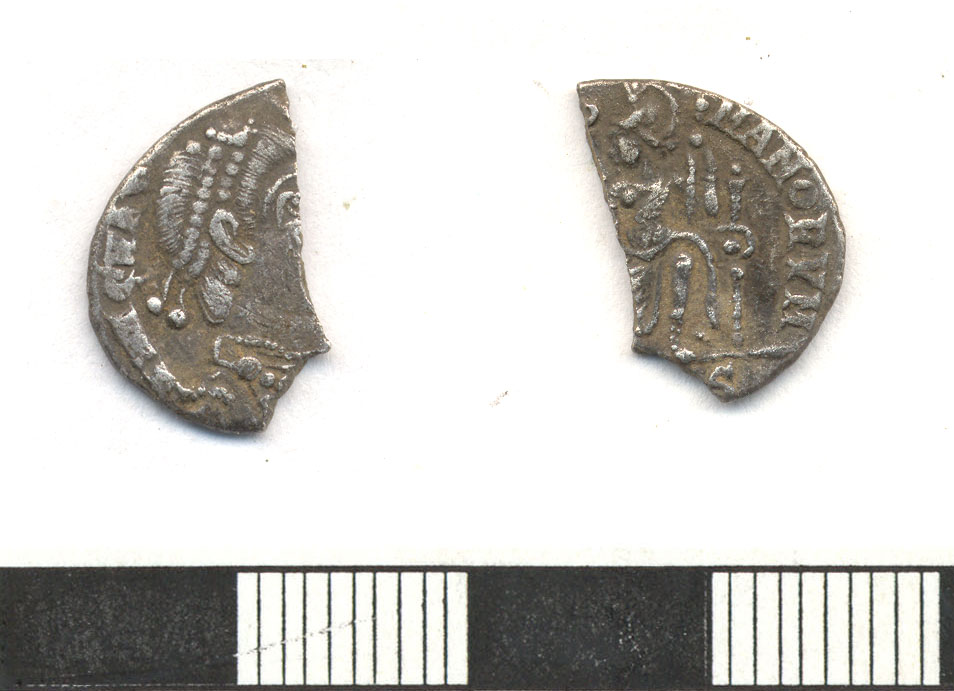
Roman Coin Hoard

During the Roman period, a Roman military road, the Via Devana, passed through the parish, while a piece of Roman mirror and a speculum was found in the village. A possible Roman pottery kiln was found near Cobbs Fenn, while a possible Roman millstone was found just over a kilometre from the village. Further evidence of occupation in the area can be seen in St Peter's Church, where Roman bricks and tiles have been used within its walls, while a hoard of coins containing 1 denarius of Octavian; 18 siliquae (5 fragments) to 402 and 1 toilet implement fragment was found in 2005.

The Domesday Book of 1086 lists the village together with Castle Hedingham as one, and amongst the lands given to Roger Bigod by the king, William the Conqueror. The land included woodland for 70 pigs that was in total valued at £4. The village has also been known as "Hengham Sybyle", and in 1190 a Benedictine nunnery was opened. The village came under the county division the Hundred of Hinckford, which by 1327 was the third-richest hundred in Essex. It was during the reign of Henry III that the separate parishes of Castle and Sible Hedingham first appeared. Between the 12th and 14th century, the village was one of the centres for production of the pottery, Hedingham Ware, which consisted of decorated and glazed finewares, mainly jugs, and grey-firing coarsewares.

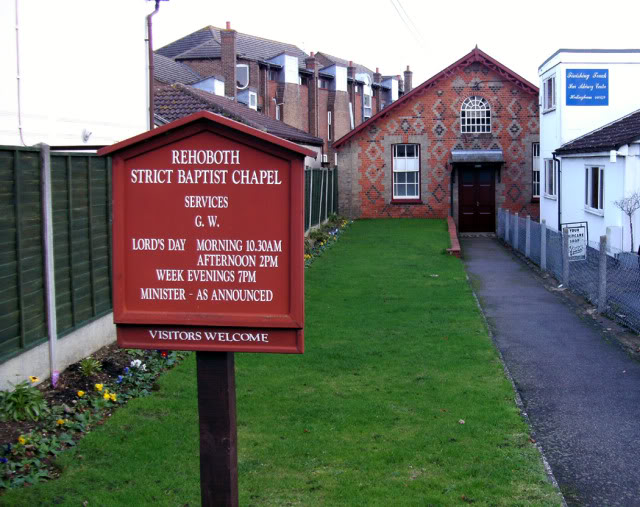
Rehoboth Strict Baptist Chapel, Sible Hedingham

In 1807, a Baptist chapel was opened, while a Quakers chapel had also been opened but was closed by 1833. In 1835, Sible Hedingham became part of the Halstead Poor Law Union. Prior to the union, the parish had opened a workhouse in two cottages in 1745. The village was connected to the railway in 1861, when the Sible and Castle Hedingham railway station was opened on the Colne Valley and Halstead Railway. In 1863, Sible Hedingham was the site of one of the last 19th-century witchcraft accusations in England. The victim is now known as "Dummy, the Witch of Sible Hedingham". Only a year earlier, The Hedingham Gas Works were opened in Castle Hedingham to provide gas street lighting for the two villages. By 1863, the village had a National School which served 170 pupils, and held an annual fair for "toys and pleasure" on Easter Tuesday. In 1872, Sible Hedingham came under the Halstead Rural Sanitary district, the replacement for the Poor Law Union, before becoming Halstead Rural District in 1894.

In 1901, the Elsenham, Thaxted and Bardfield Light Railway (ET&BLR) received permission via the Bardfield and Sible Hedingham Light Railway Order 1901 of 18 November 1901, to build the Bardfield and Sible Hedingham Light Railway, which would have linked the ET&BLR at Great Bardfield to the Great Eastern Railway at Sible Hedingham. However, the ET&BLR failed to receive permission to be built and a further attempt to build a light railway from Sible Hedingham to Ongar by the Central Essex Light Railway failed too. At the start of the 20th century, the village was more segmented, with Church Street separated from the rest of the village and the existing commercial centre had not yet been built.

During World War I, the Royal Flying Corps founded a landing strip near to Southey Green, while during World War II, a bomb landed on Rippers Joinery works in February 1941. In between the wars, the village had become home to Rachel Barrett, who upon her death in 1953, left Lamb Cottage to her niece, Gwyneth, whose husband was the poet J. Redwood Anderson. Redwood Anderson would die in the cottage in 1964. The Colne Valley and Halstead Railway ceased operating passenger services in 1961, being used solely for freight until it finally closed in 1964. The station was taken down in 1973 and rebuilt as part of the heritage Colne Valley Railway. A year later, the parish transferred to the newly created Braintree District as part of local government reorganisation.

== Geology ==
Sible Hedingham parish has been surveyed, along with areas around Castle Hedingham, Great Yeldham and Wethersfield, by the Institute of Geological Sciences. In their survey in 1981, they found the following:

Period	Drift or Solid	Type
Recent and Pleistocene	Drift	Alluvium
Recent and Pleistocene	Drift	River Terrace Deposits
Recent and Pleistocene	Drift	Head
Recent and Pleistocene	Drift	Head Gravel
Recent and Pleistocene	Drift	Boulder Clay
Recent and Pleistocene	Drift	Glacial Silt
Recent and Pleistocene	Drift	Glacial Sand and Gravels, upper
Recent and Pleistocene	Drift	Barham Sands and Gravels
Recent and Pleistocene	Drift	Kesgrave Sands and Gravels
Pleistocene	Solid	Red Crag
Eocene	Solid	London Clay
Palaeocene	Solid	Lower London Tertiaries - Woolwich and Reading Beds, Thanet Beds
Cretaceous	Solid	Upper Chalk

== Governance ==
=== Parliamentary seat ===
Sible Hedingham comes under the Braintree Parliamentary constituency which Sir James Cleverly of the Conservative Party has held since 2015.

Prior to sitting in the Braintree Parliamentary constituency, Sible Hedingham parish sat within the following constituencies:

Constituency name	Years of operation	Reference
Essex	1290–1832	
North Essex	1832–1868	
East Essex	1868–1885	
Saffron Walden	1885–1974	

=== Local Government ===
Sible Hedingham sits within the non-metropolitan county of Essex, governed by Essex County Council; and the non-Metropolitan district of Braintree governed by Braintree District Council. Sible Hedingham is within the Hedingham ward of Braintree District Council. The civil parish is managed by Sible Hedingham Parish council.

=== Twinning ===
The village is twinned with the French commune of Choisy-au-Bac, located in Picardy region, Oise department (c. 80 km north of Paris, near Compiègne).

== Demographics ==
=== Population ===
The population of the parish has been recorded since the first national census of 1801. The following table shows the population total between the first census until 1971:

Census	Population	Source
1801	1866	
1811	1702	
1821	2060	
1831	2194	
1841	2322	
1851	2364	
1881	1926	
1891	1785	
1901	1701	
1911	1789	
1921	1762	
1931	2149	
1951	2251	
1961	2377	
1971	3326	

The parish had a population of 4,800 according to the 2021 census, and covers some 2,123 hectares (5,246 acres).

=== Ethnicity ===
At the 2021 census, the parish population was recorded as having the following breakdown of ethnicity:

Ethnicity background	% of population - Sible Hedingham	% of population - U.K.
Asian, Asian British or Asian Welsh	1.1	9.6
Black, Black British, Black Welsh, Caribbean or African	0.4	4.2
Mixed or Multiple ethnic groups	1.3	3.0
White	96.6	81.0
Other ethnic groups	0.6	2.2

=== Age groups ===
The population of 4,800 at the 2021 census fell into the following age groups:

Age group	% of population - Sible Hedingham	% of population - U.K.	
Age group	0-4	6.3	5.4
5-9	7.0	5.9	
10-14	5.7	6.1	
15-19	4.7	5.8	
20-24	4.9	6.0	
25-29	5.4	6.5	
30-34	6.5	7.0	
35-39	6.2	6.8	
40-44	6.1	6.5	
45-49	5.7	6.1	
50-54	7.3	6.8	
55-59	7.0	6.7	
60-64	5.8	5.9	
65-69	5.8	4.9	
70-74	5.3	4.7	
75-79	5.1	4.0	
80-84	2.6	2.5	
85 and over	2.6	2.5	

=== Economics and Education ===
The employment activity within the parish was recorded at the 2021 census as:

Employment status	% of population - Sible Hedingham	% of population - U.K.
Employed	61.8	57.4
Unemployed	2.5	3.5
Economically inactive	35.7	39.1

In the 2021 census it was recorded that the working population in the parish completed the following hours per week:

Hours per week	% of population - Sible Hedingham	% of population - U.K.
Part-time - 15 hours or less worked	12.7	10.3
Part-time - 16 to 30 hours worked	19.1	19.5
Full-time - 31 to 48 hours worked	55.3	59.1
Full-time - 49 or more hours worked	12.9	11.1

For those who did work, the breakdown at the 2021 census of the distance people travelled to work or worked from home was:

Distance travelled to work	% of population - Sible Hedingham	% of population - U.K.
Works mainly from home	26.2	31.5
Less than 10 km	15.8	35.4
10 km to less than 30 km	28.3	14.4
30 km and over	7.4	4.3
Other	22.4	14.5

At the 2021 census, those of the parish population over the age of 16 had the following qualifications:

Level of qualifications	% of population - Sible Hedingham	% of population - U.K.
No qualifications	18.1	18.1
Level 1, 2 or 3 qualifications	48.6	39.9
Apprenticeship	7.3	5.3
Level 4 qualifications and above	23.4	33.9
Other qualifications	2.7	2.8

== Transport ==
The A1017 runs through the middle of the village, connecting Braintree to Haverhill. It is served by bus routes 60, run by Flagfinders, while routes 88 and 89 are operated by Konectbus Essex and Suffolk.

== Economy ==
The parish has a strong agricultural economy, with cereal crops being the mainstay. The village was a centre of production for Hedingham Ware pottery between the 12th and 14th century, and was previously home to a Tannery in Alderford Street. Formerly a quarry for sand and gravel operated until the 1980s at Foxborough Hill, while there was several Brickworks operated by both the Corder and Gentry families but these had closed by the early 1950s. At their peak in 1900, the Brickworks employed around 500 people and were making about eight million bricks a year. Ripper's Joinery Works opened in 1899 and operated in the village until it closed in 2009. The village previously had a Maltings in Alderford Street, with two further Maltings near Wash Farm, where the locally grown hops were dried. A wood was planted in the parish to provide the hop poles. The parish also previously had two windmills, one was at Cut Maple while the other was in Lamb Lane, while there were watermills located in Alderford Street and on the border of the parish at Hulls Mill.

The village had been home to Premdor Windows factory, which opened in 1899 and at its peak employed over 700 people, but closed in 2009 with the loss of 86 jobs. The site was redeveloped by Bloor Homes, who as part of the 193 home development built a £700,000 business hub which is now run by Braintree District Council. The village was also home to a dairy, with Roy Tanner opening the dairy in Church Street in 1949. The dairy was sold to Milk Link in 2002, who closed the site four years later. The building was destroyed by fire in 2023. The village is home to the depot of the bus company Konectbus Essex and Suffolk, formerly known as Hedingham & Chambers.

== Local services ==
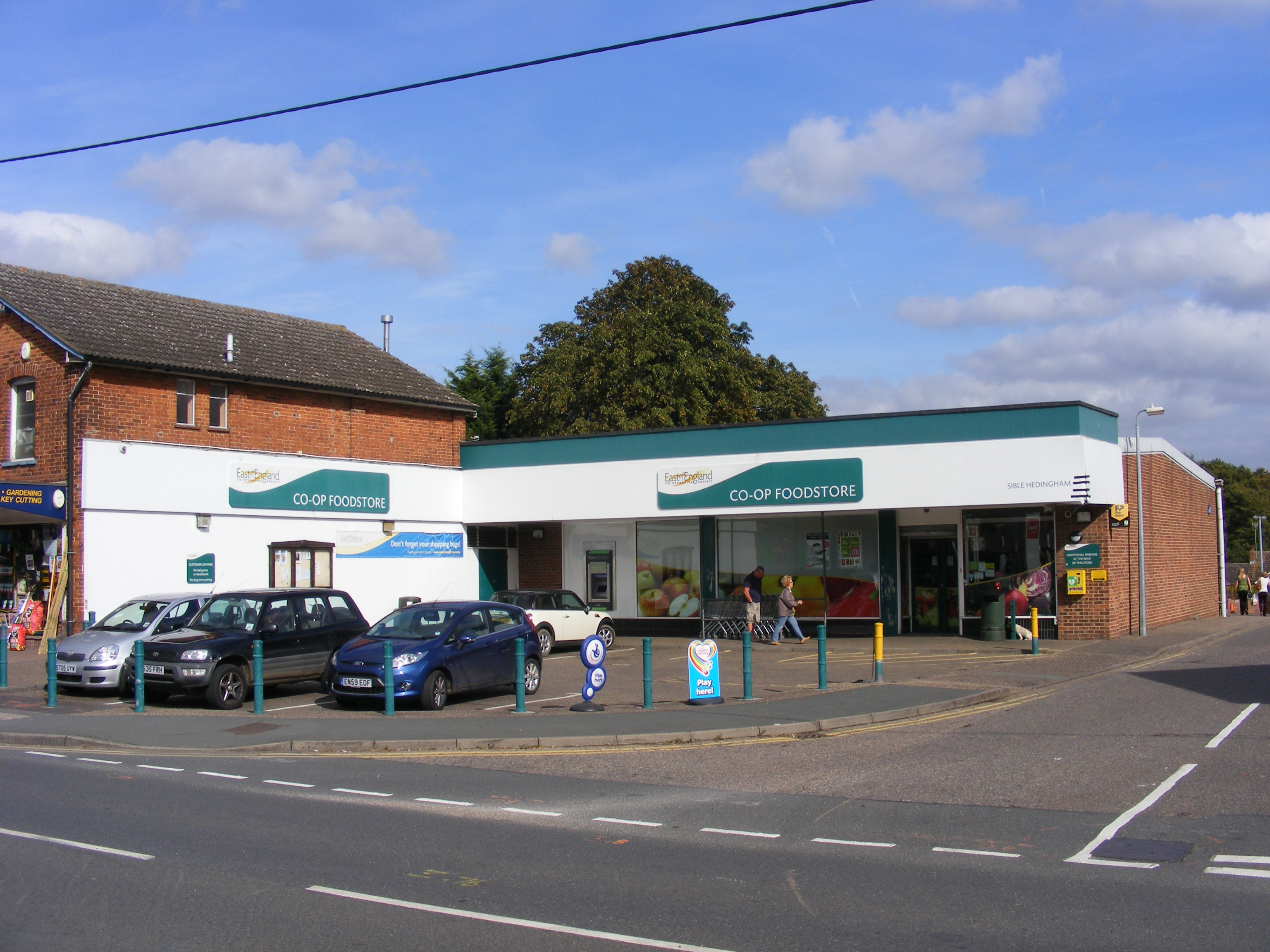
East of England Co-Operative Supermarket

The village is seen by Braintree District Council as one of the districts six key villages, larger villages that provide essential services to the outlying smaller villages and hamlets. The village is served by a supermarket.

=== Education ===
The village is served by St Peter's Church of England Primary School and Hedingham School and Sixth Form. It is also home to The Yellow House School, an independent school for pupils with special needs.

=== Health ===
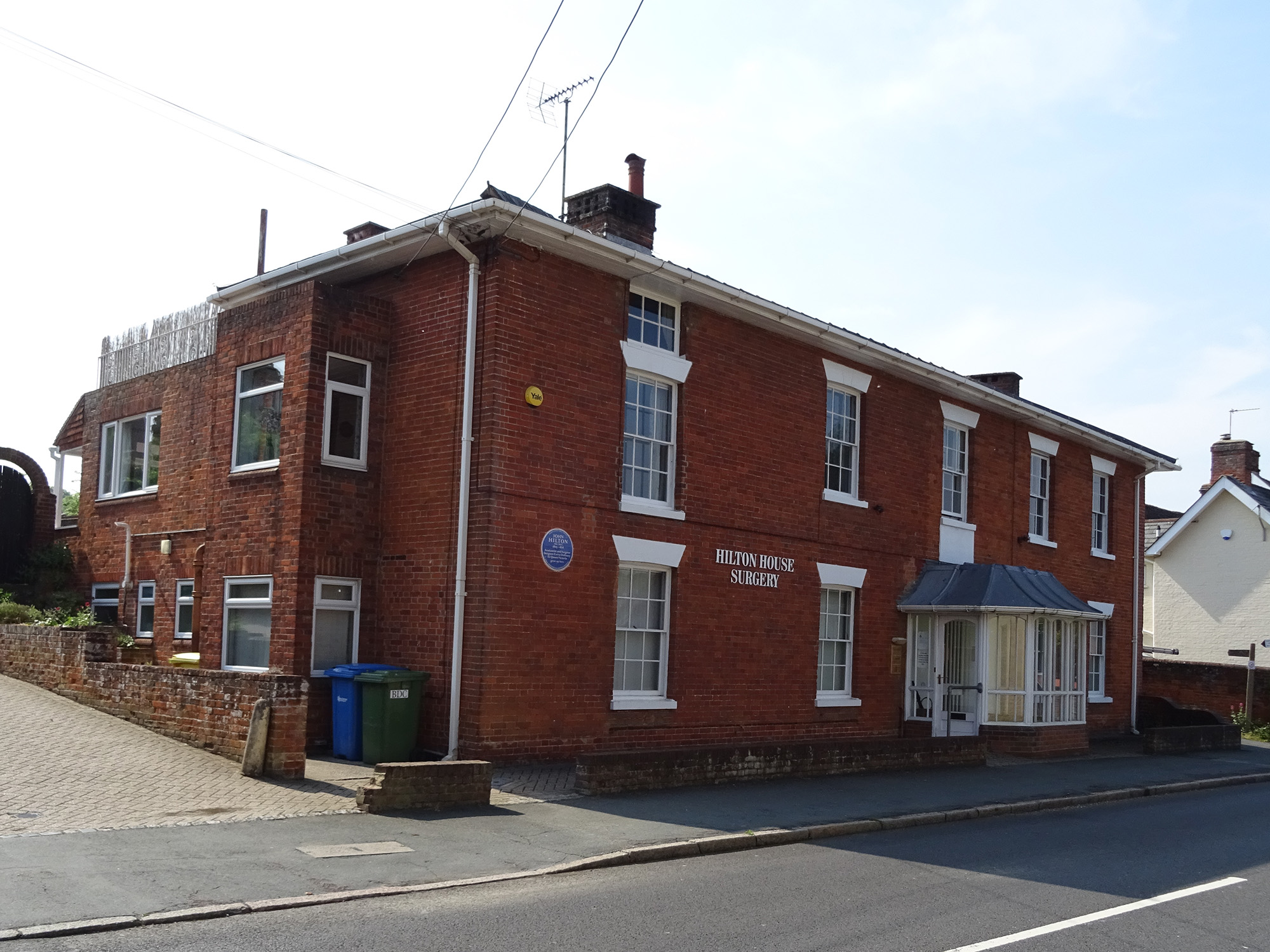
Hilton House Surgery

Hedingham Medical Centre runs a surgery at Hilton House. A new medical centre to serve both Hedingham's is planned to be built in Sible Hedingham. The nearest hospital services are provided at both Halstead Hospital and Braintree Community Hospital, with the local Accident and Emergency service located at Broomfield Hospital.

=== Police & Fire Brigade ===
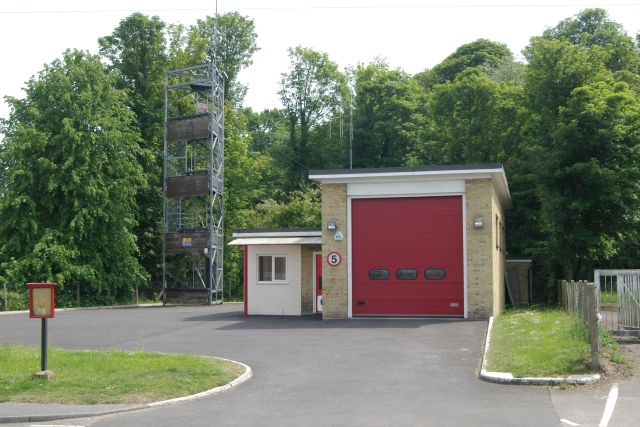
Sible Hedingham Fire Station

Essex Police is the local constabulary, with Sible Hedingham coming under the region of Halstead North. The nearest stations are Chelmford and Colchester. The nearest fire station is at Sible Hedingham and is an on-call service provided by Essex County Fire and Rescue Service.

=== Recreation ===
The village is served by Sible Hedingham Park.

== Sport ==
The village is home to Hedinghams United, a small amateur football team competing in the Essex and Suffolk Border Football League. The former quarry at Foxborough Hill is now a venue for Motocross.

== Hamlets ==
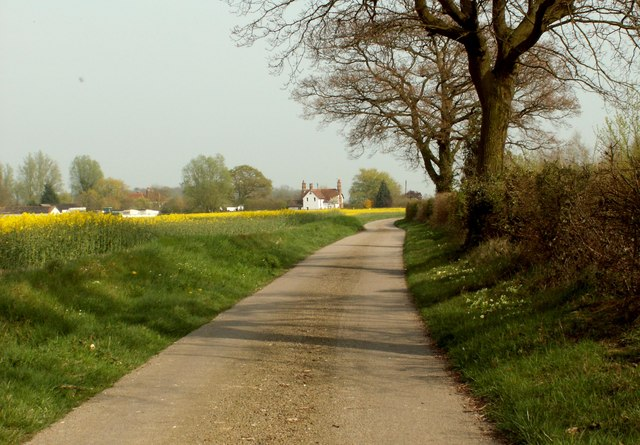
Sugar Lane, Almshouse Green

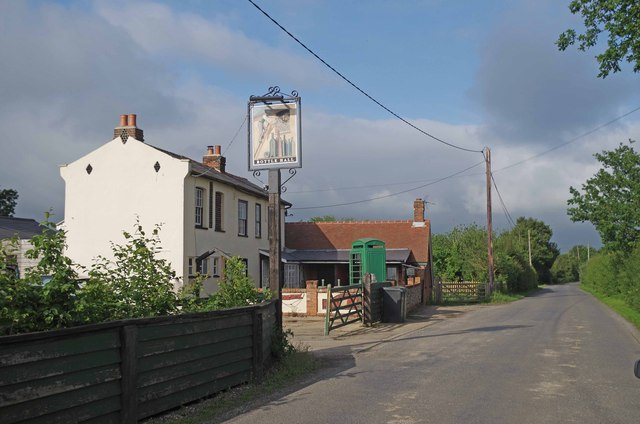
Bottle Hall Devlin End

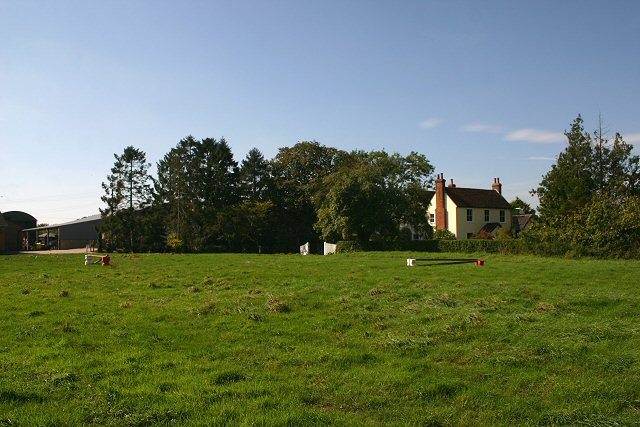
Pepper's Farm, Forrey Green

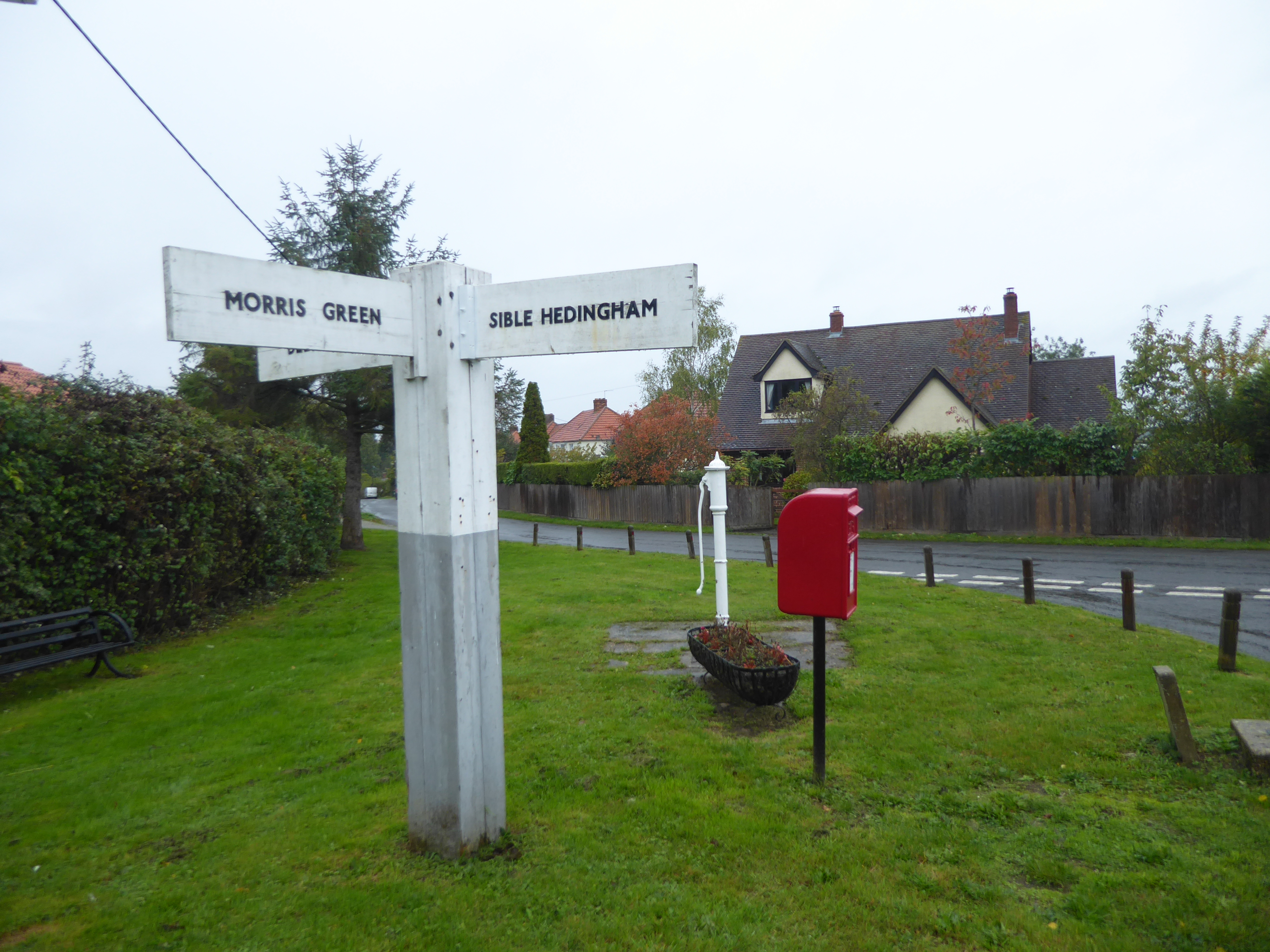
On the green at High Street Green, near Sible Hedingham, Essex

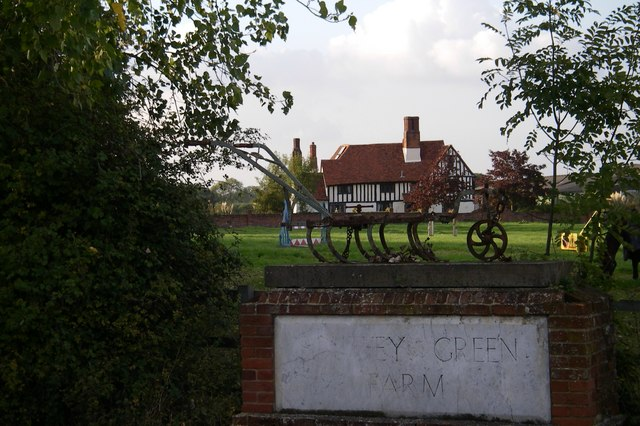
Southey Green Farm

Within the parish of Sible Hedingham there are numerous hamlets:

- Almshouse Green is a hamlet with the co-ordinates of 51.970°N 0.555°E, located between the village of Sible Hedingham and Wethersfield.
- Cobbs Fenn is a hamlet with the co-ordinates of 51.96°N 0.57°E, south of the village of Sible Hedingham.
- Cut Maple is a hamlet with co-ordinates of 51.955° N, 0.5958° E, south of the village of Sible Hedingham.
- Delvin End is a hamlet with the co-ordinates of 51.989° N, 0.558° E, north west of the village of Sible Hedingham.
- Forrey Green is a hamlet with the co-ordinates of 51°57'46"N 0°34'3"E, south west of the village of Sible Hedingham.
- High Street Green is a hamlet with the co-ordinates of 51.982657°N 0.5691149°E, west of the village of Sible Hedingham.
- Morris Green, Essex is a hamlet with the co-ordinates of 51°58'19"N 0°32'24"E, north west of the village of Sible Hedingham.
- Southey Green is a hamlet with the co-ordinates of 51.960°N 0.581°E, south of the village of Sible Hedingham.

== Buildings and structures ==
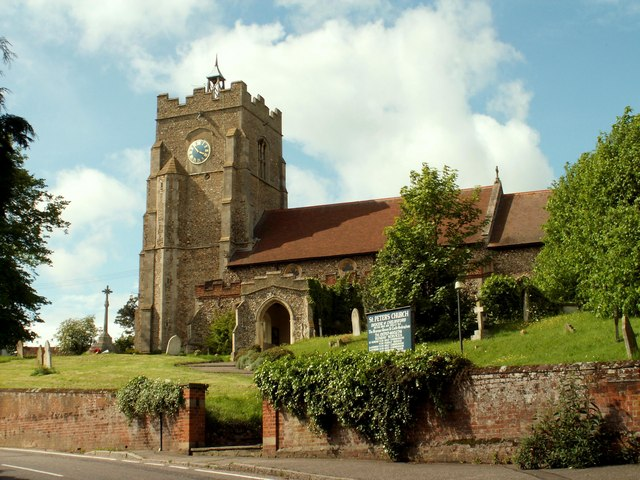
St. Peter's church

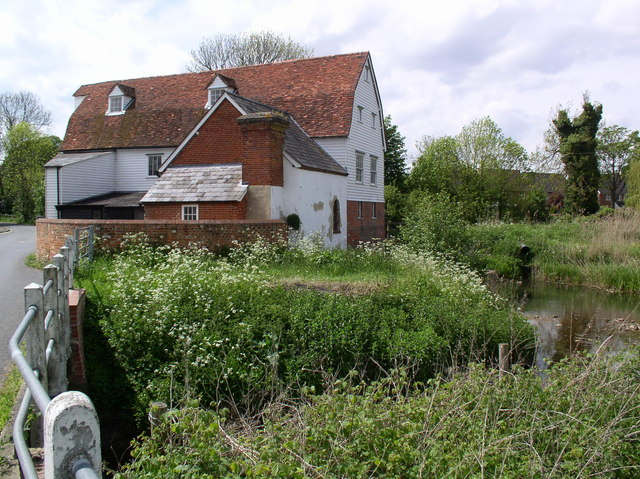
Alderford Water Mill

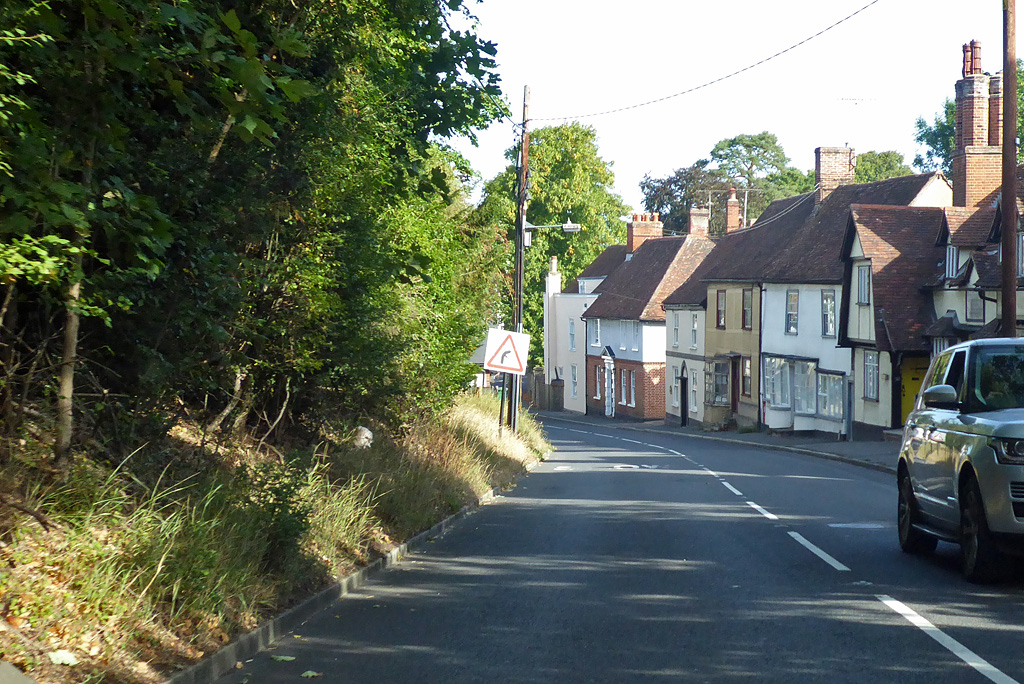
Potter Street, part of the A1017

Sible Hedingham parish has a number of buildings and structures that are listed on the National Heritage List for England. In addition, Braintree District Council have designated two parts of the village as conservation areas, one covering Queen Street, Potter Street, part of Swan Street, and Alderford Street, while the other covers Rectory Road and Church Street.

St. Peter's church is Grade II* listed and dates between 1330-1340 according to Nikolaus Pevsner. The tower is later, from the 16th century. Within the church is a memorial for Sir John Hawkwood. Alderford Mill is Grade II listed breast-shot watermill. The existing mill building dates from the 18th century, though maps from 1597 show a mill on the site. The mill initially milled corn on two millstone powered by water, but further steam-powered stones were added, which were initially converted to oil-powered before becoming electrically driven. During World War II, the mill started producing animal feed until it closed in 1956. The mill was purchased by Essex County Council in 1994, and along with the Friends of Alderford Mill, the mill was restored.

== Notable people ==
- J. Redwood Anderson (1883–1964), poet died here.
- Rachel Barrett (1874–1953), suffragette and newspaper editor.
- Clive Carey (1883-1968), English baritone, singing teacher, composer, opera producer and folk song collector.
- Savitri Devi (1905–1982), prominent proponent of Nazism, animal rights and deep ecology, who died here.
- 'Dummy', an unnamed elderly deaf mute man murdered by a mob in 1863 after he was accused of witchcraft.
- Sir John Hawkwood (1320–1394), English mercenary (or Condottiero) who was active in 14th-century Italy, reportedly born in Sible Hedingham.
- John Hilton (1805–1878), Surgeon Extraordinary to Queen Victoria and greatest anatomist of his time.
- Joan Prentice, a woman living in an almshouse here who was accused of witchcraft and she was hanged in Chelmsford in 1589.
- Professor John Stollery, (1930–2013) British engineer and academic.
- Samuel Wilbore (1595–1656) – a founder of Portsmouth Colony (Rhode Island, US; 7 March 1638) as a religious dissenter from the Plymouth Colony of Boston, Massachusetts.
