= Forest Hall School =

Location
- Forest Hall Road; Stansted Mountfitchet, Essex, CM24 8TZ; England
- Coordinates: 51.8938°N 0.2066°E

Information
- Type: Academy
- Motto: 'working together to inspire, support & achieve"
- Religious affiliation: Multi-cultural
- Established: 1956 as St. Marys High School; 2013 as Forest Hall School
- Local authority: Essex
- Department for Education URN: 141328 Tables
- Ofsted: Reports
- Head teacher: Dustin Schuyler
- Gender: Coeducational
- Age: 11 to 16
- Capacity: ~500
- Houses: Eagle, Falcon, Harrier, Merlin
- Colours: Green, Blue, Red, yellow
- Website: http://www.foresthallschool.org

Forest Hall School is a coeducational secondary school located in Stansted Mountfitchet, Essex, England.

In 2016 64% of students gained at least 5 GCSEs at A*-C including Maths and English. This figure had increased since 2013, when 28% of students achieved at least 5 GCSE grades A*-C including English and Maths. 67% of students also achieved A*-C grades on both English and Mathematics.

The school was originally called St. Mary's High School, opening in 1956, with roughly 300 students from the local area., the school changed to Mountfitchet High School in 1993, before being renamed again to Mountfitchet Maths and Computing College. The school was re-branded as Forest Hall School in September 2013, named after the road it is situated and the new housing estate built directly adjacent to the school. The school converted to academy status in February 2015 and is now sponsored by Burnt Mill Academy Trust (BMAT).

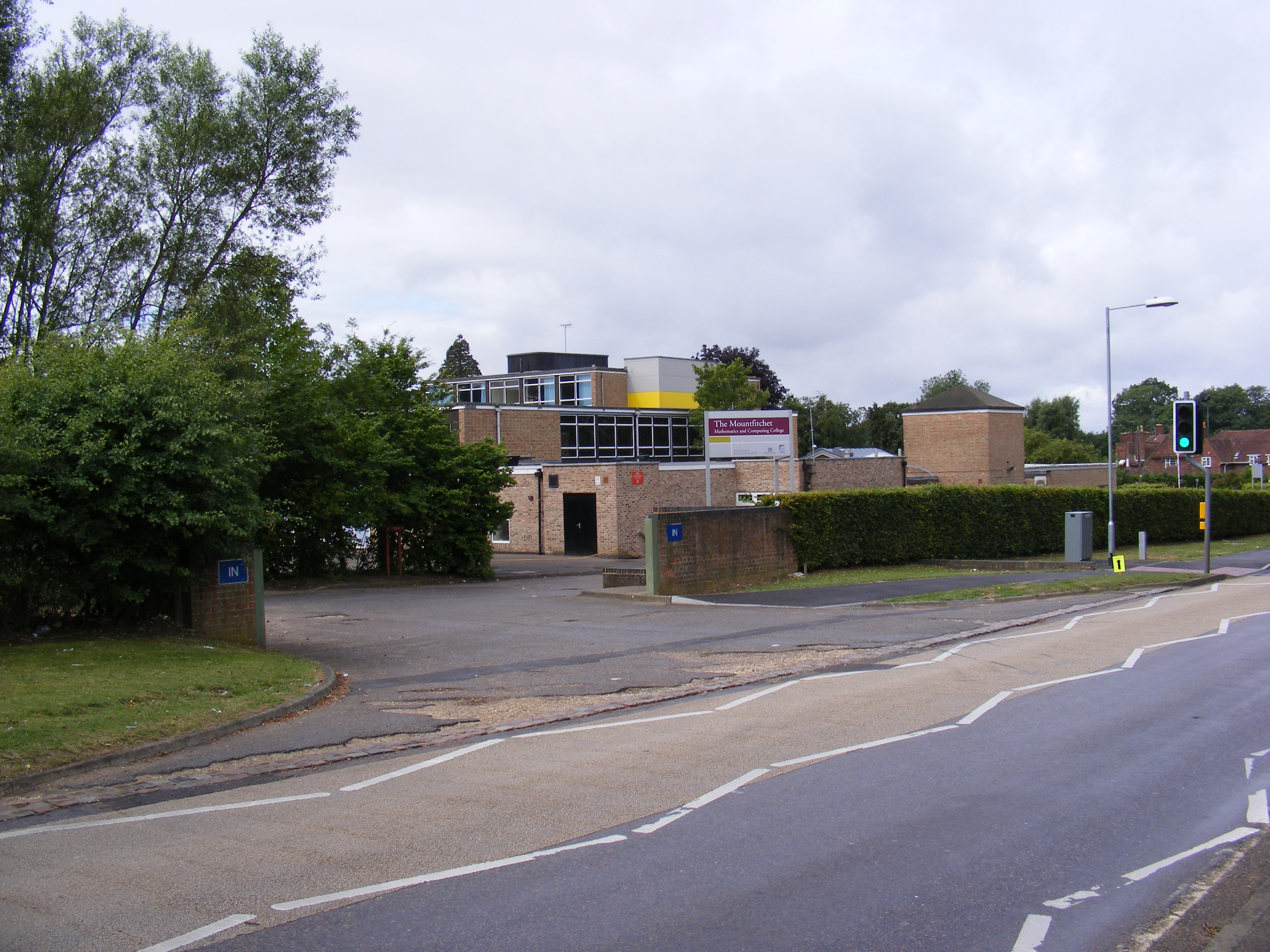
Mountfitchet Maths and Computing College, 2009
