= Lift Schools =

UK charitable trust

- Formation: 2008
- Type: Multi Academy Trust
- Key people: Rebecca Boomer-Clark (CEO)
- Website: https://www.liftschools.org/

Lift Schools, formerly Academies Enterprise Trust, is a multi-academy trust with over 60 primary, secondary and special schools in England. One of the largest networks of schools in the country, it is a non-profit, educational trust, which sponsors schools with academy status.

== Description ==
The trust's 59 schools are split into five geographic regions across England. Together, Lift Schools educate over 34,000 children and employ over 4500 staff.

Lift Schools' Chief Executive Officer (CEO) is Rebecca Boomer-Clark, who took up the position in April 2021 with the intention of pushing the trust ‘from turnaround into high performance’. Previously, Boomer-Clark had served as national director of secondary education at Ark Schools and Regional Schools Commissioner for South-West England.

Since 2022, Lift Schools has offered Initial Teacher Training for Qualified Teacher Status, delivered in partnership with Ark Teacher Training.

In September 2022, the trust launched Project H, an insights series using data and expertise from its schools to drive improvement across the education sector. By narrating its improvement journey, the platform's stated intention is to 'share insights, resources and reflections about what it takes to embed school improvement at scale.'

== History ==
Lift Schools changed its name from Academies Enterprise Trust in September 2024. AET was formally established in 2008 by the Greensward Charitable Trust (established in 1996 to support Greensward School) with its first school being Greensward Academy, in Hockley, Essex. The trust began growing in 2008, with three schools in Hockley. At its largest the chain numbered 76 schools. By 2015, AET had contracted to 68 schools.

Hockley Primary School joined the trust in September 2018. As of 2023, AET has 57 schools and has been given the green light by the Department for Education to take on further primary and SEN schools.

In 2026, two schools in the South West of England joined Lift Schools, Lift Beacon High and Lift East Wichel, the latter of which was named best UK primary school of the year by Tes in 2025.

Number of Academies by year
Year	Academies
2008	3
2009	4
2010	11
2011	30
2012	76
2013	77
2014	76
2015	68
2016	67
2017	66
2018	62
2019	58
2020	58
2021	57
2022	57
2023	57
2024	57
2025	57
2026	59

Between 2011 and 2012 AET more than doubled in size, leading to criticism that the academy chain was growing too fast and was therefore unable to ensure appropriate standards in its schools.

The first chief executive officer (CEO) of AET was David Triggs, who held the post from 2008 until September 2013. The second CEO was Ian Comfort, who had been Group Secretary and General Counsel since 2009. In 2016, the new Board of Trustees appointed Julian Drinkall as the new CEO, with Mr Drinkall taking up the post from December 2016.

In May 2019, AET faced a threatened vote of no confidence from staff with concerns being raised over workload, pay progression and the salary of Executives. Ultimately, the unions called off the vote of no confidence.

Summer 2019 also saw the organisation celebrating Naveed Idrees, Headteacher of Feversham Primary School, being awarded Headteacher of the Year in the TES annual teaching awards.

In October 2019, Julian Drinkall accused parent-governors of being "playground bully parents", and the trust removed parents from its governing bodies, despite criticism from the National Governance Association.

In 2020, Sir David Carter, former commissioner for schools in England, called AET ‘one of the best examples of a turnaround trust in the country’. Carter described how: 'Today, AET is no longer the uncontrollable enfant terrible of the academies sector, but has become a net-giver to the sector and, over the coming years, will become an organisation of which we can all be proud.'

In 2022, parents were put back on the governing bodies of schools as part of the trust's governance model of Academy Councils to replace local governing bodies (LGBs). Each Academy Council is made up of 'two elected parents, up to two employees, a local authority representative and up to three more appointed community members, such as local employers, charities, faith and culture leaders, staff from feeder schools or FE providers'.

== Controversies ==
=== Academic standards ===
Prior to 2017, AET struggled with academic results. Since 2017, results improved for the summer 2017 Key Stage 2 results, and in summer 2019 in Key Stage 2, 4 and 5. In some cases results were slightly higher than the national average.

Historically, OFSTED had criticised standards across AET in reports in both 2014 and 2015, as well as criticising standards in a number of individual schools. In 2014, half the schools in AET were reported as failing as OFSTED criticised 'low expectations. AET responded in 2014 to OFSTED's concerns about its standards being too low by saying that OFSTED had an unfairly negative slant against AET in their report and that "exam results in AET schools were improving faster than average".

In 2015 Sir Michael Wilshaw, the head of OFSTED wrote to the Secretary of State in England complaining about standards in the largest multi-academy trusts, including AET.

In its submission to the Parliamentary Select Committee on Multi Academy Trusts, AET stated that it would prefer a peer review model of monitoring, thus eradicating the need for OFSTED inspections of its academies.

In 2016 The DfE published comparative data looking at how the Multi Academy Trusts were performing and stated that AET students were doing less well than other pupils in comparable non AET schools at KS4, but were amongst the highest performers at KS2.

During the academic year of 2022/2023 AET schools reported improved outcomes across headline measures including phonics, reading and GCSE results. In primary schools across the trust, 86% of Key Stage 1 pupils passed phonics tests and 70% of pupils met the expected standard in reading, writing and maths combined, demonstrating a 'six percentage point increase from the previous year’ and a 11 percentage points ahead of the national average of 59%.

Improvements extended to KS4 results, where the trust reported 60% of pupils achieving grade 4+ (standard pass) in both English and maths GCSE. In KS5, 64% of students achieved grades A*-C, bucking the trend for an average drop in outcomes across the country in 2023 and performing 4 percentage points higher than the trust did in 2019.

=== Expansion ===
When AET was criticised for expanding too fast and not ensuring high enough academic standards, there was controversy over whether AET was 'barred' or 'banned' from expanding; or whether AET itself had chosen not to expand. Mike Barnett, on behalf of AET said that

the trust had agreed with the DfE that following a period of rapid expansion, it would “pause and consolidate our operations”... We currently have 68 schools and will expect this number to grow with DfE approval to 80 by the end of the school year. We have not been ‘barred’ from expanding.

Despite its insistent claim that it had 'not been barred from expanding', the number of AET schools then fell to 68 and a report for the Parliamentary Select Committee on Education explicitly contradicted AET's claim, stating that AET "has been barred from taking on more schools because of concerns that its rapid expansion was adversely affecting standards." Education Minister Edward Timpson said that "At 27 February 2014, 14 sponsors were restricted in full from sponsoring new academies or free schools out of a total of over 350 approved sponsors that currently support academies." Responding to queries about bans which prevent Multi-Academy Trusts from expanding, a spokesman for the Department for Education said

When we do have concerns about the performance of academy sponsors, we act quickly – we stop them from taking on new projects, so that they focus on their existing schools, and ensure pupils there get a good education. When they have demonstrated this, they are able to take on new academies.

At the same time, the then shadow Education minister Steve McCabe MP commented "...If they are not good enough to take on any new schools why are they good enough to run existing schools...?"

Under the leadership of Julian Drinkall, DfE Ministers gave AET the green light to grow again. In September 2018, Hockley Primary School (an Oftsed rated 'Outstanding' primary school in Essex) joined AET, and the trust was permitted to enter into discussions for further primary schools and SEN schools to join the organisation.

=== Financial management and controversies ===
As well as educational performance, AET's financial health has also been transformed since 2017. Having posted many years of multi-million pound deficits, January 2020 saw AET announce a second year of surpluses in the publication of year-end annual accounts.

Historically, the position had been less positive, with AET's income falling considerably between 2013 and 2014.

Year	Income	Expenditure	Surplus or Deficit
2013	£523,985,000	£266,208,000	£257,777,000
2014	£314,067,000	£333,118,000	-£19,051,000

The 40% drop in funding between 2013 and 2014 was reported as due to large transfers of extra funding from Local Authorities to help it take on Academies which needed improvements. Following the worsening financial situation and a range of additional concerns about AET's finances, AET was given a Financial Notice to improve on 23 October 2014. The Notice to Improve letter stated

The Education Funding Agency (EFA) has decided to issue a Financial Notice to Improve (the ‘Notice’) as a consequence of concerns about the financial management and governance of the Trust including the oversight of financial management by the Accounting Officer and the Directors...we have significant concerns about the volatility shown in the series of financial projections provided to us and the ability of the trust to forecast and therefore, critically, to secure finances across the group

At that time that the Educational Funding Agency (EFA) queried AET's competence with financial planning, it had only used its powers to issue a Financial Warning on eight occasions. In a later submission to a Parliamentary Select Committee, Ian Comfort, the CEO of AET queried the ability of the Education Funding Agency to continue working as it does, unless something changed. The DfE (and Dame Rachel de Souza, CEO of the Inspiration Trust) robustly rejected his criticisms, saying that the EFA systems were efficient and suitable.

As of 17 December 2015, 27 Financial Notices to Improve had been served upon Multi Academy Trusts, only 16 of which were still open as 11 of the organisations initially queried had improved and had their Notice to Improve removed. In its 2014 Annual Report, AET stated that the trust expected the EFA Notice to Improve to be lifted by March 2015. However the Financial Warning Notice remained in place in Autumn 2015. In the September 2015 AET Board meeting, the CEO Ian Comfort was cited explaining the situation by saying that he had not even been aware of the crucial deadline for reporting to the Education Funding Agency, and that was why the paperwork was not submitted that would have enabled the Financial Notice to Improve, to be lifted. The Notice to Improve was still in place at the end of August 2016.

The Financial Notice to Improve was lifted in summer 2017, following the radical Turnaround Plan developed and implemented by the current CEO, Julian Drinkall. The removal of the FNTI also meant that AET was able to engage in discussions about new academies joining the trust where it made sense to do so.

In terms of the difficulties AET had in managing its finances, it has identified PFI contracts as a key issue which made it difficult to manage its finances.

Financial concerns were raised in the media about the fact that AET paid almost £500,000 to private businesses owned by its trustees and executives. Ian Comfort, who as CEO was reported as earning £220,000 per annum, was reported to receive £329,000 in addition to his salary for "project management services". Commenting on these 'related party payments' Russell Hobby, the General Secretary of the NAHT said: "it is time for them to stop... It risks eroding the high trust in which the teaching profession is held because it shields decisions and payments from proper scrutiny."

AET salaries have also been a matter of controversy. In 2013 the press reported that the number of staff paid six-figure salaries in AET had risen almost fivefold in a two-year period. Despite overall numbers of staffing dropping in 2014, the numbers of staff paid at the highest levels went up: in 2013 there were 22 staff recorded with salaries between £100,000 and £229,000. In 2014 there were 26 staff paid in the same range. Jon Richards, the Education officer of the union UNISON said "The explosion in senior pay across many academy trusts over the past few years is completely disproportionate... In the same period, school support staff have endured year upon year of pay freezes and real-term pay cuts." In a review of CEO pay in 2015 it was also noted publicly that Ian Comfort, the CEO of AET is responsible for 67 schools and was paid £220,000 while the CEO of Plymouth Cast Multi Academy Trust was paid £53,000 and is responsible for 35 schools. By 2016 it was noted that Ian Comfort was earning £225,000, a 2% increase on the previous year. At the same time, classroom teachers were limited to pay rises of just 1%.

In recognition of the challenging financial environment, the CEO, Julian Drinkall, waived a salary increase for 2018 and 2019.

At its largest in 2014, AET was employing 6149 staff, of which less than half (2784) were teachers. This has led to questioning of its funding priorities, especially given the OFSTED criticisms of its standards. Further concerns have been raised about spending priorities with criticisms of what has been reported as AET's culture of "lavish expense claims."

In 2014 AET announced a plan for a joint venture with a commercial partner (reported as Price Waterhouse Coopers) which would have seen up to £400m of support services outsourced. Although unable to go ahead with the full joint venture, in 2015 AET put out to tender some aspects of the central services which would have fallen within its scope.

== Primary schools ==
- Lift Anglesey, Burton-upon-Trent
- Lift Ashingdon, Essex
- Lift Barton Hill, Torquay
- Lift Beacon, Loughborough
- Lift Brockworth, Gloucestershire
- Lift Caldicotes, Middlesbrough
- Lift Charles Warren, Milton Keynes
- Lift Cottingley, Leeds
- Lift East Wichel, Swindon
- Lift Feversham, Bradford
- Lift Four Dwellings, Birmingham
- Lift Green Way, Kingston upon Hull
- Lift Hall Road, Kingston upon Hull
- Lift Hamford, Walton-on-the-Naze
- Lift Hazelwood, Swindon
- Lift Hockley, Hockley
- Lift Lea Forest, Birmingham
- Lift Meadstead, South Yorkshire
- Lift Montgomery, Birmingham
- Lift Newington, Kingston upon Hull
- Lift Noel Park, North London
- Lift North Ormesby, Middlesbrough
- Lift North Thoresby, North Thoresby
- Lift Offa's Mead, Gloucestershire
- Lift Percy Shurmer, Birmingham
- Lift Plumberow, Essex
- Lift Shafton, Barnsley
- Lift St James the Great, Kent
- Lift St Helen's, Barnsley
- Lift Trinity, Wood Green
- Lift Utterby, Utterby
- Lift Westerings, Essex

== Secondary schools ==
- Lift Aylward, Edmonton
- Lift Beacon High, London
- Lift Bexleyheath, Greater London
- Lift Broadlands, Bristol
- Lift Clacton, Clacton-on-sea
- Lift Firth Park, Sheffield
- Lift Four Dwellings, Birmingham
- Lift Greensward, Essex
- Lift Greenwood, Birmingham
- Lift Kingsley, London
- Lift Kingswood, Kingston upon Hull
- Lift Maltings, Essex
- Lift New Forest, Hampshire
- Lift New Rickstones, Essex
- Lift Richmond Park, London
- Lift Ryde, Isle of Wight
- Lift Sir Herbert Leon, Milton Keynes
- Lift Tamworth, Staffordshire
- Lift Tendring, Essex
- Lift Rawlett, Staffordshire
- Lift Unity City, Middlesbrough
- Lift Winton, Hampshire

== Special schools ==
- Lift Columbus, Essex
- Lift Newlands, London
- Lift Pioneer, Essex
- Lift Crescent View, Cheltenham
- Lift Wishmore, Surrey

== Former primary schools ==
- Greenfield Academy, Gloucestershire
- Molehill Copse Primary Academy, Kent
- Oaks Primary Academy, Kent
- Peak Academy, Gloucestershire
- Weston Park, Isle of Wight
- Tree Tops Primary Academy, Kent
- Weston Academy, Totland
- Langer Primary Academy, Felixstowe
- Severn View Primary Academy, Stroud

== Former secondary schools ==
- Childwall Sports and Science Academy Liverpool
- East Point Academy Suffolk
- Eston Park Academy Middlesbrough
- Gillbrook Academy North Yorkshire
- Tendring Enterprise Studio School Clacton-on-sea
- The Duston School Northamptonshire
- Swallow Hill Academy Leeds
- Millbrook Academy Gloucestershire
- Everest Academy Hampshire
- Cordeaux Academy Lincolnshire
- Sandown Bay Academy Isle of Wight

== Governance and trustees ==
An article in The Guardian looking into diversity and equal opportunities amongst Academy chains found that AET's board listed eight trustees in spring 2016, all of whom were white and male. When challenged about how this fitted with the trusts' claims to promote diversity, AET accepted that improvement was needed and stated "We are taking steps to increase the diversity of our board of trustees. We hope to make an announcement about new appointments in the near future."

As of May 2020 the composition of the board has changed, with three of the trustees being women. As of June 2023, 5 of AET's 11 trustees are women, and the trust has a female CEO.

In December 2015, The Times Educational Supplement noted that the DfE had intervened with AET and had its own representatives attending AET board meetings. It stated that "It has emerged that the situation at the Academies Enterprise Trust (AET), which runs 68 schools throughout the country, has become so serious that representatives from the Department for Education now sit in on the trust’s board meetings. The government has said that it makes such a move if it has “concerns” about an academy chain."
