= Epping St John's School =

Location
- Bury Lane; Epping, Essex, CM16 5JB; England
- Coordinates: 51.6987°N 0.09852°E

Information
- Type: Academy
- Motto: Aspirational Courageous Exceptional (ACE)
- Religious affiliation: Church of England
- Established: September 2013
- Local authority: Essex
- Department for Education URN: 145050 Tables
- Ofsted: Reports
- Head of school: Michael Yerosimou
- Gender: Coeducational
- Age: 11 to 19
- Website: www.eppingstjohnsschool.org

Epping St John's School, formerly known as St John's Church of England Voluntary Controlled School, is an Anglican school in Epping, Essex.

The newly renamed Epping St. John's was established in September 2013. The school is mixed-sex or coeducational. The previous St Johns C of E secondary school building was located in Tower Road, Epping.

== Notable alumni ==
- Lily-Rose Aslandogdu
- Garth Jennings
