= St John's School, Billericay =

St John's School

Location
- Stock Road; Billericay, Essex, CM12 0AR; England
- Coordinates: 51.633153°N 0.423096°E

Information
- Type: Independent
- Motto: Sapere Est Vincere (Knowledge is Victory)
- Established: 1928
- Local authority: Essex
- Head teacher: Andrew Angeli
- Gender: Mixed
- Age: 3 to 16
- Enrolment: 434
- Website: http://www.stjohnsschool.net/

St John's School is an independent school in Billericay, Essex for students aged 3–16. The school is split into Kindergarten, Junior and Senior School.

== Notable alumni ==
- Ashley Banjo
- Jordan Banjo
- Jonny Mitchell Love Island (2015 TV series, series 3)
- Theo Stevenson
- Joan Sims (actress)
