= Hooe, East Sussex =

Village in East Sussex, England

Coordinates: 50.87°N 0.40°E

Hooe
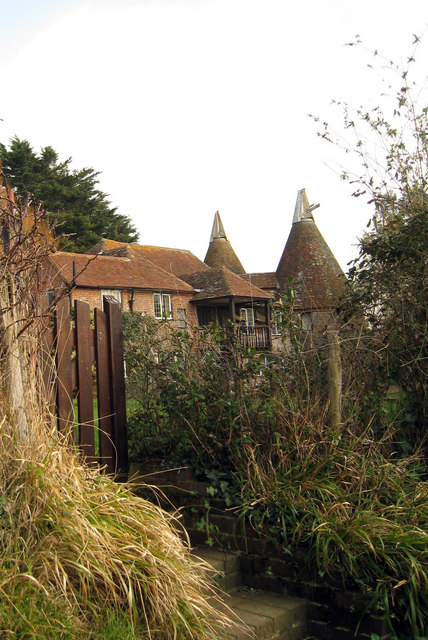
- The Oast House, Kiln Lane, Hooe

- Location within East Sussex
- Area: 10.0 km^{2} (3.9 sq mi)
- Population: 435 (Parish-2021)
  - Density: 44/km^{2} (110/sq mi)
- OS grid reference: TQ692106
  - London: 50 miles (80 km) NNW
- District: Wealden
- Shire county: East Sussex
- Region: South East
- Country: England
- Sovereign state: United Kingdom
- Post town: BATTLE
- Postcode district: TN33
- Dialling code: 01424
- Police: Sussex
- Fire: East Sussex
- Ambulance: South East Coast
- UK Parliament: Bexhill and Battle

Hooe is both a small village and a civil parish in the Wealden District of East Sussex; the village being located about two miles (3 km) north-west of Bexhill, and north of the A259 coast road, on the B2095 road from Ninfield. The parish name takes account of local usage, and the location of the parish church; in fact the main population centre is to the north, and is called Hooe Common.

== History ==
The name Hooe comes from the Saxon word meaning a ridge, since the village stood on a ridge of land between two arms of the sea. Those areas are now low-lying land, one being the Hooe Levels, across which flows the stream known as Waller's Haven. The River Ashbourne flows into the Haven, down which iron products, particularly cannon, used to be shipped from the Wealden iron works at Ashburnham.

During the 18th century Hooe was used by local gangs for the smuggling trade. There was a high demand in France for English wool and the local Romney sheep produced fine wool and high-quality meat which was traded or smuggled via small boats off Normans Bay for brandy, wines, tobacco and other luxury goods.

The church, dedicated to St Oswald, is part of a combined ecclesiastical parish with that at Ninfield. Hooe church, both Saxon and Norman, was built in its location as meeting point of several of the surrounding hamlets, including Hooe Common. There were suggestions by a local historian that there was a village surrounding the church but that it was burnt down during the plague and the village moved to Hooe Common although there is no archaeological evidence for this. There is an abandoned medieval village, Northeye, which is located on Hooe Levels. This may have been abandoned during the plague.

== Landmarks ==
Hooe windmill was situated where the house "The Retreat" is now, next to the recreation ground. King Henry the Eighths hunting lodge is located at Court Lodge where he stayed with Katherine Howard before they were married.

Pevensey Levels, a Site of Special Scientific Interest, lies partially in the parish. The site is of biological interest consisting of low-lying grazing meadows, hosting a wide variety of wetland flora and fauna.

The hardy and docile all-red\ginger Sussex cattle which arrived in Viking days are very well suited to the Hooe Levels where they were once used as oxen to transport goods locally; they thrive on the mineral rich marshland where they are grass-finished to produce some of the best beef in the world

== Demographics ==
In the 2022 census, Hooe recorded 183 households. The population of Hooe is skewed towards the elderly when compared to the UK national average

Age category	UK national average (2022)	Hooe (2022)
0-14 years	17.2 %	12.2 %
15- 64 years	64.0 %	56.3 %
65 and over	18.8 %	31.5%

== Public transport ==
Renown Coaches operate two buses services Monday to Friday which consists of:- Route 97: Currently Departs Hooe Lamb Inn at 09:03 and 12:03. There is a 15:03 on non school days which operates via Hooe Common 5 minutes later. (This is subject to change due to the national concessionary pass times changing.) These buses operate to Bexhill. There is also a School bus which departs Hooe Common at 08:08 to Claverham with a bus departing Claverham at 15:30. This is route 356.
