= Zenzizenzizenzic =

Obsolete mathematical term representing the eighth power of a number

Zenzizenzizenzic is an obsolete form of mathematical notation representing the eighth power of a number (that is, the zenzizenzizenzic of $x$ is $x^8$), dating from a time when powers were written out in words rather than as superscript numbers. This term was suggested by Robert Recorde, a 16th-century Welsh physician, mathematician, and writer of popular mathematics textbooks, in his 1557 work The Whetstone of Witte (although his spelling was zenzizenzizenzike); he wrote that it "doeth represent the square of squares squaredly".

== History ==
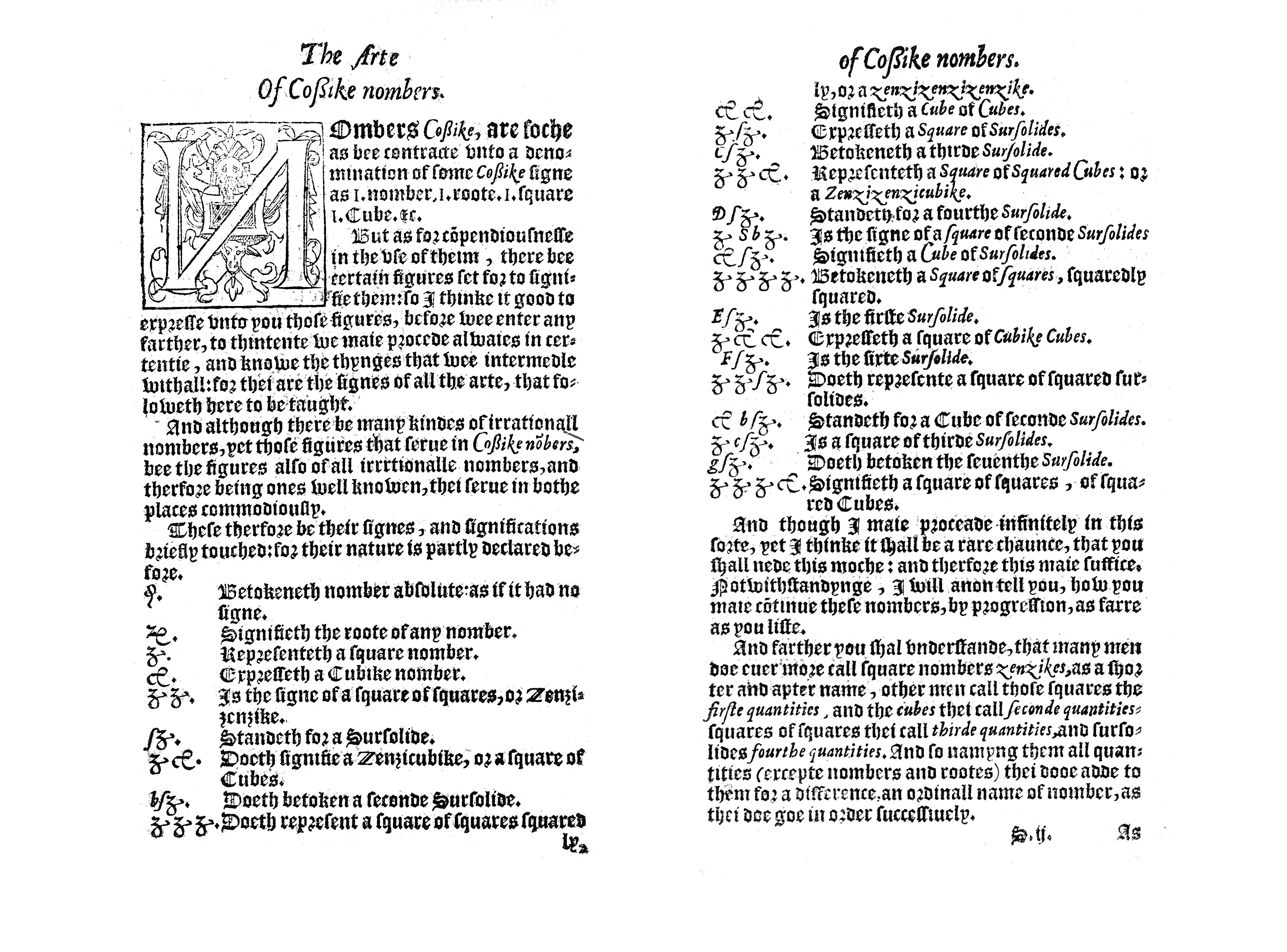
Page from The Whetstone of Witte, 1557. Zenzizenzizenzike occurs at the top of the right hand page.

At the time Recorde proposed this notation, there was no easy way of denoting the powers of numbers other than squares and cubes. The root word for Recorde's notation is zenzic, which is a German spelling of the medieval Italian word censo, meaning 'squared'. Since the square of a square of a number is its fourth power, Recorde used the word zenzizenzic (spelled by him as zenzizenzike) to express it. Some of the terms had prior use in Latin zenzicubicus, zensizensicus and zensizenzum. Similarly, as the sixth power of a number is equal to the square of its cube, Recorde used the word zenzicubike to express it; a more modern spelling, zenzicube, is found in Samuel Jeake's Arithmetick Surveighed and Reviewed. Finally, the word zenzizenzizenzic denotes the square of the square of a number's square, which is its eighth power: in modern notation,

$$x^8=\left(\left(x^2\right)^2\right)^2.$$

Samuel Jeake gives zenzizenzizenzizenzike (the square of the square of the square of the square, or 16th power) in a table in A Compleat Body of Arithmetick (1701):

Indices	Characters	Signification of the characters
0	N	An absolute number, as if it had no mark
...	...	...
16	ℨℨℨℨ	A Zenzizenzizenzizenzike or square of squares squaredly squared
...	...	...

The word, as well as the system, is obsolete except as a curiosity; the Oxford English Dictionary (OED) has only one citation for it. As well as being a mathematical oddity, it survives as a linguistic oddity: zenzizenzizenzic has more Zs than any other word in the OED.

== Notation for other powers ==
Recorde proposed three mathematical terms by which any power (that is, index or exponent) greater than 1 could be expressed: zenzic, i.e. squared; cubic; and sursolid, i.e. raised to a prime number greater than three, the smallest of which is five. Sursolids were as follows: 5 was the first; 7, the second; 11, the third; 13, the fourth; etc.

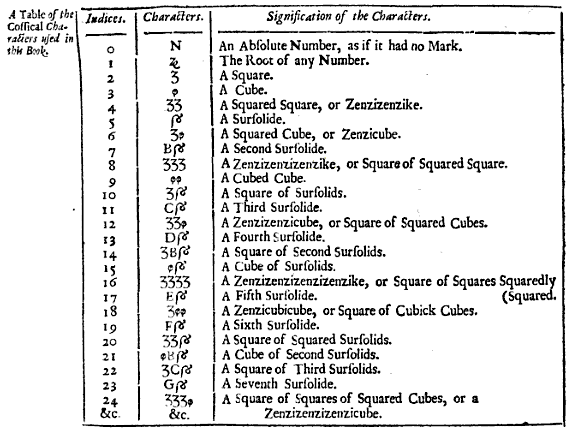
Table of powers, symbols and names or descriptions from 0 to 24 by Samuel Jeake, written in 1671

Therefore, a number raised to the power of six would be zenzicubic, a number raised to the power of seven would be the second sursolid, hence bissursolid (not a multiple of two and three), a number raised to the twelfth power would be the "zenzizenzicubic" and a number raised to the power of ten would be the square of the (first) sursolid. The fourteenth power was the square of the second sursolid, and the twenty-second was the square of the third sursolid.

Jeake's text appears to designate a written exponent of 0 as being equal to an "absolute number, as if it had no Mark", thus using the notation $x^0$ to refer to an independent term of a polynomial, while a written exponent of 1, in his text, denotes "the Root of any number" (using root with the meaning of the base number, i.e. its first power $x^1$, as demonstrated in the examples provided in the book).

== See also ==
- Prime factor exponent notation
