= Cinque Ports =

Historic group of English coastal towns

Coordinates: 51°4′N 1°5′E

Heraldic banner of the Cinque Ports

Location of the Cinque Ports and their limbs.

The confederation of Cinque Ports (/sɪŋk pɔːrts/ sink ports) is a historic group of coastal towns in south-east England – predominantly in Kent and Sussex, with one outlier (Brightlingsea) in Essex. The name is Old French, meaning "five harbours", and alludes to the original five members (Hastings, New Romney, Hythe, Dover and Sandwich). At its peak in the Late Middle Ages, the confederation included over 40 members. There is now a total of 14 members: five "head ports", two "ancient towns" and seven "limbs".

The confederation was originally formed for military and trade purposes, but is now entirely ceremonial. The ports lie on the western shore of the English Channel, where the crossing to the European continent is narrowest.

Inhabitants of the Cinque Ports are called Portsmen.

== Origins ==
The origins of the confederation are obscure, but are believed to lie in the late Anglo-Saxon period, and specifically in the reign of Edward the Confessor (1042–1066). Certain south-eastern ports were granted the local profits of justice in return for providing ships. The ship service of Romney, Dover and Sandwich (but not the confederation itself) is noted in Domesday Book (1086). By 1135, the term Cinque Ports had come into use; and in 1155 a royal charter established the ports to maintain ships ready for the Crown in case of need. The earliest general charter granting liberties to the ports in common dates from 1260. Their liberties are also mentioned in the Magna Carta of 1297 (clause 9). The chief obligation laid on the ports, as a corporate duty, was to provide 57 ships for 15 days' service to the king annually, each port fulfilling a proportion of the whole duty.

It is sometimes said that the rationale behind the granting of privileges, and their maintenance and extension over several centuries, was the need for the Crown to have a guaranteed supply of men and ships in time of war, and that the Cinque Ports therefore played an important role in the development of the Royal Navy. N. A. M. Rodger questions whether the arrangement was ever intended to raise any genuinely effective naval provision, and shows that the Cinque Ports did not contribute to English strength at sea significantly more than other English ports of similar size. He argues rather that the original privileges may have been granted by Edward the Confessor out of a need to purchase the loyalty of a group of potentially troublesome ports that were of strategic importance to the control of cross-Channel traffic. Notwithstanding this, in the 13th and 14th centuries the ports did play a significant role in the defence of the realm, although their importance declined thereafter.

== Membership ==
=== Head Ports ===
The original five ports were:

- Hastings
- New Romney
- Hythe
- Dover
- Sandwich

In medieval documents, Hastings sometimes appears to be given precedence among the ports (for example, the charters granted to Rye and Winchelsea by Henry II in 1155 refer to "The Barons of Hastings and the Cinque Ports"); but this usage probably arose simply from geographical convenience, with the ports being conventionally listed in order from west to east.

==== Ancient Towns ====
By 1190, two further towns had joined the confederation, originally to assist Hastings in her provision of ships. In time they grew in prosperity, and by the 14th century were recognised as having the same "head port" status as the original five ports. In deference to the literal meaning of "Cinque Ports", however, these two additional members were always distinguished under the title of the "Ancient Towns" (often spelled "Antient Towns"). The confederation is therefore sometimes referred to as "The five Cinque Ports and two Ancient Towns". The Ancient Towns were:

- Winchelsea
- Rye

=== Limbs ===
Over the years, a number of further towns and ports joined the confederation as detached "Limbs" or "Members" (the terms are used interchangeably) of the seven head ports: they took a share in the burden of ship service, and a share in the privileges of the confederation. The limbs were often distinguished as either "corporate limbs", whose status was confirmed by royal charter, and which enjoyed a considerable degree of self-government; or "non-corporate limbs", generally smaller settlements, which were more heavily dependent on, and governed by, their head port.

==== Corporate limbs ====
The corporate limbs were:

- Pevensey (limb of Hastings)
- Seaford (limb of Hastings)
- Tenterden (limb of Rye)
- Lydd (limb of New Romney)
- Folkestone (limb of Dover)
- Faversham (limb of Dover)
- Fordwich (limb of Sandwich)
- Deal (limb of Sandwich; originally a non-corporate limb, but incorporated in 1699)

==== Non-corporate limbs ====
Non-corporate limbs have at various dates included:

- Limbs of Hastings: Grange (now part of Gillingham, Kent), Bekesbourne, Bulverhythe, Northeye (former village in Sussex), Eastbourne, Hydney (now Hampden Park, part of Eastbourne), Pebsham (small village between Bulverhythe and Bexhill-on-Sea [then as Bexhill]), and Petit Iham (settlement near Winchelsea)
- Limbs of New Romney: Old Romney, Bromehill (near Winchelsea), Dengemarsh, and Orwaldstone
- Limb of Hythe: West Hythe
- Limbs of Dover: Margate, St Johns (part of Margate), Goresend (now Birchington), Birchington Wood (now Woodchurch), St Peters, Ringwould, and Kingsdown
- Limbs of Sandwich: Reculver, Sarre, Walmer, Stonar (near Richborough), Ramsgate, and Brightlingsea (in Essex)

==== Current limbs ====
Many of the historic members of the confederation have now either ceased to exist as a result of coastal change, or have shrunk or lost status for other reasons. The following are the current limbs of the confederation:

- Tenterden (limb of Rye)
- Lydd (limb of New Romney)
- Folkestone (limb of Dover)
- Faversham (limb of Dover)
- Margate (limb of Dover)
- Deal (limb of Sandwich)
- Ramsgate (limb of Sandwich)

== Privileges ==
In return for their ship service, the towns received various privileges, including:

- Exemption from tax and tallage
- Rights of sac and soc [jurisdiction over criminal and civil cases within their liberties]
- Rights of toll and team [authority over the sale or passage of cattle and other property within their liberties]
- Rights of bloodwit and fledwit [authority to punish shedders of blood, and those seized in an attempt to escape justice]
- Rights of pillory and tumbril [authority to punish delinquents]
- Rights of infangthief and outfangthief [authority to imprison or execute thieves or other felons]
- The right of mundbryce [the right to enter private property in order to erect banks or dikes as a defence against the sea]
- Rights of waifs and strays [the right to appropriate unclaimed property and stray animals]
- Rights of flotsam, jetsam and ligan [the right to appropriate the debris and cargo of wrecked ships]

This means that in effect they were granted a degree of self-government, legal jurisdiction, and financial advantage. In many respects, the confederation was considered to hold a status equivalent to that of a shire.

From an early date (the 13th century) representatives of the ports sat in Parliament. The practice had been regularised by the end of the 14th century, with the five head ports and two ancient towns, and one corporate limb (Seaford), each being entitled to send two Members to Parliament.

== Institutions ==
Many of the Portsmen were fishermen, and in pursuit of herring sailed annually to the Norfolk coast, where they claimed rights of "den and strand" on the sandbank at the mouth of the River Yare. The settlement there gradually developed into the town of Yarmouth. The ports therefore became closely involved in the regulation of the annual autumn Herring Fair at Yarmouth, and this was probably the main incentive for the individual ports to work together collectively in confederation.

A Lord Warden of the Cinque Ports was appointed, an office frequently, and by the end of the 13th century permanently, combined with that of Constable of Dover Castle. The joint office survives to the present day, but is now a purely honorary title, with an official residence at Walmer Castle.

The confederation had its own system of assemblies and common courts:

- The court of Shepway is first mentioned in the late 12th century. It was a local royal court of justice (effectively the equivalent of an eyre court), presided over by an officer of the Crown, and linked the confederation to central government. It met at Shepway Cross, near Lympne, where officers of the various members of the confederation were summoned to attend. The court met at irregular intervals, and over the course of the 15th century appears to have fallen into a slow decline. By the early 17th century it had effectively ceased to function. Nevertheless, it continued to hold a nominal existence, as it was at special sessions of the court that the Lord Warden was installed in office. The court of 1598, summoned for the installation as Warden of Henry Brooke, Lord Cobham, was held at his manor of Bekesbourne; and in the late 17th century the court was moved to Dover. The approximate site of the original meeting place is now marked by a war memorial erected in 1923, also known as Shepway Cross.
- The Brodhull was a general assembly for representatives of the five head ports and two ancient towns. "Brodhull" is thought to have been originally a place-name, and presumably the original place of meeting, close to Dymchurch. The assembly subsequently met in Dymchurch, but after 1357 came to meet regularly in New Romney. One of the principal tasks of the Brodhull was the supervision of the Yarmouth Fair, and the appointment of bailiffs to manage it. By 1432 it met regularly twice a year. Meetings followed a parliamentary pattern, and were presided over by a "Speaker": the speakership changed on 21 May each year, the right of appointment moving from port to port in geographical order from west to east. In the 15th and 16th centuries the name "Brodhull" gradually became corrupted (through false etymology) into "Brotherhood", and in the post-medieval period the court was more usually known as the Brotherhood.
- The Guestling appears to have originated as a local meeting of the west ports (Hastings, Winchelsea and Rye, and perhaps their limbs). It probably took its name from the village of Guestling, a few miles west of Winchelsea, which may have been its original meeting-place. Over the course of the 16th century it developed into a more general meeting of all the head ports, ancient towns and corporate limbs, usually held annually and often in conjunction with the Brotherhood. As it represented a larger group of ports than the Brotherhood, it eventually became the pre-eminent assembly. However, in 1663 the Yarmouth service was suspended indefinitely, and thereafter both the Brotherhood and the Guestling fell into decline. The two courts continue to hold a nominal existence, but since 1866 have been held jointly.

=== Barons ===
Common seal of the barons of Hythe, probably late 13th century

Common seal of the barons of Hastings, probably late 13th century. The ship flies two banners: one of the Cinque Ports at its bow (left), the other of the three lions of England at its stern.

All Freemen of the ports, termed "Portsmen", were deemed in the age of feudalism to be barons, and thus members of the baronage entitled to attend the king's parliament – a privilege granted in 1322 in recognition of their earlier support of the Despensers, father and son. Termed "Barons of the Cinque Ports", they reflected an early concept that military service at sea constituted land tenure per baroniam making them quasi feudal barons. The early-14th-century treatise Modus Tenendi Parliamentum stated the Barons of the Cinque Ports to hold a place of precedence below the lay magnates (Lords Temporal) but above the representatives of the shires and boroughs (Knights of the Shire and burgesses). During the deposition of Edward II, the chronicles made a specific point of noting the presence of the Barons in the embassy of deposition – "praecipue de portubus ... barones des Portez" ("especially the [Cinque] Ports ... the barones of the Ports"). Writs of summons to parliament were sent to the warden following which representative barons of the Cinque Ports were selected to attend parliament. Thus the warden's duty in this respect was similar to that of the sheriff who received the writs for distribution to the barons in the shires. The existence of common (i.e. communal) seals of the barons of the individual ports (see illustration) suggests they formed a corporation as the seal was designed to be affixed to charters and legal documents which would bind them as a single body. This no doubt related to their privileges as monopolies. The warden and barons often experienced clashes of jurisdiction.

In the 21st century the title "Baron of the Cinque Ports" is now reserved for Freemen elected by the Mayor, Jurats and Common Council of the Ports to attend a coronation and is solely honorary in nature. "Since time immemorial", the barons had held the right to hold a canopy above the monarch during the procession on foot between Westminster Hall and Westminster Abbey. This procession was discontinued after the Coronation of George IV in 1821, but for the Coronation of Edward VII in 1902 the barons were found a new role. They were to process inside the abbey as far as the choir and there receive the banners of the monarch's realms, a function which they have repeated at all the 20th-century coronations. For the Coronation of Charles III and Camilla in 2023, fourteen barons joined the congregation in the abbey, representing the original five ports, the two ancient towns and the seven limbs.

== Decline ==
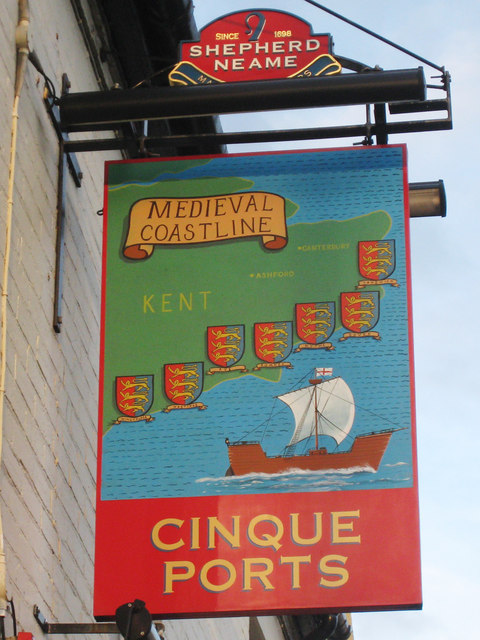
Pub sign in Rye

The continuing decline of the confederation of the Cinque Ports may be ascribed to a variety of different circumstances. While they survived the raids from the Danes and the French, the numerous destructive impact of plagues, and the politics of the 13th-century Plantagenets and the subsequent War of the Roses, natural causes such as the silting of harbours and the withdrawal of the sea did much to undermine them. The rise of Southampton, and the need for larger ships than could be crewed by the 21-man service of the ports, also contributed to the decline.

Although by the 14th century the confederation faced wider challenges from a greater consolidation of national identity in the monarchy and Parliament, the legacy of the Saxon authority remained. Even after the 15th century, the Ancient Towns continued to serve with the supply of transport ships.

During the 15th century, New Romney, once a port of great importance at the mouth of the river Rother (until it became completely blocked by the shifting of sands during the South England flood of February 1287), was considered the central port in the confederation, and the place of assembly for the courts of Shepway and Brodhull.

Much of Hastings was washed away by the sea in the 13th century. During a naval campaign of 1339, and again in 1377, the town was raided and burnt by the French, and went into a decline during which it ceased to be a major port. It had no natural sheltered harbour. Attempts were made to build a stone harbour during the reign of Elizabeth I, but the foundations were destroyed by the sea in storms.

New Romney is now about a mile and a half from the seafront. It was originally a harbour town at the mouth of the River Rother. The Rother estuary was always difficult to navigate, with many shallow channels and sandbanks. In the latter part of the thirteenth century a series of severe storms weakened the coastal defences of Romney Marsh, and the South England flood of February 1287 almost destroyed the town. The harbour and town were filled with sand, silt, mud and debris, and the River Rother changed course, now running out into the sea near Rye, Sussex. New Romney ceased to be a port.

Hythe is still on the coast. However, although it is beside a broad bay, its natural harbour has been removed by centuries of silting.

Dover is still a major port.

Sandwich is now 3 km (1.9 mi) from the sea and no longer a port.

Ongoing changes in the coastline along the south east coast, from the Thames estuary to Hastings and the Isle of Wight inevitably reduced the significance of a number of the Cinque port towns as port authorities. However, ship building and repair, fishing, piloting, off shore rescue and sometimes even "wrecking" continued to play a large part in the activities of the local community.

By the reign of Queen Elizabeth I, the Cinque Ports had effectively ceased to be of any great significance, and were absorbed into the general administration of the realm. Queen Elizabeth I sanctioned the first national lottery that was held in 1569 in an effort to raise funds for the crumbling Cinque Ports. Nevertheless, in 1689 the Cinque ports were among those specifically called following the Glorious Revolution to elect representatives to attend the Convention Parliament which enacted the English Bill of Rights.

With the advance in shipbuilding techniques came a growth in towns such as Bristol and Liverpool and the wider development of ports such as London, Gravesend, Southampton, Chichester, Plymouth and the royal dockyards of Chatham, Portsmouth, Greenwich, Woolwich and Deptford. A further reason for the decline of many older ports may be ascribed to the development of the canal, turnpike and railway networks across Britain, and the increased quantity of overseas trade these could distribute from the new major ports developing from the 18th century.

Local government reforms and Acts of Parliament passed during the 19th and 20th centuries (notably the Reform Act 1832) have eroded the administrative and judicial powers of the Confederation of the Cinque Ports, when New Romney and Winchelsea were disenfranchised from Parliament, with representation provided through their counties alone, while Hythe and Rye's representation was halved.

In 1985, HMS Illustrious established an affiliation with the Cinque Ports. In 2005, the affiliation was changed to HMS Kent.

== Records ==
The early history of the confederation is poorly documented, and can generally be traced only through incidental mentions in the charters granted to individual ports, or in other external records. One important early document, first compiled in the 13th century, but which survives only in the form of later and variant copies, is the so-called "Domesday of the Ports", a list of the then-members of the confederation and the services they owed.

The confederation's activities are much better documented from 1432 onwards, when minutes of the proceedings of the Brotherhood and Guestling began to be taken consistently. Meetings are documented in two books, known respectively as the "White Book" (covering the years 1432 to 1571, although the earliest portion, to 1485, comprises a transcript made in 1560) and the "Black Book" (covering the years 1572 to 1955). The White and Black Books were held at New Romney until 1960, when they were transferred to the Kent Archives Office (now the Kent History and Library Centre) in Maidstone. A comprehensive calendar of the two books was published in 1966.

== Heraldry ==
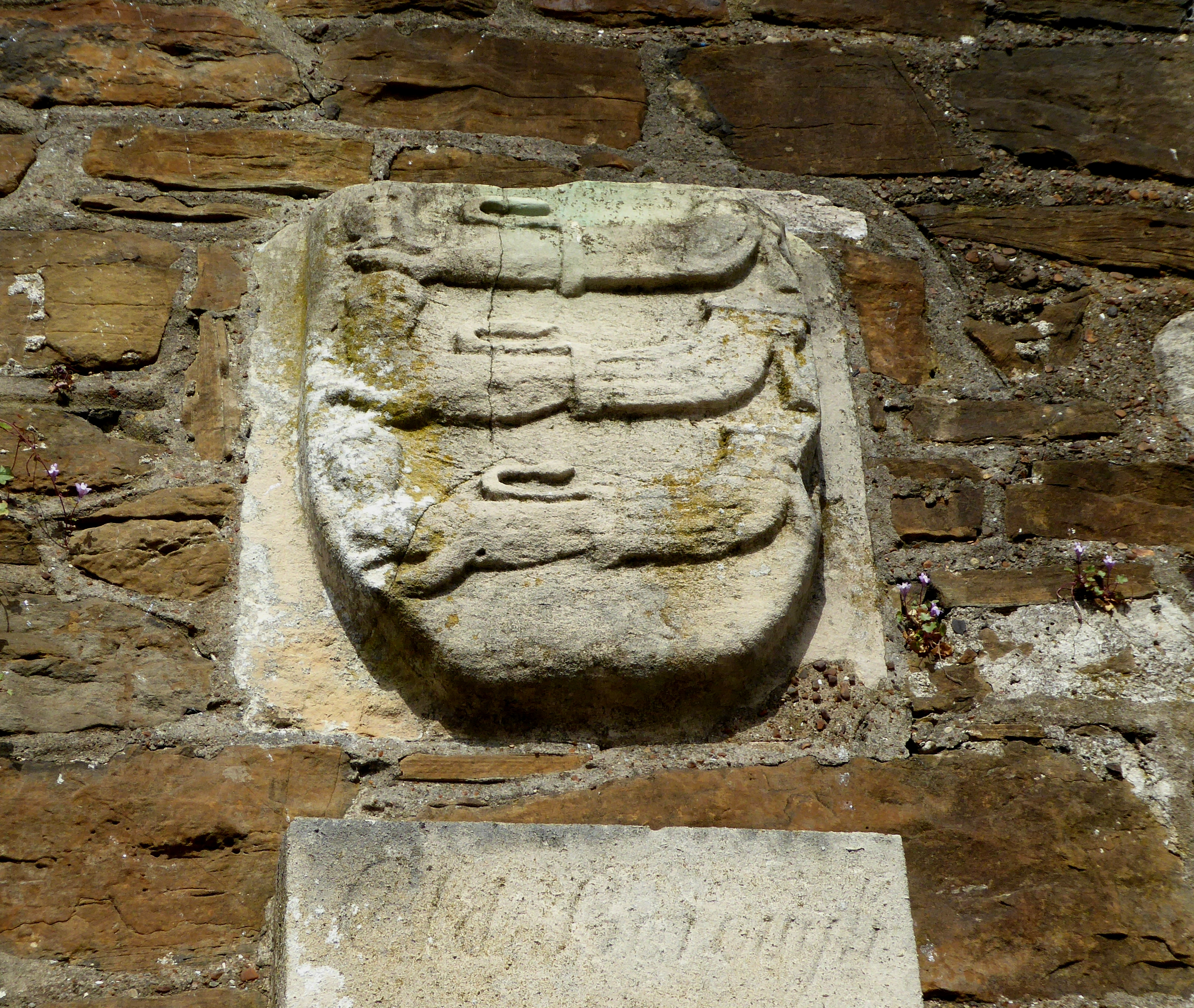
The Cinque Ports arms at Strand Gate, Rye

The traditional coat of arms of the confederation is a shield divided per pale (vertically), depicting on the dexter side (viewer's left) three gold half lions passant gardant on a red field; and on the sinister side (viewer's right) three gold half ships' hulls on a blue field. These arms are also flown as an heraldic banner (flag), and form the basis of the banner of the Lord Warden of the Cinque Ports. The earliest certain evidence for the use of the arms is on a common seal of Dover dating from 1305, but they also appear on the common seal of Hastings which may be a few years earlier. They are thought to have been first introduced in c.1297.

There has long been an assumption that the arms were created through a process of heraldic dimidiation – that is to say, by combining half of the royal arms of England (the three lions) with half of an unidentified coat of arms depicting three ships. However, none of the earliest representations of the arms (all on seals) show the vertical partition of the field, suggesting that it was originally of only one colour. It therefore appears more likely that, while certainly alluding to the royal arms, the arms of the Cinque Ports were devised from the outset as a design depicting three half-lion-half-ships, probably on a red field; and that only at a later date, probably in the mid-14th century, was the field partitioned into two colours.

There has historically been some confusion as to whether the three ships should be depicted as gold ("or") or silver ("argent"): both variants are found in reputable heraldic sources from the late middle ages to the 19th century. The modern consensus is to depict them as gold in the confederation arms, although silver ships appear in some of the derivative arms borne by individual member ports.

Community flag of the Cinque Ports, registered 2017

The traditional arms and banner may only officially and lawfully be displayed by representatives of the confederation itself, or by the local authorities for its member ports. However, in 2017 the Cinque Ports Authority registered with the UK Flag Registry a flag of three gold ships' hulls on a blue field as a "regional" or "community" flag, which may be flown by anyone who wishes to express identity with the Cinque Ports.

Several of the member ports have their own coats of arms, which in some cases are modified or derivative versions of the confederation arms. Thus, Sandwich bears arms identical to those of the confederation, but with the three ships' hulls silver. Hastings bears a variant on which the central half-lion-half-ship is replaced by a full lion, and the two ships' hulls are silver. Deal bears a version of the confederation arms differenced by a chief on which the Lord Warden's "oar of Admiralty" appears. New Romney bears three gold lions on a blue field. Others incorporate elements from the confederation arms, or otherwise allude to them. Great Yarmouth, Norfolk, never a member of the confederation but closely associated with it through its herring fishery and fair, bears a variant on which the three half-ships are replaced by three fishes' tails.

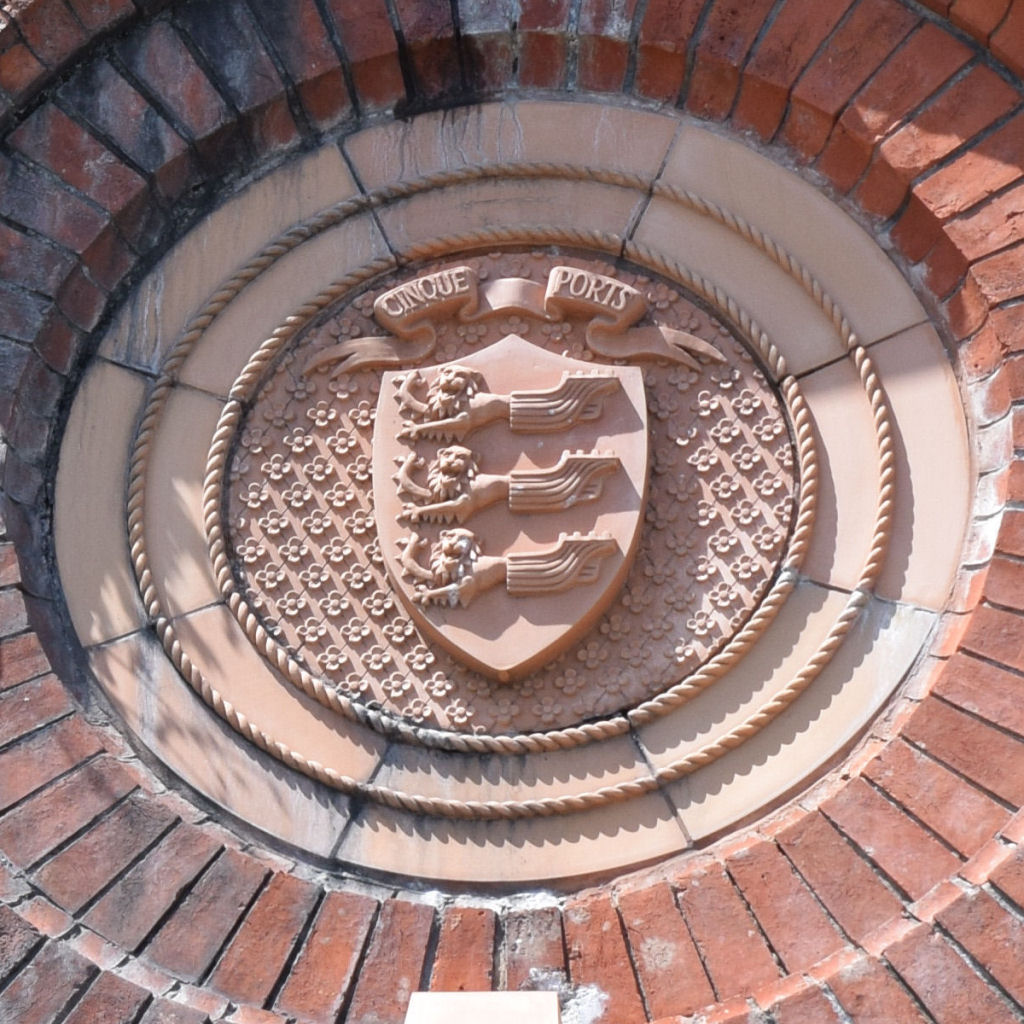
The Cinque Ports arms at Ramsgate Port

Banner of Admiral of the Fleet Lord Boyce, Lord Warden of the Cinque Ports (2005–2022)

Arms of Sandwich, recorded at the visitation of 1574

Arms of Hastings, recorded at the visitation of 1634

Arms of New Romney, recorded at the visitation of 1619

Arms of Kent County Council, granted 1933, including the Cinque Ports arms suspended from the collar of the sinister (right) supporter

Arms of Dover District Council, granted 1987

Arms of Great Yarmouth, Norfolk, first recorded mid-15th century

== Cinque Ports Acts 1811 to 1872 ==
Cinque Ports Act 1811 (Note: The citation of this act by this short title was authorised by section 1 of, and the first schedule to, the Short Titles Act 1896. Due to the repeal of those provisions it is now authorised by section 19(2) of the Interpretation Act 1978.)
- Act of Parliament
- Parliament of the United Kingdom
- Long title: An Act to facilitate the Execution of Justice within The Cinque Ports.
- Citation: 51 Geo. 3. c. 36
- Territorial extent: United Kingdom

Dates
- Royal assent: 25 May 1811
- Commencement: 25 May 1811 (Note: The Acts of Parliament (Commencement) Act 1793.)
- Repealed: 16 June 1977
Other legislation
| Amended by | Statute Law Revision Act 1888; Justices of the Peace Act 1949 |
| Repealed by | Statute Law (Repeals) Act 1977 |

Status: Repealed

Text of statute as originally enacted

The Cinque Ports Acts 1811 to 1872 is the collective title of the following acts:

- The Cinque Ports Act 1811 (51 Geo. 3. c. 36)
- The Cinque Ports Act 1821 (1 & 2 Geo. 4. c. 76)
- The Cinque Ports Act 1828 (9 Geo. 4. c. 37)
- The Pilotage Law Amendment Act 1853 (16 & 17 Vict. c. 129)
- The Cinque Ports Act 1855 (18 & 19 Vict. c. 48)
- The Cinque Ports Act 1857 (20 & 21 Vict. c. 1)
- The Cinque Ports Act 1869 (32 & 33 Vict. c. 53)
- The Merchant Shipping Act 1872 (35 & 36 Vict. c. 73 s 10)

== See also ==
- Haven ports
- Pentapolis
- Lord Warden of the Cinque Ports
- Channel Ports
- Hanseatic League, the confederation of coastal and other merchant cities in Central Europe

== Bibliography ==
- Brentnall, Margaret (1972). The Cinque Ports and Romney Marsh. London: John Gifford.
- Burrows, Montagu (1888). Cinque Ports. London: Longmans, Green, and Co.
- Chisholm, Hugh, ed. (1911). "Cinque Ports" . Encyclopædia Britannica. Vol. 6 (11th ed.). Cambridge University Press. pp. 377–378.
- Draper, Gillian (2021). "Urban privilege? The advantages and enjoyment of Cinque Ports' status in the middle ages". In Bligh, Stuart; Edwards, Elizabeth; Sweetinburgh, Sheila (eds.). Maritime Kent Through the Ages: Gateway to the Sea. Woodbridge: Boydell Press. pp. 277–297. ISBN 978-1-78327-625-7.
- Hawkyard, A. D. K. (1982). "Cinque Ports". In Bindoff, S. T. (ed.). The History of Parliament: The House of Commons, 1509–1558. History of Parliament. Vol. 1. Stroud: Alan Sutton. pp. 253–264. ISBN 0436042827.
- Hinings, Edward (1975). History, People and Places of the Cinque Ports. Bourne End: Spurbooks. ISBN 0-902875-90-6.
- Hueffer, Ford Madox (1900). The Cinque Ports: a historical and descriptive record. Edinburgh: William Blackwood.
- Hull, Felix, ed. (1966). A Calendar of the White and Black Books of the Cinque Ports, 1432–1955. London: H.M.S.O.
- Jeake, Samuel (1728). Charters of the Cinque Ports, Two Ancient Towns, and their Members. London: Bernard Lintot.
- Jessup, Ronald Frederick; Jessup, Frank (1952). The Cinque Ports. London: Batsford.
- Jobson, Adrian (2021). "The maritime defences of Kent from the loss of Normandy to the Hundred Years' War". In Bligh, Stuart; Edwards, Elizabeth; Sweetinburgh, Sheila (eds.). Maritime Kent Through the Ages: Gateway to the Sea. Woodbridge: Boydell Press. pp. 111–131. ISBN 978-1-78327-625-7.
- Lambert, Craig L. (2012). "The contribution of the Cinque Ports to the wars of Edward II and Edward III: new methodologies and estimates". In Gorski, Richard (ed.). Roles of the Sea in Medieval England. Woodbridge: Boydell. pp. 59–78. ISBN 9781843837015.
- Lambert, Craig L. (2018). "Naval service and the Cinque Ports, 1322–1453". In Baker, Gary P.; Lambert, Craig L.; Simpkin, David (eds.). Military Communities in Late Medieval England. Woodbridge: Boydell Press. pp. 211–236. ISBN 9781783272983.
- Lawson, Terence (2004). "The Cinque Ports". In Lawson, Terence; Killingray, David (eds.). An Historical Atlas of Kent. Chichester: Phillimore. p. 52. ISBN 1-86077-255-2.
- Murray, K. M. Elisabeth (1935). The Constitutional History of the Cinque Ports. Manchester: Manchester University Press.
- Rodger, N. A. M. (1996). "The naval service of the Cinque Ports". English Historical Review. 111 (442): 636–651. doi:10.1093/ehr/CXI.442.636.
- Rose, Susan (2012). "The value of the Cinque Ports to the Crown, 1200–1500". In Gorski, Richard (ed.). Roles of the Sea in Medieval England. Woodbridge: Boydell. pp. 41–57. ISBN 9781843837015.
- Roskell, J. S.; Clark, Linda; Rawcliffe, Carole, eds. (1992). "Cinque Ports". The History of Parliament: The House of Commons, 1386–1421. History of Parliament. Vol. 1. Stroud: Alan Sutton. p. 751. ISBN 086299943X.
- Williams, Geoffrey (1971). The Heraldry of the Cinque Ports. Newton Abbot: David & Charles.
