= George Parker (MP) =

George Parker (c. 1619 – 12 July 1673) was an English landowner and politician who sat in the House of Commons in 1659 and 1660.

Parker was the eldest surviving son of Sir Thomas Parker of Ratton, Sussex and his wife Philadelphia Lennard, daughter of Henry Lennard, 12th Baron Dacre and Chrysogona Baker. He matriculated at St Alban's Hall, Oxford on 1 December 1637, aged 18 and entered Lincoln's Inn in 1638.

In 1659, Parker was elected Member of Parliament for Seaford in the Third Protectorate Parliament. He was commissioner for militia for Sussex in March 1660 and lieutenant colonel of the foot militia in April 1660. In April 1660 he was re-elected MP for Seaford in the Convention Parliament. He became J.P and was commissioner for oyer and terminer on the Norfolk circuit in July 1660. He was commissioner for assessment for Sussex and Deputy Lieutenant from August 1660 until his death. In September 1660 he became commissioner for sewers in the rapes of Lewes and Pevensey Sept. 1660 and in December 1660 commissioner for Wittersham marshes. He succeeded to the estates of his father in 1663.

Parker died at the age of about 53 and was buried at Willingdon.

Parker married by 1655 Mary Newdigate, daughter of Richard Newdigate of Arbury, Warwickshire and had two sons.

Parliament of England
Preceded by Not represented in Second Protectorate Parliament	Member of Parliament for Seaford; 1659; With: William Spence	Succeeded by Not represented in Restored Rump
Preceded by Not represented in Restored Rump	Member of Parliament for Seaford; 1660; With: Sir Thomas Dyke	Succeeded by Francis Gratwick; Sir William Thomas, Bt
