= The Colne Community School and College =

Colne Community School
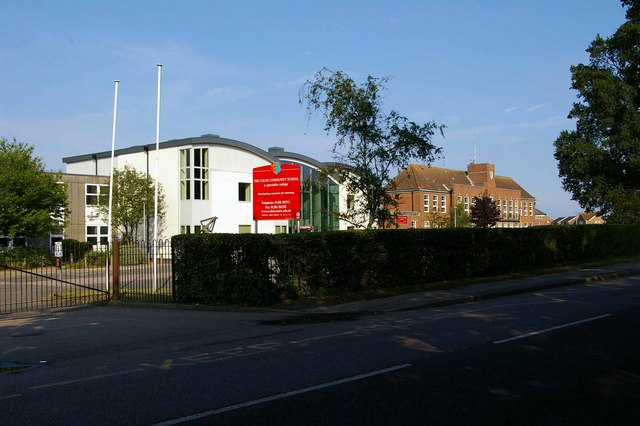

Location
- Church Road; Essex, CO7 0QL; England; 5.81998°N 10.02115°E

Information
- Type: Academy
- Established: 1937
- Department for Education URN: 146795 Tables
- Executive Headteacher: Neil Gallagher
- Head of School: Steven Crane
- Gender: Coeducational
- Age: 11 to 16
- Enrolment: 1251
- Website: https://www.colne.school/

Colne Community School is a secondary school with academy status located in Brightlingsea, Essex, England. The school is an inclusive, comprehensive provider that achieved academy status in 2011 and founded the Thrive Partnership along with the Philip Morant School and College. In 2018 the Thrive Partnership was dissolved and the Colne joined the Sigma Trust in 2018.

== History ==
- Founded on 24 May 1937 as Brightlingsea Senior School
- Changed name in 1943 to Brightlingsea Secondary Modern School
- Changed name in 1957 to Brightlingsea County Secondary School
- Changed name in 1974 to Colne High School
- Changed name in 1991 to Colne School
- Changed name in 1994 to Colne Community School
- Changed name in 2008 to The Colne Community School and College
- Joined the Thrive Partnership in 2011
- Joined the Sigma Trust in 2018
- Changed name in 2023 to Colne Community School after the closure of the sixth form

== Sports facilities ==
Colne Community School's AstroTurf pitch was officially opened by The Princess Anne on 25 February 2003. The Astroturf has since been resurfaced in 2023. The campus also contains Brightlingsea Sports Centre which is used by members of the public and students. This includes tennis, basketball, squash and netball courts. As well as containing a dance area strictly for use by the students of the Colne Community School.
