= Thrive Partnership =

Academy trust in Essex, England

- Type: Academy Trust
- Industry: Education
- Founded: 8 October 2011
- Fate: Dissolved
- Successors: Philip Morant School and College and the Colne Community School and College joined The Sigma Trust
- Headquarters: Colchester, United Kingdom
- Key people: Nardeep Sharma; Catherine Hutley

The Thrive Partnership was an academy trust which operated two academies in Colchester and Brightlingsea. The trust ceased in 2018. The academy trust operated the Philip Morant School and College and the Colne Community School and College.

== Academy trust ==
The trust was founded on 10 October 2011. The trust's headquarters were at the Philip Morant School in Colchester. Both Philip Morant and Colne Community College became academies in 2011, in which the two schools decided to collaborate to create the academic trust.

== Controversy ==
On 23 March 2018 Nardeep Sharma, executive officer of the trust, was suspended along with Catherine Hutley, the executive principal of Philip Morant. From 29 March 2018, an investigation into the Trust Governance took place led by the Department for Education and was published in October 2019. The Thrive Partnership Academy Trust was dissolved on 31 December 2018.

== Demise ==
In 2019, the final investigation report was released by the HM Education & Funding Skills Agency. This included rewarding a contract for web design to a company with links to staff that the board approved.
