= Battle of Brightlingsea =

Animal rights protests in Brightlingsea, England

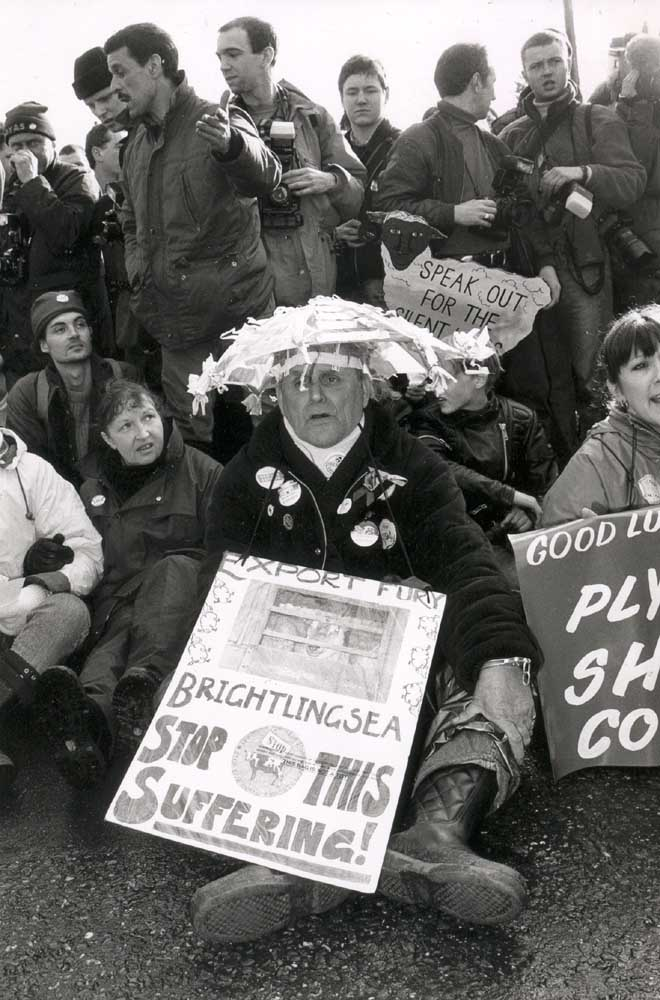
- Protesters blocking the road to Brightlingsea wharf in 1995.
- Date: 16 January – 30 October 1995
- Location: Brightlingsea, Essex; 51.81°N 1.03°E
- Caused by: Opposition to the live export of cattle from the UK to mainland Europe
- Goals: Halting of live export through Brightlingsea port
- Methods: Picketing, Sit-in, Civil resistance
- Status: Ended

Parties
Brightlingsea Against Live Export · Compassion in World Farming	Live Sheep Traders (Ireland) · Livestock Industry Support Trust · Various livestock exporters	Essex Police

Lead figures
Carol Appleby · Francesca d'Silva · Sue Wheeler · Maria Wilby	Roger Mills · Richard Otley · Ernest Oliver	Assistant chief constable Geoffrey Markham

Casualties
- Arrested: 598
- Brightlingsea shown within Essex.

The Battle of Brightlingsea refers to a series of protests by animal rights supporters held in Brightlingsea, England, between 16 January and 30 October 1995, to prevent the export of livestock through the town. During this time period, early 1990s, this action had been talked and argued about among individuals. The name was first used by the media in The Independent newspaper, after Essex Police used riot control measures against demonstrators.

By 1995, members of the public had become increasingly concerned about the conditions in which animals were reared, transported and slaughtered. Some examples of the farm animals that were being exported to continental Europe were cattle, veal calves and sheep. British exporters had been forced to use small ports such as Brightlingsea to transport livestock after the country's three main ferry operators introduced bans on live cargo. This followed mounting public pressure about the suffering of sheep and cattle packed into huge transport vehicles for excessive periods. There were 2 national campaign groups trying to help this cause; the Royal Society for the Prevention of Cruelty to Animals and Compassion in World Farming. They had called for a ban on all live exports by limiting journeys to eight hours. At the time, European regulations allowed for journeys of up to 24 hours without food or water. They used different tactics to highlight this issue, and eventually succeeded in influencing public opinion so that ferry companies took action. As a result of the ferry company ban, however, the transportation of the cattle was moved to the small, independently operated port of Brightlingsea.

The demonstrations, which were composed largely of local residents, ended on 30 October, when exporters announced they would no longer transport animals through the town because of the extra cost and logistical chaos caused by the daily protests. In practice, the export of live animals continued from other small ports, halting only in February 1996 when the European Union banned all meat exports from Britain over fears of "mad cow disease" entering the European food chain. The ban was lifted in 2006.

== Background ==
=== Cross-Channel trade ===
In 1988 there were approximately 1,000 abattoirs in Britain. By 1992 this number had fallen to 700 of which half were at risk of closure because of changes to European Commission (EC) regulations. Prior to this date most livestock in the country were only a couple of hours at most by road from the nearest abattoir. The closures meant much longer road journeys were required and for some farmers it became economically viable to send livestock to continental Europe for slaughter, and, under EC rather than UK regulations, transport times of up to 24 hours without rest, food or water were permissible. Investigations found that even this extended period was "routinely flouted."

British animal welfare groups, such as CIWF and the RSPCA, campaigned against live exports largely because of the suffering of cattle during these long-distance journeys. The RSPCA, which had been campaigning for a complete ban on live exports since 1991, said: "All animals should be slaughtered as close as possible to where they are reared." The British Veterinary Association adopted a similar stance, declaring that they were "opposed to the export of animals for immediate slaughter and believe that all animals should be slaughtered as near to the point of production as possible."

There was also concern about the continuing export of between 300,000 and 400,000 calves each year to Europe, where they were then confined in darkness in veal crates and fed on low-iron, liquid diets designed to produce a commercially valuable pale flesh. Veal crates had been banned in Britain since 1990, but there were no regulations in place to prevent the export of calves to other countries using veal crates or on the subsequent re-import of the meat into Britain.

In 1992 250,000 live calves had been exported for veal crating to the Netherlands alone, and 1.4 million live sheep had been exported. Following the introduction of the single European market in 1993, live animals were regarded as "'agricultural products' in exactly the same way as a consignment of turnips", and any attempt to regulate their journey times or conditions of travel was interpreted as 'a restraint on trade' and, therefore, illegal.

=== Commercial interests ===
Commercial interests played a large part in the growth of live exports. Although it cost four times as much to transport a live animal to France than a carcass, British lambs slaughtered in French abattoirs were marked with a French meat inspection stamp instead of the UK abattoir stamp used on British carcass imports. This allowed the meat to be labelled and sold to consumers as "French produced" at a large premium, outweighing the increased transport costs.

A similar practice was carried out in Spain with consignments of live animals exported ostensibly "for further fattening." This bypassed a British ban on animals being exported for slaughter in Spanish abattoirs, which had been imposed because of "public revulsion at [Spanish] slaughterhouse standards." After a few days of grazing in Spain, the animals were re-classified as Spanish-reared and subsequently slaughtered.

Live animals also provided extra profit for slaughterhouses in the form of the so-called "fifth quarter": the offal, hide, intestine (for sausage skins) and, in sheep, the fleece.

=== Calls for ban rejected ===
In April 1994 Nicholas Soames, the minister for Agriculture, Fisheries and Food (MAFF), announced that despite national campaigns calling for an outright ban on live exports, this could not be imposed as it "would be in breach of European Union law." He said that the Government was "acutely aware" of the great strength of feeling and that the legal department at MAFF had considered a ban under article 36 of the Treaty of Rome, which allowed a restriction on trade on the grounds of public morality or protection of health of humans, animals and plants.

The advisers had concluded that article 36 "is not available as a basis of action in an area where the Community has established EC legislation." In response to a question in Parliament, Soames told Sir Teddy Taylor: "It is not for individual member states to constrain intra-community trade in order to impose higher standards on their own territory". Sir Teddy later told the press: "What this means is that there is absolutely nothing which the Government and Parliament can do to stop the traffic and that the great national campaigns by the animal charities are pointless... [It is] a massive disappointment which will cause concern to many people in the UK who are concerned about the suffering of animals".

== Withdrawal of ferry services ==
=== Sheep deaths in transit ===
Protests against live export began to be held at British ports and airports. In August 1994 MAFF launched an inquiry after Greek authorities reported that a lorry loaded with 400 sheep from England had arrived in the Greek port of Igoumenitsa on a ferry from Brindisi, Italy on 8 July with 302 of the animals having died in transit. No export licence to Greece had been granted for the livestock, which left for the Netherlands on the Dover to Calais ferry on 5 July. Chief Superintendent Don Balfour, head of the RSPCA special operations unit, said: "It is an awful example of what can go wrong on these long journeys with live animals. I question why it is necessary to subject animals to such journeys when there are perfectly adequate slaughterhouses in this country and refrigerated lorries to carry the meat abroad."

=== Public pressure to ban exports ===
In August 1994, tabloid newspaper the Daily Star published an article disclosing that British Airways (BA) were transporting live sheep between Perth, Scotland and Singapore. Within twenty four hours of the newspaper being published, Robert Ayling, BA's group managing director, banned the carriage of live animals destined for slaughter on BA flights. In the face of increasing public pressure, Brittany Ferries announced that as of 22 August 1994 it would no longer export live animals for slaughter on its six routes to France and Spain. Demonstrators protested at the Dover and Ashford ferry terminals in Kent, and the offices of Stena Sealink ferries were firebombed.

As a result, Stena Sealink announced it would no longer transport live animals. Jim Hannah, the company's communications director, said: "We have acted essentially for commercial reasons. Over the past few months we have received thousands of letters from our customers saying they do not want to travel on a ferry that carries livestock." P&O said it would stop carrying animals to mainland Europe for slaughter from October 1994, "unless an improvement in European Union standards was imminent."

As public feeling against live export grew, even those ferry operators which did not transport livestock felt compelled to distance themselves from the trade. Sally Ferries UK sent out a press release "stressing it [had] rejected trade in live freight for more than 13 years" although it was actually a local by-law which prohibited them from carrying live exports from their port.

=== Exporters by-pass ferry bans ===
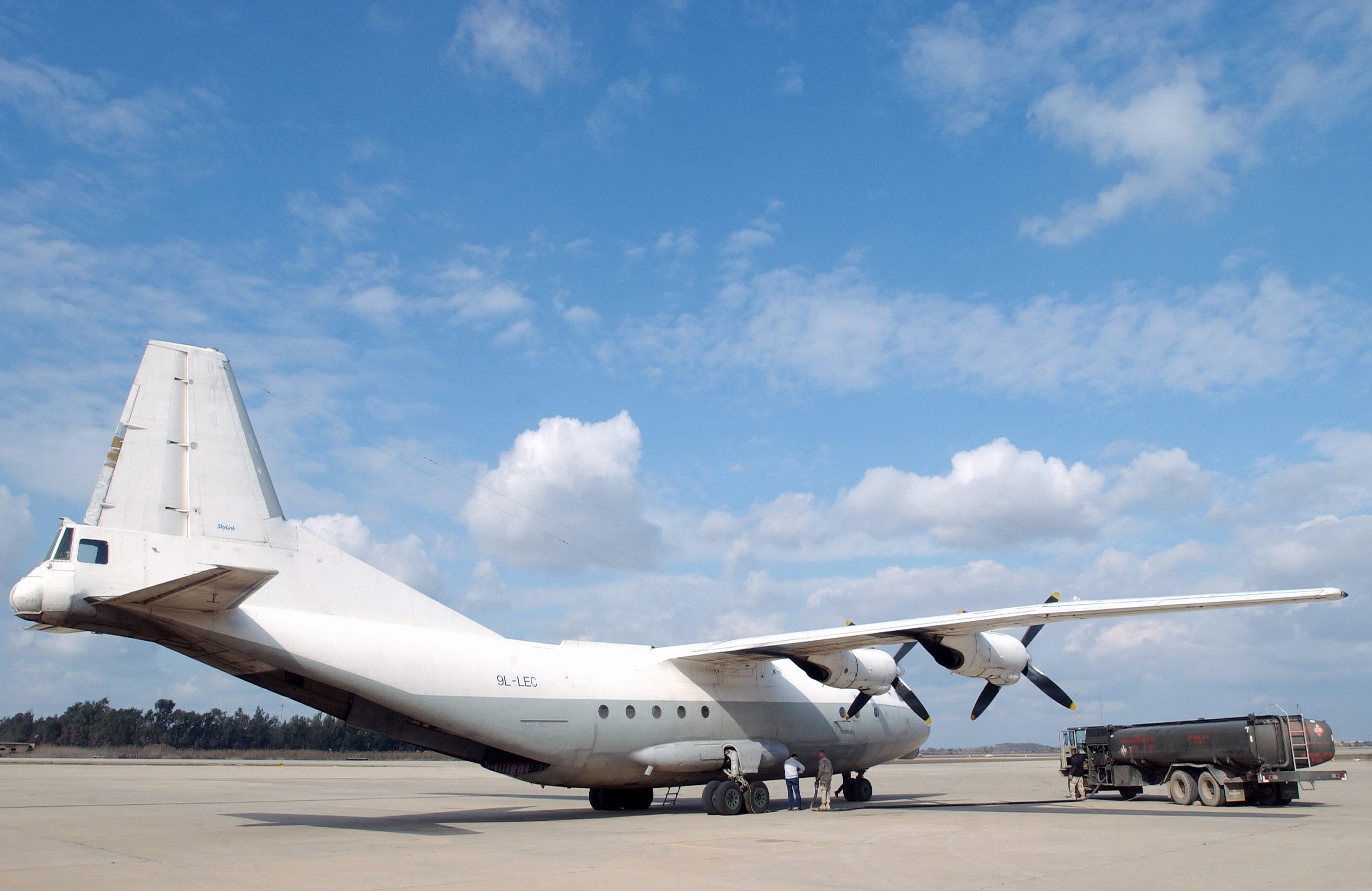
An Antonov AN-12 military cargo aircraft. This type of aircraft was used to transport up to 240 calves at a time from the UK to Europe.

By 1 October 1994, when the ferry operators' ban began to affect the export trade, MAFF had received five applications from smaller operators to take over the trade. The new operators planned to carry only animals and freight "and would therefore be less exposed to public disapproval." MT Shipping planned to sail from Harwich, Essex to Boulogne-sur-Mer, France, an eight-hour journey much longer than the traditional one from Dover to Calais. The company said it would take between 50 and 110 lorries on its ferry, while P&O and Stena Sealink normally carried no more than twelve livestock lorries on their ships, mainly due to ventilation and heat problems.

They also asked permission to use former East European military transport planes to fly animals to mainland Europe, a move opposed by campaigners because the aircraft were unpressurised. Balkan Airlines flights from Humberside Airport to Rotterdam in the Netherlands using these aircraft were approved by MAFF on 20 October 1994. These flights were halted at the end of November 1994 due to "the strength of public feeling". Other flights took place from Belfast Airport, Glasgow Prestwick Airport, Bournemouth Airport and Coventry Airport.

On 28 October 1994 a ferry carrying 3,000 lambs sailed from Grimsby to Calais, a journey of about 18 hours, in a "trial run" intended to open up a new route. The animals were then transported for 10 hours by road to an abattoir in central France. The RSPCA said: "We are appalled that these animals have to endure such a long and stressful journey. It is simply not necessary for animals to be transported live for food." In November 1994 Ferrylink Freight Services, owned by Mersey Docks and Harbour Company, announced they would transport livestock from Sheerness in Kent to Vlissingen in the Netherlands. Following the first shipment of 3,000 animals, Ferrylink postponed further sailings following bomb threats.

On 30 November 1994 a new route was opened from Millbay docks, Plymouth. Approximately 100 police officers were used to escort five lorries loaded with sheep and calves through protesters. On 3–4 December 1994 Glasgow Prestwick Airport took out advertisements in Scottish newspapers asking the public to write to them to say whether cattle shipments should continue from the airport. On 9 December 1994 the airport announced it would no longer transport live animals. On 21 December 1994 Air Algérie Flight 702P crashed at Coventry on its way to pick up a cargo of 200 calves. All five crew were killed.

By January 1995 Dover had also banned livestock cargoes and the only routes still available for live export were Coventry Airport, Plymouth and Shoreham-by-Sea. Shoreham had become the scene of daily violent demonstrations – dubbed the "Siege of Shoreham" by the media – as protestors attempted to prevent cattle trucks from entering the harbour.

== Exports through Brightlingsea ==
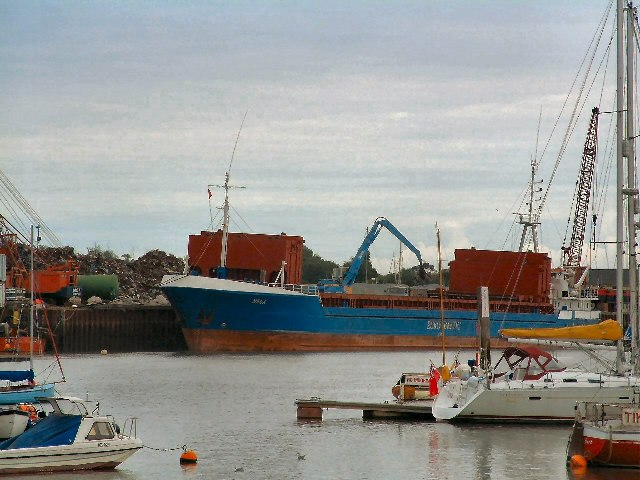
Oliver's Wharf, Brightlingsea. Named for its owner Ernest Oliver, this privately owned wharf was the loading point for livestock vessels.

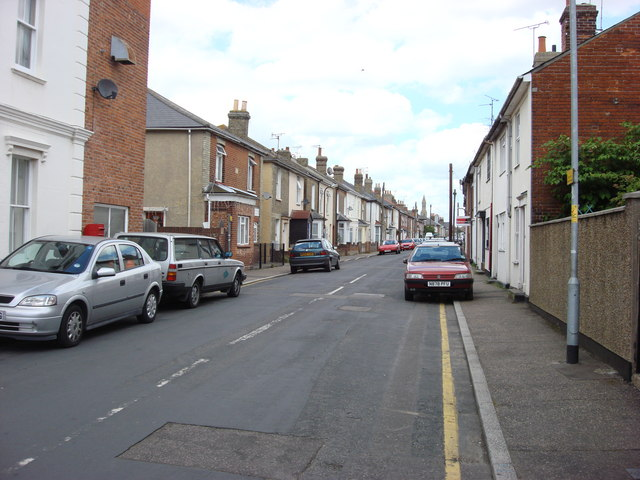
New Street, Brightlingsea. The compact nature of the route to the wharf through the small town was ideal for protestors.

On 11 January 1995 it was revealed that exporters planned to open a new route from Brightlingsea. That an attempt to load livestock at the town's wharf was imminent was widely known by both the authorities and the protesters. Writing in The Guardian on 13 January, David McKie, the newspaper's deputy editor, said: "Next week may also be the first time you ask yourself: Where is Brightlingsea? It's been situated almost unnoticed for many centuries eight miles south-east of Colchester. You may need to know because it's one of the minor league ports which may be the scene of confrontations next week as the trade tries to use it for the export of calves, now that Shoreham is so troublesome."

The Independent warned: "If plans go ahead for the attempted export of calves through its port, residents of [Brightlingsea] (eight miles south-east of Colchester on the B1029, if you're passing that way) had better start barricading their windows now. Protesters, journalists and cameramen will be looking to make it this week's Shoreham-by-Sea."

Brightlingsea's layout was ideal for the protesters, and also for the media: unlike other ports, the route that livestock trucks would need to follow through the town to the wharf was very narrow and easily blocked, and also meant that people on the roadside were close enough to the trucks to touch the animals as they passed. Assistant Chief Constable (ACC) Geoffrey Markham of Essex Police described the wharf as "the wrong end of a narrow three mile road in a medieval town."

=== First protest ===
On 16 January the Danish vessel Caroline was due to sail at midnight from the town with a cargo of 2,000 sheep destined for Nieuwpoort, Belgium. Local residents formed an ad hoc protest group, Brightlingsea Against Live Exports (BALE), and began arriving to demonstrate at approximately 8.30am. By the time the first vehicle arrived at 6.35pm, carrying 400 sheep, around 1,500 people, mostly local, had gathered. Apart from dirt thrown at the truck's windscreen, the demonstration was largely peaceful and consisted of people lying and sitting in the road to block vehicle movement.

ACC Markham said: "There were young people in the crowd and elderly people. The situation was, in my mind, quite dangerous. On these grounds, I decided that the vehicle should turn around. Having spoken to the organisers of the demonstration, I took the decision that there will be no movement of livestock into Brightlingsea tonight. I will now meet with my colleagues to think about the strategic issue." BALE organiser Francesca d'Silva said: "We are glad that the lorry has been turned back but we are not convinced none will come again. We'll be here as long as it takes."

Richard Otley complained that the police should have ensured that the vehicles reached the wharf and said: "It's ridiculous. That cargo should have been loaded last night." Otley also said that he had complained to his Member of Parliament, John Major, who was also the prime minister, and to Home Secretary Michael Howard.

=== Storms prevent sailings ===
Plans to make a second attempt at loading the Caroline were delayed on 17 January when sailings at Brightlingsea were cancelled due to 70 mph winds off the south coast. BALE leafletted every household in the town asking people to attend the protest scheduled for 18 January. They also announced that they would be using boats to intercept the Caroline in the event that the main roadside protest failed.

== Operation Gunfleet: Change in police tactics ==
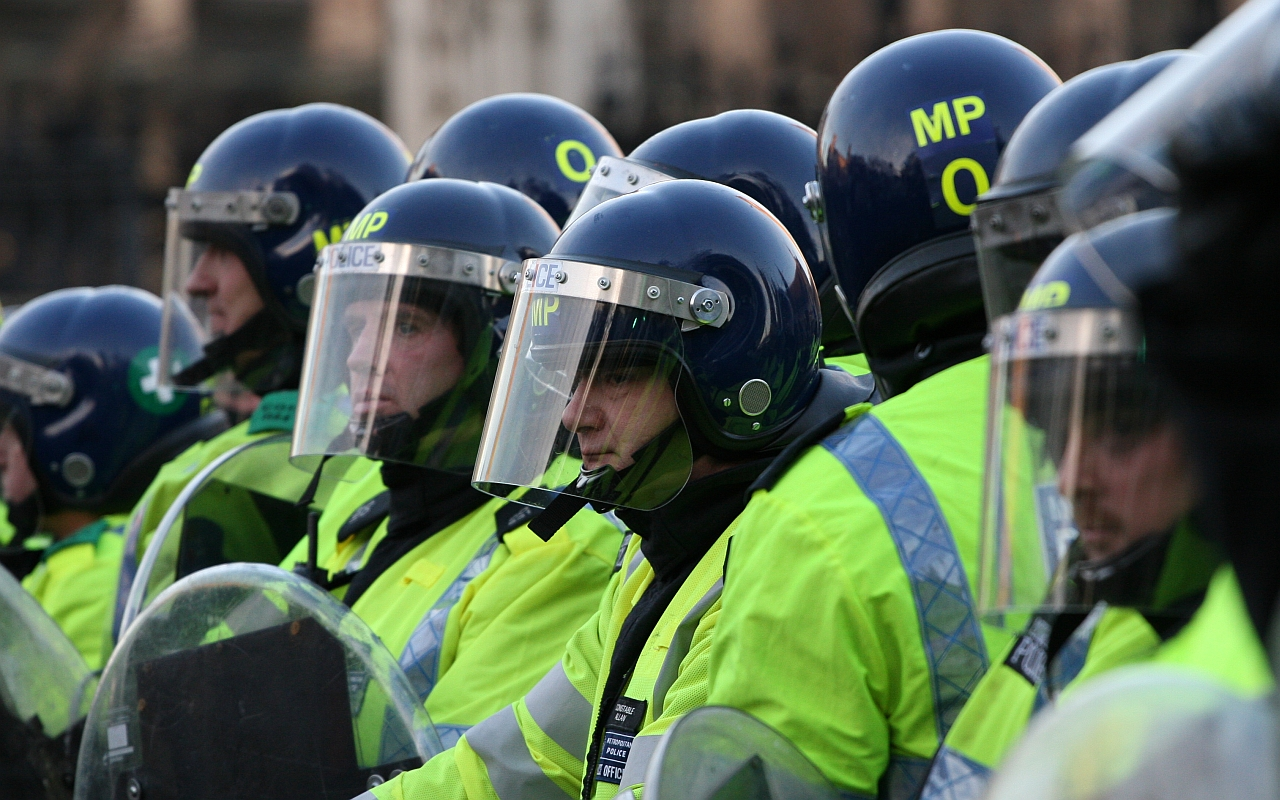
Protective riot equipment as worn by police in the UK. The decision to deploy officers in riot gear at Brightlingsea, despite there being no violence at previous demonstrations, was believed by protestors to be an attempt to intimidate the crowd, which included many elderly residents and children.

Exporter Roger Mills threatened to sue Essex Police for £30,000 compensation over their failure to escort sheep to the wharf on 16 January. He also warned that he would transport livestock through Brightlingsea on 18 January "with or without police support," and ACC Markham responded by ordering the largest public order operation in Essex since the 1950s, codenamed Operation Gunfleet.

Just before 8.00am on 18 January trucks carrying 2,000 sheep made their way through the town. Approximately 500 protestors had gathered to attempt to block their route. Essex Police deployed approximately 300 officers, many in riot gear. The first group of protestors who sat in the road were dragged out by police and anybody attempting to take their place was stamped on or punched by officers. By 10.00am the livestock had been loaded on to the Caroline which successfully left the harbour at 1.00pm despite the efforts of protesters in inflatable boats. Exporter Richard Otley said: "It was marvellous. The police mounted a super operation."

Essex Police received more than 200 complaints about "excessive riot-style violence" carried out by officers. Protestor Antona Mead, the wife of a local magistrate, said that the demonstrators were sitting peacefully in the road when police in riot gear and wielding long-handled batons "just steamed in and jackbooted their way through the crowd. We were treated like the worst kind of football hooligans." One elderly protestor, 61-year-old Fred Griffin, said: "There are no militants here. [The police] just punched their way through perfectly well-behaved demonstrators like Robocops." Rick Morgan, the mayor of Brightlingsea, said:

I saw nothing but a peaceful protest. The reaction by the police was just over the top. The town is united against this live animal trade and these were local people attempting to make a peaceful protest. They included pensioners, children and mothers with babies.

Writing in The Guardian newspaper, protestor Bill Campbell expressed his shock at the "overwhelming nature and the provocative style of the police action" given that the previous demonstration had been non-violent and ACC Markham had described the protestors "in approving terms regarding their mood and behaviour." Campbell described the police tactics as "a new but revealing experience" and said:

A good natured crowd had gathered, including both young and old, healthy and infirm... The first action by the police was to approach this crowd from the front and the rear with overwhelming numbers wearing riot gear. The crowd was compressed and trapped. It was a frightening and sinister sight, provocative in the extreme. We were afforded no opportunity to demonstrate. As the police closed on us, their mood was threatening and violent. While some individual police, as the situation developed, behaved with care and courtesy, many appeared to be excessively aggressive.

Overall, the situation got violent towards the end of the campaign. There were fights that broke out between the people of the protest and the police. Items such as beer bottles and stones were used during these fights, which is one example why the protest turned violent.

=== Use of the Criminal Justice and Public Order Act ===
On 10 April 1995 ACC Markham sent a letter to every household in Brightlingsea warning that from 18 April 1995 protestors risked arrest and imprisonment under the Criminal Justice and Public Order Act 1994. In the letter, Markham wrote: "A belief has grown among demonstrators who feel it lawful to routinely walk in front of vehicles on the highway. It is my intention to use the provisions of the Public Order Act to restrain unlawful activity."

The letter advised that after 18 April no demonstrations would be permitted at the docks and that demonstrations in other parts of the town would be restricted to one per month and only if authorised in advance by the police. All persons planning to attend a demonstration were required to fill out an application form 6 days in advance for each attendance. Civil rights group Liberty said the letter was unprecedented.

As the legislation allowed the organisers of demonstrations to be prosecuted in the event of public disorder, BALE formally disbanded. On 17 April 1995 Maria Wilby told the media: "As of tonight BALE will not exist although the protest will go on. People are very frightened but are prepared to be arrested." John Wadham, Liberty's legal director, said: "The police tactics are incredibly naive. The only opportunity for ensuring a procession continues to be peaceful is if the police can talk to the organisers. If there are no organisers, it is more likely to be chaotic and confrontational." Mayor Morgan told the media that the police threat to use public order legislation had angered residents and many more were expected to join the protests as a result. Following a meeting with ACC Markham, Morgan said:

We were given the very strong impression by Mr Markham that this had been discussed with the other police forces involved with live exports and with the Home Office. It appears that there is strong backing for Essex Police to use the Public Order Act as a test for Dover. If they can win here, they can win at Dover. The police are playing for very high stakes.

On 20 April 1995 Essex Police deployed 300 officers to Brightlingsea to permit the passage of 4 livestock trucks. Around 500 protestors sat in the road to block the convoy, ignoring police warnings that "their actions constituted an illegal gathering." The proposed use of public order legislation had also led to the protestors being joined by activists from the Socialist Workers Party. When police officers moved in to begin arresting protestors, violence broke out and the police were pelted with bottles, cans, coins, eggs and paint. A number of officers were injured and taken for treatment at Colchester General Hospital. Former BALE organiser Carol Appleby said that the disbanding of the co-ordinating group due to police threats of legal action had "removed the opportunity to control renegade elements."

Restrictive bail conditions

The media were critical of the use of the Criminal Justice and Public Order Act by police to set bail conditions "without reference to a court", and to remove "the presumption of bail for those facing a second charge." This allowed the police to arrest protesters on minor charges and then "severely curtail" their activities and movements on bail conditions enforced by the threat of jail. Protestors at Brightlingsea found themselves being bailed on the condition that they did not attend any live export protests or related meetings.

== Suspension of live exports ==
By September 1995, the only UK ports still carrying out live exports were Brightlingsea and Dover. The protests at Brightlingsea continued daily, attracting up to 1,000 protestors. On 30 October 1995 Roger Mills announced that he would cease exporting through Brightlingsea and instead use Dover "for a few weeks" while discussing the matter with the police. After all of these events took place, exporters did not go through Brightlingsea anymore due to the extreme events of the people.

With the total cost of 10-month police operation having reached £2.25 million, Mills had been restricted to only one shipment per day, high tide permitting, and none at the weekends. Campaigners called the suspension a "major triumph."

== The "militant middle class" ==
One of the most striking features of the demonstrations at Brightlingsea was the demographic of the protestors themselves. The majority were local people, "many of whom had never protested about anything in their lives before." Survey results showed that:

- 82% of the protestors were women
- 81% had never protested before
- 73% were aged between 41 and 70
- 71% were local residents
- 38% were retired

Both the media and the authorities were "taken by surprise by the intensity of support" given to the protest and the presence of so many pensioners and mothers with young children "challenged the...stereotype of the typical animal rights protestor." The media had "expected such events to be dominated by the usual suspects, Earth First campaigners, Greenpeace and animal rights groups" but instead found middle class, adult protesters alongside and outnumbering "the radical young." Caroline Davies, writing in The Daily Telegraph, characterised the protestors as "middle class, moral and mad as hell", while Madeleine Bunting for The Guardian identified the typical protestor as a "middle class, home counties, middle-aged concerned [housewife]."

== Legal actions ==
A number of legal actions arose from the protests.

=== Injunctions ===
On 29 August 1995 Roger Mills applied to the High Court of Justice for an immediate injunction banning 12 named protestors – 9 women and 3 men – from obstructing his trucks entering the port. Although injunctions had previously been sought to prevent trade unions carrying out mass protests, this was believed to be the first time that injunctions against named members of the public had been applied for. Mr Justice Morrison turned down the application and adjourned the case for a full hearing.

On 22 September 1995 the application was heard in the High Court by Mr Justice Forbes. As well as seeking the injunction banning the named protestors, Mills also applied for costs and damages of £500,000 to be awarded against the defendants. Mills claimed that "the sheer number of arrests, 583 to date, plus the existence of BALE... and fliers distributed on its behalf amounted to a conspiracy" and that "the defendants were involved in breaking the law and were inciting others to do the same." Mr Justice Forbes responded that there were "occasions where unlawful activities gained the admiration of law-abiding citizens" and said: "What Mahatma Gandhi did was certainly against the law... but most people approved of what he did." The injunction was not granted.

=== Prosecution of Tilly Merritt ===
In January 1996 Tilly Merritt, a 79-year-old woman from Brightlingsea, was convicted of assaulting Police Constable Kevin Conermey after spraying him with water from a garden hose during the protests in February 1995. She was sentenced to 2 days imprisonment when she told magistrates at Colchester that she refused to pay the £302 fine. Well-wishers paid the fine while she was waiting for the prison van to take her to HM Prison Holloway, and she was released.

=== Prosecution of Roger Mills ===
On 1 March 1996, at Harwich magistrates court, Roger Mills was convicted of dangerous driving. The offence took place during the protests in 1995 when Mills deliberately drove his vehicle into a group of demonstrators. He was fined £1000 and banned from driving for 12 months.

== See also ==
- Animal welfare in the United Kingdom
