= Normans Bay =

Coastal fishing hamlet in East Sussex, England

Coordinates: 50.8257°N 0.3929°E

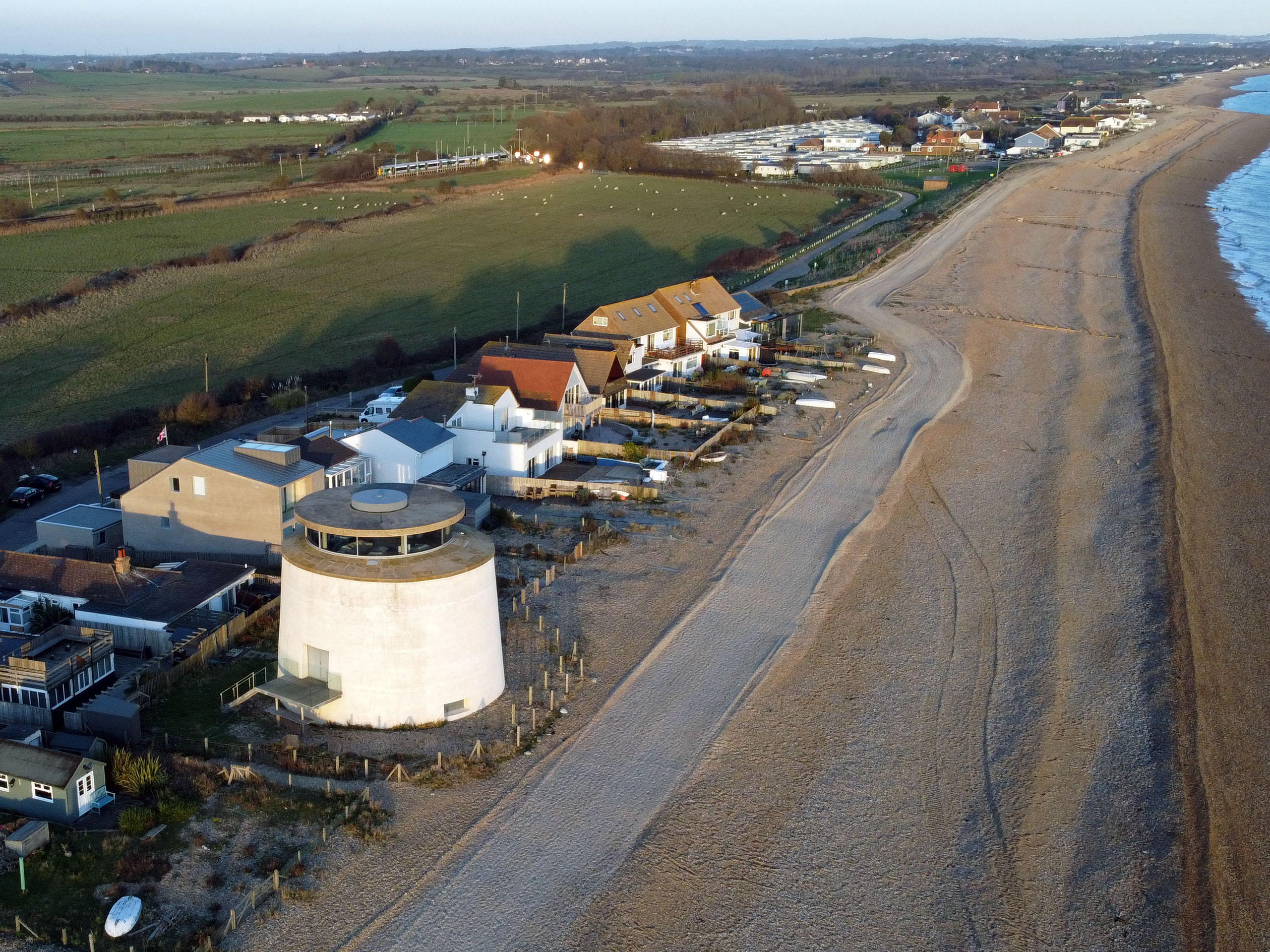
Normans Bay with Martello Tower 55 in the foreground.

The Star Inn public house

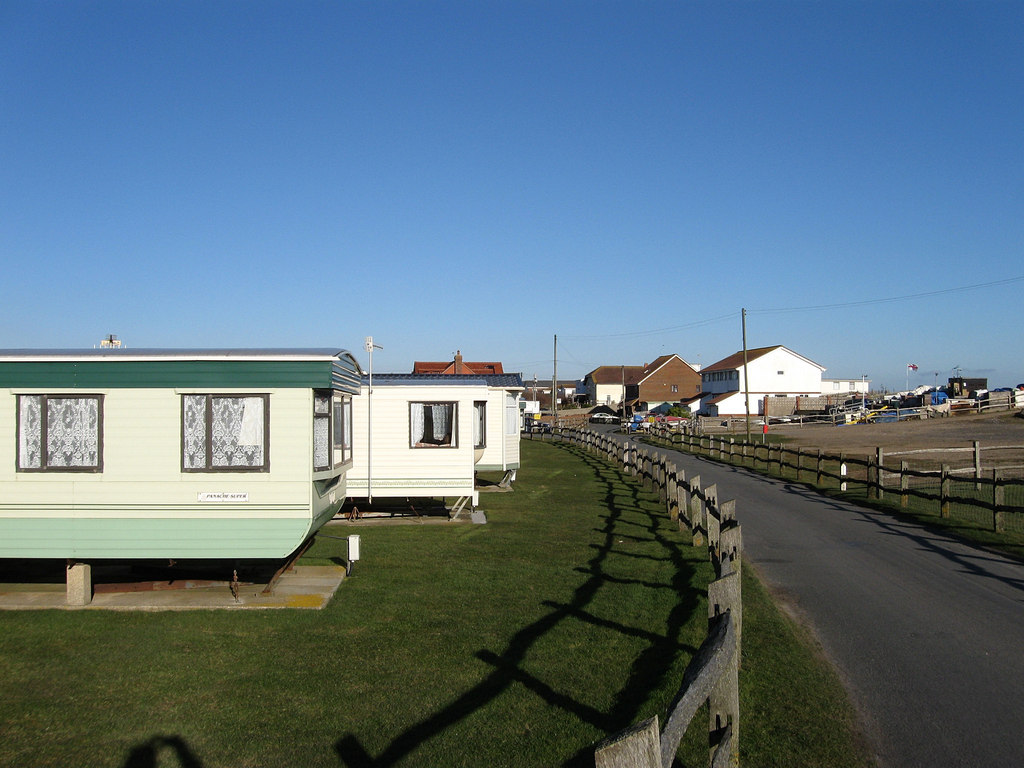
Normans Bay Caravan Park

Normans Bay (Normans' Bay on Ordnance Survey maps) is a coastal fishing hamlet in Bexhill-on-Sea, East Sussex, England.

The 8th Duke of Devonshire donated this land for a combined school and place of worship in the 1860s to be known as Pevensey Sluice. It was later renamed Normans Bay when the railway halt of that name was first opened in 1905.

Normans Bay is near the popular seaside resorts of Eastbourne and Brighton to the west, with a regular service at Normans Bay railway station. The nearest bus service is in Pevensey Bay.

Some points of interest include a sand and shingle beach, Martello tower 55, two caravan sites and a The Star Inn public house. To the north is protected marshland known as Pevensey Levels, and the abandoned medieval village of Northeye.

== Shipwreck ==
In 2005 divers trying to free a lobster pot discovered a large anchor and cannons offshore. This was at first thought to be the remains of the English warship HMS Resolution, which sunk there in 1703. However, ongoing research suggests the wreck might be that of the Dutch warship Wapen van Utrecht, sunk during the Battle of Beachy Head in 1690.
