= Cinque ports parliament constituencies =

Form of constituency in pre-1832 UK House of Commons

Until the Reform Act 1832, there were eight constituencies in the Parliament of England and its successors related to the Cinque Ports. The cinque port constituencies were slightly different from parliamentary boroughs. The 1832 act abolished most such distinctions, and disfranchised some of the cinque ports as rotten.

== List ==
The eight constituencies were:

- the original five Cinque Ports:
  - Dover
  - Hastings
  - Hythe (reduced to one member 1832)
  - New Romney (abolished 1832)
  - Sandwich
- the two Ancient Towns:
  - Rye (abolished 1832)
  - Winchelsea (abolished 1832)
- one connected town:
  - Seaford (abolished 1832)

== Peculiarities ==
The ways in which the cinque ports differed from parliamentary boroughs included:

- Whereas the MPs from a borough were called "burgesses" (or "citizens" in a borough with city status) those from a cinque port were called barons. Barons had higher precedence than other MPs: whereas burgesses and citizens were called to a new Parliament on the first day, and knights of the shire (elected for county constituencies) on the second day, the barons were summoned to the Commons on the third day, along with the peers to the House of Lords.
- Whereas the returning officer in a borough was the mayor or other head of the municipal corporation, the returning officer in the cinque ports was the Lord Warden of the Cinque Ports
- Until the Glorious Revolution, the Lord Warden claimed the right to nominate one of the two members returned by each cinque port. This right was contested by the corporations. In the 1620s, Sandwich and Dover burgesses objected to Lord Zouche's nominees; the Sandwich objection was rejected, while that of Dover was accepted and the MPs unseated. The right was definitively extinguished by the Parliamentary Elections Act 1689 (2 Will. & Mar. c. 7).
