= Thomas Parker (died 1663) =

English landowner and politician

The Honourable Sir Thomas Parker
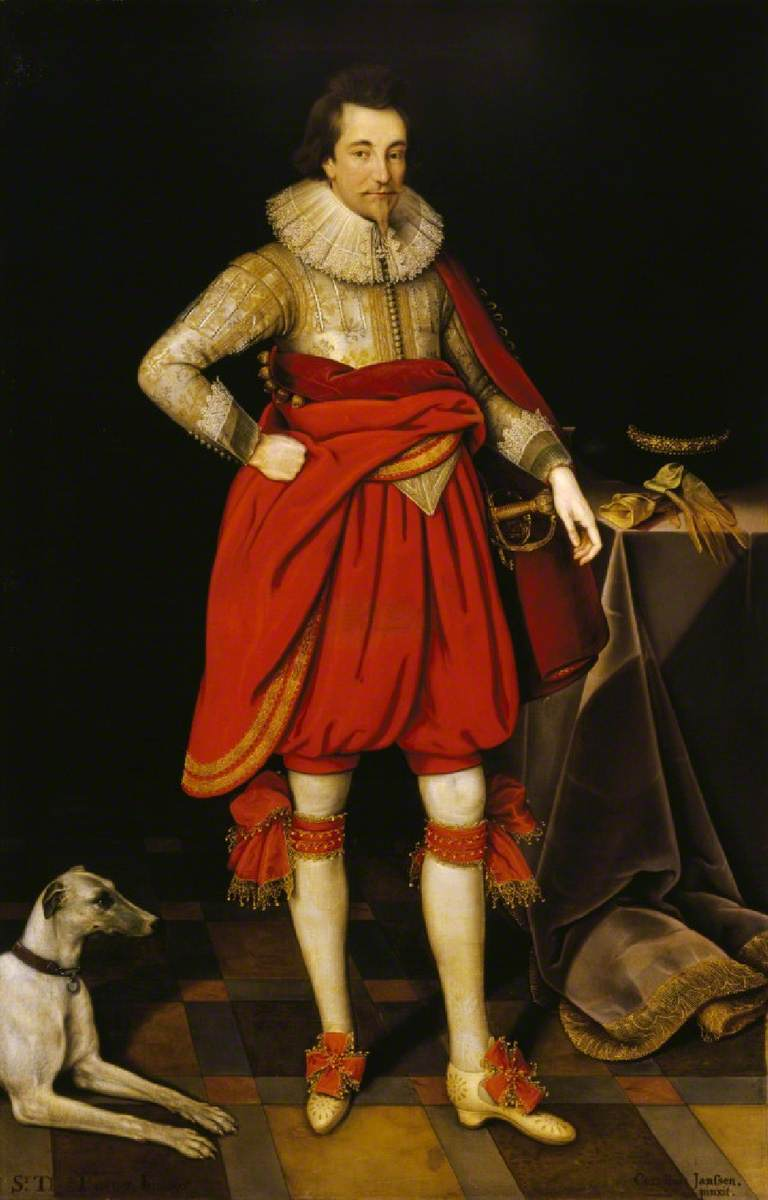
- Sir Thomas Parker of Ratton (b.1594/5 - 1663), c. 1620, Marcus Gheeraerts the Younger

Member of Parliament for Hastings
- In office May 1626 – June 1626

Member of Parliament for Seaford
- In office February 1641 – December 1648

Member of Parliament for Sussex
- In office 1656–1656

Personal details
- Born: 1595
- Died: 31 May 1663 (aged 67–68)
- Resting place: St Mary the Virgin Church, Willingdon, East Sussex; 50.799732°N 0.254083°E
- Spouse: Philadelphia Lennard
- Children: George Parker; Grace Parker; Philadelphia Parker; Rachel Parker; Catherine Parker; Anne Parker; Margaret Parker
- Parents: Sir Nicholas Parker; Catherine Temple

Sir Thomas Parker (1595 – 31 May 1663) of Ratton was an English landowner and politician who sat in the House of Commons between 1626 and 1656. He was elected MP for Hastings in 1626, Seaford in 1641, Sussex in 1656 and was knighted in 1617.

He was the eldest son and heir of Sir Nicholas Parker (1547 – 1620) of Ratton and his third wife, Catherine Temple, daughter of Sir John Temple of Stowe, Buckinghamshire.

He married, in 1618, Philadelphia Lennard, daughter of Henry Lennard, 12th Baron Dacre and Chrysogona Baker, daughter of Sir Richard Baker of Sissinghurst. Their children included:

- George Parker
- Grace Parker
- Philadelphia Parker
- Rachel Parker
- Catherine Parker
- Anne Parker
- Margaret Parker

Lady Parker died 12 January 1662. He died 31 May 1663 and was buried at Willingdon.

== Sources ==
- Borman, T. (3 January 2008) [First Published 2004]. "Parker, Sir Nicholas". Oxford Dictionary of National Biography (online ed.). Oxford University Press. doi:10.1093/ref:odnb/21328. (Subscription, Wikipedia Library access or UK public library membership required.)
- Burke, John; Burke, John Bernard (1841). A Genealogical and Heraldic History of the Extinct and Dormant Baronetcies of England, Ireland, and Scotland (2nd ed.). London: Printed for Scott, Webster, and Geary.
- Lefevre, Peter (2010). "Parker, Sir Thomas (1595-1663), of Ratton, Willingdon, Suss". In Thrush, Andrew; Ferris, John P. (eds.). The History of Parliament: the House of Commons 1604-1629 – via History of Parliament Online.
- Llewellyn, Nigel (2014). "East Sussex Church Monuments - 1530 to 1830 - Archive of Photographs: Willingdon, St. Mary the Virgin". Sussex Record Society. sussexrecordsociety.org.
- R.C.G. (1981). "Lennard, Sir Henry (1570-1616), of Chevening, Kent and Hurstmonceaux Castle, Suss". In Hasler, P.W. (ed.). The History of Parliament: The House of Commons 1558–1603 – via History of Parliament Online.
- R.C.G. (1981). "Parker, Sir Nicholas (1547-1620), of Ratton and Willingdon, Suss.". In Hasler, P.W. (ed.). The History of Parliament: The House of Commons 1558–1603 – via History of Parliament Online.
- Shaw, W.A.; Burtchaell, B.D. (1906). The Knights of England: A Complete Record from the Earliest Time to the Present Day of the Knights of All the Orders of Chivalry in England, Scotland, and Ireland, and of Knights Bachelors, Incorporating a Complete List of Knights Bachelors Dubbed in Ireland. Vol. II. London: Sherrat and Hughes.
