= Brightlingsea =

Town in Essex, England

Coordinates: 51.81°N 1.03°E

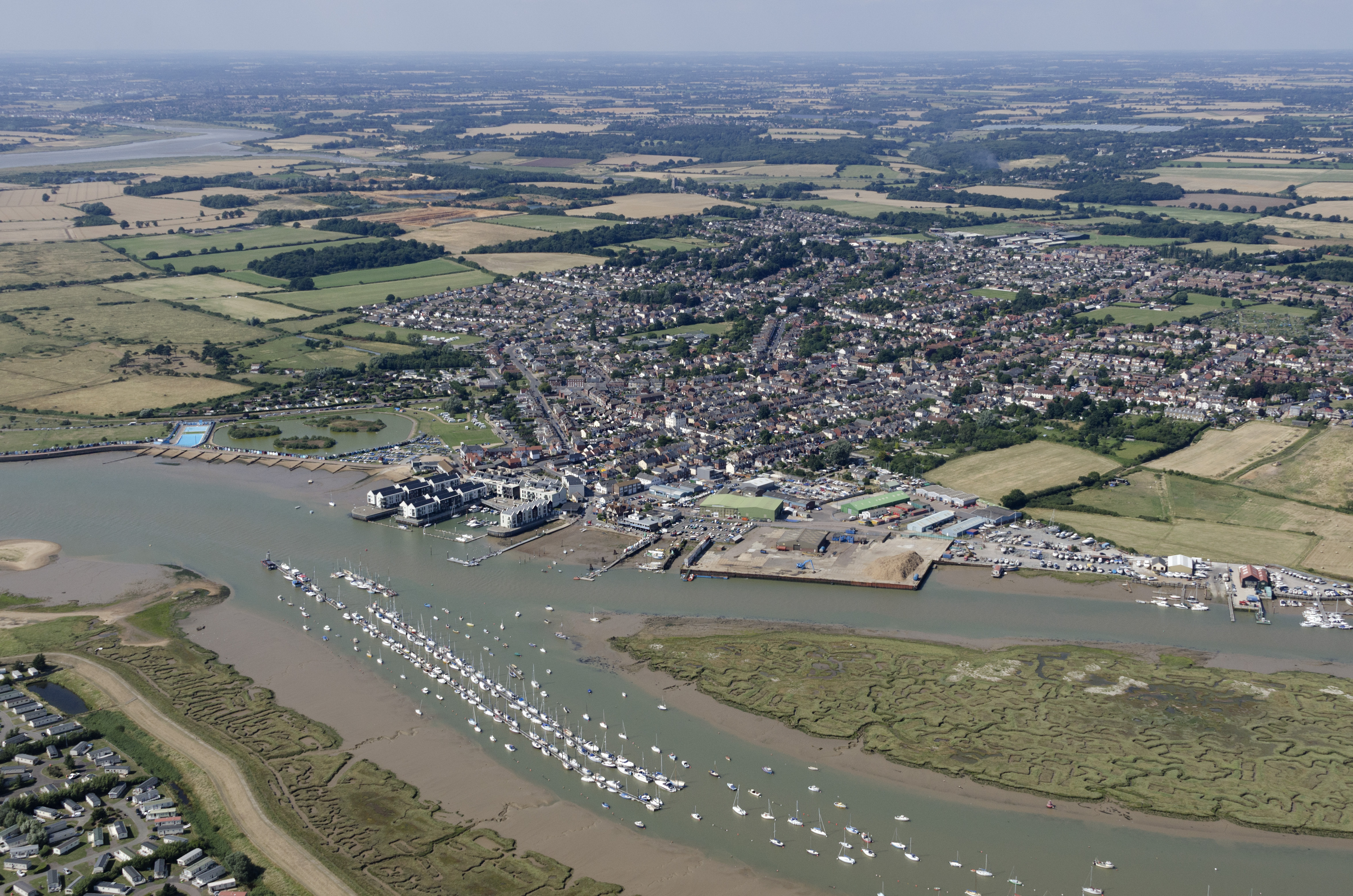
- Brightlingsea and harbour

- Location within Essex
- Population: 8,680 (Parish, 2021)
- OS grid reference: TM087168
- Civil parish: Brightlingsea
- District: Tendring
- Shire county: Essex
- Region: East
- Country: England
- Sovereign state: United Kingdom
- Post town: COLCHESTER
- Postcode district: CO7
- Dialling code: 01206
- Police: Essex
- Fire: Essex
- Ambulance: East of England
- UK Parliament: Harwich and North Essex

Brightlingsea (/ˈbraɪtlɪŋsi/, traditionally /ˈbrɪtəlzi/, /ˈbrɪk-/, /-si/) is a coastal town and civil parish in the Tendring district of Essex, England. It is situated between Colchester and Clacton-on-Sea, at the mouth of the River Colne, on Brightlingsea Creek. The town is an active though small port. At the 2021 census the parish had a population of 8,680.

Its traditional industries included fishery (with a renowned oyster fishery) and shipbuilding. With the decline of these industries, the town is largely a dormitory town for Colchester.

Brightlingsea is a limb of Sandwich, one of the Cinque Ports. The town retains an active ceremonial connection with the Cinque Ports, electing a Deputy from a guild of Freemen.

Brightlingsea was for many years twinned with French oyster fishery port Marennes, Charente-Maritime, but the relationship fell into disuse. In the mid-1990s, the port of Brightlingsea was used for the export of live animals for slaughter, leading to a protest campaign dubbed The Battle of Brightlingsea.

== History ==
=== Earliest remains ===
Brightlingsea sits on a promontory surrounded by the River Colne and its associated marshes and creeks (it was an island until the 16th century), and was settled from an early date. In 1995, an Early Neolithic pot, dated 4000 to 3100 BC, was found in a D-shaped enclosure with a ditch on a farm near Brightlingsea. Other early remains in the area date from the Bronze Age, Roman and Saxon periods.

=== Toponymy ===
The place-name ‘Brightlingsea’ is first attested in the Domesday Book of 1086, where it appears as Brictriceseia. It appears as Brichtricheseye in the Red Book of the Exchequer in 1212, as Brihtlenggesseya in the Pipe rolls in 1230, and as Brychtlingeseye in the charter rolls in 1253.

The name means Brihtric’s island or Beorhtric's island. (See Eilert Ekwall, The Concise Oxford Dictionary of English Place-names, p. 65.)

=== The Middle Ages ===
In the Domesday Book of 1086, the population of Brightlingsea was given as 24 villagers, 26 smallholders and 5 slaves. The Lord of the manor had been King Harold Godwinson, but the title had passed to King William I. The medieval town grew up around two centres: the first around the parish church and the second close to the shore where a port had developed. Trade was in oysters, fish, and copperas – a green pigment of iron (II) sulphate used locally in brick production.

=== The Cinque Port liberty ===
The Cinque Ports were a confederation of the five most important ports on the coast of the English Channel. They had obligations to provide ships and men to fight for the king in times of war for which they were compensated by lucrative exemptions from taxation. All of the Cinque Ports acquired limbs or subsidiary ports that would ease the burden of their wartime obligations and share the benefits of their privileges. Brightlingsea became a limb of the head port of Sandwich, and is the only community outside Kent and Sussex that has any connection with the Confederation of the Cinque Ports. Although these days it is a purely ceremonial affair, every year at the parish church on the first Monday after Saint Andrew's Day, known as Choosing Day, the Freemen of Brightlingsea gather to elect the Deputy of Brightlingsea who is the representative of the Mayor of Sandwich in the Liberty.

=== Wars against France (1793–1815) ===
During the wars against Revolutionary and Napoleonic France Brightlingsea was a base for the men and boats of the Essex Sea Fencibles (1798-1810), though in 1809 they disgraced themselves by pirating oysters from the River Crouch. During the 1803-1804 invasion scare, a naval gun brig and small gunboat were based in Brightlingsea Creek. Between 1804–1808 Warren's Shipyard built 11 gun brigs for the Navy, and in 1809 the first East Coast Martello Tower was completed on The Stone opposite Brightlingsea at Point Clear which now hosts East Essex Aviation Museum.

=== The Church of New Jerusalem ===
Brightlingsea was one of the first places outside the major towns to have a chapel for the doctrines of the Swedish religious mystic Emanuel Swedenborg. Its New Church community dates from 1808. Its first chapel was built in 1814 in what is now New Street and is now a private house. Its second dates from the 1860s and is in Queen Street. Several local oyster merchants and shopkeepers were early members of the New Church, but the most unusual among them was the former naval lieutenant George Beazeley, an illegitimate son of the Russian ambassador. He lived with his first wife, the daughter of the church's joint founder, Dr. Moses Fletcher, in Anchor Cottage, also in Queen Street.

=== Maritime history ===
==== The Mignonette and cannibalism ====
In 1867 the yacht Mignonette was built by Aldous Successors in Brightlingsea. The Mignonette foundered on its way to Australia in 1884. In desperation, three of the four shipwrecked crew killed and ate the sickest member, the seventeen-year-old cabin boy named Richard Parker. The subsequent trial, R. v. Dudley and Stephens, established the common law principle that necessity is not a valid defence against a charge of murder.

==== Fishing ====
By the 1790s Brightlingsea was a busy fishing port, with oyster beds along the Creek and many smacks, each of about 20-30 tons. By the mid-19th century it had more advertised oyster merchants than anywhere else in England. Their boats went as far as Northern Holland and the Channel Islands. Many Brightlingsea fishermen were drowned, especially on the Dutch coast; their names are recorded in the frieze of tiles inside All Saints' Church. 100 fishing vessels were registered at Brightlingsea in 1914, and 54 in 1939. A combination of wars, changing dietary tastes, shellfish health scares, and easier employment caused the local industry to go into sharp decline. No more oysters were bred after 1963, and by the 1980s there were only 4 fishing boats based in the Creek.

==== Yachting ====
Between 1860 and 1939 Brightlingsea was the winter laying-up and repair station for many large steam yachts owned by the wealthy. In addition many local men skippered famous racing sailing yachts, such as Captains Wringe, French, and Sycamore. The wealthy owners dealt with Aldous's Shipyard, which was also the largest builder of fishing smacks on the East Coast and did important work for all 3 armed forces in both world wars. The wealthy patrons included Lipton of the Americas Cup, authors W W Jacobs and Arnold Bennett, the musician Sullivan's heir and nephew Herbert Sullivan, and most famously the eccentric, reclusive but generous American millionaire Bayard Brown, whose yacht Valfreya lay in the Colne for almost 30 years. (J Leather: The Northseamen: Brightlingsea Museum Collection: census data: Essex County Standard)

On 8 August 1903 tragedy struck the area when 8 crew of the SY Lorena plus one local man lost their lives, drowning whilst rowing a tiny stolen rowing boat back to the yacht at 11pm after an evening of heavy drinking. All are buried in the Hillside graveyard. The yacht was owned my the American millionaire Amzi L. Barber.

The Shipyards

In 1934 the shut-down Aldous Shipyard, next to the Hard, was reopened by the Wild family, as Aldous Successors Ltd, and built, repaired and laid up numerous craft, both civilian and military, until closure in 1962. The smaller James and Stone yards merged into a single concern in 1942 and closed in 1989. The yards were by far the town's biggest employers, with a total workforce of about 800 in World War 2. The Aldous site now houses boat-hire and other businesses, while James & Stone has been turned into flats and boat marina.

=== World Wars ===
During the Great War, the Royal Navy maintained a naval base in the town (HMS Wallaroo, later HMS City of Perth), from where it installed, guarded, and maintained the booms and nets protecting the Swin Anchorage. The anchorage was periodically used by a squadron of battleships, including HMS Dreadnought, and served as the launchpad for the raid on Zeebrugge and Ostend in 1918. Brightingsea also provided an army engineer training facility from 1916 to 1919 when it hosted the training of all ANZAC field engineers sent to the Western Front.

Brightlingsea naval base played a significant role in the early sea war of the Second World War when it was the home port for a small group of experimental magnetic minesweepers and a mine recovery party. Following the Dunkirk evacuation, the base was commissioned as flagship HMS Nemo and its functions were expanded to include coastal patrolling duties, air-sea rescue, and a Combined Operations boat base, which for a time hosted Commando units.

From 1941, local shipyards equipped and repaired motor torpedo boats, motor gunboats, and motor launches for the Royal Navy's Coastal Forces. Between 1942 and 1944 areas of Brightlingsea Creek and Point Clear formed a large landing craft training area. Local shipyards concurrently built small craft for the Royal Navy and RAF, and thousands of pontoons for the British Army.

On 9 January 1941 at 23:00 a single German bomber dropped a single large bomb that missed Aldous Successors' shipyards by some 50 meters only to destroy four terraced houses and damage eight more in Tower Street. No one was killed but two people were seriously injured with a further twelve suffering slight injuries. A party from HMS Nemo, led by Lt.Ashton, helped rescue victims from the rubble. An elderly lady later died due to "bomb shock" after being removed from the rubble. After the war, numbers 87-105 Tower Street were rebuilt. On 22 March 1941 a raid by Messerschmitt Bf 109 fighter-bombers killed two men working on the minesweeping drifter Jeannie Leask in the Aldous yard.

Local war heroes included the Merchant Navy officer Leslie Frost and the fighter pilot Roy Whitehead, who both lost their lives.

=== Battles of Brightlingsea ===
In 1984 Brightlingsea Wharf was used to import coal during the Miners' Strike, and up to a dozen ships could be seen out in the river waiting to unload at Wivenhoe. Kent miners came to picket and some were detained by Essex Police.

Brightlingsea port came to national prominence again in the 1990s with an attempt to use the port again for a controversial cargo. Dubbed the "Battle of Brightlingsea" it comprised a series of protests against the live export of animals from the town for slaughter in mainland Europe. Many people believed that the conditions in which the animals were exported were cruel and inhumane. The protest began on 16 January 1995 and ended on 25 October 1995. During this nine-month period, over 150 convoys passed through the town and 250,000 animals were exported; of these, 24 died, 28 were destroyed by the M.A.F.F., and 38 could not be exported. 598 people were arrested by the police, of whom 421 were local residents. The campaigners' claimed victory as live exports ceased, although a looming ban on the export of British beef connected to the outbreak of Mad Cow disease (BSE) in Great Britain and the related drop in demand for British beef products is a more likely cause of the cessation.

== Landmarks ==
=== All Saints' Church ===
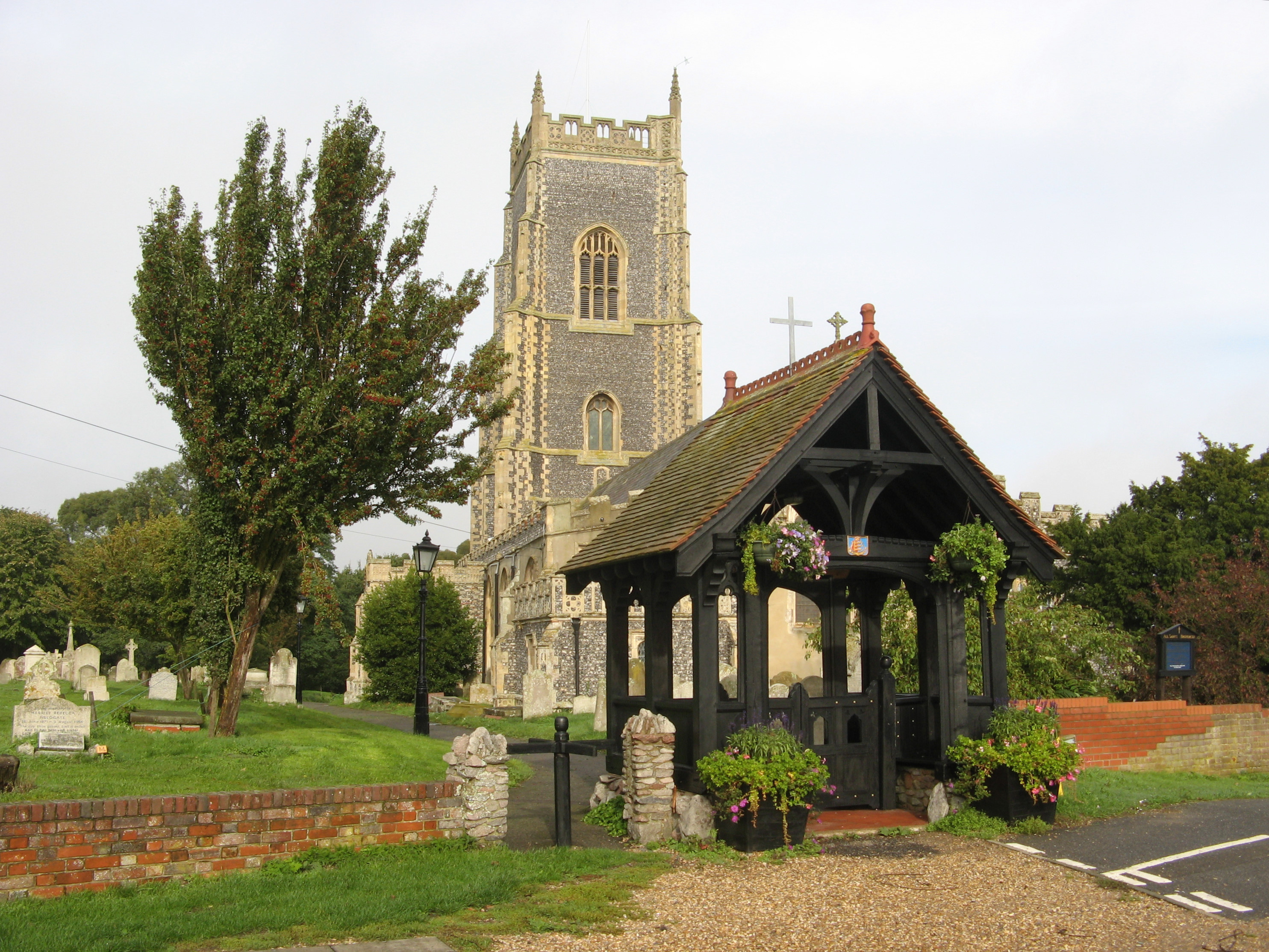
All Saints' Church

The ancient parish church of Brightlingsea stands on a hill at the northern edge of the town. The earliest surviving parts of the building, the chancel, the north and south chapels, and the eastern end of the nave and aisles, date from the 13th century. Further additions were made in the 15th century including the four-storey tower, which was completed around 1490. The church contains a number of monuments dating from the 13th to the 19th centuries. Most notable is a band of 211 square memorial tiles dating from 1872 to 1973; each tile records a Brightlingsea person who has died at sea. A marine chart dated 1590 gives Brightlingsea Church as a navigation mark. It is a Grade I listed building.

=== Bateman's Tower ===
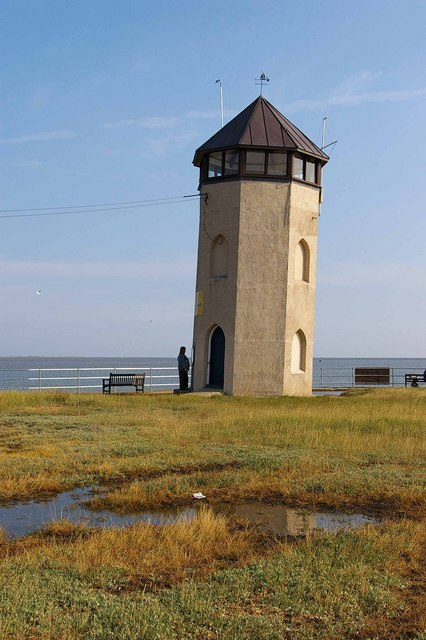
Bateman's Tower – is it or is it not leaning?

Bateman's tower was built in 1883 by John Bateman which he used as a folly for his daughter to recuperate from consumption; however it may have been intended as a lighthouse as part of a failed plan to expand the port. The tower is sited on Westmarsh point at the entrance to Brightlingsea Creek on the River Colne, and is often mistaken for a Martello Tower. During the Second World War the original roof of the folly was removed so that the tower could be used as an observation post by the Royal Observer Corps. In 2005, a restoration project funded by The Heritage Lottery Fund took place to restore the tower to its original condition, including the fitting of a replica of the original roof, refurbishing the interior of the tower and also painting the outside. The tower is now used by the Colne Yacht Club to administer races. Bateman's Tower is leaning slightly; it is said that its foundations were laid on bundles of faggots. It is a Grade II listed building.

=== Brightlingsea Open Air Swimming Pool ===
Brightlingsea open-air swimming pool was built in 1933 and is one of the few remaining lidos (open-air swimming pools built mainly in the art-deco period) still in use in the UK. Brightlingsea Lido was originally a single saltwater pool but was converted into two, a 50m swimmers pool and a shallower baby pool c1970's. It is a non-heated freshwater facility.

== Governance ==
There are three tiers of local government covering Brightlingsea, at parish (town), district and county level: Brightlingsea Town Council, Tendring District Council, and Essex County Council. The town council is based at the Parish Hall on Victoria Place.

=== Administrative history ===
Brightlingsea was an ancient parish in the Tendring Hundred of Essex. When elected parish and district councils were established under the Local Government Act 1894, Brightlingsea was initially given a parish council and included in the Tendring Rural District. Shortly afterwards, in 1896, the parish was converted into an urban district.

Brightlingsea Urban District was abolished in 1974. The area became part of the new district of Tendring. A successor parish called Brightlingsea was created covering the area of the former urban district, with its parish council taking the name Brightlingsea Town Council.

== Transport ==
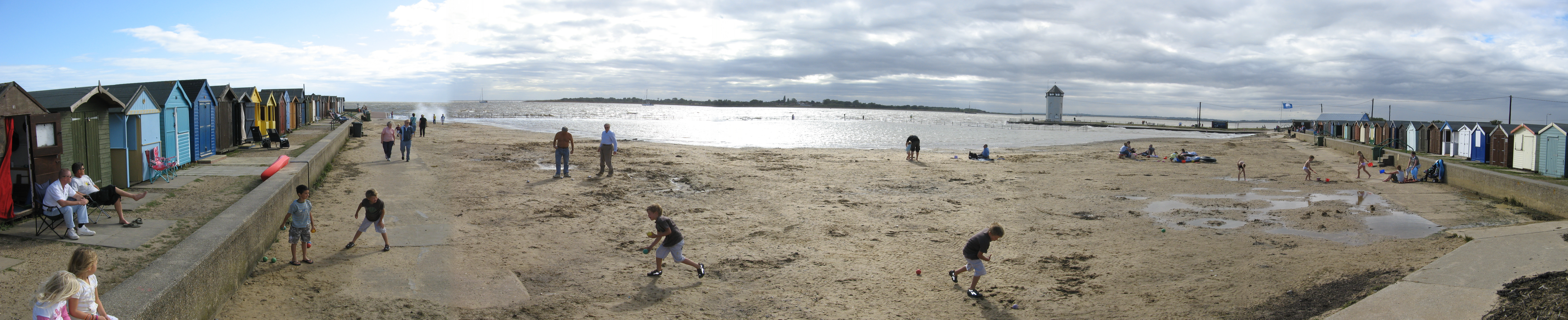
Beach at end of Western Promenade with Bateman's Tower in distance

The Wivenhoe and Brightlingsea Railway opened in 1866 and was a branch line that operated rail services from the nearby town of Wivenhoe into the town centre of Brightlingsea.

The service fell victim to the Beeching cuts in the 1960s and was eventually axed in 1964 supposedly prompted by the high maintenance costs of the swing bridge over Alresford Creek, which was necessary to allow boat traffic to the many sand and gravel pits in the area. Subsequently, the swing bridge was removed and today (December 2020) only the stone supports survive.

Brightlingsea railway station was located on the southern side of Lower Park Road where the town's community centre now sits. It stayed in place for four years after the railway's closure until it was destroyed by fire in 1968.

Being almost totally surrounded by the Colne Estuary, Brightlingsea Creek & salt marsh, Brightlingsea's road links are unusually limited for a town of its size, with only one road linking the town with the outside. During the North Sea Flood of 1953 Brightlingsea was cut off from the outside, though the town itself was not as severely affected as some neighbouring communities.

=== Brightlingsea to Alresford ===
In 2007, one of twenty reserve schemes of Sustrans's Connect2 scheme was a new swing bridge over Alresford Creek. This could give an alternative crossing over the waters around Brightlingsea but by December 2020 no further plans or funding were apparent, whilst Alresford Creek is mooring for fifty pleasure yachts.

== Education ==
Brightlingsea is home to the Colne Community School, a secondary school which serves an extended catchment area which includes Wivenhoe, Alresford, Great Bentley, Thorrington as well as Brightlingsea itself. Ex-principal Terry Creissen, who now resides in Qatar with his family, was honoured (whilst still in the position of headmaster at the Colne) with an OBE. The next Principal of the Colne Community School, Nardeep Sharma, was also awarded an OBE in 2016.

== Media ==
Local news and television programmes are provided by BBC East and ITV Anglia. Television signals are received from the Sudbury TV transmitter. Local radio stations are BBC Essex, Heart East, Greatest Hits Radio East (formerly Dream 100), Actual Radio, and Colne Radio, a community based station. The town is served by the local newspapers, Brightlingsea Info, Colchester Gazette and Essex County Standard.

== Sports ==
Brightlingsea Sailing Club runs a competitive sailing programme and has produced many champions at international and Olympic level. Colne Yacht Club is one of the oldest established clubs on the East Coast, with its origins stretching back to the 1870s.

Brightlingsea Regent Football Club plays its matches at North Road in the Isthmian League.

Brightlingsea Cricket Club. Cricket club playing in the Two Counties Cricket League and the North Essex Cricket League, with a thriving junior kwik cricket and colts section. All home games played at Bayard Recreation Ground

The Brightlingsea Rugby Club, play their home games at Strangers Corner.

== Notable residents ==
- Reginald White and John Osborn, 1976 Olympic gold medallists in the Tornado catamaran sailing class, both awarded MBEs in 1997
