= Thomas Dyke (Seaford MP) =

17th Century English Politician

Sir Thomas Dyke (10 December 1619 – 13 December 1669) was an English politician who sat in the House of Commons from 1660 to 1666.

Dyke was born at Ninfield, Sussex, the son of Thomas Dyke of Horsham, Waldron, Sussex. He was admitted at St John's College, Cambridge on 29 April 1635 aged 16. In 1636, he was admitted at Inner Temple. He was knighted on 19 June 1641.

In 1660, Dyke was elected Member of Parliament for Seaford in the Convention Parliament. He was re-elected MP for Seaford in 1661 for the Cavalier Parliament and sat until his death at the age of 50 in 1669.
