= Philip Morant School and College =

Location
- Rembrandt Way; Colchester, Essex, CO3 4QS; England; 51°52′53″N 0°52′18″E

Information
- Type: Academy
- Motto: "Hold fast to that which is good"
- Established: 1965
- Department for Education URN: 146794 Tables
- Ofsted: Reports
- Chair of Governors: Lorna Kean
- Executive Headteacher: Scott Holder
- Gender: Coeducational
- Age: 11 to 18
- Enrolment: 1,775
- Houses: Attenborough, Parks, Farah, Keller
- Colour: Dark green
- Website: https://pmsc.school/

Philip Morant School and College (originally known as Norman Way School) is a secondary school and sixth form with academy status located within the Prettygate suburb of Colchester, Essex. The school is named after Philip Morant, a local 18th-century historian and archaeologist who was chosen as the school's eponym a few months after its achieving technology college status in 1994. In November 2011 the school became an academy. Philip Morant School joined the Sigma Trust in 2018, moving from the then defunct Thrive Partnership, which it co-founded.

== History ==
The school was founded in September 1965 as a comprehensive secondary school and for the first two years it was in the Greyfriars area of Colchester where it only took on first and second year pupils (Years 7 and 8). During this time the current House Block, Hall and Gym were built in Prettygate. Thereafter the school expanded in several stages but the main work took place in 1974 and 2003. In 1993 the school became a specialised Technology College and in 1996 a sixth-form college was added to the school. The school converted to academy status in 2011 but continues to have technology as a specialism.

=== Philip Morant ===
Philip Morant was born in 1700 and died in 1770. Morant's most notable work is the detailed History of Essex, which remains a standard work of reference. A copy of his History, in two volumes dated 1768, is on permanent loan to the School by the Essex Archaeological Society.

==== Badge ====
The school badge is surrounded by a design of brickwork as a reminder of the parish (St Marys-at-the-Walls) in which Morant lived and worked for over thirty years and in which the school stands. The quartering of the badge is formed by the representation of a cross signifying both Morant's work as a churchman and also the School's spiritual life. The emblems in the quarters are:

- A crown from the arms of the Borough of Colchester (on which the crown of the Three Kings appear to commemorate the work of Helena, patron saint of Colchester).
- A torch, to signify learning and endeavour in games and sports.
- A chevron (part of the arms of the Morant family)
- An open book (both to commemorate Morant's great interest and achievements in the field of history and to represent the academia within the school)

During Ms Hutley's tenure as headteacher, the motto was briefly changed to "Aspiration, Success, Kindness", which had an associated logo that comprised a circle with a thought box circumscribing the text "ASK".

== Ofsted reports ==
Currently, the school is awaiting an Ofsted inspection since the school left the Thrive Partnership and joined the Sigma Trust.

The most recent inspection under the Thrive Partnership resulted in an “Inadequate” rating from Ofsted (4/4), the lowest rating available.

Since 2001, when the school was described as "Outstanding ... with many excellent features and no significant weaknesses", the school has seen mixed results from the inspections, as shown below:

| Type | Year | Result | | Headteacher |
|---|---|---|---|---|
| Academy | 2023 | 2 | Good | Mrs S Neil |
| Academy | 2018 | 4 | Inadequate | Catherine Hutley (Executive Headteacher) Colin Green & Michele Myers (Acting Headteachers) |
| Academy | 2015 | 2 | Good | Catherine Hutley |
| Academy | 2013 | 3 | Requires Improvement | Roger Abo Henriksen |
| Foundation | 2010 | 2 | Good | Sue Cowans M.Sc. |
| Foundation | 2006 | 3 | Satisfactory | Sue Cowans M.Sc. |
| Foundation | 2001 | "Outstanding" | | Russell Moon |

== Notable alumni ==
- Mark Felton, author and historian
- Neil Foster, professional cricketer
- Jane K Hart, Professor of Physical Geography
- Kirk Martinez, Professor of Electronics and Computer Science
- Amanda Root, actress
- Omar Sowunmi, professional footballer
- Jeremy Spake, television personality
- Connor Wickham, professional footballer

== Controversies ==
=== Planning ===
Norman Way was originally planned in the 1960s to be an inner ring road for Colchester with the "Norman Way School" (and several neighbouring schools) facing onto the road. Instead the metalled road was truncated a short distance before the school for safety reasons, and a footpath set on the original route. The alternative vehicular route requires driving through narrow residential streets. Several times since then the school has applied to have Norman Way extended along part or all of the original route so that pupils and visitors would not have to walk the extra 100m, but each time this was vetoed by the Council after vigorous protests against the increased traffic expected by the local residents.

In the summer of 2009, the school again applied to extend the road through fields in the southern residential area, but this time it was to be linked to a £130m government-funded expansion of the school which would allow it to take on pupils from other two schools. Council policy was set in October 2009 to allow the road extension if it can be proven that the grant is genuinely conditional on the altered road access. In mid-2010 it was announced that there would be no cash for the school expansion from Building Schools for the Future programme. However, Colchester council has not announced that it will halt its road building programme, in spite of local demands to preserve the green space.

In July 2015, the school once again caused controversy when it erected a metal fence across a stretch of the Norman Way footpath without consulting residents.

=== Homework policy ===
In 2016, Catherine Hutley decided to ban traditional homework and take a different approach to out-of-school learning.

At the start of the 2016/2017 academic year, the school implemented their new homework policy: 'Prove It +'. The idea 'Prove It +' was to give students the opportunity to make their own decisions concerning what tasks they complete as a substitute to traditional homework. Students can select tasks from the Prove It + website, and then submit the task to their teacher either using a 'digital postcard' which was sent directly to the member of staff's email inbox, or complete a Prove It + card along with the task completed.

The decision to ban traditional homework has caused mixed views on the idea. There was no consultation with either the teaching staff or parents. Some parents describe the move to ban traditional homework as "creating a generation who will flunk their GCSEs",

In 2018, after declining results, homework was reintroduced by the Acting Headteachers.

== See also ==
- Thrive Partnership
