= Samuel Jeake =

English merchant, nonconformist, antiquary and astrologer

Samuel Jeake (1623–1690), dubbed the Elder to distinguish him from his son, was an English merchant, nonconformist, antiquary and astrologer from Rye, East Sussex, England.

== Life ==
Born at Rye in Sussex, on 9 October 1623, he may have belonged to one of the French Protestant families who settled in the county at the end of the 16th century: the name Jeake, written also Jake, Jaque, Jeakes, and Jacque, does point to a French origin. Samuel's father was a baker. His mother, a pious woman, was daughter of the Rev. John Pearson of Peasmarsh, Sussex; she died 20 November 1639.

In 1640 Samuel severed his connection with the Church of England, and was appointed minister of a conventicle, apparently Baptist. He later became an attorney-at-law at Rye, and in 1651 was made a freeman and common, or town, clerk. This office he resigned, or was deprived of, after the passing of the Corporation Act 1661 excluding dissenters from municipal corporations.

As a sectarian preacher, Jeake frequently clashed with the authorities. He was prosecuted before the privy council in 1681, and his meeting-house was shut up. Next year he was again delated, under the Five Mile Act. Brought to London, he remained there till 1687, when the toleration which James II of England extended to the dissenters enabled him to return to Rye. There he took part in meetings till his death, on 3 October 1690.

Jeake dabbled in alchemy, and made a calculation of his own horoscope. He had a large library, and compiled a catalogue. Remains of a storehouse built by him, and of a horoscope on the front, survived in Mermaid Street, Rye.

== Works ==
Jeake is primarily known for his extensive diaries, which are today considered a valuable historical resource. Jeake also wrote on mathematics, and made the first recorded use of the terms "addend", "cosecant", and "proper fraction".

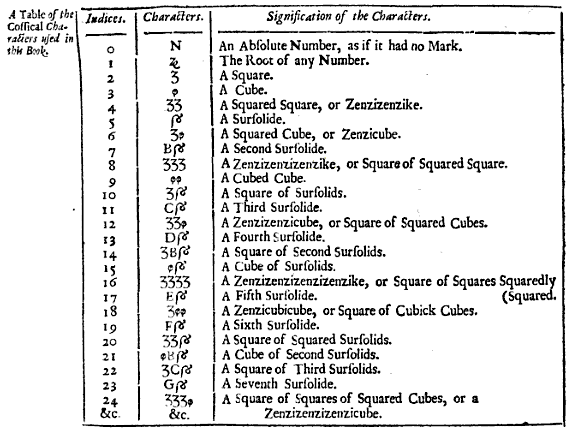
Table of powers from A compleat body of arithmetic, in four books (1701), a work by Samuel Jeake written in 1671

His principal mathematical work was Logisticelogia, or Arithmetick Surveighed and Reviewed published in four books in 1696. This was edited by his son Samuel Jeake, the younger (1652–1699).

Jeake was a nonconformist, but disliked presbyterians as much as the established church; and he spoke contemptuously of the Independents as "Babell, from the differences that have happened among the master-builders". He wrote voluminously on theological controversy, astrology, and antiquarian subjects, but published nothing himself. While town-clerk, he bought a collection of statutes referring to the Cinque ports, which belonged to the borough of Rye. This was the foundation of his major work on The Charters of the Cinque Ports, two Ancient Towns, and their Members. Translated into English, with Annotations, Historical and Critical, thereupon. Wherein divers old Words are explain'd, and some of their ancient Customs and Privileges observ'd, completed in 1678, but not printed until 1728. A translation of Charles II of England's charter to the Cinque ports, published for the mayor and jurats of Hastings (1682), is also attributed to Jeake.

== In literature ==
When Conrad Aiken was London correspondent for The New Yorker, he used the pen name "Samuel Jeake Junior".

== Family ==
In 1651 Jeake married Frances Hartridge of Pembury, Kent, and they had three children, of whom their son Samuel Jeake the Younger survived them.
