= Seaford (constituency) =

Historical British Constituency

- Former cinque Port constituency for the House of Commons

1641–1832
- Seats: Two
- Replaced by: Lewes

The UK parliamentary constituency of Seaford was a Cinque Port constituency, similar to a parliamentary borough, in Seaford, East Sussex. A rotten borough, prone by size to undue influence by a patron, it was disenfranchised in the Reform Act 1832. It was notable for having returned three prime ministers as its members – Henry Pelham, who represented the town from 1717 to 1722, William Pitt the Elder from 1747 to 1754 and George Canning in 1827 – though only Canning was Prime Minister while representing Seaford.

== History ==
=== Enfranchisement and re-establishment ===
Seaford was a Cinque Port constituency, which was technically a separate category although in practice it was to all intents and purposes a parliamentary borough. The Cinque Ports were not under the jurisdiction of the counties in which they stood, and as a result were not represented in the earliest English parliaments because the boroughs were chosen by sheriffs from the towns within their counties. However, Seaford itself was not one of the seven Cinque Ports, and was summoned to send members to the Parliament of 1298 while they – including the much more important town of Hastings of which Seaford was theoretically a subordinate part – remained unrepresented.

Seaford continued to return MPs on an irregular basis for a century, by which time the seven Cinque Ports had also been enfranchised, but ceased to do so after 1399. In 1544, Henry VIII granted the town a charter as a port in its own right, separate from Hastings, but it was another 97 years before its right to elect MPs was restored, by a resolution of the Long Parliament on 4 February 1641. This made it one of the last boroughs to be acquire the right to vote before the Great Reform Act 1832 – only Newark and Durham, enfranchised during the reign of Charles II, came later. The Commons resolution stated that Seaford "shall be restored to that its ancient Privilege of sending Burgesses to Parliament", implying that Seaford was to be regarded as a borough (the representatives of Cinque Ports were referred to as "barons" rather than "burgesses"), but Seaford was nevertheless treated subsequently as a cinque port constituency.

=== Boundaries, franchise and patronage ===
The borough consisted of the parish of Seaford, a small town which had ceased to have much value as a port after the destruction of its harbour by storms at the end of the 16th century. At the time of the Reform Act in 1832, its population was just over 1,000, and the town contained 201 houses.

Like most small boroughs in the Unreformed Parliament, Seaford came under the influence of a series of "patrons" (local magnates who were allowed to choose both the borough's MPs in return for favours to the town and the voters); but, as in the other cinque ports, there was also a powerful government interest, since a large number of the voters were employed as customs and excise officers. From before the end of the 17th century, the Pelham family could generally nominate one of the two MPs. However, the personal influence of the Pelhams became so intertwined with government patronage during the administrations of Henry Pelham and his brother the Duke of Newcastle that Namier argues that when Newcastle went into opposition in 1762 the new government might easily have turned Seaford into a permanent "Treasury borough", had it made efforts to do so.

The right to vote was at first restricted to the freemen of the town, but a decision of the House of Commons after a disputed election in 1671 pronounced that the right to vote extended to "the populacy", which was taken in practice to mean all resident householders paying scot and lot. (This interpretation was re-affirmed by the Commons following another disputed election in 1792.) This was, nevertheless, a restrictive franchise in a town that was not prosperous, and there were only 94 qualified voters in 1831. Indeed, during the 18th century the Duke of Newcastle deliberately restricted the number of voters to those on whose loyalties he could depend, and successfully resisted an election petition in 1761 which would have widened the electorate to include all inhabitants not receiving alms. (This would have enfranchised many poorer voters which the petitioner, defeated candidate George Medley, hoped would be amenable to bribery.) Newcastle's control depended on his having a majority on the town corporation, which was responsible for rating inhabitants for scot and lot and therefore could exclude an inhabitant from voting simply by declaring him not liable to the local tax.

After Newcastle's death the Treasury initially gained complete control of Seaford, but the disfranchisement of the customs officers by Crewe's Act in 1782 reduced the electorate to 24, leaving the majority finely balanced. Throughout the 1780s a struggle for control continued, fought out both through a series of election petitions in the House of Commons and by legal action against the corporation at the quarter sessions. Oldfield, the contemporary historian of electoral abuses, was one of the agents engaged in this contest, and details its course at length. The excluded residents eventually won their right to be rated for scot and lot, and with it their votes, while non-resident honorary freemen created by the corporation were excluded, and the government influence thereafter was minimal.

In the early 19th century the patrons were John Leach and Charles Rose Ellis, who used his influence to occupy one of the seats himself for many years; his elevation to the peerage as Lord Seaford in 1826 may have owed not a little to his commanding a seat in the House of Commons.

=== Abolition ===
Seaford was too small a borough to survive the Reform Act, and lost both its MPs. From 1832, the town was included in the Eastern Sussex county division.

== Members of Parliament ==
Seaford was re-enfranchised by Parliament in 1640

Year	First member	First party	Second member	Second party
1641	Francis Gerard	Parliamentarian	Sir Thomas Parker	Parliamentarian
December 1648	Gerard excluded in Pride's Purge – seat vacant		Parker not recorded as sitting after Pride's Purge	
1653	Seaford was unrepresented in the Barebones Parliament and the First and Second Parliaments of the Protectorate			
January 1659	William Spence		George Parker	
May 1659	Not represented in the restored Rump			
April 1660	Sir Thomas Dyke		George Parker	
1661	Sir Thomas Dyke		Sir William Thomas	
1670	Francis Gratwick		Sir William Thomas	
10 February 1671	Robert Morley		Sir William Thomas	
23 February 1671	Sir Nicholas Pelham		Sir William Thomas	
1679	Herbert Stapley		Sir William Thomas	
1681	Edward Montagu		Edward Selwyn	
1685	Sir William Thomas		Edward Selwyn	
1689	William Campion		Sir Nicholas Pelham	
1690	William Campion		Henry Pelham	
1695	William Campion		William Lowndes	
23 July 1698	Sir William Thomas		William Lowndes	
31 December 1698	William Campion		William Lowndes	
1701	Sir William Thomas		William Lowndes	
27 January 1702	Thomas Chowne		William Lowndes	
21 July 1702	Sir William Thomas		William Lowndes	
1706	George Naylor		William Lowndes	
1710	Thomas Chowne		William Lowndes	
1713	George Naylor		William Lowndes	
1715	George Naylor		Sir William Ashburnham, Bt	
1717	George Naylor		Hon. Henry Pelham	Whig
1722	Sir William Gage, Bt		Sir Philip Yorke	Whig
1734	Sir William Gage, Bt		William Hay	
1744	William Hall Gage		William Hay	
1747	William Pitt	Whig	William Hay	
1754	The Viscount Gage		William Hay	
1755	The Viscount Gage		James Peachey	
1768	The Viscount Gage		George Medley	
13 September 1780	John Durand		John Robinson	
4 December 1780	John Durand		Christopher D'Oyly	
1784	Henry Nevill		Sir Peter Parker, Bt	Tory
1785	Sir John Henderson, Bt	Tory	Sir Peter Parker, Bt	Tory
1786	Henry Flood	Whig	Sir Godfrey Webster, Bt	Whig
1790	John Sargent	Tory	Richard Paul Jodrell	Tory
1792	John Sargent	Tory	John Tarleton	Whig
1794	Richard Paul Jodrell	Tory	John Tarleton	Whig
1796	Charles Ellis	Tory	George Ellis	Tory
1802	Charles Ellis	Tory	Richard Sullivan	Tory
28 July 1806	Charles Ellis	Tory	John Leach	Tory
31 October 1806	George Hibbert	Tory	John Leach	Tory
1812	Charles Ellis	Tory	John Leach	Tory
1816	Charles Ellis	Tory	Sir Charles Cockerell, Bt	Whig
1818	Charles Ellis	Tory	George Watson-Taylor	Tory
1820	Charles Ellis	Tory	George Agar-Ellis	Whig
1826	John Fitzgerald	Tory	Augustus Frederick Ellis	Tory
20 April 1827	John Fitzgerald	Tory	George Canning	Tory
5 September 1827	John Fitzgerald	Tory	Augustus Frederick Ellis	Tory
1831	John Fitzgerald	Tory	William Lyon	Tory
1832	Constituency abolished			

Notes

Parliament of the United Kingdom
Preceded by Newport (Isle of Wight)	Constituency represented by the prime minister 20 April – 8 August 1827	Vacant until 1834 Title next held by Tamworth
