= Northeye =

Medieval village in East Sussex, England

Coordinates: 50.839°N 0.388°E

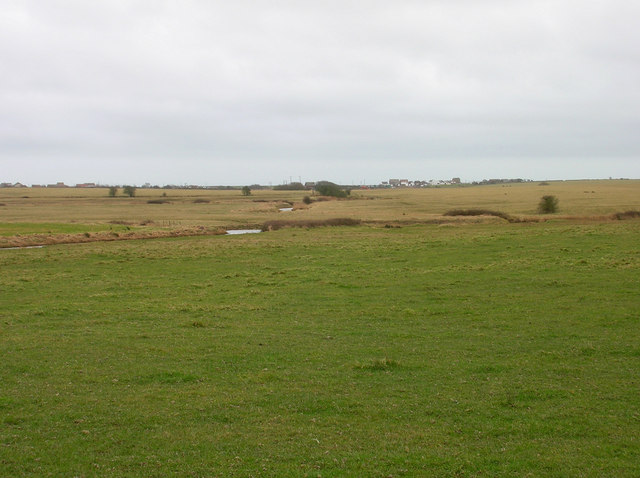
- Site of the medieval village

- Location within East Sussex
- District: Rother
- Shire county: East Sussex
- Region: South East
- Country: England
- Sovereign state: United Kingdom
- Police: Sussex
- Fire: East Sussex
- Ambulance: South East Coast

Northeye is the site of an abandoned medieval village known as Hooe Level on the Pevensey Levels, west of Bexhill-on-Sea. The village is mentioned as a dependent limb of the Cinque Port of Hastings in a charter of 1229. It is thought to have been deserted around 1400 AD. The village consisted of houses and a flint built chapel, The Chapel of St James.

Before the Pevensey Marshes were silted up and reclaimed, Northeye was an island in an inlet that reached inland to Hailsham.
