= Witham =

Town and civil parish in Essex, England

Coordinates: 51.7978°N 0.6373°E

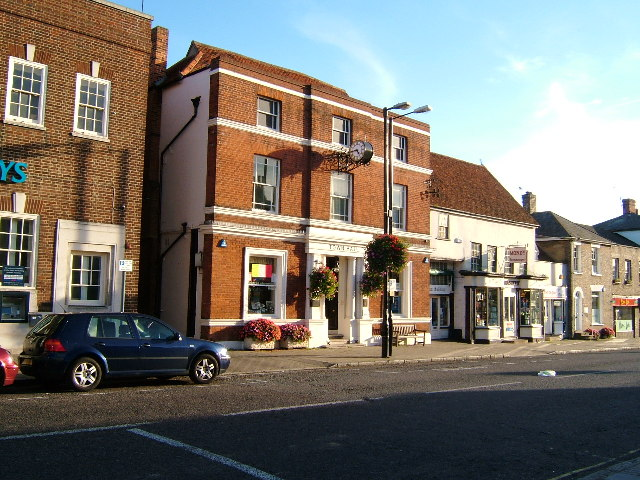
- Witham Town Hall

- Location within Essex
- Population: 27,797 (Parish, 2021); 27,395 (Built up area, 2021)
- OS grid reference: TL821145
- Civil parish: Witham
- District: Braintree
- Shire county: Essex
- Region: East
- Country: England
- Sovereign state: United Kingdom
- Post town: WITHAM
- Postcode district: CM8
- Dialling code: 01376
- Police: Essex
- Fire: Essex
- Ambulance: East of England
- UK Parliament: Witham

Witham (/ˈwɪtəm/) is a town and civil parish in the Braintree district, in the county of Essex, England. It stands on the Roman road between the cities of Chelmsford (8 mi or 13 km south-west) and Colchester (13 mi or 21 km north-east). The River Brain runs through the town and joins the River Blackwater on the outskirts. At the 2021 census the population of the parish was 27,797 and the population of the built up area was 27,395.

== History ==
=== Early history ===
Excavations by Essex County Council Field Archaeological unit at the recent Maltings Lane development discovered evidence of Neolithic occupation at Witham, including human remains and several trackways across ancient marsh. Excavations of the Witham Lodge (Ivy Chimneys) area of the town in the 1970s unveiled remains of a Roman temple as well as a pottery kiln. This would have been alongside the main Roman road from Colchester to London and used as a stopover point on the long journey. Another notable find during the excavation was a votive offering pool in the grounds of the temple, containing several artefacts that would have been offered to the gods.

In 913, according to the Anglo-Saxon Chronicle, Edward the Elder marched from Hertford to reconquer Essex, and encamped in Witham on his route to set up a base at Maldon. Witham's position on the Roman road in relation to the major Viking army based at Colchester was the most likely reason for this, and it would have effectively cut Essex in two.

The place-name Witham is first attested in the Anglo-Saxon Chronicle in 913 (mentioned above), where it appears as Witham. It also appears as Witham in the Domesday Book of 1086. The name may mean 'village in a bend'. Another suggestion is that the name is part Brythonic (probably from a cognate of Gwydd = "Woods" in modern Welsh) and "ham", a very common Saxon village designation.

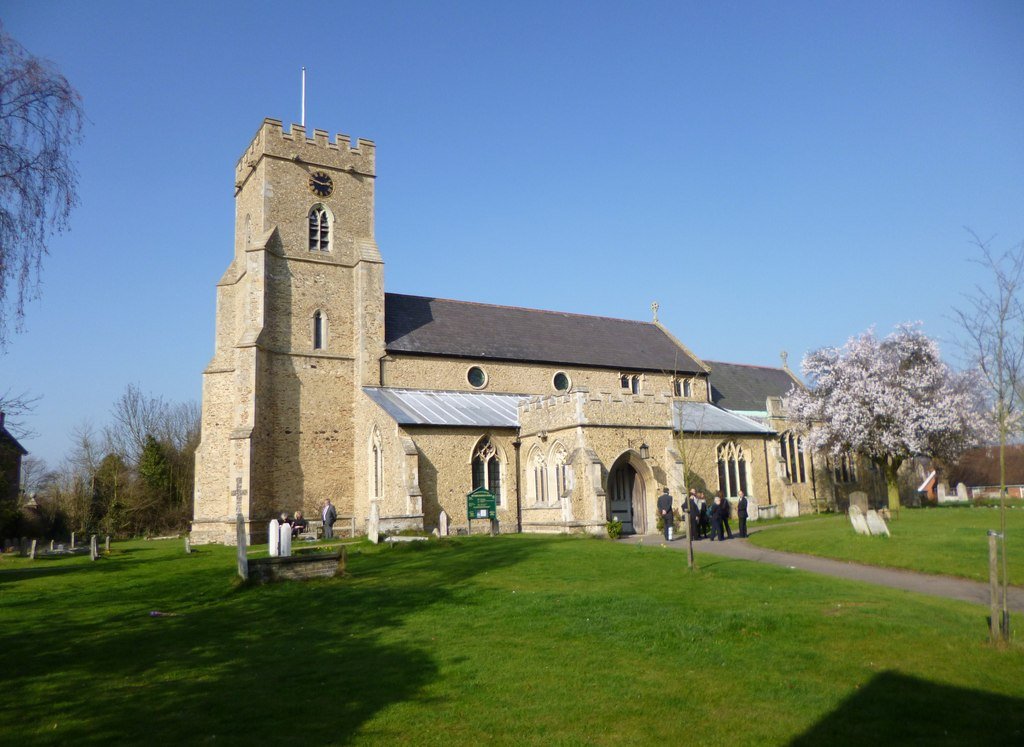
St Nicolas' Church

The Saxon settlement of Witham was centred on Chipping Hill, about 0.5 miles (0.8 km) north of the Roman road. Although a church is not mentioned in the Domesday Book, it is thought there was a church at Witham by that time. The parish church of St Nicolas is at Chipping Hill; it was substantially rebuilt around 1330, retaining fragments of an earlier building.

The manor of Witham was given to the Knights Templar in 1148, supplementing the property at Cressing Temple to the north that they had been granted in 1136. There had been a market at the original settlement at Chipping Hill ("chipping" means a market in Old English). The Knights Templar moved the market to a new location on the Roman road in the mid-12th century.

The manor of Witham passed to the church after the dissolution of the Templars in England in c. 1309. The manor was sold to Sir John Southcott in c. 1575, a prominent judge and politician from Devon. His heirs held the manor for almost two centuries, until 1648 when the Southcott family had their lands destroyed for supporting the royalist cause in the English Civil War.

During the latter half of the 18th century and the early 19th century, Admiral Sir William Luard was the town's most prominent citizen, a resident of Chipping Hill. His funeral cortège through the town in 1910 was witnessed by thousands.

In the 18th century, Witham briefly enjoyed a period as an affluent spa town after the discovery of a mineral-bearing spa by a Dr Taverner. Witham was also a centre of the wool trade until the decline of the industry in the late 17th century.

=== Witham rail crash ===
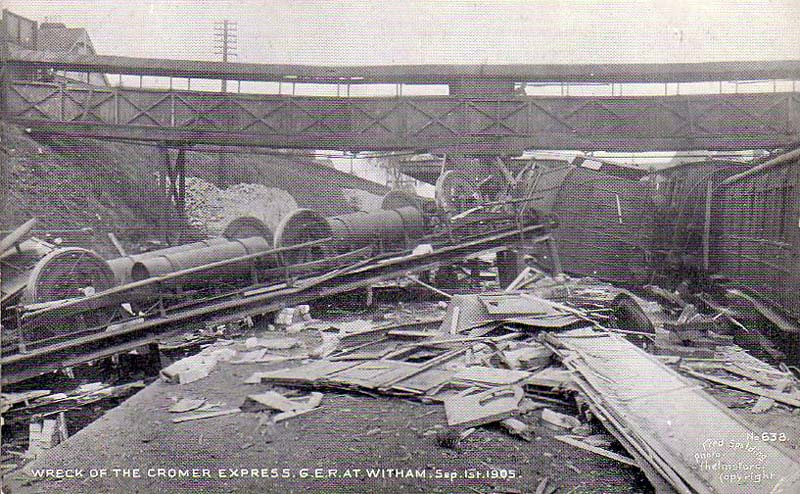
Witham railway station, 1 September 1905

Witham railway station was the scene of a serious accident 09:27 on 1 September 1905. The London Liverpool Street-to-Cromer 14-coach express derailed whilst travelling at speed through the station. Ten passengers and a luggage porter were killed when several of the carriages somersaulted on to the platforms causing considerable damage to the rolling stock and the station. Seventy-one passengers were seriously injured. It remains to this day the worst loss of life in a railway accident in Essex.

In 2005, an opportunity to commemorate the centenary was missed and the incident is now largely forgotten. Ben Sainty, a signalman, whose quick action averted the next train hitting the wreckage, has a road named after him in the town, Ben Sainty Court.

=== 20th and 21st centuries ===
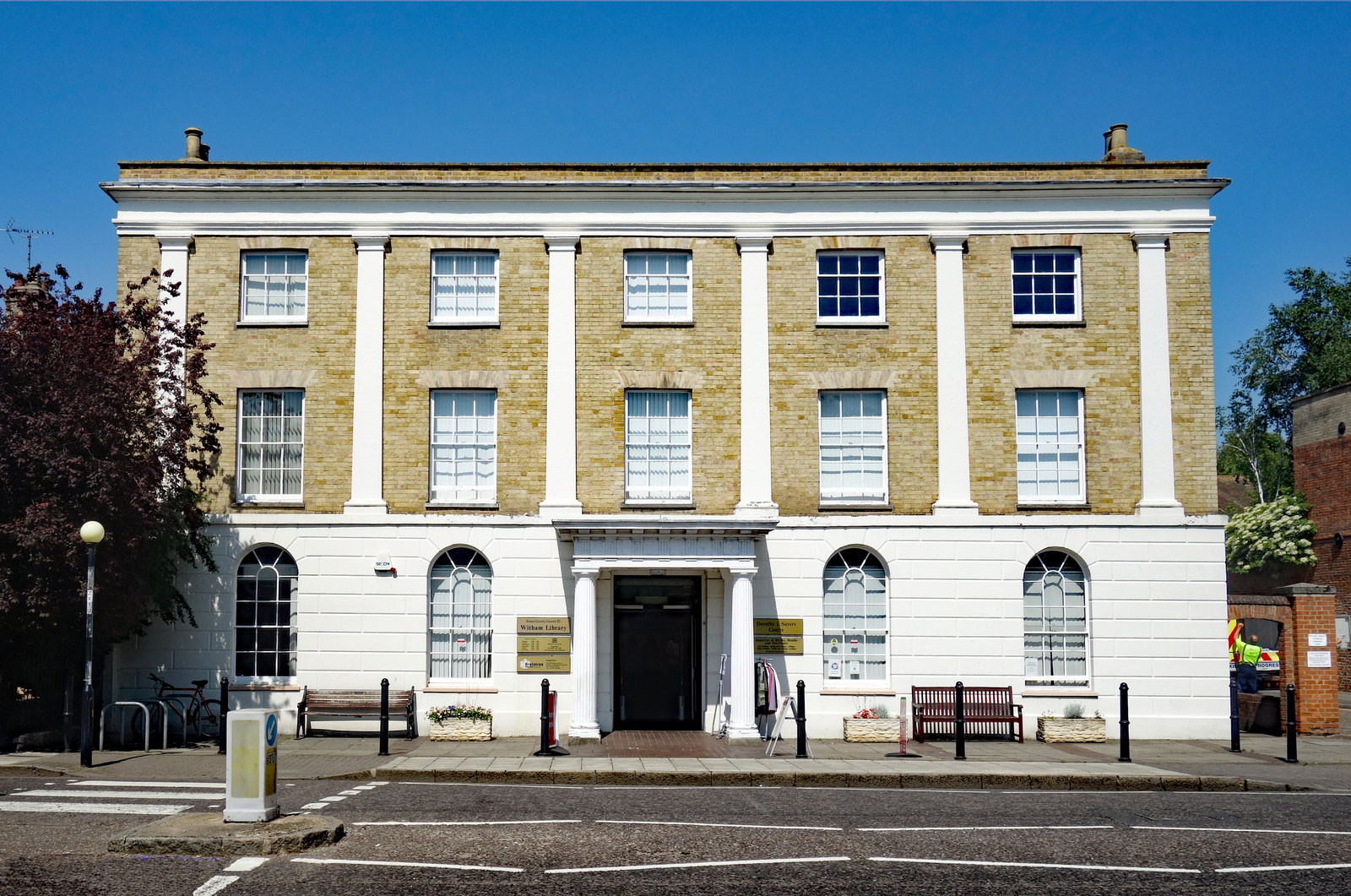
Witham Public Library

The town expanded greatly in the late 1960s and 1970s, when the Greater London Council built three large council estates on the west and north sides of the town, and a smaller one to the south, for families from London to move to as part of the New Town and Expanded Town overspill policy of that time. A famous one-time resident of the town was the author Dorothy L. Sayers, whose statue stands opposite the town's library, which is a short distance from the author's house. The library stands on the site of the old Whitehall cinema, which closed in the late 1970s and which was itself a conversion of the White Hall country house.

Witham has grown in size after the development of the Maltings Lane estate to the south of the town between 2002 and 2003. This was followed, in 2012, by the moving of Chipping Hill Primary School from its old premises in Church Street to a new-build in Owers Road. The development of this area has continued, including the opening of an Aldi superstore in 2015.

Approved developments in this period included the reconstruction of both the town's secondary schools, the New Rickstones Academy and the Maltings Academy, completed in 2011; the Marston's pub and restaurant on Gershwin Boulevard, completed in 2013 with the adjacent Seymour House day nursery; the refurbishment and opening of a Morrisons store in the old premises of the Jack & Jenny pub in 2014; and the newly-built Witham Leisure Centre on Spinks Lane, replacing Bramston Sports Centre, completed in 2014.

== Transport ==
=== Railway ===
The town is served by Witham railway station, situated on the Great Eastern Main Line operated by Greater Anglia. Trains take approximately 40–45 minutes to reach Liverpool Street. The station is also the junction for a branch line to Braintree. Another branch line went from Witham to Maldon, but this has now been dismantled having been closed to passengers in 1964.

=== Roads ===
Witham is situated on the A12 trunk road between Chelmsford and Colchester, and can be accessed via junctions 21 and 22. It was originally a Roman road from London to Colchester. The A12 used to run in a straight line through the middle of the town, but a by-pass now completely avoids the town. The A12’s former route is now called the B1389.

=== Cycling ===
Witham is on National Cycle Route 16.

=== Commuters ===
The town has a large number of residents who commute to work in London because of its excellent transport links. This is evident by Witham railway station's appearance within the 150 busiest railway stations in Great Britain, which would not be expected based on the town's population alone.

== Economy and facilities ==
Witham has a mainly linear town centre, focused on the high street and two shopping precincts to form a cross that bisects the high street; these are the Newlands Shopping Centre of 1970s design to the north and the Grove Centre of a 1980s brick design to the south. There are also a range of small shops, restaurants, pubs, major high-street banks and several national commercial chains. The town also has five supermarkets: Tesco in the Grove Centre, Morrisons near the railway station, Asda on Highfields Road, Aldi at the southern entrance to the town and Lidl that recently opened towards the centre of town on the old Bramston sports centre site.

A significant industrial presence remains in the town, concentrated on three industrial estates on the eastern side of the town close to the junction with the A12. There are also commercial offices located in the town centre area.

In March 2007, Crittall Windows closed its Braintree factory and returned to Witham to occupy a new factory on the Freebournes Industrial Estate. The factory Crittall moved into was built for J.L. French in 2001, but never used for production. The new Crittall factory is visible on the right hand side of the road exiting Witham towards Colchester, via the A12.

In December 2013, the financial service provider Cofunds relocated to the former Marsh building on the Grove, bringing approximately 600 jobs to the town.

== Sport and leisure ==
Witham has a Non-League football club Witham Town F.C. who play at Spa Road.

There is also a rugby club situated behind the football ground.

Witham also has a hockey club formed in 1924 and is now made up of 5 men's teams and 3 women's teams. Witham also participates in the local mixed league as well as the men's and women's summer league and indoor league. Witham hockey club play on the astro turf across the road from Maltings Academy on Spinks Lane. The hockey club share a clubhouse with the cricket club which is situated next to the recreation ground, commonly known as the Maldon Road Park, on Maldon Road.

Leisure facilities include Benton Hall Golf and Country Club, a pool club, and a library which occupies the site of what was the town's long-closed cinema, the Whitehall. A "River Walk" runs for 3 1/2 miles (5.5 kilometres) through the town and is home to a range of wildlife. Witham Leisure Centre is located in Spinks Lane, adjacent to the former Bramston Sports Centre.

Witham is twinned with the town of Waldbröl, Germany.

== Media ==
Local news and television programmes are provided by BBC East and ITV Anglia. Television signals are received from the Sudbury TV transmitter, BBC London and ITV London can also be received from the Crystal Palace TV transmitter. Local radio stations are BBC Essex on 103.5 FM, Heart East on 102.6 FM, Radio Essex on 107.7 FM and Actual Radio on DAB. The town is served by the local newspaper, Braintree and Witham Times which publishes on Wednesdays. The Colchester Gazette also covers the town.

== Education ==
There are two secondary schools in Witham, Maltings Academy and New Rickstones Academy. Maltings Academy achieved 94% A*- C GCSE grades in 2012. (51% including English and Maths) and an above national average of 99% of pupils gaining at least one GCSE in 2012. The two schools are part of the Lift Academies chain. New Rickstones Academy was rated Good by Ofsted in January 2015 and Maltings Academy was rated Outstanding by Ofsted in March 2015.

The town's primary schools are Templars, Holy Family Catholic School, Howbridge, Powers Hall, Chipping Hill (which became a primary school in September 2010), Rivenhall CoE, Elm Hall Primary, Southview, and Silver End Primary. Both Chipping Hill School and Powers Hall Junior School received Outstanding OfSTED reports in 2008.Chipping Hill was named the Top School in East Anglia by the Sunday Times.

The Chatten free school is a special educational needs school which opened in 2021. The school provides up to 75 places to pupils from across Essex with severe, complex autism.

== Governance ==
There are three tiers of local government covering Witham, at parish (town), district, and county level: Witham Town Council, Braintree District Council, and Essex County Council. The town council is based at Witham Town Hall at 61 Newland Street.

For national elections, Witham forms part of the Witham constituency. The Member of Parliament (MP) is the Conservative Priti Patel, who was elected at the 2010 general election, becoming the first Asian female Conservative MP.

=== Administrative history ===
Witham was an ancient parish in the Witham hundred of Essex.

In 1852, the parish was made a local board district, administered by an elected local board. Such districts were reconstituted as urban districts under the Local Government Act 1894. In 1933, the neighbouring parish of Rivenhall (which included Silver End) was abolished and its area absorbed into Witham. At the same time, there were some more minor adjustments to the boundaries with the neighbouring parishes of Faulkbourne and Kelvedon.

Witham Urban District was abolished in 1974 under the Local Government Act 1972, when the area became part of the new Braintree district. Witham was originally planned to be in Maldon district, it was later decided to place it in Braintree district. The area of the pre-1974 urban district became unparished as a result of the 1974 reforms. Three new parishes covering the area of the old urban district were subsequently created in 1982: Witham, Rivenhall, and Silver End. The parish council for Witham adopted the name Witham Town Council.

== Notable residents ==
- Archibald Douglas, Lt-General and 18th-century MP lived in White Hall.
- James Gibson, the 2003 World Breaststroke 50-metre (Long-course) Champion, was born in Chelmsford and lived in Witham.
- Dorothy L. Sayers, translator of Dante's Divina Commedia, and a famous writer of detective fiction, died in Witham in 1957.
- Admiral Sir William Luard, President of the Greenwich Naval College and Admiral of the Fleet.
- John Strutt, 3rd Baron Rayleigh, Nobel Prize–winning physicist for the discovery of argon, died in 1919 at Terling Place, Witham.
- James Winslow, Australian and Asian Formula 3 champion lived in Witham before moving to Australia and then the US to race in Formula Atlantic.
- Graham Hedman, 2006 European Champion, 4 × 400 men's relay, was born in Witham.
- Nadine Lewington who appeared in Holby City between 2007 and 2009 lived in Witham.
- Cody McDonald former Witham Town player, who eventually moved to Norwich City F.C. and then Coventry City F.C.
- Sir John Richard Robinson former editor of the Daily News
- Deta Hedman, English darts player who plays in World Darts Federation events
- Michael Gambon, English actor who played Albus Dumbledore in the Harry Potter film series, died in Witham in 2023
- Olly Murs, English Singer and TV Personality, appeared on The X Factor, lived in Witham
- James Beardwell, Witham Town Football Club superfan, online autism influencer and recipient of the British Empire Medal as part of the Queen's Birthday Honours in 2021. He also appeared on Channel 4's The Undateables in 2015.
