= Silver End =

Village in Essex, England

Coordinates: 51.846967°N 0.626135°E

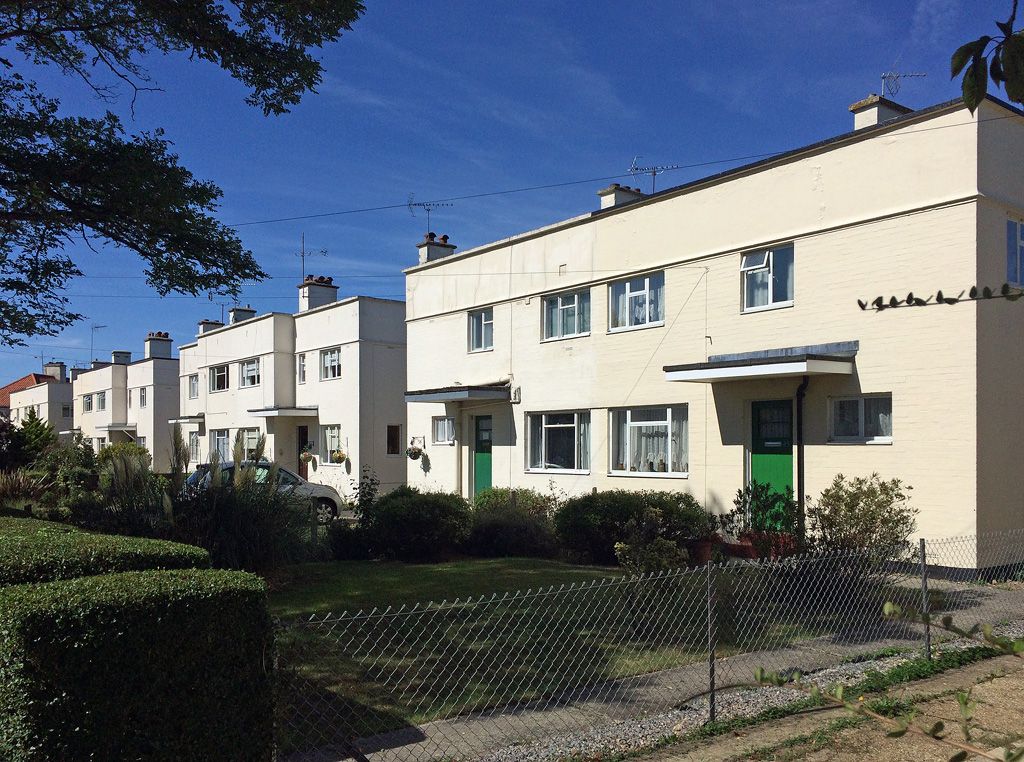
- Houses on Silver Street

- Location within Essex
- Population: 3,914 (Parish, 2021)
- OS grid reference: TL8086719795
- Civil parish: Silver End
- District: Braintree
- Shire county: Essex
- Region: East
- Country: England
- Sovereign state: United Kingdom
- Post town: WITHAM
- Postcode district: CM8
- Dialling code: 01376
- Police: Essex
- Fire: Essex
- Ambulance: East of England
- UK Parliament: Witham
- Website: silverendparishcouncil.gov.uk

Silver End is a village and civil parish between Witham and Braintree, in Essex, England. It was conceived in the 1920s as a model village by the industrialist Francis Henry Crittall, whose works at Braintree manufactured metal windows. At Silver End he established a further Crittall Windows factory and homes for its workers, including residences for its managers designed by Scottish modernist architect Thomas Tait, and ancillary buildings including the largest village hall in Britain.

At the 2021 census the parish had a population of 3,914.

== History ==
Until the 1920s, Silver End was a small hamlet in the parish of Rivenhall, comprising a handful of houses along Western Lane and the Western Arms public house.

Crittall, or "The Guv'nor" as he was known to his workforce, had a vision to provide his workforce with houses and amenities in close proximity to his window factory. Thus over six years from 1926 Silver End village was built. In 1928, a large department store was opened with 26 various departments under one roof. The building burnt down in 1951, but was re-built and now houses the Co-op and adjacent shops.

The village hall boasted a first class dance floor, cinema, library, snooker room and health clinic. It is the largest village hall in the UK.

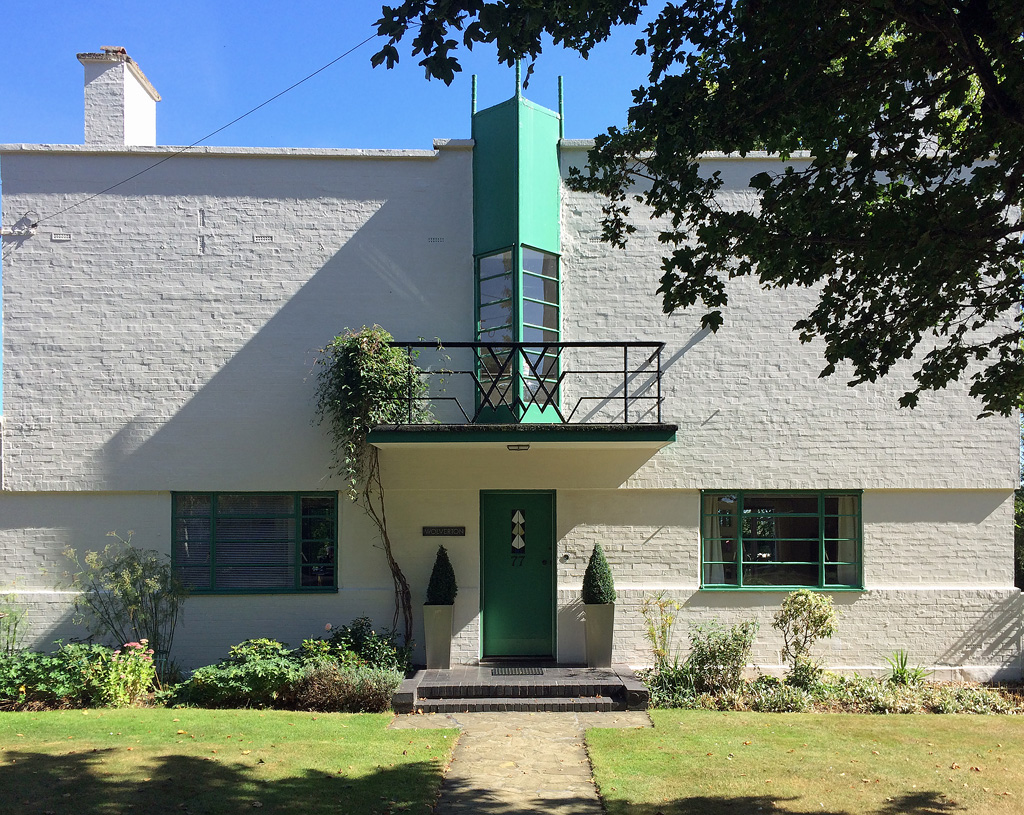
'Wolverton' on Boars Tye Road, a house built c. 1928

The village includes some noteworthy early examples of Modernist architectural design; the distinctive white, flat-roofed houses on Francis Way and Silver Street are the work of Sir John Burnet and Partners. One of those involved in the designs for the village was Scottish architect Thomas S. Tait, a leading designer of Art Deco and Streamline Moderne buildings in the 20th Century who is also credited with designing the concrete pylons on Sydney Harbour Bridge. Although Thomas S. Tait designed Le Chateau, most of the other houses on Silver Street and Craig Angus and Wolverton were designed by Tait's Irish Assistant, Frederick Edward Bradshaw MacManus. Of note are the steel window frames manufactured by Crittall's firm as a test for their use in the damp English climate.

All major production ceased at the original Crittall site in 2006 when the factory was closed down. However, window frames are still manufactured at a Crittall factory in Witham.

== The factory today ==
The majority of the buildings on the original factory site were demolished during the summer of 2008. Although these factory buildings were in the conservation area of the village, none of them were listed for conservation, although the developer agreed to retain the original 1926 factory and the Power House building, which originally generated electricity for the village. These factory buildings, which originally formed part of the intrinsic character of the village and an integral part of its raison d'etre - as a village in which to live and work, in Crittall's original concept - have thus now been lost. Most of the remaining factory buildings have been unused for some while.

There is now little employment within Silver End and it has become essentially a dormitory village. Any new dwelling houses constructed within the conservation area will be subject to the Article 4 Direction (Town and Country Planning Act 1990) which was served in 1983. This effectively removed "Permitted Development" rights for replacement windows, doors, etc., on the dwelling houses in the Conservation Area to prevent further inappropriate alterations.

== Local facilities ==
Silver End has a convenience store and a newsagents. Silver End also has a library, doctor's surgery, pharmacy, dog grooming parlour, Chinese takeaway, fish & chip shop, chicken/pizza takeaway, hairdressers, skate park, two playing fields, football club, tennis court and also is home to a pub and a working persons' club. There are also many social clubs for all ages.

The village has its own primary school. Secondary schools are situated in and around Braintree and Witham; Alec Hunter Academy in Braintree, Maltings Academy and New Rickstones Academy (both in Witham).

In the middle of the conservation area part of the village is the Silver End memorial gardens, consisting of a playground, duck pond, rose garden, double border garden and a climbing wisteria.

Silver End has three churches.

== Governance ==
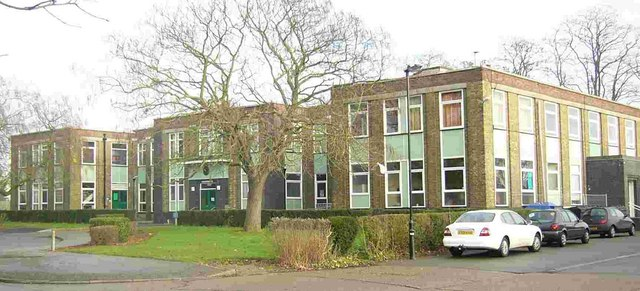
Silver End Village Hall

There are three tiers of local government covering Silver End, at parish, district, and county level: Silver End Parish Council, Braintree District Council, and Essex County Council. The parish council meets at the village hall.

Silver End was historically part of the parish of Rivenhall. In 1933 Rivenhall parish was abolished and its area was absorbed into the urban district of Witham. Witham Urban District was abolished in 1974 under the Local Government Act 1972, when the area became part of the new Braintree district. The area of the pre-1974 urban district became unparished as a result of the 1974 reforms. Three new civil parishes covering the area of the old urban district were subsequently created in 1982: Witham, Rivenhall, and Silver End.

== Transport ==
Silver End is on a direct link by road between Braintree and Witham, which are both within a 10-minute drive.

Stephensons of Essex operate local bus services; the 38 and 38a operate regularly between Halstead, Braintree and Witham. Services were operated traditionally by Eastern National, who had a depot in Silver End between 1963 and 1988.

The nearest railway station to Silver End is White Notley, which is on a branch line between Witham and Braintree. Services operate hourly between Braintree and London Liverpool Street. However, many passengers take the train from Witham instead, for a fast and direct train into London in under 40 minutes.

Witham station is situated on the Great Eastern Main Line. Trains travel directly to Hatfield Peverel, Chelmsford, Romford and Stratford to the south; Kelvedon, Marks Tey, Colchester and Ipswich can be accessed to the north.
