= Rae Featherstone =

Australian architect (1907–1987)

Rae Edwin Featherstone (1907-1987) was an Australian architect best known for serving as staff architect at Melbourne University. His early work with the firm Oakley & Parkes influenced his later stylistic approach, which was firmly rooted in an early modernist style. He worked for Harry Stuart Goodhart-Rendel in Europe as Chief Assistant, after which he returned to Australia, working for Stephenson & Turner, and retaining the right to practice on his own. His work on the house Blue Peter (1956) won him national recognition when it was published in the book Best Houses in Australia. He was then appointed his position of senior lecturer at the University of Melbourne, finally achieving the position of staff architect. He later consulted for the Australian University Commission.

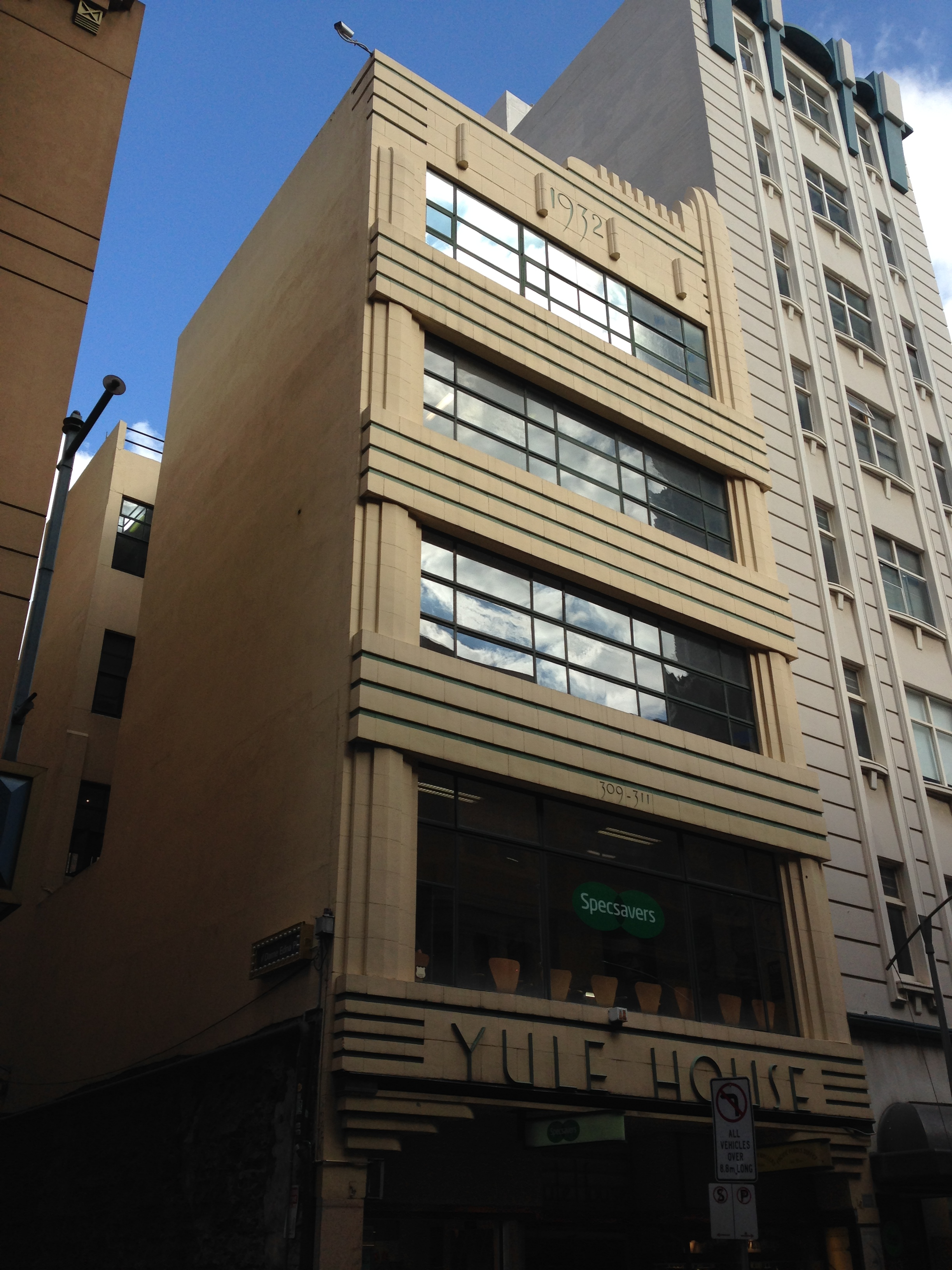
Yule House, 1932

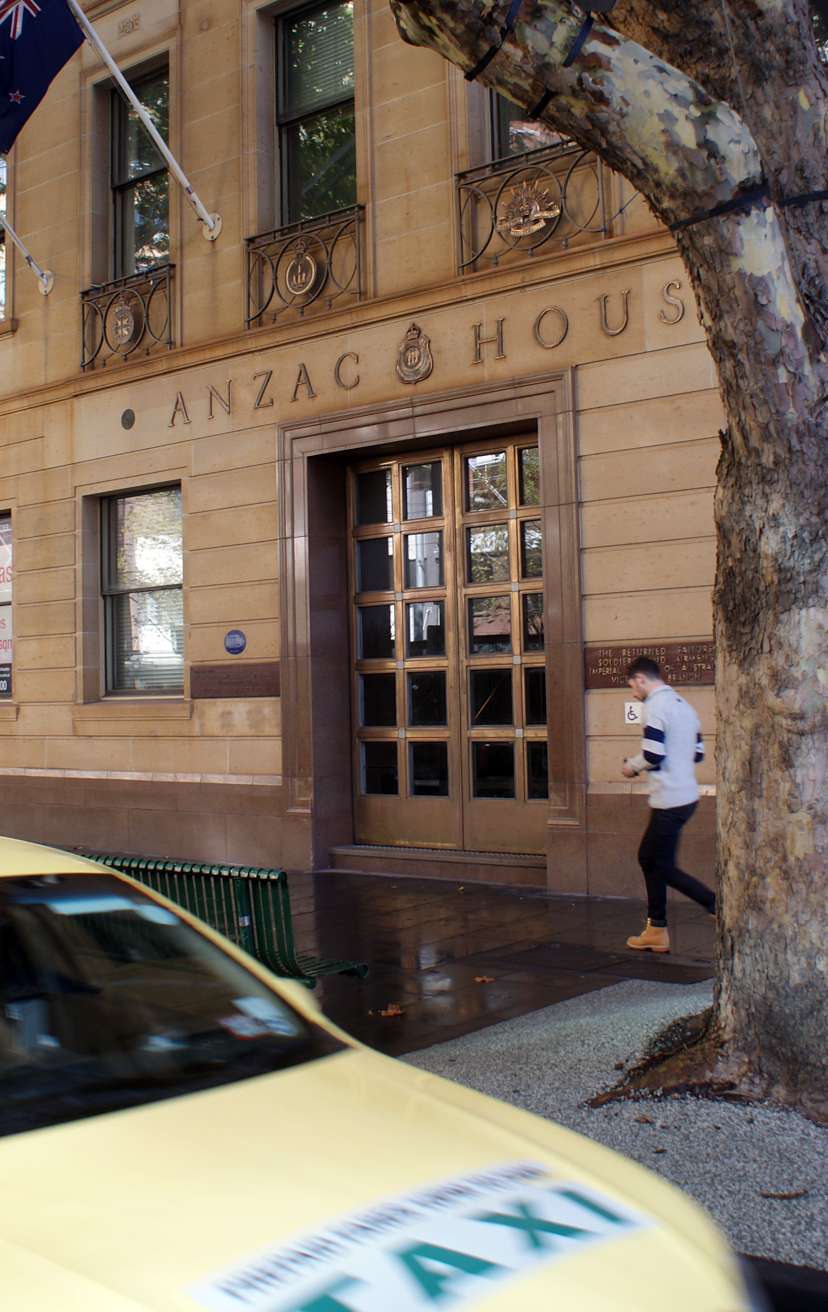
ANZAC House, 1938

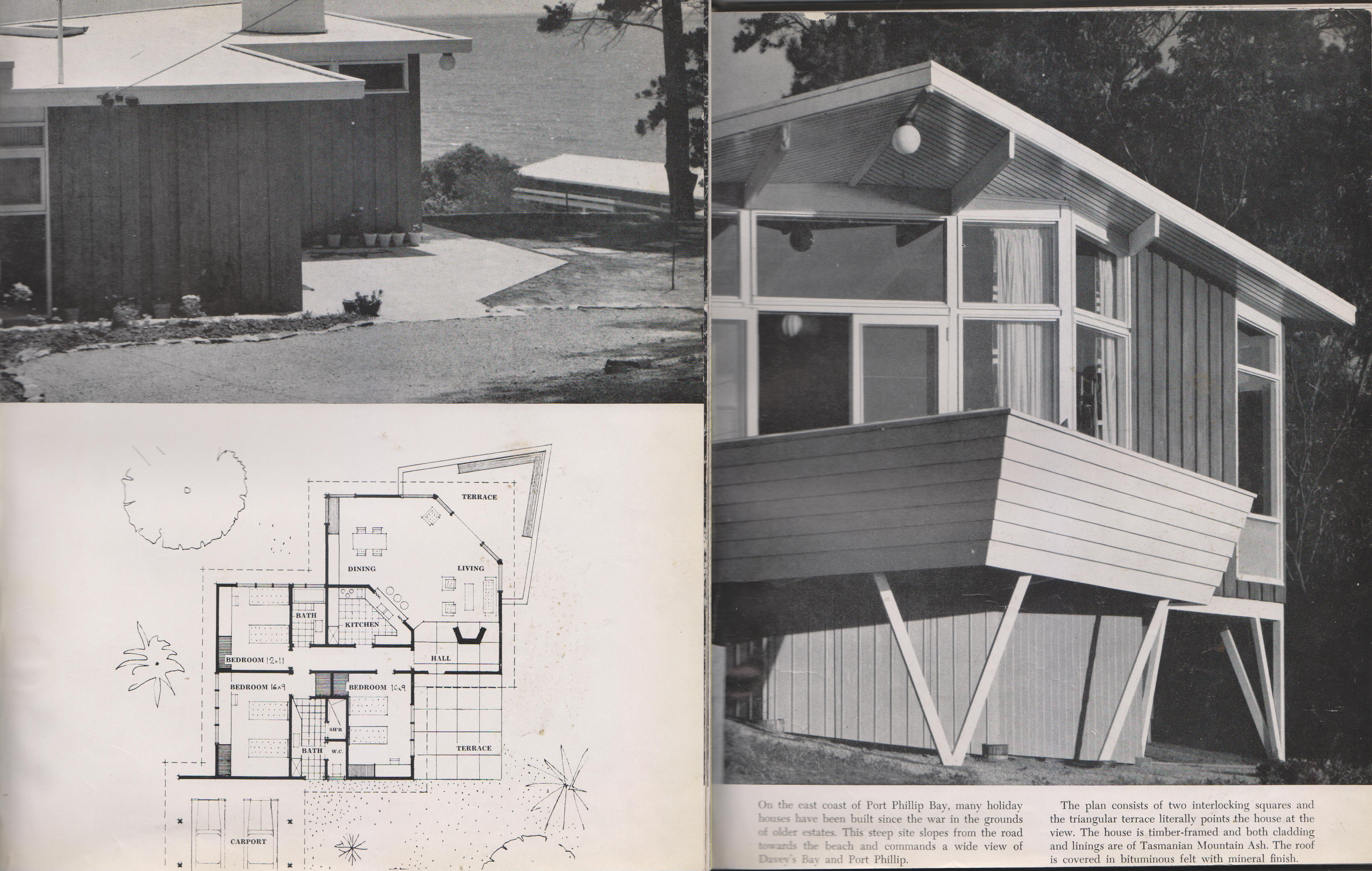
Blue Peter, 1956

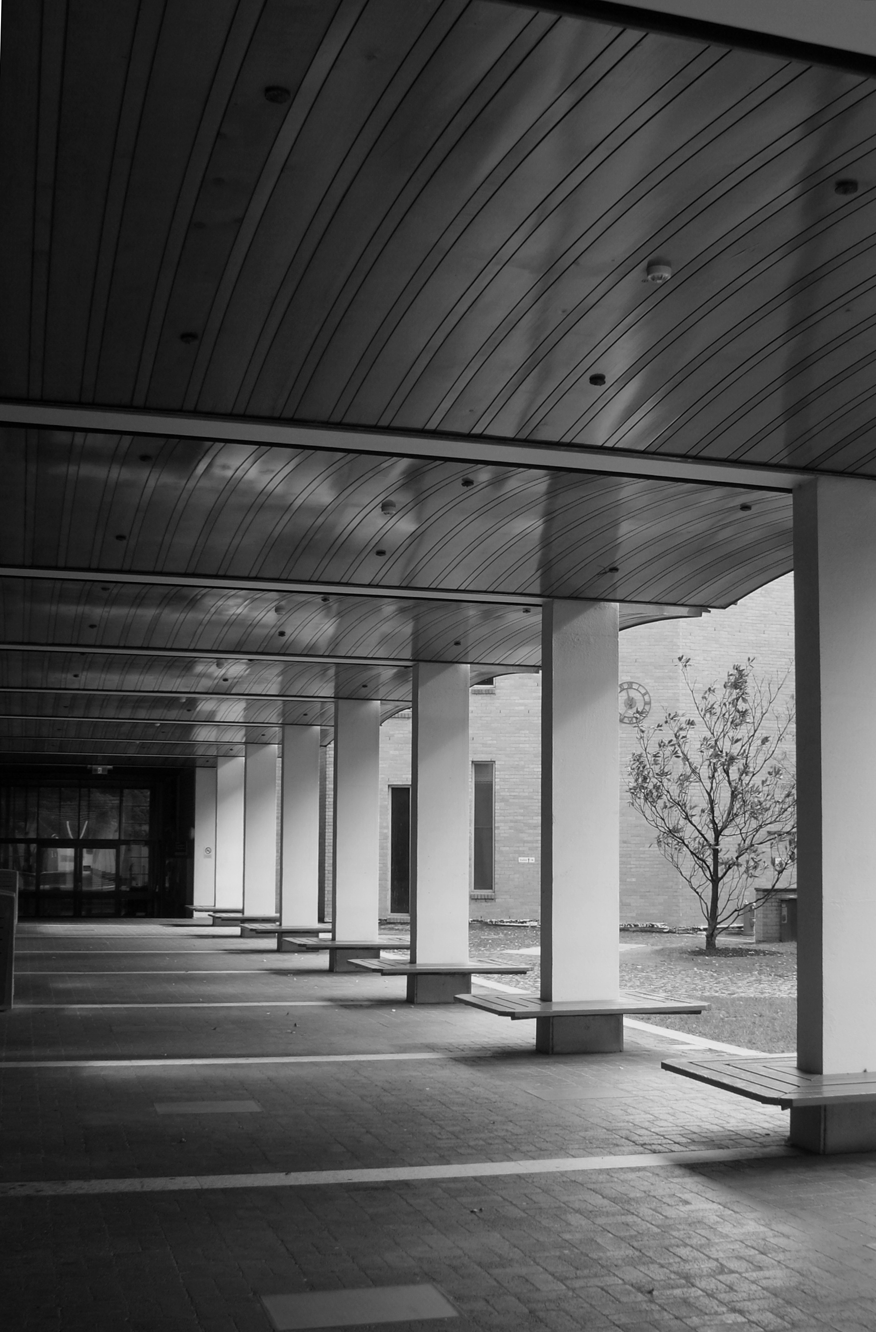
Redmond Barry Building,1959-61

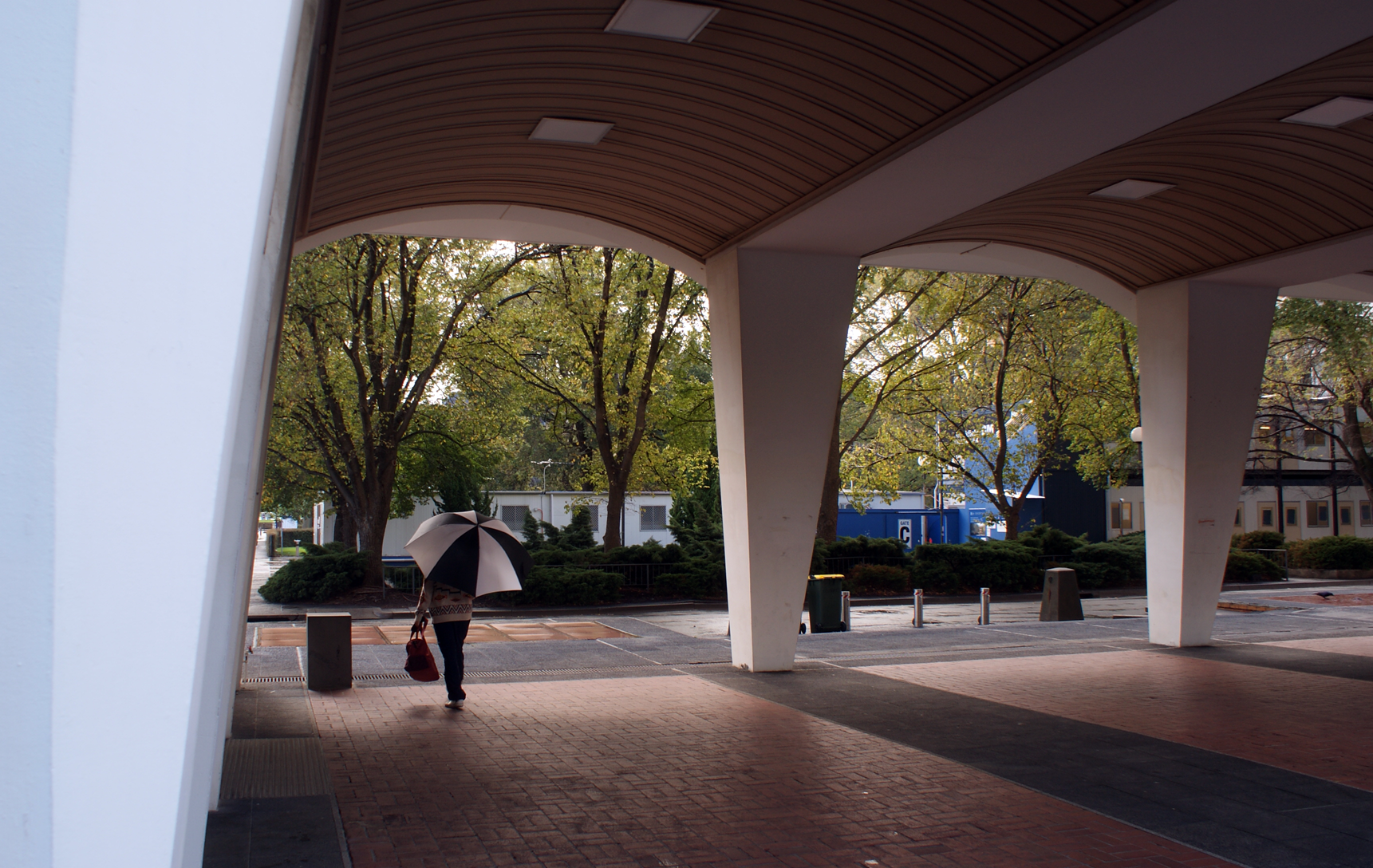
Raymond Priestley Building, 1967-70

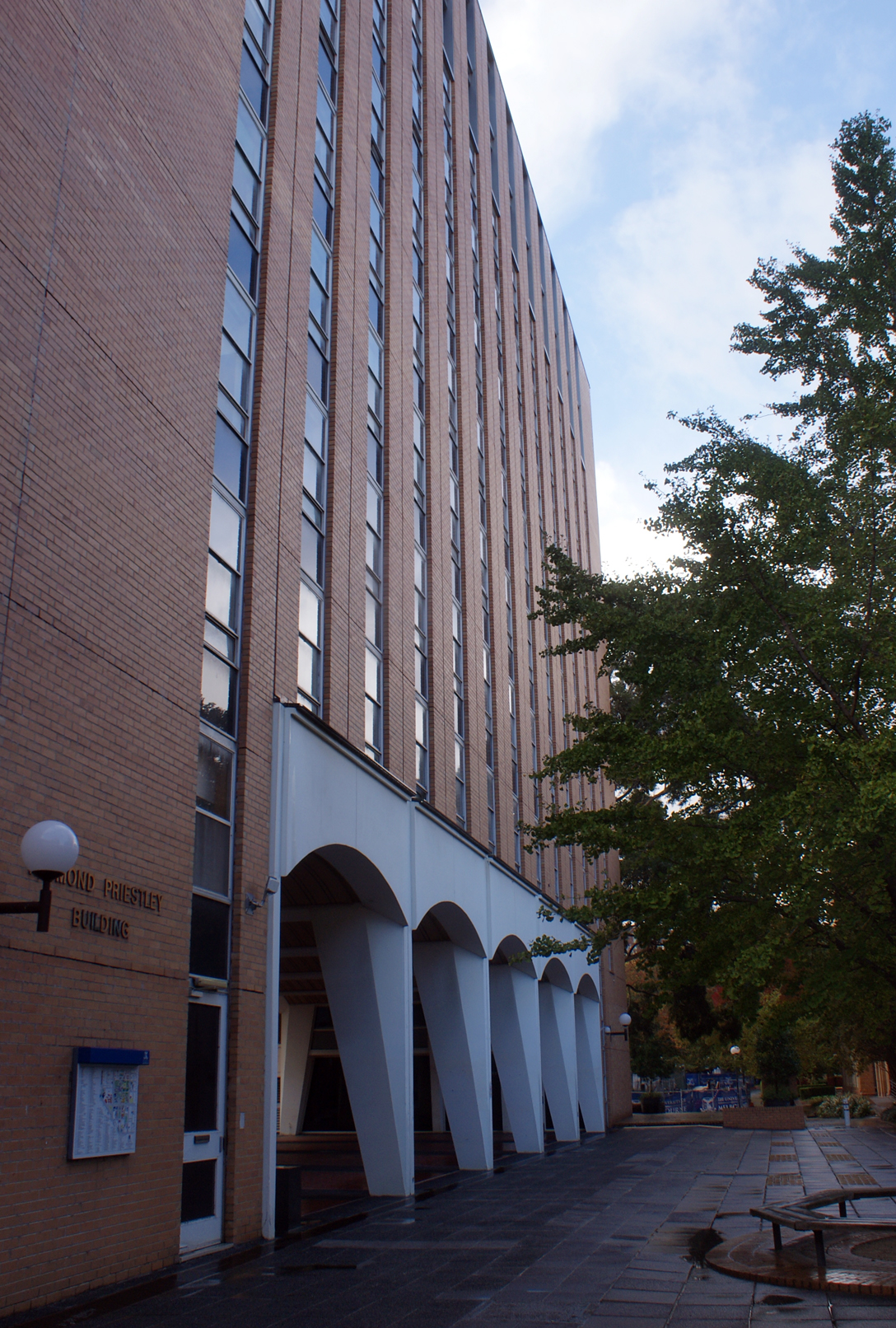
Raymond Priestley Building, 1967-70

== Biography ==
R.E.Featherstone (b. 1907, Hawthorn, Australia) began his education at Scotch College, and later Swinburne and West Melbourne Technical Colleges. He then began his internship with Edwin J & C L Ruck, while enrolled at the University of Melbourne for the diploma of Architectural Atelier. Upon completing his qualification, he stayed on at the University as an assistant instructor. He was employed by the firm Oakley & Parkes in 1930 and was involved in the design of Yule House (1932). During this period he retained his right to practice outside the firm and designed a residence for C M Werner, 13 Moorakyne Avenue, Malvern. In April 1934 he left Oakley & Parkes to pursue an interest in interior decoration and furniture design in Europe. While in Europe, he was employed in the practice of Harry Stuart Goodhart-Rendel a position which he held for several years as chief assistant working on cathedrals, hospitals and civic commissions. Upon his return to Melbourne he was employed once more at Oakley & Parkes and worked on the ANZAC House entry sequence (1938) and Phosphate House (1940). He then transferred to the practice of Stephenson & Turner, working on military and civilian hospitals. After World War II, Featherstone returned to the University of Melbourne as a lecturer, in charge of a short course of architectural design for returning servicemen. Then in 1947 when the Faculty of Architecture was established he maintained his position of senior lecturer. Three years later he left on a tour of Europe, America and the U.K. to study post-war building developments. This tour was the basis for his published report "Architectural education in Scandinavia, Western Europe, the United Kingdom, the United States of America". In 1954 the current professor of architecture at the University of Melbourne left for overseas travel, and Featherstone was appointed Acting Professor of Architecture. He had still retained the right to private practice and designed the house known as "Blue Peter"(1956) which gained national recognition when it was published in Neil Clerehan’s book "The Best Australian Houses".

In December 1957, Featherstone was given the position of staff architect at the University of Melbourne and worked on notable buildings on the University's Parkville campus, including the Redmond Barry building and the Raymond Priestley building. He retired as the staff architect in 1972 and was given an honorary Master of Philosophy degree. He later moved to Canberra where he was a consultant for the Australian Universities Commission; in 1978 he retired and returned once again to Melbourne.

Details from Rae Featherstone's first Builder's Payment Certificate Book stub of private work, Certificates 1 - 147 dated 16 August 1940 to 13 June 1956, in the possession of his family. Transcription in progress; one example per property.

- 001 16 August 1940, works at 22 Pine Avenue, Elwood for Mr E.R. Savige. Builder D. Harding. Six flats with special stairwell. Extant.
- 002 22 September 1940, works at 8 Grosvenor Court, Toorak for L. Roy C. Werner. Builder: W. Machin. Extant. Garage modernized and brought forward.
- 003 24 October 1940, works at 22 Maleela Avenue, Balwyn for K.C. Bainbridge. Still in possession of family in 2014. Intact from 1940. Pendant light fittings designed by architect. Confidentiality: permission granted to list surname. Builder: Pollard Bros.
- 005 24 November 1940, works at 11 Kerford Street, Malvern for E.K. Eriksen. Builder M. Lucas Pty Ltd. At "Eriskay" the hallmark screen door on single story residence survives which serves to authenticate the building.
- 014 29 September 1941, works at 260 Union Road, Balwyn for E.H. Leach. Front white timber screen door missing which was the finishing touch. It had prominent cross-bracing and large central disk. Additions at rear. Originally no front fence. Builder H. Carson & Son.
- 023 29 June 1942, works being period shop-front at 437 Toorak Road, Toorak Village, Toorak for C. Werner & Co., Opticians. Builder: A. Carson. No longer exists. Modernized twice since.
- 032 6 August 1945, works being Flat at 2 Fernhurst Grove, Kew for Miss Muriel Bell. "Cheswardine" 1900 near Kew Junction was divided in 1945 by closing a corridor and adding a projecting weatherboard vestibule on the north. House now restored to original with vestibule retained without the entry door and replicated in new weatherboards. Former brick steps are underneath. Builder L.A. Strouach.
- 036 5 October 1946, Brick veneer residence, 65 Kenmare Street, Mont Albert for Mr Frank Ayre. Builder: H.J. Doyle. The same screen door missing as mentioned above, and small porch added. Building is white, which was Rae's favourite wall colour.
- 037 12 October 1946 Brick veneer residence, 67 Kenmare Street, Mont Albert for self & family. Builder: H.J. Doyle. Subsequent development of roof space. White wall colour survives.
- 044 21 May 1947 Brick veneer residence, 30 Bertram Street, Burwood for Mrs Chas A. Cameron. Builder: H.T. McKern.
- 048 10 October 1947, works at Point Lonsdale for Dr & Mrs A. Russell Buchannan. Builder: Jas Nankervis of Queenscliff.
- 057 23 July 1948, works at 40 King Street, Ivanhoe for Mr Leslie J. Jordan. Builder: H.L. Humphries.
- 060 30 August 1948, works at Parkside Street, Blackburn for Mr H.S. Bowden, Dept. of Works & Housing, and Deputy Director War Service Homes Division. Builder: S.E. Greenwood.
- 074 18 May 1949, works at 340 Doncaster Road, North Balwyn for K.C. Trumble. Builder: Robert Owen.
- 086 6 June 1951, works ostensibly at Back Beach Road, Portsea for Harold R.P. Harman, but more accurately at 30 Delgany Avenue. Builder: J. James.
- 088 14 January 1953, works at 41 Lansell Road, Toorak for J.G. Campbell. Builder: G.J. Watson.
- 093 3 July 1953 Memorial Hall, Rosebud foreshore for Shire of Flinders, Dromana. Builder: John K. Ditchburn. Demolished as close to new divided carriageway. A first brick hall nearby survives, but is not this one.
- 097 25 September 1953, works at 16 Chastleton Avenue, Toorak for Mr Alan M. Colvin of Humes Ltd. Builder: W.O. Longmuir & Sons. Extension at rear. Land subdivided from property above in Orrong Road under proviso of flat roof only. In extreme danger from property values and elaborate new design styles.
- 107 works at (originally Collins Grove) now 95 Wattle Grove, Portsea for C.M. & M. Paynter. Builder: John K. Ditchburn.
- 112 15 August 1955, works at 19 - 21 Gulls Way, Frankston South for G. Nelson Raymond. Builder: T.D. Barret. The house has no name; confirmed by owner. Name borrowed from Anglesea by Neil Clerehan for publication hype. Photo by Wolfgang Sievers. 'Demolished' is too strong a term. Although rebuilt for Russell Thatcher the prow overlooking Daveys Bay replicates the original design accurately. Much original substructure and a stairway still exist. 21 is a vacant block of land belonging to the estate which guarantees a superb view over the water.
- 113 30 August 1955, works at 131 Mont Albert Road, Canterbury for Capt. F. Grose, Builder: W.F.R. Wood.
- 118 4 October 1955, works at Shepparton for Geof Thompson Cool Stores and Fruit Packing, Builder: A.V. Jennings

Additional Details

- c1933 works at 3 Bowen Street, Kew for Robert Featherstone (elder brother). Since subdivided internally and now 1 & 3 Bowen Street. Rae's father had working carriage horses in the tramway paddock next door which is now a car park.
- c1955 works at 34 Parker Street, Cnr Jackson Street, Anglesea for G.W.P. Unique illustrated sign "Blue Peter" has always hung from the eaves. Still in possession of family in 2014. Confidentiality applies.

== Notable projects ==
=== Yule House, 1932 ===
When he first began working in the office of Oakley & Parkes, Featherstone was involved in the design of the Yule House, 309-311 Little Collins Street. Built in 1932, Yule House is an exceptional example of Moderne Architecture in Melbourne, the "first commercial building in Australia to demonstrate the principles of the emerging Moderne style". The significant influence of Yule House can be seen in many of Featherstones projects.

=== ANZAC House, 1938 ===
The ANZAC house functions as a library and memorabilia collection for war time diaries, letters and other paraphernalia. This collection is part of the Victorian Collections. The building is a Georgian revival, Palazzo style typical of buildings in the early interwar period. The majority of the building design was done by Stanley Oaks. Featherstone’s involvement with this project specifically pertained to the entrance hall and entry facade itself.

=== Holiday residence for G Nelson Raymond (Blue Peter), 1956 ===
21 Gulls Way, also known as "Blue Peter" (built prior to the children's show, more likely referring to the nautical flag) gained national recognition when the house was published in ‘Best Australian Houses’ in 1961. Blue peter is a fairly typical example of the more modern and exclusive beach houses of the 1950s. The house consists of two interlocking squares and a triangular raised terrace facing the waterfront. The house was open-plan and could sleep 6 people, with spaces serving multiple purposes. The living room was planned around an elaborate stereophonic installation and served as a living area and dining room with a panoramic view onto the bay, and bay doors that opened onto the triangular terrace. Unfortunately the house was demolished in November 1991, just prior to the Trust councils classification.

=== Redmond Barry Building, 1959-61 ===
Under his recently appointed position as staff architect of Melbourne University (1957) Featherstone designed North Building in association with Eggleston MacDonald & Secomb. North building, later renamed to the Redmond Barry Building, remains the tallest building on the campus. At twelve storeys high, the landmark tower was constructed in a steel structure slab and podium style system, consisting of shear walls and reinforced concrete columns.

=== Raymond Priestley Building, 1967-70 ===
Raymond Priestley Building is a large University Administration building, used as office and function space. The building was constructed in a similar way to the Redmond Barry building: concrete slabs with reinforced concrete columns and brick shear walls. Standing eleven storeys high, the five iconic arches branching the building's elevated ground floor undercroft is an example of midcentury Modern Architecture in Melbourne.
