= Crittall Windows =

English manufacturer of steel-framed windows

- Type: Limited company
- Industry: specialised construction activities
- Founded: 1889
- Founder: Francis Berrington Crittall
- Headquarters: Witham, Essex, England
- Products: Steel-framed windows
- Website: crittall-windows.co.uk

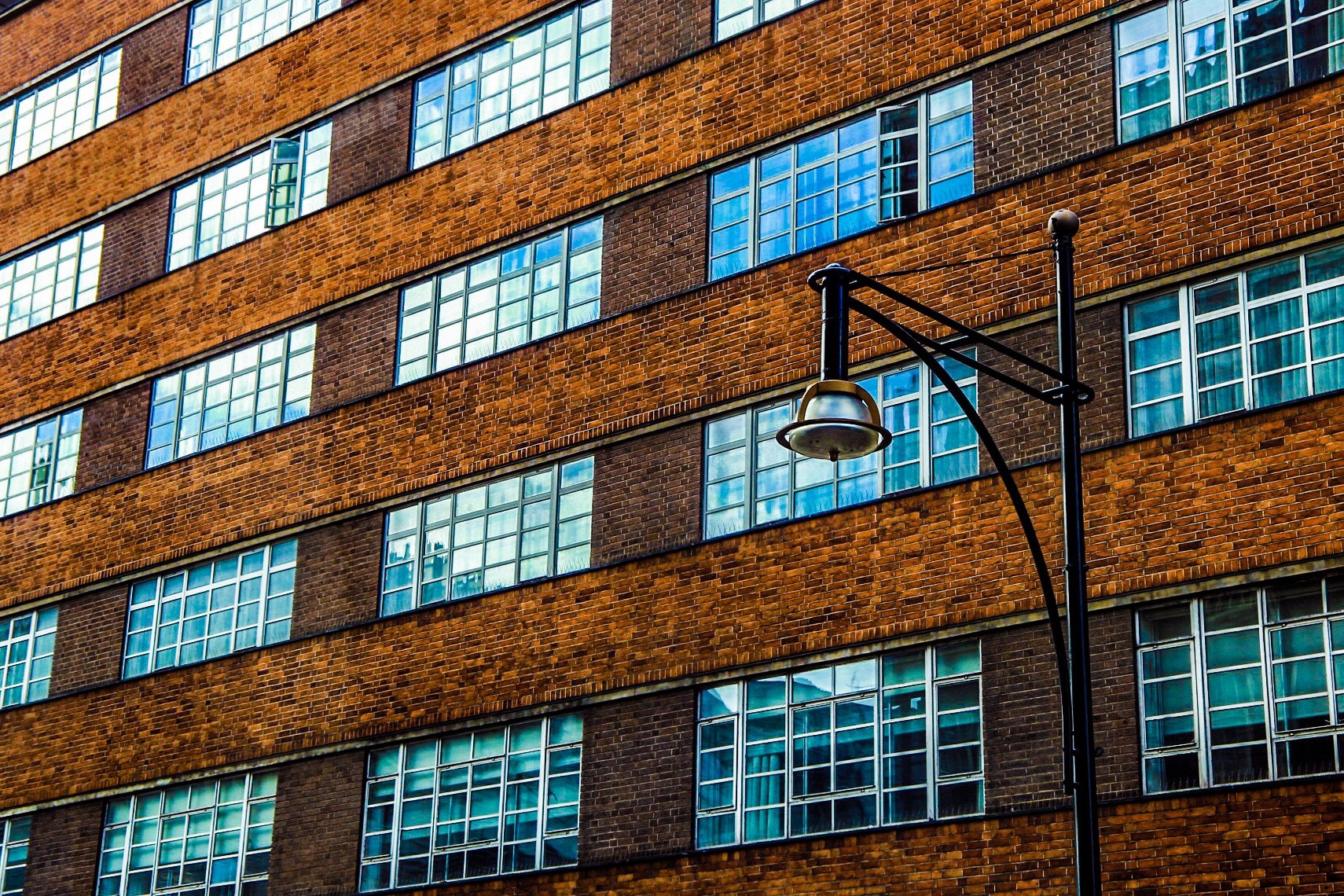
Crittal windows on a building in London

Crittall Windows Ltd is an English manufacturer of steel-framed windows, today based in Witham, Essex, close to its historic roots in the county. Its products have been used in thousands of buildings across the United Kingdom, including the Houses of Parliament and Tower of London, and are features particularly associated with the Art Deco and Modernist movements in early 20th-century architecture.

== Early history ==
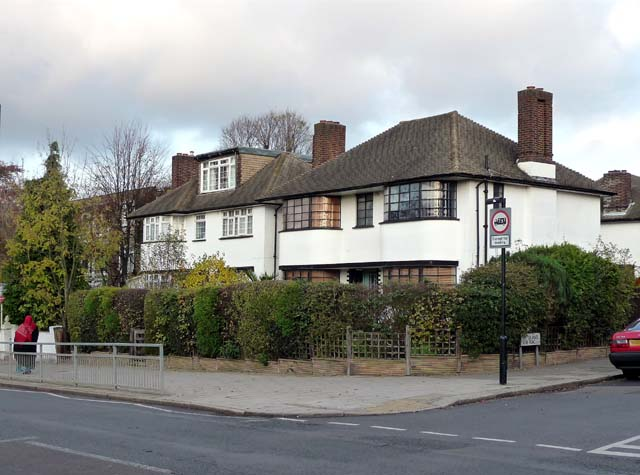
Pre-war houses in the London borough of Lambeth, with Crittall windows

The origins of the company date back to 1849, when Francis Berrington Crittall bought the Bank Street ironmongery in Braintree, Essex. However, it was not until 1884 that the company – by this time run by the founder's son Francis Henry Crittall (1860–1935) – began to manufacture metal windows. Five years later (1889), the Crittall Manufacturing Company Ltd was incorporated. At this time the firm's output in a two-year period was 20 tonnes. In 1880 the company employed 11 men, by the 1890s this figure was 34, by 1918, 500.

In 1907, Crittall bought the so-called Fenestra joint patent from the German company Fenestra in Düsseldorf. In the same year, Crittall began to operate the Detroit Steel Product Co, the first steel window factory in the United States. The company's windows were used in numerous buildings in North America and other parts of Europe, and were a feature of the RMS Titanic.

During the First World War, Crittall's factories were used in munitions production, but postwar the company returned to steel window manufacture. It formed a manufacturing agreement with Belgian firm Braat in 1918 and opened a works in Witham, Essex in 1919, partly to supply standard metal windows for the UK government's housing scheme.

The 1920s saw operations established in South Africa, India, Australia, New Zealand, Germany and in Washington, DC, in the US, followed by a company in Shanghai, China in 1931. The company also had a factory at Foots Cray, Kent, on a junction still known as "Crittall's Corner".

Amid this corporate expansion, the company started a model village at Silver End in Essex in 1926. The name most associated with the company at this time is that of W. F. Crittall, known as Mr Pink, who as both director and designer was responsible for the development of the steel windows and who was closely associated with the modern architectural movement that such windows are associated with.

In 1939, Crittall built its first galvanising plant at Witham, shortly before it once again became engaged in munitions production during the Second World War.

== Post-war history ==
During the 1940s and 1950s, Crittall began to manufacture aluminium windows and curtain walling, and in the 1960s was instrumental in the development of pressure chamber weather performance testing standards that are still used in the UK today. Its foray into aluminium windows began in 1947 when Crittall-Luxfer Aluminium Windows Ltd was formed after acquisition of Luxfer Ltd, based at Colwick, Nottinghamshire; it disposed of the business in 1962.

The post-war period saw Crittall undergo several major corporate changes. In 1965, it merged with Henry Hope & Sons Ltd to form Crittall Hope – a firm that was then taken over in 1968 by Slater Walker Securities. Six years later, in 1974, Crittall-Hope was acquired by Norcros Ltd, and Crittall Windows Limited Braintree and Witham was formed.

In 1990, Crittall moved to new premises in Braintree. Five years later, it was acquired by Apax Venture Capital, and then sold two years later (1997) to Marmon Corporation of Chicago. In 2002, the company was acquired by Laurel Holdings, and was then the subject of a management buy-out in 2004. In 2007, the company opened a new factory and head office in Witham. In April 2017, Crittall acquired Fendor, a manufacturer of blast-resistant and high-security glazing based in Washington, Tyne and Wear, forming Crittall Fendor.

== Notable buildings worldwide using Crittall windows ==
=== Asia ===
- Asia Insurance Building, Singapore
- Capitol Theatre, Singapore
- St. John's College, Hong Kong

=== United Kingdom ===
- 10 Dorchester Drive, Herne Hill, London
- Appleby Lodge, Manchester
- Astoria (a houseboat built in 1911 for impresario Fred Karno, and used since the 1980s as a recording studio by David Gilmour of Pink Floyd)
- BBC Television Centre, White City, London
- Belvedere Court, Finchley, London
- BISF houses, various locations
- Broadcasting House, Belfast
- Coventry Cathedral – the Great West Wall window
- Dolphin Square, Pimlico, London
- Dover House Estate, Roehampton, London
- Ealing Village, Ealing, London
- Elterwater Hostel, Cumbria
- Hewett Academy, Norwich, Norfolk (some elements of 1954 building)
- Hoover Building, Perivale, London
- Houses of Parliament, London
- Marine Court, St Leonards-on-Sea, East Sussex
- MCC building, Lord's Cricket Ground, London
- Mercat Cross, Glasgow
- Museum of the Home, London
- Princes House, Brighton
- Public Record Office, London
- Ravelston Garden – Art Deco residential flats, Edinburgh
- Royal Shakespeare Theatre, Stratford-upon-Avon
- Ritz Cinema, Burton upon Trent, Staffordshire
- Silver End village, Essex
- Snowdon summit building (1935–2006, designed by Clough Williams-Ellis)
- Southampton Civic Centre Clock Tower, Southampton
- Temperate House, Kew Gardens
- Tower Bridge, London
- Tower of London

=== United States ===
- 300 Central Park West, New York City
- 400 Sansome Street, San Francisco
- Ford River Rouge complex, Dearborn, Michigan
- Harvey Mudd College, California
- New York Botanical Gardens
- Princeton University, New Jersey
- RMS Queen Mary, California
- Yale University, Connecticut

== Association with Braintree Town ==
The company had a long historical association with Braintree Town F.C. The club was originally formed in 1898 and accepted into the North Essex League as Manor Works F.C., the company's works team. The club's nickname "The Iron" also comes from this source, reflecting the company's metal window frames. The club's crest reflects its origins and shows the factory of the old Crittall Garage which overlooked the club's Cressing Road ground before being demolished in 2005.

In 1921 the club changed its name to Crittall Athletic F.C. and soon afterwards moved to a new stadium which has been their home since. Around 1968 the club changed name once again, this time to Braintree & Crittall Athletic F.C., but when links with Crittall ended in 1981 they became Braintree Town F.C..
