= Francis Henry Crittall =

English businessman and philanthropist (1860–1935)

Francis Henry Crittall (1860–1935) was an English businessman and philanthropist who in 1884 in the Essex town of Braintree instigated the manufacture of metal-framed windows by the Crittall Manufacturing Company Ltd. This company, now known as Crittall Windows Ltd, became the world's leading manufacturer of steel-framed windows. Crittall also funded the development of the model village of Silver End in Essex.

Francis Henry Crittall was the son of Francis Berrington Crittall and Fanny Godfrey. Crittall, in 1849, bought the Bank Street ironmongery in Braintree. After gaining work experience in Birmingham and Chester, Francis Henry took over the family business following his father's death, and in 1884 began to manufacture metal-framed windows. Five years later (1889), the Crittall Manufacturing Company Ltd was incorporated.

At this time the firm's output in a two-year period was 20 tonnes. In 1880 the company employed 11 men, by the 1890s this figure was 34, by 1918, 500.

Under Crittall's management, the company expanded both domestically and internationally, manufacturing munitions during the First World War and then providing metal window frames for the UK government's post-war housing investment programme.

Crittall's portrait was painted by Augustus Edwin John in 1919, and the work was donated by the Crittall family to the National Portrait Gallery in 1994.

== Silver End ==
By the 1920s, it was clear that the town of Braintree could not support the needs of the Crittall workforce. Crittall employees and their families made up an estimated 10,000 of the 18,000 population of the town. Francis Crittall, after an experiment with housing in Cressing Road, Braintree, therefore decided to build a village for his factory and workforce. The Silver End Model Village, near Witham, was started in 1926, and was intended to provide a good standard of living accommodation and civic amenities centred on a Crittall factory.

While Francis Henry Crittall funded the Silver End development, it was his second son, Walter 'Pink' Crittall (1887–1956) who provided much of the artistic and technical direction. He designed houses for himself and for Crittalls' employees and, with architect Thomas S. Tait, was largely responsible for the style and appearance of Silver End.

== Family life ==
Crittall married Ellen Laura Carter, daughter of George Carter and Laura Hadley Rodway, on 6 September 1883. Together they had four children, including Valentine George Crittall, 1st and last Baron Braintree (1884–1961), and lived at Manors in Silver End. The couple produced a memoir, Fifty Years of Work and Play, published by Constable in 1934.
