= Princes House, Brighton =

Historic site in Brighton, England

Princes House
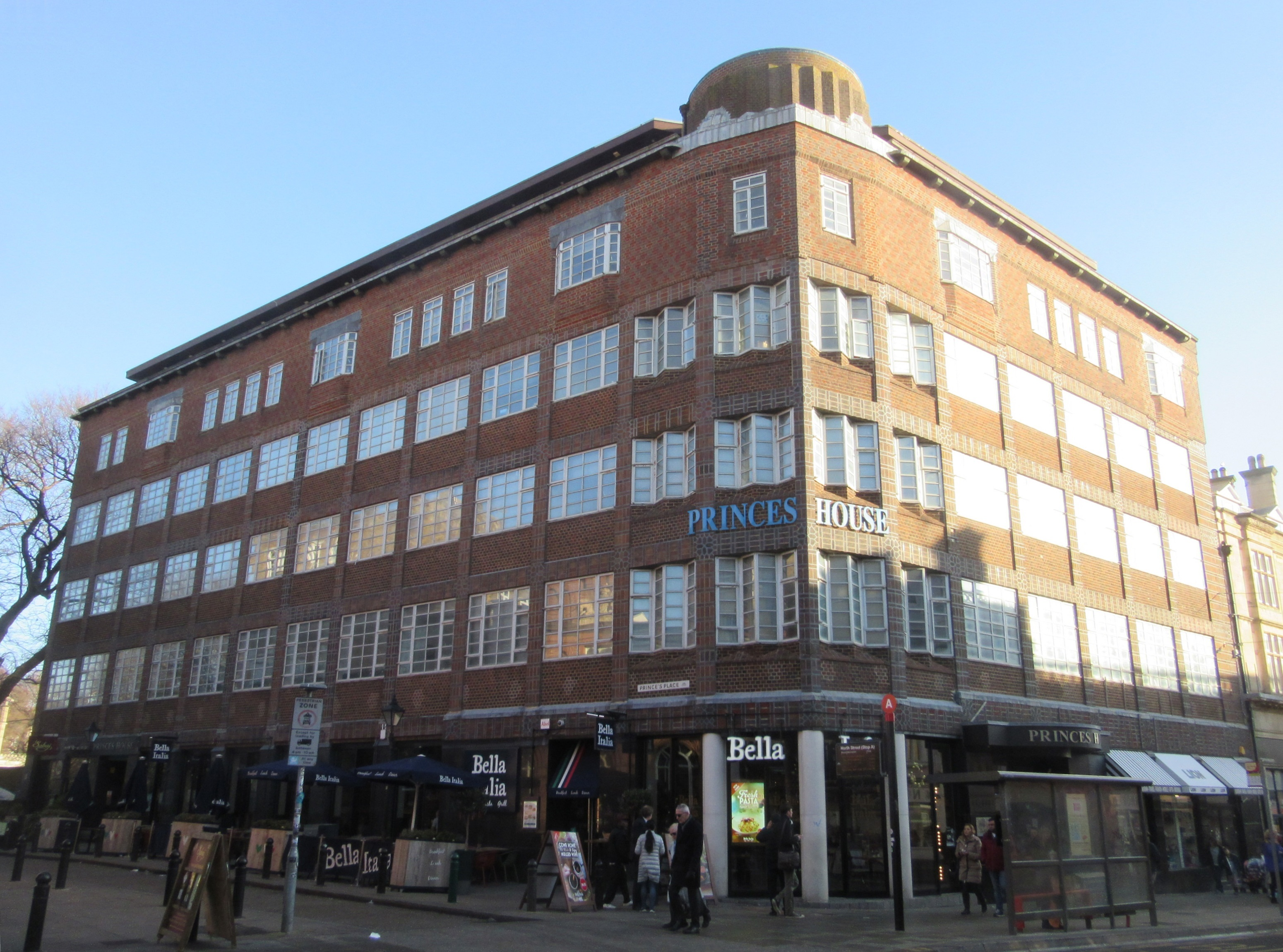
- The building from the west-southwest

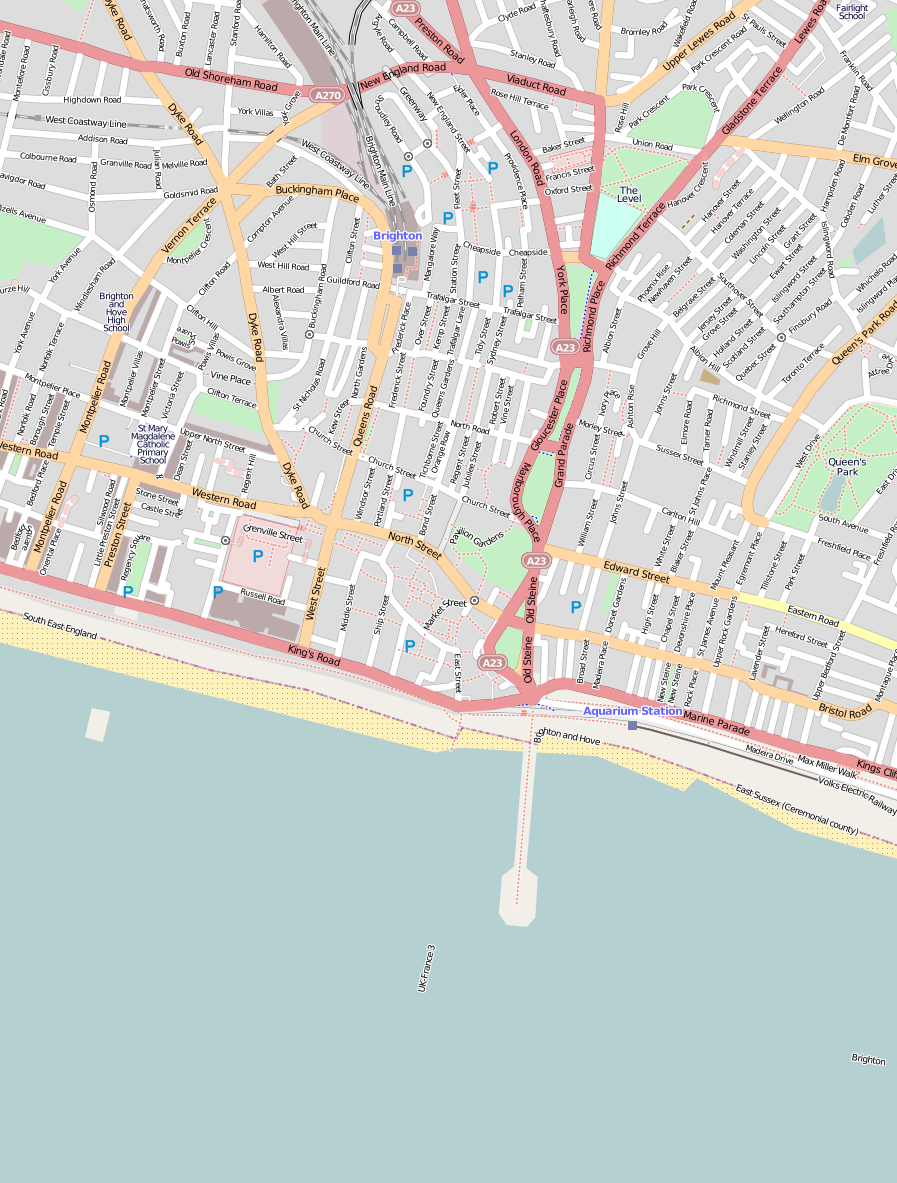
- Location within central Brighton
- 50.822406°N 0.139033°W
- Location: 166–169 North Street, Brighton, Brighton and Hove BN1 1EA, United Kingdom

History
- Built: 1935–36
- Built for: Brighton & Sussex Equitable Permanent Building Society

Site notes
- Architect: Harry Stuart Goodhart-Rendel
- Architectural style: Early Modernist/Eclectic

Listed Building – Grade II
- Official name: Norwich Union House
- Designated: 4 November 1994
- Reference no.: 1380623

Princes House (formerly Norwich Union House) is an office and residential building in the centre of Brighton, part of the English coastal city of Brighton and Hove. The prominently sited building, an example of Harry Stuart Goodhart-Rendel's "inimitable response to Modernism", was purpose-built as the headquarters of the Brighton & Sussex Building Society, forerunner of the Alliance & Leicester. The office was later used by Norwich Union, another financial institution, and now houses a restaurant and flats. The steel-framed structure is clad in red bricks with inlaid mosaicwork, forming a carefully detailed façade, and the corner elevation has an arrangement of brickwork and windows which suggests "the pleated folds of a curtain". The building is listed at Grade II for its architectural and historical importance.

== History ==
The Brighton & Sussex Equitable Permanent Building Society was founded in 1863 in Brighton by three businessmen: Marriage Wallis, Frederick Tooth and Richard Bevan. Its chairmen included Alderman Sir Herbert Carden (1929–39) and Lewis Cohen, Baron Cohen of Brighton. Under Carden's leadership, its assets increased by nearly 225 times to nearly £5 million. In 1935 the society commissioned architect Harry Stuart Goodhart-Rendel to design a new head office on North Street, Brighton's main commercial street since the start of the 19th century and home to many large banks and offices. A site on the corner of Prince's Place was chosen; this short street, dominated by the Chapel Royal, was laid out in the 18th century and originally led to Promenade Grove, Brighton's first pleasure gardens (now part of the Royal Pavilion grounds). The office opened in 1936, although some clerical staff still occupied premises on New Road nearby. During World War II, important documents and other assets were moved to Saddlescombe on the South Downs, where they were stored underground, and the roof of the building was used to mount a battery of anti-aircraft guns. The building society established a sports and social club in 1935 and housed it in the basement of the partly built office. Consisting at first of "15 members and a second-hand table tennis table and dartboard", over the years it developed into the Alliance Sports Club, a major corporate sports and social club.

The Brighton & Sussex changed its name to the Alliance Building Society in 1945. After mergers with more than 20 other building societies, culminating in its amalgamation with the Leicester in 1985, it took the name Alliance & Leicester and was Britain's fifth largest building society by 1990, holding assets in excess of £13 billion. It is now part of Santander Group. Much of its postwar growth came under Baron Cohen of Brighton's leadership, and in January 1956 he announced that a new headquarters would be built on land overlooking Hove Park in neighbouring Hove. The steel-framed concrete and granite building opened in 1967. Princes House was acquired by insurance company Norwich Union and was renamed Norwich Union House, a name it retained at the time it became a listed building in 1994. At some time before this, "a rash of modernisation" added "incongruous" canopies to the south and west elevations and removed a backlit triangular staircase which led up from the entrance hall, a heptagonal room reached through the original entrance at the southwest corner.

In 2002, property developer Baron Homes Corporation acquired the building and converted the upper storeys into 34 flats. (There are now two penthouse apartments and 30 standard flats. In early 2017, when the entire building had to be evacuated because of a fire, there were 50 residents.) As part of this work, to meet Brighton and Hove City Council's planning and conservation requirements, the original Crittall steel windows were replaced with identical new windows powder-coated with the same pale blue finish as the originals. The ground floor remained in commercial use, and for several years it was occupied by a branch of tapas bar La Tasca. A fire in 2012 caused damage to the restaurant and caused the evacuation of the rest of the building. La Tasca's owners then used the premises to test a new format of tapas bar: in January 2013 the restaurant closed and was reopened under the name Bellota Bar y Tapas, still under the same ownership but giving the appearance of being an independent restaurant. It included a separate cava bar. This closed in 2016 and the premises were converted into a branch of the Bella Italia Italian restaurant chain.

One of the penthouse apartments, which has an octagonal kitchen and two balconies with extensive views over the city and its hinterland, was bought by local businessman Mike Holland from a former owner of Crawley Town F.C. Holland owns several heritage buildings in the city, such as the Astoria Theatre, the Grade I-listed Stanmer House and the Grade II*-listed British Engineerium.

== Heritage ==
Under its former name of Norwich Union House, Princes House was listed at Grade II by English Heritage on 4 November 1994. This status is given to "nationally important buildings of special interest". As of February 2001, it was one of 1,124 Grade II-listed buildings and structures, and 1,218 listed buildings of all grades, in the city of Brighton and Hove.

The building is within the Valley Gardens Conservation Area, one of 34 conservation areas in the city of Brighton and Hove. This was designated by Brighton Council in 1973 and covers 92.84 acres (37.57 ha).

== Architecture ==
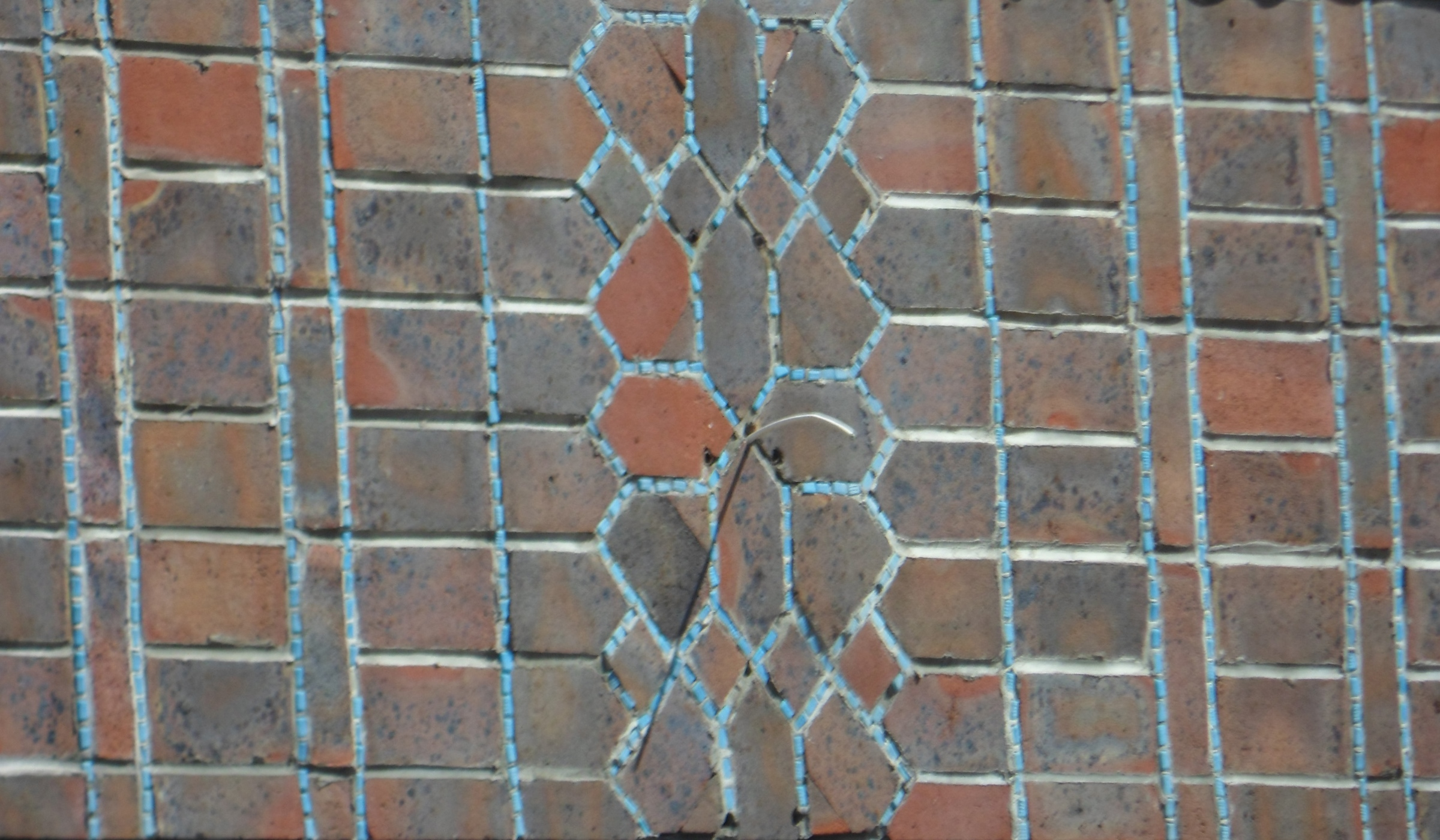
The brickwork is inlaid with blue tile and glass fragments.

Harry Stuart Goodhart-Rendel was an architect, architectural writer, former president of the Royal Institute of British Architects and former Brighton resident who adopted a distinctive interpretation of Modern architecture in his designs, particularly at St Wilfrid's Church (1932–34) in the Elm Grove area of Brighton and at Princes House itself. "Much more idiosyncratic and edgy" than the "polished" conventional Modernism of Embassy Court, built a year earlier, the building's simple steel-framed construction contrasts with the "decorative treatment of [its] cladding materials", which include reddish handmade sand-faced bricks, blue glass and tiles inlaid between the bricks, and green slate. The overall design is both "progressive and indebted to 19th-century traditions".

The five-storey building has elevations facing south (on to North Street; five bays), west (with 11 bays facing Prince's Place) and north (six bays facing the Royal Pavilion Gardens). The structure of the steel frame is emphasised by being overlaid with handmade bricks in a soldier course pattern both horizontally and vertically. At each join, the brickwork is laid in a starburst pattern, and pieces of blue tile and glass are inlaid into the joints between the bricks. Green slate is used as a sheathing material at ground-floor level on the rear elevation. Between each section of steel framing, each bay is treated identically in the form of "a cell of identical dimensions and design", consisting of a full-width steel casement window (those at first-floor level slightly taller than those above them) above a panel of red bricks laid in the header bond pattern. The top storey is expressed differently, with single or double pairs of narrow windows alternating with larger, slightly projecting windows in the style of a shallow bay window. The whole of the top storey is also set forwards slightly. Above this, a parapet runs around the whole roof except at the southwest corner, where there is a tower in the form of a short cylinder with zig-zag walls. This zig-zag effect is carried on down the whole of the southwest corner, where the windows have this layout and are slightly recessed.

== See also ==
- Grade II listed buildings in Brighton and Hove: P–R
- Media related to Princes House, Brighton at Wikimedia Commons

== Bibliography ==
- Antram, Nicholas; Morrice, Richard (2008). Brighton and Hove. Pevsner Architectural Guides. London: Yale University Press. ISBN 978-0-300-12661-7.
- Brighton Polytechnic. School of Architecture and Interior Design (1987). A Guide to the Buildings of Brighton. Macclesfield: McMillan Martin. ISBN 1-869865-03-0.
- Carder, Timothy (1990). The Encyclopaedia of Brighton. Lewes: East Sussex County Libraries. ISBN 0-861-47315-9.
- Collis, Rose (2010). The New Encyclopaedia of Brighton. (based on the original by Tim Carder) (1st ed.). Brighton: Brighton & Hove Libraries. ISBN 978-0-9564664-0-2.
- Middleton, Judy (2002). The Encyclopaedia of Hove & Portslade. Brighton: Brighton & Hove Libraries.
