= Maltings Academy =

Coordinates: 51.7970°N 0.6323°E

Lift Maltings

Location
- Spinks Lane; Anglia; Witham, Essex, CM8 1EP; England

Information
- Type: Academy
- Motto: Providing an excellent education for every child, in every classroom, every day.
- Established: September 2008
- Local authority: Essex
- Trust: Lift Schools
- Specialist: Music
- Department for Education URN: 135653 Tables
- Ofsted: Reports
- Principal: Leanne Abbott-Jones
- Gender: Coeducational
- Age: 11 to 16
- Houses: Attenborough, Stormzy, Scott, Watson
- Colours: Blue, Black, Red
- Website: http://www.liftmaltings.org

Lift Maltings (MTA) is a secondary school in Witham, Essex, it is the smaller of two secondary schools in Witham. It is a relatively new school as it is a replacement for the John Bramston School.

In October 2006 the previous school (John Bramston) was graded 4 by Ofsted, meaning 'Inadequate' and as a result the school was put under special measures. In March 2015 the school was given grade 1 by Ofsted, meaning 'Outstanding'.

A new head, Mike O'Sullivan was appointed Easter 2007, replacing the longstanding former headteacher the late Ted Rowley. John Bramston School became Maltings Academy on 1 September 2008. A new Principal, Mr John Szynal was appointed in the spring term of 2010.

The school has a principal and executive principal. The academy is now in a new £26 million purpose-built building that was constructed by Carillion (Completed summer 2011).

Maltings Academy has moved from GCSE English to the IGCSE English qualification.

In 2012, 94% of pupils achieved 5 GCSE A*-C grades (51% including English and Maths).

Maltings Academy restaurant has been run by CucinA since October 2012.

The Maltings Academy Sixth Form has a common room, computer suite/study room and students also have access to the restaurant throughout the day. The Sixth Form is now a joint collaboration with New Rickstones Academy, also in Witham. Through this joint arrangement over 45 courses are now on offer at Level 3 and also Level 2.

There was talk of merging Maltings Academy with New Rickstones Academy, however this was opposed by many people and they are now keeping teaching side of the schools separate however they plan to merge the support services by 2016.

The Governing Body and the Senior Management of the two schools is now the same.

In the new 'Progress 8' measurement of GCSE success as published by Gov.UK, Maltings Academy scored only an average score in the league table for Summer 2016, as published in 2017.
