= James Beardwell =

Fan of Witham Town F.C. (born 30 June 1983)

James Beardwell BEM
- Born: June 30, 1983 (age 43)

Instagram information
- Page: James Beardwell BEM
- Followers: 28.9K

TikTok information
- Page: James Beardwell BEM
- Followers: 51.9K

X information
- Handle: @JamesBeardwell
- Display name: James Beardwell BEM 🏴󠁧󠁢󠁥󠁮󠁧󠁿
- Followers: 8.7K

YouTube information
- Channel: James Beardwell
- Subscribers: 8.19k
- Views: 598,363
- Last updated: 26 October 2026, 14:08 GMT

James Beardwell (born 30 June 1983) is a fan of non-league football club Witham Town F.C., known for his consistent support of the group. Following a 2015 appearance on Channel 4 reality TV show The Undateables, in February 2018 he received online attention after being recorded as the only fan to attend a Witham Town match against Bostik North, singing loudly for the match's full 90 minutes. He has continued his support of the team since and works as a content creator for Witham Town as of 2026. Beardwell has autism and learning disabilities.

== Public life ==
From 2015, Beardwell appeared on the Channel 4 reality TV show The Undateables. By February 2018, he was working at Sainsbury's in Springfield, Chelmsford in Essex, on trolleys. He stated that month that he had been supporting Witham Town F.C. for 12 and a half years. On 7 February 2018, when defender Lance Akins left Witham Town to join Coggeshall, Beardwell posted a video stating that he was "literally fuming" with the decision.

On 17 February 2018, Beardwell was the only away supporter who made the trip to support Witham Town at their match against Bostik North at Grays Athletic. He chanted at the match for the full 90 minutes, despite Witham's 4-1 loss. He was recorded by a fan in the opposite stands, chanting by himself in his yellow team jersey and blue team scarf, adapting the "Will Grigg's On Fire" chant into his own chant of "Beardwell's on Fire". He also filmed himself singing about former Witham Town player and singer Olly Murs's transfer to Coggeshall. Witham lost the match 4-1. Following the conclusion of the game, all of the Witham players came over to thank Beardwell personally for his support. The video of Beardwell's attendance of the match was viewed over 600,000 times by 20 February. Former footballer Chris Kamara and EastEnders actor Jake Wood both praised him. Beardwell was invited onto football talk show Soccer AM, and Sky Sports made a short documentary covering him. In May, he was named bookmaker William Hill's non-league fan of the year at the National Game Awards, run by coaching provider SCL. For 15 September, Dereham Town F.C. invited Beardwell as a special guest of its manager Neal Simmonds for their match against Witham Town at Aldiss Park.

In 2019, fellow football fan Chris Daines began a £500 fundraiser for Beardwell to go on a round trip to see a Guernsey F.C. match against another opponent. Daines stated that he believed it was "a good way of saying thank you to him and showing other autistic people that travelling alone isn't something to be afraid of", and Beardwell said it was "about showing fellow autistic people that you can travel by yourself and that you don't need to be nervous about it."

By 2026, Beardwell was creating online content for Witham Town. On 8 March that year, a group of YouTubers – Ellis Platten, Alfie Indra and Ben Gibbs of the channel AwayDays – to appeal to their viewers to support Witham Town in a home match against Gorleston F.C. 1,205 Witham supporters from the UK and abroad attended, breaking the club's previous 2014 record of 898 attendees. The YouTubers said they were inspired to do this by Beardwell, Platten having seen him at a match in 2017. Beardwell stated that it was nice to have fans from across the globe supporting the club.

== Personal life ==
Beardwell has autism and learning disabilities. In December 2017, he announced his engagement to Claire Styles after meeting her six months prior at a Mencap football training event in Thurrock.
