= Witham Town Hall =

Municipal building in Witham, Essex, England

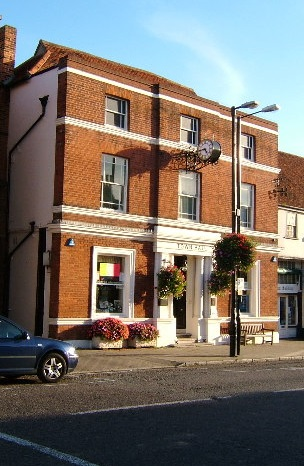
- Witham Town Hall

- Shown in Essex
- 51.7990°N 0.6394°E
- Location: Newland Street, Witham

History
- Built: c. 1800

Site notes
- Architectural style: Neoclassical style

Listed Building – Grade II
- Official name: 61, Newland Street
- Designated: 4 August 1971
- Reference no.: 1122592

Witham Town Hall is a municipal building in Newland Street, Witham, Essex, England. The building, which is the meeting place of Witham Town Council, is a Grade II listed building.

== History ==
The building was originally built as a two-storey timber framed coaching inn which became known as "The George" and was built to accommodate stagecoach passengers travelling between London and Colchester in the 15th century. The design involved a first floor which jettied out across the pavement: the building continued to operate as a public house until the 1790s.

The structure was remodelled in the neoclassical style in around 1800: the existing frame was completely encased in red brick with a new façade at that time. The new design involved a symmetrical main frontage with three bays facing onto Newland Street; the central bay, which slightly projected forward, featured a portico with Tuscan order columns and pilasters supporting a cornice and an entablature. The outer bays on the ground floor were fenestrated with sash windows with architraves while the first floor was fenestrated with sash windows with glazing bars. There were three false windows on the second floor, installed to disguise the fact that the original timber roof sloped away behind and, at roof level, there was a stone band and a parapet. In the 19th century the building functioned as a private property known as "Witham House".

Following significant population growth, largely associated with the status of Witham as a market town, the area became an urban district in 1895 but the new council chose to establish its offices in Collingwood Road rather than in any of the buildings in the main thoroughfare, Newland Street. The building was converted for use as a branch of Barclays Bank in 1910, when a projecting clock, donated by Percy Lawrence, was installed above the central first-floor window. It continued to operate as a bank until Barclays moved to an adjacent building to the northeast in 1939.

The building then became a tobacconists' wholesaler, L. J. Rippon & Sons, and remained in that use until the 1960s. Following a brief period as a showroom for Magnet & Southern, it became a branch of Town and Country Building Society in the 1970s. After Town and Country Building Society was acquired by The Woolwich in 1992, the building became vacant and it was bought by Witham Town Council in 1994.

A council chamber was established on the first floor and a visitor information centre was opened on the ground floor at the front of the building. A plaque that had been presented to the town during Warship Week was one of the various heritage items that were subsequently installed in the new town hall. (Note: During Second World war, the council took part in Warship Week and adopted the frigate HMS Chelmer for the town in March 1942.) Furniture and rare documents were also added to the collection. Following completion of an extensive programme of refurbishment works, the Home Secretary and local member of parliament, Priti Patel, visited the town hall in September 2021.
