= St Wilfrid's Church, Brighton =

St Wilfrid's Church
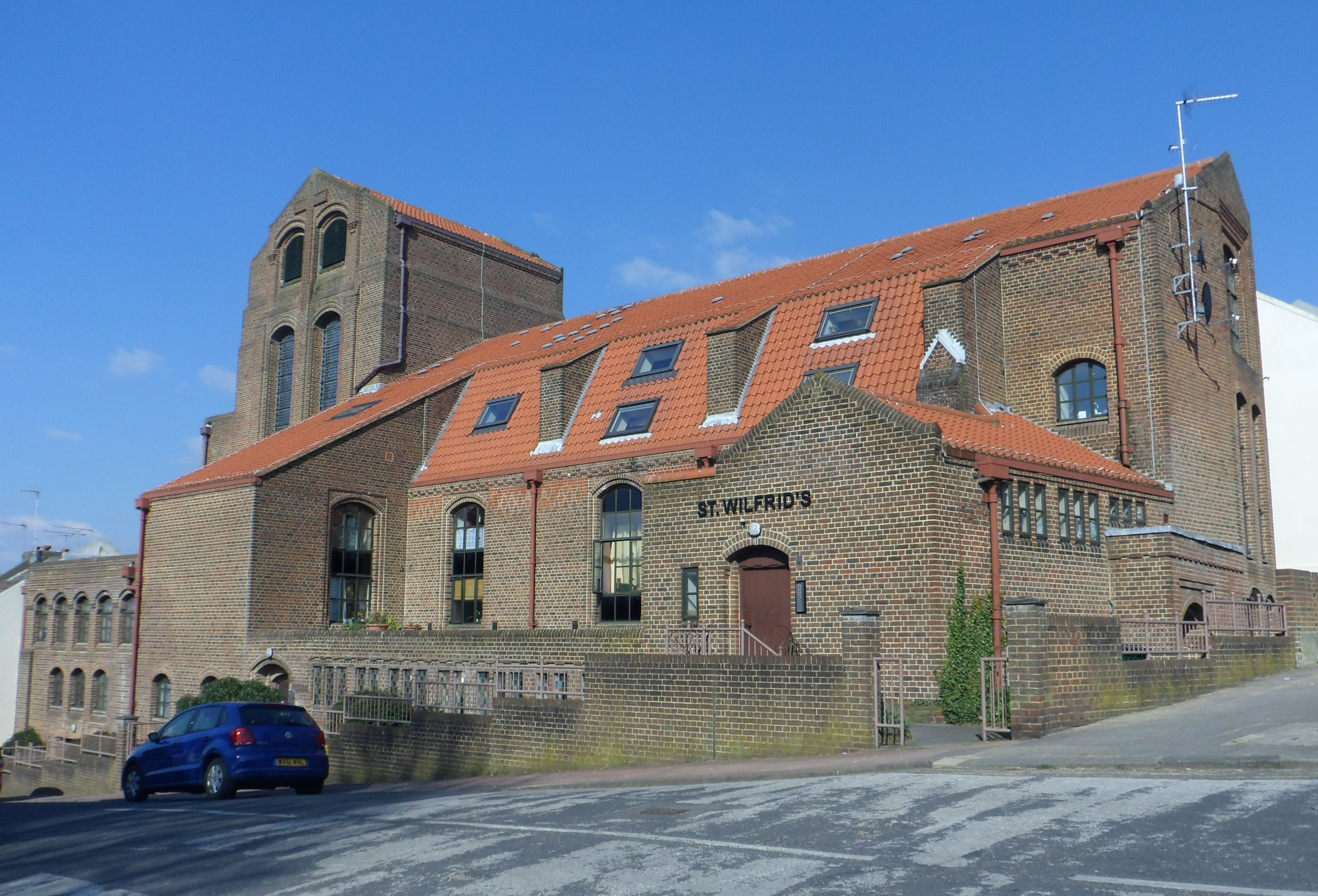
- The former church seen from the southwest in 2013
- St Wilfrid's Church
- 50.8317°N 0.1210°W
- Location: Whippingham Road, Brighton, Brighton and Hove BN2 3PZ
- Country: England
- Denomination: Anglican

History
- Status: Church
- Founded: 25 August 1901
- Dedication: Saint Wilfrid
- Events: 1932–1934: Rebuilt; 1980: Closed

Architecture
- Functional status: Redundant
- Heritage designation: Grade II listed
- Designated: 14 January 1981
- Architect: Harry Stuart Goodhart-Rendel
- Style: Eclectic
- Closed: 1980

St Wilfrid's Church is a former Anglican church in the Elm Grove area of Brighton, part of the English city of Brighton and Hove. Designed and built in the 1930s to replace a temporary building in the densely populated Elm Grove area, its unusual design—not conforming with architectural norms of the era—was widely praised. It was declared redundant after less than 50 years as a place of worship, and was converted into sheltered housing with minimal alteration to the exterior. Shortly after its closure, it was granted Grade II listed status.

== History ==
Elm Grove, a steep road running from central Brighton eastwards to Brighton Racecourse on Race Hill, was laid out in the 1850s. Residential development occurred in two stages: during the 1860s, and in the 1880s. Tightly packed terraced housing was provided on the northern and southern slopes of the hill between the 1860s and 1900, and the area became very densely populated.

At first, Anglican services were held in a series of rented rooms and halls in the area. The congregation outgrew these, and a temporary church built of tin was constructed on the site of the present church, at the junction of Elm Grove and Whippingham Road. This was inaugurated on 25 August 1901. A year earlier, the area had been designated a district within the Parish of Brighton. The church was dedicated in 1902 by the Bishop of Chichester Ernest Wilberforce.

The church was given its own parish in 1922. An extra 2,000 people came within its boundaries, and a permanent church was required. £15,000 was raised by parishioners and from other sources, and services were held in the nearby parish hall (built in 1927) while the new church was built. Harry Stuart Goodhart-Rendel was commissioned to design it, and building firm George Lynn and Sons Ltd were responsible for the construction. It was consecrated on 25 November 1933 by George Bell, the incumbent Bishop of Chichester.

German painter Hans Feibusch's first work in the United Kingdom—where he worked for most of his career—was a large mural in the Lady chapel, which he designed between 1940 and 1941. Bishop Bell commissioned Feibusch to provide many other murals and paintings for the Diocese of Chichester, including at Chichester Cathedral.

The discovery of blue asbestos in the church interior resulted in its closure in 1980. The fabric of the building deteriorated during its period of disuse. When the Church Commissioners announced their intention to demolish the building, it was granted listed status and a public inquiry was held. The threat of demolition was lifted, and the building was stripped internally and converted into flats for elderly people.

== Architecture ==
Goodhart-Rendel was a former president of the Royal Institute of British Architects. He also designed a large office building (Princes House) in the centre of Brighton and various similar buildings in London. For his work on St Wilfrid's Church, he combined his interest in 19th-century church architecture with modern structural ideas and materials in a way consistent with the architectural concept of Eclecticism. Its style has been described as tending towards Rationalism in its "expression of structure"; "remarkable" in its ingenuity, as it "does not imitate any style of the past, nor ... the modern style of 1930"; and "highly original". John Betjeman called it "about the best 1930s church there is".

The exterior walls are two-tone brick (red and brown), built with double thickness. The brickwork is laid out in the Flemish bond style and was produced locally, by the Keymer Brick and Tile Works in Burgess Hill. The roof is of reinforced concrete and was treated to make it fireproof. The tower at the west end has a saddleback roof. Inside, the chancel stood higher than the altar and sanctuary, and was separated from it with a lintel; similarly, a lintel, rather than the more usual chancel arch, separated the chancel from the five-bay nave. To make the altar as clearly visible as possible from all parts of the church, Goodhart-Rendel made the nave wide and the north and south aisles narrow and low. There was also a baptistery at a higher level than the nave, a porch, a side chapel and a vestry.

== The building today ==
St Wilfrid's Church was listed at Grade II by English Heritage on 14 January 1981. As of February 2001, it was one of 1,124 Grade II-listed buildings and structures, and 1,218 listed buildings of all grades, in the city of Brighton and Hove.

A residential development called "St Wilfrid's Flats" now occupies the interior of the former church.

== See also ==
- Grade II listed buildings in Brighton and Hove: S
- List of places of worship in Brighton and Hove

== Bibliography ==
- Brighton Polytechnic. School of Architecture and Interior Design (1987). A Guide to the Buildings of Brighton. Macclesfield: McMillan Martin. ISBN 1-869-86503-0.
- Carder, Timothy (1990). The Encyclopaedia of Brighton. Lewes: East Sussex County Libraries. ISBN 0-86147-315-9.
- Elleray, D. Robert (2004). Sussex Places of Worship. Worthing: Optimus Books. ISBN 0-9533132-7-1.
- Musgrave, Clifford (1981). Life in Brighton. Rochester: Rochester Press. ISBN 0-571-09285-3.
- Nairn, Ian; Pevsner, Nikolaus (1965). The Buildings of England: Sussex. Harmondsworth: Penguin Books. ISBN 0-14-071028-0.
