= Yule House =

Office building in Melbourne, Australia

Coordinates: 37.815069°S 144.964324°E

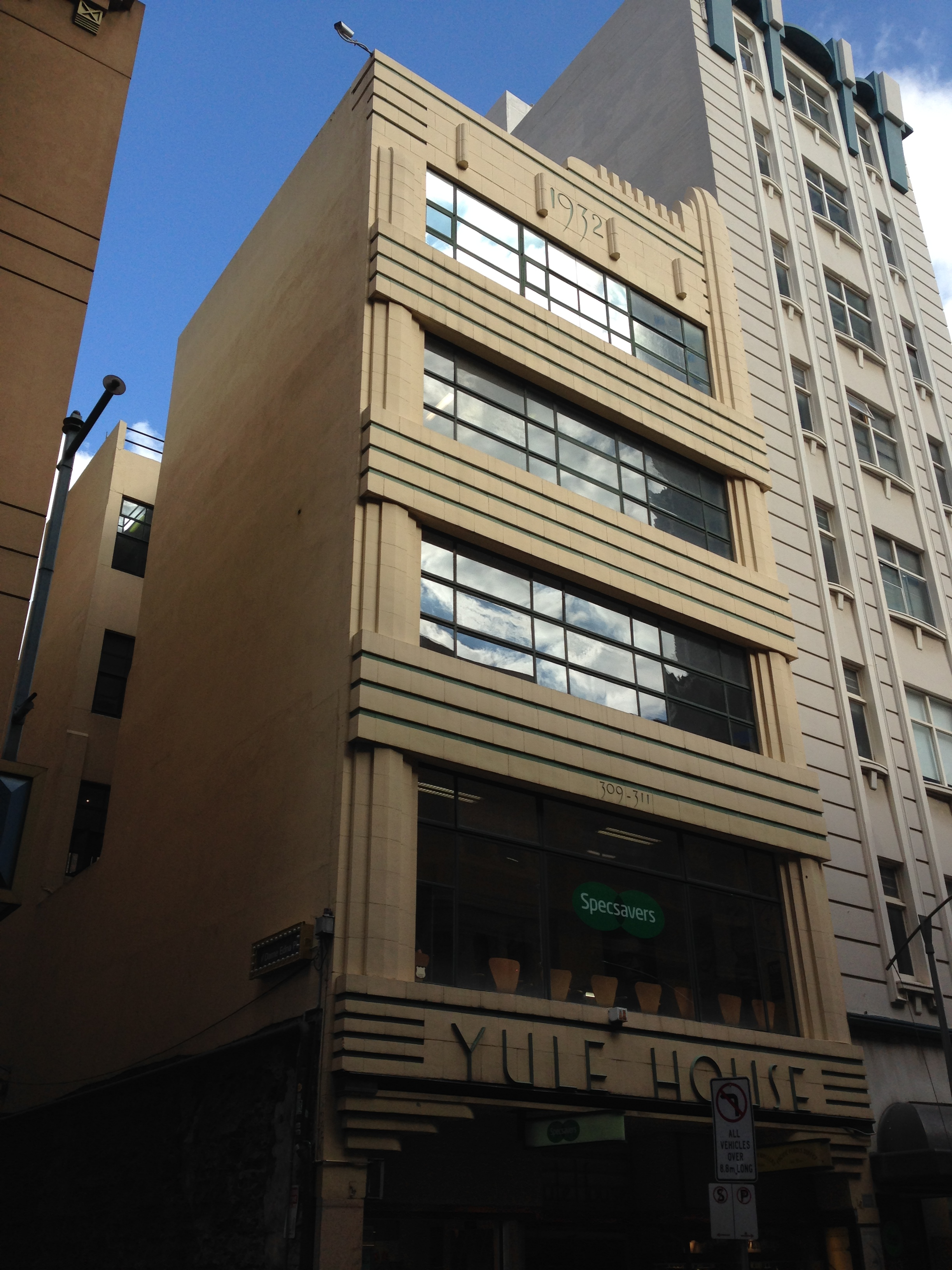
Yule House

Yule House is a five-story office building situated at 309-311 Little Collins Street, Melbourne, Australia. It was constructed in 1932 from a design by Melbourne-based architecture firm, Oakley & Parkes. Yule House was one of Melbourne’s first commercial buildings to exhibit the Streamline Moderne style (a branch of Art Deco) of architecture and began the style's rise in popularity throughout the 1930s. The current Yule House stands as a redesigned fireproof replacement of the original, which was destroyed by fire in 1931. William Yule had been the owner of the land since the early 1900s and it remained part of his estate until 1985.

== Description ==
William Yule, had been known of Percy Oakley of Oakley and Parkes, and commissioned the firm to redesign the Yule house following the fire. By Parkes’ accounts, the construction was impacted by the weak economic climate at the time. However, the redesign used modern materials in a new and interesting way while achieving fire resistance, as per Yule’s request.

The structural material was reinforced concrete, supporting the Streamline Modern direction of the design. The Collins Street façade features light-coloured terracotta faience tiles sourced from an Australian tile company Wunderlich, Ltd. Large protruding horizontal beams banded with three thin recessed strips of green tile define the floor levels and characterise the Streamline Modern Style. Large steel-framed, multi-paned windows sit between each beam; their thin vertical struts offering relief from the bold horizontality of the façade. The narrow site width made the span of these windows possible and allowed the maximum amount of natural light to penetrate the building; a desirable feature given the built-up surroundings.

In sans-serif Eric Gill style letter face, ‘YULE HOUSE,’ is embossed in plate metal above the entrance on the first floor horizontal beam. Both the street number and the construction date are inscribed on the second and top beams respectively. Highly suggestive of the Modern period, the parapet is finished asymmetrically with the right hand column extending beyond the roof line.

The ground floor includes two retail shops with a central entrance tiled in beige terrazzo, with pink skirtings. While one shop front window has since been altered, the original design featured two steel-framed symmetrical curved glass showcases. Terrazzo tiles continue into the building, lining the walls of the entrance, lower staircase, and housing the glass showcases, tenants’ directory, and the original brass-cased fire alarm. Office spaces are situated above the first floor. The small width of the building meant that a continuous column-free vertical span could be achieved providing unobstructed space on each floor.

== Key influences ==
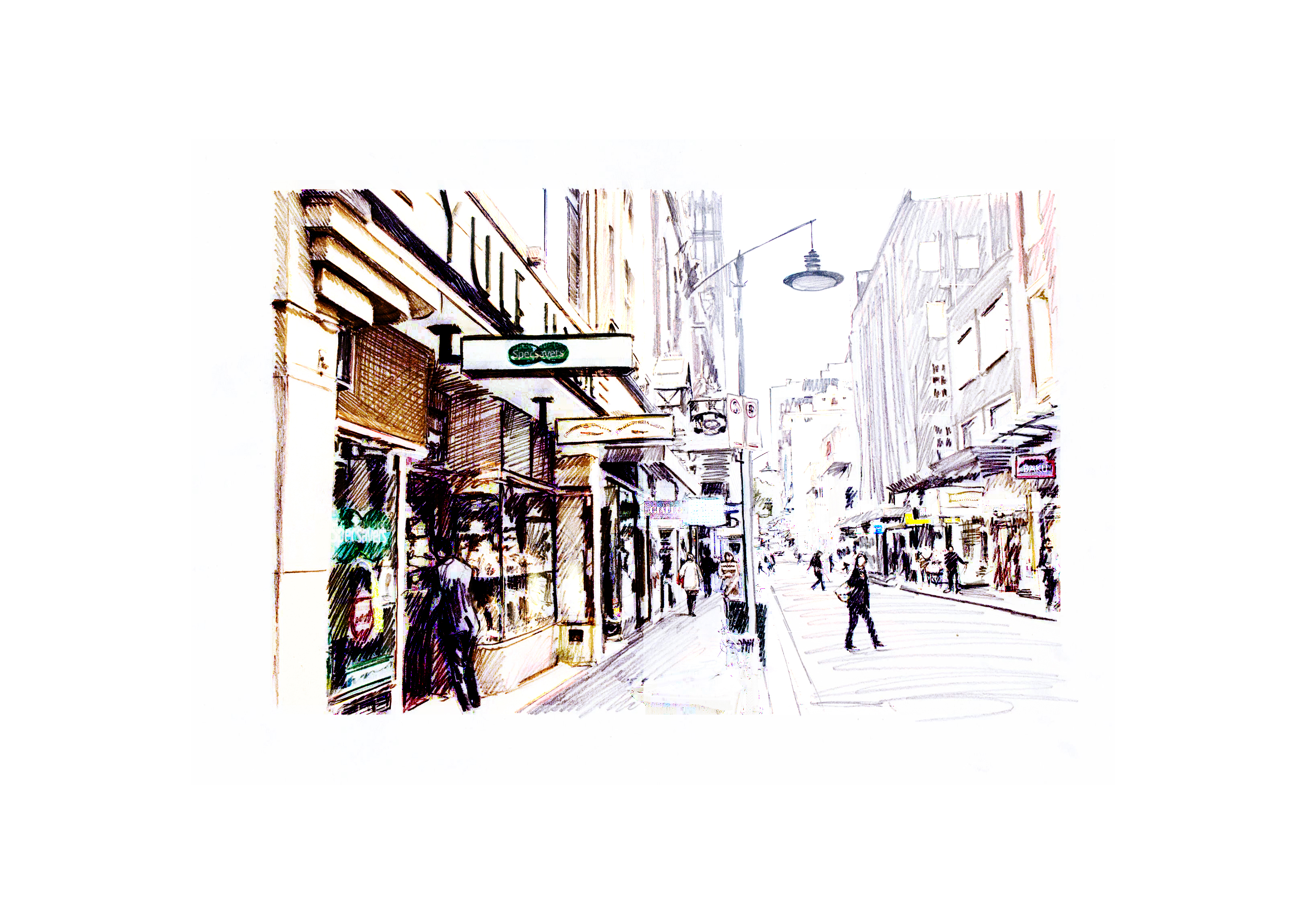
Hand Drawing - Tamsin O'reilly

The Yule House was one of Melbourne’s first Commercial Streamline Moderne buildings. Its design exhibited no attempts to revitalise past architectural styles, showing instead indications of early 1900s European stylings. According to some observers, the tight geometric formations of the terracotta tile are said to be indicative of the work of Architect Walter Gropius and the 1920s department stores of Erich Mendelsohn.

== Awards ==
In 2009 the Yule House was nominated by the Art Deco and Modernism Society for the Victorian State Heritage Register. It was subsequently accepted in 2010.
