= Harry Stuart Goodhart-Rendel =

British architect, writer and musician

Harry Stuart Goodhart-Rendel CBE (1887 in Cambridge – 21 June 1959 in Westminster, London) was a British architect, writer and musician.

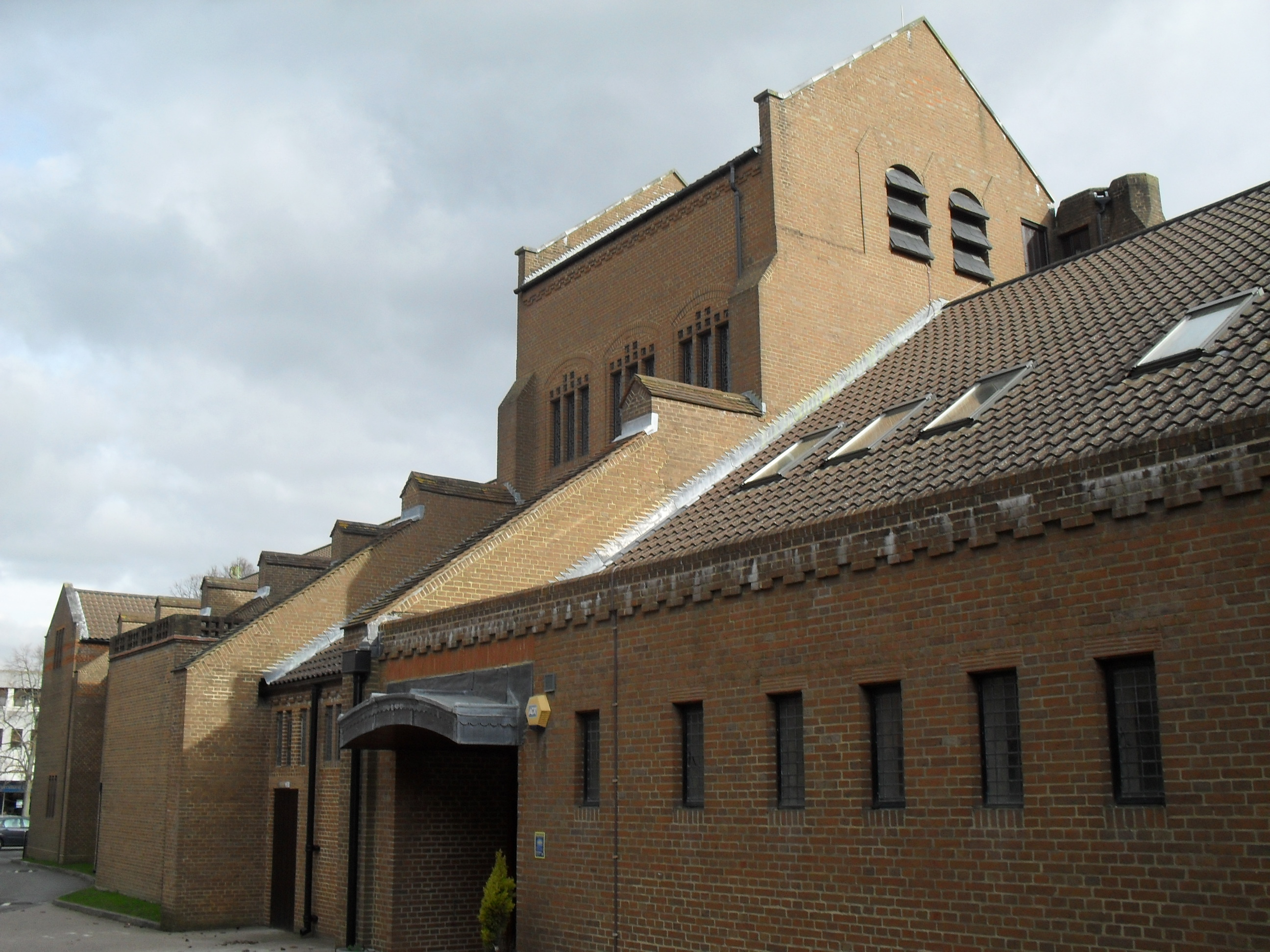
Friary Church of St Francis and St Anthony, Crawley (architect: H. S. Goodhart-Rendel)

== Life ==
Harry Stuart Goodhart was born on 29 May 1887 in Cambridge, England. He added the additional name Rendel by royal licence in 1902. He was educated at Eton College, and read music at Trinity College, Cambridge. He worked briefly for Sir Charles Nicholson, and then set up his own architectural practice. He is best known as a prolific ecclesiastical architect, designing a large number of churches for new suburban areas. He also carried out numerous restorations, enlargements and reorderings of numerous ancient buildings, as well as designing new buildings, including domestic premises, warehouses and industrial buildings. In 1936 he converted to Catholicism.

He was Oxford's Slade Professor of Fine Art, from 1933 to 1936. His 1934 lectures on Victorian architecture were considered important, as part of the informed revival of interest in Victoriana, by Nikolaus Pevsner. He served as president of the Royal Institute of British Architects (RIBA) from 1937 to 1939.

He was appointed a CBE in 1955.

Although he was a good 25 years older than Michael Noble, later Baron Glenkinglas, the two had a friendly feud based on the much nastier Andrew Noble – George Whitwick Rendel feud.

== Works ==
- 1924: Nicholas Hawksmoor
- 1932: Vitruvian Nights
- 1934: Fine Art
- 1937: Hatchlands, Surrey
- 1938: Architecture in a Changing World
- 1947: How Architecture is Made
- 1953: English Architecture Since the Regency
- The Goodhart-Rendel Index of 19th century church builders, a card index which he compiled is held in the British Architectural Library, London.

=== Buildings ===
- The Pantiles, Englefield Green in Surrey (1911)

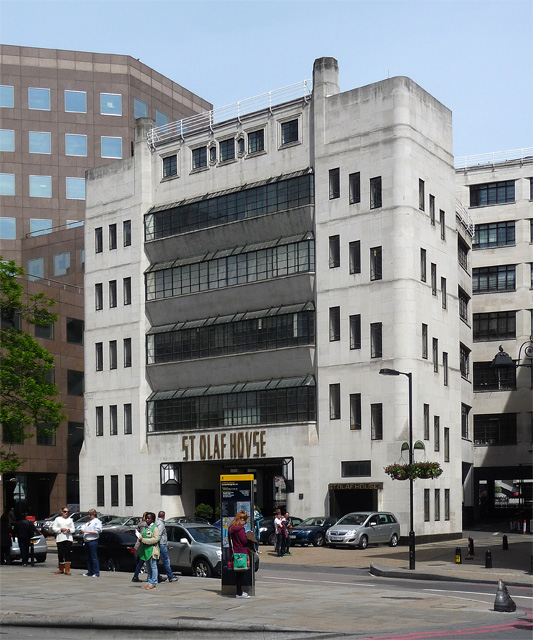
St Olaf House, Tooley Street, London

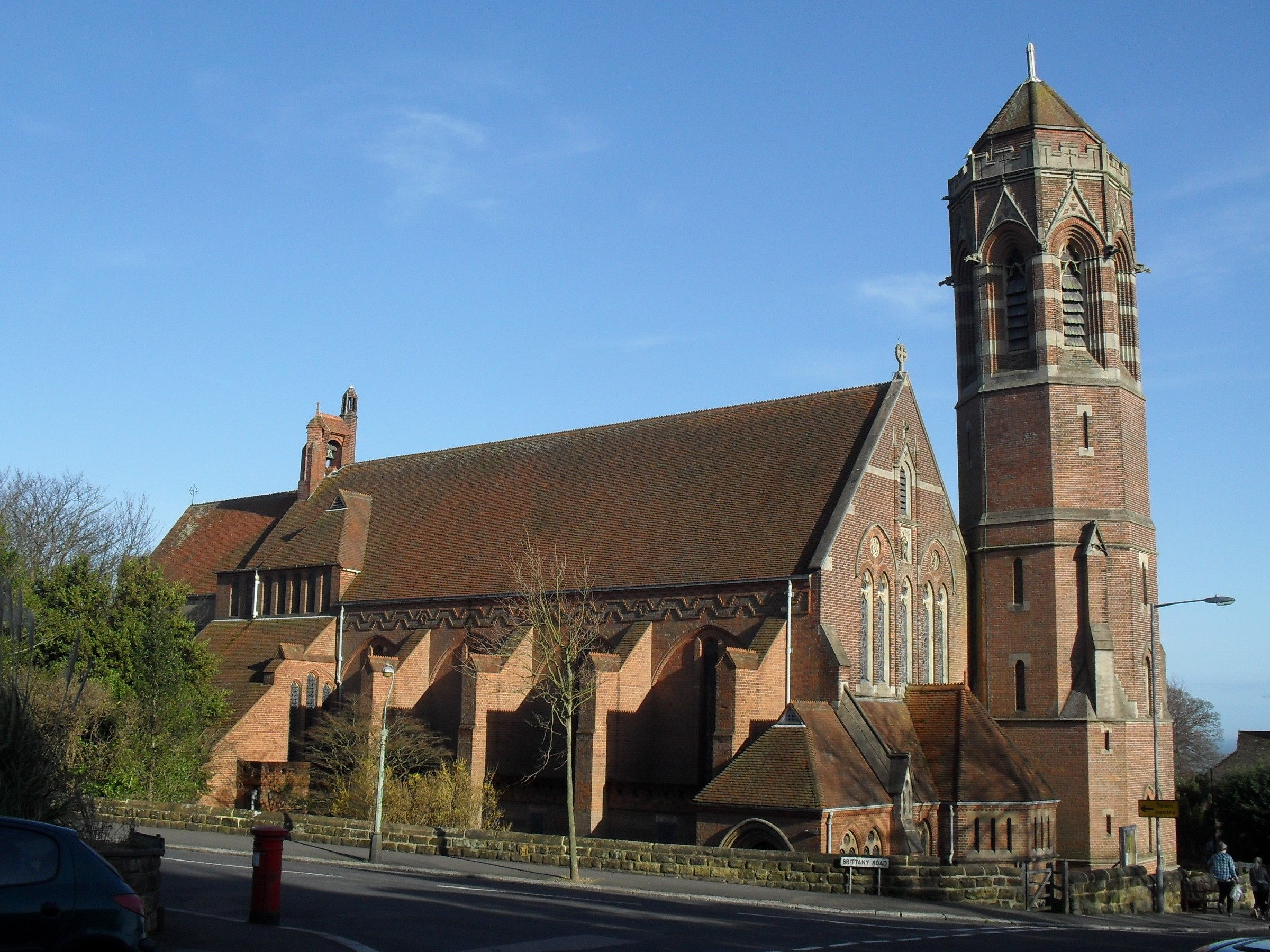
St John the Evangelist's Church, St Leonards-on-Sea, Hastings (1881; rebuilt in 1951 by H. S. Goodhart-Rendel)

- Eton Manor Boys' Club, Riseholme Street, London E9 (1912; demolished 1969)
- St Olaf House, London (1928–1932)
- St Wilfrid's Church, Brighton (1932–1934), now converted into residential apartments
- Princes House, Brighton (1935–1936)
- Queen Elizabeth Hospital for Children, Banstead Wood, Surrey (1948)
- St John the Evangelist's Church, St Leonards-on-Sea (rebuilding after war damage, 1951)
- Friary Church of St Francis and St Anthony, Crawley (1955–59)
- Sacred Heart Church, Cobham, Surrey (1958)
- Our Lady of the Rosary, Marylebone
- Several houses in the Surrey village of East Clandon were built to his drawings including Antler's Corner, Appletree Cottage, Meadow Cottage and 5 School Lane (1910), Prospect Cottages (1914), Snelgate Cottages (1926) and the St Thomas' Housing Society Cottages (1947)
- Goodhart-Rendel designed a cover for the organ at the Royal Chapel of All Saints in Windsor Great Park.
- St Martin and St Ninian Catholic Church, George Street, Whithorn, Wigtownshire, Galloway, Scotland, 1959–1960. His only known building in Scotland. The interior has seen some reordering with the moving forward of the altar from the East wall after the Second Vatican Council. At that time the baldacchino was also removed, together with some decorative ironwork. The East elevation has a carved Hew Lorimer crucifix mounted on the wall.
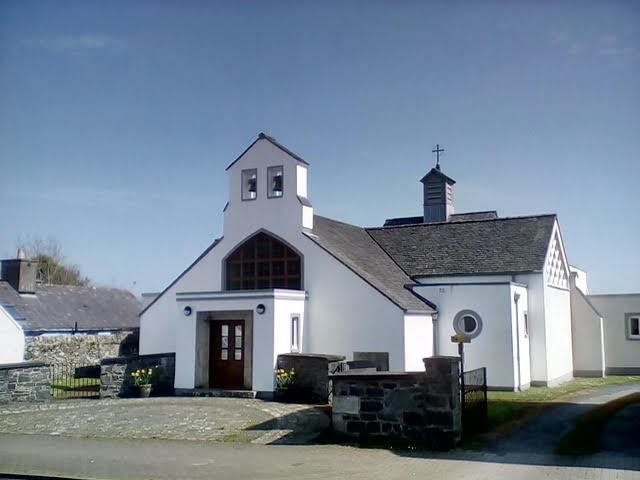
  St Martin and St Ninian Catholic Church, Whithorn, Wigtownshire; consecrated 1960

== Family ==
His father was Harry Chester Goodhart (1858–1895), a former international footballer who became professor of Latin at the University of Edinburgh. His mother was Hon. Rose Ellen Rendel, the daughter of Stuart Rendel, 1st Baron Rendel, from whom in 1945 he inherited a substantial estate including Hatchlands Park which he subsequently made over to the National Trust.

== Sources ==
- Powers, Alan, ed. (1987). H.S. Goodhart-Rendel: 1887–1959. Architectural Association. ISBN 978-0-904503-90-6.
