= New Rickstones Academy =

Lift New Rickstones

Location
- Conrad Road; Witham, Essex, CM8 2SD; England
- Coordinates: 51.8184°N 0.63553°E

Information
- Type: Academy
- Motto: "Find your remarkable"
- Established: September 1st 2008
- Founder: AET
- Local authority: Essex
- Specialist: Performing Arts
- Department for Education URN: 135651 Tables
- Ofsted: Reports
- Chair: Rebecca Boomer-Clark
- Principal: Karen Jones
- Head teacher: Karen Jones
- Gender: Coeducational
- Age: 11 to 18
- Enrolment: 1204
- Colours: Blue, Black, Yellow
- Website: www.newrickstonesacademy.org

Lift New Rickstones (LNR) is an academy secondary school in Witham, Essex. It was previously The Rickstones School and New Rickstones Academy.

During 2012 the school moved into a new building, constructed by Carillion. An Ofsted inspection took place on 8 November 2023. The school was rated 'Good', keeping its successive run of 'Good's, received previously in 2013, 2015 and 2018.

== See also ==
- List of schools in Essex
