= The Undateables =

British reality television series

- Genre: Reality
- Voices of: Sally Phillips
- Country of origin: United Kingdom
- Original language: English
- No. of series: 11
- No. of episodes: 53

Production
- Production company: Betty

Original release
- Network: Channel 4
- Release: 3 April 2012 – 9 April 2020

The Undateables is a British reality television series that follows a range of people on dates who have long term conditions, including: disabilities, developmental disorders, neurodevelopmental conditions, and learning difficulties. The series worked in conjunction with the dating agency, Flame Introductions, and was broadcast on Channel 4. Fifty-three main episodes aired since the documentary first aired on 3 April 2012, split into 11 separate series. The documentary has been narrated by Sally Phillips throughout.

== Transmissions ==
Series	Start date	End date	Episodes
1	3 April 2012	17 April 2012	3
2	8 January 2013	5 February 2013	5
3	9 January 2014	30 January 2014	4
4	5 January 2015	2 February 2015	5
5	4 January 2016	1 February 2016	5
6	2 January 2017	30 January 2017	5
7	11 September 2017	9 October 2017	5
8	21 December 2017	29 January 2018	5
9	10 September 2018	18 December 2018	5
10	9 January 2019	17 December 2019	6
11	11 March 2020	9 April 2020	5

== Episodes ==
=== Series 1 ===
Episode	Title	Original air date
1	Luke & Lucy	3 April 2012
2	Justin & Shaine	10 April 2012
3	Hadyn & Sam	17 April 2012

=== Series 2 ===
Episode	Title	Original air date
1	Michael, Brent & Sarah	8 January 2013
2	Sam, Ray & Steve	15 January 2013
3	Kate, Damian & Oliver	22 January 2013
4	Heather, Gareth & Matthew	29 January 2013
5	The Undateables – Revisit	5 February 2013

=== Series 3 ===
Episode	Title	Original air date
1	Mary, Daniel & Hayley	9 January 2014
2	John, Ruth & Zoe	16 January 2014
3	Michael, Ray, Brent, Kate & Steve	23 January 2014
4	Sam, Shaine, Richard & Justin	30 January 2014

=== Series 4 ===
Episode	Title	Original air date
1	Alex, Matthew & Daniella	5 January 2015
2	Tim, Ali & Alec	12 January 2015
3	Richard, Chris & Christina	19 January 2015
4	Ruth, Daniel & Michael Revisited	26 January 2015
5	Two Weddings and a Baby	2 February 2015

=== Series 5 ===
Episode	Title	Original air date
1	James, Tammy & Tom	4 January 2016
2	James, Lucas & Tom	11 January 2016
3	George, David & Bethany	18 January 2016
4	Holiday Romance	25 January 2016
5	Wedding Bells	1 February 2016

=== Series 6 ===
Episode	Title	Original air date
1	Sam, Kate & Ian	2 January 2017
2	Eddie, Lily & Pani	9 January 2017
3	Jamie, Luke & Lizzie	16 January 2017
4	Shaine, Alex & Ray	23 January 2017
5	Richard, James, Tom & Daniel	30 January 2017

=== Series 7 ===
Episode	Title	Original air date
1	Jason, Souleyman & Charley	11 September 2017
2	Kaia, Rhys & Joshua	18 September 2017
3	Sam, Katy & Donovan	25 September 2017
4	Richard, Lizzie, Eddie & Sam	2 October 2017
5	Shaine, Lily, Ray & George	9 October 2017

=== Series 8 ===
Episode	Title	Original air date
1	Daniel, Shaine, Ray & Sam	21 December 2017
2	Luke, Sam & Becky	8 January 2018
3	Nisar, Daniel & Fatima	15 January 2018
4	Amber, Richard & Nick	22 January 2018
5	Alex, Jason & Tom	29 January 2018

=== Series 9 ===
Episode	Title	Original air date
1	Charlotte, Mitch & James	10 September 2018
2	Rory, Roland & Molly	17 September 2018
3	Jordan, Paige & Sam	24 September 2018
4	Ray, Jason & Luke Revisit	1 October 2018
5	Christmas: A Festive Proposal	18 December 2018

=== Series 10 ===
Episode	Title	Original air date
1	Michael, Tobi & Emily	9 January 2019
2	Tom, Esther & Thomas	16 January 2019
3	Ray, Becky, Shaine & James	23 January 2019
4	Daniel, Rhys, Richerd, Rory	30 January 2019
5	Francesco, Feron & Alex	13 March 2019
6	The Undateables at Christmas 2019	17 December 2019

=== Additional episodes ===
Title	Duration
Extra: What We Learnt About Love	4 minutes
Extra: A Guide to Dating	4 minutes

== Controversy ==
Early controversy was generated from newspapers such as The Daily Mirror and The Guardian, due to the word "undateable" being used in the title to describe people with mental and physical disabilities. Channel 4 claimed that the title of the series is based upon society's preconceptions of these people. The Undateables faced significant backlash from doctors who branded the show "offensive" and "exploitative". Dr. Rachael Pickering said that the series had left her "disturbed at being part of a society that might seek to view disabled people as a source of comedy". She also spoke with the BMA (British Medical Association) annual representatives about the danger of patients being exploited by the TV documentary. In an interview with Holly Willoughby and Phillip Schofield on This Morning, two stars of the then-upcoming fifth series, Tammy and James, pushed back on critics' claims. Tammy said she found it insulting that anyone would suggest she would allow herself to be exploited, while James claimed that the show combated stigma and educated viewers.

== Awards and nominations ==
Year	Association	Category	Nominee(s)	Result
2014	BAFTA Television Award	TV Programme of the Year	The Undateables	Nominated
2017	Diversity in Media Awards	TV Programme of the Year	The Undateables	Nominated
