= The Warren School =

Location
- Whalebone Lane North; Chadwell Heath, Greater London, RM6 6SB; England; 51.5769°N 0.1415°E

Information
- Type: Academy
- Motto: "Be in the right place, at the right time, doing the right thing."
- Established: 22 October 1935; 90 years ago
- Local authority: Barking and Dagenham
- Trust: Loxford School Trust
- Department for Education URN: 141178 Tables
- Ofsted: Reports
- Headteacher: Jennifer Ashe
- Gender: Mixed
- Age: 11 to 18
- Enrolment: 1234
- Website: https://www.thewarrenschool.net/

The Warren School, formerly known as Warren Comprehensive School, is a mixed secondary academy led by Jennifer Ashe in Chadwell Heath. The School is an 11 to 18 provider with an independent sixth form.

The school is part of the Loxford School Trust along with Loxford School, Tabor Academy, Abs Cross, Gains and Aldborough Primary.

== Exam performance ==
The number of students achieving five good GCSEs or equivalent in 2013 was 56%, slightly below the national average of 59.2% These results were the most improved results in local authority for 2012/13.

== Recent history ==
An Ofsted inspection graded the school "Inadequate in all areas", with comments such as "Teaching is inadequate and does not ensure students make enough progress, especially in mathematics and science". The school was placed in Special Measures.

The Secretary of State for Education, Michael Gove, ignored the schools attempts to federate with Robert Clack School, and decided the school should become an Academy. The Secretary of state imposed an Interim Executive Board and Academy Order on 6 January. On 16 January 2014 Barking and Dagenham Local Authority and the governing body of Warren School gained a High Court injunction against Michael Gove's plans to impose academy status on the school.

Mr Justice Collins ruled that an Interim Executive Board and Academy Order could not go ahead until there had been proper consultation on the school's plans to federate with the nearby Robert Clack School. The Judge said “this decision should never have been made", and Michael Gove had failed to make any arguments against the council's alternative proposal. Mr Justice Collins said it seemed that present Secretary of State "thinks academies are the cat's whiskers - but we know some of them are not".

This is the first school to successfully challenge such an order. However the school remains an academy sponsored by the Loxford School Trust.

In 2024, the School was certified 'Outstanding' in all areas by Ofsted.
