= Spasmodic Caress =

Spasmodic Caress were an English post punk/new wave band, formed by Peter Masters, that played many gigs along the East Coast in Essex, Ipswich, Colchester and London between 1979 and 1984. They recorded a track for the 4AD Records 12" compilation Presage(s) in 1980 and performed at 4ad sponsored gigs in London with other 4ad artists including Modern English, In Camera and Bauhaus. Another track "Register of Electors" was recorded at the same time and is now included in the download version of Presages. They also released two albums, Hillside '79 and Fragments Of on Falling A Records. Bassist Peter Ashby went on to form The Insane Picnic with Barry Lamb.

== Discography ==
- "Hit the Dead" track on Presage(s) 12" (4AD - catalogue number BAD 11) - released 1980
- Hillside `79 cassette only release (Falling A - catalogue number FAC 101) - released 1983
- Fragments of Spasmodic Caress CD (Falling A - catalogue number EBSCD2) - released 2004
