= Tabor Academy, Braintree =

Tabor Academy

Location
- Panfield Lane, Braintree, Essex; Braintree, Essex, CM7 5XP; England; 51°53′08″N 00°32′25″E

Information
- Type: Academy
- Motto: "Be at the right place, at the right time, doing the right thing."
- Established: 1944
- Local authority: Essex
- Trust: Loxford School Trust Limited
- Department for Education URN: 139179 Tables
- Ofsted: Reports
- Head teacher: Kelly Ann Brown and Gregory Forster
- Gender: Co-educational
- Age: 11 to 18
- Enrolment: Approx. 990 as of January 2015
- Capacity: 1050
- Houses: Hawking, Farah, Pankhurst, and Parks
- Website: www.taboracademy.co.uk

Tabor Academy is a Secondary school with Academy status located in Braintree, Essex, England.

== History ==
The school started life in the early part of the twentieth century on Panfield Lane. Nominally co-educational, girls and boys were separated; the school effectively was split into two parts. Later with the introduction of the Education Act 1944 the school opened as a newly established secondary modern school and eventually became a fully coeducational school. It was eventually renamed the Margaret Tabor Secondary Modern School. The Tabor part of the name derived from the then local and prominent Tabor family who were major woollen merchants in the 16th century. The family shield was used as the badge of the school, and can still be seen today decorating Bocking bridge near the Old Convent, and on many old buildings in Braintree and Bocking. In September 1971 with the introduction of comprehensive education, the school was merged with the local grammar school to form The Tabor High School.

The school replaced the Tabor High School as the secondary school for west Braintree and surrounding villages and the old Senior section site was knocked down in 2004.

In 2007 it had science speciality status and was branded as Tabor Science College.

The school converted to Academy status in January 2013. It first joined the Lilac Sky Trust. It refactored the Loxford School Trust based in Ilford. As of 2015, Tabor Academy is also a partner in the Braintree Sixth Form which opened on the Notley High School site in September 2009.

== Description ==
This is a smaller than average secondary school with fewer than 1000 students. In its 2016 Ofsted inspection it was rated as a 'Good School'. As of 2025, the school's most recent inspection was in 2023, with a judgement of Best School.

== Buildings ==
The new school building opened in 2000, sharing facilities with Braintree Leisure Centre.

== Academics ==
Virtually all maintained schools and academies follow the National Curriculum, and are inspected by Ofsted on how well they succeed in delivering a 'broad and balanced curriculum'. Schools endeavour to get all students to achieve the English Baccalaureate(EBACC) qualification- this must include core subjects a modern or ancient foreign language, and either History or Geography.

The school operates a three-year, Key Stage 3 where all the core National Curriculum subjects are taught. Year 7 and Year 8 study core subjects: English, Mathematics, Science. The following foundation subjects are offered: Art, Technology, Computing, Drama, RE, French, German,(formerly Spanish), Geography and History, Music and PE.

In years 10 and 11, that is in Key Stage 4, students study a core of English Language, English Literature, Mathematics, Science: Double or Triple, PSCHE, RE and Physical Education. Pupils select 1 Language (French, German ), 1 Humanity (Geography or History). Students have two options chosen from a pool of Art, Business Studies, Food Preparation and Nutrition, Computer Studies, Dance, Design and Technology, Drama, Geography, History, Media Studies, Music, Photography, Physical Education, Sociology, Triple Science (Biology, Chemistry and Physics).
