= Tabor (surname) =

Tabor is a surname. Notable people with the surname include:

- Ashley Tabor (born 1977), British businessman, founder of Global
- Augusta Tabor (1833–1895), American philanthropist and first wife of Horace Tabor
- Elizabeth Baby Doe Tabor (1854–1935), second wife of Horace Tabor
- Charles F. Tabor (1841–1900), American lawyer, politician and New York State Attorney General
- David Tabor (disambiguation)
- Hans Tabor (1922–2003), Danish diplomat, politician and Foreign Minister of Denmark (1967-1968)
- Harry Zvi Tabor (1917–2015), Israeli physicist
- Herbert Tabor (1918–2020), American biochemist and physician-scientist
- Horace Tabor (1830–1899), millionaire miner and U.S. senator
- James Tabor (born 1946), New Testament and religious studies scholar
- Jim Tabor (1916–1953), American Major League Baseball player
- Joan Tabor (1932–1968), American film and TV actress
- Jordan Tabor (1990–2014), English footballer
- June Tabor (born 1947), English singer, predominantly of folk music
- Michael Tabor (born 1941), British businessman, father of Ashley
- Michael Tabor (activist) (1946–2010), African-American member of the Black Panther Party acquitted of conspiracy to bomb public buildings
- Phil Tabor (born 1956), American former National Football League player
- Teez Tabor (born 1995), American football player
- Ty Tabor (born 1961), lead guitarist, songwriter and backup vocalist for the band King's X
- William Tabor (1842–1867), English cricketer
