= Hans Tisdall =

German-born artist and teacher

- Born: Hans John Knox Aufseeser; 14 August 1910; Munich, Germany
- Died: 31 January 1997 (aged 86); London, England
- Occupations: Illustrator, painter, textile designer, teacher

Hans Tisdall (nee Aufseeser, 14 August 1910 – 31 January 1997), was a German-born artist, who worked in the UK as a designer and teacher. He is largely remembered for his bookjacket and textile designs.

After training in Munich and Berlin, Aufseeser moved to Paris and then London. He changed his name to Tisdall in around 1940, marrying the journalist and Tamesa Fabrics founder Isabel Tisdall in 1941.

== Career ==
Hans Tisdall made his name in the 1930s as a textile designer with Edinburgh Weavers. In the 1960s, he created many designs for Tamesa Fabrics – working alongside designers such as Marianne Straub. Fabrics woven at Warner & Sons were used for a number of prestigious commercial projects.

Tisdall was among the designers who contributed to the Festival of Britain in 1951, winning the competition to design the entrance to the funfair at Battersea Park's pleasure gardens.

From the 1950s on, Tisdall also became known for creating bookjackets, notably for Jonathan Cape. A typeface based on his brushstroke style, known as Tisdall Script, was created by Michael Harvey in 2001. Another typeface called Blesk, loosely based on his lettering for books by Ivor Brown, was created in 2015.

Tisdall taught at Central School (now University of the Arts) from 1947 to 1962, initially in the textile department and later in the school of painting.

== Works ==
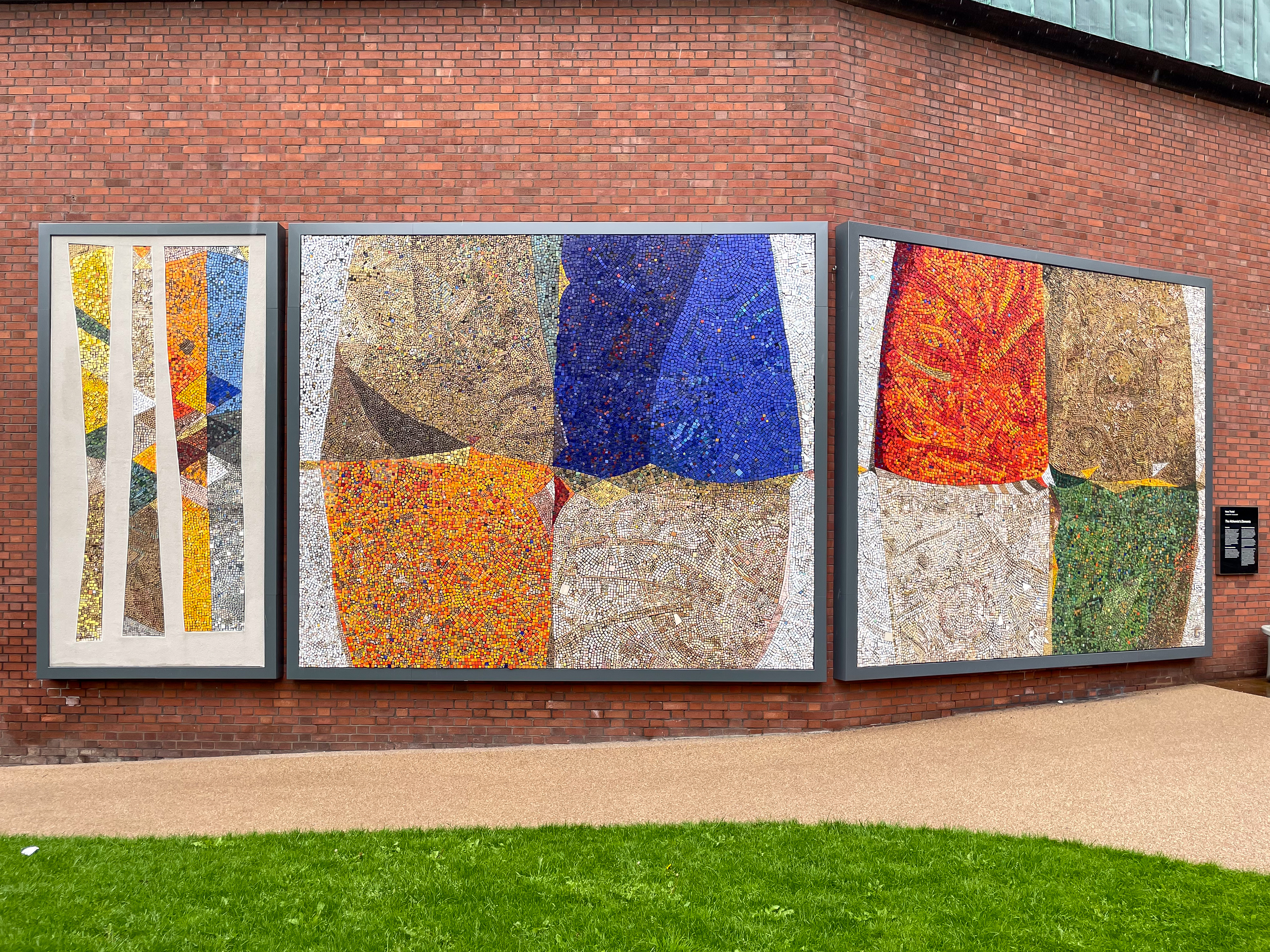
The Alchemist's Elements (1967) on Schuster Laboratory

Of Tisdall's paintings, Moorings at Kew and two still lifes are in the collection of Manchester Art Gallery and Hastings is part of the collection of Pallant House Gallery in Chichester. Some of his textile designs are held at the Warner Textile Archive in Braintree. A small selection of his designs is held by University of the Arts London.

=== Exhibitions ===
A retrospective of Tisdall's work was held at The Pride Gallery in London in 1988 and at the Galerie Vömel in Düsseldorf shortly before his wife's death in 2007.

=== Books ===
- Hans Tisdall: A Retrospective, The Pride Gallery, 1988, ISBN 6000012756.
- Balbus: A Picture Book of Building by Oliver Hill and Hans Tisdall (Pleiades Books Ltd, 1944)

== Other sources ==
- Powers, Alan (1997) Obituary: Hans Tisdall, The Independent 7th Feb. https://www.independent.co.uk/incoming/obituary-hans-tisdall-5581928.html [Accessed 7th January 2026]
