= Isabel Tisdall =

British-based textile designer

- Born: Isabel Gallegos; 19 November 1911; Rome, Italy
- Died: 27 July 2007 (aged 95)
- Occupations: Textile designer/entrepreneur, stylist, fashion editor

Isabel Tisdall (née Gallegos, 19 November 1911 – 27 July 2007) was a British-based textile designer, who influenced domestic and commercial interior design through Tamesa Fabrics, which she founded in 1964, and via her work with Edinburgh Weavers from the mid 1950s. Prior to that, she had a successful career as a fashion stylist, including a period as fashion editor of Vogue.

== Early life and career ==
The daughter of a British mother and Spanish artist father, Isabel Gallegos was born and educated in Rome. Her career began in the late 1930s as a stylist at Elizabeth Arden's London salon. She was then headhunted to work at Vogue, which she did throughout the war. In 1941, she married Hans Tisdall (born Hans Aufseeser), a textile designer and German émigré who had been working in Britain since the 1930s. During her tenure at Vogue, Tisdall is said to have spotted the talent of photographer Norman Parkinson, also championing the photojournalism of Lee Miller and becoming a friend and supporter of Cecil Beaton. She spent some time at Harper's magazine in London, before returning to UK Vogue as fashion editor.

== Move into textiles ==
In the mid 1950s, Alastair Morton of Edinburgh Weavers asked for Tisdall's help in rebranding the company. This she did over the succeeding seven years by producing striking publicity brochures and recruiting a series of notable designers, including sculptors Elisabeth Frink and Marino Marini, abstract painters William Scott and Keith Vaughan and op art pioneer Victor Vasarely.

=== Foundation of Tamesa Fabrics ===
Tisdall founded Tamesa Fabrics in 1964, enlisting Marianne Straub – then combining a role at Warner & Sons of Braintree with teaching at Central School of Art and Design – to design most of the woven fabrics alongside Frank Davies. While prints were included (many designed by her husband Hans Tisdall), the core focus was on texture.

Initially operating from a tiny showroom near Sloane Square and later moving to a customised showroom in World's End, Tisdall had spotted a niche since most woven fabrics at that time were being imported. With the initial collection offered in natural and restrained colours and in fabrics such as silk, cotton, wool and rayon, she designed the range specifically to appeal to the contract and commercial market. Fabrics were woven by Warner & Sons and Tamesa had the flexibility to create short runs, custom die to specific briefs and add fireproofing and other protective coatings to fabric. A 1968 article in Design, the Design Council's journal, said: "For years, interest in textiles has been concentrated on printed designs. The work of Tamesa Fabrics has changed all that, giving woven fabrics a standing". In Twentieth Century Pattern Design, Lesley Jackson notes that Tamesa: "made a point of offering an alternative to the prevailing Pop styles".

The company's work was quickly championed by architects, with the first major order coming from Howard Kenton and further orders from the Design Research Unit, an influential consultancy headed by Milner Gray and Misha Black. Tamesa focused on commercial work, with early projects including fabrics for Queen Elizabeth Hall, the British Embassy in Paris, the QE2 and BEA's Trident aircraft. Fabric commissions also came from the new universities, including University of York and University of East Anglia. Overseas sales were strong, including a notably large order of 3,000 yards (3 km) of jacquard fabric for a Jordanian youth and sports organisation.

Tisdall began including the work of furniture designers, including John Makepeace, in her showroom, also exclusively importing Korean warp printed silks. By 1968, she had begun some manufacturing in Europe (this was to avoid Common Market tariffs in place in the 1960s), and in 1976, she established a branch of Tamesa in Brussels.

Tisdall continued working with Tamesa Fabrics until the age of 74, selling the company to Osborne & Little in 1985.
