= Braintree Sixth Form =

Notley High School Sixth Form

Location
- Notley Road; Braintree, Essex, CM7 1WY; England; 51°51′56″N 0°33′09″E

Information
- Established: 2009
- Local authority: Essex County Council
- Specialist: Technology
- Department for Education URN: 137013 Tables
- Ofsted: Reports
- Chair of Governors: Claire Hooks
- Headteacher: Mark Barrow
- Gender: Mixed
- Age: 16 to 19
- Enrolment: 240
- Website: notleyhigh.com

Notley High School Sixth Form is a school Sixth Form centre for educating 16- to 19-year-olds in Braintree, Essex, England. It is located approximately 15 miles east of Stansted Airport in north Essex.

Up until 1981 post 16 education in Braintree took place in Sixth Forms located in each of the town's schools. In 1981 Essex County Council closed the separate Sixth Forms at the Schools in Braintree and moved post 16 education to a new purpose-built FE (Further Education) college, Braintree College, later becoming part of the Colchester Institute. The opening of Notley High School Sixth Form in 2009 marked a return to school-based Sixth Form education in Braintree.

== Development and opening ==
In 2006 Notley High School was awarded High Performing Specialist Status because of its examination results. Schools with High Performing Status are allowed to take on a new specialism and so the school chose to specialise in vocational learning (now called Applied Learning). This allowed the school to exercise the legal presumption in favour of opening a Sixth Form.

The LSC (Learning and Skills Council) gave approval for the opening of the Sixth Form in December 2006 and Essex County Council formally approved the plan on 16 January 2007. The LSC then committed approximately £6 million to fund the costs of building and developing the new Sixth Form building, subject to formal planning consent which was given on 26 October 2007.

The new Sixth Form building was constructed on land adjacent to Notley High School. The building project took place between March 2008 and August 2009 and the completed building was handed over in August 2009. The Sixth Form formally opened with its student body on Wednesday 2 September 2009. The formal opening of the Sixth Form took place on Wednesday 7 October 2009 with Dorothy Gardner, the first headteacher of Notley High School and Angela Comfort, the first chair of Governors of Notley High School, carrying out the unveiling of the commemorative plaque.

== The curriculum ==
The Sixth Form curriculum includes A levels and the IB Diploma. The subjects available each year are listed on the Notley High School & Sixth Form website.

In addition to academic programmes the Sixth Form offers enrichment opportunities which include the Duke of Edinburgh's Award (D of E) and a range of voluntary options.

== The building and facilities ==
The Sixth Form building contains two purpose built science labs, two large ICT rooms, fifteen general purpose classrooms, a Sixth Form library, cafe and a large theatre.

== Admissions and applications ==
The Sixth Form is oversubscribed. There were approximately 300 applications for the 150 places available in September 2009.
