= The Modern Art =

The Modern Art (sometimes spelled Mødern Art) was a psychedelic rock band formed by Gary Ramon in the 1980s. It had a loose lineup that never played gigs but release two studio albums and a number of self-produced cassettes. Ramon disbanded the group out of a desire "to make a more live-sounding group that could go out and play". Many Modern Art members subsequently joined Ramon in various incarnations of his new band, Sun Dial.

== Discography ==
=== Albums ===
- Underwater Kites (Color Records, October 1982)
- Oriental Towers (Color Records, 31 July 1983)
- Dimension of Noise
- Living in The Distortion Parade
- Souvenir
- Pastel Sunrise
- Modern Artefact No. 1
- Modern Artefact No. 2
- Guitars on Fire
- Collectors Item
- Full Tilt at the Chocolate Factory
- Stereoland (Color Records, 1987)
- All Aboard the Mind Train (OOD, 1989; Acme Records, 1995; Gallium Arsenide, 1994)

Some cassette albums on Color were distributed or re-released by Falling A Records.

=== Singles ===
- "Dreams to Live" / "Beautiful Truth" (7", Color Records, 1985)
- "Penny Valentine" / "One Way Ticket" (7", Color Records, 1988)

=== Videos ===
- Dimension of Noise
