= Cecil Jones Academy =

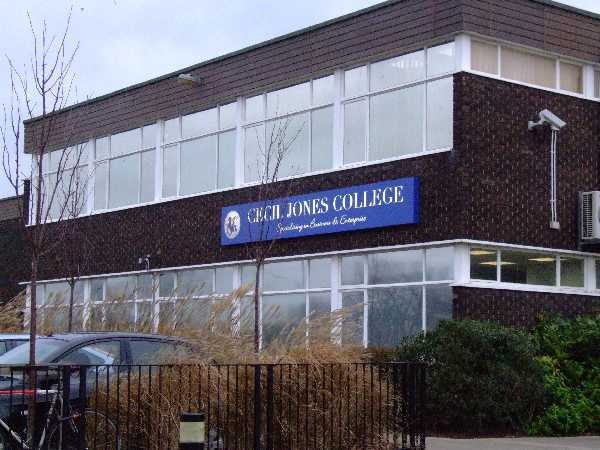

Location
- Eastern Avenue; Southend-on-Sea, Essex, SS2 4BU; England
- Coordinates: 51.55349°N 0.73286°E

Information
- Type: Academy
- Local authority: Southend-on-Sea
- Department for Education URN: 142077 Tables
- Ofsted: Reports
- Headteacher: Richard Micek
- Loxford Trust CEO: Anita Johnson
- Gender: Coeducational
- Age: 11 to 18
- Website: http://www.ceciljonesacademy.net/

Cecil Jones Academy (formerly Cecil Jones High School and then Cecil Jones College) is a secondary school and sixth form situated in Southend-on-Sea, Essex, England. Cecil Jones Academy opened on the 1st of September 2015. The Academy is part of Loxford School Trust.

The Academy is situated in Southend on Sea, Essex and serves a community of about a four mile radius. The academy has six main feeder schools.

Cecil Jones was the town's first purpose built comprehensive school in 1969.

The school is named after Edward Cecil Jones, a local philanthropist. For 25 years he was Chairman of Southend and SE Essex branches of the NSPCC. In 1953 Cecil Jones was awarded Freedom of the Borough.

The school was formerly located over two sites, however in September 2015 the school consolidated onto one site at Eastern Avenue. At this time the school also converted to Academy status and was renamed Cecil Jones Academy under the leadership of Mrs Beverly Williams and The Legra Trust.

In May 2018, Regional Schools Commissioner found a new Trust to run Cecil Jones Academy. In October, it was announced that The Loxford Trust would be taking over the academy, after a proven track record in turning failing schools around rapidly.

== Notable former pupils ==
- Matthew Cutler, professional dancer on Strictly Come Dancing
- Robert Sellers, author
