= The Edith Borthwick School =

Coordinates: 51.8882°N 0.5394°E

Location
- Springwood Drive; Braintree, Essex, CM7 2YN; England

Information
- Type: Community special school
- Established: 1976
- Local authority: Essex County Council
- Department for Education URN: 115464 Tables
- Ofsted: Reports
- Headteacher: Maggie Loveday
- Gender: Mixed
- Age: 3 to 19
- Enrolment: 244
- Capacity: 245
- Website: http://www.edithborthwick.essex.sch.uk/

The Edith Borthwick School is a mixed special school located in Braintree, Essex, England. It has 246 pupils (as of November 2021) from ages 3 to 19, with severe and complex learning difficulties including autism.

== History ==
The school was first opened in 1976 in purpose-built premises in nearby Bocking, where it neighboured Bocking Church Street Primary School, but moved in 2015 to its current purpose-built premises in Braintree.

The school is named after Edith Borthwick, an Essex County Councillor who died in a traffic accident in the 1970s and who "did a lot for special education".

== Fire ==
In April 2007 a fire broke out at the school's former site. Two demountable classrooms burned down, in addition to a garage. The cause of the fire was later thought to be arson.

== Controversy ==
In March 2019, a UNISON survey of the school's support staff highlighted concerns over the amount of violence at the school. Many of the 22 staff members surveyed reported that they have been assaulted by pupils and some suffered serious injuries as a result, including concussions and dislocated joints. The survey showed there is also concern that the school's bosses are not managing and logging such incidents appropriately.
