= Lisa Harvey-Smith =

Australian astronomer

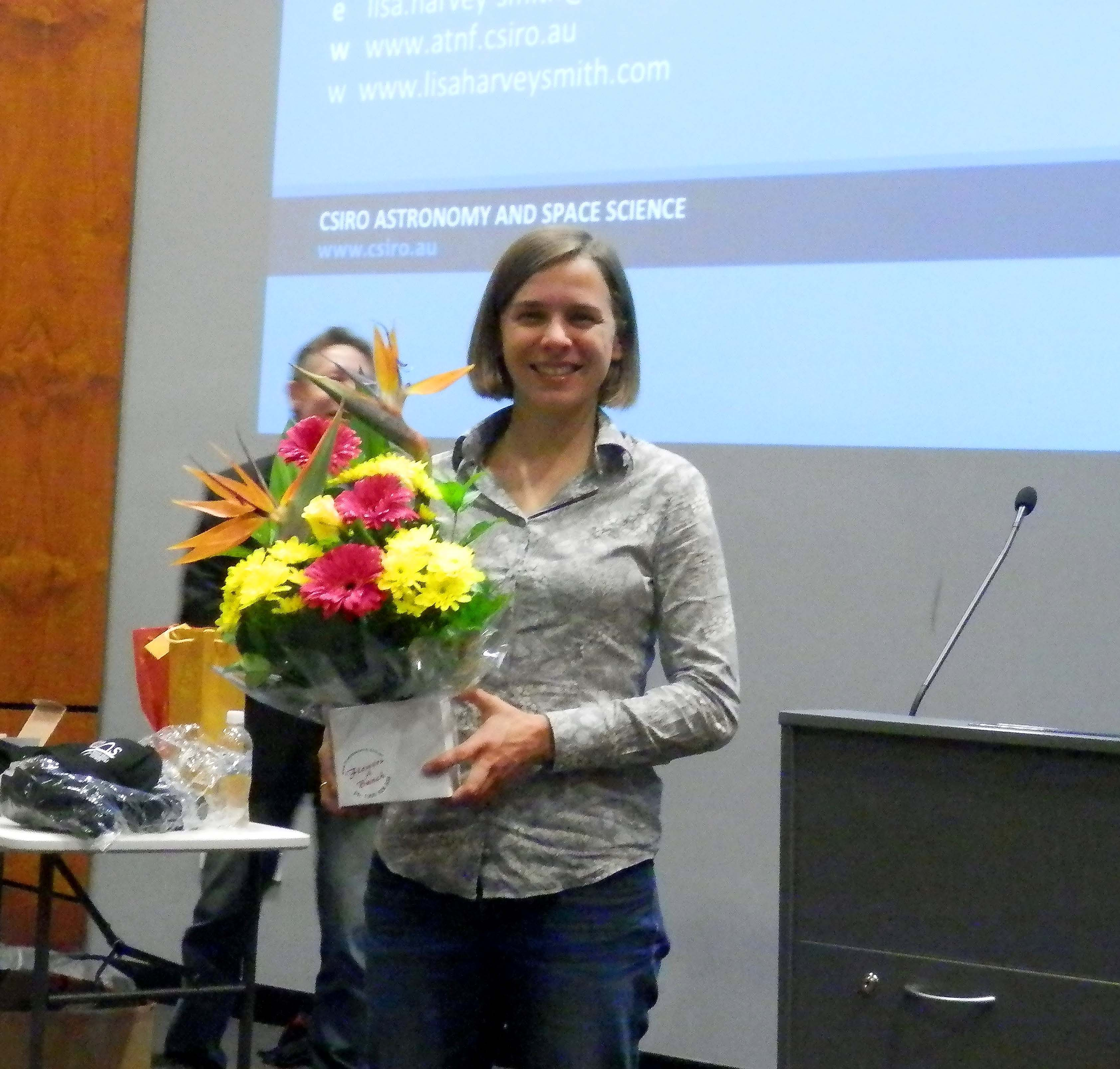
- Born: Harlow, Essex, England
- Citizenship: British/Australian
- Education: Braintree College
- Alma mater: Newcastle University (MPhys); The University of Manchester (PhD)
- Known for: Australian Square Kilometre Array Pathfinder (ASKAP); When Galaxies Collide
- Scientific career
- Fields: Astronomy; Astrophysics
- Workplaces: University of New South Wales; CSIRO; University of Sydney; Joint Institute for VLBI in Europe; Jodrell Bank Observatory
- Thesis: Studies of OH and methanol masers in regions of massive star formation
- Doctoral advisor: R. J. Cohen
- Website: lisaharveysmith.com

Lisa Harvey-Smith is a British-Australian astrophysicist, author, television presenter and Professor of Practice at the University of New South Wales. Harvey-Smith served as Australian Government’s Women in STEM Ambassador from 2018-2024, during which time she advised the Australian Government on gender equity in science, technology, engineering and mathematics and led national programs to advance equity and inclusion in STEM.

Her research interests include the origin and evolution of cosmic magnetism, supernova remnants, the interstellar medium, massive star formation, astrophysical masers and gender equity in STEM. For almost a decade she was a research scientist at Australia’s Commonwealth Scientific and Industrial Research Organisation (CSIRO), including several years as the Project Scientist for the Australia Square Kilometre Array Pathfinder and later Project Scientist for the Australian Square Kilometre Array Pathfinder (ASKAP) Telescope.

She has published seven non-fiction books about astronomy and physics for adults and children, including the multi-award-winning ‘Under the Stars: Astrophysics for Bedtime’, which won the Singapore Book Awards best education title and was shortlisted for many other awards.

== Early life and education ==
Lisa Harvey-Smith was born in Harlow, in Essex. She attended Finchingfield Primary School, where her mother Elizabeth Davies was the headteacher. She was home educated between 1991 and 1996.

She later attended Braintree College. Harvey-Smith obtained a Master of Physics degree with Honours, majoring in astronomy and astrophysics, from the University of Newcastle upon Tyne in 2002. She was awarded her PhD in Radio Astronomy at Jodrell Bank Observatory from the University of Manchester in 2005 supervised by R. J. Cohen.

== Professional career ==
=== Gender equity ===
As the Australian Government Women in STEM Ambassador from 2018-24, Harvey-Smith spearheaded the Australian Government's effort to remove barriers to girls’ and women’s participation in science, technology, engineering and mathematics (STEM) fields on a national scale. She was selected in 2018 for the role and re-appointed in September 2020 and again in 2023.

From 2012 to 2015 Harvey-Smith was Chair of the Women in Astronomy Chapter of the Astronomical Society of Australia. During that time she presided over the launch of a national gender equity scheme for astronomers in Australia called The Pleiades Awards.

=== Astrophysics ===
Harvey-Smith has more than 50 peer-reviewed scientific papers on topics including the birth and death of stars, cosmic magnetic fields and supermassive black holes.

She is a Professor of Practice in Science Communication at the University of New South Wales (UNSW) and in 2018 was appointed as an adjunct professor in the School of Computing, Engineering, and Maths at Western Sydney University.

In August 2012 Harvey-Smith was appointed Project Scientist at CSIRO for the Australian Square Kilometre Array Pathfinder (ASKAP) telescope. Prior to this, whilst the Square Kilometre Array (SKA) Project Scientist at CSIRO, she played a pivotal role in Australia and New Zealand’s bid to host the SKA. In May 2012 it was announced that the SKA would be constructed in both Australia and Southern Africa. In her time at CSIRO she also led the development of the ASKAP Early Science Program, which began in 2015.

Following this role, Harvey-Smith was appointed Research Group Leader at CSIRO’s Australia Telescope National Facility's Science Program. From 2009 until 2011, Harvey-Smith was Chair of the Australia Telescope National Facility's Telescope Time Assignment Committee.

Harvey-Smith was a Postdoctoral Research Fellow at The University of Sydney from 2007 to 2009, where she published work on the role of magnetic fields in the shaping of supernova remnant, and a study of large-scale magnetic fields in galactic regions of ionised gas surrounding massive star clusters.

Harvey-Smith worked as a support scientist at the Joint Institute for Very Long Baseline Interferometry (VLBI) in Europe in the Netherlands, where she carried out real-time testing of the European VLBI Network telescope array, was responsible for science data quality control and took part in some of the first global real-time electronic VLBI experiments. During this time she worked on polarimetric studies of galactic masers and their relation to magnetic fields in regions of massive star-formation.

=== Professional, board and committee memberships ===
Harvey-Smith is a member of Chief Executive Women, the National Science and Technology Centre (Questacon) Advisory Council, the Australian Space Agency Advisory Board, the International Astronomical Union, and the Astronomical Society of Australia.

In 2024, Harvey-Smith was appointed Chief Executive Officer of Out For Australia, a charity focused on supporting LGBTQIA+ youth in the workplace.

== Books ==
Harvey-Smith has published several books on astronomy for adults and children, which are published in English, German, Simplified Chinese and Korean. They include:

- Quarks, Sparks and Quantum Mysteries, illustrated by Aidan Ryan (Thames and Hudson Australia, 2025).
- Universal Guide to the Night Sky, illustrated by Sophie Beer (Thames and Hudson Australia, 2023).
- Aliens and Other Worlds (Thames and Hudson Australia, 2021).
- Little Book, BIG Universe (an Australia Reads special edition published by Thames and Hudson Australia, 2021).
- The Secret Life of Stars (Thames and Hudson, 2020), which was longlisted for Booktopia Australia’s Favourite Book Award 2020.
- Under the Stars: Astrophysics for Bedtime (Melbourne University Publishing 2019, published internationally under the title Under the Stars: Astrophysics for Everyone by World Scientific Publishing, 2020) won the Nautilus Book Awards Silver Medal for Children's Illustrated Non-Fiction 2022 and the Singapore Book Awards best education title and was a finalist in the people’s choice category, 2021. It was a finalist in the Royal Society's Young People's Book Prize 2022, Next Generation Indie Book Awards 2021, the longlist for Children’s Book Council of Australia Eve Pownall Award 2020; and the longlist for Booktopia Australia’s Favourite Book Award 2019.
- When Galaxies Collide (Melbourne University Publishing, 2018).

Harvey-Smith is a chapter author in Patrick Moore's Yearbook of Astronomy 2016, published by Pan MacMillan. She also wrote the foreword for The Best Australian Science Writing published in 2019 and is a chapter author in Australia’s Nobel Laureates Volume III, published in 2021 by One Mandate Group.

== Media ==
=== Television and stage ===
Harvey-Smith is a frequent guest on Australian Broadcasting Corporation (ABC) television news to provide her expertise on astronomy, space and STEM topics.

Harvey-Smith appeared as co-host, alongside Brian Cox and Julia Zemiro, in the three-part ABC Television version of the BBC programme Stargazing Live. In 2016 she was a presenter on the ABC associated program Stargazing Live: Back to Earth. She was a guest scientist on the ABC series Todd Sampson's Life on the Line.

In 2018, Harvey-Smith toured Australia with her live astronomy stage show “When Galaxies Collide”. She hosted the Australian tour of "Eugene Cernan-The Last Man on the Moon" in 2016. In 2015, Harvey-Smith performed several live events on-stage, including her self-penned "Stargayzing" show at Sydney Observatory as part of Sydney Mardi Gras, the opening of "An Evening with Neil DeGrasse Tyson" at Sydney's Hordern Pavilion, and as a guest in Buzz Aldrin: Mission to Mars: a two night event held in Sydney and Melbourne. In 2012, Lisa gave the Perimeter Institute for Theoretical Physics Public Lecture, which is broadcast regularly by TVOntario as part of the Big Ideas TV series. In 2004 she was a member of the Jodrell Bank Observatory team on the BBC television quiz show University Challenge, narrowly defeating the British Library.

=== Radio and print ===
Harvey-Smith has appeared in dozens of radio and podcast programs over the years in Australia and overseas as an expert on astronomy, space and inclusion in the STEM sector. She has also featured in magazines and printed media including Women's Weekly, Women's Health, The Age, The Australian, The Sydney Morning Herald, The Sun-Herald, The Sunday Telegraph, The Australian Financial Review and National Geographic. She has written numerous articles including for The Conversation, the Financial Review and ABC Science.

=== Awards and honours ===
On 28 October 2015, Harvey-Smith received the CSIRO Chairman's Medal for her contributions to the Australian Square Kilometre Array Pathfinder Telescope. On 31 August 2016, Harvey-Smith was awarded the Australian Department of Industry, Innovation and Science Eureka Prize for Promoting Understanding of Australian Science Research, after being a finalist in 2015 Eureka Prize.

In November 2012, The Sydney Morning Herald included Harvey-Smith in its "Top One Hundred: Sydney's Most Influential People".

She was named in The Sydney Morning Herald's "Good Weekend's Who Mattered 2019: Science" list.
