= Falling A Records =

Independent Record Label based in England

Falling A Records is a British Essex, England-based independent record label, founded in the late 1970s by Barry Lamb and Peter Ashby., born out of the D.I.Y cassette movement. It owned a shop in Clacton-on-Sea which sold new and second hand records, distributed fanzines such as New Crimes, Vague, Vox, Flipside, Juniper beri-beri, Blam!, and D.I.Y magazines/comics including the very first copies of Viz. It also distributed leaflets for various causes such as "anti-apartheid" and "anti-vivisection", music and politics being interlinked at the time.

It had a roster of several bands on its own label, such as the insane picnic (sic), Standing Ovation and Spasmodic Caress, as well as cassettes and some vinyl it distributed for other D.I.Y cassette labels including Cause for Concern, Subway, Adventures in Reality, Music for Midgets, Third Mind and Colortapes. Many notable bands were distributed by Falling A, including The Cleaners from Venus featuring Martin Newell, the Modern Art, Attrition, The Pastels, The Membranes and Wavis O'Shave (also known as Foffo Spearjig). Some exclusive material was recorded for Falling A by The Cleaners from Venus and Foffo Spearjig among others.

In 1985, the cassette culture was threatening the fabric of the established music industry, and Falling A's profile was such that it received the largest write up in the annual Music Week directory of UK record labels, even more words than EMI.

The label is still in existence as of July 2021. It is currently reissuing back catalogue on CD while releasing new music and creating a vast archival resource from all the memorabilia, ephemera and past product in its vaults.

== See also ==
- List of record labels
- List of independent UK record labels
- Cassette culture
