= Wavis O'Shave =

- Origin: Britain
- Genres: Comedy rock
- Years active: 1979 to 1987 (sporadic 2004 - 2022)

Wavis O'Shave is a surreal English musician and comedian, who regularly appeared on Channel 4's music show, The Tube (1982–1987).

== Description ==
Wavis O'Shave performed many original comedy characters including the cult figure "The Hard", a bizarre character who made brief appearances on The Tube hitting his hand with a hammer and saying "I felt nowt (nothing)!"

O'Shave appears as Foffo Spearjig The Hard on The Tube Anthology - The Best of Series 1 double disc DVD (2006) and in Once Upon a Time in the North, a 2010 documentary about local music in South Tyneside released on DVD by Northeastern Films. He appears as Wavis O'Shave in the 2011 Northeastern Films DVD We Sold our Soul for Rock 'n' Roll. His video for the remake of his earlier song "Mauve Shoes are Awful" was a nominated at the NME Shockwaves Video awards in 2009.

O'Shave appeared in The Strange world of Wavis O'Shave as part of the hour long BBC Radio 1 documentary Viz - The Rock 'n' Roll Years broadcast in 1997, and in April 2010 had his own one-hour-long special An Evening with Wavis and Foffo on London's Resonance FM.

O'Shave featured heavily in the 1981 book 'Rock Bottom - The Book of Pop Atrocities' by Muck Raker. O'Shave's last TV appearance was on the Granada Television show, Stars In Their Eyes, performing Steve Harley & Cockney Rebel's "Make Me Smile (Come Up and See Me)" in 1994.

In his 2004 autobiography 'Rude Kids - The Unfeasible story of VIZ', author and ex-British comic adult magazine VIZ COMIC Editor Chris Donald describes Wavis as 'He was a sort of cross between Howard Hughes, Tiny Tim and David Icke. He was never seen at the Gosforth Hotel and I'd only ever caught a glimpse of him once in the Anti-Pop office, when he didn't speak at all. To promote the album he only played one gig - at the Music Machine, Camden, in March 1980 - and he didn't even turn up for that. A heavily disguised Arthur 2 Stroke went on in his place. None of his fans knew what Wavis looked like, so there were no complaints'. The gig Donald refers to was reviewed in the British Music Press by RECORD MIRROR on 5/4/1980 without the magazine realising it wasn't actually the real Wavis.

O'Shave has often had strained confrontations with other celebrities. In 1980 he chased British radio DJ and TV comedian Kenny Everett around petrol pumps at a garage in South London and in 2016 presented ex-Sex Pistol John Rotten with a letter claiming that Rotten had 'got his job' and that Wavis would have been a better frontman for the Pistols.

== Recordings ==
He recorded the cult hit album Anna Ford's Bum (1980), named after the ITN newsreader Anna Ford. The album had a Studio side and a Kitchen side that was recorded in Fatty Rounds mothers kitchen (Fatty AKA 'James the Rounder' played keyboards, tuba and Hammond organ). The album caught the attention of the British Press and the front page of the British national Sunday newspaper The Sunday People.

Following Anna Ford's Bum, Wavis recorded a second album entitled Texican Raveloni (Falling A Records) under the name Foffo Spearjig, from which came the single "Tie Your Laces Tight" backed with "You Won't Catch Me on the 503". [The 503 was the bus that went from the Market to the Council Estate of Biddick Hall, where Fatty Round lived; Wavis got ripped off for his change by a psychotic bus driver whilst on the way to Fatty's and committed the act to vinyl].

Another of O'Shave's tracks, "Mauve Shoes are Awful", has been included on the Stateside Hyped2death compilation disc Messthetics no 4. The original of 'Mauve Shoes' had Hats Dad (Hat/Fezz - ginger vocalist and human synth), famously threatening to "Chop the Bloody Electricity Off" to stop the racket being made in Hat's house whilst recording the track. Hats Dad claimed to have got the fabled 'Two Stings' whilst trying to pull the fuse out. Hats Dad, (and his fabled 'Two Stings') made it to vinyl.

In 2004 he recorded a CD single "Katie Derham's Bum" in adoration of ITN newsreader Katie Derham.

Wavis recorded the "Denis Smokes Tabs" / "John is a Fig Roll" six track EP on Company Records (CR003) in 1979, and a collection of his tracks are on the 2005 compilation Potty, Dotty, Ditties of the Deft and Daft (Nursery Rhymes of the Apocalypse) released in 2005 by Dynamite Vision/Falling A Records (FASA3).

In 2012, Wavis recorded "Sunspots on the Moon (It's Snowin' Outside and It's June)", and is collaborating with fellow ex-South Shields resident Barry Lamb and Peter Ashby, who most recently have made a song together as Fictional Rage featuring Wavis O'Shave, called "Ballad of the Pokeawillies".

In May 2011, O'Shave recorded interviews and songs for four shows for the new SKY TV 201 Channel 'Mindscape TV' to be screened early that summer, also available on the Mindscape TV Channel.

O'Shave wrote his autobiography in May 2013, Felt Nowt! - The Wavis O'Shave Story, detailing his many stories involving celebrities including Prince Charles (now King Charles III), Ricky Gervais, and Anni-Frid Lyngstad.

O'Shave gave an exclusive video interview to Newcastle award winning PEEP Magazine in December 2020. In the same month he gave permission for North east comedy club FELT NOWT to use his famous 'Felt Nowt' catchphrase.

In March 2021 Wavis featured in the cult CD album 'Miniatures 2020' with the world's first palindrome song Mr Owl Ate My Metal Worm.

On 1 April 2022 Wavis released his digital single Puppies' Dinner recorded with Two Headed Emperor on the Falling A label.

In April 2022 Wavis starred in a podcast highlighting his career in 'JESTERS: Forgotten Stories of North East Comedy,' a 4 part series, about forgotten comedy heroes of the North East presented by the comedy company Felt Nowt in conjunction with Tyne & Wear Archives and Museums.

In September 2022 Wavis was interviewed by trendy cult online magazine WE ARE CULT about his appearances on The Tube that celebrated its 40th birthday in November.

The same month Wavis also made a second YouTube appearance in interview for Peep Magazine investigating as to whether be might be the first alternative comedian appearing on British TV, a claim that may be justified.

The UK's number one alternative radio station FAB Radio International, based in Manchester, featured Wavis on their 16 December Christmas Classic Rock Hub Show with an exclusive Christmas message for them from his character THE HARD and they also played THE HARD's newly recorded Christmas song (I Wish You a) Hard Christmas.

On Christmas day Wavis and THE HARD were special guests in a 30 minute interview on Lincoln City Radio's 'Sunday Underbelly' show. (I Wish You a) Hard Christmas was played, along with another individual Xmas message from THE HARD.
