= Loxford School =

Location
- Loxford Lane; Ilford, London, IG1 2UT; England; 51°33′00″N 0°05′20″E

Information
- Former names: Loxford Central School, Loxford High School, Loxford School of Science and Technology
- School type: Academy Public
- Motto: "Be at the right place, at the right time, doing the right thing."
- Religious affiliation: Mixed faith
- Established: 1904
- Local authority: Redbridge
- Trust: Loxford School Trust
- Department for Education URN: 140475 Tables
- Ofsted: Reports
- Head teacher: Anita Johnson
- Gender: Mixed
- Age: 3 to 18
- Enrolment: 2,833
- Capacity: 3000
- Sixth form students: Yes
- Houses: None
- Colour: Blue
- Communities served: Redbridge
- Website: www.loxford.net

Loxford School, formerly Loxford School of Science and Technology, is a mixed all-through school with academy status in the Ilford area of the London Borough of Redbridge, England. The secondary school has more than 3000 students aged from 11 to 18 years, and a primary school is connected to it. The school is a part of the Loxford School Trust which consists of 6 other academies.

== Loxford school trust ==
In 2013 the Multi-academy trust "Loxford School Trust Limited" was established with Loxford converting to an academy to become its inaugural school in December. A further 6 schools would go on to join the trust:

- Abbs Cross Academy and Arts College (Joined February 2016)
- Aldborough Primary School (Joined June 2014)
- Tabor Academy (Joined April 2015)
- The Warren School (Joined September 2014)
- Gaynes School (Joined July 2018)
- Cecil Jones Academy (Joined April 2019)

== Criticism ==
In early 2010, a student at the school created a Facebook group which was used to express antisemitic views and behaviour. Its membership grew quickly, gaining over 500 members in two weeks, predominantly amongst teenagers. When the group was brought to the attention of the school they reported it to the police who went on to open an investigation. After reporting on the story broke an early day motion was tabled in parliament describing the language used in the group as, "most foul and abusive", and called for a parliamentary investigation.

In May 2019, after a picture depicting children of the school praying outside circulated online, the school was criticised for not having faith spaces for the children to pray in. The school is in the London Borough of Redbridge, which has a large Muslim community.

== Notable former pupils ==
- Tyesha Mattis, Artistic gymnast
- Nigel Benn, retired professional boxer
