= Warner & Sons =

- Type: Private company
- Traded as: Warner & Sons
- Industry: Textile manufacturing
- Founded: London, England (1870)
- Founder: Benjamin Warner
- Defunct: 1990
- Headquarters: Braintree, England

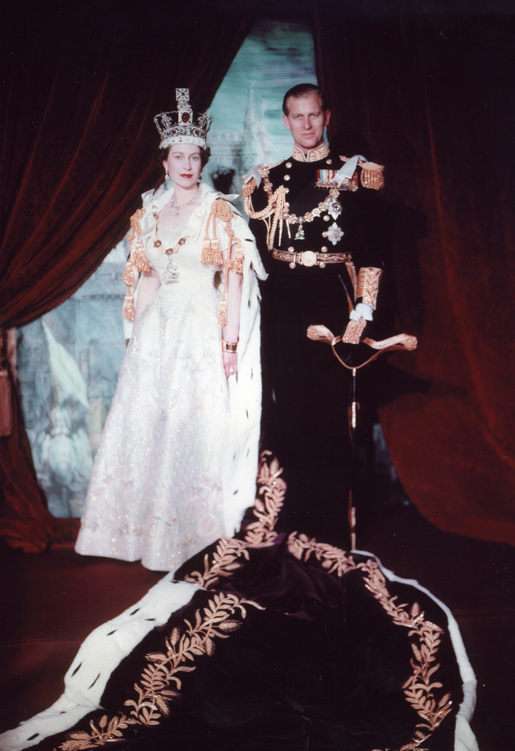
Warner & Sons wove the coronation robes for Elizabeth II (photo:Cecil Beaton)

Warner & Sons (also Warner and Sons) was a British textile manufacturer specialising in silk for the furnishing industry. It wove the coronation robes for both Edward VII and Elizabeth II and had associations with some of the leading textile designers and artists of the 19th and 20th centuries.

== History ==
The firm was established in the historic silk weaving neighbourhood of Spitalfields, London in 1870 and was known under a variety of different names – including Warner, Sillet & Ramm – during its early years. Founder Benjamin Warner, a jacquard weaver, was from a family that had been in the silk industry since at least the 17th century.

Warner wove high quality silks using traditional designs and began supplying royalty around 1880. Some five years earlier, the company had diversified into popular fabrics such as worsted, lampas, brocade and velvet – the move into velvet production was particularly useful for building its reputation. It acquired the company of Charles Norris & Co in 1885, which meant Warner held a royal warrant as supplier of silks and velvets to the royal households; it also supplied stately homes, palaces and embassies internationally. It became known formally as Warner & Sons in 1891, when Benjamin Warner's sons Alfred and Frank joined the business.

Warner & Sons moved to Braintree, Essex in 1895, joining other well known companies located in the town such as Courtaulds, and taking over buildings already used by the silk industry.

== 20th-century developments ==
By the start of the 20th century, Warner & Sons' reputation for silk furnishing fabric was cemented. It expanded in the early decades, moving into powerweaving in 1919 and operating an office in Paris from 1919 to 1926, as well as taking its products into the United States. To meet demand for both modern and traditional designs, it acquired the textile block printing firm of Dartford Print Works in Dartford, Kent in 1926–7.

=== 1930s designs ===
In 1928, Frank Warner's son-in-law Ernest Goodale (later Sir Ernest Goodale) joined the board, becoming managing director in 1930. Two years later, Alec Hunter took charge of the design studio and extended the use of freelance designers as well as combining modern weaves with traditional skills, such as brocading. Fabrics for the Royal Institute of British Architects' headquarters and the University of London Senate House were among the major commissions during this period.

=== Post-war years ===
After the war, Warner & Sons developed a reputation for innovation, thanks in part to the arrival of leading textile designer Marianne Straub in 1950 and her colleague Frank Davies in 1951. Straub was to remain with Warner until her retirement in 1970. One of her most famous early designs for Warner was Surrey, a textile that featured in the Festival of Britain in 1951 and was used in the Regatta Restaurant. Based on the crystalline structure of afwillite, it was chosen as representative of textiles of the early post-war period. During this era, Warner & Sons was still renowned for its high-quality silks and velvets – weaving the coronation robes for Queen Elizabeth II in 1953, as well as the Queensway Coronation Silk that was hung from the balcony of Westminster Abbey during the coronation ceremony. Warner & Sons also created many designs for the Ministry of Works destined for public spaces such as schools and polytechnics.

From 1964, Warner & Sons wove designs created by Straub and Davies for Isabel Tisdall's Tamesa Fabrics. Choosing Warner gave Tamesa the flexibility to create short runs, custom die to design briefs and add special finishes such as protective and fireproof coatings. With a focus on the vibrant commercial market, these designs were championed by influential architects of the time such as Milner Gray and Misha Black and were subsequently to appear on everything from seats on BEA's Trident aircraft to the interiors of the QE2.

Weaving ceased at the company's Braintree location in 1971, but under the stewardship of John Tibbitts (Frank Warner's grandson), Warner & Sons oversaw production of high-end chintz for London companies such as Colefax & Fowler and US firms such as Lee Jofa and Brunschwig and Fils.

== Design legacy ==
Warner & Sons closed at the end of March 1990. In the years leading up to this, Tibbitts had worked to save a vast archive of fabric samples, paper designs and other documentation. Archivists were employed in 1976 and various educational activities provided access to the archive.

After transfers of the Warner & Sons brand and archive holdings to new ownership, and a threat that the collection might be lost, it was saved by £2.7m funding that included support from local and national government, The Art Fund and the Clothworkers' Foundation, enabling it to pass into the ownership of Braintree District Museum Trust. It is now housed in the original mill building in Braintree as the Warner Textile Archive.

Designs in the archive span two centuries and, alongside the work of Marianne Straub, Frank Davies and Alec Hunter, it includes work by artists such as Augustus Pugin, William Morris, Walter Crane, Vanessa Bell, Howard Hodgkin, Edward Bawden, Hans Tisdall, Graham Sutherland and Lynton Lamb.
