= Warner Textile Archive =

Textile archive in Braintree, Essex, England

Coordinates: 51.876°N 0.552°E

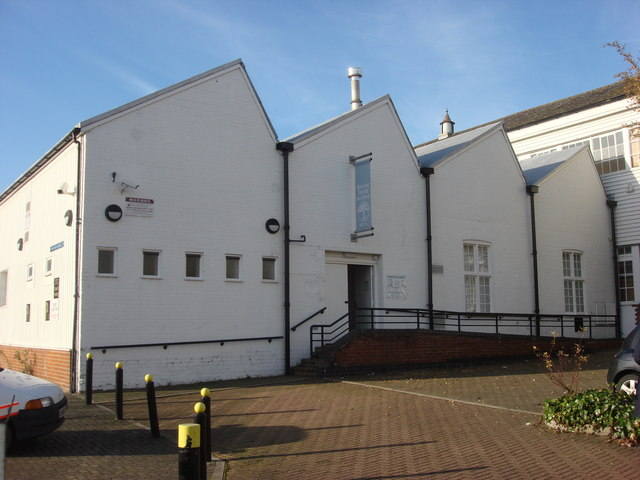
Warner Textile Archive

The Warner Textile Archive is a UK-based collection of textiles, designs and paper records operated by Braintree District Museum Trust. It opened in 1993 and is the second-largest collection of publicly-owned textiles in the UK (after the Victoria & Albert Museum).

Based in Braintree, Essex the Archive consists of some 100,000 items representing the creative and commercial legacy of Warner & Sons, a leading textile manufacturer that operated from Braintree throughout much of the twentieth century.

The Warner Textile Archive is housed in part of the original mill building at Silks Way, Braintree, and maintains a publicly accessible gallery along with rotating public exhibitions.

Warner & Sons was a leading manufacturer of silk and velvet, as well as producing a wide range of other woven fabrics. Notably, it created the Queen's coronation robes and silk hangings used in Westminster Abbey during the coronation ceremony. Representing two centuries of UK textile manufacturing history, the archive features work by artists/designers such as Augustus Pugin, William Morris, Vanessa Bell, Marianne Straub, Hans Tisdall, Lynton Lamb and Graham Sutherland. The Warner archive was conserved for many years by the wallpaper and fabric company Walker Greenbank which sold the collection to Braintree in 2004.
