= Alec Hunter Academy =

Academy in Braintree, England

Coordinates: 51.8728°N 0.5745°E

Location
- Stubbs Lane; Braintree, Essex, CM7 3NR; England

Information
- Type: Academy
- Established: 1959; 67 years ago
- Department for Education URN: 139402 Tables
- Ofsted: Reports
- Chair of Governors: James Waller
- Headteacher: Trevor Lawn
- Gender: Mixed
- Age: 11 to 16
- Enrolment: c. 1,000
- Website: https://www.alechunter.org/

Alec Hunter Academy (formerly The Alec Hunter County Secondary School for Boys and Girls, Alec Hunter Comprehensive School, Alec Hunter High School and Alec Hunter Humanities College) is a secondary school with academy status located in East Braintree, Essex, England.

== History ==
The school opened as a technical school in 1959, and it was named after the weaver and textile designer Alec Hunter (died 1958). It had become a humanities college by 2009, when the school celebrated its 50th anniversary. In that year, local historian David Possee was writing a book on the history of the school when he died; however Braintree Museum hosted an exhibition about the school. In 2013 the school converted to an Academy by joining the Saffron Academy Trust.

== Inspection judgements ==
As of 2021, the school's most recent Ofsted judgement was in 2017, when it was judged Needed improvement overall.

== Notable former pupils ==
- Keith Flint, dancer and vocalist of the big beat band The Prodigy
- Liam Howlett, member of the British band The Prodigy, occasional DJ, and record producer
