= Schuster Laboratory =

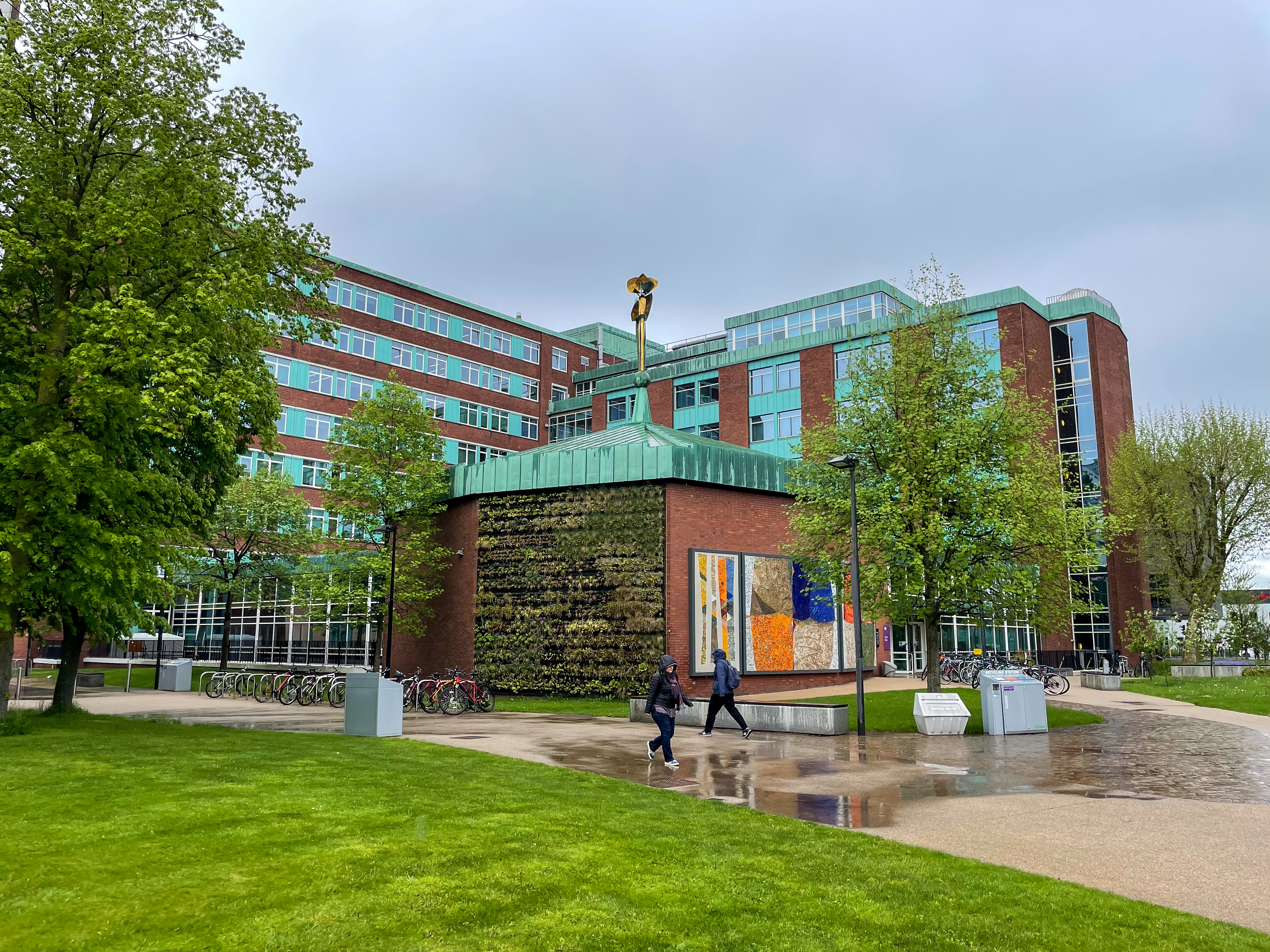
- Interactive map of the Schuster Laboratory area

General information
- Type: Academic teaching and research
- Location: Manchester
- Coordinates: 53°28′1.71″N 2°13′50.62″W
- Completed: 1967
- Owner: The University of Manchester

Technical details
- Floor count: 7

Design and construction
- Architect: Fairhurst, Harry S. & Sons

The Schuster Laboratory (also known as the Schuster Building) houses the Department of Physics and Astronomy, part of the Faculty of Science and Engineering, at the University of Manchester. It is named after Arthur Schuster and is located in Brunswick Park (formerly Brunswick Street) on the main campus of the university.

The building was designed by Fairhurst, Harry S. & Sons, of the Fairhurst Design Group, and was completed in 1967. The roof of the largest lecture theatre in the building has an abstract sculpture by Michael Piper on it. In 2007, the existing labs and offices were refurbished. The Schuster Annexe, opened by Dame Jocelyn Bell Burnell, was added in 2018.

== Architecture ==
The Schuster Laboratory was built during a time of expansion for the university, with the construction of a new Science Quadrangle. The Schuster Building was one of the later buildings constructed on this Quadrangle. The Electrical Engineering Laboratory, on the south side, was completed by 1954. This was followed by the Simon Engineering Laboratories on the south-west of the quadrangle, finished in mid-1962, and the Chemistry building on the south-east which was completed by October 1964. The Schuster Laboratories had been approved, and planning was nearly completed, by the end of August 1962.

The Schuster Annexe was designed by Hawkins Brown and was completed in 2017. It contains additional laboratories and offices, as well as dedicated areas for group work and collaboration.

The mosaic The Alchemist’s Elements (1967, Hans Tisdall) was mounted on the building in 2022.

== Facilities ==
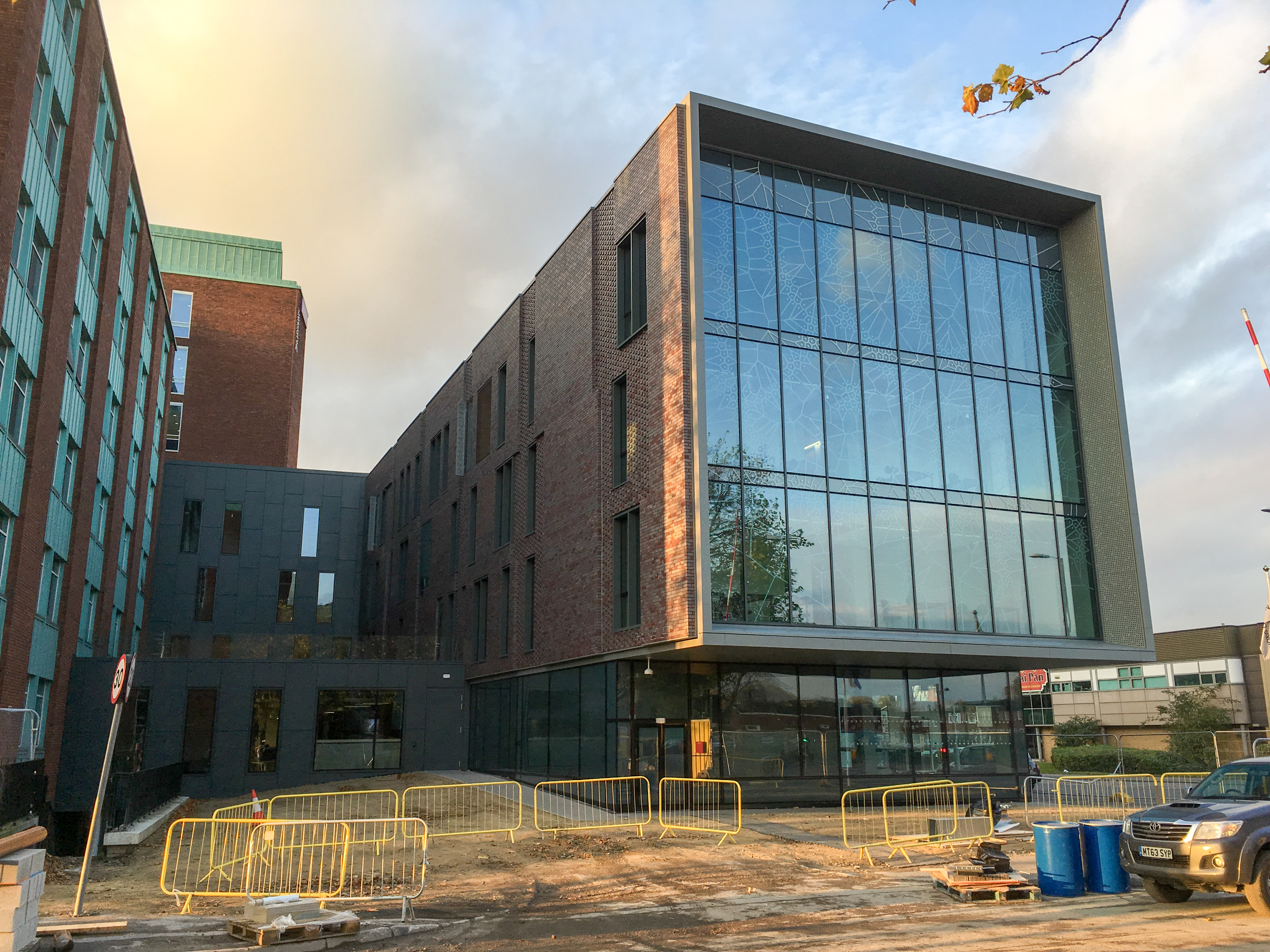
The Schuster annex near completion in 2017

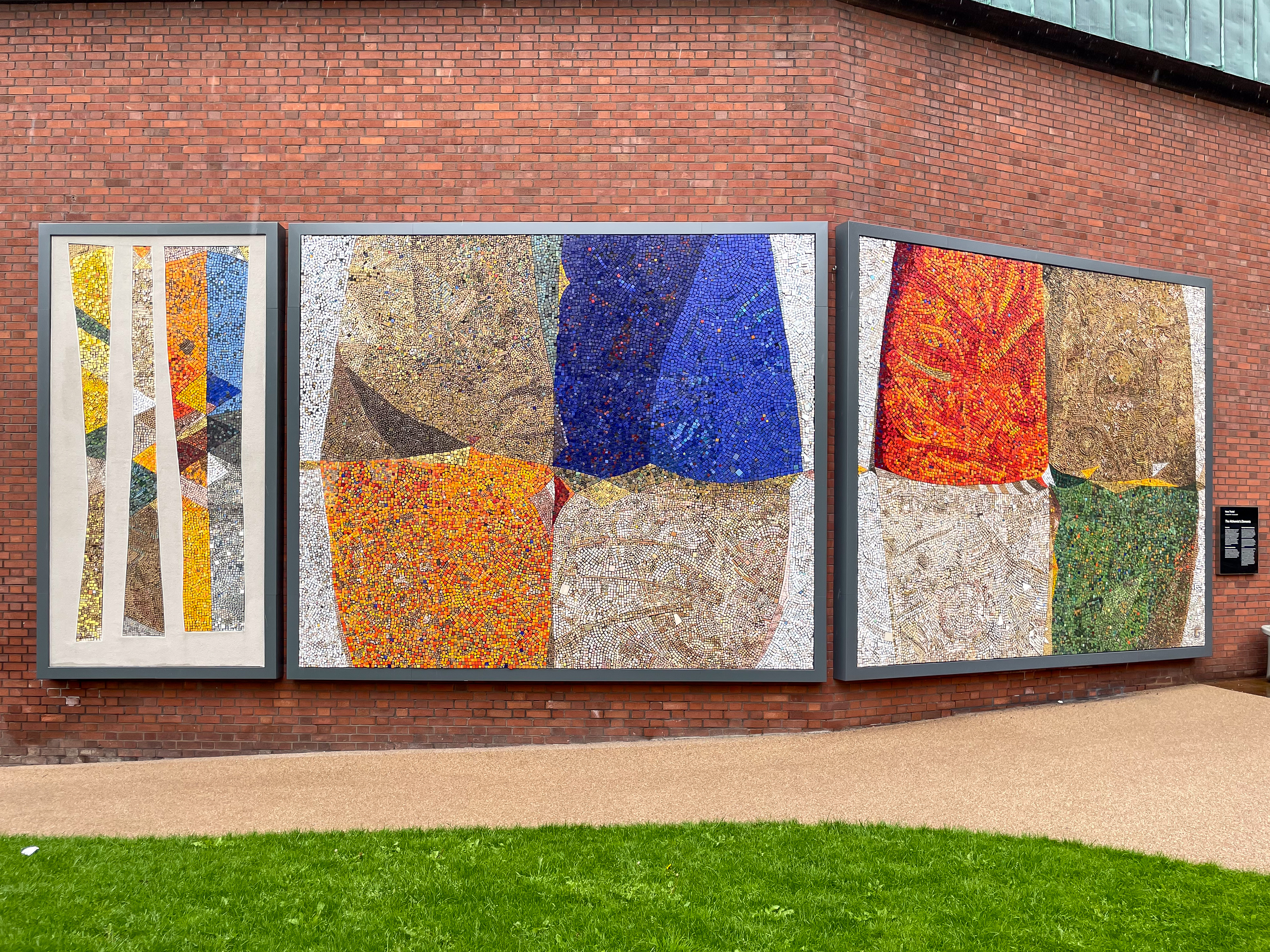
The Alchemist's Elements by Hans Tisdall

The building houses four lecture theatres around the foyer on the ground floor named after people who taught or researched in the department: Rutherford, Bragg, Blackett, and Moseley (seating 258, 148, 145, and 155, respectively). These rooms are centrally allocated by the university, rather than being used solely by the department. There is also a fifth theatre, bearing the name of Jocelyn Bell Burnell, located in the Annexe.

There is a meeting room located on the top floor of the South wing of the building called the Niels Bohr Common Room, which also provides access to the rooftop telescope. The building also houses computer and experimental laboratories for both research and teaching purposes.

The building was purpose-built for the Department of Physics and Astronomy and houses six of its groups specialising in:

- Biological Physics;
- Condensed Matter Physics;
- Non-Linear Dynamics and Liquid Crystal Physics;
- Nuclear Physics;
- Particle Physics; and
- Theoretical Physics.

The Schuster Building was also home to the Photon Physics group and part of the Jodrell Bank Centre for Astrophysics until they were relocated to the Alan Turing Building in September 2007.
