= Braintree, Essex =

Town in Essex, England

Coordinates: 51.878°N 0.550°E

Braintree
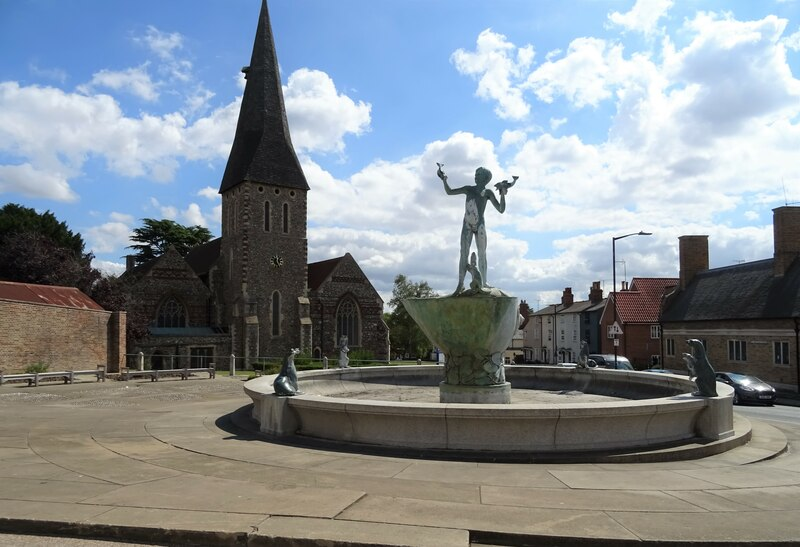
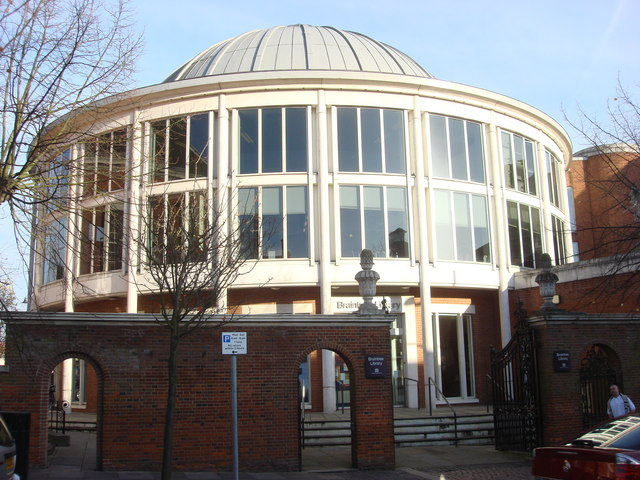
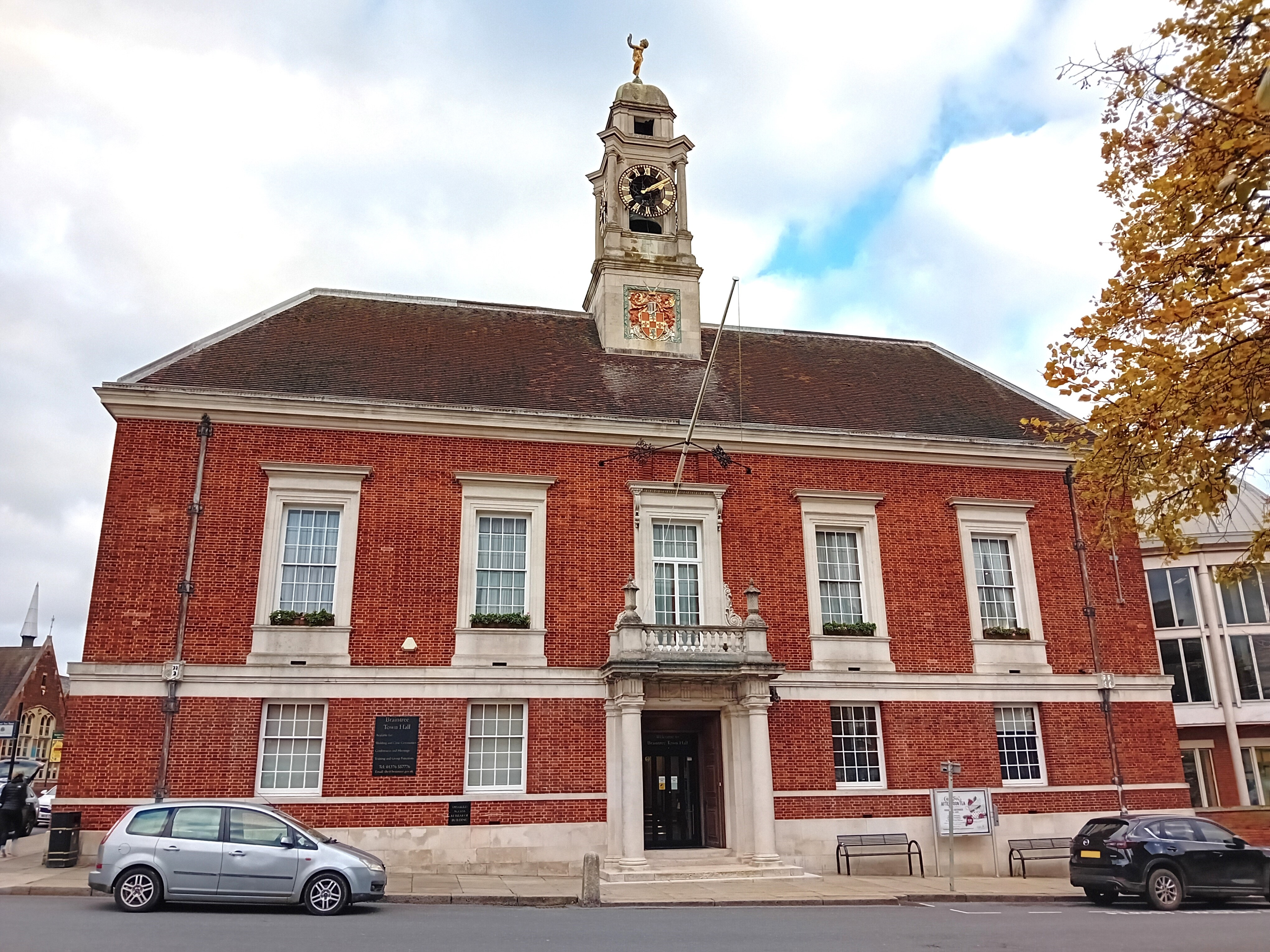
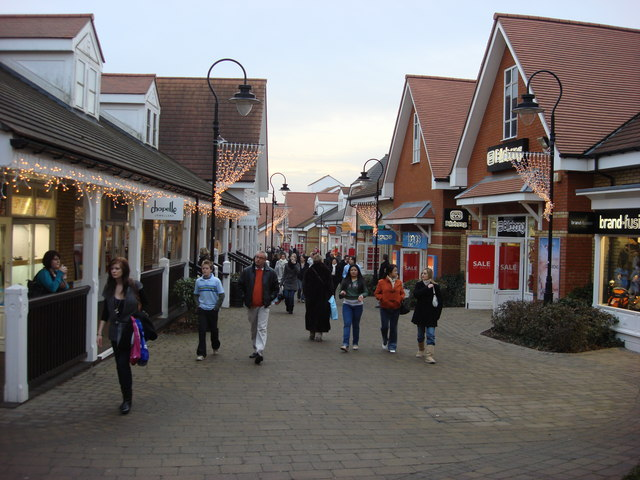
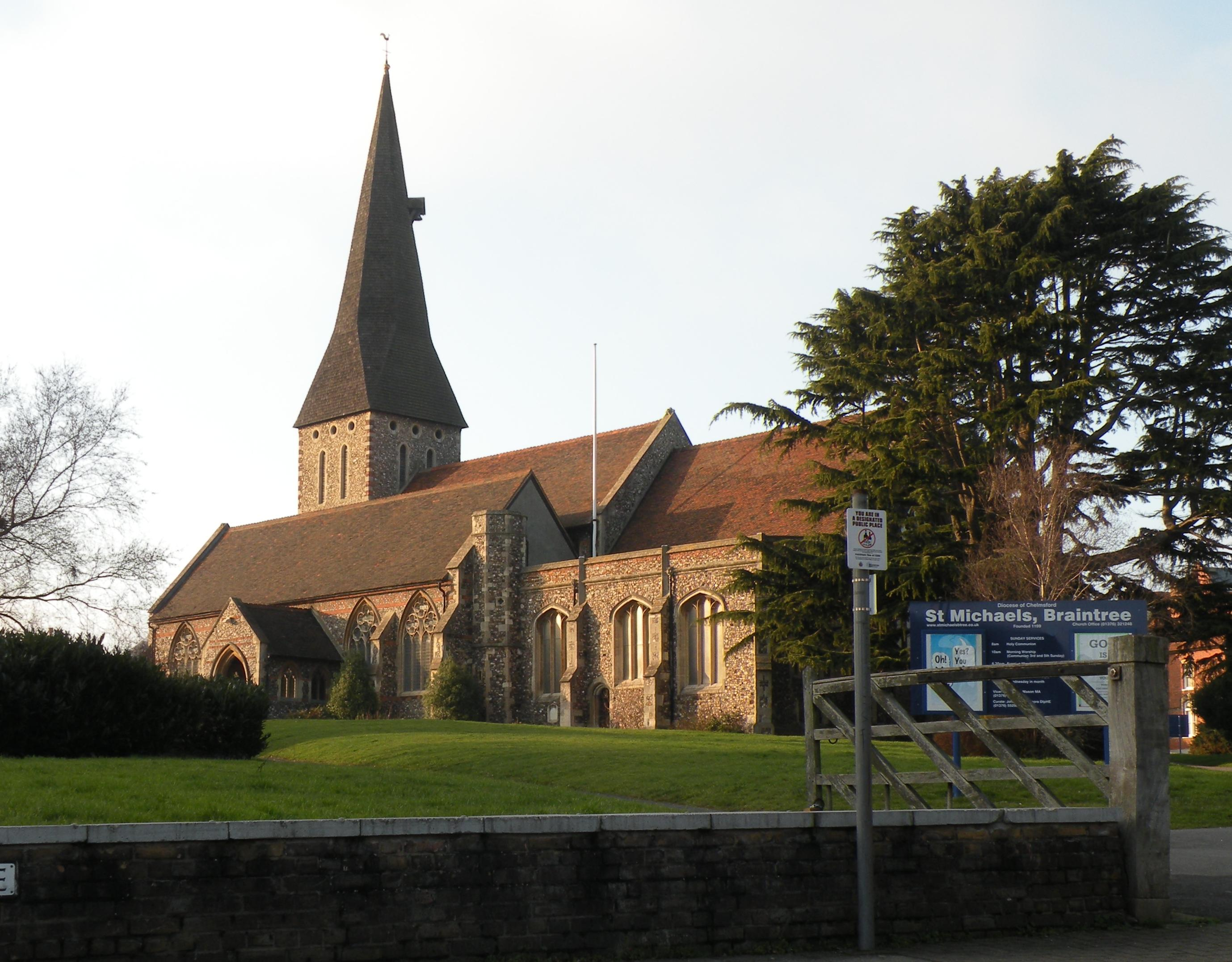
- The Fountain The Library Braintree Town Hall Braintree Village St Michael’s Church

- Location within Essex
- Population: 43,190 (Built up area, 2021)
- OS grid reference: TL7522
- District: Braintree
- Shire county: Essex
- Region: East
- Country: England
- Sovereign state: United Kingdom
- Post town: BRAINTREE
- Postcode district: CM7, CM77
- Dialling code: 01376
- Police: Essex
- Fire: Essex
- Ambulance: East of England
- UK Parliament: Braintree

Braintree is a town in Essex, England. At the 2021 census the built up area as defined by the Office for National Statistics had a population of 43,190. It is the largest settlement in the Braintree District, which also covers an extensive surrounding area.

The town has grown contiguously with several surrounding settlements. The original settlement and parish of Braintree lay on the River Brain and was bounded on the north by Stane Street, the Roman road from Braughing to Colchester. North of that road was the parish of Bocking. The two parishes were united in 1934 as the parish and urban district of Braintree and Bocking, which was subsequently abolished in 1974 when the modern Braintree District was created. Several local organisations still include Braintree and Bocking in their names. (Note: Examples of local organisations which include Braintree and Bocking in their names are: the Braintree & Bocking Constitutional Club, the Rotary Club of Braintree and Bocking, Braintree and Bocking United, Braintree and Bocking Civic Society, and Braintree & Bocking Community Association.)

Braintree is bypassed by the modern-day A120 and A131 roads, while trains serve two stations in the town, at the end of the Braintree Branch Line from Witham.

The town is twinned with Pierrefitte-sur-Seine, France, and gives its name to the towns of Braintree, Massachusetts and Braintree, Vermont, in the United States.

== Toponymy ==
Braintree is referred to as Branchetreu in the Domesday Book of 1086. The name means "Branca's tree" or "Branoc's tree", from an Old English personal name and the word treo(w). The river-name Brain is a back-formation from the place-name.

== History ==
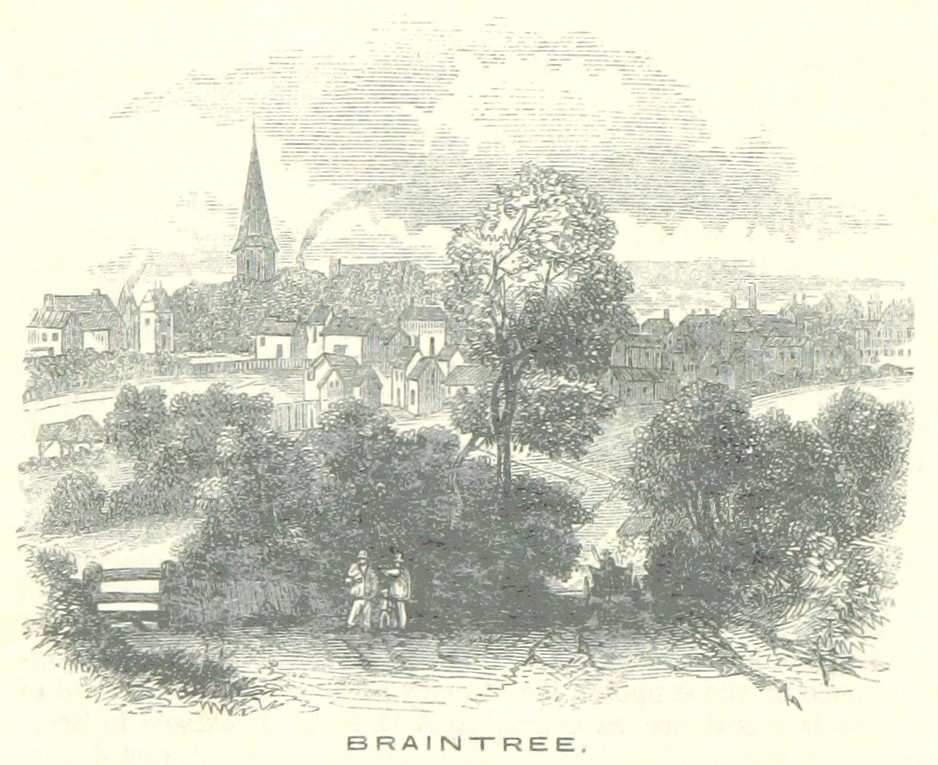
General view of Braintree in 1851.

Braintree dates back over 4,000 years when it was just a small village. People in the area during the Bronze and Iron Ages built houses in the lower part of the town, near the River Brain, known as the Brain Valley. When the Romans invaded, they built two roads and the settlement grew at the junction of these roads. The town was mentioned in the Domesday Book in 1086, where it was noted as a small village consisting of 30 acres. This area was later inhabited by the Saxons, who occupied the town after the Romans left and named the Roman road Stane Street (i.e. Stone Road), a name it still bears. Most notable road names in Braintree now coincide with names of people who fought for the town, and locals living there, such as Aetheric Road (a notable Saxon nobleman who died in the Battle of Maldon in 991, and subsequently left most of the land of Braintree to the Bishop of London, as well as the land of Bocking going to the Prior and monks of Canterbury), Trinovantian Way. (At one point, the townsfolk were called Trinovantes, who were around during the Iron Age, and could till the light sandy soil and hunted animals in the surrounding woodland.) Other road names reflect places that have since been built on, such as Coldnailhurst Avenue (a farm at the top of the current road on Panfield Lane), Becker's Green Road (opposite a field called Becker's Green), Mark's Farm residential estate (based at the site of an old farm where a Tesco store is now situated), and Fairfield Road (directly in the centre of the present town, named after Fair Field at the same site.) The town grew in size and received a market charter in 1190.

=== Roman invasion ===
When the Romans invaded, they built two roads; a settlement developed at the junction of these roads but was later abandoned when the Romans left Britain. The town was recorded in the Domesday Book of 1086, where it was named "Branchetreu", and consisted of 30 acres (12 hectares) in possession of Richard, son of Count Gilbert. Pilgrims used the town as a stopover and the size of the town increased, leading the Bishop of London to obtain a market charter for the town in 1190.

=== Flemish cloth trades ===
As early as the 14th century, Braintree was processing and manufacturing woollen cloth, a trade it was involved with until the late 19th century. The town prospered from the 17th century when Flemish immigrants made the town famous for its wool cloth trade. They took the then current manufacturing methods to a finer detail, and the main markets for the production in the Braintree area were mainly abroad, notably in Spain or Portugal. In 1665, the Great Plague killed 865 out of the population of just 2,300 people.

=== Silk ===
The wool trade died out in the early 19th century and Braintree became a centre for silk manufacturing when George Courtauld opened a silk mill in the town. Others followed, including Warner & Sons. By the late 19th century, Braintree was a thriving agricultural and textile town and benefited from a railway connection to London. The population of the parish in 1841 was 3,670.

The wealthy Courtauld family had a strong influence on the town, supporting plans for many of the town's public buildings such as the town hall and public gardens established in 1888. The town's influence on the textile weaving industry is remembered today in the Warner Textile Archive and at Braintree Museum.

=== Modern history and World War II ===
During the Second World War, production of portable Bailey bridges and other war equipment took place at Crittalls.

== Geography ==
Braintree lies in north Essex, about 46 miles (74 km) from London, with factories and housing to the south and rural areas to the north, where arable crops are grown. It lies about 150 feet (45 m) above sea level. Essex is rather flat on the whole, and the Braintree area is no exception; however, there is a general downward trend in the height of the ground from the northwest towards the coast to the southeast. Two rivers flow through Braintree in this direction. Pod's Brook approaches the western side of the town, forming a natural boundary between Braintree and the neighbouring village of Rayne about two miles (three kilometres) west. Pod's Brook becomes the River Brain as it passes under the Roman road, before running through the southern part of Braintree. The River Pant (or Blackwater) runs roughly parallel to it, through the north of Bocking and away to the east of the town. The Brain eventually flows into the Blackwater several miles away, near Witham.

=== Climate ===
Climate data for Andrewsfield Aerodrome (1991–2020)
Month	Jan	Feb	Mar	Apr	May	Jun	Jul	Aug	Sep	Oct	Nov	Dec	Year
Mean daily maximum °C (°F)	7.1 (44.8)	7.6 (45.7)	10.3 (50.5)	13.6 (56.5)	16.7 (62.1)	19.8 (67.6)	22.5 (72.5)	22.3 (72.1)	19.0 (66.2)	14.6 (58.3)	10.2 (50.4)	7.5 (45.5)	14.3 (57.7)
Mean daily minimum °C (°F)	1.7 (35.1)	1.6 (34.9)	3.0 (37.4)	4.5 (40.1)	7.3 (45.1)	10.0 (50.0)	12.2 (54.0)	12.4 (54.3)	10.4 (50.7)	7.7 (45.9)	4.4 (39.9)	2.0 (35.6)	6.5 (43.7)
Average rainfall mm (inches)	53.5 (2.11)	40.9 (1.61)	37.0 (1.46)	38.6 (1.52)	44.6 (1.76)	51.8 (2.04)	54.1 (2.13)	59.2 (2.33)	48.6 (1.91)	63.0 (2.48)	65.6 (2.58)	57.2 (2.25)	614.0 (24.17)
Average rainy days (≥ 1 mm)	11.6	9.6	8.7	8.5	7.6	8.4	8.2	9.0	8.9	10.6	11.6	11.4	114.0
Source: Met Office

== Governance ==
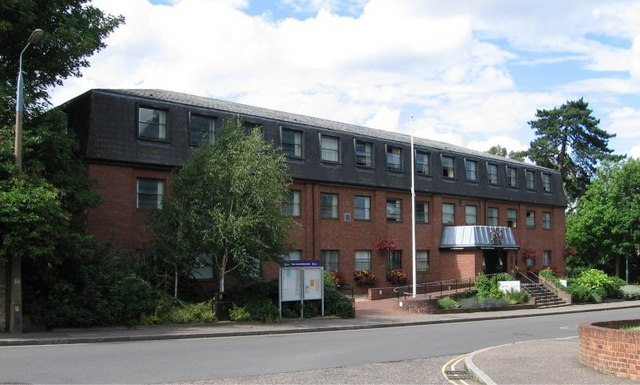
Causeway House, headquarters of Braintree District Council

There are two tiers of local government covering Braintree at the district and county level: Braintree District Council and Essex County Council. Since 1974, the town has not been part of a civil parish. Braintree District Council has its headquarters at Causeway House on Bocking End in the town.

Braintree's first elected council was a Local Board of Health which was established in 1850 and covered the parish of Braintree. Prior to that the area had been governed by its parish vestry. Such local boards were converted into urban district councils in 1894. In 1928 Braintree Urban District Council built Braintree Town Hall in Market Place to serve as its headquarters.

By the early 1930s the urban area of Braintree was growing beyond its historic parish boundaries, particularly into the parish of Bocking to the north. In 1931 the parish of Braintree had a population of 8,912. On 1 April 1934 Braintree Urban District was substantially enlarged to take in Bocking and parts of the neighbouring parishes of Black Notley, Gosfield, Rayne, and Stisted. The enlarged urban district and its associated parish were both renamed Braintree and Bocking at the same time, reflecting the expansion. Braintree and Bocking Urban District was abolished in 1974 under the Local Government Act 1972, merging with four other districts to become Braintree District. No successor parish was created for the former Braintree and Bocking Urban District.

== Culture, media and sport ==
=== Culture ===
Braintree's museum, containing displays relating to the history of the town, is named after the local naturalist John Ray and has a number of relatively famous patrons, including the Essex-born artist Jennifer Walter, who was also the youngest ever female Bard of Bath. The associated Warner Textile Archive contains the second largest collection of publicly owned textiles in the UK, after the Victoria & Albert Museum.

The Braintree Arts Theatre opened in 2009, on the Notley High School campus.

The Bocking Arts Theatre is based at The Literary and Mechanical Institute at the top of Bocking End and promotes pantomimes, drama and a range of live entertainment events. It is also used extensively for local community activities including regular NHS blood donor sessions, record and stamp/coin collectors' fairs, and charity fundraising events. The management of the building is now reliant on unpaid volunteers under the auspices of the Bocking Arts Theatre Charitable Trust. Built in 1863, this Grade II listed building was bequeathed to the citizens of Braintree by George Courtald and his family and celebrated its 150-year anniversary in 2013.

The Braintree and Bocking Carnival takes place each June. The event starts with a procession of floats through the town centre, finishing at Meadowside. Events, including a fair and sideshows, continue throughout the afternoon at Meadowside until around 10 pm.

Braintree Musical Society perform two shows a year, in April and October. For 61 years, these were performed at the Institute at Bocking End but, in 2012, they moved to a new venue at the Braintree Arts Theatre, part of Notley High School.

The English electronic music band The Prodigy originated in Braintree and still live in the area, in nearby Harlow.

=== Media ===
Regional TV news is provided by BBC East and ITV Anglia. Television signals are received from the Sudbury TV transmitter.

Braintree's local newspaper is the Braintree and Witham Times, whose office is based on High Street. The East Anglian Daily Times is a regional daily newspaper.

Local radio stations are BBC Essex on 103.5 FM, Heart East on 96.1 FM, Greatest Hits Radio East (formerly Dream 100 FM) on 100.2 FM and Actual Radio, a DAB station.

=== Sport ===
Braintree Town Football Club is known as The Iron. They have played at the Cressing Road Stadium (off Clockhouse Way) since 1923, when it started as Crittals Sports and Athletic Stadium, with a running track. In the 2010–2011 season, they won promotion to the Conference National division as champions. In the 2015–2016 season, the team reached the first round of the FA Cup when they played Oxford United. In the 2023-24 season, they were promoted back to the National League (the Conference) for a third occasion via the play offs.

Braintree Rugby Union Football Club was formed in 1963 by a group of old boys from Margaret Tabor Secondary School and celebrated its 50th anniversary in May 2013.

Greyhound racing in Braintree was held at three different venues: at Cressing Road from 1967, at Coggeshall Road from 1930 to 1932 and at Notley Road during 1932. The racing at all three tracks was independent (not affiliated to the sports governing body the National Greyhound Racing Club) and known as flapping tracks, which was the nickname given to independent tracks. The Coggeshall Road site, opposite the junction with Marlborough Street, opened on 6 September 1930, while the Notley Road site opposite the Angel public house (on land now covered by Kenworthy Road) raced every Monday and Wednesday at 7pm and Saturday at 3pm. The track was operating on 20 February 1932, with races over 475 yards; the proprietor was T H Mooring.

== Education and schools ==
Braintree has four secondary schools: Gosfield School Independent Co-Educational, Alec Hunter Academy, Notley High School Technology College (which is also the location of the Braintree Sixth Form) and Tabor Academy.

Post 16 education is provided by Gosfield School, Notley High School, The College at Braintree, Braintree Sixth Form and Tabor Academy. Braintree has a special education school called The Edith Borthwick School.

== Economy, industry and commerce ==
Braintree has two main market areas that link throughout the town, which run on Wednesdays and Saturdays. They are based outside the Town Hall in Market Square, and also run along Bank Street and the High Street. The High Street is a pedestrianised area, which allowed only buses until 2020, when it was fully pedestrianised.

Braintree Village, formerly known as Freeport, is a shopping area on the outskirts of the town, described as a "designer outlet village". It has approximately 90 departments where designer brands sell surplus stock for lower than the recommended retail price. It also has its own railway station, namely Braintree Freeport.

There are also several industrial centres located around the main Braintree town area, including the Springwood Industrial Estate, Park Drive Industrial Estate and Broomhills Industrial Estate, off Pod's Brook Lane.

== Transport ==
=== Railway ===
Braintree is served by two railway stations: Braintree and Braintree Freeport. Both are stops on the Braintree branch line, with regular services to Witham operated by Greater Anglia; some services continue on to London Liverpool Street, via Chelmsford and Stratford on Mondays–Saturdays. At Witham, connecting trains run northbound towards Ipswich, Clacton-on-Sea, Walton-on-the-Naze and Colchester.

=== Buses ===
Bus services in Braintree are run by Central Connect, First Essex, Hedingham & Chambers and Stephensons of Essex. Key routes include:

- 38 Witham – Halstead
- 30 Braintree - Braintree
- 70 Braintree – Chelmsford
- 170 Mark’s Farm (Braintree) – Chelmsford
- 370 Halstead - Braintree - Chelmsford
- 570 Great Dunmow - Braintree - Colchester
- 320 Colchester - Great Notley
- 89 Braintree – Halstead – Great Yeldham
- 333 Braintree - Stansted Airport
- X20 Colchester - Stansted Airport.

=== Roads ===
Roads in Braintree are the responsibility of Essex Highways, except the A120 which is part of the government's strategic highways network, overseen by National Highways.

Key roads in the town include:

- The A120 links the town with Bishop's Stortford, Stansted Airport and the M11 for north London and Stratford to the west. Eastbound, the A120 continues to the A12 for Colchester, Ipswich and Harwich International Port.
- The A131 links Braintree to Chelmsford and the A12 for east London. Northbound, the road runs to Halstead, Sudbury and Bury St Edmunds. The A1017 for Haverhill meets the road north of the town.
- The B1018 links the town to Witham, which lies south-east from Braintree.
- The B1053 links nearby Bocking with Finchingfield and Saffron Walden.
- The B1256 (old A120) runs to Bishop's Stortford via Great Dunmow.

=== Cycling ===
National Cycle Route 16, which runs between Bishop's Stortford and Great Totham, passes through Braintree.

The Flitch Way is a shared-use path and bridleway on a former railway line that runs between Braintree and Takeley. The path is a country park for its entire length. It is named after the Dunmow Flitch Trials, a ceremony in which couples can win a side of bacon if they can convince a jury that they have not wished themselves unwed for a year.

== Main sights ==
Bocking Windmill, technically a part of Bocking, the windmill overlooks the countryside at the north end of Braintree & Bocking, having been restored to a degree by the Friends of Bocking Windmill. Although the mill does not work, the majority of the machinery and infrastructure are still in place. The mill is open to visitors on select days throughout the year.

The Braintree District Museum is located opposite the Town Hall, along Manor Street, and was originally the Manor Street School. It was built in 1863, to replace the former British School located in the same place. Nowadays, it houses a selection of items showing the history of Braintree and Bocking.

The Braintree & Bocking Public Gardens are situated on the northern side of Braintree and are close to the District Council offices on Bocking End. They house a garden that was built in 1888 and given to the town of Braintree by Sydney and Sarah Courtauld.

Churches of interest in Braintree include St. Michael's along South Street/High Street, St. Mary's Church along Bocking Church Street, St. Peter's church along St. Peter's Road, just off of Bocking End, and Our Lady Queen of Peace Church.

== Neighbouring villages ==
Villages in the Braintree area include Bocking, Black Notley, White Notley, Great Notley (a recent construction), Stisted, Cressing, Felsted, Rayne and Panfield.

== Notable people ==
- Henry Adams (1583–1646) – ancestor of US Presidents John Adams (also a Founding Father) and John Quincy Adams; emigrated to the Massachusetts Bay Colony from Braintree around 1638.
- Mike Baker (1957–2012) – BBC education correspondent. Grew up in Braintree and wrote a history of the town.
- Beans on Toast (b. 1980) – folk singer. Attended Notley High School and Braintree College.
- James Challis (1803–1882) – astronomer, born in Braintree 12 December 1803.
- The Courtauld family – one of the most prominent families of Braintree and Bocking during the 19th century. Their highly successful silk business made them very rich, and provided much employment in the area. They were very major benefactors to Braintree & Bocking, e.g. Town Hall, Corner House, Leahurst Hostel, William Julien Courtauld Hospital, land and buildings for the High School, Public Gardens, Institute.
- Rupert Everett (b. 1959) – actor born in Norfolk in 1959, spent a short time as a child in Braintree and frequented the former Embassy Cinema (now closed and occupied by Wetherspoons).
- Steve Harley (b. 1951 – 2024) singer/composer and founder of Cockney Rebel, lived in Bradford Street, Braintree, from 1969 to 1971. He worked as a reporter for the Braintree and Witham Times under his real name Stephen Nice. The novelist Jay Merrick, author of Horse Latitudes, worked on the newspaper at the same time under his real name John Thompson.
- Lawrence D. Hills (1911–1990) – founded the Henry Doubleday Research Association headquarters and test site at Bocking, and also developed the Bocking 14 strain of comfrey, which has properties of particular interest to organic gardeners.
- Barry Douglas Lamb (b. 1963) – avant-garde/experimental composer and musician, lived in Braintree from 1989 to 1993 following the demise of The Insane Picnic . Although this appears to have been a period of very little musical output on his part, there is an unofficial recording from the period called "Braintree – the Concubine Harvester".
- Giles Long (b.1976) – triple Paralympic Gold medallist and former World Record holder in the 100m Butterfly, trained with the Braintree and Bocking Swimming Club.
- Olly Murs (b. 1984)– singer and TV personality, was educated at Notley High School.
- Next of Kin – pop group who had two top 40 hits in 1999.
- Louisa Nottidge (1802–1858) – woman wrongfully detained in a lunatic asylum, whose case was fictionalized by Wilkie Collins in The Woman in White, was born at Fulling Mill House, Bradford Street in 1802.
- Andy Overall (b. 1959) – vocalist, songsmith, performer with '80s band Blue Zoo.
- Katherine Parnell (1846–1921) – younger sister of Sir Evelyn Wood (below), and wife of Irish Nationalist leader, Charles Parnell.
- Andrew Phillips, Baron Phillips of Sudbury (b. 1939–2023) – noted politician and lawyer in the field of civil liberties who lived in Bradford Street, Braintree for much of the 1980s.
- The Prodigy – dance music group. The band's leader Liam Howlett was educated at Alec Hunter High School. Howlett caused indignation among some residents when he criticised the town in an interview for the music magazine Q. He reportedly used "an abusive term". He and fellow band member Keith Flint moved out of the town around 1998, to live in seclusion in a small village 5 or 6 miles (8 or 10 kilometres) west.
- John Ray (1627–1705) – naturalist, born in nearby Black Notley.
- Louie Spence (b. 1969) – dance expert, choreographer and television personality.
- Sir Evelyn Wood (1838–1919) – field marshal, Victoria Cross recipient.
