= Sun Dial (band) =

British psychedelic rock band

Sun Dial (occasionally spelled Sundial) is a British psychedelic rock band formed in 1990 by Gary Ramon.

== History ==
The precursor to Sun Dial was Ramon's The Modern Art, formed in the mid-1980s with a loose lineup that never played gigs but did release two studio albums. Ramon disbanded the group out of a desire "to make a more live-sounding group that could go out and play".

The band gained prominence after the release of their first album, Other Way Out, which quickly sold out its initial run through word of mouth alone. The album was strongly praised in the independent music press, winning several awards and accolades. However, the album received little popularity among mainstream critics and radio stations as their authentic 1960s psychedelic sound was out of fashion at the time. Other Way Out remains popular in the psychedelic and progressive rock communities, and has gone through eight reissues since its original release.

Subsequent albums have explored many branches of psychedelia, including space rock, acid rock, stoner rock, neo-psychedelia and psych pop. Their music has been compared to, influenced, or praised by prominent artists such as Monster Magnet, Nirvana, Spiritualized and Spacemen 3. Sun Dial in turn were influenced by the 1960s and 1970s psychedelia and hard rock of Jimi Hendrix, the Beatles, the Stooges, Pink Floyd and Led Zeppelin, as well as the drug-influenced "Madchester" sound of the Stone Roses, Inspiral Carpets and Happy Mondays.

After the 1996 live album Live Drug, Ramon recorded an album called Kohoutek with Russell Barrett (ex-Chapterhouse who would officially join the band in 2003). However, the album has not been released, except for a couple of tracks that came out on the 2009 compilation Processed for DNA. With management deeming the album to be too extreme by the bands management, Ramon took Sun Dial on an extended hiatus and devoted his time to producing records by other bands, including Chemical, and Fantasyy Factoryy. Many of these records were released on Ramon's own Acme label. During this time Ramon also worked with Coil and Current93 and released Quad, a solo project exploring ambient electronica and kraut rock. Sun Dial reconvened for a live performance in December 2002 and released their next album, Zen For Sale, a few months thereafter.

In 2010, they released a 20th anniversary 2-CD anthology, Processed For DNA, via Shrunken Head, their own imprint with Cherry Red, before returning with a new eponymous studio album, musically much heavier than before, and more influenced by early 1990s Seattle than late 1960s psychedelia. It was released alongside a major Sun Dial reissue campaign which stopped after the re-release of the Reflecter album.

== Members ==
As with fellow psych rocker Nick Saloman's The Bevis Frond, Sun Dial has always been an instrument of its frontman Gary Ramon; the band's line up tends to change from album to album. The most stable line ups include the following:

- 1990 (Other Way Out)
  - Gary Ramon (guitar/vocals)
  - Anthony Clough (bass guitar/keyboards)
  - David Morgan (drums/percussion)
- 1991 (Return Journey)
  - Gary Ramon (guitar/vocals)
  - Anthony Clough (keyboards)
  - John Pelech (drums)
- 1991
  - Gary Ramon (guitar/vocals)
  - Anthony Clough (keyboards)
  - John Pelech (drums)
  - Nigel Carpenter (bass guitar)
  - Chris Dalley (guitar/backing vocals)
- 1991–1992 (Reflecter)
  - Gary Ramon (guitar/vocals)
  - John Pelech (drums)
  - Nigel Carpenter (bass guitar)
  - Chris Dalley (guitar/backing vocals)
- 1993 (Libertine)
  - Gary Ramon (guitar/vocals/drums)
  - Nigel Carpenter (bass guitar)
  - Chris Dalley (guitar/backing vocals)
  - Craig Adrienne (drums/backing vocals)
- 1994–1996 (Acid Yantra, Live Drug)
  - Gary Ramon (guitar/vocals)
  - Craig Adrienne (drums/backing vocals)
  - Jake Honeywill (bass guitar)
- 2002 (Zen for Sale)
  - Gary Ramon (guitar/vocals)
  - Joolie Woods (keyboards/violin/flute)
  - Peter Dunton (drums)
  - Lee Moon (bass guitar)
- 2003
  - Gary Ramon (guitar/vocals)
  - Russell Barrett (bass guitar)
  - Angelo Pantaleo (drums)
- 2008–2010
  - Gary Ramon (guitar/vocals/drums)
  - Russell Barrett (bass guitar/percussion)
- 2012
  - Gary Ramon (guitar/vocals/mellotron, Minimoog, ARP, hammond organ)
  - Scorpio (bass guitar/moog taurus 3 bass pedals)
  - Conrad Farmer (drums)
  - Joolie Wood (violin/melodica)
- 2023 (Messages From The Mothership)
  - Gary Ramon (guitars/vocals/hammond organ/vox continental)
  - Scorpio (bass guitars/moog taurus bass/percussion)
  - Cleo Ramon (mellotron/moog filters/jupiter 6).

== Discography ==
Sun Dial are noted for releasing limited-edition albums and singles on independent labels. The discs often become highly sought after by collectors in their vinyl editions.

=== Albums ===
- Other Way Out — Tangerine Records (1990); Dutch East India Trading Company (1991); UFO Records (1991); Acme Records (1994, 1996, 2003); Gallium Arsenide (1996); Lava (1997); Relapse Records (2006)
- Reflecter — UFO Records (1992); Dutch East India Trading Company (1992); Midi Inc. (1992)
- Libertine — Beggars Banquet Records (1994); CD/MC (1994); Atlantic Records (1993)
- Return Journey — Acme Records (1994); Gallium Arsenide (1996); Relapse Records (2006)
- Acid Yantra — Beggars Banquet Records (1995); Acme Records (1995, 2007)
- Live Drug — Acme Records (1996)
- Kahoutek (Unreleased) — Unknown (1998)
- Zen For Sale — Acme Records (2003); Headspin (2003)
- Shards Of God — Acme Records (compilation, 2007)
- Libertine - Deprogrammed — Acme Records (2007)
- Processed For DNA (The 20th Anniversary Anthology) — Shrunken Head (2010)
- Sun Dial — Shrunken Head (2010)
- Return Journey - The Lost Second Album Session 1991 — Shrunken Head (2010)
- Reflector — Shrunken Head (2010)
- Pumpkinhead — Shrunken Head (2011)
- Mind Control — Tangerine Records (2012) (CD by Sulatron Records in 2015)
- Made in the Machine — Sulatron Records (2016)
- Science Fiction — Sulatron Records (2018)
- Return Journey — re-issue on Sulatron Records (2019)
- Messages from the Mothership — Sulatron Records (2023)

=== Singles ===
- Exploding in your Mind — 12", Tangerine Records (1990)
- Visitation — 7", (1991)
- Exploding in your Mind — one-sided 12", UFO Records (1991)
- Fireball — 7", UFO Records (1991)
- Reflecter — CD, UFO Records (1992)
- Fazer — 12", UFO Records (1992)
- Fazer remix — 12", UFO Records (1992)
- Bad Drug — 7", Beggars Banquet Records (1995)
- Apollo — 7", Munster (1995)
- Ghost Machine — 7", Distortions (1997)
- Out of Space Out of Time — 7", Ace of Discs (2002)
- Free Sitar — 7", Acme Records (2002)

=== EPs ===
- Overspill (12"/CD, UFO Records, 1991)
- Fazer (12"/CD, UFO Records, 1992)
- Going Down (7"/CD, Beggars Banquet, 1993)
- Pumpkinhead (CD, Acme, 2008)
- Pumpkinhead 2 (CD, Acme, 2008)
- Pumpkinhead 3 (CD, Acme, 2008)
- Salem (CD, Acme, 2009)
- Afterlife (CD, Acme, 2009)
- Equinox (CD, Acme, 2009)
- Dead at Dawn (CD, Acme, 2010)

=== Box Set ===
- Exploding in your Mind - A 13 Disc Collection of Outtakes, Alternative Mixes and Rehearsals 1990-91 — (Acme 2010)
- Live - A 13 Disc Box Set of Live tracks from 1991-93 — Acme Records (2010)

=== Videos ===
- Fireball (UFO Records, 1991)
- Going Down (Beggars Banquet Records, 1994)
- Bad Drug (Beggars Banquet Records, 1995)
