= Our Lady Queen of Peace Church, Braintree =

Our Lady Queen of Peace
- Our Lady Queen of Peace Church, Braintree
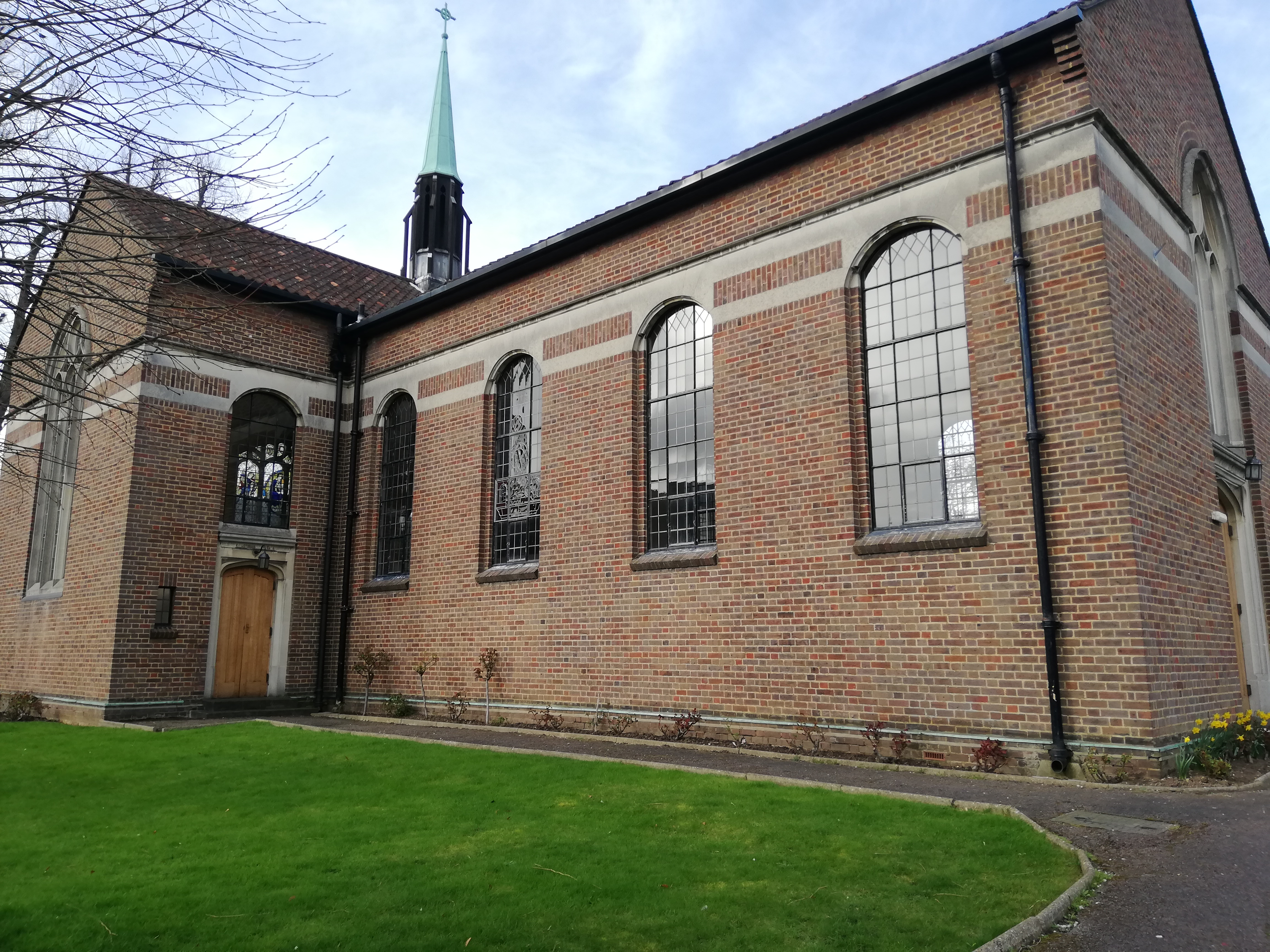
- Image from the front of the church
- Our Lady Queen of Peace
- 51.8787°N 0.5544°E
- Country: England
- Denomination: Roman Catholic
- Tradition: Latin Church

Administration
- Diocese: Roman Catholic Diocese of Brentwood

Clergy
- Bishop: Alan Williams
- Priest: Michael Barwick

Our Lady Queen of Peace Church, Braintree is a Catholic parish church in Braintree, Essex, England.

== History ==
Opened in 1939, Our Lady Queen of Peace is believed to have been the last church to be opened before the outbreak of the Second World War.

The current priest is the David Manson, who has been the priest of the parish since 2016.

In 1953, the parish opened its presbytery; the presbytery is now used as the parish address.

== List of previous priests of the parish ==
In 1939, the Our Lady Queen of Peace Church was opened.

Since the opening, there have been 11 priests in the parish, those being:

- 1937 - 1965: Walter P. Walsh,
- 1965 - 1968: John O'Mahoney,
- 1968 - 1974: Anthony H. Mayston,
- 1974 - 1977: Louis Heston,
- 1977 - 1983: W.Alan Rolph,
- 1983 - 1991: Joseph White,
- 1991 - 1994: Leslie Knight,
- 1994 - 2001: Joseph R. Farrell,
- 2001 - 2009: Anthony McKentey,
- 2009 - 2016: William Nix,
- 2016 - 2025: David Manson.
- 2026 - Present: Michael Barwick
