= Peter Ashby =

English musician and composer

Peter Ashby is an English musician and composer, and a founder member of the bands Frenzid Melon, Spasmodic Caress and the insane picnic, as well as co-founder of Falling A Records with Barry Lamb. He was the original bass player and composer in Spasmodic Caress and featured on the track "Hit the Dead", which appeared on the Presage(s) 12' on 4AD Records in 1980, and also on all tracks of Hillside '79 and Fragments of, both of which were released on Falling A Records. After leaving Spasmodic Caress, he became a multi-instrumentalist and composer in the insane picnic, playing on all of their releases.

During his time with the insane picnic, and since the group disbanded, Ashby has pursued a solo career exploring many musical styles and genres, including avant-garde, experimental, industrial, psychedelic, jazz-rock, electronic, free jazz and progressive rock, the latter two styles being especially notable on his Disturbances in the Ether (Six Armed Man Records SAM8) release, and has collaborated with such artists as Barry Lamb, Jasun Martz (playing drums, bass guitar, lead guitar and piano on his album The Pillory /The Battle), Hilda Garman, Wavis O'Shave and Tor Cesay.

== Recent discography ==
- Bedroom Mirror (Falling A Records EBSCD7) 2006
- Disturbances in the Ether (Six Armed Man Records SAM 8) 2007
- Hagiography (Six Armed Man SAM 11) 2009
