= William Tabor =

English cricketer

Personal information
- Full name: William Clifton Tabor
- Born: 13 December 1842; Bloomsbury, London, England
- Died: 24 May 1867 (aged 24); Brighton, Sussex, England
- Batting: Unknown
- Bowling: Unknown

Domestic team information
- Years: Team
- 1862: Middlesex

William Clifton Tabor (13 December 1842 – 24 May 1867) was an English cricketer.

The son of Charles Tabor, he was born at Bloomsbury in December 1842. He later studied at Brasenose College, Oxford. Tabor made two appearances, the first coming for Middlesex against the Surrey Club at The Oval in 1862, with his second match coming for Southgate against Oxford University in 1863 at Oxford. Tabor died at Brighton in May 1867.
