= Abbs Cross Academy and Arts College =

Abbs Cross Academy and Art's College

Location
- Abbs Cross Lane; Hornchurch, Greater London, RM12 4YB; England; 51.5532°N 0.2083°E

Information
- Type: Academy
- Motto: "Be in the right place, at the right time, doing the right thing"
- Established: 1958
- Department for Education URN: 136663 Tables
- Ofsted: Reports
- Staff: ~200
- Gender: Mixed
- Age: 11 to 16
- Enrolment: ~850
- Houses: A, B, C, M, R, S, (N & E for Year 11)
- Colour: Green/Black/White
- Website: https://www.abbscross.net/

Abbs Cross Academy and Arts College (once known as Abbs Cross Technical High School) is situated on Abbs Cross Lane, Hornchurch, in the London Borough of Havering, England. Abbs Cross Academy and Arts College is an Arts College. The school has a strong link with Havering Sixth Form College in which a majority of its students go on to attend. The School's Headteacher is Mrs Nicola Jethwa, who took on the role of Acting Headteacher but later became the Headteacher. Abbs Cross school was opened in 1958 as a mixed Technical High School, and was enlarged in 1973. Abbs Cross Academy and Arts College joined the "Loxford School Trust" on Tuesday 2 February 2016.

== Arts ==
The school has been awarded an Artsmark from the Arts Council England. Auditions are held for students who wish to enter the school as Performing Arts students.

Abbs Cross Music Department has a Dance Band that played for Queen Elizabeth II at Romford Market, and Tony Blair at the Guildhall in London. It has also taken part in Heritage Concerts at the Queen's Theatre, Hornchurch for the Mayor of Havering and, was a Dome Performer for the Year 2000 celebrations at the Millennium Dome, Greenwich. The Dance Band have also toured throughout Europe. The school held a Jubilee Anniversary party in September 2008 (50th Anniversary). In October 2008, the school's dance company (AX Dance Company) performed at the Olympic festival in Romford, in which the Olympic torch passed through to celebrate the forthcoming 2012 Olympic Games.

== Loxford ==
Loxford School of Science and Technology took control of the leadership Abbs Cross in February 2016. This was due to the struggles the school had faced during the years of 2012 to 2015 after a long-term headteacher retired. An Ofsted inspection in June 2015 downgraded the school from "good" to "inadequate" and the school was put into special measures.

Abbs Cross under the support of the Loxford School Trust decided to put an application in 2016 to open a sixth form. However this application was rejected as the school did not reach the necessary requirements to do so. Many more changes were put in place to try to have the school removed from special measures so the school can have a sixth form in future and regain its status.

The school was removed from special measures in September 2017 and is now rated "good". A second application for a sixth form was also rejected.

== Notable former pupils ==
- Terry Edwards, Musician
- Daniel Huttlestone, Actor
- Rob Lee, England International
- Jesy Nelson, British singer, former member of Little Mix
- Stacey Solomon, Reality TV star and presenter
- Richard Wisker, Actor and Presenter (CBBC)

=== Abbs Cross Technical High School ===
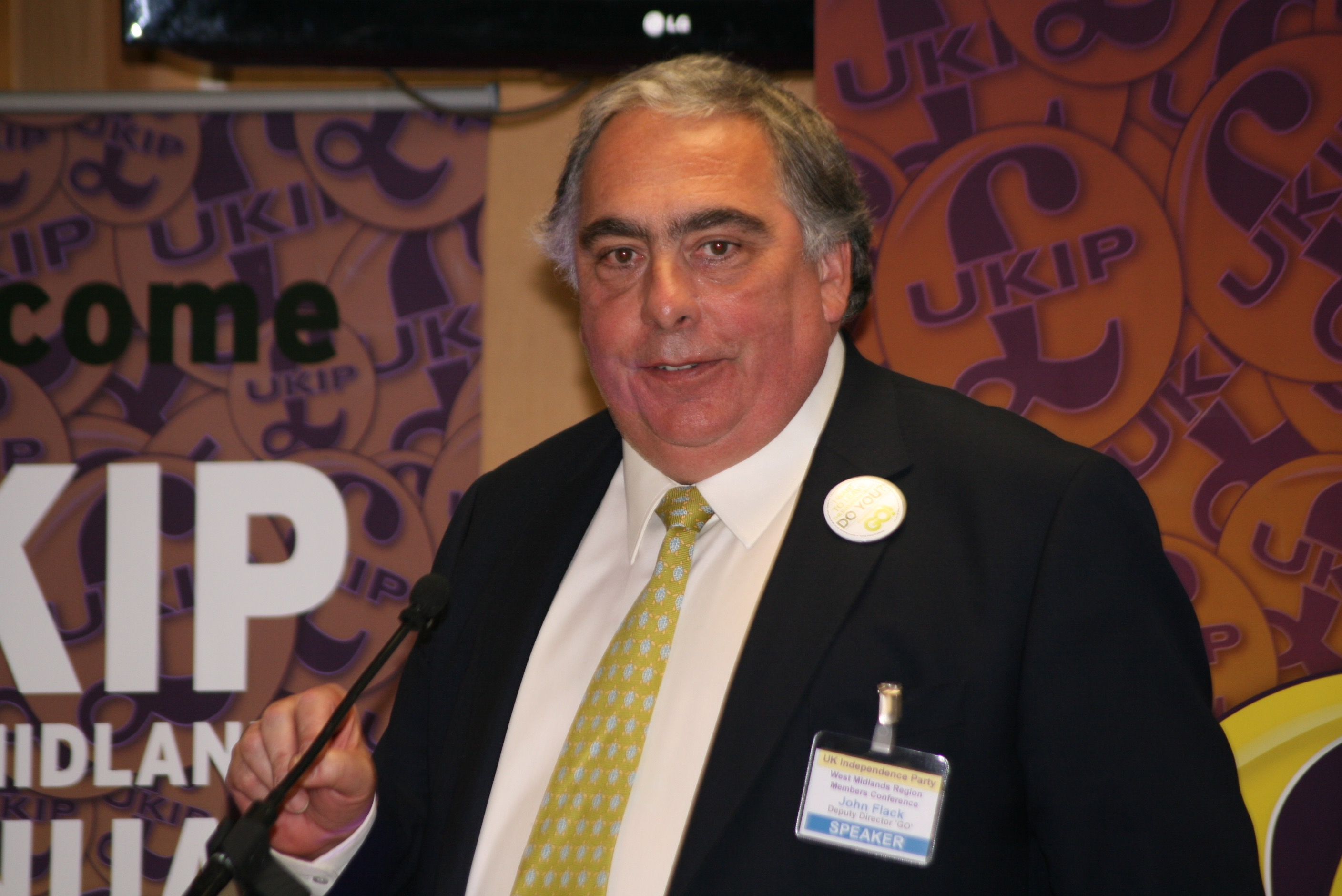
John Flack

- Robert Edmiston, billionaire who founded Christian Vision
- John Fassenfelt OBE, Chairman from 2011 to 2013 of the Magistrates' Association
- John Flack (politician), Conservative MEP from 2017 to 2019 for the East of England
- Alex Jennings, actor who played Prince Charles in the 2006 The Queen
- Bob Neill, Conservative MP from 2006 to 2024 for Bromley and Chislehurst
- David Sullivan (businessman), founder of the Sunday Sport (newspaper)
