= Notley High School =

Notley High School & Sixth Form

Location
- Notley Road; Braintree, Essex, CM7 1WY; England; 51°51′58″N 0°33′00″E

Information
- Type: Academy
- Department for Education URN: 137013 Tables
- Ofsted: Reports
- Local Chair of Governors: Claire Hooks
- Headteacher: Mark Barrow
- Gender: Co-educational
- Age: 11 to 19
- Enrolment: 1444
- Website: notleyhigh.com

Notley High School & Sixth Form is situated in Braintree in Essex, England. The school was built in the early 1970s.

Notley High School was an 11-18 school with combined sixth form until 1992, when the combined sixth form was closed and all sixth form pupils went to the new Braintree Tertiary College. It was then for ages 11–16 school until September 2009, when Notley High School Sixth Form opened for 16- to 19-year-old students. In August 2009, the school became an academy.

Recent Ofsted visits reported the school as Strong and Expected Standard”.

== Houses ==
Notley High School Houses
House	Colour
Cavell	Orange
Franklin	Green
Parks	Blue
Turing	Purple
Winton	Red

== Notable former pupils and staff ==
- Olly Murs, singer-songwriter, musician and television presenter
- Louie Spence, dancer and reality TV star
- Frankie Terry, footballer
- Giles Long, Paralympic Swimmer
- Beans On Toast (musician)
