= Gosfield School =

Independent school in Gosfield, Essex, England

Location
- Gosfield School, Cut Hedge Park, Halsted Road; Gosfield, Halstead, Essex, CO9 1PF; England; 51°56′42″N 0°36′09″E

Information
- Type: Independent
- Motto: Disce aut discede
- Established: 1929
- Local authority: Essex
- Department for Education URN: 115396 Tables
- Age: 2 to 18
- Enrolment: 250
- Houses: 3
- Website: http://www.gosfieldschool.org.uk/

Gosfield School is an English co-educational independent school in Gosfield, in the Braintree district of Essex. It was founded in 1929.

== Setting ==
The school is housed in a mid-nineteenth-century building sited in 110 acres of parkland. The school also features an onsite, fully accredited forest school, and modern sport centre.

== Houses ==
The school has three houses: Neville, Tudor and Woodstock.
