= David Tabor =

David Tabor may refer to:

- David Tabor (physicist) (1913–2005), British physicist
- David Tabor (British Army officer) (1922–2004), British major general
- David H. Tabor, United States Air Force major general
- David M. Tabor (born 1955), American politician from Iowa
