= Braintree College =

Colchester Institute Braintree Campus

Location
- Church Lane; Braintree, Essex, CM7 5SN; England
- 51.8901°N 0.55809°E

Information
- Type: Further education college
- Local authority: Essex
- Department for Education URN: 130673 Tables
- Gender: Coeducational
- Age: 16+
- Website: www.colchester.ac.uk/about-us/campuses/braintree

Colchester Institute Braintree Campus, formerly known as Braintree College, is a further education college based in Braintree, Essex, England. It is a constituent college of Colchester Institute.

The college was originally an independently controlled institution, but merged with Colchester Institute on 29 February 2010. Braintree Campus is Colchester Institute's second-largest facility.

Courses offered focus on skills' priority areas for Essex. These include Technology, Engineering, Construction, Business and Media.

The £5.6m Science, Technology, Engineering and Maths (STEM) Innovation Centre opened in September 2017 and features high-tech workshops, replica industrial facilities and state-of-the-art equipment. The centre provides training opportunities in construction and trades, engineering processes, digital media and manufacturing.

Opened in 2019 the Learning and Technology Centre focuses on high-tech IT and digital media facilities including new workshops, computer suites and virtual reality headsets.

== Notable alumni ==
- Grayson Perry, Turner Prize winning artist
- Jeremy Spake, TV personality
- Lisa Harvey-Smith, Astronomer
- Olly Murs, singer
- Missing Andy, Band
