= Barry Douglas Lamb =

British musician

Barry Lamb (born 9 May 1963 in South Shields, England) is an English experimental musician.

== Biography ==
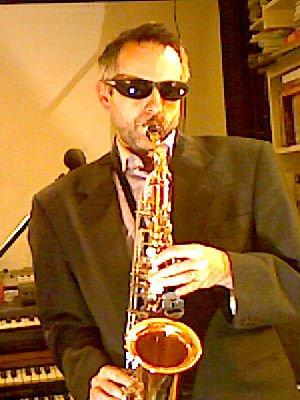
Barry Lamb 2011

Barry Lamb is an English composer, author and musician. He was born in South Shields, but lived in Holland-on-Sea during his secondary school years. He attended Clacton County High School where he first met his long time musical collaborator Peter Ashby. It was during his high school years that he formed Frenzid Melon with Ashby and they began experimenting with music inspired by the immediacy and DIY ethic of punk. Lamb also began making his own experimental music using simple tape manipulation techniques and they began to release their music on cassette. This marked the beginning of what has become known as cassette culture. During this period Ashby & Lamb founded Falling A Records, as one of the early cassette labels and later an independent record label.

Falling A also opened a shop in Clacton-on-Sea and acted as a distribution service for other cassette culture artists, labels and fanzines. Lamb's solo career coexisted with his collaborations with Ashby. Most of his solo albums are avant-garde / electronic / industrial in nature. The album Dusk is perhaps his best-known solo work. During his most prolific period, Lamb had regular correspondence with fellow contemporaries Bryn Jones of Muslimgauze, members of Attrition, and the Third Mind record label.

Sometime during the course of 1981–82 Frenzid Melon disbanded but Ashby and Lamb quickly re emerged having added Owen Turley to the line up and morphing into a new band the insane picnic. Whilst Frenzid Melon had been heavily influenced by punk, the insane picnic had more of a post punk feel to them. Their debut release in the autumn of 1982 was the critically acclaimed "Four Days in April" EP. This received a glowing review by Ian Pye in Melody Maker "A twisted cross between Echo and the Bunnymen & the Fall. The Insane Picnic succeed where most others fail by creating an atmosphere that may not be unique but is at least threateningly distanced from the obvious possibilities.." The insane picnic were unable to capitalise on momentum due to internal struggles and the inability to engage a permanent drummer for regular live performances. A planned album in 1984 did not advance beyond the demo stage. The demo tapes were eventually released on CD in 2004 under the name "this is the winter darkness". The insane picnic continued in a stop start fashion until 1989 with occasional releases and live performances. Their biggest success during this period was the "Magistrates & Saints" 12" EP. The closure of the Falling A shop in 1985 sparked the relocation of the headquarters to Reading.

In 1989 following the demise of the insane picnic, Lamb moved to Braintree, Essex and recorded a progressive rock album with Ashby under the name of Ermin Grud. The resulting album "the narrow path" was released as a private pressing in a deliberately obscure manner with no clues as to the source of the recording or musicians involved. There are fewer than 100 copies in existence. The album is saturated with the sound of the mellotron and Hammond organ in an attempt to pass it off as an authentic early 1970s private pressing.

In the late 1990s his output was minimal, and apart from an appearance on the WMTID album Pale Saint he seemed along with many of his cassette culture contemporaries to have disappeared without a trace. Midway through 2005 though, he re-emerged with an appearance on the Jasun Martz (former member of Frank Zappa's band) album The Pillory / The Battle playing mellotron and wind synth as well as releasing a brand new album entitled It's All About Purpose on the Six Armed Man label. 2006 saw another flurry of activity with several contributions to various Six Armed Man releases and another album of new material entitled Observations of Istanbul.

In 2007 he released an album of new material called ...this is which has received critical acclaim in the underground music network. Lamb's continued partnership with former insane picnic and Frenzid Melon member Peter Ashby continues to bear fruit as they work together. Other collaborations include Lamb playing saxophone on Peter Ashby's Disturbances in the ether album, working with up and coming urban hip hop artist Tor Cesay, collaborating with Keith Levene, being covered by Swiss chanteuse Hilda Garman and recording with Wavis O'Shave.

Following another hiatus in 2016, the Ashby & Lamb partnership reconvened under the name of The Two Headed Emperor. This resulted in another flurry of new releases and activity.

In 2020, he headed up a team that curated and delivered the 40th anniversary release of Morgan Fisher's influential Miniatures series. The subsequent album contained tracks from many well known artists including some from the original 1980 album and its millennial sequel as well as a selection of lesser known musicians. Wire Magazine reviewed it as "musically tight and conceptually svelte, like a sonic haiku. Limiting tracks to one minute leads to an economy and urgency that is completely engaging".
