= The Insane Picnic =

In the early 1980s, English band The Insane Picnic (styled as the insane picnic) were one of the pioneering D.I.Y. cassette bands, composed of members Peter Ashby, Barry Douglas Lamb and Owen Turley. They recorded several releases for the English independent record label Falling A Records. As well as regularly appearing in many fanzines, they were also often featured in the mainstream music papers with favourable reviews in Melody Maker, Sounds and NME, also featuring on several occasions in the Sounds Obscurist chart and Psychedelic chart and were favourites of pirate radio stations Liverpool City Radio and Andromeda.

== Discography ==
- Four Days in April — 1981, cassette-only EP (Falling A, catalogue number EBS3)
- Four Days in April — 2004, CD reissue (Falling A, catalogue number EBSCD1)
- "Romance" / "Politician's Promise" — 1983, cassette-only single (Falling A, catalogue number EBS5)
- Magistrates and Saints — 1986, 12" vinyl EP (Falling A/Waterfall, catalogue number waterfall 2)
- This is the Winter Darkness — 2004, CD album (Falling A, catalogue number FASA1; recorded in 1985 and originally intended for vinyl release, it remained unreleased until the 2004 CD issue)

== See also ==
- Cassette culture
