= Reynolds (surname) =

Origin
- Meaning: "son of Reynold"
- Region of origin: Liatroim, England, Ireland

Reynolds is a surname in the English language. Among the earliest recorded use of the surname is from the early 11th century.

== English Reynolds ==
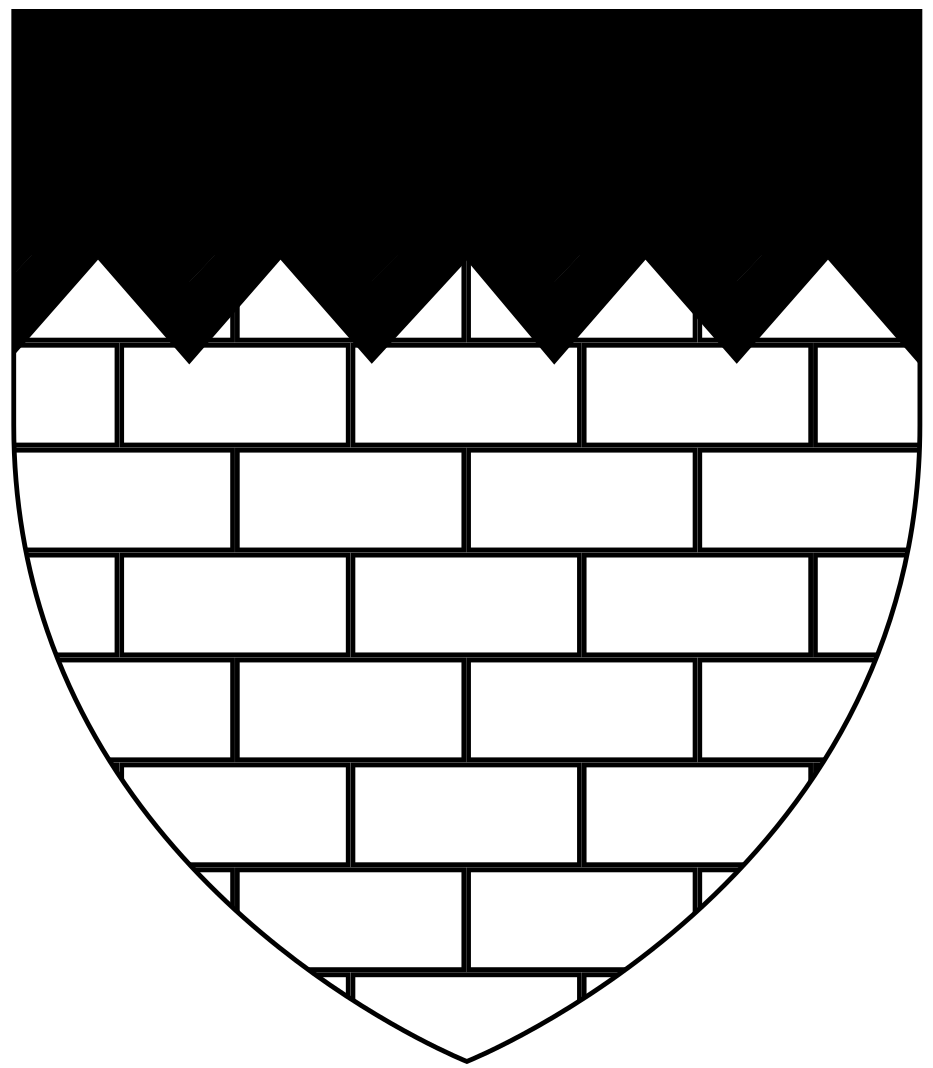
Arms of Reynell, adopted at the start of the age of heraldry (c. 1200 – 1215): Argent, masonry sable a chief indented of the second

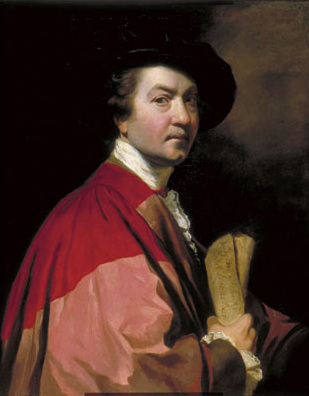
Joshua Reynolds – self-portrait

Reynolds is a patronymic surname meaning "son of Reynold", where the given name of the father, "Reynold", or "Reginald", was a Germanic name composed of *raginą + *waldą, meaning "Powerful Ruler" The addition of "s" to the father's first name makes Reynolds a simple genitive case patronymic.

Possessors of these names arrived in England with the Norman Conquest of 1066, and early English chronicles indicate a Norman origin, with the name appearing in England from about 1066. Early records of the name mention Willemus filius Raunaldi who was listed in the Domesday Book of 1086, in which "Rainald-us" is a common Christian name. The alternative Saxon origin is less commonly cited (in this etymology, the name is constructed from the Saxon words Rhein, pure, and hold, love).

The name Reynolds appeared in many references, but spellings included Reynell, Reynalds, Renals, Rennels and many more. Scribes recorded and spelled the name as it sounded. Hence, a person would appear to be born with one spelling, married with another, and buried with still another.

Reynolds emerged as a notable family name in the county of Somerset where Sir Richard Reynell (died before 1213) was seated at Pitney in Somerset and was given custody of the Castles at Exeter and Launceston by King Richard I when he went to the Holy Land in 1191. In 1198 Godfrey, Robert and Torketil Renoldus were registered in Normandy.

Meanwhile, many of the junior branches had joined the Earl of Pembroke's Irish invasion, where they became the Earls of Cavan, of Lisburne, of Mountmorris. In England the main line was forfeited but Sir Richard's son recovered the lands. This distinguished west country family also branched to other locations in England, mostly under the name Reynolds; for example, Walter Reynolds (died 1327) was the son of a Windsor baker, who became the favourite of King Edward II and Archbishop of Canterbury (1313–1327).

During the 12th century many of these Norman families moved north to Scotland in the train of the Earl of Huntingdon, later to become King David of Scotland.

In Ireland, settlers became known as the "Adventurers for land." They "undertook" to keep the Protestant faith, and were granted lands previously held by the Irish. This family migrated to Ireland during two periods, first with the Anglo-Norman invasion of Ireland, and later, in the 17th century giving rise to the Reynells of Reynell castle. In some cases it is difficult to distinguish early migrants from native Irish Reynolds who derive their name from McRannell, formerly spelled "Mac Ragnaill".

Among colonisers of North America bearing the family name Reynolds were Henry, Samuel, Thomas Reynold who joined the colonisation of the Barbados in 1688; Christopher Reynolds settled in Virginia in 1622; Nathaniel Reynold settled in Salem in 1630; Robert Reynolds settled in Salem in 1630 with Mary and his four children; Cornelius, Edward, George, Hannah, James, Mary, Nicholas, Richard Reynolds also settled in Virginia. During the American War of Independence some declared their loyalty to the Crown and moved into Canada as United Empire Loyalists.

More recently, notable bearers of the Reynolds surname include: Sir Joshua Reynolds (1723–1792), painter; John Reynolds (US politician) (1788–1865), American politician, Governor of Illinois; James Clark McReynolds (1862–1946), US Attorney General (1913–14) and Associate Justice of the US Supreme Court (1914–41); Albert Reynolds (1932–2014), Irish politician, Prime Minister of the Republic of Ireland (1992–95); Debbie Reynolds (1932–2016), American actress, dancer and singer; Christopher Reynolds, Australian Archbishop of Adelaide (1873–1893); as well as Burt Reynolds (1936–2018), American actor.

=== Mottos ===
The ancient family Motto for this distinguished name was: Jus meum tuebor ("I will defend my right")

Or, "Favente Deo ("With God favouring").

== Irish Reynolds ==
In Ireland, the Reynolds surname originates from Muintir Eolais, the primary Conmaicne sept of south County Leitrim.

Throughout Ireland's rich history, the Reynolds family name was a prominent one, and even today County Leitrim is the principal stronghold of the name, nearly half the people in Ireland so called hailing from that area.

In the Irish language, the surname is rendered Mac Raghnaill, and the name is ultimately derived from the Old Norse Rognvald a Latin borrowing of the two words regal and valor. It was also a surname of Irish Huguenots who came to Ireland from France to evade religious persecution in the 1600s; The original French surnames being either Renaud or Renault; Or a combination of both, respectively.

Like many Irish families, the Reynolds began emigrating from Ireland in two fronts: early in America's history, as they settled in the northeast prior to the American Revolution; and later, in the 19th century, during the Great Irish Hunger, when millions of poor Irish came to North America. The first wave of Irish immigrants were mostly Anglo-Irish Protestant converts from the north of Ireland, which differentiates them distinctly from the second wave of refugees from the Great Famine of Ireland, who were largely Roman Catholic and from Mainland Ireland.

Some of the better-known Irish Reynolds include:

- Alan Reynolds (footballer) (born 1974), retired Irish footballer and assistant with Derry City F.C.
- Albert Reynolds (1932–2014), eighth Taoiseach of Ireland and fifth leader of Fianna Fáil
- Charles Reynolds (cleric), (born 1496/1497), Irish cleric, Archdeacon, Chaplin, and "traitor" who opposed Henry VIII of England.
- Gerry Reynolds (Irish politician) (born 1961)
- James Henry Reynolds (1844–1932), famous soldier and recipient of the Victoria Cross
- Mark Reynolds (basketball) (born 1984), Irish basketball player
- Osborne Reynolds (1842–1912), Irish physicist and engineer
- Patrick Reynolds (Cumann na nGaedhael) (1887–1932), father of Patrick J. Reynolds and an Irish Cumann na nGaedhael politician
- Patrick J. Reynolds (politician) (1920–2003), Irish politician who served three terms in Dáil Éireann and five in Seanad Éireann, where he was Cathaoirleach (speaker) for four years.

== Welsh Reynolds ==
- Nicola Reynolds (born 1972), Welsh actress

== Portuguese Reynolds ==
Originally from Maidstone, Kent, England, the first Reynolds that related to Portugal, Thomas Johnson William Reynolds, born in 1786, was a naval officer but withdrawn, settled later in Chatham, also in Kent, as an importer of fruit, wine corks and virgin cork from Spain and Portugal, until, because of a liver disease, on the advice of a doctor, that Reynolds began a sea voyage that brought him to Porto, where he saw a good opportunity to expand his business. With him came his sons, Thomas, William and Robert Hunter Reynolds, born respectively in 1811 and 1820. His daughter had already been born in Port Elizabeth in 1828.

Portugal proved to be a wealth of opportunities for these Reynolds. His son Robert, was the person that brought him to the Alentejo region, where he began his purchase of cork bark still on the tree, paying in advance, sometimes several years, with risk but with superb profits. Thus came the Alentejo and setting properties in Estremoz, accompanied by a nephew, son of Thomas, born in 1842, named William Reynolds.

== People ==
People whose family name is or was Reynolds or one of its variants include:

- Adam Reynolds (born 1990), Australian rugby league footballer
- Alastair Reynolds (born 1966), Welsh science fiction author
- Alexander Reynolds (1816–1876), American Army officer & Confederate general
- Allie Reynolds (1917–1994), American Major League Baseball pitcher
- Alvina Reynolds, Saint Lucian politician
- Andrew Reynolds (disambiguation)
- Anne Reynolds (died 1634), English courtier
- Barbara Reynolds (1914–2015), English scholar of Italian studies, lexicographer and translator
- Bill Rennells (born 1931), British broadcaster and journalist
- Bob Reynolds (disambiguation)
- Brayley Reynolds (born 1935), Welsh footballer
- Brian Reynolds (disambiguation)
- Bruce Reynolds (1931–2013), English criminal who masterminded the 1963 Great Train Robbery
- Bryan Reynolds (scholar) (born 1965), American performance theorist
- Bryan Reynolds (baseball) (born 1995), American professional baseball outfielder
- Bryan Reynolds (soccer) (born 2001), American professional soccer player
- Burt Reynolds (1936–2018), American actor
- Butch Reynolds (born 1964), American track star
- Carl Reynolds (1903–1978), American Major League Baseball outfielder
- Charles Reynolds (disambiguation)
- Christopher Reynolds (disambiguation)
- Colin Reynolds, Canadian politician from Manitoba
- Corey Reynolds (born 1974), American actor
- Craig Reynolds (disambiguation)
- Dallas Reynolds (born 1984), American football player
- Dan Reynolds (born 1987), American musician, frontman of the pop rock band Imagine Dragons
- Daphne Reynolds (1918–2002), English painter and printmaker
- Darius Reynolds (born 1989), American football player
- David Reynolds (disambiguation)
- Dean Reynolds (born 1963), English professional snooker player
- Debbie Reynolds (1932–2016), American actress
- Debby Reynolds (born 1952), former UK Chief Veterinary Officer
- Deborah Reynolds (born 1953), American politician from New Hampshire
- Dick Reynolds (politician) (1927–2014), American politician from Texas
- DJ eL Reynolds (born Lee Martin Reynolds), English DJ/radio personality, also of Filipino descent
- Don Reynolds (actor) (1937–2019), American actor
- Donn Reynolds (1921–1997), Canadian country singer and world record yodeller
- Douglas Reynolds (1882–1916), English recipient of the Victoria Cross
- Ed Reynolds (safety) (born 1991), American football player
- Ed Reynolds (scholar), professor
- Elise Reynolds (born 1969), Dutch cricketer
- Ernest Septimus Reynolds (1861–1926), English Physician
- Florence Reynolds (1898–1985), American politician from Nebraska
- Frank Reynolds (1923–1983), journalist for the American Broadcasting Company (ABC)
- Frederick Reynolds (shooting victim) (died 2001), Belizean teenager
- Gene Reynolds (1923–2020), American actor, television writer, director, and producer
- George Reynolds (disambiguation)
- Gerald Reynolds (disambiguation)
- Gerry Reynolds (disambiguation)
- Gladys H. Reynolds, American statistician
- Hannah Reynolds (soccer) (born 1998), American soccer player
- Harold Reynolds (born 1960), Major League Baseball second baseman
- Harvey Reynolds (born 2004), English rugby league footballer
- Henry Reynolds (disambiguation)
- Hiram Reynolds (1854–1938), General Superintendent, Church of the Nazarene
- Hubert Reynolds (1860–1938), American politician from Colorado
- Hunter Reynolds (1959–2022), American visual artist and AIDS activist
- J. Sargeant Reynolds, American politician from Virginia
- James Reynolds (disambiguation)
- Jack Reynolds (disambiguation)
- Jalen Reynolds (born 1992), American basketball player for Maccabi Tel Aviv of the Israeli Basketball Premier League and Euroleague.
- Jason Reynolds (born 1983), American writer
- Jasper Reynolds, English footballer
- Jeremiah N. Reynolds (1799–1858), newspaper editor, lecturer, explorer and author
- Jerry Reynolds (disambiguation)
- Jock Reynolds (born 1947), American museum administrator and visual artist
- Blind Joe Reynolds (1900 or 1904–1968), American singer-songwriter and blues guitarist
- Joffrey Reynolds (born 1979), gridiron football player
- John Reynolds (disambiguation)
- John F. Reynolds, Union general in the American Civil War
- Jonathan Reynolds, British politician
- Jonathan Reynolds (writer), American writer
- Joseph Reynolds (disambiguation)
- Josh Reynolds (born 1989), Australian rugby league footballer
- Josh Reynolds (American football) (born 1995), American football player
- Joshua Reynolds (1723–1792), English painter
- Joyce Reynolds (actress) (1924–2019), American film actress
- Joyce K. Reynolds, American computer scientist
- Julia Reynolds, American journalist
- Kev Reynolds (1943–2021), English outdoor writer
- Kevin Reynolds (disambiguation), multiple people
- Kim Reynolds (born 1959), 43rd Governor of Iowa
- Lacey Reynolds, American college basketball coach
- Lee Reynolds, American theater producer
- Lisa Reynolds, American politician from Oregon
- Luke Reynolds, English singer/songwriter
- Mack Reynolds (1917–1983), US pulp science fiction magazine author
- Malvina Reynolds (1900–1978), American folk/blues singer-songwriter and political activist
- Maria Hester Park (née Reynolds) (1760–1813), English keyboard player, composer and teacher
- Mark Reynolds (disambiguation)
- Matt Reynolds (infielder) (born 1990), American baseball player
- Mel Reynolds (born 1952), American politician from Illinois
- Michele Reynolds, American politician from Ohio
- Nick Reynolds (1933–2008), American folk musician, founding member of The Kingston Trio
- Nick Reynolds (sculptor), British sculptor
- Norman Reynolds (1934–2023), British Academy Award-winning art director
- Osborne Reynolds (1842–1912), Irish physicist and engineer
- Pam Reynolds, American musician who had a famous near-death experience
- Patrick Reynolds (disambiguation)
- Paul Reynolds (disambiguation)
- Peter Reynolds (disambiguation)
- Phil Reynolds, British disc jockey
- Prue-Anne Reynalds, Australian cyclist
- R. J. Reynolds (1850–1918), founder of R. J. Reynolds Tobacco Company
- Ray Reynolds (born 1936), Australian cricketer
- Richard Reynolds (disambiguation)
- Robert Reynolds (disambiguation)
- Roger Reynolds (born 1934), US composer
- Rose Reynolds, British actress
- Roughton "Rou" Reynolds, lead singer/electronics in Enter Shikari; an English post-hardcore band
- Ryan Reynolds (born 1976), Canadian actor
- Sadiqa Reynolds (born 1972), American attorney and social justice advocate
- Samuel Reynolds (disambiguation)
- Scottie Reynolds (born 1987), American basketball player
- Shane Reynolds (born 1968), Major League Baseball pitcher
- Sherman Reynolds (1878–1958), rancher and mayor of Chico, California from 1919 to 1923
- Sidney Hugh Reynolds (1867–1949), English geologist
- Simon Reynolds, British music critic
- Stan Reynolds, Canadian businessman
- Stan Reynolds, English jazz trumpeter
- Tabor B. Reynolds (1821–1901), American physician and politician from New York
- Tait Reynolds (born 2007), American football player
- Thomas Reynolds (disambiguation)
- Tim Reynolds (born 1957, American guitarist
- Tommie Reynolds (born 1941), Major League Baseball outfielder
- Vernon Reynolds (born 1935), British anthropologist
- Walter Reynolds (died 1327), Archbishop of Canterbury
- Walter H. Reynolds (1901–1987), Mayor of Providence, Rhode Island
- Wellington J. Reynolds (1865–1949), portrait painter and art instructor at the Art Institute of Chicago
- William Reynolds (disambiguation)
- The Reynolds Girls (Linda Reynolds, born 1970 and Aisling Reynolds, born 1972), English dance-pop duo

== Fictional characters ==
- Caroline Reynolds, a character from the television series Prison Break
- Dennis, Deandra and Frank Reynolds, fictional characters who own an Irish pub in the TV series It's Always Sunny in Philadelphia
- Malcolm Reynolds, the captain of the ship Serenity in the TV series Firefly and the film Serenity

== Other ==
- Reynolds cycling team, Spanish professional cycling team

== See also ==
- Rennell (disambiguation)
- Reynald (disambiguation)
- McReynolds

== Bibliography ==
- PAINHA, José Maria. Chá de Azeite – O Trajecto Empresarial da Casa Reynolds no Alentejo e Extremadura (1838–1890). Estremoz:Câmara Municipal de Estremoz, 2008. ISBN 978-989-95187-8-0.
