= John Reynolds =

John Reynolds may refer to:

== Entertainment ==
- John Reynolds (actor) (born 1991), American actor and writer
- John Reynolds (musician), record producer, the first husband of singer Sinéad O'Connor
- John Reynolds (writer) (1588–1655), English merchant and writer
- John Hamilton Reynolds (1794–1852), English poet, satirist, critic, and playwright
- John Lawrence Reynolds (born 1939), Canadian author
- Jonathan Reynolds (writer) (1942–2021), American actor and writer
- Jock Reynolds (John M. Reynolds, born 1947), American museum director, visual artist, and curator

== Military ==
- John Reynolds (Roundhead) (1625–1657), soldier in the English Civil War
- John Reynolds (Royal Navy officer) (1713–1788), British naval officer and governor of the Province of Georgia
- John F. Reynolds (1820–1863), American army officer active in the US Civil War
- John Williams Reynolds (1817–1874), British cavalry officer and researcher into organic chemistry

== Politics ==
=== Ireland ===
- John Reynolds (Dublin politician) (1797–1868)
- John Reynolds (Leitrim politician) (1670–1699), Irish member of parliament

=== US ===
- John Reynolds (Pennsylvania politician, born 1787) (1787–1853), Pennsylvania politician, editor of the Lancaster Journal
- John Reynolds (Illinois politician) (1788–1865), American politician, governor of Illinois
- John Reynolds (Indiana politician) (1814–1890), American politician from Indiana
- John A. Reynolds (1820–1889), American politician from Pennsylvania
- John D. Reynolds (1870–1958), American politician from Nebraska
- John F. Reynolds (politician) (1852–1934), American politician from Wisconsin
- John Hazard Reynolds (1819–1875), American politician from New York
- John Merriman Reynolds (1848–1933), American politician from Pennsylvania
- John W. Reynolds Sr. (1876–1958), American politician from Wisconsin
- John W. Reynolds Jr. (1921–2002), American politician, governor of Wisconsin

=== Others ===
- John Reynolds (Canadian politician) (born 1942), Canadian politician from British Columbia
- Jonathan Reynolds (born 1980), British politician, Labour Co-operative MP for Stalybridge and Hyde

== Science and technology ==
- John Reynolds (agriculturist) (1703–1779), English farmer and agricultural innovator
- John Reynolds (astronomer) (1874–1949), British astronomer
- John Reynolds (ecologist) (born 1959), Canadian ecologist
- John Reynolds (physicist) (1923–2000), American physicist
- John Reynolds (researcher), New Zealand medical researcher
- John C. Reynolds (1935–2013), American computer scientist
- John Russell Reynolds (1828–1896), British neurologist
- John Reynolds (neuroscientist), American neuroscientist

== Sports ==
- John Reynolds (motorcyclist) (born 1963), British motorcycle racer
- John J. Reynolds (1889–1987), American track and field athlete

== Other people ==
- John Reynolds (priest), English Anglican priest
- John Reynolds (epigrammatist) (1584–1614), English epigrammatist
- J. F. Reynolds (John F. Reynolds), American architect
- John Henry Reynolds (educator) (1842–1927), British champion of technical education
- John N. Reynolds, British banker
- John W. Reynolds (Oregon attorney) (1875–1942), American attorney and educator

== See also ==
- Reynolds-Morris House, in Philadelphia, Pennsylvania, built in 1786–87 by John and William Reynolds
- Jon A. Reynolds (1937–2022), United States Air Force officer
- Jack Reynolds (disambiguation)
- Gen. John F. Reynolds School, in Philadelphia, Pennsylvania, United States
- John Rainolds or Reynolds (1549–1607), English academic and churchman
- John Reynolds Gardiner (1944–2006), American author and engineer
- John Reynold, MP for Bath, England
