= Joe Reynolds =

Joe Reynolds may refer to:

- Joe Reynolds (rugby union) (born 1989), New Zealand rugby union player
- Joe Reynolds (baseball), American baseball player
- Jo Reynolds, fictional character in the US TV soap opera Melrose Place, played by Daphne Zuniga

== See also ==
- Joey Reynolds, American radio show host and disc jockey
- Joel Reynolds (born 1984), Australian rules footballer
- Joel Reynolds (EastEnders), fictional character in the UK TV soap opera EastEnders, played by Cavan Clerkin
- Joseph Reynolds (disambiguation)
