= Christopher Reynolds =

Christopher Reynolds may refer to:

- Christopher A. Reynolds, American musicologist and academic
- Christopher Reynolds (linguist) (1922–2015), British linguist
- Christopher Reynolds (politician) (1611–1654), early American settler and politician
- Christopher Augustine Reynolds (1834–1893), bishop
- Paul Reynolds (BBC journalist) (Christopher Paul Michel Reynolds, born 1946), BBC foreign correspondent
- Christopher S. Reynolds, astronomer

== See also ==
- Chris Reynolds (disambiguation)
- Christopher Reynalds (born 1952), British child actor and motor racing champion
