= Richard Reynolds =

Richard or Dick Reynolds may refer to:

- Richard Reynolds (martyr) (c. 1492–1535), English monk
- Richard Reynolds (bishop) (1674–1743), English bishop of Lincoln
- Richard Reynolds (ironmaster) (1735–1816), manager of and partner in the Coalbrookdale Company and associated ironworks
- Richard S. Reynolds Sr. (1881–1955), founder of Reynolds Metals
- Richard S. Reynolds, Jr. (1908–1980), president of Reynolds Metals
- Richard Reynolds (footballer) (born 1980), Guyana footballer
- R. J. Reynolds (Richard Joshua Reynolds, 1850–1918), American businessman and founder of the R. J. Reynolds Tobacco Company
- Richard Reynolds (chemist) (1829–1900), English pharmaceutical chemist and instrument maker
- Dick Reynolds (Richard Sylvannus Reynolds, 1915–2002), Australian rules footballer
- Dick Reynolds (musician), musician, songwriter and trombonist
- Dick Reynolds (politician) (Richard Floyd Reynolds, 1927–2014), American politician
