= William Reynolds =

Billy, Bill, Will or William Reynolds may refer to:

== Entertainment industry figures ==
- William Reynolds (actor) (1931–2022), American film and TV second lead
- William Reynolds (film editor) (1910–1997), American winner of two Academy Awards
- Bill Reynolds (producer), American rock musician and songwriter active since 2002

== Industrialists ==
- William Reynolds (industrialist) (1758–1803), English ironmaster, built Ketley Canal
- William Bainbridge Reynolds (1855–1935), English metal craftsman and engineer
- William Neal Reynolds (1863–1951), American tobacco manufacturer

== Military men ==
- William Reynolds (naval officer) (1815–1879), Union Navy admiral in American Civil War
- William Reynolds (VC) (1827–1869), Scottish private who received Victoria Cross
- William E. Reynolds (1860–1944), United States Coast Guard commandant

== Politicians ==
- William Reynolds (New Zealand politician) (1822–1899), New Zealand politician and businessman
- William H. Reynolds (New York politician), American real estate developer and New York state senator
- William Hayden Reynolds (1847–1935), American mayor of Orlando, Florida 1910–1913
- William James Reynolds (1856–1934), Irish nationalist politician and MP for East Tyrone, 1885–1895
- William George Waterhouse Reynolds, English member of parliament for Leicester South in 1922–23
- J. William Reynolds, mayor of Bethlehem, Pennsylvania

== Scholars ==
- William Reynolds (theologian) (1544–1594), English Catholic biblical translator and scholar a/k/a Reginaldus
- William Craig Reynolds (1933–2004), American engineer and physicist
- William D. Reynolds (1867–1951), American Southern Presbyterian missionary and Bible translator in Korea
- William Morton Reynolds (1812–1876), American minister, college president and translator

== Sportsmen ==
=== American football ===
- William Ayres Reynolds (1874–1928), American college player and coach of football and baseball
- Billy Reynolds (American football) (1931–2002), American halfback in NFL and AFL

=== Baseball ===
- Bill Reynolds (catcher) (1884–1924), American catcher for New York Yankees
- Bill Reynolds (second baseman) (1929–1989), American Negro leagues baseball player

=== Football ===
- William Reynolds (footballer, born 1870) (1870–after 1893), English left back
- William Reynolds (footballer, born 1879) (1879–1973), English forward
- Billy Reynolds (footballer) (1864–after 1892), English centre-forward

=== Auto racing ===
- Bill Reynolds, Australian driver in 1963 Armstrong 500

== Others ==
- Will Reynolds (c. 1867–1902), American murderer
- William Bradford Reynolds (1942–2019), American lawyer; assistant attorney general 1981–88

== Characters ==
- Bill Reynolds (Tea and Sympathy) in Robert Anderson's 1953 American play
- Bill Reynolds (Love Thy Neighbour) in 1972–76 British sitcom

== See also ==
- Reynolds-Morris House, in Philadelphia, Pennsylvania, built in 1786–87 by John and William Reynolds
- William F. Raynolds (1820–1894), American army officer and explorer
- Bill Rennells (born 1931), English journalist and radio broadcaster
