= James Reynolds =

James or Jim Reynolds may refer to:

== Arts and entertainment ==
- James Reynolds (artist) (1891-1957), American writer, painter, illustrator, set designer and costume designer
- James Reynolds (actor) (born 1946), American actor
- James Reynolds (composer) (born 1953), American composer of music for radio plays, theatre and opera
- James Reynolds (journalist) (born 1974), BBC correspondent in Rome
- Jimmy Reynolds (1904–1963), American jazz pianist

== Government ==
- Sir James Reynolds, 1st Baronet (1865–1932), British Conservative party politician
- James Reynolds (Irish politician) (born 1968), Irish farmer and nationalist politician
- James Reynolds (judge) (1684–1747), chief justice of the Irish Common Pleas
- James Reynolds (junior) (1686–1739), British member of parliament for Bury St Edmunds, 1717–25
- James B. Reynolds (1779–1851), U.S. representative from Tennessee
- James Burton Reynolds (1870–1948), assistant secretary of the United States Treasury where he was accused of taking bribes from the Sugar Trust
- James C. Reynolds (1849–1933), Wisconsin state senator
- James Henry Reynolds (1844–1932), Irish Victoria Cross recipient
- James J. Reynolds Jr. (1907–1986), undersecretary of labor to US President Lyndon Johnson
- James M. Reynolds (1830–1899), American pioneer and politician
- Jim Reynolds (politician), member of the Oklahoma Senate

== Sports ==
- James Reynolds (cricketer) (1866–1950), English cricketer
- James Reynolds (sailor), American sailor in the Star class
- Jim Reynolds (umpire) (born 1968), American baseball umpire
- Jim Reynolds (Canadian football) (born 1938), American football player for several CFL teams
- Jim Reynolds (American football) (1920–1985), American football fullback
- Jim Reynolds (ice hockey), American ice hockey player and coach
- Jim Tom Reynolds, college football player
- Jimmy Reynolds (baseball) (1920–1986), American baseball player
- James Reynolds (shot putter), winner of the 1936 NCAA Division I outdoor shot put championship

== Other people ==
- James Emerson Reynolds (1844–1920), Irish chemist
- James J. Reynolds (educator) (1874–1945), American educator and father of James J. Reynolds Jr.
- James Reynolds, husband of Maria Reynolds, mistress of American politician Alexander Hamilton
