= Mark Reynolds =

Mark Reynolds may refer to:

- Mark Reynolds (baseball) (born 1983), Major League Baseball player
- Mark Reynolds (basketball) (born 1984), Irish basketball player
- Mark Reynolds (footballer, born 1966), English footballer
- Mark Reynolds (footballer, born 1987), Scottish footballer
- Mark Reynolds (musician), one half of synthpop duo Red Flag
- Mark Reynolds (sailor) (born 1955), American Olympic sailor
