= Chris Reynolds =

Chris Reynolds may refer to:

- Chris Reynolds (author), Welsh comics author
- Chris Reynolds (gridiron football), American football player
- Chris Reynolds, member of Eulogies (band)
- Chris Reynolds, member of Red Flag (band)
- Chris Reynolds, member of This Is Hell (band)
- Chris Reynolds (Home and Away)
- Chris Reynolds, who had $92,233,720,368,547,800 for 2 minutes in 2013

== See also ==
- Christopher Reynolds (disambiguation)
