= Patrick Reynolds =

Patrick Reynolds may refer to:

- Patrick Reynolds (activist) (born 1948), American tobacco scion, anti-smoking activist and former actor
- Patrick Reynolds (Cumann na nGaedheal politician) (1887–1932), Irish politician
  - Patrick J. Reynolds (politician) (1920–2003), his son, Irish Fine Gael politician
- Patrick Reynolds (Gaelic footballer) (active 1960s – 1980s)
- Patrick J. Reynolds (artist) (born 1963), American visual artist and author
- Plain Pat (Patrick Reynolds) (active since 2001), songwriter and record producer
