= Peter Reynolds =

Peter or Pete Reynolds may refer to:

- Peter Reynolds (actor) (1921–1975), British actor
- Peter Reynolds (archaeologist) (1939–2001), British archaeologist
- Peter Reynolds (composer) (1958–2016), Welsh composer and creator of the opera Sands of Time
- Peter Reynolds (physicist), American physicist
- Peter Reynolds (prisoner) (born 1945/46), British-Afghan man
- Peter Reynolds (rowing) (born 1937), British Olympic rower
- Peter Reynolds (swimmer) (1948–2012), Australian Olympic swimmer
- Peter H. Reynolds (born 1961), Canadian American author
- Pete Reynolds (1885–1951), American college football coach
