= Joseph Reynolds =

Joseph Reynolds may refer to:

- Joseph Reynolds (congressman) (1785–1864), U.S. Representative from New York and brigadier general
- Joseph B. Reynolds (1836–1898), Greenback member of the Wisconsin State Assembly
- Joseph J. Reynolds (1822–1899), U.S. Army general in the Civil War and Black Hills War
- Joseph Melvin Reynolds (1924–1997), American physicist
- Joseph "Diamond Jo" Reynolds (1819–1891), American steamboat and railroad operator

== See also ==
- Joie Ray (racing driver) (Joseph Reynolds Ray, Jr., 1923–2007), American open-wheel and stock-car racer
- Joseph Reynolds House, Bristol, Rhode Island
- Joe Reynolds (disambiguation)
- Joey Reynolds, radio host
