= Jack Reynolds =

Jack Reynolds may refer to:

- Jack Reynolds (broadcaster) (1937–2008), American professional wrestling announcer
- Jack Reynolds (footballer, born 1869) (1869–1917), international football player for both Ireland and England
- Jack Reynolds (footballer, born 1881) (1881–1962), English football player and manager of Ajax Amsterdam
- Jack "Hacksaw" Reynolds (born 1947), American football player
- Jack Reynolds (philosopher), Australian philosopher

== See also ==
- John Reynolds (disambiguation)
- Reynolds (surname)
