= Robert Reynolds =

Robert or Rob Reynolds may refer to:

== Arts and entertainment ==
- H. Robert Reynolds (born 1934), American conductor and composer
- Rob Reynolds (artist) (born 1966), American artist
- Rob Reynolds (musician) (born 1967), English singer-songwriter

== Law and politics ==
- Robert Reynolds (MP) (1601–1678), English lawyer and MP
- Robert J. Reynolds (1838–1909), American politician, governor of Delaware
- Robert R. Reynolds (1884–1963), American senator
- Robert R. Reynolds (Florida politician) (born 1949), member of the Florida House of Representatives

== Others ==
- Robert Carthew Reynolds (1745–1811), British Royal Navy admiral
- Robert L. Reynolds (1902–1966), American historian
- Robert Reynolds (fencer) (born 1944), Welsh fencer
- Robert Reynolds (American football) (born 1981), American football linebacker
- Rob Reynolds (journalist), American journalist

== Other uses ==
- Sentry (Robert Reynolds), Marvel Comics character

== See also ==
- Bob Reynolds (disambiguation)
