= John Franklin Miller (California politician) =

American politician (1831–1886)

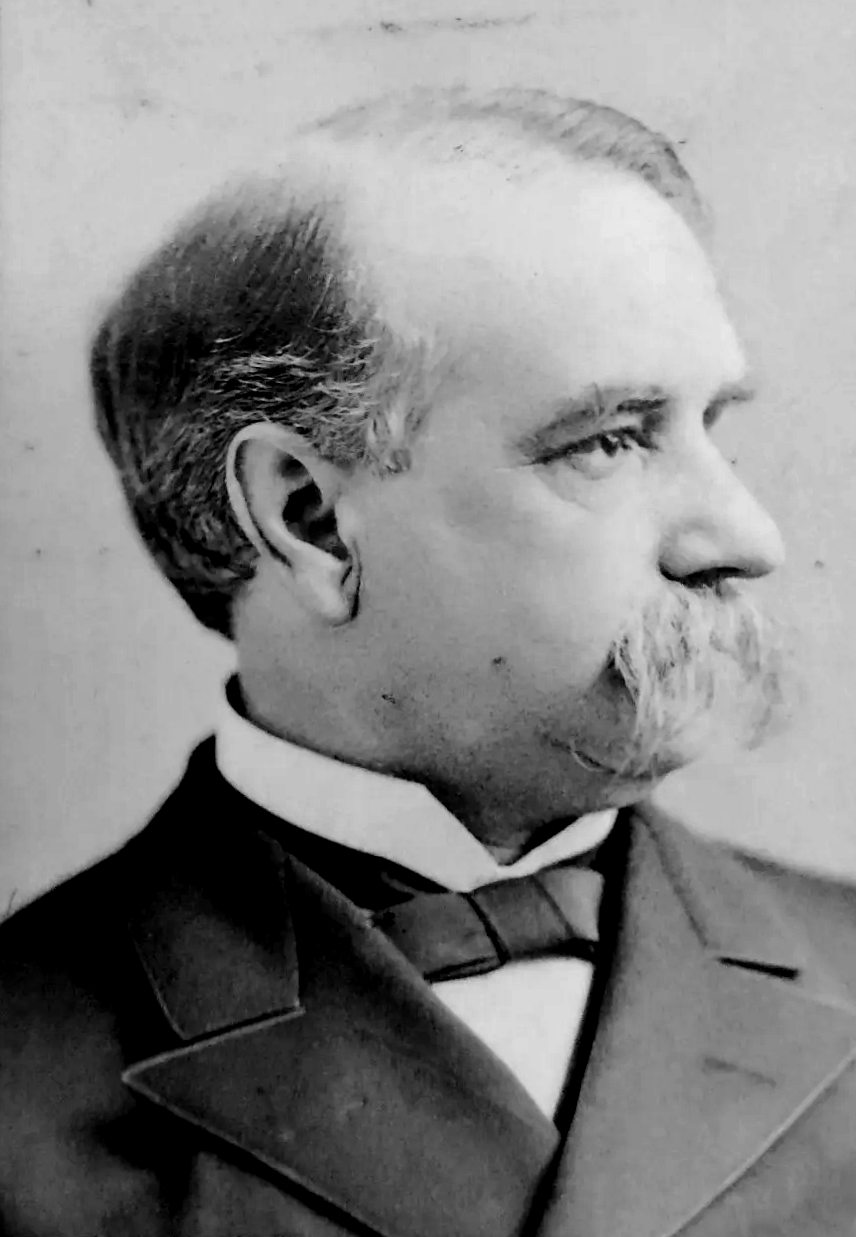

United States Senator from California
- In office March 4, 1881 – March 8, 1886
- Preceded by: Newton Booth
- Succeeded by: George Hearst

Collector of the Port of San Francisco
- In office October 30, 1865 – January 24, 1870
- Appointed by: Andrew Johnson
- Preceded by: Charles James
- Succeeded by: Timothy Guy Phelps

Member of the Indiana Senate
- In office 1861
- Succeeded by: John Reynolds

Personal details
- Born: November 21, 1831 South Bend, Indiana, U.S.
- Died: March 8, 1886 (aged 54) Washington, D.C., U.S.
- Resting place: Arlington National Cemetery; Arlington, Virginia, U.S.
- Party: Republican
- Spouse: Mary Wickerham Chess
- Relations: John Franklin Miller (nephew); Richardson Clover (son-in-law)
- Children: 1
- Parent: William Miller (father)
- Education: State and National Law School
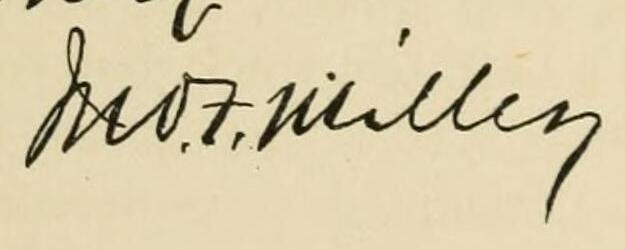
- Signature

Military service
- Allegiance: United States of America; Union
- Branch/service: United States Army; Union Army
- Years of service: 1861–1865
- Rank: Brevet Major General
- Unit: 29th Indiana Infantry Regiment
- Battles/wars: American Civil War; Battle of Shiloh; Siege of Corinth; Battle of Stones River (WIA); Battle of Liberty Gap (WIA); Battle of Nashville

John Franklin Miller (November 21, 1831 – March 8, 1886) was an American lawyer, businessman, and general in the Union Army during the American Civil War. He represented California in the United States Senate from 1881 until his death in 1886. He was a proponent of several bills against Chinese immigrants.

== Early life and career ==
Miller was born in South Bend, Indiana, to William Miller. His nephew, also named John Franklin Miller, was later a congressman from Washington. Both sometimes went by John F. Miller. Miller was educated in South Bend, Chicago, and in Ballston Spa, New York, where he received a law degree in 1852 from the New York State and National Law School. He was admitted to the bar and established a law practice in South Bend, but moved the next year to Napa, California. There, he continued his career as a lawyer, as well as becoming the county treasurer. He returned to South Bend in 1855 and resumed his practice. Miller was elected to the Indiana State Senate in 1860.

== Civil War ==
Colonel Miller c. 1861–1863

Brigadier General Miller c. 1864–1865

With the secession of eleven Southern states and the outbreak of the Civil War, Miller joined the Union Army. On August 27, 1861, Governor Oliver P. Morton commissioned Miller as Colonel of the 29th Indiana Infantry. After training, the regiment was assigned to Kirk's Brigade in Alexander M. McCook's division in Buell's Army of the Ohio and marched to Tennessee. Miller saw action on the second day of the Battle of Shiloh, as well as during the subsequent Siege of Corinth. Miller led his regiment through northern Alabama and Tennessee and pursued Braxton Bragg through Kentucky. Miller commanded a brigade under James Negley during the Battle of Stones River in late December 1862. On the second day of the battle, Miller spearheaded the Federal counterattack across Stones River which repulsed John C. Breckinridge's Confederate attack. During this charge Miller was wounded in the neck.

During the Tullahoma Campaign, Miller commanded a brigade under General McCook in the XX Corps. He was severely wounded, losing his left eye, in a minor fight at Liberty Gap on June 27, 1863, and was out of action for nearly a year while he recuperated. Miller was promoted to brigadier general April 10, 1864, retroactive to January 5. In May 1864, he was assigned to administrative duty as commander of the garrison at Nashville, Tennessee. He returned to the field in December, commanding a sizable force of infantry and artillery at the Battle of Nashville. For his services at that battle, Miller was brevetted as a major general on March 13, 1865.

== Return to California ==
Engraving by J. A. J. Wilcox, 1881

Miller declined a commission as a colonel in the Regular Army and resigned from the Volunteers on September 29, 1865, to move back to California when President Andrew Johnson appointed him as collector of customs of the Port of San Francisco, a post he held until 1870 when he declined another term. He turned to business interests, and served for 12 years as the President of the Alaska Commercial Company, which controlled the fur industry in newly acquired Pribilof Islands.

Miller purchased the property which was part of Rancho Yajome in Napa Valley in the year 1869. At the time Miller bought this holding, it was entirely wilderness area. General and Mrs. Miller purchased the property in several parcels from different grantors, including the United States via a deed signed by President U.S. Grant and the State of California by a deed signed by Governor Newton Booth. Deeds conveying the various parcels to the General were dated in the years 1869, 1872, 1873 and 1881. Silverado Country Club now occupies the property.

An illustration by George Frederick Keller published in The Wasp depicting the Miller's election to the United States Senate, January 22, 1881

Miller returned to politics, from 1878–79 as a member of the second state constitutional convention. The California state legislature elected the Republican Miller as one of the state's two Senators in 1881. He was an outspoken proponent of several bills to limit the influx and influence of Chinese immigrants. He expressed his sentiments during passage of the 1882 Chinese Exclusion Act:

"One complete man, the product of free institutions and high civilization, is worth more to the world than hundreds of barbarians. Upon what other theory can we justify the almost complete extermination of the Indians, the original possessor of all these States? I believe that one such man as Newton, or Franklin, or Lincoln, glorifies the creator of the world and benefits mankind more than all the Chinese who have lived, struggled and died on the banks of the Hoang Ho."

— 13 Cong. Rec. 1,487 (1882).

He was chairman, Committee to Revise the Laws of the United States (Forty-seventh Congress) and served on the Committee on Foreign Relations (Forty-ninth Congress).

Senator Miller died in Washington, D.C., while in office. He was initially buried in the Laurel Hill Cemetery in San Francisco, but was reinterred in the Arlington National Cemetery on May 5, 1913, alongside his wife Mary Wickerham (Chess) Miller, his daughter, and his son-in-law, Rear Admiral Richardson Clover.

== Caricature gallery ==
"Major General Cobb of the Cal. N. G. Handing Over His Sword & Hat to Gen. J. F. Miller"

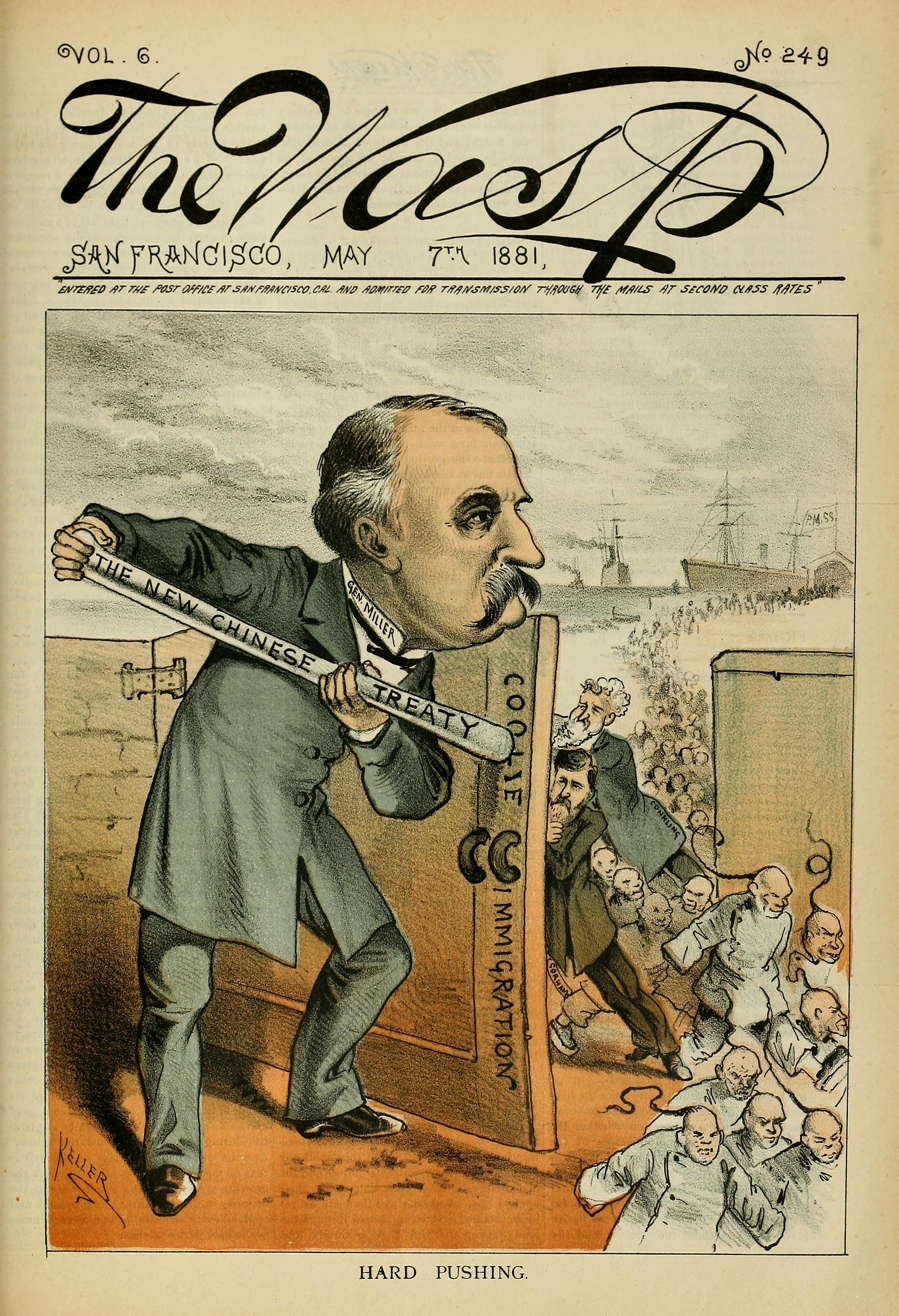
"Hard Pushing"

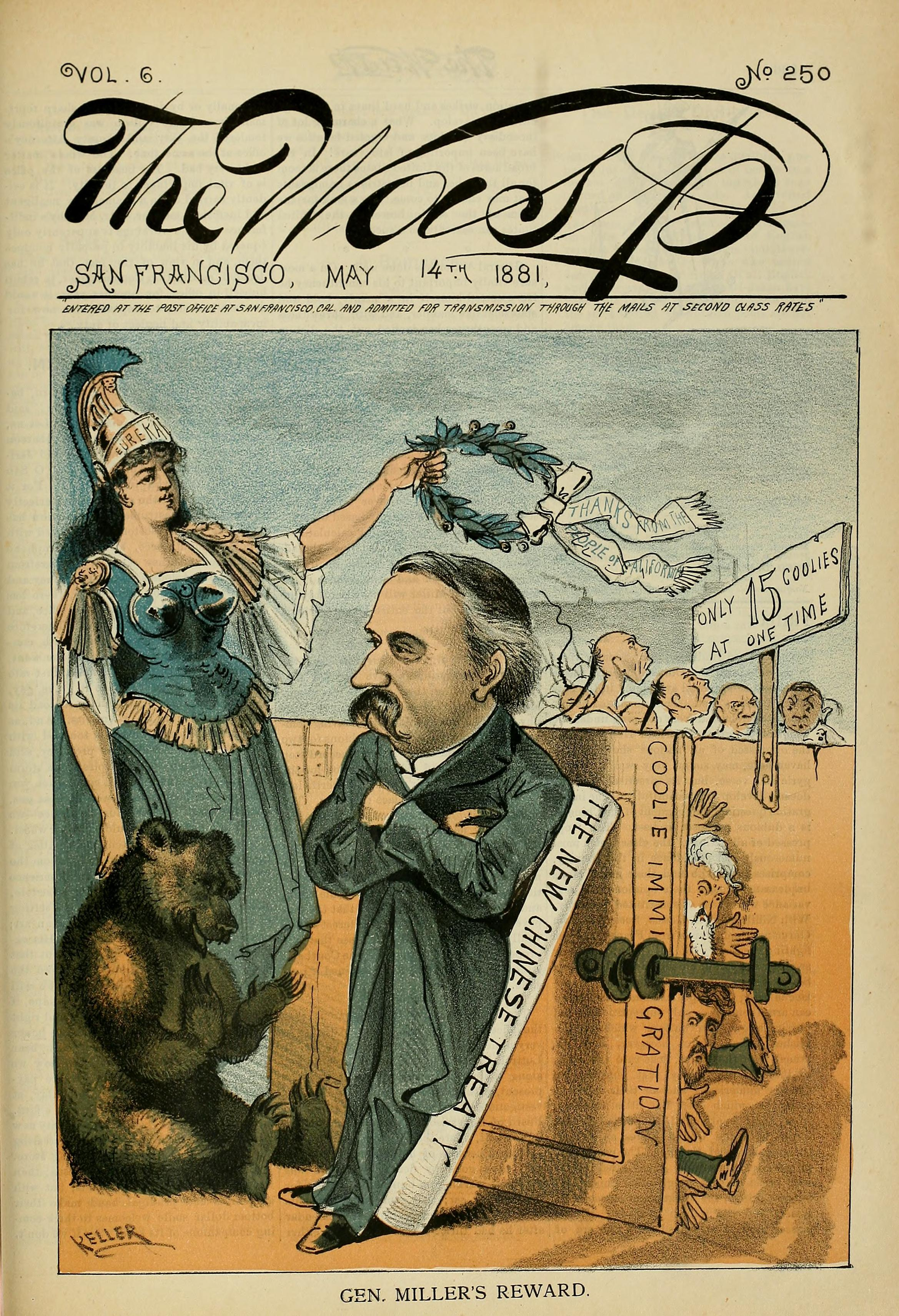
"Gen. Miller's Reward"

"The Chinese Question. The Remedy Too Late"

"St. Valentine"

"Capital Stocks"

"Our Veterans and Their Commanders"

"The Great Oak Has Fallen"

== See also ==
- List of American Civil War generals (Union)
- List of members of the United States Congress who died in office (1790–1899)

== Sources ==
- Eicher, John H., and Eicher, David J., Civil War High Commands, Stanford University Press, 2001, ISBN 0-8047-3641-3.
- Warner, Ezra J., Generals in Blue: Lives of the Union Commanders, Louisiana State University Press, 1964, ISBN 0-8071-0822-7

U.S. Senate
Preceded by Newton Booth	U.S. senator (Class 1) from California; 1881–1886; Served alongside: James T. Farley, Leland Stanford	Succeeded by George Hearst
