= 29th Indiana Infantry Regiment =

29th Regiment Indiana Volunteer Infantry
- Flag of the United States, 1863-1865
- Active: August 27, 1861, to December 2, 1865
- Country: United States
- Allegiance: Union
- Branch: Infantry
- Engagements: Battle of Shiloh; Battle of Stones River; Battle of Chickamauga

The 29th Indiana Volunteer Infantry Regiment was an infantry regiment that served in the Union Army during the American Civil War.

== Service ==
Major General John Franklin Miller of 29th Indiana Infantry Regiment. From the Liljenquist Family Collection of Civil War Photographs, Prints and Photographs Division, Library of Congress

- The 29th Indiana Volunteer Infantry was organized at La Porte, Indiana, on August 27, 1861.
- Battle of Shiloh
- Siege of Corinth
- Battle of Stones River
- Battle of Liberty Gap
- Battle of Chickamauga
- The regiment mustered out of service on December 2, 1865.

== Total strength and casualties ==
The regiment lost 4 officers and 56 enlisted men killed in action or died of wounds and 4 officers and 240 enlisted men who died of disease, for a total of 304 fatalities.

== Commanders ==
- Colonel John Franklin Miller

== See also ==
- List of Indiana Civil War regiments
- Indiana in the Civil War
