= William Miller (Indiana politician) =

American politician (1809–1879)

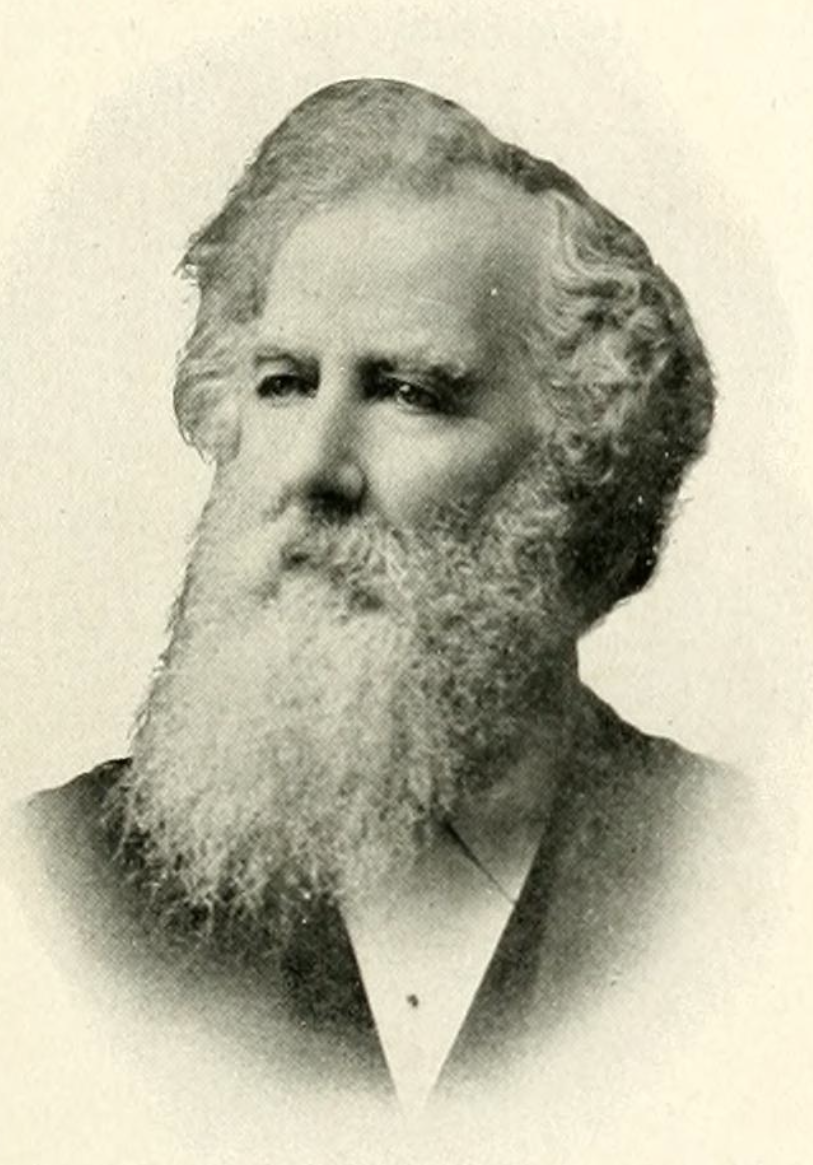

Member of the Indiana House of Representatives
- In office 1844–1850

Personal details
- Born: April 1, 1809 Franklin County, Virginia, U.S.
- Died: May 2, 1879 (aged 70) South Bend, Indiana, U.S.
- Party: Whig; Republican
- Spouse: Mary Miller (m. 1833)
- Children: 9, including John F.
- Occupation: Farmer; politician

William Miller (April 1, 1809 – May 2, 1879) was a politician and farmer from Indiana. He served in the Indiana House of Representatives from 1844 to 1850.

== Early life ==
William Miller was born on April 1, 1809, in Franklin County, Virginia, to Sarah and Tobias Miller. When he was one year old, Miller moved with his family to Union County, Indiana. There he grew up and was educated.

== Career ==
After marrying, Miller moved to St. Joseph County, Indiana. He ran a farm on Portage Prairie (now German Township).

Miller was originally a Whig, but later became a Republican. Miller was elected as justice of the peace. He held that position for several years. In 1844, Miller served in the Indiana House of Representatives. He served for three terms, until 1850. He served in the South Bend City Council from 1865 to 1871. In 1868, Miller helped lobby the Singer Corporation to set up a plant in South Bend.

== Personal life ==
Miller married Mary Miller, daughter of Colonel John Miller, in May 1833. They had nine children, including John F., Henry Clay, William H., Horace G., Isaac Newton and Martha. His son John F. served in the Union Army as a major general and served in the Indiana Senate. His son Horace G. worked as postmaster of South Bend. His son Isaac Newton served as county commissioner.

In 1858, Miller moved from his farm to Lafayette Boulevard in South Bend. He died on May 2, 1879, in South Bend.

== Legacy ==
According to local historians, Miller Road in South Bend is believed to be named after Miller.
