= Jerry Reynolds =

Jerry Reynolds may refer to:

- Jerry Reynolds (American football) (born 1970), American football offensive lineman
- Jerry Reynolds (basketball, born 1944), American former professional basketball coach and current executive in the NBA
- Jerry Reynolds (basketball, born 1962), retired American professional basketball player
- Jerry Reynolds (footballer) (1867–1944), Scottish footballer

== See also ==
- Gerry Reynolds (disambiguation)
- Gerald Reynolds (disambiguation)
