= John N. Reynolds =

Investment banker and CEO of Castle Water

- Born: September 8, 1966 (age 60)
- Education: Cambridge University
- Occupations: Business executive and financial author
- Notable work: Ethics in Investments Banking

John N. Reynolds is a British investment banker, business executive and financial author who wrote 'Ethics in Investments Banking' and 'Sharing Profits'.

During his investment banking career he covered equity research, mergers & acquisitions, financial restructuring and principal investment. As equity analyst he led multi-billion dollar acquisitions, and originated high-return investment strategies. In 2014 he became CEO of UK water company Castle Water.

== Early life and education ==
Reynolds attended Ward Freman comprehensive school in Hertfordshire and studied theology at Cambridge University.

== Career ==
Reynolds had a 20 year career in investment banking where he covered equity research, mergers & acquisitions, financial restructuring and principal investment. Reynolds joined HSBC in early 1990s as electricity industry analyst. He moved to investment banking side in 1997 and then went to Credit Suisse First Boston in 1999. He joined US investment bank Houlihan Lokey Howard & Zukin in 2001 and then moved to Japanese bank Nikko. As equity analyst he led multi-billion dollar acquisitions, and originated high-return investment strategies.

From 2006 to 2011 he chaired the Church of England Ethical Investment Advisory Group, which advises the Church's major investment bodies on ethical and governance issues in their global investment portfolio. He became a director of the Central Finance Board of the Methodist Church and a member of the Scottish Episcopal Church investment committee, as well as being a director of a number of companies.

Since 2014 Reynolds has been Director and CEO of Castle Water.

== Recognition ==
Reynolds is a Fellow of the Institution of Engineering and Technology, and is a former member of the Water Industry Commission for Scotland. John received an OBE in 2012 for his services to Save the Children.
