= Patrick J. Reynolds (artist) =

Patrick J. Reynolds (born 1963 in New Orleans, Louisiana) is a noted visual artist and published author. Reynolds' work is in collections throughout the United States, including the Pentagon, Covenant Hospice non-profit art center, and Tyndall Air force Base. He is known for his unusual style and application of materials where he creates large-scale works. He is also known for his dynamic teaching style, including the use of a variety of tools in the art world such as the airbrush and raw graphite.

== Exhibitions ==
Reynolds' work has been exhibited in one man shows in galleries and gala events, including the Wyland Gallery, Allure Gallery, Reynolds Gallery (Birmingham, Alabama).

== Books ==
Reynolds is an accomplished author, with titles including Principals of Peace, Journey of Dreams, and Tears of a Dreamer. He has also created a series of videos on the subject of airbrush uses ranging from lettering, color theory, and painting directly on metal.

== Articles ==
Patrick has written articles in many publications on a wide scope of the art world, many in Airbrush Action Magazine (Newark, New Jersey), for example "Airbrushing Special Effects on Vinyl" in Signs of the Times Magazine and "How to Start a Vinyl Lettering Business" in Sign Builder Other articles include pieces in Art Business News, The News Herald, Airbrush Zeitung, and Truckin Magazine.

== Charities ==
Reynolds has been involved heavily in charities such as [http://www.chsfl.org/Home . Children's Home Society for battered women and children, and Covenant Hospice., where fine art is auctioned off and proceeds go directly to help those in need.

== Works ==
Major works include, Heaven's Hues America, Principals of Peace, Beyond the Storm, Tears of a Dreamer, Journey of Dreams, Amore Di Dio, Bella Rosa, and Eternal Embrace.
