= Andrew Reynolds =

Andrew Reynolds may refer to:

- Andrew Reynolds (archaeologist), English archaeologist
- Andrew Reynolds (political scientist) (born 1967), professor of political science at the University of North Carolina
- Andrew Reynolds (skateboarder) (born 1978), American skateboarder
- Andrew Reynolds (fencer) (born 1943), Welsh fencer
