= William Reynolds (naval officer) =

American admiral and explorer

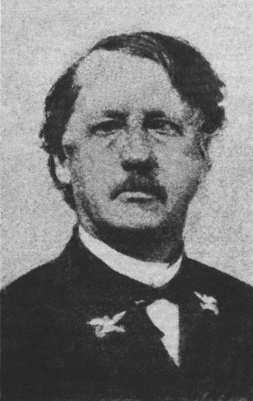
- Born: December 10, 1815; Lancaster, Pennsylvania, U.S.
- Died: November 5, 1879 (aged 63); Washington, D.C., U.S.
- Burial place: Lancaster Cemetery
- Relatives: John F. Reynolds (brother)
- Military career
- Allegiance: United States
- Branch: United States Navy
- Service years: 1831–1877
- Rank: Rear admiral
- Commands: Vermont; New Hampshire; Lackawanna; Asiatic Squadron
- Conflicts: American Civil War

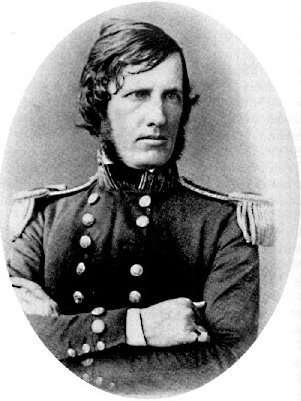
William Reynolds at younger age

William Reynolds (December 10, 1815 – November 5, 1879) was a rear admiral in the United States Navy who served during the American Civil War. His younger brother was United States Army general John F. Reynolds.

Reynolds was born in Lancaster, Pennsylvania on December 10, 1815, to Lydia Moore and John Reynolds, and joined the Navy in 1831. His first assignment was to the Boxer, in which he toured Africa, Brazil and the Malay Archipelago. In 1837, he was promoted to passed midshipman and to lieutenant in 1841.

From 1838 to 1842, he served with the U.S. Exploring Expedition, and was among the first to sight the Antarctic mainland, along with Henry Eld. In 1842, he was assigned to the Cumberland.

In 1862, he was promoted to commander and given his first ship, the Vermont, a receiving ship at Port Royal, South Carolina. (When that ship was replaced by the New Hampshire, he was transferred to command it.) He was subsequently given command of the depot there.

In 1865, Reynolds was promoted to captain and given command of the screw sloop Lackawanna after the American Civil War, assigned to the Pacific. In 1867, he was the officer to formally claim the Midway Atoll for the United States, after its discovery by a sealing ship in 1859. In 1870, he was made a commodore and was made the Chief of the Bureau of Equipment. In 1873, he was promoted to rear admiral and given command of the Asiatic Squadron from his flagship, the steam frigate Tennessee. Reynolds served as the acting Secretary of the United States Navy in 1874.

His last foreign tour included an official visit to China. Reynolds' wife, Rebecca Krug Reynolds, became the first American woman to walk on the Great Wall of China.

In 1877, due to failing health, he retired from active service. Reynolds died in Washington, D.C., on November 5, 1879, and is buried next to his younger brother, John F. Reynolds, in the cemetery in Lancaster, Pennsylvania.

== See also ==
Military offices
| Preceded by Robert F. R. Lewis | Commander, Asiatic Squadron; 16 August 1875–12 August 1877 | Succeeded by Jonathan Young |
