= Bob Reynolds =

Bob or Bobby Reynolds may refer to:

- Bob Reynolds (American football, born 1914) (1914–1994), American football player
- Bobby Reynolds (American football) (1931–1985), American football player
- Bob Reynolds (American football, born 1939) (1939–1996), American football player
- Bob Reynolds (baseball) (born 1947), Major League Baseball pitcher
- Bobby Reynolds (ice hockey) (born 1967), American ice hockey player
- Bob Reynolds (saxophonist) (born 1977), American jazz saxophonist
- Bobby Reynolds (born 1982), American tennis player

== See also ==
- Robert Reynolds (disambiguation)
