= Christopher Reynolds (linguist) =

Christopher Hanby Baillie Reynolds (29 July 1922 – 3 April 2015) was the first British academic to study the Maldivian language.

He wrote the first English-Maldivian dictionary: this complied with the Maldive Government's 1970's then Roman-transliteration scheme. The material was available to academics from the 1970s, and finally published in 432 pages with 5000 individual entries in 2003. The dictionary complemented his 1993 150-page Maldives (World Bibliographical Series number 158) book.

During his career as a Sinhalese lecturer at the School of Oriental and African Studies (SOAS) in London he taught and extensively researched the Sinhalese language and its pre-1815 literature: the Sri Lankan government awarded him the Sri Lanka Ranajana medal for this.

== Education interrupted by war service ==
Christopher Hanby Baillie Reynolds was born 29 July 1922 in St Albans, England; his father was the registrar of the Corporation of the Sons of the Clergy. Christopher's school education was at Winchester College. His Honour Mods studies including Modern Languages at New College, Oxford were interrupted in 1942 by World War II war service in Italy, taking him after the war (but still in the army) to Sri Lanka (then Ceylon) where he was fascinated by the Sinhalese language, script and culture. After the war, with a Forlong scholarship, he gained a BA degree in Sinhalese at SOAS.

== SOAS career ==
After graduating at SOAS, he was promptly appointed to a Sinhalese lectureship there. For some of his overseas research leave in Sri Lanka, he studied with Buddhist monks. When in the Maldives, then hardly ever visited by foreigners, he studied the Maldivian language, which is related to Sinhalese.

His English-Maldivian dictionary; Bilingual edition was published by Routledge on 17 April 2003, ISBN 978-04152980-87.

His Sinhalese language publications included:

- Linguistic studies of early Sinhalese in the Bulletin of the British Association of Orientalists.
- The 377-page An anthology of Sinhalese literature up to 1815, selected by the UNESCO National Commission of Ceylon
- Sinhalese: An introductory course, SOAS, 1981, 1995

For over 10 years he was employed to monitor the BBC’s Sinhalese programs.

== Family ==
He married Jane Batten in Hampstead Parish Church, London in July 1952 and lived in Westerham, Kent from 1957. They sang in the Bach Choir in London from about 1942 and were keen musicians. Many holidays were spent camping in Welcome valley close to the north-coast border of Devon and Cornwall. They had four children: Tristram, Ben, Lucy and David.

Christopher died on 3 April 2015, aged 92: he and Jane (who died on 1 May 2008) share a grave near the north boundary of Westerham Church churchyard.
