= Rob Reynolds (artist) =

American artist (born 1966)

Rob Reynolds (born 1966) is an American contemporary artist. He lives and works in Los Angeles, California.

== Early life and education ==
Rob Reynolds was born in Newton, Massachusetts, in 1966. He received an A.B. in Art and Semiotics from Brown University in 1990, and continued his education at the Whitney Museum Independent Study Program in 1992. He previously studied at the Boston Museum School. Reynolds worked with Robert Coles serving as Senior Teaching Fellow at Harvard College from 2000 to 2002.

== Work ==
Reynolds makes paintings, sculpture, sound and video artwork. His work references pop art, minimalism, and conceptual art, and engages with ecological issues.

In a conversation with the artist and the novelist Emma Cline, Cline notes that Reynolds's “work attempts to make the concepts of scope and time and environment somehow perceivable.” In an essay titled “Seeing Nature (After the Human), on Painting as Philosophy,” philosopher Tobias Rees writes, “Reynolds’ paintings of icebergs, glaciers, shipwrecks, botanicals and suns are contemporary studies of how we have come to see – and experience – nature.” “His current practice includes sculpture, video, digital work, sound and collaboration with earth scientists.” Ralph Rugoff writes that “Reynolds’ paintings invite us to look and also to read, as they feature short caption-like texts that are often equally enigmatic and descriptive.”

== Exhibitions ==
In 2021, Reynolds had a solo gallery exhibition titled “Overview” at Anthony Meier Fine Arts, San Francisco, CA. In 2017, Reynolds had a solo exhibition titled “Vanishing Point” at LAXART. Reynolds had a solo had gallery solo exhibition titled "Most Painted Mountain" at Ochi Gallery in 2016. He installed the one-person installation “Just Add Water” at the Natural History Museum of Los Angeles County November 2013–March 2015. In 2012 Reynolds had an exhibition of shipwreck paintings titled “The Bohemian Disaster and other Paintings” at Anthony Meier Fine Arts, San Francisco, CA. He has shown his work in group exhibitions at UTA Artists Space, Gagosian Gallery, and the Bell Gallery at Brown University.

== Collections ==
Collections with Reynolds's work include the Los Angeles County Museum of Art, the Natural History Museum of Los Angeles County, the Rhode Island School of Design Museum, and Brown University.

== Recognition ==
Reynolds was a Berggruen Institute Transformations of the Human Artist Fellow alongside Pierre Huyghe, Anicka Yi, Nancy Baker Cahill, Stephanie Dinkins, Mara Eagle, Ian Cheng, Martine Syms, and Agnieszka Kurant.

== Teaching ==
Reynolds has taught at Brown University, Harvard College, University of Southern California, and Sierra Nevada University.

== Music ==
Reynolds played in the band Dungbeetle with novelist Sam Lipsyte, Nicholas Butterworth, and Bruce Oyster Cooley in New York City the 1990s. He worked with James Murphy, who commented in an interview that “Dungbeetle were like Andy Kaufman.” Reynolds contributed album art for the LCD Soundsystem studio album American Dream. Reynolds plays with Noise Heals, a collective of musicians including Craig Wedren, Anna Waronker, Eric Erlandson, Josh Klinghoffer, Joe Wong, and Steven Shane McDonald.
