= Peter Reynolds (physicist) =

American theoretical physicist (born 1949)

Peter James Reynolds
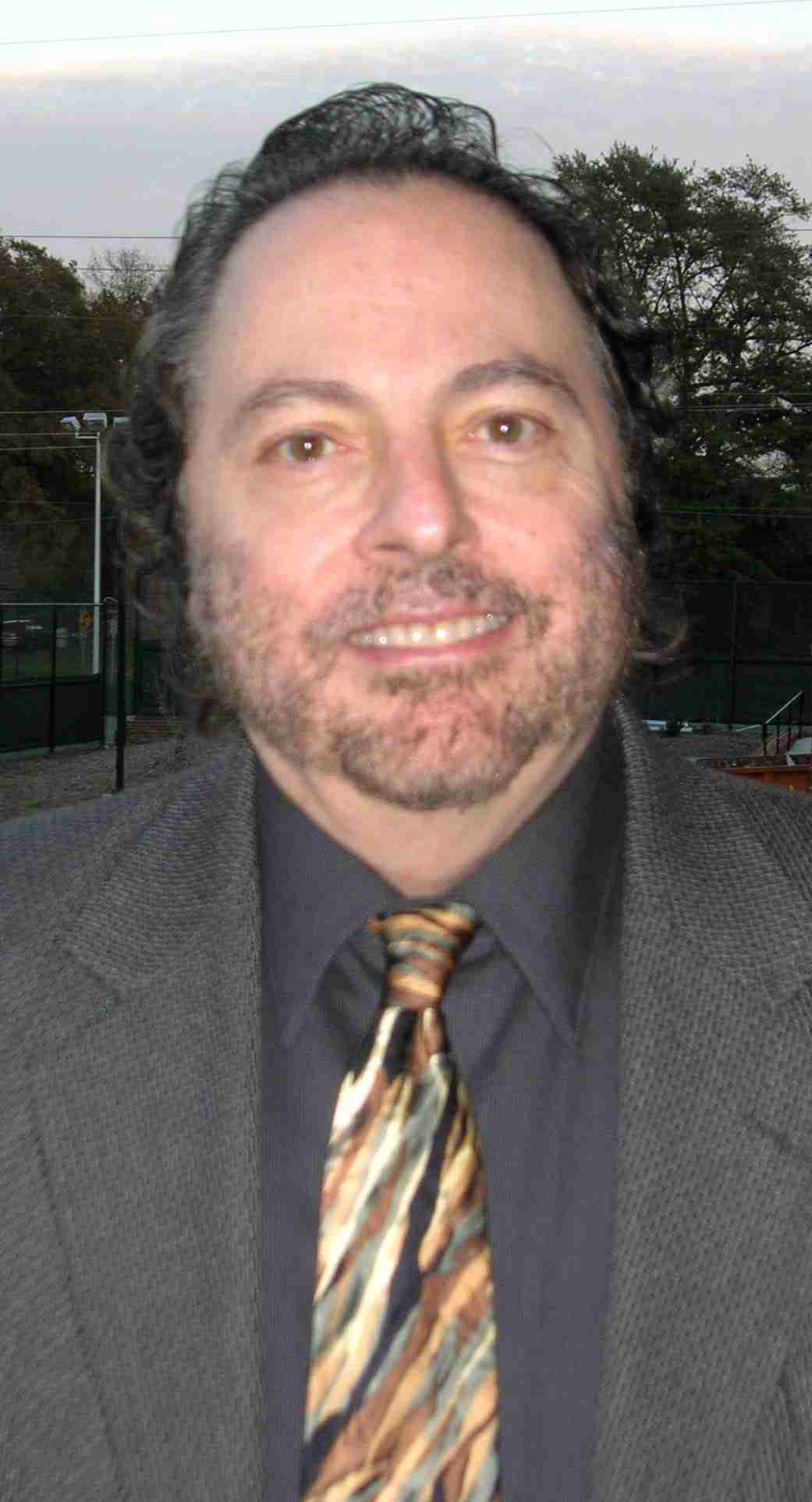
- Born: November 19, 1949 (age 76); New York, New York, U.S.
- Education: Bronx High School of Science
- Alma mater: MIT; UC, Berkeley
- Known for: Monte Carlo Renormalization Group, Quantum Monte Carlo, AMO physics and Quantum Information Science Program Management
- Awards: Presidential Rank Award of Distinguished Senior Professional (2015)
- Scientific career
- Fields: Condensed matter physics, statistical physics, atomic and molecular physics, theoretical chemistry
- Institutions: Army Research Office, Office of Naval Research, Lawrence Berkeley Laboratory, Boston University
- Doctoral advisor: H.E. Stanley

Peter James Reynolds is a theoretical physicist serving as the senior research scientist (ST) for the Physical Sciences at the Army Research Office (ARO), a position he has held since 2007. He was formerly the ARO Physics Division chief and a program manager for atomic and molecular physics. Prior to joining ARO in 2003 he was at the Office of Naval Research, serving as a program officer, starting in 1988.

He was awarded the status of Fellow in the American Physical Society, having been nominated by the Division of Computational Physics in 1995 for

his pioneering work on combining the renormalization group method with Monte Carlo simulations in the study of statistical problems, for his contributions to quantum Monte Carlo (QMC) simulations, and for his service to the physics community through his activities as a Program Officer at the Office of Naval Research.

His QMC work was done while at the Lawrence Berkeley Laboratory (LBL) from 1980 to 1988, initially working there as a staff scientist in the National Resource for Computation in Chemistry (NRCC). His renormalization group work focused on geometric phase transitions such as percolation and their connection to disordered lattice spin models. That work was done as part of his PhD work at MIT and as an assistant research professor at Boston University (BU). Both lines of research have become highly cited.

In his role as a Program Officer at ONR and subsequently as Program Manager at ARO he actively supported and grew the research community exploring ultra-cold atoms and molecules, laser cooling and trapping, quantum degenerate gasses, quantum control, and the nascent stages of exploration of quantum information science.

In 2015 he was honored with the Presidential Rank Award of Distinguished Senior Professional, in part for his role in supporting those advances and for subsequently bringing those research thrusts into the Army Labs through persistent advocacy.

In recognition of his role in the community he was asked to serve on the National Academy of Sciences' Committee doing the 2020 decadal study on the status and future directions of atomic, molecular, and optical (AMO) science, to consider the considerable advances in the field and provide an outlook for AMO for the coming decade.
