= John Reynolds (Indiana politician) =

American politician (1814–1890)

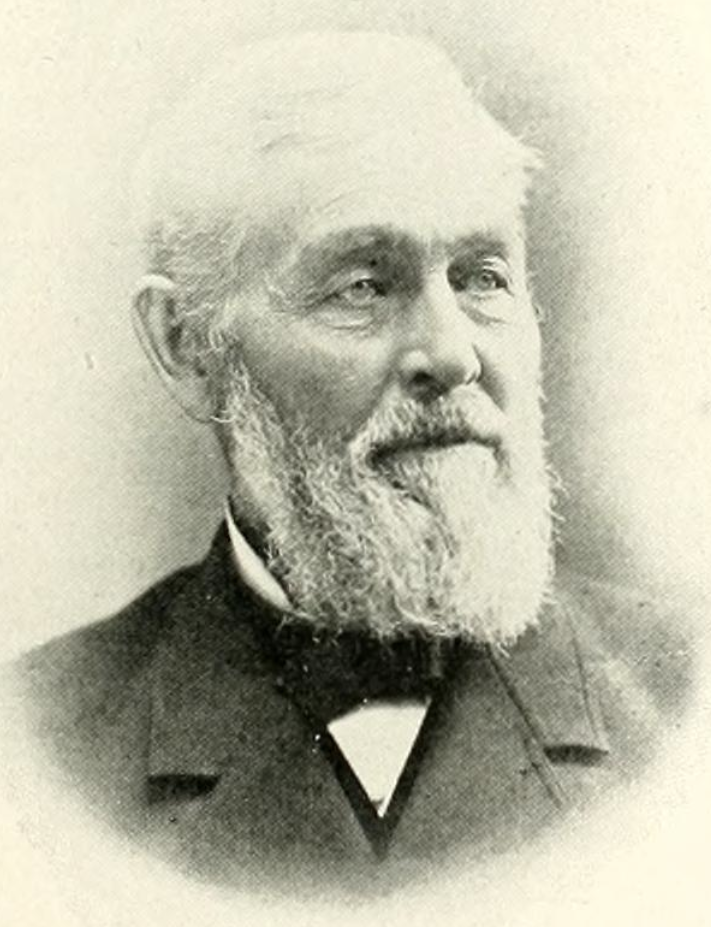
- Reynolds in 1901 publication

Member of the Indiana Senate
- In office 1862
- Preceded by: John F. Miller

Member of the Indiana House of Representatives
- In office 1867
- In office 1850–1851

Personal details
- Born: July 12, 1814 near Lancaster, Ohio, U.S.
- Died: March 30, 1890 (aged 75) St. Joseph County, Indiana, U.S.
- Resting place: Hamilton Cemetery; St. Joseph County, Indiana, U.S.
- Party: Whig; Republican
- Spouse: Clara Egbert (m. 1844; died 1856)
- Children: 5
- Occupation: Politician; businessman; banker

John Reynolds (July 12, 1814 – March 30, 1890) was a politician from Indiana. He served in the Indiana House of Representatives from 1850 to 1851 and in 1867. He served in the Indiana Senate in 1862.

== Early life ==
John Reynolds was born on July 12, 1814, near Lancaster, Ohio. His family attempted to move to Missouri but were pushed out by Native Americans. He worked on a farm near Fort Wayne, Indiana. Reynolds was hired as a foreman on the Wabash and Erie Canal. In 1833, the family moved to Rolling Prairie, Indiana. Reynolds took up a contract in South Bend, Indiana, to build Michigan Road. He then made plow irons in La Porte, Indiana, for three years.

== Career ==
Reynolds moved to Illinois and took a land claim. He lived there for three months before returning to Rolling Prairie. Reynolds took a construction contract with the Lake Shore and Michigan Southern Railway. His partners left and Reynolds operated the portion they constructed as an individual enterprise for three years. He worked with his brothers George and Ethan in a mercantile business. Reynolds retired from the mercantile business and became engaged in banking and other financial enterprises until 1860. In 1860, he was noted as the wealthiest man in Indiana.

Reynolds was a Whig and later became a Republican. From 1850 to 1851 and in 1867, Reynolds served in the Indiana House of Representatives. Reynolds was elected to the Indiana Senate in 1862, after the resignation of John F. Miller. Reynolds served as a delegate at the 1864 National Union National Convention and a presidential elector at the 1884 Republican National Convention. He also served as a member of the Constitutional Convention.

In 1861, at the outbreak of the American Civil War, Reynolds sent two substitutes in his stead. Reynolds owned a controlling interest in the First National Bank of South Bend and the First National Bank of Michigan City. He was president of Buchanan's Bank in Michigan and a large stockholder of Union National Bank of Chicago. He was a millionaire.

== Personal life ==
Reynolds married Clara Egbert in 1844. They had five children. His wife died in 1856. Reynolds was friends with Governor Oliver P. Morton.

Reynolds died from a gastric ulcer on March 30, 1890, in Terre Coupee Prairie in St. Joseph County, Indiana. He was buried at the Hamilton Cemetery in St. Joseph County.
