= John Reynolds (epigrammatist) =

English epigrammatist

- Born: 1584; Toddington, Bedfordshire, England
- Died: 1614 (aged 29–30)
- Occupation: Epigrammatist

John Reynolds (1584 – 1614), or John Reinolds, was an English epigrammatist.

== Biography ==
Reynolds was born at Toddington, Bedfordshire, in 1584. He was elected in 1597 to a scholarship at Winchester College. Afterward, he proceeded to New College, Oxford, where he matriculated on 12 February 1601–2. He was elected fellow in 1602, and graduated B.C.L. in 1607. He was esteemed ‘a good Grecian orator and poet,’ and projected a collection of a thousand Latin epigrams on kings, bishops, barons, doctors, knights, and the like, to be arranged in ten centuries. A very small part of the design was executed. A first instalment, consisting of 111 distiches on British kings and queens, appeared in 1611 with the title ‘Epigrammata Avctore Joanne Reinolds in LL. Baccalaureo Novi Collegij socio’ (Bodleian). A second part, dealing with bishops, was published, according to Wood, in 1612; but no copy seems known, and the scheme went no further. Reynolds contributed some Greek verses to a collection of poems by members of New College, to the memory of Ralph Warcop, entitled ‘Encomion Rodolphi Warcoppi,’ Oxford, 1605, and Bliss identifies him with the author of a pedestrian English poem, entitled ‘Dolarnys Primerose in the first part of the Passionate Hermit,’ 1606; Dolarnys is a transposition of ‘Raynolds’ (cf. Collier, Poet. Dec. ii. 15–17; Park, British Bibliographer, i. 153; Lowndes, Bibl. Manual, ed. Bohn). He died in 1614, and was buried in New College cloister.
