= Samuel Reynolds =

Samuel Reynolds or Sam Reynolds may refer to:

- Sam Reynolds (soccer) (born 1981), American soccer player
- Sam Reynolds (cyclist) (born 1991), English cyclist
- Samuel Reynolds (MP) (1642–1694), MP for Colchester
- Samuel William Reynolds (1773–1835), painter and engraver
- Samuel F. Reynolds (died 1877), Los Angeles City Attorney and judge
- Samuel Harvey Reynolds (1831–1897), divine and journalist
- Samuel W. Reynolds (1890–1988), U.S. senator

== See also ==
- Samuel Reynolds Hole, Dean of Rochester Cathedral
