= McReynolds =

McReynolds is a surname that refers to:

- Allen McReynolds (1877-1960), American politician, Missouri senator
- Andrew T. McReynolds (1808-1898), American military officer and lawyer
- Brandon McReynolds (born 1991), American stock car racing driver
- Brian McReynolds (born 1965), American ice hockey player
- Cliff McReynolds, American artist
- David McReynolds (1929-2018), American Socialist
- Faris McReynolds (born 1977), American artist and musician
- James Clark McReynolds (1862–1946), American judge, attorney general, and Supreme Court justice
- Jesse McReynolds (1929–2023), American bluegrass musician
- Jonathan McReynolds (born 1989), American gospel musician
- Kevin McReynolds (born. 1959), American professional baseball player
- Larry McReynolds (born 1959), American race car crew chief
- Madison McReynolds (born 1993), American actress
- Peter McReynolds, Northern Irish politician
- Sam D. McReynolds (1872–1939), American politician from Tennessee
- Thales McReynolds (1943-1988), American baseball player
- Tiffani McReynolds (born 1991), American hurdler
