= John Reynolds (Pennsylvania politician, born 1787) =

Newspaper editor and state legislator (1787–1853)

John Reynolds (March 30, 1787 – May 11, 1853) was an American businessman, newspaper editor, and politician. He served in the Pennsylvania state legislature for two terms, from 1822 to 1824. He was the editor of the Lancaster Journal newspaper before becoming a manager at Cornwall Ironworks. Among his sons were American Civil War general John F. Reynolds, killed at the Battle of Gettysburg, and admiral William Reynolds.
