= Joe Reynolds (baseball) =

American baseball player

- Pitcher

Negro league baseball debut
- 1935, for the Philadelphia Stars

Last appearance
- 1936, for the Bacharach Giants

Teams
- Philadelphia Stars (1935); Bacharach Giants (1936)

Joseph Reynolds is an American former Negro league pitcher who played in the 1930s.

Reynolds played for the Philadelphia Stars in 1935, and for the Bacharach Giants the following season. In five recorded appearances on the mound, he posted a 6.86 ERA over 21 innings.
