= Gerry Reynolds =

Gerry or Gerald Reynolds may refer to:

- Gerry Reynolds (broadcaster), Irish journalist, broadcaster and television producer
- Gerry Reynolds (British politician) (1927–1969), British Labour Party politician
- Gerry Reynolds (Irish politician) (born 1961), Irish Fine Gael politician
- Gerald A. Reynolds (born 1964), American politician and lawyer

== See also ==
- Jerry Reynolds (disambiguation)
