= Joseph Melvin Reynolds =

Joseph Melvin Reynolds (16 July 1924, Woodlawn, Tennessee – 11 June 1997, Baton Rouge, Louisiana) was an American professor of physics and a university administrator. He was a Guggenheim Fellow for the academic year 1958–1959.

== Biography ==
Reynolds attended David Lipscomb College (now Lipscomb University) from 1942 to 1944 and then transferred to Vanderbilt University, where he received a bachelor's degree in 1946. At Yale University he graduated with M.S. in 1947 and Ph.D. in physics in 1950. His thesis advisor was Cecil Taverner Lane (1904–1991). As a graduate student, Reynolds also taught for a year at Connecticut College. In the physics department of Louisiana State University (LSU), he was from 1950 to 1954 an assistant professor, from 1954 to 1958 an assistant professor, from 1958 to 1962 a full professor, and from 1962 to 1965 Boyd Professor. From 1962 to 1965 he was head of the department of physics and astronomy. At LSU he was promoted in 1965 to vice president of graduate studies and research development, in 1968 to vice president of instruction and research, and in 1981 to vice president for academic affairs, holding that position until 1985.

In 1957 Reynolds was elected a Fellow of the American Physical Society. As a Guggenheim Fellow, he spent the academic year 1958–1959 as a visiting professor at Leiden University's Kamerlingh-Onnes Laboratory. In 1966 he was elected a Fellow of the American Association for the Advancement of Science. He spent a sabbatical year from 1969 to 1970 as a visiting scholar at Stanford University. Using what he learned at Stanford, he helped to establish LSU's gravitational radiation detection program.

His experimental achievements included the first observation of Landau quantum oscillation (LQO) in the Hall effect (with Claude Grenier), the first direct measurement of the added mass due to the flow of the superfluid component of helium-4 (with Bill Good and Robert Hussey) and the detection of LQO in the Knight shift (with Roy Goodrich).

In addition to his academic responsibilities, Dr. Reynolds was a paid consultant for both governmental and private agencies, including NASA, the George C. Marshall Space Flight Center, Union Carbide Corporation, the Oak Ridge National Laboratory, Ethyl Corporation, and the National Science Board.

Reynolds helped to formulate U.S. space science policies and their implementations. He helped to initiate the space station's microgravity program and supported the Schiff-Everitt experiment.

Dr. Reynolds wed Ruth Anna Heise in 1950. They raised three children; Molly Elizabeth, John Shelby, and Wendy Lee. His personal affiliations included the Cosmos Club in Washington, D.C.; the Southern Yacht Club in New Orleans; and the United States Yacht Racing Union.

== Selected publications ==
- Grenier, C. G.; Reynolds, J. M.; Zebouni, N. H. (1963). "Electron Transport Phenomena in Zinc at Liquid-Helium Temperatures". Physical Review. 129 (3): 1088–1104. Bibcode:1963PhRv..129.1088G. doi:10.1103/PhysRev.129.1088.
- Hussey, R. G.; Good, B. J.; Reynolds, J. M. (1967). "Oscillation of Two Cylinders in Liquid Helium". Physics of Fluids. 10 (1): 89. Bibcode:1967PhFl...10...89H. doi:10.1063/1.1762000.
- Coon, Julian B.; Grenier, Claude G.; Reynolds, Joseph M. (1967). "Magnetoacoustic effect in thallium". Journal of Physics and Chemistry of Solids. 28 (2): 301–311. Bibcode:1967JPCS...28..301C. doi:10.1016/0022-3697(67)90125-4.
- Khan, H. R.; Reynolds, J. M.; Goodrich, R. G. (1970). "Magnetic Field Dependence of the Knight Shift in Aluminum". Physical Review B. 2 (12): 4796–4800. Bibcode:1970PhRvB...2.4796K. doi:10.1103/PhysRevB.2.4796. ISSN 0556-2805.
