= James Reynolds (cricketer) =

English cricketer

James Reynolds (2 May 1866 — 6 September 1950) was an English cricketer. He was a right-handed batsman and a right-arm medium-pace bowler. He was born in Tonbridge and died in Malling Place.

Reynolds' debut came in 1890, the inaugural County Championship season, in an innings victory for Kent. Reynolds' next cricketing appearance came in a Gentlemen v Players match in 1892.

Reynolds' second and final first-class match came seven years after his first, in a drawn two-day game in which there was no play on the second day.

== Bibliography ==
- Carlaw, Derek (2020). Kent County Cricketers, A to Z: Part One (1806–1914) (PDF). Cardiff: ACS.
