= John Reynolds (neuroscientist) =

American neuroscientist

- Organization: Salk Institute for Biological Studies
- Known for: Neuroscience research
- Title: Professor
- Awards: American Association for the Advancement of Science Fellow

John Reynolds is an American neuroscientist. He is a professor at the Salk Institute for Biological Studies, adjunct professor at University of California, San Diego, and member of the advisory board for the Kavli Foundation (United States) Kavli Institute for the Brain and Mind. He studies perception and vision and is known for developing a computational model of attention that scientists use as a framework for understanding how the brain performs attentional selection.

== Education ==
John Reynolds received his bachelor's of science in economics from the University of Pennsylvania, and then completed his doctoral studies in cognitive and neural systems at Boston University. He then joined the National Institute of Mental Health as an Intramural Research Fellow in their Laboratory of Neuropsychology.

== Career and research ==
After his fellowship at the National Institute of Mental Health, John Reynolds joined the Salk Institute for Biological Studies as an assistant professor in the Systems Neurobiology Laboratory in 2000.

Currently, John Reynolds runs a lab at the Salk Institute for Biological Studies, where he works on developing models of the visual system, perception, and consciousness. In his time at the Institute, he has made several landmark discoveries in his field:

- In 2004, he published a paper in Annual Review of Neuroscience describing how the brain attends to a specific stimuli by increasing its contrast against its surroundings.
- In 2009, he published a paper in Neuron (journal) describing a model for studying attentional selection in the brain, which was dubbed the "normalization model of attention."
- In 2013, he published again in Neuron (journal) to reveal how neurons in the visual areas of the brain are highly dynamic, which allows the brain to predict the movement of stimuli.
- In 2020, he published a paper in Nature (journal) finding perception relies on traveling brain waves.

John Reynolds' more recent work focuses on aging and Alzheimer's disease, like his 2023 study detailing how the failure of mitochondria to produce sufficient energy in brain synapses may cause age-related cognitive decline. He is also working on new tools for studying neurons with Mark Schnitzer at Stanford University and looking more at the aging brain with Salk Institute for Biological Studies colleague Fred Gage.

John Reynolds has also participated in artistic collaborations, including serving on the board of the non-profit art project A SHIP IN THE WOODS and supporting David Byrne's immersive optical illusion show "Theater of the Mind."

== Awards and honors ==
- 2022 American Association for the Advancement of Science Fellow
- 2001 McKnight Foundation Scholar Award
