= Dick Reynolds (politician) =

American politician

Richard Floyd Reynolds (September 21, 1927 – February 17, 2014) was an American politician.

== Life ==
Born in Flint, Ohio, Reynolds served in the United States Army. Reynolds moved to Richardson, Texas in 1960. He served on the Richardson City Council. Reynolds then served in the Texas House of Representatives, as a Republican, from 1974 to 1977.

== Death ==
Reynolds died in Fort Worth, Texas. He is buried at Texas State Cemetery, Section:Patriots' Hill, Section 2 (A) Row:F Number:6. He was preceded in death by a son, Christopher. He is survived by his wife, Donna Reynolds; six children, Brad Reynolds of Austin, Guy Reynolds of Dallas, Jack Reynolds of Frisco, Eric Reynolds of Mansfield, Ann Marie of Boulder, Colo., and Holly Job of Stephenville; 11 grandchildren; brother, Jack Reynolds of Canal Winchester, Ohio; and sister, Marilyn Lawless Worthington, Ohio.
