= Christopher Reynolds (politician) =

American politician (1611–1654)

Member of Virginia House of Burgesses for one session only
- In office 1652–1652

Personal details
- Born: 1611 England
- Died: 1654 (aged 42–43) Virginia
- Spouse: Elizabeth
- Children: Christopher; John; Richard; Abbasha; Elizabeth (stepdaughter?); Jane; George Rivers (stepson); Thomas, born after the Will was written.
- Occupation: farmer

Christopher Reynolds was not a politician but was sent as a member of the Virginia House of Burgesses for one session to rebuke in the late 1652 session the alleged excesses of his predecessor, which Reynolds did.

He was an ancestor of R. J. Reynolds. Other notable descendants include Samuel Langhorne Clemens “Mark Twain” and "Lonesome" Charley Reynolds.

== Early life ==
Christopher Reynolds was born in Gravesend, England in 1611, the son of George Reynolds and Thomasyn Church.

He arrived in the Virginia Colony along with several family members, including his brother Thomas, in 1622 aboard the John & Francis. As his party arrived very shortly after the Massacre of 1622, they first lived in Jamestowne, but eventually went across the James River as originally planned to settle as indentured servants in Warrascoyack County, Virginia, later named Isle of Wight County.

Eleven years old when he arrived in Jamestowne, he was an indentured servant of Edward Bennett's Plantation, where he was still living in 1625. In 1626 he was documented in a legal dispute concerning the contract of other servants on the Bennett plantation.

Although there are many references to the information above, there are many who question the parents of Christopher being George and Thomasyn. After much research, the Reynolds Family Association does not accept this as fact. There are two very well written and referenced articles to be found at: https://web.archive.org/web/20120103062202/http://www.reynoldsfamily.org/line17/chris_4.html and http://www.genfiles.com/reynolds/Reynoldschron1622-1699.htm that cast serious doubt on the accuracy of the conclusions of the writers of the sources quoted for this information. [Whether the “Reynolds Family Association” should be ascribed any authority at all remains to be proved, as its existence is novel at best. It might also be pointed out that this is the organization that created and endorsed the spurious three-fox "coat of arms" still foisted on the public.-—Douglas W. Reynolds, Jr.]

== Late life ==
By 1636, he had settled on 450 acres (180 ha) in what eventually became Isle of Wight County near Pagan Creek. He had married Elizabeth, a widow with two children. They raised seven children, several who were mentioned in his will in 1654: son Christopher, son John, son Richard, daughter Abbasha, daughter Elizabeth, daughter Jane, stepson George Rivers, unnamed (unborn son Thomas, born 1655).

=== Representative ===
In 1652, he was elected to the Virginia House of Burgesses.
