= Mark Reynolds (basketball) =

Irish basketball player

Mark Michael Reynolds (born January 11, 1984) is an Irish professional basketball player playing for the Proveo Merlins of Crailsheim, Germany. The 6'6 forward, from Longford, Reynolds played his underage basketball with the Longford Falcons. He attended the University of Aberdeen and represented Scotland in the BUSA Universities tournament in 2005–2007. The Scottish Universities select team won the BUSA basketball tournament in 2007 defeating England in the final, a feat not accomplished in decades. Reynolds received his first Irish Senior Men's international cap against Luxembourg on 27 July 2007. He received the MVP award at the BUCS 2012 championship.
