= John F. Reynolds =

Career officer of the United States Army

John Reynolds
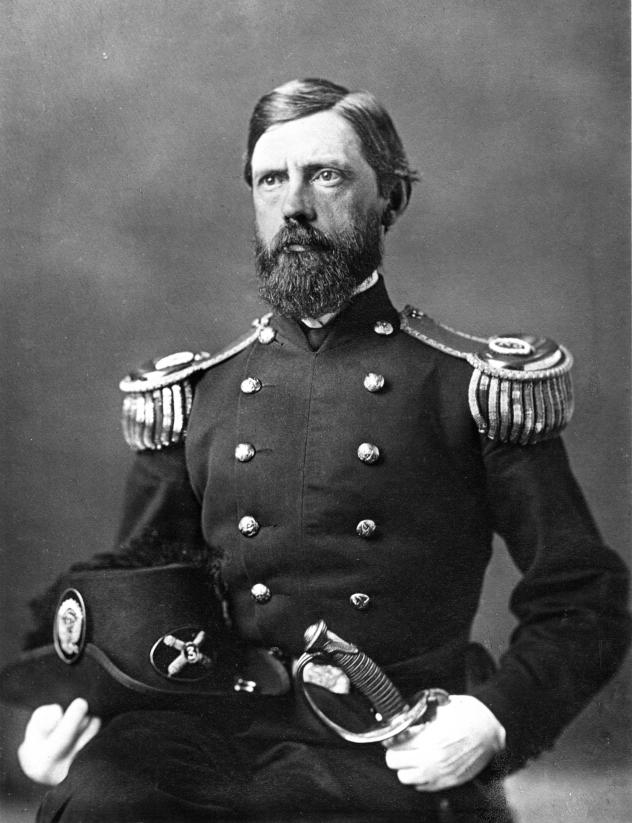
- Born: September 20, 1820; Lancaster, Pennsylvania
- Died: July 1, 1863 (aged 42); Gettysburg, Pennsylvania
- Burial place: Lancaster Cemetery, Lancaster, Pennsylvania
- Military career
- Allegiance: United States
- Branch: United States Army (Union Army)
- Service years: 1841–1863
- Rank: Major general
- Commands: I Corps, Army of the Potomac
- Conflicts: Mexican–American War; Battle of Monterrey; Battle of Buena Vista; Rogue River Wars; American Civil War; Seven Days Battles; Second Battle of Bull Run; Battle of Fredericksburg; Battle of Chancellorsville; Battle of Gettysburg †

John Fulton Reynolds (September 20, 1820 – July 1, 1863) was a career United States Army officer and a general in the American Civil War. One of the Union Army's most respected senior commanders, he played a key role in committing the Army of the Potomac to the Battle of Gettysburg and was killed at the start of the battle.

== Early life and career ==
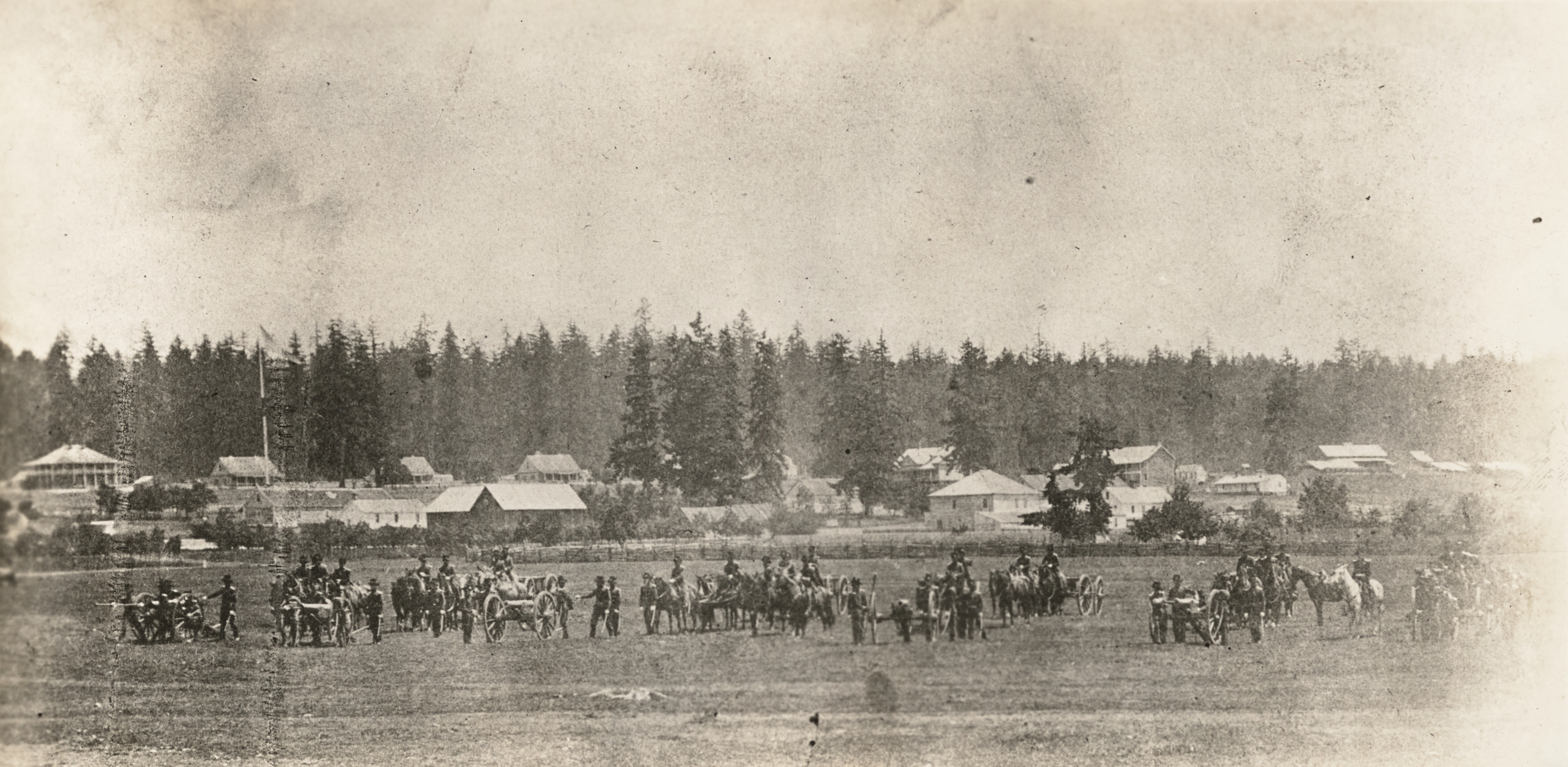
Reynolds' battery assembled at Fort Vancouver c. 1860

Reynolds was born in Lancaster, Pennsylvania, one of nine surviving children of John Reynolds (1787–1853) and Lydia Moore Reynolds (1794–1843). Two of his brothers were James LeFevre Reynolds, Quartermaster General of Pennsylvania, and Rear Admiral William Reynolds. Prior to his military training, Reynolds studied in nearby Lititz, about 6 miles (9.7 km) from his home in Lancaster. Next he attended a school in Long Green, Maryland, and finally the Lancaster County Academy.

Reynolds was nominated to the United States Military Academy in 1837 by Senator James Buchanan, a family friend, and graduated 26th of 50 cadets in the class of 1841. He was commissioned a brevet second lieutenant in the 3rd U.S. Artillery, assigned to Fort McHenry. From 1842 to 1845 he was assigned to St. Augustine, Florida, and Fort Moultrie, South Carolina, before joining Zachary Taylor's army at Corpus Christi, Texas, for the Mexican–American War. He was awarded two brevet promotions in Mexico – to captain for gallantry at Monterrey and to major for Buena Vista, where his section of guns prevented the Mexican cavalry from outflanking the American left. During the war, he became friends with fellow officers Winfield Scott Hancock and Lewis A. Armistead.

On his return from Mexico, Reynolds was assigned to Fort Preble, Maine; New Orleans, Louisiana; and Fort Lafayette, New York. He was next sent west to Fort Orford, Oregon, in 1855, and participated in the Rogue River Wars of 1856 and the Utah War with the Mormons in 1857–58. He was the Commandant of Cadets at West Point from September 1860 to June 1861, while also serving as an instructor of artillery, cavalry, and infantry tactics. During his return from the West, Reynolds became engaged to Katherine May Hewitt. Since they were from different religious denominations – Reynolds was a Protestant, Hewitt a Catholic – the engagement was kept a secret and Hewitt's parents did not learn about it until after Reynolds' death.

== Civil War ==
=== Early assignments and the Seven Days ===
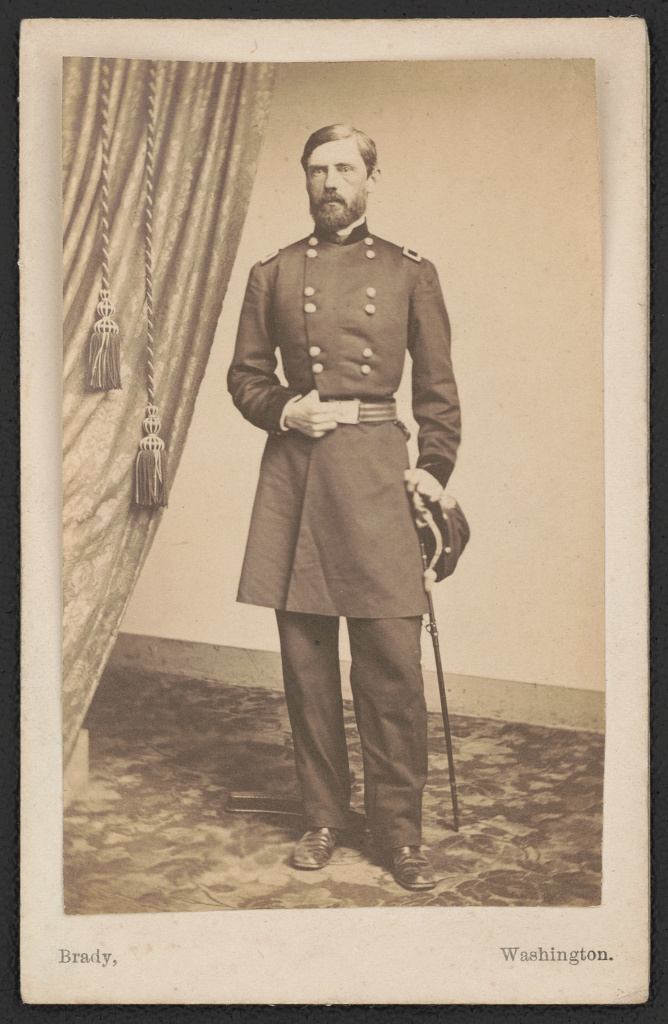
Major General John Fulton Reynolds. From the Liljenquist Family Collection of Civil War Photographs, Prints and Photographs Division, Library of Congress

Soon after the start of the Civil War, Reynolds was offered the position as aide-de-camp to Lt. Gen. Winfield Scott, but declined. He was appointed lieutenant colonel of the 14th U.S. Infantry, but before he could engage with that unit, he was promoted to brigadier general on August 20, 1861, and ordered to report to Washington, D.C. While in transit, his orders were changed to report to Cape Hatteras Inlet, North Carolina. Maj. Gen. George B. McClellan intervened with the Secretary of War to get his orders changed once again, assigning him to the newly formed Army of the Potomac. His first assignment was with a board that examined the qualifications of volunteer officers, but he soon was given command of a brigade of Pennsylvania Reserves.

As McClellan's army moved up the Virginia Peninsula in the 1862 Peninsula Campaign, Reynolds occupied and became military governor of Fredericksburg, Virginia. His brigade was then ordered to join the V Corps at Mechanicsville, just before the start of the Seven Days Battles. The brigade was hit hard by the Confederate attack of June 26 at the Battle of Beaver Dam Creek, but their defensive line held and Reynolds later received a letter of commendation from his division commander, Brig. Gen. George A. McCall.

The Confederate attack continued on June 27 and Reynolds, exhausted from the Battle of Gaines' Mill and two days without sleep, was captured in Boatswain's Swamp, Virginia. Thinking he was in a place of relative safety, he fell asleep and was not aware that his retreating troops left him behind. He was extremely embarrassed when brought before the Confederate general of the capturing troops; D.H. Hill was an Army friend and colleague from before the war. Hill allegedly told him, "Reynolds, do not feel so bad about your capture, it is the fate of wars." Reynolds was transported to Richmond and held at Libby Prison, but was quickly exchanged on August 15 (for Lloyd Tilghman).

=== Second Bull Run, Fredericksburg, and Chancellorsville ===
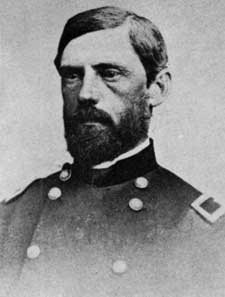
Reynolds c. 1863

Upon his return, Reynolds was given command of the Pennsylvania Reserves Division, whose commander, George A. McCall, had been captured just two days after Reynolds. The V Corps joined the Army of Virginia, under Maj. Gen. John Pope, at Manassas. On the second day of the Second Battle of Bull Run, while most of the Union Army was retreating, Reynolds led his men in a last-ditch stand on Henry House Hill, site of the great Union debacle at First Bull Run the previous year. Waving the flag of the 2nd Reserves regiment, he yelled, "Now boys, give them the steel, charge bayonets, double quick!" His counterattack halted the Confederate advance long enough to give the Union Army time to retreat in a more orderly fashion, arguably the most important factor in preventing its complete destruction.

At the request of Pennsylvania Governor Andrew G. Curtin, Reynolds was given command of the Pennsylvania Militia during General Robert E. Lee's invasion of Maryland. Generals McClellan and Joseph Hooker complained that "a scared governor ought not to be permitted to destroy the usefulness of an entire division," but the governor prevailed and Reynolds spent two weeks in Pennsylvania drilling old men and boys, missing the Battle of Antietam. However, he returned to the Army of the Potomac in late 1862 and assumed command of the I Corps. One of his divisions, commanded by Maj. Gen. George G. Meade, made the only breakthrough at the Battle of Fredericksburg, but Reynolds did not reinforce Meade with his other two divisions and the attack failed; Reynolds did not receive a clear understanding from Maj. Gen. William B. Franklin about his role in the attack. Before the battle, Reynolds was promoted to major general of volunteers, with a date of rank of November 29, 1862.

At the Battle of Chancellorsville in May 1863, Reynolds clashed with Maj. Gen. Hooker, his predecessor at I Corps, but by this time the commander of the Army of the Potomac. Hooker originally placed the I Corps on the extreme left of the Union line, southeast of Fredericksburg, hoping to threaten and distract the Confederate right. On May 2, Hooker changed his mind and ordered the corps to conduct a daylight march nearly 20 miles to swing around and become the extreme right flank of the army, to the northwest of the XI Corps. The march was delayed by faulty communications and by the need to move stealthily to avoid Confederate contact. Thus, the I Corps was not yet in position when the XI Corps was surprised and overrun by Lt. Gen. Thomas J. "Stonewall" Jackson's flank attack, a setback that destroyed Hooker's nerve for offensive action. Hooker called a council of war on May 4 in which Reynolds voted to proceed with the battle, but although the vote was three to two for offensive action, Hooker decided to retreat. Reynolds, who had gone to sleep after giving his proxy vote to Meade, woke up and muttered loud enough for Hooker to hear, "What was the use of calling us together at this time of night when he intended to retreat anyhow?" The 17,000-man I Corps was not engaged at Chancellorsville and suffered only 300 casualties during the entire campaign.

Reynolds joined several of his fellow officers in urging that Hooker be replaced, in the same way he had spoken out against Maj. Gen. Ambrose Burnside after Fredericksburg. On the previous occasion, Reynolds wrote in a private letter, "If we do not get some one soon who can command an army without consulting 'Stanton and Halleck' at Washington, I do not know what will become of this Army." President Abraham Lincoln met with Reynolds in a private interview on June 2 and is believed to have asked him whether he would consider being the next commander of the Army of the Potomac. Reynolds supposedly replied that he would be willing to accept only if he were given a free hand and could be isolated from the political influences that had affected the Army commanders throughout the war. Unable to comply with his demands, Lincoln promoted the more junior George G. Meade to replace Hooker on June 28.

=== Gettysburg ===
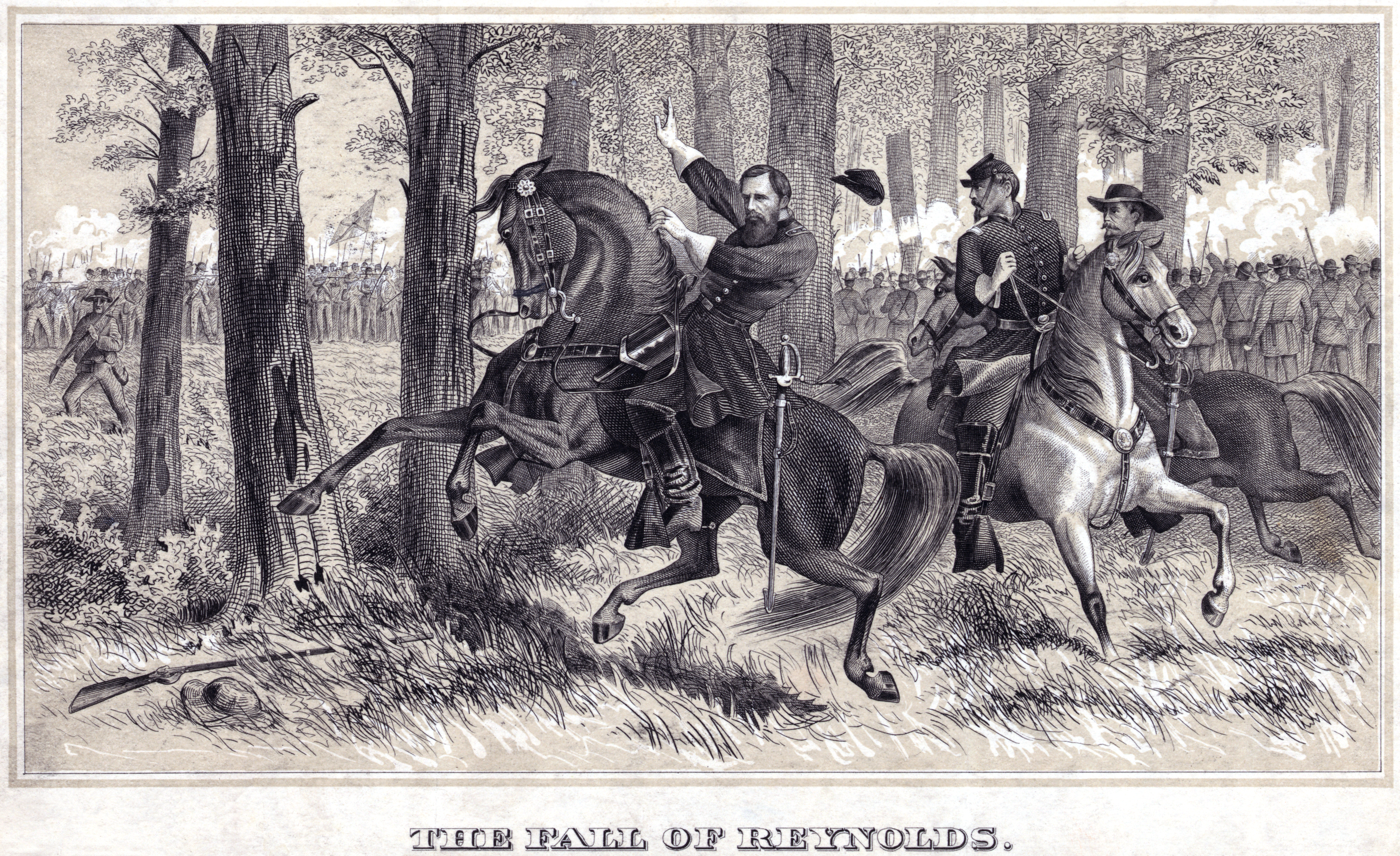
"The Fall of Reynolds" – illustration of Reynolds' death at Gettysburg, by Alfred Waud

On the morning of July 1, 1863, Reynolds was commanding the "left wing" of the Army of the Potomac, with operational control over the I, III, and XI Corps, and Brig. Gen. John Buford's cavalry division. Buford occupied the town of Gettysburg, Pennsylvania, and set up light defensive lines north and west of the town. He resisted the approach of two Confederate infantry brigades on the Chambersburg Pike until the nearest Union infantry, Reynolds' I Corps, began to arrive. Reynolds rode out ahead of the 1st Division, met with Buford, and then accompanied some of his soldiers, probably from Brig. Gen. Lysander Cutler's brigade, into the fighting at Herbst's Woods. Troops began arriving from Brig. Gen. Solomon Meredith's Iron Brigade, and as Reynolds was supervising the placement of the 2nd Wisconsin, he yelled at them, "Forward men forward for God's sake and drive those fellows out of those woods." At that moment he fell from his horse with a wound in the back of the upper neck, or lower head, and died almost instantly. Command passed to his senior division commander, Maj. Gen. Abner Doubleday.

For the Union side, the death of John Reynolds meant more than the loss of an inspiring leader; it also removed from the equation the one person with enough vision and sense of purpose to manage this battle.

— Noah Andre Trudeau, Gettysburg: A Testing of Courage

The loss of General Reynolds was keenly felt by the army. He was loved by his men and respected by his peers. There are no recorded instances of negative comments made by his contemporaries. Historian Shelby Foote wrote that many considered him "not only the highest ranking but also the best general in the army." His death had a more immediate effect that day, however. By ratifying Buford's defensive plan and engaging his I Corps infantry, Reynolds essentially selected the location for the Battle of Gettysburg for Meade, turning a chance meeting engagement into a massive pitched battle, committing the Army of the Potomac to fight on that ground with forces that were initially numerically inferior to the Confederates that were concentrating there. In the command confusion that followed Reynolds' death, the two Union corps that reached the field were overwhelmed and forced to retreat through the streets of Gettysburg to the high ground south of town, where they were rallied by his old friend, Maj. Gen. Winfield S. Hancock.

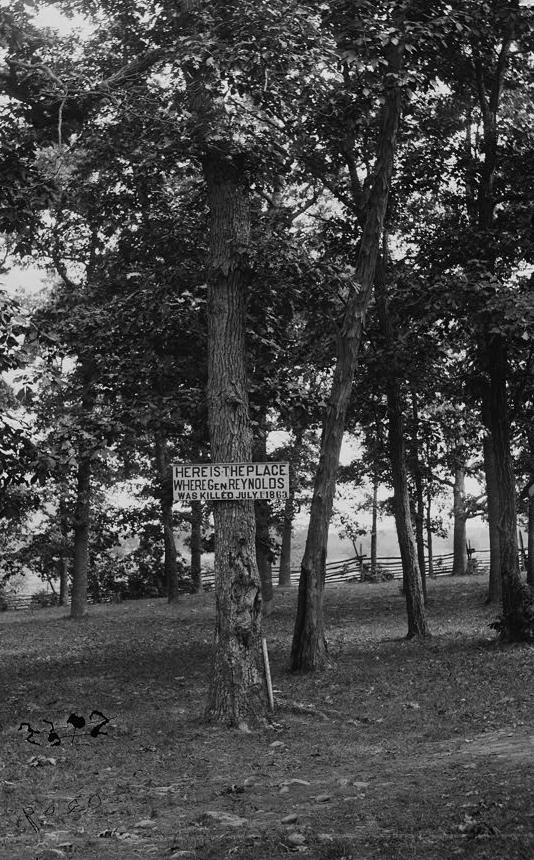
Possible location of General Reynolds' death

Reynolds' body was immediately transported from Gettysburg to Taneytown, Maryland, and then to his birthplace, Lancaster, Pennsylvania, where he was buried on July 4, 1863. Befitting his importance to the Union and his native state, he is memorialized by three statues in Gettysburg National Military Park (an equestrian statue on McPherson Ridge, one by John Quincy Adams Ward in the National Cemetery, and one on the Pennsylvania Memorial), as well as one in front of the Philadelphia City Hall. Katherine Hewitt had agreed with Reynolds that if he were killed in the war and they could not marry, she would join a convent. After he was buried, she traveled to Emmitsburg, Maryland, and joined the St. Joseph Central House of the Order of the Daughters of Charity.

=== Death controversies ===
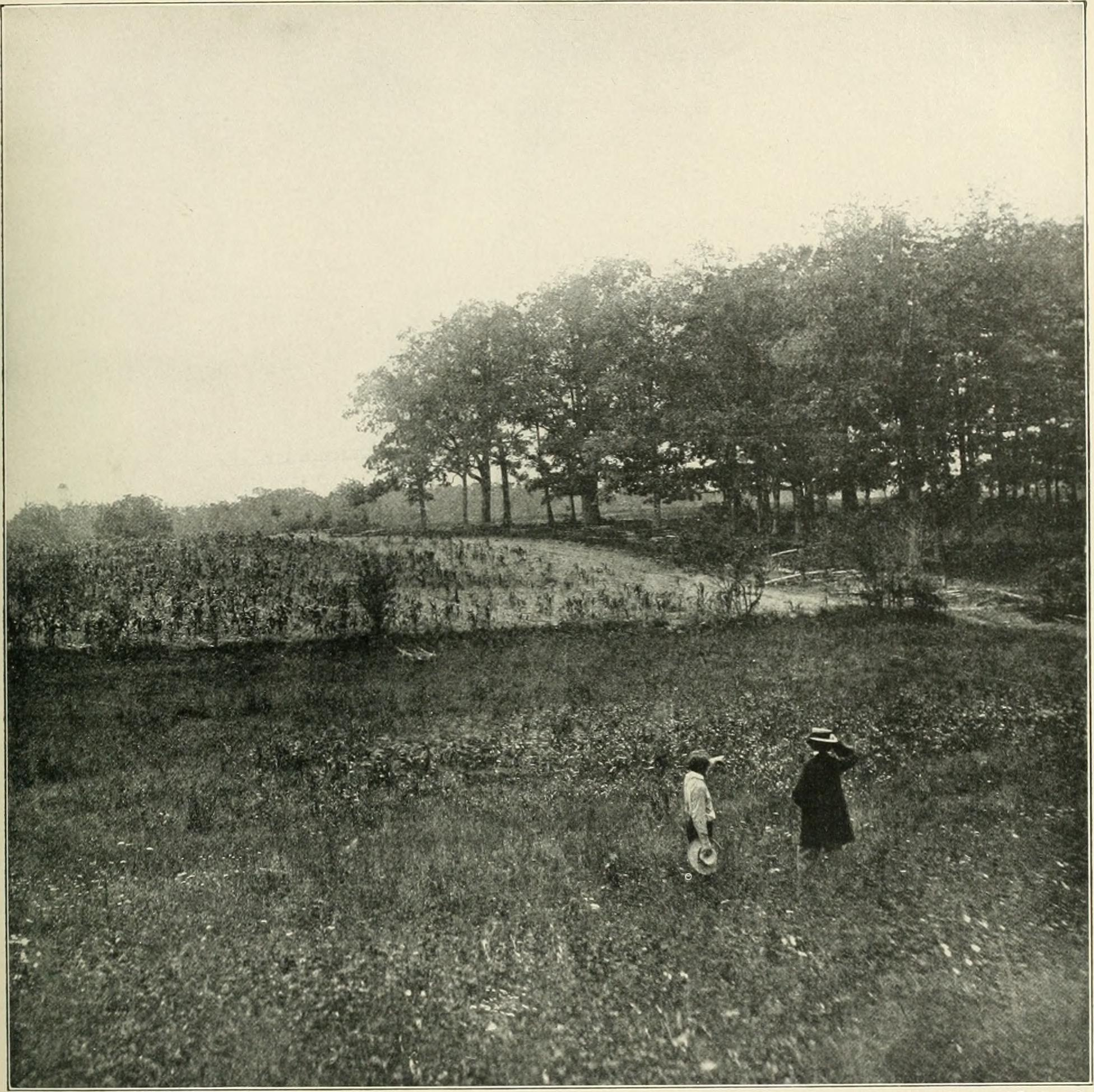
"Where Reynolds Fell," (from The Photographic History of the Civil War)

Historians disagree on the details of Reynolds' death, including the specific time (either 10:15 a.m. or 10:40–10:50 a.m.), the exact location (on East McPherson Ridge, near the 2nd Wisconsin Infantry, or West McPherson Ridge, near the 19th Indiana), and the source of the bullet (a Confederate infantryman, a Confederate sharpshooter, or friendly fire). One primary source was Sergeant Charles Henry Veil, his orderly and unit Color Guard, who described the events in a letter in 1864 and then contradicted some of the details in another letter 45 years later. A letter from Reynolds' sister, Jennie, stated that the wound had a downward trajectory from the neck, implying that he was shot from above, presumably a sharpshooter in a tree or barn. Historians Bruce Catton and Glenn Tucker make firm assertions that a sharpshooter was responsible; Stephen Sears credits volley fire from the 7th Tennessee against the 2nd Wisconsin; Edwin Coddington cites the sister's letter and finds the sharpshooter theory to be partly credible, but leans towards Sears' conclusion; Harry W. Pfanz agrees that the location was behind the 2nd Wisconsin, but makes no judgment about the source of the fire. Steve Sanders, writing in Gettysburg magazine, suggested the possibility of friendly fire based on some accounts, and concludes that it is as equally likely as enemy fire.

== Legacy ==
John F. Reynolds Middle School in the School District of Lancaster (PA) is named in his honor. Reynolds plays a role in Michael Shaara's 1974 Pulitzer Prize winning novel The Killer Angels, as well as the 1993 film based on that novel, Gettysburg (in which he was played by John Rothman). The film portrays Reynolds as being deliberately targeted by a Confederate sharpshooter, a scene based on the Don Troiani painting of the event. Reynolds is also significant in the prequel to The Killer Angels, Jeffrey Shaara's novel Gods and Generals, although his role was deleted from the 2003 film based on the novel.

== Monuments and memorials ==
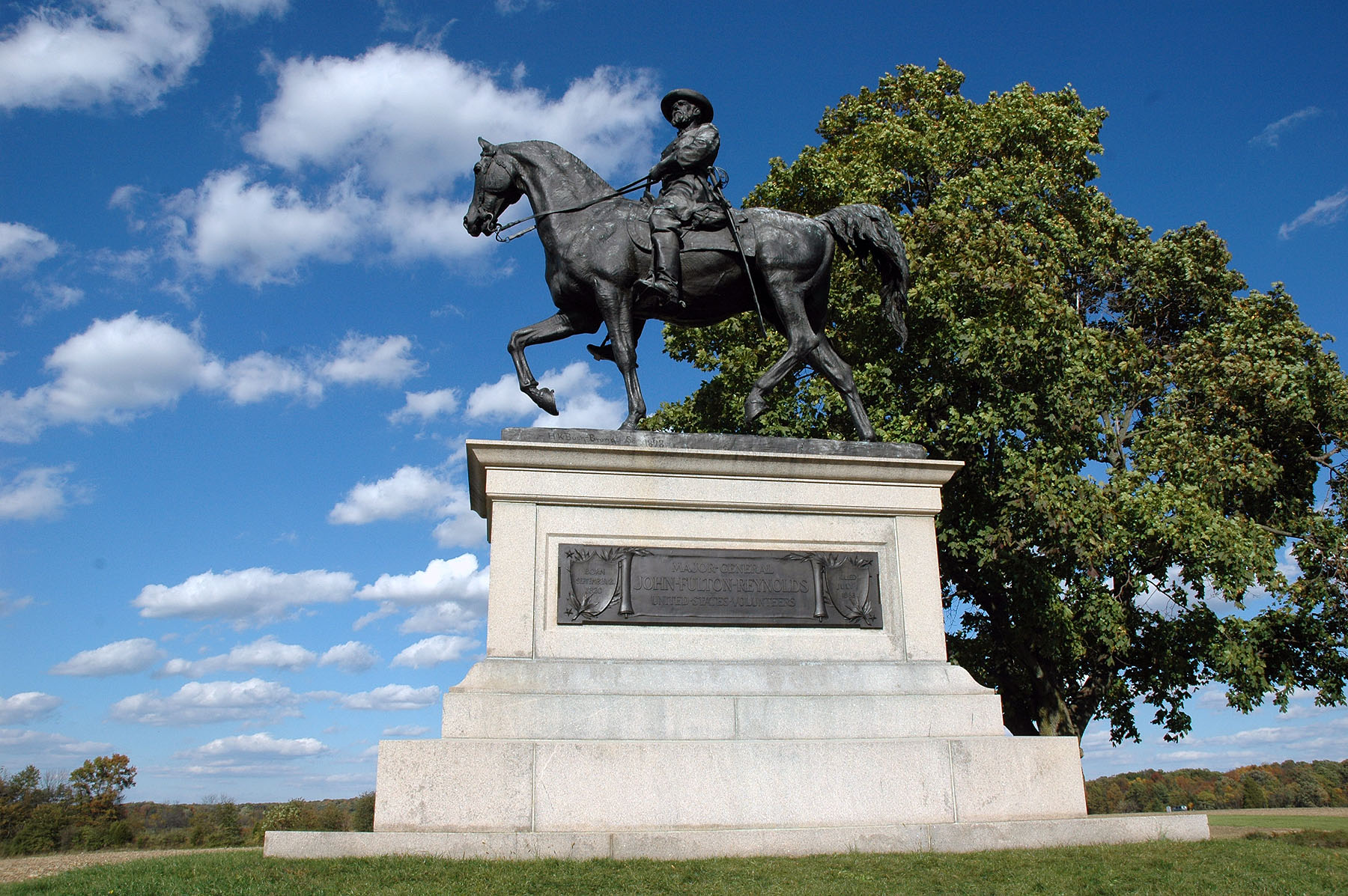
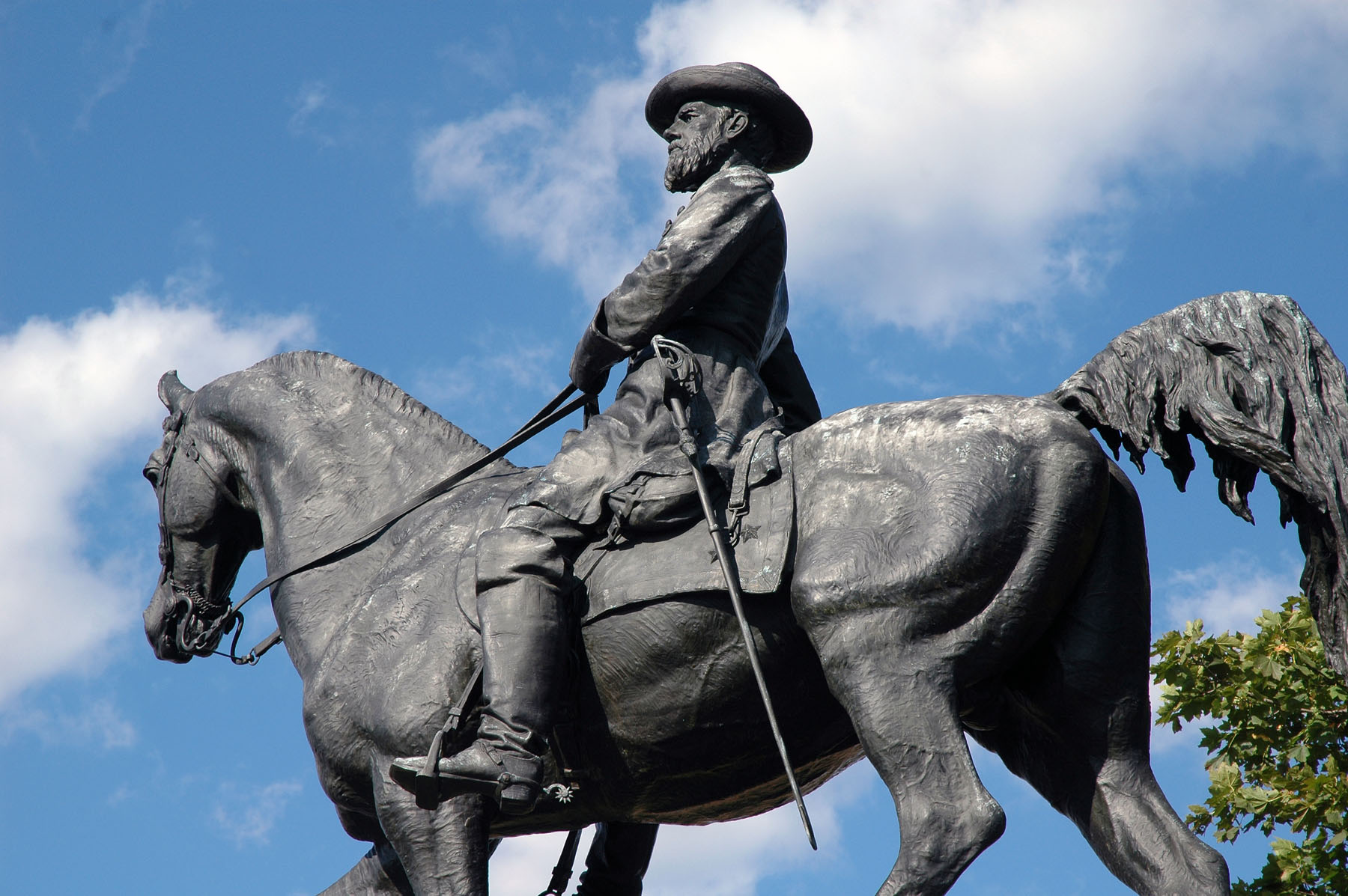
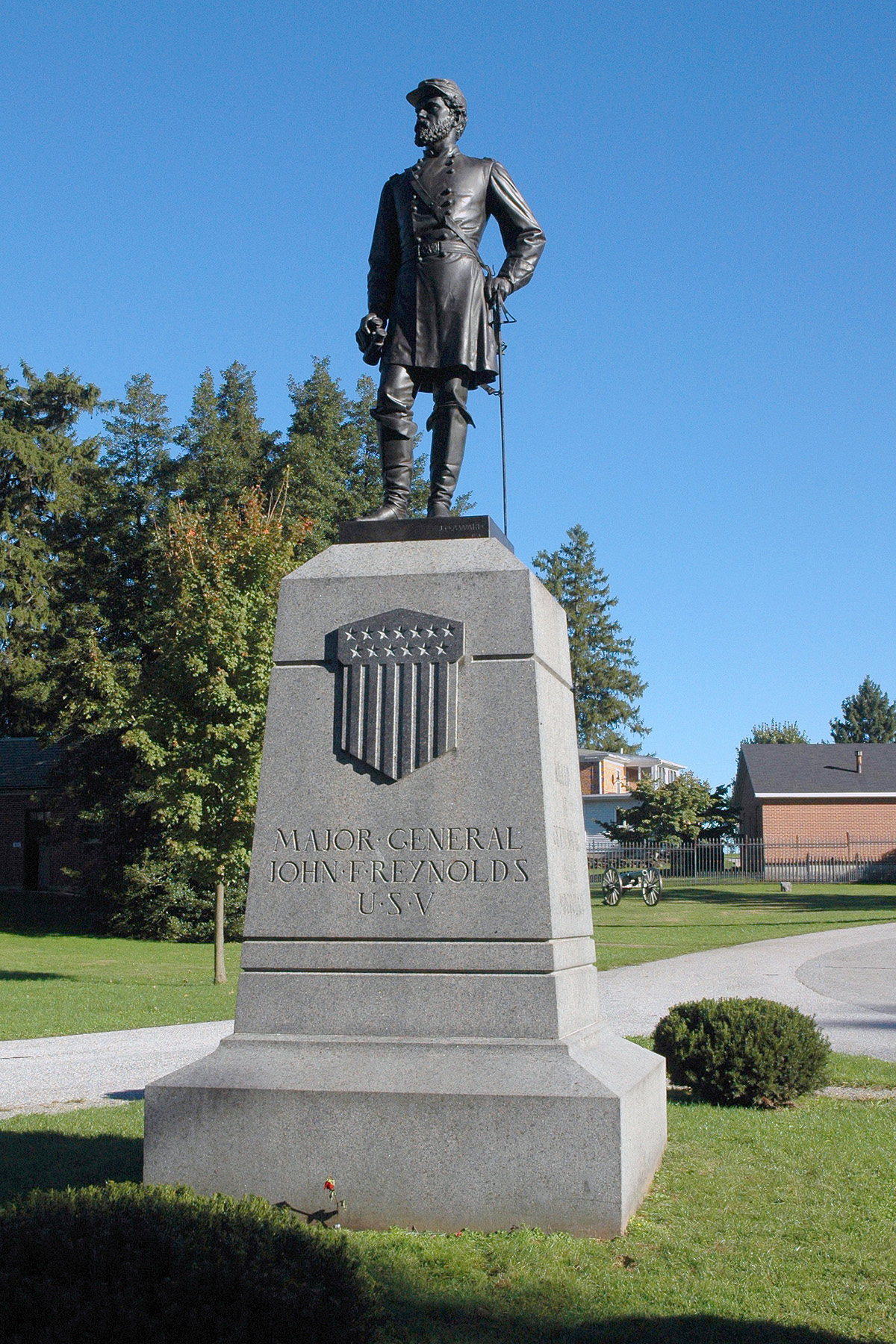
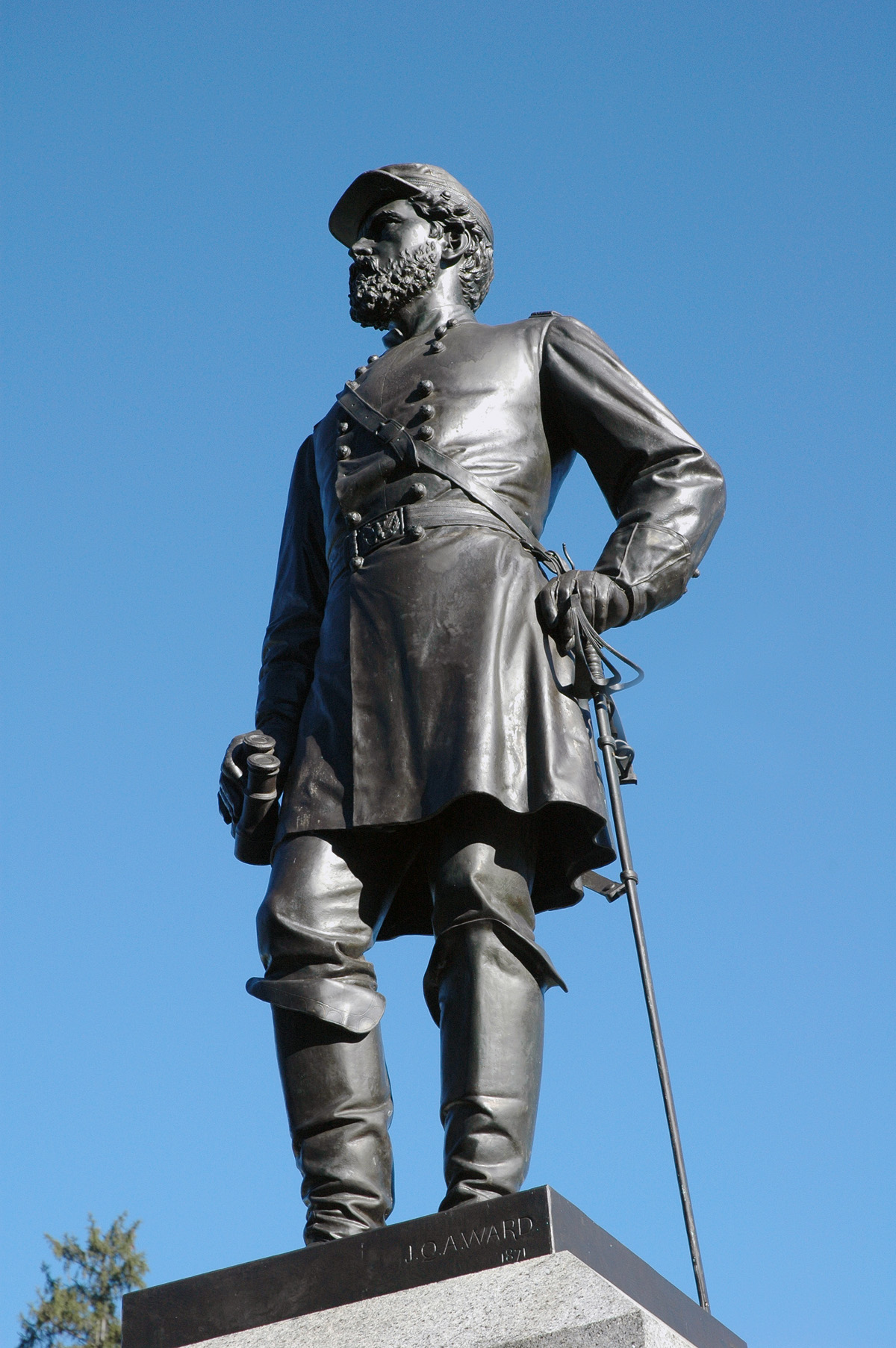
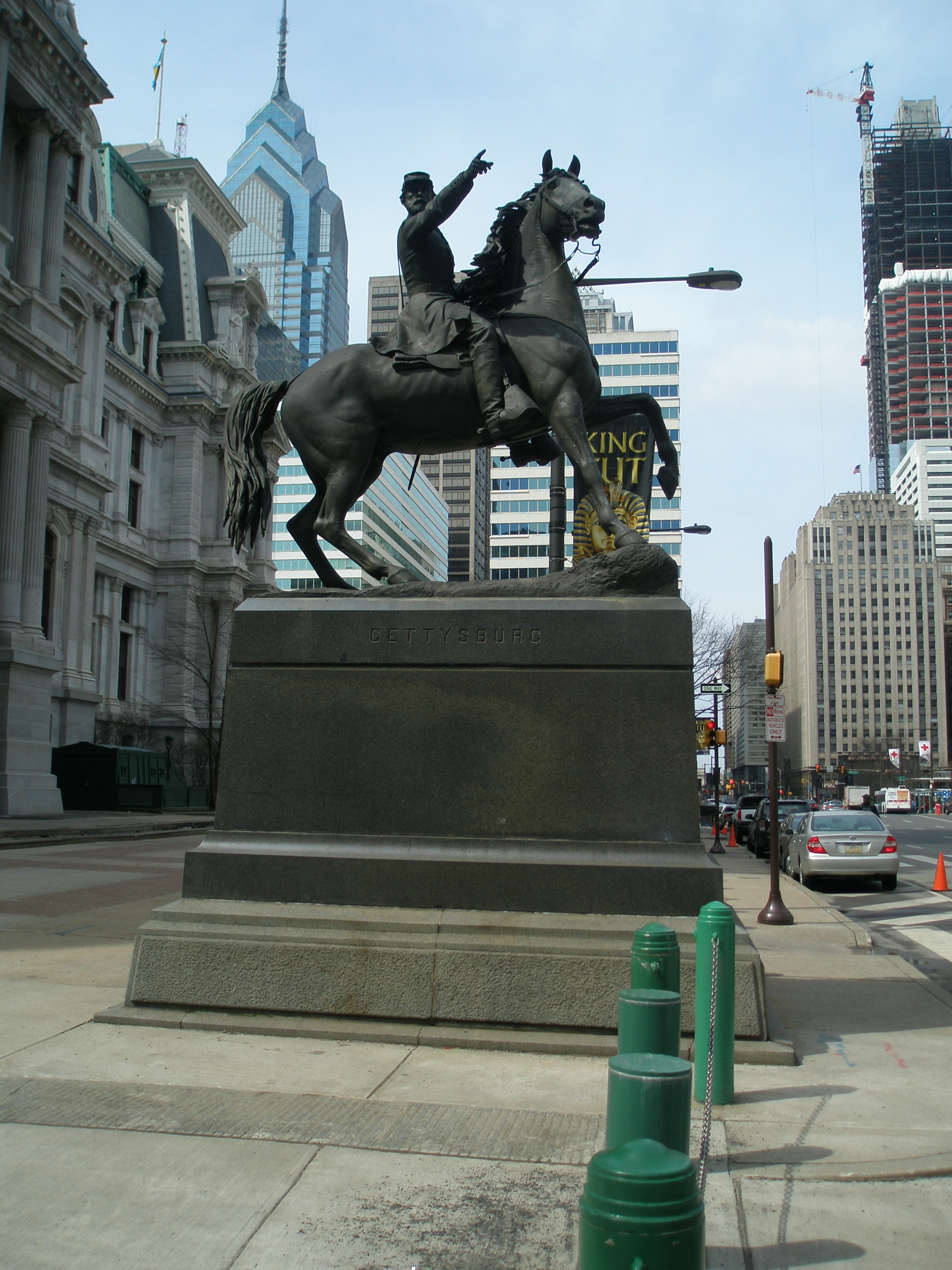
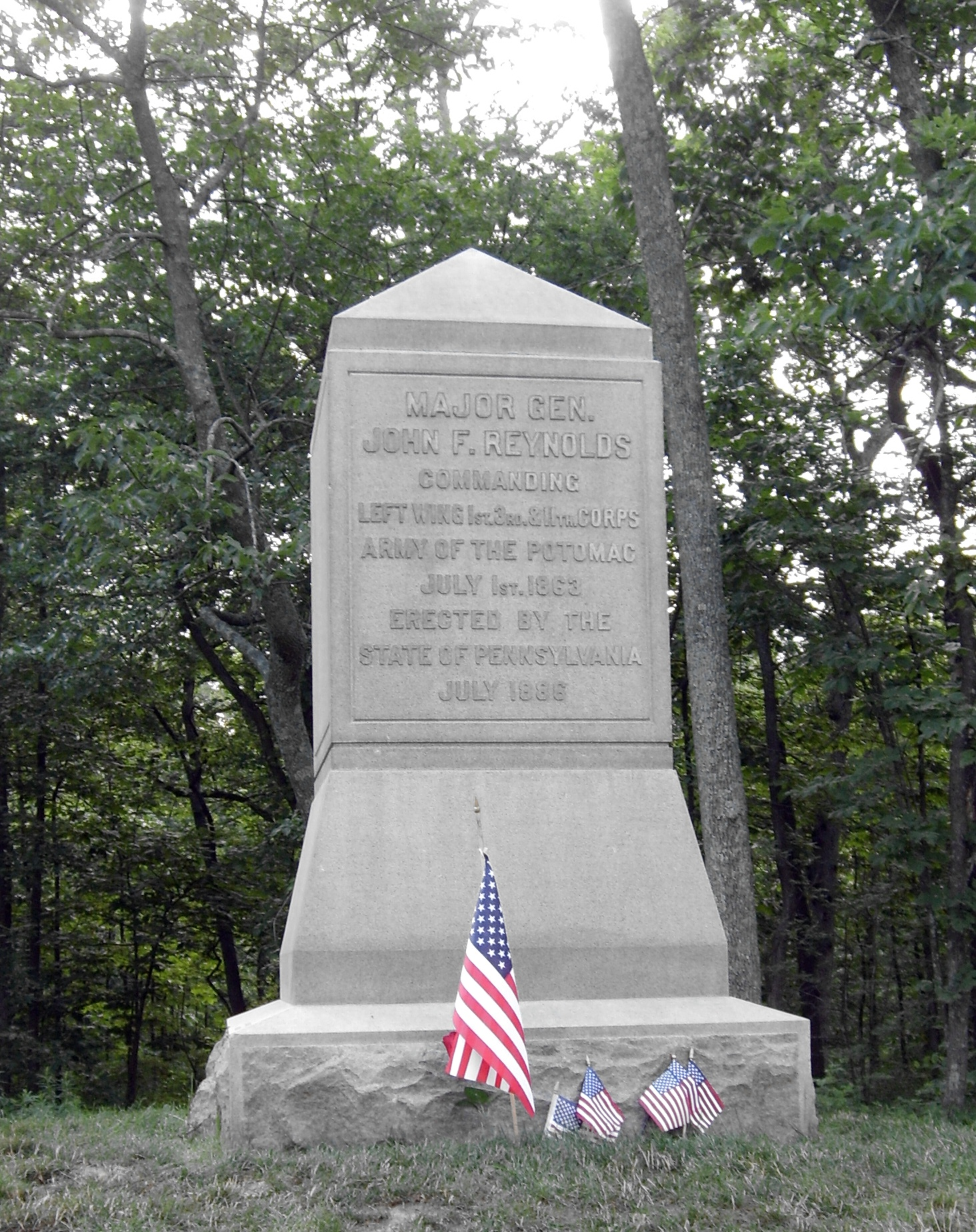
John F. Reynolds memorials
| Equestrian statue on McPherson Ridge, Chambersburg Pike, Gettysburg National Military Park, general view and closeup | Statue by John Quincy Adams Ward in the National Cemetery, Gettysburg National Military Park | In front of Philadelphia City Hall | Gettysburg, Penna |

== See also ==
- List of American Civil War generals (Union)
- Fort Reynolds (Colorado)
- Gen. John F. Reynolds School

== Notes ==
Military offices
| Preceded by George G. Meade | Commander of the I Corps (Army of the Potomac); September 29, 1862 – January 2, 1863 | Succeeded by James S. Wadsworth |
| Preceded by James S. Wadsworth | Commander of the I Corps (Army of the Potomac); January 4, 1863 – March 1, 1863 | Succeeded by James S. Wadsworth |
| Preceded by James S. Wadsworth | Commander of the I Corps (Army of the Potomac); March 9, 1863 – July 1, 1863 | Succeeded by Abner Doubleday |
