= Rǫgnvaldr =

Male given name

Rǫgnvaldr is an Old Norse name.

== People ==
- Rǫgnvaldr Guðrøðarson (died 1229), King of the Isles

== Derived or cognate names ==
Given names include:

- Rægnald
- Ragenald, German
- Ragenold, German
- Raghnall, Irish and Scottish Gaelic
- Raginald, German
- Ragnall, Old and Middle Irish
- Ragnar, Swedish
- Ragnvald, Danish and Norwegian
- Ragnvaldr, Norse
- Rainald, German
- Rainaldo
- Rainaldu, Latin
- Rainold, German
- Ranald, Scottish Gaelic
- Raynaldo, Spanish
- Raynaud, French
- Regenweald, Old English
- Reginald, English
- Reginaldas, Lithuanian
- Reginaldo, Portuguese
- Reginaldus, Latin
- Reginold, German
- Reginolt, German
- Reinald, Old French, Norman and German
- Reinaldo, Spanish and Portuguese
- Reinhold, German
- Reino, Finnish
- Reinold, Norman and German
- Reinoud, Dutch
- Reinout, Dutch
- Renald, French
- Renaldo
- Renaud, French
- Renaut, French
- Reynald, French
- Reynaldo, Portuguese
- Reynaud, French
- Reynold, English
- Rheinallt, Welsh
- Rinaldas, Lithuanian
- Rinaldo, Italian
- Rinalds, Latvian
- Rögnvald
- Rognvald, Norwegian
- Rögnvaldr
- Rögnvaldur, Icelandic
- Ronald, English and Scottish Gaelic
- Ronaldas, Lithuanian
- Ronaldo, Portuguese
- Ronalds, Latvian

Nicknames include:

- Reggie, English
- Ron, English
- Ronaldinho, Portuguese
- Ronnie, English
- Ronny, English

== See also ==
- Rey (given name)
- Rognvald
