= Ronaldo =

Ronaldo is a Portuguese given name equivalent to the English Ronald. It became a common name in all Portuguese-speaking countries, also prevalent in other Romance countries.

== People ==
Notable people known as Ronaldo include:

=== Association footballers ===
- Ronaldo (Brazilian footballer), full name Ronaldo Luís Nazário de Lima (born 1976), Brazilian footballer, also known as "O Fenômeno" and "R9"
- Cristiano Ronaldo (born 1985), Portuguese footballer, also known as "CR7"
- Ronaldinho, full name Ronaldo de Assis Moreira (born 1980), Brazilian footballer, also known as "Ronaldinho Gaúcho"
- Ronaldo Cezar Soares dos Santos (born 2000), Brazilian footballer
- Ronaldo da Silva Souza (born 1996), Brazilian footballer
- Ronaldo de Oliveira Strada (born 1996), Brazilian football goalkeeper
- Ronaldo Deaconu (born 1997), Romanian footballer
- Ronaldo Drummond (1946–2020), Brazilian footballer
- Ronaldo Giovanelli (born 1967), Brazilian football goalkeeper and pundit
- Ronaldo Green (born 2000), Bahamian footballer
- Ronaldo Guiaro (born 1974), Brazilian footballer
- Ronaldo Henrique Ferreira da Silva (born 1994), Brazilian footballer
- Ronaldo Henrique Silva (born 1991), Brazilian footballer
- Ronaldo Kwateh (born 2004), Indonesian footballer
- Ronaldo Lumungo Afonso (born 2000), Santomean football winger
- Ronaldo Maczinski (born 1980), Brazilian footballer
- Ronaldo Marques Sereno (born 1962), Brazilian football forward
- Ronaldo Oliveira (born 1997), an Indian footballer
- Ronaldo Passos (born 1959), Brazilian football goalkeeper
- Ronaldo Pereira Alves (born 1977), Brazilian footballer
- Ronaldo Pompeu da Silva (born 1990), Brazilian football midfielder
- Ronaldo Rodrigues de Jesus (born 1965), Brazilian footballer also known as Ronaldão
- Ronaldo Shani (born 2002), Greek football forward

=== Other people ===
- Ronaldo Cadeu (born 1977), Brazilian composer, conductor and classical guitarist
- Ronaldo Caiado (born 1949), Brazilian politician
- Ronaldo da Costa (born 1970), Brazilian long-distance runner
- Ronaldo Geron (born 1963), Filipino politician
- Ronaldo Mulitalo (born 1999), New Zealand-American Samoan rugby league player
- Ronaldo Munck (born 1951), Argentine sociologist
- Ronaldo Puno, (born 1948), Filipino campaign manager
- Ronaldo Souza (born 1979), Brazilian mixed martial artist and submission grappler
- Ronaldo Veitía (1947–2022), Cuban judoka
- Ronaldo Zamora (born 1944), Filipino lawyer and politician

== Fictional characters ==
- Ronaldo Fryman, a supporting character in the Steven Universe cartoon series

== See also ==
- Ronaldão
- Ronaldinho (given name)
- Renaldo, given name
- Rolando (disambiguation)
