= Renaut =

Renaut can be a masculine given name, a middle name, or a surname. Notable people with the name include:

== Given name ==
- Renaut de Louhans

== Middle name ==
- Robert Renaut Beezer (1928–2012), American judge

== Surname ==
- Emmanuel Renaut, French chef
- Éric Renaut (born 1954), French footballer
- Joseph-Louis Renaut
- Kévin Renaut (born 1991), French footballer
- Michael Renaut
- Rolando Renaut (born 1987), Paraguayan footballer
- Rosemary Renaut, British and American computational mathematician

== See also ==
- Renaud (name)
- Renault (name)
- Reginald
- Reynald
- Ronald
