= Ragnall (name) =

- Raghnall in a Gaelic type, note the lenited g in the name (gh) once appeared in Irish orthography with a dot above it, as pictured.
- Gender: Masculine
- Language: Old Irish, Middle Irish/Middle Gaelic

Origin
- Language: Old Norse
- Origin: Røgnvaldr, Rǫgnvaldr, Rögnvaldr
- Derivation: regin + valdr
- Meaning: "(German) Gods", "powerful"

Other names
- Cognate: see list
- Derivatives: Raghnall, Raonall, Raonull

Ragnall, Raghnall, Raonall, and Raonull are masculine personal names or given names in several Gaelic languages.

Ragnall occurs in Old Irish, and Middle Irish/Middle Gaelic. It is a Gaelicised form of the Old Norse Røgnvaldr, Rǫgnvaldr, Rögnvaldr. This Old Norse name is composed of two elements: regin, meaning "(Germanic) Gods"; and valdr, meaning "powerful". It has also been suggested that Ragnall could also represent the Old Norse Ragnarr as well. Ragnall can be Anglicised as Ranald and Ronald, and Latinised as Reginald, Reginaldus.

The modern spelling is Raghnall in Scottish Gaelic and either Raghnall or Raonull in Irish. Anglicised forms of Raghnall include: Ranald, Rannal, and Ronald.

The final -ll sound of the Gaelic names are de-vocalized, and to non-Gaelic-speakers this suggests -d sound. In this way the name is similar to the various forms of the Gaelic Domhnall, which can be Anglicised as Donald.

== List of cognates ==
- Danish: Ragnvald
- Dutch: Ronald, Ron, Ronny, Reinout
- English: Ranald, Reginald, Reynold, Ronald
- Faroese: Røgnvaldur, Ragnvaldur
- French: Reynaud
- German: Reinhold
- Icelandic: Rögnvaldur
- Italian: Rinaldo
- Latin: Reginald, Reginaldus
- Norwegian: Ragnvald
- Old French: Reinald, Reynaud
- Old German: Raginald
- Old Norse: Røgnvaldr, Rǫgnvaldr, Rögnvaldr
- Scots: Ranald, Rannal, Ran
- Swedish: Ragnvald
- Welsh: Rheinallt

== List of people with the given name ==
- Ragnall ua Ímair (died 921), king of the Fair and Dark Foreigners and king of Northumbria, the first known Ragnall
- Ragnall Guthfrithson (fl. 943-944), King of York
- Ragnall mac Gofraid (died 1004/1005), King of the Isles
- Ragnall mac Torcaill (died 1146), ruler of Dublin
- Ragnall Olafsson (fl. 1164), mediaeval ruler of the Isle of Man
- Ragnall Mac Gilla Muire (fl. 1170), leader of Waterford
- Raghnall mac Somhairle (died 1207), king of the Isles and Argyll
- Raghnall mac Gofraidh (died 1229), king of Mann and the Isles
- Raghnall mac Amhlaibh (fl. 1249), king of Mann
- Ranald MacDonald (died 1386) founder of Clanranald
- Ranald George Macdonald (1788-1873), chief of Clan Macdonald of Clanranald and Member of Parliament
- Raonall Smith (born 1978), American, professional American football player

== As a patronymic ==
- Echmarcach mac Ragnaill (fl. 11th century), king of Dublin, Man and the Isles, and the Rhinns
- Ascall mac Ragnaill (died 1171), the last king of Dublin
- Gofraid mac Ragnaill (died 1231), king of the Isles
- Domhnall mac Raghnaill (fl. early-mid 13th century), Hebridean flaith (prince) and progenitor of Clan Donald
