= Regina (given name) =

- Pronunciation: /ˈrɪdʒinə/
- Gender: Female
- Language: European

Other gender
- Masculine: Reginald

Origin
- Language: Latin
- Origin: Latin: regina
- Meaning: "queen"
- Region of origin: Italy

Other names
- Short form: Gina
- Nickname: Reggie
- Related names: Regine, Reginald

Regina is a Late Latin feminine name meaning "queen" from the Latin, Italian, Portuguese and Romanian word meaning the same. Regina was the name of an early Christian saint.

Variant forms include:

- Queenie (English)
- Raina, Rayna, Raya (Bulgarian)
- Régine (French)
- Ρήγαινα (Rigena, Regena), Ρεγγίνα,(Regina), Βασίλισσα (Vasilissa) (Greek)
- Regine (German/Norwegian)
- Ríona, Ríonach (Irish)
- Reina (Spanish)

== Notable people ==
- Regina (freedwoman) (2nd-century), a Romano-British woman known from her tombstone at South Shields, UK.
- Regina Askia-Williams (born 1967), Nigerian actress and model
- Régina Badet (1876–1949), French actress and dancer
- Regina Belle (born 1963), American singer-songwriter
- Regina Benjamin (born 1956), American physician
- Regina de Jesús Betancourt Ramírez (born 1936), known to her followers as Regina 11, Colombian self-described mystic, faith healer, mentalist and psychic
- Regina Bianchi (1921–2013), Italian actress
- Regina Casé (born 1954), Brazilian actress, screenwriter, director, producer and television presenter
- Regina Marie Cuttita (fl. 1978–1993), stage name Regina (American singer), American pop singer
- Regīna Ezera (1930–2002), Latvian author
- Regina Frank (born 1965), German textile artist
- Regina Freitas (born 1960), Timorese politician
- Regina Fryxell (1899–1993), American educator and musician
- Regina Chistyakova (born 1961), Lithuanian distance runner
- Regina George (sprinter) (born 1991), American-born Nigerian sprinter
- Regina Gwynn (born 1979), American tech entrepreneur
- Regina Honu, Ghanaian social entrepreneur and software developer
- Regina José Galindo (born 1974), Guatemalan performance artist
- Regina Kalinichenko (born 1985), Ukrainian and Russian handballer
- Regina Kapeller-Adler (1900–1991), Austrian biochemist
- Regina Khayatt (1881–?), Egyptian educator, philanthropist, feminist, suffragist and temperance worker
- Regina King, (born 1971), American actress and director
- Regina Kittler (born 1955), German politician
- Regina Kodymová-Jirkalová (born 1966), Czech sports shooter
- Regina Kopp-Herr (born 1957), German politician
- Regina de Lamo (1870–1947), Spanish intellectual
- Regina Lesoma, South African politician
- Regina Leung (born 1957), Hong Kong solicitor
- Regina Louise (born 1963), American author, child advocate and motivational speaker
- Regina M. Anderson (1901–1993), American playwright and librarian
- Regina Maršíková (born 1958), Czech tennis player
- Regina Martínez Pérez (1963–2012), Mexican journalist
- Regina Nissen (born 1961), German swimmer
- Regina Quintanilha (1893–1967), Portuguese lawyer
- Regina Rajchrtová (born 1968), Czech tennis player
- Regina Resnik (1922–2013), American opera singer
- Regina Shotaro (born 1981), Micronesian sprinter
- Regina Spektor (born 1980), Russian-born American singer
- Regina Uchoa (born 1959), Brazilian volleyball player
- Regina Veloso (1939–2024), was a Portuguese swimmer
- Regina von Habsburg (1925–2010), German-born Austrian social worker
- Regina Washington, American public health professional, activist and researcher

== See also ==
- Regina (disambiguation)
- Regina (name)
- Reginald
