= Reggie =

- Pronunciation: /ˈrɛdʒi/
- Gender: Unisex
- Language: English

Origin
- Languages: Germanic; Latin
- Origin: 1. Reginald; 2. Regina
- Meaning: Diminutive form of Reginald and Regina
- Region of origin: English-speaking world

Other names
- Variant form: Regie
- Related names: Reginald, Regina, Regine, Reg

Reggie is a given name, usually a short form of Reginald (male) or Regina (female).

== Men with the given name ==
- Reggie Bonnafon (born 1996), American football player
- Reggie Brown (disambiguation), multiple people
- Reggie Bush (born 1985), National Football League running back for the New Orleans Saints
- Reggie Cleveland (born 1948), former Major League Baseball pitcher
- Reggie Corrigan (born 1970), former Irish rugby union player
- Reggie Fils-Aimé (born 1961), former president and COO for the North American division of Nintendo
- Reggie Gilliam (born 1997), American football player
- Reggie Jackson (born 1946), American retired baseball player
- Reggie Johnson (disambiguation), multiple people
- Reggie Jones (disambiguation), multiple people
- Reggie Kray (1933–2000), of the criminal Kray twins
- Reggie Leach (born 1950), Canadian retired hockey player
- Reggie Lucas (1953–2018), American musician and record producer
- Reggie Mathis (born 1956), American football player
- Reggie Miller (born 1965), former basketball player for the Indiana Pacers
- Reggie Montgomery (1947–2002), American actor and clown
- Reggie Perry (basketball) (born 2000), American basketball player
- Reggie Redding (born 1988), American basketballer
- Reggie Redding (American football) (born 1968), American football player
- Reggie Robinson (born 1997), American football player
- Reggie Roby (1961–2005), American football punter
- Reggie Sanders (born 1967), former baseball player
- Reggie Sanderson (born 1950), American football player
- Reggie Schwarz (1875–1918), South African cricketer
- Reggie Smith (disambiguation), multiple people
- Reggie Theus (born 1957), former National Basketball Association player and head coach, currently assistant coach of the Minnesota Timberwolves
- Reggie Upshaw (born 1995), American basketball player in the Israel Basketball Premier League
- Reggie Virgil (born 2004), American football player
- Reggie Walker (disambiguation), multiple people
- Reggie Watts (born 1972), American comedian and musician
- Reggie Wayne (born 1978), wide receiver for the Indianapolis Colts
- Reggie White (disambiguation), multiple people
- Reggie Williams (disambiguation), multiple people
- Reggie Yates (born 1983), English DJ
- Reggie Young (1936–2019), lead guitarist of the American Sound Studios Band
- Reggie (wrestler) (born 1993), American professional wrestler

== Women with the given name ==
- Reggie Baff (born 1949), American actress
- Reggie Bennett (born 1961), American professional wrestler
- Reggie de Jong (born 1964), Dutch swimmer
- Reggie Gavin (born 1995), American drag queen and model
- Reggie Magloire (1964–2023), Congolese-American singer, model, and actress
- Reggie Meredith-Fitiao, American-Samoan artist and academic
- Reggie Miller (politician), American politician
- Reggie Nadelson, American novelist
- Reggie Sahali-Generale, Filipino politician
- Reggie Sorensen (born 1974), American television personality
- Reggie Twala (1908–1968), South African feminist and political activist
- Reggie Wallace (1886–1978), American actress

== Fictional characters ==
- Reggie (Phantasm), protagonist in the Phantasm horror film series
- A-Train (comics) / Reggie Franklin, a superhero in the television franchise The Boys
- Reggie Mantle, in the Archie comics
- Reggie Montgomery, from the soap opera All My Children
- Reggie Pepper, in seven short stories by P. G. Wodehouse
- Reggie Perrin, the main character in The Fall and Rise of Reginald Perrin novel and 1970s television series, as well as the 2000s Reggie Perrin television series
- Reggie Potter, title character of the 1983 American TV series Reggie, based on the series The Fall and Rise of Reggie Perrin
- Reggie Rowe, in the video game Infamous Second Son

== Animals ==
- Reggie (alligator)
