= List of 2009–10 Portuguese Liga transfers =

The transfers for the Portuguese Liga for the 2009–10 season began after the 2008–09 season finished on 1 July 2009 and closed at midnight on 1 September 2009. The transfer window then reopened during January 2010.

== Summer 2009 ==
- 1/7/2009 (Brazil) Patric — (Brazil) São Caetano → Benfica — €3 million
- 1/7/2009 (Portugal) Miguel Lopes — Rio Ave → Porto — €600,000
- 1/7/2009 (Portugal) Orlando Sá — Braga → Porto — Undisclosed
- 1/7/2009 (Portugal) Silvestre Varela — Estrela da Amadora → Porto — Free
- 1/7/2009 (Brazil) Ramires — (Brazil) Cruzeiro → Benfica — €7.5 million
- 1/7/2009 (Uruguay) Luis Aguiar — Braga → (Russia) Dynamo Moscow — €3 million
- 1/7/2009 (Venezuela) Angelo Peña — (Venezuela) Estudiantes de Mérida → Braga — Undisclosed
- 1/7/2009 (Brazil) Peçanha — (Greece) Thrasyvoulos → Marítimo — Free
- 1/7/2009 (France) Jonathan Bru — (Cyprus) AEP Paphos → Académica de Coimbra — Free
- 1/7/2009 (Paraguay) David Mendieta — (Paraguay) 12 de Octubre → Vitória de Guimarães — €150,000
- 1/7/2009 (Portugal) Alex — (Germany) Wolfsburg → Vitória de Guimarães — Free
- 1/7/2009 (United States) Kamani Hill — (Germany) Wolfsburg → Vitória de Guimarães — Free
- 1/7/2009 (Brazil) Maicon — Nacional → Porto — €1.1 million
- 1/7/2009 (Uruguay) Álvaro Pereira — (Romania) CFR Cluj → Porto — €4.5 million
- 1/7/2009 (Slovakia) Boris Peškovič — Académica de Coimbra → (Romania) CFR Cluj — Free
- 1/7/2009 (Portugal) Paulo Machado — Porto → (France) Toulouse — €3.5 million
- 1/7/2009 (Argentina) José Shaffer — (Argentina) Racing Club → Benfica — €2 million
- 1/7/2009 (Portugal) Anselmo — Estrela da Amadora → Nacional — Free
- 1/7/2009 (Brazil) Marcelo Boeck — Marítimo → Varzim — Loan
- 1/7/2009 (Slovenia) Nejc Pečnik — (Slovenia) NK Celje → Nacional — Undisclosed
- 1/7/2009 (Portugal) Jorge Gonçalves — (Spain) Racing de Santander → Vitória de Guimarães — Loan
- 1/7/2009 (Portugal) Paulo Jorge — Braga → (Cyprus) APOEL — Undisclosed
- 1/7/2009 (Portugal) Ruben Ribeiro — Leixões → Nacional — Undisclosed
- 1/7/2009 (Portugal) Manuel José — (Romania) CFR Cluj → Paços de Ferreira — Undisclosed
- 1/7/2009 (Portugal) José Marafona — Varzim → Marítimo — Undisclosed
- 1/7/2009 (Portugal) Nuno Piloto — Académica de Coimbra → (Greece) Iraklis — Undisclosed
- 1/7/2009 (Portugal) Carlos Milhazes — (Romania) Timişoara → Vitória de Guimarães — €200,000
- 1/7/2009 (Brazil) Gustavo Lazzaretti — (Brazil) Atlético PR → Vitória de Guimarães — Undisclosed
- 1/7/2009 (Brazil) Nenê — Nacional → (Italy) Cagliari — €4.5 million
- 1/7/2009 (Portugal) Igor Pita — (Portugal) Nacional → Beira-Mar — Loan
- 1/7/2009 (Brazil) Jairo — (Brazil) Figueirense → Nacional — Undisclosed
- 1/7/2009 (Angola) Marco Airosa — Nacional → (Angola) Inter Luanda — Loan
- 1/7/2009 (France) Gregory — Vitória de Guimarães → (Spain) Sporting de Gijón — Undisclosed
- 1/7/2009 (Greece) Kostas Katsouranis — Benfica → (Greece) Panathinaikos — €2.5 million
- 1/7/2009 (Portugal) João Tomás — Boavista → Rio Ave — Free
- 1/7/2009 (Argentina) Javier Saviola — (Spain) Real Madrid → Benfica — €5 million
- 1/7/2009 (Chile) Matías Fernández — (Spain) Villarreal → Sporting CP — €3.635 million
- 1/7/2009 (Colombia) Brayan Angulo — Leixões → (Spain) Deportivo La Coruña — Loan
- 1/7/2009 (Brazil) Ney — Estrela da Amadora → Braga — Free
- 1/7/2009 (Portugal) Fernando Alexandre — Estrela da Amadora → Braga — Free
- 1/7/2009 (Portugal) Beto — Leixões → Porto — €750,000
- 1/7/2009 (Argentina) Lucho González — Porto → (France) Marseille — €18 million
- 1/7/2009 (Portugal) Diogo Valente — Porto → Braga — Free
- 1/7/2009 (Brazil) Joabe — (Brazil) Villa Nova → Braga — Undisclosed
- 1/7/2009 (Portugal) Castanheira — Braga → (Cyprus) APOEL — Free
- 1/7/2009 (Portugal) Bruno Amaro — Nacional → Académica de Coimbra — Loan
- 1/7/2009 (Morocco) Tarik Sektioui — Porto → (United Arab Emirates) Ajman Club — Free
- 2/7/2009 (Italy) Rodrigo Possebon — (England) Manchester United → Braga — Loan
- 4/7/2009 (Portugal) Stélvio — Braga → União de Leiria — Loan
- 5/7/2009 (Nigeria) Kevin Amuneke — (Romania) Timişoara → Nacional — Free
- 6/7/2009 (Argentina) Lisandro López — Porto → (France) Lyon — €24 million
- 6/7/2009 (Argentina) Fernando Belluschi — (Greece) Olympiacos → Porto — €5 million
- 7/7/2009 (Brazil) Fellipe Cardoso — Olhanense → (Brazil) Sapucaiense — Free
- 7/7/2009 (Senegal) Ladji Keita — (Cyprus) AEP → Vitória de Setúbal — Undisclosed Fee
- 7/7/2009 (France) Ulick Lupede — (France) Rodez → Naval 1º de Maio — Free
- 8/7/2009 (Brazil) Diego Gaúcho — Gil Vicente → Olhanense — Free
- 8/7/2009 (Argentina) Cristián Trombetta — (Argentina) Nueva Chicago → Leixões — Undisclosed
- 8/7/2009 (Brazil) Cauê — (Brazil) Santo André → Leixões — Free
- 8/7/2009 (Portugal) Bruno Gama — Porto → Rio Ave — Free
- 8/7/2009 (Portugal) Chico Silva — Paços de Ferreira → Oliveirense — Free
- 8/7/2009 (Brazil) Kiko — Paços de Ferreira → Gil Vicente — Loan
- 8/7/2009 (Portugal) João Pedro — União de Leiria → Oliveirense — Free
- 9/7/2009 (Portugal) Filipe da Costa — (Bulgaria) Levski Sofia → Nacional — Undisclosed
- 9/7/2009 (Brazil) Paulão — Naval 1º de Maio → Braga — Undisclosed
- 9/7/2009 (Brazil) Leandro Salino — Nacional → (Brazil) Náutico — Free
- 10/7/2009 (Portugal) Miguel Rosa — Benfica → Oliveirense — Loan
- 10/7/2009 (Brazil) Wender — Braga → (Cyprus) Ermis Aradippou — Free
- 10/7/2009 (Portugal) Candeias — Porto → (Spain) Recreativo de Huelva — Loan
- 10/7/2009 (Portugal) Vieirinha — Porto → (Greece) PAOK — €350,000
- 11/7/2009 (Brazil) Wagnão — União de Leiria → Feirense — Free
- 11/7/2009 (Poland) Przemysław Kaźmierczak — Porto → Vitória de Setúbal — Loan
- 11/7/2009 (Serbia) Vukašin Dević — (Serbia) Red Star Belgrade → Belenenses — Free
- 13/7/2009 (Brazil) Joeano — Vitória de Setúbal → (Cyprus) Ermis Aradippou — Free
- 13/7/2009 (Portugal) João Fajardo — Vitória de Guimarães → (Greece) Panthrakikos — Free
- 14/7/2009 (Brazil) Saulo — Belenenses → (Spain) Celta de Vigo — Undisclosed
- 14/7/2009 (Brazil) Ibson — Porto → (Russia) Spartak Moscow — €5 million
- 14/7/2009 (Portugal) Vítor Vinha — Académica de Coimbra → (Cyprus) Nea Salamis Famagusta — Free
- 14/7/2009 (Cape Verde) Janício — Vitória de Setúbal → (Cyprus) Anorthosis Famagusta — Undisclosed
- 14/7/2009 (Croatia) Lovro Šćrbec — Nacional → (Croatia) Varteks — Free
- 14/7/2009 (Portugal) Miguel Tininho — Belenenses → (Romania) Steaua București — Free
- 14/7/2009 (Argentina) Fernando Ávalos — Belenenses → (Cyprus) Nea Salamis — Free
- 15/7/2009 (Portugal) Vítor Castanheira — Braga → Chaves — Loan
- 15/7/2009 (Portugal) Hugo Santos — Naval 1º de Maio → (China) Hangzhou Greentown — Free
- 15/7/2009 (Colombia) Falcao — (Argentina) River Plate → Porto — €3.93 million
- 15/7/2009 (Brazil) Maykon — Belenenses → Paços de Ferreira — Free
- 15/7/2009 (Portugal) Pedro Alves — Vitória de Setúbal → Pinhalnovense — Free
- 15/7/2009 (Portugal) Romeu Ribeiro — Benfica → Trofense — Loan
- 15/7/2009 (Argentina) Diego Valeri — (Argentina) Lanús → Porto — €2.3 million (Loan for 2 years)
- 16/7/2009 (Portugal) Hélder Barbosa — Porto → Vitória de Setúbal — Loan
- 16/7/2009 (Portugal) Filipe Mendes — Estrelada Amadora → Paços de Ferreira — Free
- 17/7/2009 (Portugal) Jaime — Olhanense → Sertanense — Free
- 17/7/2009 (Portugal) Ruben Lima — Benfica → Vitória de Setúbal — Loan
- 17/7/2009 (Portugal) Diogo Viana — Porto → (Netherlands) VVV-Venlo — Loan
- 17/7/2009 (Brazil) Aldo — (Brazil) Cruzeiro → Marítimo — Loan
- 17/7/2009 (Portugal) Ruca — Porto → Marítimo — Free
- 17/7/2009 (Portugal) Carlos Carneiro — Paços de Ferreira → Vizela — Free
- 17/7/2009 (Brazil) Leandro Lima — Porto → (Brazil) Cruzeiro — Loan
- 18/7/2009 (Argentina) Robert Tucker — (Argentina) Quilmes → Leixões — Free
- 19/7/2009 (France) Aly Cissokho — Porto → (France) Lyon — €15 million
- 19/7/2009 (Portugal) Gonçalo — Académica de Coimbra → Santa Clara — Loan
- 19/7/2009 (Brazil) Juninho — Nacional → (Brazil) Bahia — Undisclosed
- 19/7/2009 (Croatia) Kristian Pavlović — Nacional → Santana — Loan
- 20/7/2009 (Portugal) Pelé — Porto → (Spain) Real Valladolid — Loan
- 20/7/2009 (Brazil) Hammes — (Brazil) Rio Branco → União de Leiria — Free
- 20/7/2009 (Brazil) Alberto — (Brazil) Rio Branco → União de Leiria — Free
- 21/7/2009 (Spain) Javi García — (Spain) Real Madrid → Benfica — €7 million
- 21/7/2009 (Brazil) Luiz Carlos — União de Leiria → (Hong Kong) South China — Free
- 22/7/2009 (Portugal) Maciel — União Leiria → Gil Vicente — Loan
- 22/7/2009 (Brazil) Bruno Grassi — Marítimo → Tourizense — Loan
- 22/7/2009 (Brazil) Weldon — (Brazil) Sport Recife → Benfica — €200,000
- 23/7/2009 (Ecuador) Felipe Caicedo — (England) Manchester City → Sporting CP — Loan
- 25/8/2009 (Brazil) Adriano – FC Porto → } SC Braga – Free
- 28/8/2009 (Brazil) Felipe Menezes – (Brazil) Goiás → Benfica – 1,500,000 €
- 28/8/2009 (Algeria) Mehdi Kerrouche – (France) GFCO Ajaccio → Naval 1º de Maio – Free
- 29/8/2009 (Spain) Miguel Angulo – (Spain) Valencia → Sporting CP – Free
- 29/8/2009 (Brazil) Wênio – Vitória Guimarães → Leixões – Free
- 29/8/2009 (Brazil) Jorginho – SC Braga → (Turkey) Gaziantepspor – Free
- 30/8/2009 (Austria) Roland Linz – SC Braga → (Turkey) Gaziantepspor – Undisclosed
- 30/8/2009 (Brazil) Ronaldo Maczinski – Rio Ave → Oliveirense – Free
- 30/8/2009 (Montenegro) Milan Purović – Sporting CP → (Hungary) Videoton – Loan
- 30/8/2009 (Senegal) El Hadji Diouf → (Greece) AEK Athens – Vitória Setúbal – Free
- 30/8/2009 (Portugal) Tiago Pinto – Sporting CP → SC Braga – Free
- 30/8/2009 (Brazil) Tiago Luís – (Brazil) Santos → União Leiria – Free
- 31/8/2009 (Portugal) Patric – Benfica → (Brazil) Cruzeiro – Loan

== Winter 2009–10 ==
- 1/1/2010 (Portugal) Neca – (Turkey) Ankaraspor – Vitória Setúbal – Free
- 1/1/2010 (Mozambique) Mexer – (Mozambique) GD Maputo → Sporting CP – 166,000 €
- 1/1/2010 (Portugal) João Pereira – SC Braga → Sporting CP – 3,000,000 €
- 1/1/2010 (France) Florent Sinama Pongolle – (Spain) Atlético Madrid → Sporting CP – 6,500,000 €
- 1/1/2010 (Serbia) Vladimir Stojković – Sporting CP → (England) Wigan Athletic – Loan
- 1/1/2010 (Brazil) Edcarlos – Benfica → (Mexico) Cruz Azul – Loan
- 1/1/2010 (Brazil) Airton – (Brazil) Flamengo – Benfica – 2,500,000 €
- 1/1/2010 (Brazil) Alan Kardec – (Brazil) Vasco Da Gama – Benfica – 2,600,000 €
- 1/1/2010 (Brazil) Éder Luís – (Brazil) Atlético Mineiro – Benfica – 3,500,000 €
- 4/1/2010 (Romania) László Sepsi – Benfica → Timişoara – 1,500,000 €
- 5/1/2010 (Uruguay) Jonathan Urretavizcaya – Benfica – (Uruguay) Peñarol – Loan
- 6/1/2010 (United States) Freddy Adu – Benfica – (Greece) Aris – Loan
- 8/1/2010 (Colombia) Wason Rentería – FC Porto → SC Braga – Loan
- 15/1/2010 (Uruguay) Luis Aguiar – (Russia) Dynamo Moscow → SC Braga – Loan
- 30/1/2010 (Portugal) Pedro Mendes – (Scotland) Glasgow Rangers → Sporting CP – 1,300,000 €
- 1/2/2010 (Algeria) Abdelmalek Cherrad – (France) - SC Bastia → C.S. Marítimo – Free
