= Rayno =

Rayno is a given name. Notable people with the given name include:

- Rayno Arendse (born 1978), South African cricketer
- Rayno Benjamin (born 1983), South African rugby union footballer
- Rayno Gerber (born 1981), South African rugby union footballer
- Rayno Nel (born 1995), South African strongman
- Rayno Seegers (born 1952), South African tennis player

== See also ==
- Ronald
- Reynold
- Raghnall
