= Renaud (name) =

Renaud is a male French given name, related to the English name Reynold or Ronald.

== People with the surname Renaud ==
- Albert Renaud (1855−1924), French organist and composer
- Albert Renaud (1920−2021), Canadian ice hockey player
- Brendan Renaud (born 1973), Australian footballer
- Brent Renaud (1971–2022), American journalist
- Chantal Renaud (born 1945), Canadian writer and singer
- Élisabeth Renaud (1846–1932), French teacher, socialist activist, and feminist; co-founder, Groupe Feministe Socialiste
- Francis Renaud (actor) (born 1967), French actor
- Francis Renaud (sculptor) (1887–1973), French sculptor
- François Renaud (1923–1975), French judge, assassinated
- Gwenaël Renaud (born 1983), French footballer
- Hippolyte Renaud (1803–1874), French artillery officer socialist, and journalist
- Jean Renaud de Segrais (1624–1701), French poet
- Jeanne Renaud-Mornant (1925-2012), French biologist
- Lilian Renaud (born 1991), French singer
- Line Renaud (born 1928), French female singer and actress
- Madeleine Renaud (1900–1994), French actress
- Marcel Renaud (cyclist) (1900–1968), French Olympic cyclist
- Marcel Renaud (canoeist) (1926–2016) French Olympic sprint canoer
- Marie Renaud, Canadian politician
- Michelle Renaud (born 1988), Mexican actress
- Mike Renaud (born 1983), Canadian football punter
- Paul Renaud (born 1975), French comic book artist and illustrator
- Suzanne Renaud (1889–1964), French poet and translator
- Thérèse Renaud (1927–2005), Canadian actress and writer

== People with the given name Renaud ==
=== Pre–20th century ===
- Renaud I, name of multiple French noblemen
- Renaud II, Count of Clermont-en-Beauvaisis (1075–1152), French nobleman
- Renauld II, Count of Nevers (d. 1089), French nobleman
- Renaud III, Count of Soissons (d. 1141), French nobleman
- Renaud de Montauban, French knight
- Renaud de Pons, name of multiple French noblemen
- Renaud of Briel, 13th-century French knight
- Renaud of Herbauges, Frankish nobleman
- Renaud of Roucy (920 – 967), Viking with Frankish allegiances
- Renaud of Vendôme, early French chancellor

=== 20th century–present ===
- Renaud Camus (born 1946), French novelist and conspiracy theorist
- Renaud Capuçon (born 1976), French classical violinist
- Renaud Cohade (born 1984), French footballer
- Renaud Denauw (born 1936), Belgian comic book artist
- Renaud Garcia-Fons (born 1962) is a French bassist and composer
- Renaud Girard (born 1955), French journalist and writer
- Renaud Hardy (born 1962), Belgian serial killer
- Renaud Jamoul (born 1984), Belgian race car driver
- Renaud Jay (born 1991), French cross-country skier
- Renaud Kerbrat, French gun designer
- Renaud Laplanche (born 1970), French American entrepreneur and business executive
- Renaud Lavillenie (born 1986), French pole vaulter
- Renaud Marhic (born 1965), French writer
- Renaud Muselier (born 1959), French physician and politician
- Renaud Ripart (born 1993), French footballer
- Renaud Verley (born 1945), French actor

== See also ==
- Renaud (disambiguation)
- Renault (name)
