= Rek =

Rek or REK may refer to:

- Rek people, of South Sudan
- Rek language
- Rek, a Cambodian board game
- Vitold Rek (born 1955), Polish musician
- Rek or Reg, Iran, Khusf County, South Khorasan Province
- Rek or Rig-e Bala, a village in Khusf County, South Khorasan Province, Iran
- Rek or Rik, Iran, a village in Talesh County, Gilan Province
- Robert Earl Keen, an American country music singer
