= Reginald White =

Reginald White may refer to:

- Reg White (1935–2010), English boat builder and sailor
- Reginald White (British Army officer), Commander of the Ceylon Defence Force

== See also ==
- Reggie White (disambiguation)
