= Reginald (disambiguation) =

Reginald is a masculine given name. It may also refer to:

- Reginald, a 1904 collection of short stories by Saki
- Andy Dinh, professional gamer known by his gamer tag "Reginald"

== See also ==
- Reg (disambiguation)
