= Ranald =

- Gender: Masculine
- Language: Scots, English

Origin
- Language: Scottish Gaelic
- Origin: Raghnall

Other names
- See also: Ronald

Ranald is a Scots and English masculine given name. It is an Anglicised form of the Scottish Gaelic name Raghnall, and a Scots version of Ronald. A short form of Ranald is Ran.

== Notable persons ==
- Ranald Graham (1941–2010), Scottish writer, television director and producer
- Ranald MacDonald (bishop) (1756–1832), Scottish Roman Catholic bishop
- Ranald George Macdonald (1788–1873), Scottish clan chief and Member of British Parliament
- Ranald MacDonald (1824–1894), English language teacher in Japan
- Ranald Roderick Macdonald (1945–2007), British mathematician and psychologist
- Ranald MacDougall (1915–1973), American screenwriter
- Ranald S. Mackenzie (1840–1889), United States Army officer and general during the Civil War
- Ranald Sutherland, Lord Sutherland (1932–2025), Scottish judge

== Fictional characters ==
- Ranald Bannerman from Ranald Bannerman's Boyhood, a novel by George MacDonald
