= Reggie (disambiguation) =

Reggie is a given name; the target article includes a list of notable people with that name.

Reggie may also refer to:

== People ==
- Reggie (wrestler), ring name of Sidney Iking Bateman (born 1993), American professional wrestler
- Denis Reggie, American wedding photographer
- Nickname of Harry George Smart (1891–1963), British vice air marshal
- An alias of James Dewees (born 1976), American rock musician who released three albums under the band name Reggie and the Full Effect

== Arts and entertainment ==
- Reggie (album), the seventh studio album of Redman, released in 2010
- Reggie (TV series), a short-lived 1983 American television series
- Reggie (film), a 2023 American documentary film
- Reggie's, a diner frequented in the sitcom Seinfeld

== Other uses ==
- Reggie (alligator), an American alligator in captivity at the Los Angeles Zoo
- The Reggie, colloquial name of the Reggie Lewis Track and Athletic Center in Boston, Massachusetts, U.S.
- Reggies, a restaurant and music venue in Chicago, Illinois, U.S.
- RGGI (pronounced as "Reggie"), an acronym for the Regional Greenhouse Gas Initiative

== See also ==
- Reg (disambiguation)
