= Rögnvaldsson =

Rögnvaldsson is a surname. Notable people with the surname include:

- Echmarcach Rognvaldsson (died 1064), dominant figure in the eleventh-century Irish Sea region
- Eiríkur Rögnvaldsson (born 1955), Icelandic linguist, professor of Icelandic at the University of Iceland
- Guðrøðr Rǫgnvaldsson (died 1231), AKA Guðrøðr Dond, ruler of the Kingdom of the Isles
- Hallad Rognvaldsson, Norse jarl ruling the archipelagos of Orkney and Shetland
- Jón Rögnvaldsson (died 1625), alleged Icelandic sorcerer
- Petur Rognvaldsson (1934–2007), Icelandic-born athlete and actor
- Robert Rognvaldsson (died between 928 and 933), Viking who became the first ruler of Normandy

== See also ==
- Ronaldson
