= List of people from American Samoa =

Flag of American Samoa

This is a list of notable people from American Samoa.

== Arts and crafts ==
- Mary Jewett Pritchard (1905–1992) was a master siapo (tapa cloth) maker and teacher.
- Sven Ortquist (1938–2013) was a master wood carver.
- Reggie Meredith-Fitiao is an expert in siapo and professor at American Samoa Community College.

== Beauty pageants ==
- Marion Malena is a multiple beauty pageant winner and performer. Malena resides in Seattle, Wa.

== Film and stage ==
- John Kneubuhl (1920–1992) was a Hollywood screenwriter, playwright and Polynesian historian. He wrote for American television series such as The Fugitive, Gunsmoke, The Wild Wild West, Star Trek, The Invaders and Hawaii Five-O. An annual award named in his honor is presented by the department of education to local students.
- Freddie Letuli (1919–2003) was the pioneer of the world-famous Polynesian fire knife dance. He toured across the United States and Europe, appearing in TV shows and movies. Letuli died in 2003. The annual World Fire Knife competition is held each year in his honor.
- Al Harrington (1935–2021) was a Hollywood character actor best known for playing Detective Ben Kokua on the original Hawaii Five-O.
- Hollywood actor Eric Stoltz (born 1961) lived with his family in American Samoa. His father was the principal of Leone High School in the late 1960s.
- Gary Scott Thompson (born 1959) is a Hollywood screenwriter, television producer and director. He is best known for his work on the Fast & the Furious film series.
- Queen Muhammad Ali (Queen Melé Le'iato Tuiasosopo Muhammad Ali) is a film director, photographer, graphic design artist, multimedia activist, lecturer, television producer, model, writer, visual anthropologist and the Director of Manuia Samoa. Ali is also the great-granddaughter of Paramount Chief Tuli Le'iato of American Samoa.

== Literature ==
- Author Sia Figiel (1967–2026) was an educator for Fa'asao-Marist and Samoana High School. Figiel was a special liaison for the congressman's office for several years.
- Fofō Iosefa Fiti Sunia (1937–2025) founded American Samoa's first newspaper in the 1960s and was later elected as a non-voting delegate to the U.S. House of Representatives, serving from 1981 to 1988. Sunia published a series of books, among them The story of the legislature of American Samoa: 1948–1998 and Puputoa: A Host of Heroes.

== Music ==
- The Katinas is a famed contemporary Christian music group composed of brothers.

== Politics ==
- Tulsi Gabbard (born 1981) is the current Director of National Intelligence and served as a member of the United States congress representing Hawaii's 2nd congressional district.
- Arieta Enesi Mulitauaopele (1923–1990) was the first Samoan woman to run for election as Lieutenant Governor of American Samoa.
- Aumua Amata Coleman Radewagen (born 1947) is a member of the United States House of Representatives representing American Samoa. Her father was the first democratically elected governor of American Samoa. Coleman Radewagen is a Republican, and she serves on the Committee on Natural Resources, the Committee on small business and the Committee on Veterans' Affairs.

== Sports ==
- Jaiyah Saelua (born 1988) is the world's first transgender soccer player to play in a FIFA World Cup qualifier. She features in the 2014 British film Next Goal Wins.
- Tony Solaita (1947–1990) was Samoa's only major league baseball player. He played for the New York Yankees, Kansas City Royals, California Angels, Montreal Expos and Toronto Blue Jays. Solaita was killed during a family dispute in 1990. A popular park and sporting field in Tafuna is named in his honor.
- Afa Anoaʻi (1943–2024) and Sika Anoaʻi (1945–2024) were professional wrestlers known as The Wild Samoans. They held 21 tag team championships around the world. They were the patriarchs of the Anoaʻi family, which includes many professional wrestlers, including Yokozuna (1966–2000), former tag team champions Solofa Fatu (born 1965), Sam Fatu (born 1965) and Samula Anoaʻi (born 1963), Roman Reigns (born 1985) and Eddie Fatu (1973–2009), among others.
- High Chief Peter Maivia (1937–1982), a blood brother to the Anoaʻi family, was also a professional wrestler, promoting a National Wrestling Alliance territory out of Hawaii and becoming a folk hero among the Samoan population of San Francisco. He is the grandfather of Dwayne "The Rock" Johnson, who posthumously inducted him into the WWE Hall of Fame in 2008.
- Jack Thompson (born 1956), "The Throwin' Samoan", was a backup quarterback for the Cincinnati Bengals and the first Samoan member of a team that made it to the NFL Super Bowl, in 1982, although Thompson did not play in that game.
- San Francisco 49ers nose tackle Manu Tuiasosopo (born 1957) was the first Samoan to play in a Super Bowl, in 1985.
- Cocoa Samoa (1945–2007) was a professional wrestler in the 1980s. He held several championship titles.
- Jonathan Fanene (born 1982) became the first NFL player to be appointed to a cabinet position in the American Samoa government in 2014.
- Olympic diver Greg Louganis (born 1960) was born in El Cajon, California, and is of Samoan and Swedish descent. His teenage biological parents placed him for adoption when he was eight months old and he was raised in California by his adoptive parents, Frances and Peter Louganis. His adoptive father was of Greek descent. Louganis reconnected with his biological father, Fouvale Lutu, in 1984. Through the help of DNA tests and his half-siblings, he found his biological mother in 2017.
