= Ronaldo Shani =

Greek footballer (born 2002)

Personal information
- Date of birth: 29 March 2002 (age 24)
- Place of birth: Greece
- Height: 1.82 m (6 ft 0 in)
- Position: Forward

Team information
- Current team: Ionikos

Youth career
- Atromitos Metamorfosis
- 2015–2018: Atromitos

Senior career*
Years	Team	Apps	(Gls)
2018–2022	Atromitos	0	(0)
2021–2022	→ Asteras Vlachioti (loan)	7	(0)
2022	Ypato		
2022–2023	SV Neuhof	13	(2)
2023	Thesprotos	11	(1)
2023–2024	Panelefsiniakos		
2024	Thyella Rafina		
2024–	Ionikos		

International career
2018	Greece U16	3	(1)
2018–2019	Greece U17	5	(0)
- * Club domestic league appearances and goals as of 9 October 2024

Ronaldo Shani (Greek: Ρονάλντο Σάνι; born 29 March 2002) is a Greek professional footballer who plays as a forward for Gamma Ethniki club Ionikos.

== Early life ==
Shani was born in Greece to Albanian parents.

== Club career ==
Having begun his career with Atromitos Metamorfosis, Shani joined the academy of professional side Atromitos at the age of thirteen. In November 2016 he went on trial with Italian side Atalanta. He marked his unofficial debut for Atromitos with a goal, scoring in a friendly against Panathinaikos on 12 September 2018. The following week he signed his first professional contract with the club.

Shani made his professional debut for Atromitos on 19 December 2018, coming on as a substitute for Theodoros Vasilakakis in an 8–0 win over Thyella Kamariou in the Greek Cup. In October 2019, he was named by English newspaper The Guardian on "Next Generation" list, highlighting the best players in the world born in 2002.

He was loaned to Super League Greece 2 side Asteras Vlachioti in August 2021, alongside teammate Fotis Zannis. Following seven appearances for the club, he returned to Atromitos, but moved immediately to Gamma Ethniki side Ypato on a free transfer. Later in the same year, he moved to Germany to join Hessenliga side SV Neuhof.

On his return to Greece in January 2023, he joined Thesprotos. After half a year with Thesprotos, he moved to Panelefsiniakos in September of the same year. This spell was also short, and in January 2024 he joined Thyella Rafina. After trialling with Amarynthiakos, he signed for Ionikos in September of the same year.

== International career ==
Eligible to represent Greece and Albania at international level, Shani rejected an approach from the Albanian Football Association in order to represent Greece. He went on to represent Greece at under-16 and under-17 level.

== Career statistics ==
=== Club ===
As of 27 August 2023

Appearances and goals by club, season and competition
Club	Season	League			Cup		Other		Total	
Club	Season	Division	Apps	Goals	Apps	Goals	Apps	Goals	Apps	Goals
Atromitos	2018–19	Super League Greece	0	0	1 (Note: Appearances in the Greek Cup)	0	0	0	1	0
Atromitos	2019–20	Super League Greece	0	0	0	0	0	0	0	0
Atromitos	2020–21	Super League Greece	0	0	0	0	0	0	0	0
Atromitos	2021–22	Super League Greece	0	0	0	0	0	0	0	0
Atromitos	Total		0	0	1	0	0	0	1	0
Asteras Vlachioti (loan)	2021–22	Super League Greece 2	7	0	1	0	0	0	8	0
SV Neuhof	2022–23	Hessenliga	13	2	0	0	0	0	13	2
Thesprotos	2022–23	Super League Greece 2	11	1	0	0	0	0	11	1
Career total			31	3	2	0	0	0	33	3
