= Ottoman Tobacco Company =

The Ottoman Tobacco Company (in Turkish: Memalik-i Şahane Duhanları Müşterekül Menfaa Reji Şirketi); also known as the Régie Company for its French official name Société de la régie co-intéressée des tabacs de l'Empire ottoman, was a parastatal company or Regie formed in the later Ottoman Empire by the Ottoman Public Debt Administration, with backing from a consortium of European banks. The company had a monopoly over tobacco production, and its revenue was intended to help overcome the Ottoman state's persistent shortage of income. The Ottoman Tobacco Company constituted the largest foreign investment in the Ottoman Empire, and it attempted to introduce more efficient production methods – against local resistance.

In 1881, the state monopoly on salt was incorporated into the Régie Company, which passed revenue from salt taxes (tuz resmi) to the Public Debt Commission. As the state (or a parallel state controlled by the government's creditors) now effectively controlled salt production and salt prices, salt smuggling became a problem. In 1884, the Ottoman government instituted a tobacco monopoly and delegated it to a partly foreign company, the “Regie co-intéressée des tabacs de l’Empire ottoman”, which relied on a consortium of European banks and on the Imperial Ottoman Bank, also listed in London and Paris. Founded in 1863, the latter brought together French shareholders supplementing initial contributions of British funds in 1856. Both had offices in Paris, place de la Bourse.

Under the Republic of Turkey, the Ottoman Tobacco Company was nationalised in 1925 and became Tekel, which was sold to British American Tobacco in 2008.

There are successor companies in other Ottoman successor states. To this day, the state-run tobacco monopolies in Lebanon and Syria are known as Régie.

== Kolcus ==
The Ottoman government controversially granted the company authority to establish its own armed security force, kolcus, in order to curb tobacco smuggling. With the delegation of law enforcement and the right to use force – fundamental powers of sovereignty – to a private corporation, critics of the Régie deemed it a state within a state.

Bloody clashes ensued between kolcus and the peasants and smugglers who derived their livelihoods from the tobacco fields. The practice of extrajudicial summary executions by kolcus severely damaged trust in the justice system. Many Greeks and Armenians were recruited as kolcus, and their operations against mainly Turkish peasantry fueled resentment. According to official records and testimonies, approximately 20,000 people lost their lives in conflicts involving Régie guards and smugglers between 1883 and 1925. The deep-seated animosity among the populace against kolcus, along with the disproportionate use of force, became the subject of numerous regional folk songs and laments, such as the Çökertme dance. With the nationalization of the Régie in 1925, the kolcus disappeared too.

== See also ==
- Ottoman Bank
