= Reinhold =

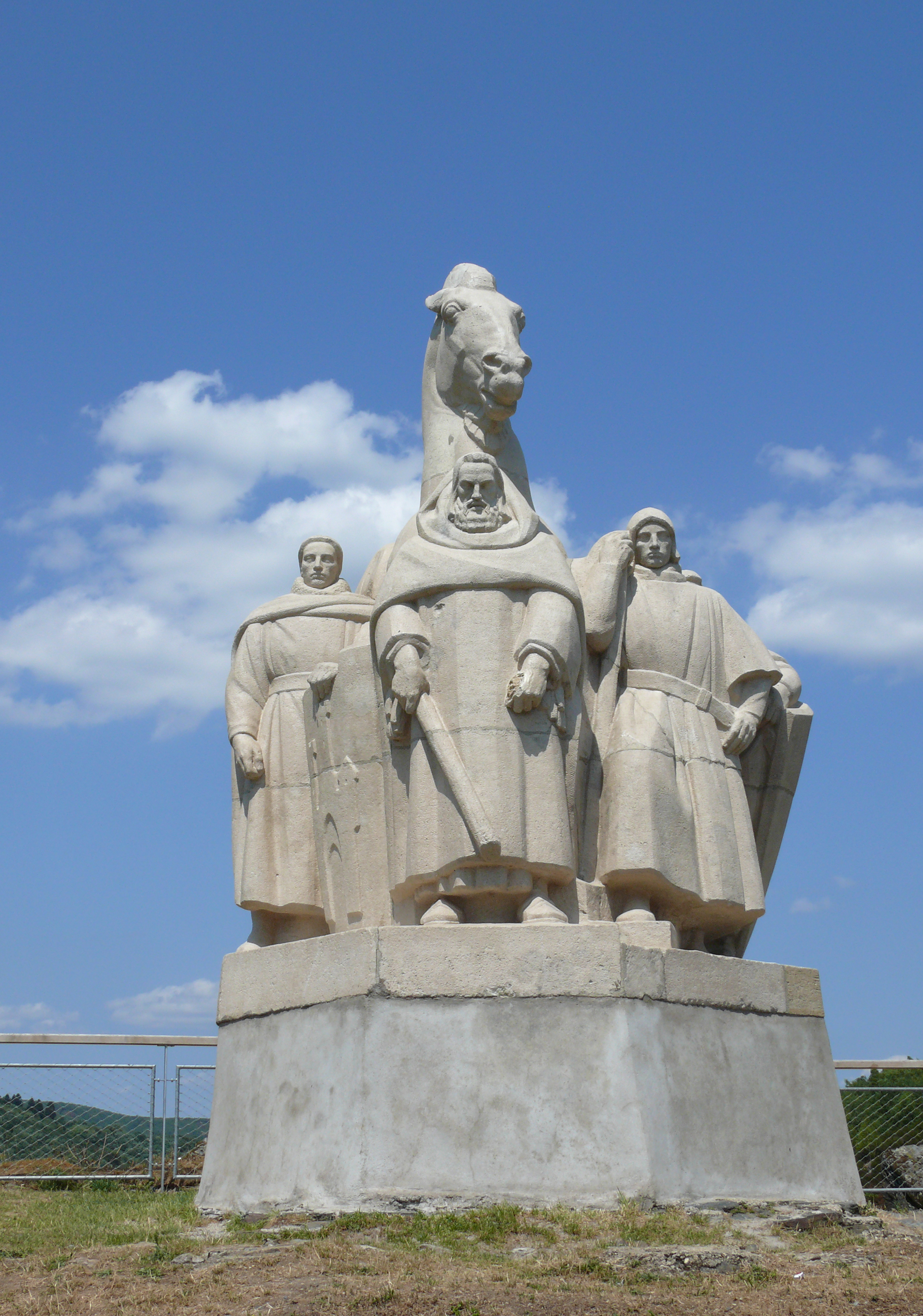
- Reinhold von Montalbaln Statue, located in Bogny-sur-Meuse
- Pronunciation: rine-holt
- Gender: Male
- Language: German

Origin
- Meaning: "solemnly loyal"
- Region of origin: Germany

Reinhold is a German, male given name, originally composed of two elements: *raginą ("decision, advice, counsel") and *waldaz ("ruler")—the second element having been reinterpreted as hold meaning "loyal" in the 16th century.

This name was popularised by the ancient German hero figure known as Reinhold von Meilan from The Dietrich Saga. As well as Reinhold von Montalban (The Four Sons of Aymon), who ultimately also became Saint Reinhold von Köln.

The -h- is recorded in the Dietrich von Bern legendary figure Reinholt van Meilan who was the only one spared the slaughter at Erminrich's castle due to his loyalty to Dietrich. Hence with the addition of the -h- the etymology is interpreted as the emphatic prefix regn- with hold, apparently meaning "solemnly loyal".

This name was brought to the British Isles by Viking conquerors, in the form of the Old Norse Rögnvaldr. In the 11th century, the Normans further established this name as Reinald and Reynaud. There are other spelling variations of this name, but all have the same etymological Germanic origin.

Cognate to English Reynold, Ronald, French Renault, Italian Rinaldo, Scandinavian Ragnvald, and Spanish Reynaldo.

== Notable people with the surname include ==
- Christa L. Deeleman-Reinhold (born 1930), Dutch arachnologist
- Erasmus Reinhold, 16th-century German astronomer; the lunar crater Reinhold is named after him
- Hagen Reinhold (born 1978), German politician
- Hugo Reinhold (1854–1935), Austrian composer and pianist
- Johann Heinrich Carl Reinhold (1788–1825), German painter and engraver
- Judge Reinhold (born 1957), American actor
- Karl Leonhard Reinhold (1757–1823), 18th-/19th-century Austrian philosopher
- Karolin Braunsberger-Reinhold (born 1986), German politician
- Meyer Reinhold (1909–2002), American classical scholar
- Ruth Reinhold (1902–1985), American pilot and flight instructor

== People with the given name include ==
- Reinhold Bocklet (1943–2025), German politician
- Reinhold Eckardt (1918–1942), German World War II fighter pilot
- Reinhold Einwallner (born 1973), Austrian politician
- Reinhold "Dan" Fielding, fictional character in the TV series Night Court
- Reinhold Glière (1875–1956), Russian and Soviet composer
- Reinhold Hanning (1921–2017) – Germany (Poland) – Auschwitz death camp SS guard
- Friedrich Reinhold Kreutzwald (1803–1882), Estonian writer
- Reinhold Lahti (1930–2002), Swedish Army major general
- Reinhold Messner (born 1944), Italian mountaineer
- Reinhold Mitterlehner (born 1955), Austrian politician
- Reinhold Niebuhr (1892–1971), American theologian, public intellectual, and commentator
- Reinhold Richard "Reince" Priebus (born 1972), American lawyer, former White House Chief of Staff for U.S. President Donald J. Trump
- Reinhold Remmert (1930–2016), German mathematician
- Reinhold Saulmann (1895–1936), Estonian Olympic sprinter
- Reinhold Thiessenhusen (1864–1930), American politician
- Reinhold Tiling (1893–1933), German engineer, pilot and rocket pioneer
- Reinhold Würth (born 1935), German businessman
- Reinhold Weege (1949–2012), American television writer, producer and director
