= Filip Ščrbec =

Croatian footballer

Filip Šćrbec
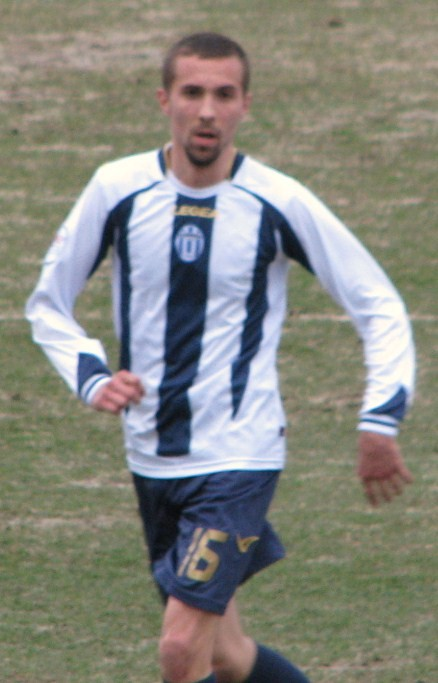

Personal information
- Full name: Filip Šćrbec
- Date of birth: 3 June 1991 (age 35)
- Place of birth: Zagreb, Croatia
- Height: 1.80 m (5 ft 11 in)
- Positions: Left midfielder; left back

Team information
- Current team: Vinogradar

Youth career
- 2000–2004: Dinamo Zagreb
- 2005: Hrvatski Dragovoljac
- 2005–2006: Dinamo Zagreb
- 2006–2009: NK Zagreb
- 2009: Dinamo Zagreb

Senior career*
Years	Team	Apps	(Gls)
2010–2011	Lokomotiva Zagreb	9	(0)
2010–2011	→ Rudeš (loan)	26	(3)
2011–2012	Inter Zaprešić	32	(3)
2013–2016	Rudeš	78	(7)
2016-	Vinogradar		

International career
2007	Croatia U-16	6	(1)
- * Club domestic league appearances and goals as of 29 October 2011

Filip Šćrbec (born 3 June 1991) is a Croatian football midfielder, currently playing for Vinogradar. His older brother Lovro Šćrbec plays for NK Lokomotiva Zagreb.

== Career ==
Šćrbec went through the youth ranks of NK Dinamo Zagreb until he moved with his brother Lovro to the youth team of NK Zagreb in 2006, playing several games for the Croatian U-16 national team in 2007. He was a part of the U-17 national team in 2008 but remained uncapped at that level. He returned to his former club in his last year as a junior team player, 2009, only to be sent to NK Lokomotiva Zagreb in January 2010, signing a stipend contract initially and then a 7-year professional contract in August 2010. Lokomotiva proceeded to send him on a season-long loan to the Druga HNL team NK Rudeš. In July 2011 his contract was mutually terminated and he moved to NK Inter Zaprešić.
