= Rolando =

Rolando may refer to:

== Entertainment ==
- Rolando, a 2008 puzzle-adventure video game
- Rolando 2: Quest for the Golden Orchid, a 2009 puzzle-adventure video game
- "Rolando", a song by Roland Kirk from the album Domino

== People ==
- Rolando (given name), a Spanish, Portuguese and Italian given name
- Rolando (footballer) (born 1985), Rolando Jorge Pires da Fonseca
- Gloria Rolando (born 1953), Cuban filmmaker and screenwriter
- Luigi Rolando (1773–1831), Italian anatomist

== Places ==
- Rolando, San Diego, US

== See also ==
- Central sulcus, originally called the "fissure of Rolando" or the "Rolandic fissure"
- Roland (disambiguation)
- Ronaldo (disambiguation)
