= Reinaldo =

Reinaldo is a Spanish and Portuguese language given name for males (the English form is Reynold). It may refer to:

== Football ==
- Reinaldo Merlo (born 1950), Argentine former footballer and manager
- Reinaldo Gomes (born 1954), Portuguese football striker born Maurício Zacarias Reinaldo Rodrigues Gomes
- Reinaldo (footballer, born 1953), Brazilian football forward born Reinaldo Francisco de Oliveira
- Reinaldo (footballer, born 1957), Brazilian football striker born José Reinaldo de Lima
- Reinaldo Felisbino (born 1962), Brazilian footballer better known as Lela
- Reinaldo (footballer, born 1965), Portuguese football forward born Reinaldo Almeida Lopes da Silva
- Reinaldo (footballer, born 1976), Brazilian football forward Reinaldo Rosa dos Santos
- Reinaldo (footballer, born 1979), Brazilian football forward born Reinaldo da Cruz Oliveira
- Reinaldo Gaúcho (born 1980), Brazilian football striker born Reinaldo de Morais Peres
- Reinaldo (footballer, born June 1980), Brazilian football striker born Reinaldo de Souza
- Reinaldo (footballer, born February 1980), Brazilian football forward born Reinaldo José da Silva
- Reinaldo (footballer, born 1984) (born 1984), Brazilian footballer born Reinaldo Elias da Costa
- Reinaldo Alagoano (born 1986), Brazilian football striker Reinaldo Gonçalves Félix
- Reinaldo (footballer, born 1989), Brazilian footballer born Reinaldo Manoel da Silva
- Reinaldo (footballer, born 2001), Brazilian football forward born Reinaldo Nascimento Satorno

== Other ==
- Reinaldo Arenas (1943–1990), Cuban poet, novelist and playwright
- José Reinaldo Tavares (born 1939), Brazilian politician
- Reinaldo Lizardi (born 1954), Venezuelan sprinter
- Reinaldo Patterson (born 1956), Cuban javelin thrower
