= Regie =

Regie or Régie (from the Latin regium: regal, royal) refers to a public or government establishment, administration, commission or management. They are also common first names in the Francophone world.

== Transport organisations ==
- Regia Autonomă de Transport București, public transport operator in Bucharest, Romania
- Regie voor Maritiem Transport, Belgian ferry company
- Régie Autonome des Transports Parisiens (RATP Group), public transport operator in Paris
- Régie Nationale des Usines Renault, organisation in Renault's corporate history
- Régie des Transports de Marseille, public transport operator in Marseille and its metropolis
- Régie du Chemin de Fer Abidjan-Niger, railway in west Africa
- Régie intermunicipale du canal de Soulanges, manages the Soulanges Canal
- Regie des Chemins de Fer, historic railway company in Morocco
- Régie des Chemins de fer du Mali, railway operator in Mali
- Régie des Chemins de Fer du Sénégal, railway operator in Senegal

== State monopolies ==
- Opiumregie, state Opium monopoly for the Dutch East Indies
- Opium Regie, state opium monopoly for French Indochina
- Régie d'exploitation industrielle du protectorat, water supplier in Morocco
- Regie Company, tobacco monopoly in the Ottoman Empire and in Ottoman successor states
- Régie du Tabac et des Allumettes, tobacco monopoly in Haiti
- Régie Française des Tabacs, tobacco monopoly in France

== Other organisations ==
- Régie Immobilière de la Ville de Paris (RIVP), housing agency in Paris
- Regideso, formerly Régie de distribution d'eau, water company in the Democratic Republic of the Congo
- Régie de l'énergie du Québec, Quebec's Energy Board
- Régie des alcools, des courses et des jeux, regulatory committee in Quebec
- Régie intermunicipale de police de la Rivière-du-Nord, police service absorbed into the Sûreté du Québec
- Régie des télécommunications du Québec, telecoms regulator in Quebec
- Régie du cinéma (Quebec), film rating agency in Quebec
- Régie de l'assurance maladie du Québec, government health insurance agency in Quebec
- Régie des Télegraphes et Téléphones, precursor of Belgacom
- Regie Autonome des Petroles, precursor of ERAP

== People ==
- Regie Baff (born 1949), American actress
- Regie Cabico, Filipino American poet
- Regie Hamm (born 1967), American singer-songwriter
- Regie Sahali-Generale, Filipino politician
- Regie Suganob (born 1997), Filipino professional boxer

== Other uses ==
- Short form of the name Regienald
- Regietheater, a theory of opera staging
- Regie Sathanas: A Tribute to Cernunnos, album by Belgian black metal band Enthroned
- Regie, Bucharest, neighborhood in Bucharest, Romania
- Stadionul Regie, stadium in Bucharest, Romania
- Some types of Octroi tax collection in France
