= Reginald =

- Romanization: Reginaldus
- Pronunciation: /ˈrɛ.dʒɪ.nəld/, REH-jih-nəld
- Gender: Male
- Language: English

Origin
- Languages: Germanic; Latin
- Origin: Latin: Reginaldus
- Derivation: ragin + wald
- Meaning: "advice", "counsel", "decision" + "rule", "ruler".
- Region of origin: England

Other names
- Variant form: Reginold
- Short form: Reg
- Pet name: Reggie
- Anglicisation: Reginald
- Related names: Reynold, Ragnall, Reinhold, Ronald, Rognvald
- See also: Rex, Regina

Reginald is a masculine given name in the English language that derives from the Latin word for "king".

== Etymology and history ==
The name Reginald comes from Latin meaning "king" and "ruler" symbolizing authority and leadership. It comes from combining Latin “rex” meaning king and “nald” meaning ruler. The name is derived from Reginaldus which means "king". This name signifies a ruler or kingly figure, representing authority and leadership. This Latin name is a Latinisation of a Germanic language name. The Germanic name is composed of two elements: the first ragin, meaning "advice", "counsel", "decision"; the second element is wald, meaning "rule", "ruler". The Old German form of the name is Raginald; Old French forms are Reinald and Reynaud.

Forms of this Germanic name were first brought to the British Isles by Scandinavians, in the form of the Old Norse Rögnvaldr. This name was later reinforced by the arrival of the Normans in the 11th century, in the Norman forms Reinald and Reynaud.

The Latin Reginaldus was used as a Latin form of cognate names, such as the Old Norse Rögnvaldr, and the Gaelic Ragnall and Raghnall.

== Translations ==
- Afrikaans: Ryno
- Ancient Germanic: Raginald, Reinald, Reinhold
- Ancient Scandinavian: Ragnvaldr
- Arabic: ريجنالد (Ryǧināld)
- Belarusian: Рэджынальд (Redžynaĺd)
- Bulgarian: Реджиналд (Redzhinald)
- Catalan: Renald
- Chinese: 雷金纳德 (Léijīnnàdé) (雷金納德)
- Danish: Ragnvald
- Dutch: Reinoud, Reinout
- Finnish: Reino
- Filipino: Regino
- French: Réginald, Renaud, Renoir, Renouard, Reynaud
- German: Reinhold
- Gujarati: રેજિનાલ્ડ (Rējinālḍa)
- Hebrew: רג'ינלד (Rejinald)
- Hindi: रेगीनाल्ड (Rēgīnālḍa)
- Icelandic: Rögnvaldur
- Irish: Raghnall
- Italian: Rinaldo
- Japanese: レジナルド (Rejinarudo)
- Kannada: ರೆಜಿನಾಲ್ಡ್ (Rejinālḍ)
- Korean: 레지날드 (Rejinaldeu)
- Latin: Reginaldus
- Macedonian: Реџиналд (Redžinald)
- Middle Irish: Ragnall
- Mongolian: Режиналд (Ryejinald)
- Norwegian: Ragnvald
- Old French: Reinald, Reynaud
- Old German: Raginald
- Old Irish: Ragnall
- Old Norse: Rögnvaldr
- Persian: رجینالد
- Polish: Reginald, Romuald
- Portuguese: Reginaldo, Reinaldo, Reynaldo, Ronaldo
- Punjabi: ਰੇਜਿਨਾਲਡ (Rējinālaḍa)
- Russian: Рогволод (Rogvolod)
- Scottish Gaelic: Raghnall
- Serbian: Региналд (Reginald)
- Spanish: Reinaldo, Reynaldo, Reginaldo, Regino
- Swedish: Ragnvald
- Tamil: ரெஜினால்டு (Rejiṉālṭu)
- Telugu: రెజినాల్డ్ (Rejinālḍ)
- Thai: เรจินัล (Recinạl)
- Ukrainian: Реджинальд (Redzhynalʹd)
- Welsh: Rheinallt
- Yiddish: רעגינאַלד (Reginald)

== Use and popularity ==
Today Reginald is regarded as a very formal name, and bearers generally shorten their name to Reg in ordinary usage. Reggie is a pet form of Reg.

== People with the name ==
=== Middle Ages ===
Ordered chronologically

- Reginald I, Count of Burgundy (986–1057), second Count of the Free County of Burgundy
- Reginald I, Count of Bar, Count of Bar (1105–1149)
- Reginald de Dunstanville, 1st Earl of Cornwall (c. 1110–1175), also High Sheriff of Devon
- Raynald of Châtillon (c. 1125–1187), also known as Reginald of Châtillon, a knight in the Second Crusade and Prince of Antioch
- Reginald of Sidon (1130s–1202), Count of Sidon and an important noble in the Kingdom of Jerusalem
- Reginald of Canterbury, medieval French writer c. 1200
- Reginald (bishop of the Isles) (died c. 1226)
- Reginald de Braose (1182–1228), Norman nobleman
- Raynald of Belleville (died 1241), Hungarian prelate
- Reginald of Piperno (c. 1230 – c. 1290), Italian Dominican, theologian and companion of St. Thomas Aquinas
- Reginald of Bar (bishop of Metz) (died 1316)
- Reginald of Burgundy (died 1321), Count of Montbéliard from 1282 to 1321
- Reginald II, Duke of Guelders (c. 1295–1343)

=== Modern world ===
- Reginald Arvizu (born 1969), American rock musician
- Reginald Askew (1928–2012), British Anglican priest and academic
- Reginald C. Barker (1881–1937), British-born American novelist
- Reginald Bonham, English blind chess player
- Reginald Bosanquet (1932–1984), British television newsreader best known for presenting News At Ten
- Reginald Denny (actor), English stage, film, and television actor
- Reginald Oliver Denny, the truck driver nearly beaten to death during the Los Angeles riots in 1992
- Elton John (born Reginald Kenneth Dwight), English singer
- Reginald Dyer (1864–1927), British-Indian army officer, mostly remembered for ordering the Jallianwala Bagh massacre in 1919.
- Reginald Earnshaw (1927–1941), believed to be the youngest person in the British services to have died in the Second World War
- Reginald Fessenden (1866–1932), inventor who conducted pioneering experiments in radio
- Reggie Fils-Aimé (born 1961), American businessman and former president/COO of Nintendo of America
- Reg Fleming (1936–2009), National Hockey League player
- Rex Harrison (1908–1990), English actor
- Reginald Goodridge (born 1952), Liberian politician
- Reginald Hill (1936–2012), British crime writer
- Reginald D. Hunter, American comedian, living and working in Britain
- Reggie Jackson (born 1946), former Major League Baseball player, member of the Baseball Hall of Fame
- Reg Keys, British anti-war campaigner and parliamentary candidate
- Reginald Knight (died 1969), Rhodesian politician and judge.
- Reginald Kray (1933–2000), one of the Kray twins, English criminals
- Reginald Lee (1870–1913), lookout stationed in the crow's nest of the RMS Titanic when the ship collided with an iceberg
- Reggie Miller (born 1965), former National Basketball Association player, member of the Basketball Hall of Fame
- Reginald Mitchell (1885–1937), British aeronautical engineer, designer of the Supermarine Spitfire
- Reginald Noble, best known as Redman
- Reginald Orton (1810–1862), British surgeon
- Reginald Owen (1887–1972), British character actor
- Reginald Perera (1915–1977), Sri Lankan Sinhala Trotskyist
- Reginald Pole (1500–1558), English Archbishop of Canterbury and cardinal
- Reginald Sydney Vernon Poulier (1894–1976), Sri Lankan Burgher civil servant
- Reginald Prentice (1923–2001), British politician
- Reginald Punnett (1875–1967), British geneticist
- Reg Saunders (1920–1990), Australian army officer
- Reginald Tennekoon, Sri Lankan Sinhala MP for Minipe
- Reg Varney (1916–2008), English actor, entertainer and comedian
- Reginald VelJohnson (born 1952), American actor
- Reggie White (1961–2004), American football player, member of both the College and Pro Football Halls of Fame
- Reginald Mengi, who was a Tanzanian Billionaire, and chairman of IPP companies
- Reginald (wrestler), professional wrestler and former acrobat

== Fictional characters ==
- Reginald, in Saki short stories
- Reginald, nemesis and cousin of Richie Rich in the movie and comic books
- Reginald Barclay, a recurring character in the Star Trek fictional universe
- Reginald Bunthorne, the main character of the Gilbert and Sullivan opera Patience
- Bushroot, Reginald Bushroot, supervillain in the Disney television series Darkwing Duck
- Reginald Deadman, police constable in the British television sitcom Goodnight Sweetheart
- Reggie Mantle, in Archie Comics
- Reginald Perrin, the main character of a series of novels by David Nobbs, and The Fall and Rise of Reginald Perrin, the popular BBC-commissioned 1970s comedy based upon it
- Reginald Jeeves, the personal servant to Bertie Wooster in a series of short stories and novels by P. G. Wodehouse
- Reginald "Reg" Hollis, a long-standing fictional police constable in the British television series The Bill
- Reginald "Bubbles" Cousins, in the American television series The Wire
- Reginald, a fictional koala in American Dad!, voiced by Erik Durbin
- Chief Inspector Reginald Wexford, the protagonist in a series of mysteries by Ruth Rendell
- General Reginald Peter Skarr, in Evil Con Carne and The Grim Adventures of Billy and Mandy
- Reginald "Belch" Huggins, a minor antagonist in Stephen King’s 1986 novel It
- Reginald "Red" Forman, in That '70s Show
- Reginald Roach, in the RoboRoach animated TV series
- Chief Superintendent Reginald Bright, in the Endeavour TV series
- Reginald Bane, a recurring character in Mysticons animated TV series
- Captain Reginald Thisleton, a World War I fighter pilot whom Woodhouse is heavily implied to have been lovers with in an episode of Archer
- King Reginald, the main antagonist of Dungeon Keeper 2
- Reginald, a lion in 64 Zoo Lane
