= Thomas Reynolds =

Thomas, Tom or Tommy Reynolds may refer to:

== Politics ==
- Thomas Reynolds (state representative) (1840–1919), member of the Wisconsin State Assembly
- Thomas Reynolds (Australian politician) (1818–1875), Premier of South Australia, 1860–1861
- Thomas Reynolds (governor) (1796–1844), governor of Missouri
- Thomas Reynolds II (born 1954), member of the Mississippi House of Representatives
- Thomas Caute Reynolds (1821–1887), Missouri's second Confederate governor
- Thomas J. Reynolds (1854-1896), American lawyer and politician in South Carolina who was African American
- Thomas G. Reynolds (born 1956), former member of the Wisconsin Senate
- Thomas M. Reynolds (born 1950), former congressman from the U.S. state of New York
- Tom Reynolds (Australian politician) (1936–2022), member of the Victorian Legislative Assembly

== Sportspeople ==
- Tom Reynolds (American football) (born 1949), American football wide receiver
- Tom Reynolds (footballer) (1917–2002), Australian footballer
- Tom Reynolds (soccer) (born 1955), retired American soccer goalkeeper
- Tommy Reynolds (footballer) (1922–1998), English footballer
- Tommie Reynolds (1941-2025), former Major League Baseball outfielder
- Tom Reynolds (sprinter) (born 2004), Australian athlete

== Other people ==
- Thomas Reynolds (bishop) (died 1560), English churchman and academic
- Thomas Reynolds (minister) (1752–1829), English antiquarian and minister
- Thomas Reynolds (priest) (1562–1642), English Reformation Catholic priest and martyr
- Thomas Reynolds (informer) (1771–1836), Irish informer
- Thomas Hedley Reynolds (1920–2009), president of Bates College, American historian
- Tom Reynolds (actor) (1866–1942), British actor
- Tom Reynolds (author) (born 1960), American author
- Tom Reynolds (EMT) (born 1971), pen name used by London Ambulance Service technician and author Brian Kellet
- Tommy Reynolds (musician) (1917–1986), American jazz clarinetist and bandleader
- Tommy Reynolds, multi-instrumentalist and vocalist with Hamilton, Joe Frank & Reynolds

== See also ==
- Thomas Reynold (disambiguation)
