= Louis-Antoine Ranvier =

French physician, pathologist, anatomist and histologist

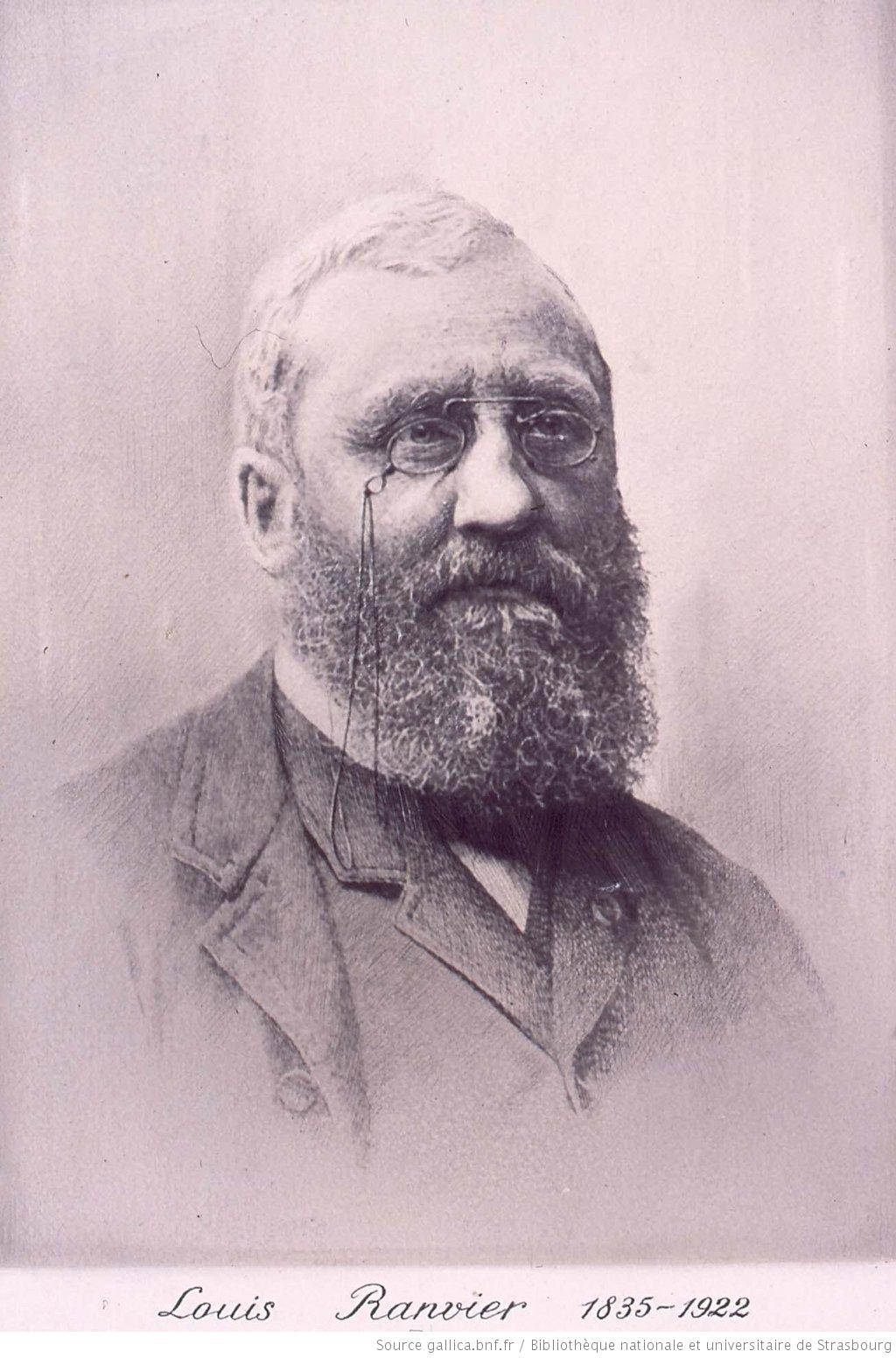
- Louis-Antoine Ranvier
- Born: 2 October 1835; Lyon
- Died: 22 March 1922 (aged 86); Vendranges, Loire, France
- Known for: nodes of Ranvier, Merkel-Ranvier cells
- Scientific career
- Fields: Histology
- Workplaces: Collège de France

Louis-Antoine Ranvier (2 October 1835 – 22 March 1922) was a French physician, pathologist, anatomist and histologist, who discovered the nodes of Ranvier, regularly spaced discontinuities of the myelin sheath, occurring at varying intervals along the length of a nerve fiber.

== Career ==
Ranvier was born and studied medicine at Lyon, graduating in 1865 from the Ecole Préparatoire de Médecine et de Pharmacie. He moved to Paris after receiving the internship of Parisian hospitals. Here he founded a small private research laboratory on Rue Christine along with fellow intern Victor André Cornil, and together they later offered a course in histology to medical students which involved the careful examination of tissues under a microscope. Their course was unique in the time as microscopy had not been viewed favourably in medicine especially by Henri Ducrotay de Blainville (1777-1850) and Auguste Comte (1798-1857). Their histology course material became an influential textbook on histopathology. In 1867, Ranvier entered the Collège de France and worked as an assistant to Claude Bernard. In 1875, he was appointed to its chair of general anatomy.

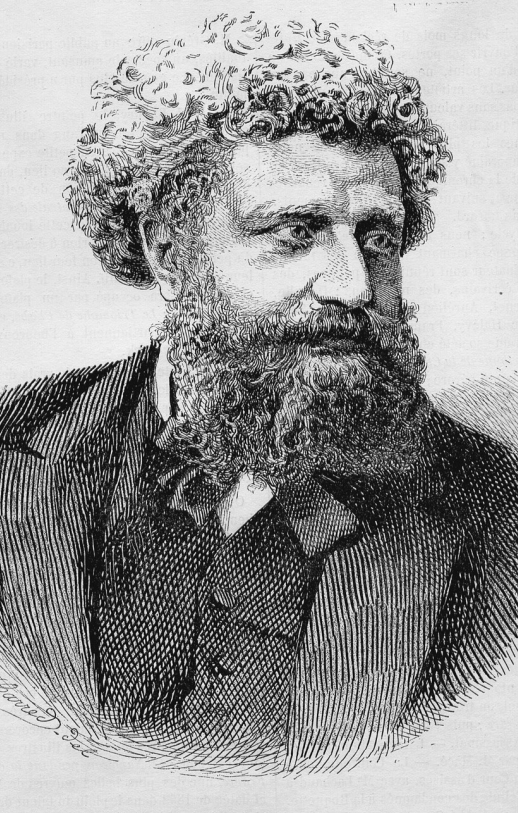
Ranvier, c. 1882

In 1878, Ranvier discovered the nodes along nerves which received his name. He conducted experiments on nerve growth, repair, and regeneration. Other anatomical structures bearing his name are the Merkel-Ranvier cells, melanocyte-like cells in the basal layer of the epidermis that contain catecholamine granules; and Ranvier's tactile disks, a special type of sensory nerve ending. In 1897, he founded the scientific journal Archives d'anatomie microscopique with Edouard-Gérard Balbiani. In 1897, Ranvier was named an honorary member of the American Association for Anatomy.

Some of his most notable students included Ferdinand-Jean Darier, Justin Marie Jolly, Joaquín Albarrán, Luis Simarro Lacabra, Joseph-Louis Renaut, and Fredrik Georg Gade.

== Retirement ==
Ranvier retired in 1900 to his estate in Thélys (Roanne) and died at Vendranges in 1922.

== Bibliography ==
- Ranvier, Louis-Antoine and Victor André Cornil. 1869. Manuel d'histologie pathologique. Paris
- Ranvier, Louis-Antoine. 1875–1882. Traité technique d'histologie. Paris: F. Savy
- Ranvier, Louis-Antoine. 1878. Leçons sur l'histologie du système nerveux, par M. L. Ranvier, recueillies par M.Ed. Weber. Paris
- Ranvier, Louis-Antoine. 1880. Leçons d'anatomie générale sur le système musculaire, par L. Ranvier, recueillies par M. J. Renaut. Paris
- Ranvier, Louis-Antoine. 1885. Exposé des titres et des travaux de M. L. Ranvier. Paris
