= Lucky (Lucky Twice song) =

Single by Lucky Twice

from the album Young & Clever
- Released: July 20, 2006
- Recorded: 2006
- Genre: Europop
- Length: 3:25
- Label: Vale; Catchy Tunes; Family Tree; Ultra
- Composer(s): Jonas von der Burg; Anoo Bhagavan; Niclas von der Burg
- Producer(s): Jonas von der Burg

Lucky Twice singles chronology
"Lucky" (2006)	"Hop Non Stop" (2007)

Music video
- "Lucky" on YouTube

"Lucky" is a song by Swedish pop duo, Lucky Twice. The song was released as the lead single of the duo first and only studio album Young & Clever on July 6, 2006. The song was first released in Spain, where it reached number one on the singles chart, and has performed strongly in other European countries, the only Lucky Twice song to do so.

== Background ==
The song was written by the trio of Jonas von der Burg, Anoo Bhagavan and Niclas von der Burg, and produced by Jonas.

The song was first released in Spain on July 6, 2006. A remix EP was released on September 26, 2006 by Catchy Tunes and Family Tree Records, while another remix EP was released on December 5, 2006 along with Ultra Records. A release for the United Kingdom was planned but plans fell off following some record label complications.

The song saw an international resurgence in 2021 after becoming popular on TikTok. This was followed by two remixes released the following year: a "TikTok Edit" with groups Crystal Rock and Anastasia Rose, and a remix titled "Lucky (I'm So Lucky Lucky)", which is a speed up version of the track, resembling the nightcore remixes of internet.

== Music video ==
A music video for the song was filmed and released in 2006. It follows Hannah Reynold and former member Sofie Larsson walking and singing in a field, with some shots being done at night. The duo appears dressed in different types of clothes, representing a different period of time.

The video was uploaded to the official Lucky Twice YouTube account on February 8, 2022, a decade after its release. A sped up version of the video for the "I'm So Lucky Lucky" remix was later posted on October 17, 2022.

The version used in the music video features vocals of former member Sofie Larsson, as it is the original version released in Spain before the album was re-recorded with Emelie Schytz for the international releases. Due to this, the video for the "I'm So Lucky Lucky" remix features Larsson with the voice of Schytz.

== Track listings ==
- Scandinavia and Spain CD single
1. "Lucky" (Radio Edit) (3:26)
2. "Lucky" (Extended) (5:22)
3. "Lucky" (Hot Stuff Mix Short) (4:02)
4. "Lucky" (Hot Stuff Mix Long) (5:23)
- US CD single
1. "Lucky" (Radio Edit) (3:26)
2. "Lucky" (Hot Stuff Mix Short) (4:04)
3. "Lucky" (Extended) (5:24)
- Germany, Austria & Switzerland Digital single
1. "Lucky" (Radio Edit) (3:23)
2. "Lucky" (Extended) (5:20)
3. "Lucky" (Hot Stuff Mix Short) (4:00)
4. "Lucky" (Hot Stuff Mix Long) (5:20)
5. "Lucky" (Karaoke Version) (3:23)
6. "Lucky" (Europeanz Remix) (7:02)
- France CD single
1. "Lucky" (Radio Edit) (3:24)
2. "Lucky" (Hot Stuff Mix Short) (4:01)
3. "Lucky" (DJ Tora Remix) (4:31)
4. "Lucky" (Extended) (5:21)
5. "Lucky" (Hot Stuff Mix Long) (5:21)
- TikTok Edit
1. "Lucky" (TikTok Edit) (2:03)
- I'm So Lucky Lucky Remix
1. "Lucky (I'm So Lucky Lucky)" (Remix) (3:00)

== Charts ==
Chart (2006–2007)	Peak position
Austria (Ö3 Austria Top 40)	42
Denmark (Tracklisten)	5
Finland (Suomen virallinen lista)	17
France (SNEP)	8
Germany (Official German Charts)	41
Spain (PROMUSICAE)	1
Sweden (Sverigetopplistan)	43
