= Rinalds =

Rinalds is a Latvian given name. It is a cognate of Rǫgnvaldr. Individuals with this name include:

- Rinalds Grants (born 1974), Latvian Lutheran bishop
- Rinalds Sirsniņš (born 1985), Latvian basketball player
