= Reggie Walker =

Reggie Walker may refer to:

- Reggie Walker (sprinter) (1889–1951), South African track and field athlete
- Reggie Walker (linebacker, born 1986) (born 1986), American football player
- Reggie Walker (linebacker, born 1996) (born 1996), American football player
