= Reynaldo =

Reynaldo is a Spanish given name from the German name Reinhold. Notable people with the name include:

- Reynaldo Aguado Montealegre (born 1960), Nicaraguan activist
- Reynaldo Aimonetti (born 1943), Argentine footballer
- Reynaldo Anderson (born 1986), Panamanian footballer
- Reynaldo Bignone (1928–2018), former Argentinian president
- Reynaldo Brown (born 1950), American track and field athlete
- Reynaldo Clavasquín (born 1972), Honduran footballer
- Reynaldo Dagsa (1975–2011), Filipino politician
- Reynaldo Dante (1912–1985), Filipino actor
- Reynaldo Díaz (born 1991), Mexican footballer
- Reynaldo G. Evangelista (born 1960), Filipino Roman Catholic bishop
- Reynaldo Garcia (born 1974), Dominican baseball pitcher
- Reynaldo Gianecchini (born 1972), Brazilian actor
- Reynaldo González López (1948–2015), Cuban sportsperson and former member of the International Olympic Committee
- Reynaldo Antonio Hernández (born 1984), Salvadoran footballer
- Reynaldo Hahn (1874–1947), Venezuelan-born French musician
- Reynaldo Hill (born 1982), American football player
- Reynaldo López (born 1994), Dominican baseball pitcher
- Reynaldo Martinez, American politician
- Reynaldo (footballer, born 1997) (Reynaldo Cesar Moraes), Brazilian footballer
- Reynaldo Parks (born 1974), Costa Rican footballer
- Reynaldo Patiño, Salvadoran swimmer
- Reynaldo Pineda (born 1978), Honduran footballer
- Reynaldo (footballer, born 1989) (Reynaldo dos Santos Silva), Brazilian footballer
- Reynaldo Rodríguez (born 1986), Colombian baseball player
- Reynaldo Sietecase (born 1961), Argentine journalist
- Reynaldo Tilguath (born 1979), Honduran footballer
- Reynaldo Young (born 1966), Uruguayan musician
