= Ronaldão =

Ronaldão can refer to:

- Ronaldão (footballer) (born 1965), Brazilian footballer
- Ronaldão (stadium), a football stadium in Poços de Caldas, Brazil
