= Ronald Russell =

Ronald Russell may refer to:

- Ronald Russell (British politician) (1904–1974), British journalist, author and politician
- Ronald B. Russell, American politician
- Ronald G. Russell, American lawyer and failed judicial appointment
- Ronald Russell (athlete) (1954–2026), American sprinter
- Ron Russell (1926–2019), Canadian politician and pilot

== See also ==
- Ronald King (Ronald Russell King, 1909–1988), New Zealand rugby union player
- R. R. Reno (Russell Ronald Reno, (born 1959), American professor
- Landon Ronald (Landon Ronald Russell, 1873–1938), English conductor, composer, pianist, teacher
