= Renald =

Renald is a given name. Notable people with the name include:

- Renald Castillon, French motorcycle racer
- Rénald Metelus (born 1993), French footballer
- Renald Knysh (1931–2019), Soviet and Belarusian coach in artistic gymnastics coach
- Jean Rénald Clérismé (1937–2013), Haitian politician and priest
