= Ronaldo (footballer, born 1977) =

Brazilian footballer

Personal information
- Full name: Ronaldo Pereira Alves
- Date of birth: 16 November 1977 (age 48)
- Place of birth: Goioerê, Brazil
- Height: 1.85 m (6 ft 1 in)
- Position: Defender

Senior career*
Years	Team	Apps	(Gls)
1998–2003	Internacional	54	(2)
2004–2005	Criciúma	27	(1)
2006	Chapecoense		
2007	Veranópolis		
2008	Uberaba		
2008	Cruzeiro-RS		
2009	Iguaçu		
2009–2011	Ypiranga-RS		
2011	Três Passos		
- * Club domestic league appearances and goals

Ronaldo Pereira Alves (born 16 November 1977), commonly known as Ronaldo, is a former Brazilian footballer.

== Career statistics ==
=== Club ===
Club	Season	League			State League		Cup		Other		Total	
Club	Season	Division	Apps	Goals	Apps	Goals	Apps	Goals	Apps	Goals	Apps	Goals
Internacional	1999	Série A	5	0	0	0	0	0	0	0	5	0
Internacional	2000	Série A	24	2	0	0	0	0	0	0	24	2
Internacional	2001	Série A	9	0	0	0	0	0	0	0	9	0
Internacional	2002	Série A	16	0	0	0	0	0	0	0	16	0
Internacional	Total		54	2	0	0	0	0	0	0	54	2
Criciúma	2004	Série A	27	1	0	0	0	0	0	0	27	1
Ypiranga-RS	2010	–			9 (Note: Appearances in the Campeonato Gaúcho)	0	0	0	0	0	9	0
Career total			81	3	9	0	0	0	0	0	90	3
