= Renaldo Samsara =

Indonesian-English screenwriter

- Samsara in 2012
- Born: Asturias Renaldo Crawfurd; 19 November 1988 (age 37); Jakarta, Indonesia
- Education: Nanyang Academy of Fine Arts
- Occupations: Screenwriter, film director, film editor, producer
- Years active: 2008–present

Renaldo Samsara (born Asturias Renaldo Crawfurd, 19 November 1988) is an Indonesian-English screenwriter, film director, film editor and indie music producer.

Samsara made his directorial debut, Persepsi, with Matthew Hart, the guitarist of Arkarna, during their meeting and music collaboration in 2016. The film stars Nino Fernandez, Nadine Alexandra, Hannah Al Rashid, Irwansyah and many others.

== Early life and education ==
Samsara was born on 19 November 1988, in Jakarta. His father, Anthony, was of Jewish-Indonesian descent from North Sumatra, and his mother, Cynthia, is of Scottish-Borneo descent. Samsara attended Nanyang Academy of Fine Arts and SAE Institute Singapore at the age of 15, before moving back to Jakarta as an adult.

== Filmography ==
=== Film ===
Year	Title	Producer	Director	Writer	Notes
2016	I am Hope	No	No	Yes	
2016	Persepsi	Yes	Yes	Yes	Also credited as Editor with Glen Baldin.
2018	Cinta Itu Buta (Love is Blind)	No	No	Yes	
2021	Persepsi (50 mins Ver.)	Yes	Yes	Yes	
2023	Golgotha (Working Title)	Yes	Yes	Yes	
2024	Box (Working Title)	No	Yes	Yes	
