= Renaud de Pons =

Renaud de Pons may refer to:

- Renaud I de Pons (fl. 1070s)
- Renaud de Pons, Seneschal of Gascony (d. aft. 1228)
- Renaud II de Pons (d. 1252)
- Renaud III de Pons (d. 1272)
- Renaud IV de Pons (d. aft. 1308)
- Hélie-Rudel II de Pons, also called Renaud (d. 1334)
- Renaud IV de Pons, Viscount of Carlat (d. 1356)
- Renaud V de Pons (d. 1356)
- Renaud VI de Pons (d. 1427)
- Renaud VII de Pons (d. 1396)

== See also ==
- Rainaut de Pons, troubadour
