= Lucky Twice =

Swedish Eurodance band

- Origin: Sweden
- Genres: Eurodance
- Years active: 2006–2010
- Label: Family Tree Music
- Past members: Hannah Reynold; Emelie Schytz; Sofie Larsson (left early on)

Lucky Twice were a Swedish pop music duo consisting of Hannah Reynold (born July 18, 1991) and Emelie Schytz (born October 28, 1991). They were signed to Family Tree Music in Sweden.

== History ==
Their first single, "Lucky", was released in Spain on 20 July 2006 through Vale Music. It went to number 1 in the singles chart and was certified double platinum. Their album Young & Clever was released in June 2007 and was followed on 23 July by the single "Hop Non Stop".

"Lucky" also hit the charts in Denmark (# 5), France (# 8), Finland (# 17), Germany (# 41), Austria (# 42) and Sweden (# 43). Despite some video rotation, press interest and a performance at G-A-Y in London, the release of the CD single was cancelled in the United Kingdom after some record label complications. The song has reached a cult-like status within UK bars and nightclubs.

Originally, Lucky Twice consisted of Hannah Reynold and Sofie Larsson. However, in 2007, Larsson left Lucky Twice to join the Twisters, a band she formed with her brother. Larsson was replaced by Schytz soon after, and Lucky Twice rerecorded their old material with Schytz, as well as some new songs. A new version of the album Young & Clever, which had only previously released in Spain when the album featured Sofie, was announced on their website to release in Poland and in Asia in 2008 with Lucky Twice already appearing in Poland to promote "Lucky" there. In 2009, Lucky Twice was due to release their next single and first single off a planned second album called "Love Song"; however, the single was cancelled due to disagreements on the single between the members and the label.

In early 2010, Lucky Twice decided to split up. Since then, a rough, incomplete demo of "Love Song" has leaked online, followed by the leak of the full music video later on. After the original posting of the music video was deleted, Schytz herself later posted the full music video for "Love Song" to her YouTube channel as a gift to the fans.

As of 2015, Young & Clever has been released to digital stores internationally. The version released was the new version of the album featuring Schytz.

== Discography ==
=== Albums ===
- Young & Clever (2007)

=== Singles ===
Year	Title	Chart positions						
Year	Title	SPA	FIN	AU	GER	SWE	FR	DK
2006	"Lucky"	1	17	42	41	43	8	5
2007	"Hop Non Stop"	20	—	—	—	—	—	—
2007	"The Lucky Twice Song"	24	—	—	—	—	—	—

==== Unreleased ====
- "Love Song" was a song recorded by Lucky Twice and planned for a 2009 release as the first single off their second album. It would have been the first release to feature new member Emelie Schytz. Behind the scenes photos of the music video filming were shared to their MySpace and Scandipop shared the news and reviewed an mp3 of the songs sent to them. However, the single was delayed without an announcement. In May 2010, an edited clip of the music video for "Love Song" was leaked as a "banned video" and in July, the song was partially leaked with rough audio by a mysterious account called Lucky Twice Fans. Around the same time Lucky Twice's disbandment was officially revealed, Emelie Schytz uploaded the full "Love Song" video in HQ for the fans.
