= Reginald C. Barker =

British-born American novelist (1881–1937)

- Born: 15 May 1881; Brighton, Sussex, England
- Died: 21 October 1937 (aged 56); Los Angeles, California
- Citizenship: United States
- Occupation: Author
- Spouse: Edith Granger (m. 1911–1937)
- Children: 3
- Writing career
- Pen name: Lee Harrington
- Years active: c. 1900–1937
- Genres: Western

Reginald Charles Barker (15 May 1881 – 20 October 1937) was a British-born American novelist. He wrote mainly Western stories, and was published in Blue Book, Western Story Magazine, and Complete Stories, among others. Barker sometimes wrote under the pen-name Lee Harrington. Born and raised in England, Barker came to America in 1900 and became a naturalized citizen in 1923. In 1911, he married Edith Granger, who was from Idaho, and they subsequently had three children, one of whom predeceased Barker.

His story Chuck of the Bar V was adapted into the 1924 film Biff Bang Buddy.
