= Raynaud =

Raynaud or Reynaud is a surname. Notable people with the surname include:

- Aimé Reynaud (1808–1876), French naval officer
- Alexis Raynaud (born 1994), French sport shooter
- Alix Raynaud (born 1974), French executive producer and line producer
- André Raynaud (1904–1937), French cyclist
- Cecile Reynaud, volleyball player
- Émile Reynaud (1844–1918), animator and inventor
- Charles Ceccaldi-Raynaud (born 1925), French politician
- Colette Reynaud (1872–1965), French feminist, socialist and pacifist journalist
- Darius Reynaud (born 1985), American football player
- Fernand Raynaud (1926–1973), stand-up comic
- Jean Reynaud (1806–1863), philosopher
- Jordy Mont-Reynaud (born 1983), chess master
- Joëlle Ceccaldi-Raynaud (born 1951), politician
- Louis Raynaud, dit Blanchard (1789–1868), politician
- Marie-Line Reynaud (born 1954), politician
- Maurice Raynaud (1834–1881), doctor, discovered Raynaud syndrome
- Maxime Raynaud (born 2003), French basketball player
- Michel Raynaud, (1938–2018), mathematician
- Michèle Raynaud, (born 1938), mathematician
- Paul Reynaud (1878–1966), politician
- Raynald of Châtillon (1125–1187), knight
- Regnaud de La Porte (Raynaud) (died 1325), bishop and Cardinal
- Romain Reynaud (born 1983), Association football player
- Serge Raynaud de la Ferriere (1916–1962), philosopher
- Stéphane Reynaud, chef and cookery writer
- Théophile Raynaud (1583–1663), theologian
- Yelda Reynaud (born 1972), actress

== See also ==
- Alain Raynaud, Bordeaux winemaker of Château Quinault
- François Dominique de Reynaud, Comte de Montlosier (1755–1838), politician
- Raynaud surface, type of algebraic surface
- Raynaud syndrome
- Raynaud's isogeny theorem
- Rey Robinson (born 1952), athlete
- Reynaud Des Marchais, Chevalier des Marchais, cartographer
