= Reggie Johnson =

Reggie Johnson may refer to:

- Reggie Johnson (musician) (1940–2020), American jazz double bassist
- Reggie Johnson (basketball, born 1957), American basketball player for the University of Tennessee
- Reggie Johnson (boxer) (born 1966), American boxer
- Reggie Johnson (American football) (born 1968), American football player
- Reggie Johnson (basketball, born 1989), American basketball player for the University of Miami
