= Ronaldo Cadeu =

Brazilian composer, conductor and classical guitarist

Ronaldo Cadeu (born 3 November 1977) is a Brazilian composer, conductor and classical guitarist.

In his early career, Cadeu won four important awards in Brazil, both as composer and classical guitar soloist. In 2000 he was awarded 3rd prize at the A Symphony for the 500 Years ( Sinfonia dos 500 Anos). This competition was promoted by Recife City as part of the celebrations of Brazil's 500th anniversary. Cadeu's Symphony no. 1, Op. 7 had its World Premiere in 2000 performed by Recife City Symphony Orchestra (Orquestra Sinfônica do Recife). In 2004 Cadeu won 1st prize in another national composition competition sponsored by Brazilian BDMG Bank (Minas Gerais State Developing Bank). His Symphony no. 2 was premiered by Minas Gerais State Symphony Orchestra (Orquestra Sinfônica de Minas Gerais) and later in 2006 was performed by Orquestra Petrobrás Sinfônica, directed by Isaac Karabtchesvsky at Sala Cecília Meirelles in Rio de Janeiro.
