= Ranald Roderick Macdonald =

British mathematician and psychologist

- Born: 1945; Aberdeen
- Died: 2007 (aged 61–62); Stirling
- Known for: significance testing
- Scientific career
- Fields: Mathematical psychology

Ranald Roderick Macdonald (1945–2007) was a British mathematician and psychologist. He was known for his contribution to the foundations of significance testing.
