= Regina Washington =

American public health professional and activist

- Education: Bachelor of Science in Biology Masters in Education in Health Sciences Doctorate in Public Health
- Awards: Lyman T Johnson Torch of Excellence Award

Regina R. Washington is an American public health professional, activist, and researcher who has dedicated her career to closing health gaps among marginalized and underrepresented groups in the state of Kentucky. Washington is Director of LGBT HealthLink, an organization which promotes tobacco control, cancer prevention and public health equity activities. As a public health professional, she has become an advocate for reducing LGBT smoking and cancer rates. Washington was the first black student to graduate with a Doctor of Public Health (DrPH) degree from the University of Kentucky when she graduated in 2006.

== Early life and education ==
Regina Washington grew up in Martinsburg, West Virginia, with a family that prioritized education and work. Washington attended Berea College and earned a Bachelor of Science in biology. She attended Eastern Kentucky University, where she graduated with a master's in education in health sciences. After that, she received her Doctorate in Public Health (DrPH) from the University of Kentucky College of Public Health in 2006, becoming the first African American to be awarded this title by the school.

== Career ==
Following her doctorate, Washington pursued a career in public health improvement, with a special interest in cancer research and health disparities. She began her career in cancer research at the University of Kentucky and the National Cancer Institute (NCI) in Bethesda, Maryland. Washington worked as an educator, giving public health and wellness courses at South College School of Pharmacy. She has also led several programs to combat health disparities, including efforts to eliminate the over-representation of black women in breast and cervical cancer. Washington is now the Director of LGBT HealthLink. She is dedicated to fighting tobacco and cancer health inequality in LGBT communities as part of her position.

== Impact ==
Smoking awareness, cancer control, and health equity remain the hallmarks of Washington's public health legacy. Her role in fighting health inequalities in the LGBT/minority population has helped to extend the inclusion of diversity into public health policies and practices.

== Awards and honors ==
Washington won the Lyman T Johnson Torch of Excellence Award in 2022 for her many contributions to education and health equity. Additionally, Washington has also completed the Health Policy CERTA Fellowship at the National Cancer Institute, and she was named a Public Health Leadership Scholar by the University of North Carolina Chapel Hill.
