= Lovro Šćrbec =

Croatian footballer

Lovro Ščrbec
Personal information
- Full name: Lovro Ščrbec
- Date of birth: 30 January 1990 (age 36)
- Place of birth: Zagreb, SR Croatia, SFR Yugoslavia
- Height: 1.77 m (5 ft 10 in)
- Position: Forward

Team information
- Current team: NK Lukavec

Youth career
- 1999–2006: Dinamo Zagreb
- 2006–2008: Zagreb
- 2008–2009: Nacional

Senior career*
Years	Team	Apps	(Gls)
2008–2009	Nacional	0	(0)
2009–2011	Rudeš	37	(14)
2011–2012	Lokomotiva	11	(1)
2012–2013	Gorica	25	(8)
2013–2016	Rudeš	84	(9)
2016–2017	Vinogradar		
2017	SV Buch/St. Magdalena	13	(9)
2017–2019	SC Kemeten	38	(20)
2019	Zelina		
2019–	NK Lukavec		

International career
2005	Croatia U-15	2	(0)
2005–2006	Croatia U-16	10	(2)
2006	Croatia U-17	8	(3)
2008	Croatia U-18	4	(0)
- * Club domestic league appearances and goals as of 26 October 2016

Lovro Ščrbec (born 30 January 1990) is a Croatian football forward, currently playing for NK Lukavec.

== Club career ==
Lovro Ščrbec was one of the best players in Croatian U-18 national team. In the 2006–07 season with cadets team of NK Zagreb he was Champion of Croatia. Thanks to his excellent season in Croatian Cadets Championship together with his younger brother Filip Šćrbec he was invited in training center of Italian football giant Milan, where he has had successful trial (test games), but because of problems for getting EU visa for younger than 18 years, he had to return to Croatia. He later had a spell in the Austrian lower leagues.

== Personal life ==
His younger brother Filip plays for Vinogradar.
