= Reginaldo =

Reginaldo may refer to:

- Maicosuel Reginaldo de Matos (born 1986), footballer
- Reginaldo Araújo (born 1977), Brazilian defender
- Reginaldo de Santana (born 1975), Brazilian football player
- Reginaldo (footballer born 1983) full name Reginaldo Ferreira da Silva, Brazilian football striker
- Reginaldo (footballer, born 1993), Brazilian football right-back
- Piá (footballer born 1973), full name Reginaldo Revelino Jandoso (born 1973), Brazilian football midfielder
