= Thomas Reynold =

Thomas Reynold may refer to:

- Thomas Reynolds (bishop) or Reynold
- Thomas Reynold (MP) for Leominster

== See also ==
- Thomas Reynolds (disambiguation)
