= Ronald =

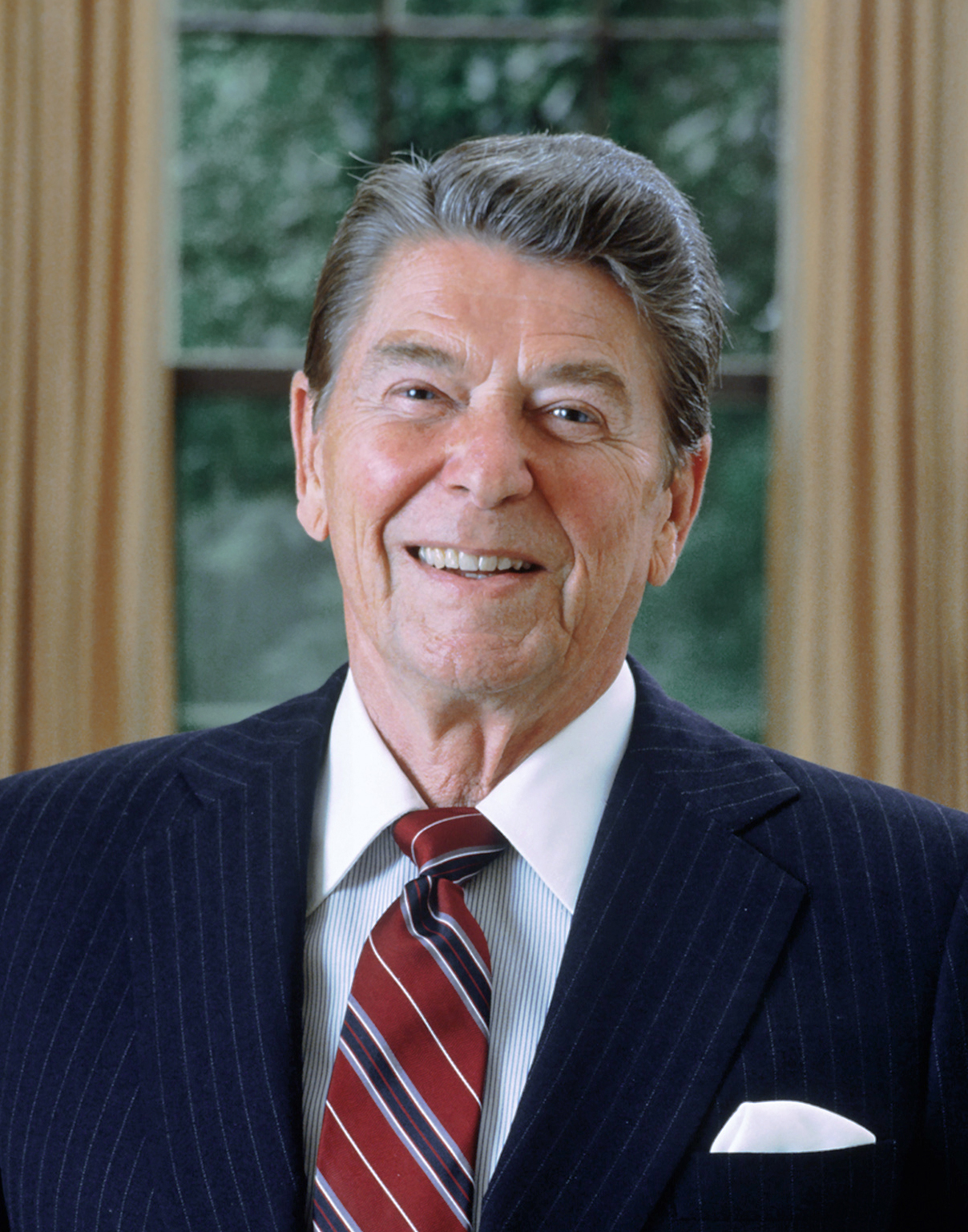
- President Ronald Reagan, pictured in 1985.
- Pronunciation: /ˈrɒnəld/
- Gender: Male
- Language: English

Origin
- Languages: Old Norse, Old English
- Origin: Rögnvaldr, Regenweald
- Derivation: regin + valdr or regen + weald
- Meaning: "advice" "decision" "ruler"

Other names
- Short form: Ron
- Pet names: Roni, Ronnie, Ronny
- Related names: Ragnall, Ronalda, Rhona, Ronaldo, Reynold, Rainald, Renaud, Reinhold, Reginald, Rognvald, Reynolds

Ronald is a masculine given name derived from the Old Norse Rögnvaldr, or possibly from Old English Regenweald. In some cases Ronald is an Anglicised form of the Gaelic Raghnall, a name likewise derived from Rögnvaldr. The latter name is composed of the Old Norse elements regin ("advice", "decision") and valdr ("ruler"). Ronald was originally used in England and Scotland, where Scandinavian influences were once substantial, although now the name is common throughout the English-speaking world. A short form of Ronald is Ron. Pet forms of Ronald include Roni and Ronnie. Ronalda and Rhonda are feminine forms of Ronald. Rhona, a modern name apparently only dating back to the late nineteenth century, may have originated as a feminine form of Ronald. The names Renaud/Renault and Reynold/Reinhold are cognates from French and German respectively. The name Ronaldo is a cognate from Spanish and Portuguese.

== People with the name ==
- Ronald I of Buganda
- Ronald Acuña Jr., Venezuelan baseball player
- Ronald Alcock (died 1991), British stamp dealer and philatelic speaker
- Ronald Alley (1926–1999), British art historian and curator
- Ronalds Arājs, Latvian athlete
- Ronald Arculli, former chairman of Hong Kong Exchanges and Clearing
- Ronald Azuma, American computer scientist
- Ronald Bandell (1946–2015), Dutch mayor
- Ronald Bell (musician) (1951–2020), American saxophonist with Kool and the Gang
- Sir Ronald Bell (1914–1982), British Conservative Member of Parliament
- Ronald Boisvert, American politician
- Ronald Breslow (1931–2017), American chemist
- Ronald Burkle, American businessman
- Ronald Castree, British child murderer
- Ronald Cerritos, Salvadoran footballer
- Ronald Cheng, Hong Kong pop star and movie actor
- Ronalds Cinks, Latvian ice hockey player
- Ronald D. Coleman, American politician
- Ronald Colman, English actor
- Ronald de Boer, Dutch football (soccer) player
- Ronald DeFeo Jr, American mass murderer and family annihilator
- Ronald dela Rosa (born 1962), Filipino politician and retired police general
- Ronald Fielding Dodd (c.1890–1958), Scottish architect
- Ronald Dominique (born 1964), prolific American serial killer and rapist
- Ronald Dupree, American baseball player
- Ronald Duncombe, Bahamian politician
- Ronald Evans (1933–1990), American astronaut
- Ronald Ferguson (polo), father of Sarah, Duchess of York
- Ronald Ferguson (economist), American researcher of the racial education achievement gap
- Ronald Fisher (1890–1962), British statistician and geneticist
- Ronald Fletcher (1910–1996), English radio announcer and newsreader
- Ronald Florijn, Dutch rower
- Ronald J. Garan, Jr., American astronaut
- Ronald Girones, Cuban judoka
- Ronald Gora, American swimmer
- Ronald Graham (1935–2020), American mathematician
- Ronald Green (1944–2012), American-Israeli basketball player
- Ronald McNeill, 1st Baron Cushendun, British Conservative politician
- Ronald Max Hartwell, Australian historian
- Ronald Harvey (cricketer), English cricketer
- Ronald A. Heifetz, co-founder of the Center for Public Leadership at John F. Kennedy School of Government, Harvard University
- Ronald K. Hoeflin, American philosopher
- Ronald Isley, R&B singer
- Ronald M. James, American folklorist and historian
- Ronald Jones (running back) (born 1997), American football player
- Ronald Joseph (disambiguation), several people
- Ronald Kapaz, Brazilian graphic designer
- Ronalds Ķēniņš, Latvian ice hockey player
- Ronald Kent Jr. (born 1999), American football player
- Ronald Klink, Democratic politician and former United States Representative from Pennsylvania
- Ronald Koeman, Dutch football (soccer) player and coach
- Ronald Kray, English gangster
- Ronald Lacey (1935–1991), British actor
- Ronald Lanzoni, Costa Rican long-distance runner
- Ronald Leung, Hong Kong politician and businessman in banking
- Ronald dos Santos Lopes (born 1998), Brazilian footballer
- Ronald Mallett, American physicist
- Ronald Mason Jr., African-American university president
- Rónald Matarrita, Costa Rican footballer
- Ronald Méndez (born 1982), Venezuelan volleyball player
- Ronald Michaud, American cartoonist
- Ronald D. Moore, American screenwriter and television producer
- Ronald Clark O'Bryan (1944–1984), American murderer
- Ronald Patrick (born 1991), American football player
- Ronald Pelton, American intelligence analyst and convicted spy
- Ronald Pereira Martins (born 2001), Brazilian footballer
- Ronald Pofalla (born 1959), German politician and manager
- Ronald Powell (born 1991), American football player
- Ronald Pearson (1959–2001), American actor, model and director
- Ronald van Raak (born 1969), Dutch politician
- Ronald A. Rasband (born 1951), American religious leader, member of the Quorum of the Twelve Apostles of The Church of Jesus Christ of Latter-day Saints
- Ronald Reagan (1911–2004), former actor, governor of California and 40th President of the United States
- Ronald Reid-Daly (1928–2010), Rhodesian military commander
- Ronald Ringsrud, US author and emerald expert
- Ronald Rollie Robinson (born 1985), Canadian curler
- Ronald Santanna Rodrigues (born 1997), Brazilian footballer
- Ronald Russell (disambiguation), multiple people
- Ronald S. Wilson (1933–1986), American psychologist and behavioral geneticist
- Ronald Scobie (1893–1969), British Army officer
- Ronald "Bon" Scott, lead singer of AC/DC from 1974 to 1980
- Ronald Schill, German judge and politician
- Ronald L. Schlicher, American diplomat
- Ronald Alan Schulz (1965–2005), American civilian contract worker killed in Iraq
- Ronald Searle (1920–2011), British cartoonist
- Ronald Lee Sheffield (born 1946), associate justice of the Arkansas Supreme Court
- Ronald Gene Simmons (1940–1990), American spree killer and family annihilator
- Ronald Steele, American basketball player
- Ronald Stretton, British track cyclist
- John Ronald Reuel Tolkien (1892–1973), British writer
- Ronald Venetiaan, former president of Suriname
- Ronald Virag (born 1938), French cardiovascular surgeon
- Ronald Wright (boxer), American professional boxer
- Ronald E. Walters (born 1962), American government official
- Ronald Zilberberg (born 1996), Israeli Olympic figure skater
- Ronald Zoodsma (born 1966), Dutch volleyball player

== Fictional characters ==
- Ronald McDonald, mascot of McDonald's
- Ronald Zellman, a character from The Sopranos

== People with the surname ==
- Allan Ronald (born 1938), Canadian doctor and microbiologist
- Angelica Ronald, British psychologist
- Bill Ronald (born 1949), Australian fencer
- James Ronald (1861–1941), Australian politician
- James T. Ronald (1855–1950), American politician
- Landon Ronald (1873–1938), English conductor, composer and pianist
- Mark Ronald, American engineer
- Nigel Ronald (1894–1973), British diplomat
- Norma Ronald (1930s–1993), British actress
- Owen Ronald (born 1993), Scottish footballer
- Pamela Ronald (born 1961), American geneticist
- Paul Ronald (born 1971), Scottish footballer and manager
- Peter Ronald (1889–1953), English footballer
- Terry Ronald, British musician
- Walter G. Ronald (1857–1936), American politician
- William Ronald (1926–1998), Canadian painter

== See also ==
- Ron (given name)
- Ronaldo
- Ronalds
- Ronaldson
- Ronnie (name)
- Ronny

== Sources ==
- Hanks, P; Hodges, F (2003). A Dictionary of First Names (MOBI). Oxford: Oxford University Press. ISBN 0-19-860605-2.
- Hanks, P; Hardcastle, K; Hodges, F (2006) [1990]. A Dictionary of First Names. Oxford Paperback Reference (2nd ed.). Oxford: Oxford University Press. ISBN 978-0-19-861060-1.
- Jones, D; Gimson, AC (1986) [1917]. Everyman's English Pronouncing Dictionary (14th ed.). J.M. Dent & Sons. OL 4296804M.
- Searle, D (1897) [1897]. Onomasticon Anglo-Saxonicum. Cambridge University Press.
