= Reg =

Reg or REG may refer to:

== Abbreviation ==
- Reg, referring to regular language, a formal language defined by regular expressions
- Reg, a colloquial term for vehicle registration plate
- Reg, a colloquial term for regulation CPA exam, an exam for accounting qualification
- Reg, an abbreviation of regina, queen, on coins or in law
- .reg, a Microsoft Windows registry file extension

== Acronym or initialism ==
- Raising for Effective Giving, a charity
- Random event generator (parapsychology)
- Raptor Education Group, Wisconsin, United States, cares for birds in distress
- Regal Entertainment Group, an American movie theater chain
- Rwanda Energy Group, a Rwandan energy company

== Places ==
- Reg, Iran, eastern Iran
- Reg, Gilan, northwestern Iran
- Reg District, Helmand, Afghanistan
- Reg District, Kandahar, Afghanistan
- Regent railway station, Melbourne, Australia

== Other uses ==
- REG, IATA code for Reggio Calabria Airport
- Reg, a nickname for desert pavement
- Reg (film), a BBC television drama about the Iraq War
- Reg, the robot in the children's animated TV show Rubbadubbers
- Reg group in the C-lectin protein family
- Reg, a character from the Made in Abyss franchise
- REG BBC, a Rwandan basketball team

== See also ==
- Reginald (disambiguation)
- Reggie (disambiguation)
- Regular (disambiguation)
