= Renaldo =

Given name

Renaldo is a given name. Notable people with the name include:

== Given name ==
- Renaldo "Obie" Benson (1937–2005), American soul and R&B singer and songwriter
- Renaldo Balkman (born 1984), American professional basketball player
- Renaldo Hill (born 1978), American football safety for the Denver Broncos of the National Football League
- Renaldo Kalari (footballer) (born 1984), Albanian football player
- Renaldo Kuhler (1931–2013), American artist and illustrator
- Renaldo Lapuz (born 1962), Filipino-American who auditioned on the seventh season of the television series American Idol
- Renaldo Lopes da Cruz (born 1970), Brazilian footballer who played as a forward for Ceilândia Esporte Clube
- Renaldo Major (born 1982), American professional basketball player, a 6'7" 190 lb. small forward
- Renaldo Nehemiah (born 1959), American athlete who dominated the 110 m hurdle event from 1978 until 1981
- Renaldo Rama (born 1990), Albanian football player
- Renaldo Snipes, (born 1956), American boxer from Houston, Texas
- Renaldo Samsara (born 1988), Indonesian-English film director
- Renaldo Turnbull (born 1966), former professional American football player
- Renaldo Wynn (born 1974), American football defensive end

== Other ==
- Duncan Renaldo (1904–1980), American actor who portrayed The Cisco Kid in films and TV
- Renaldo and Clara, surrealist movie, directed by and starring Bob Dylan
- Renaldo and the Loaf, English musical duo active in the late 1970s and most of the 1980s
