= Renault (name) =

French surname

Renault is a French surname, probably originating from Brittany, easily confused with Renaud, which in French is pronounced in the same way.

== Surname ==
Notable people with the surname Renault include:

- Ana Paula Renault (born 1981), Brazilian journalist, columnist and TV personality
- Bernard Renault (botanist) (1836–1904), French paleobotanist
- Bernard Renault (canoeist), French slalom canoeist
- Cécile Renault (1774–1794), French woman accused of attempting to assassinate Robespierre
- Fernand Renault (1865–1909), French business manager, one of the founders of the Renault automobile company
- Francis Renault (1893–1955), American female impersonator and vaudeville performer
- François Louis de Rousselet, Marquis de Châteaurenault (1637–1716), French vice-admiral, maréchal, and nobleman
- Gerardo Renault (1929–2026), Brazilian lawyer and politician
- Gilbert Renault (1904–1984), French Resistance secret agent during World War II
- Henri-René Renault (1891–1952), Canadian politician
- Jeanne Renault Saint-Laurent (1886–1966), wife of Louis St. Laurent, Prime Minister of Canada
- Louis Renault (jurist) (1843–1918), French jurist and educator, Nobel peace prize 1907
- Louis Renault (industrialist) (1877–1944), French industrialist, one of the founders of the Renault automobile company
- Marcel Renault (1872–1903), French race driver, one of the founders of the Renault automobile company
- Maxime Renault (born 1990), French racing cyclist
- Mary Renault (1905–1983), British writer
- Michel Renault (1927–1993), French ballet dancer and teacher
- Philip Francois Renault (before 1719–c. 1750), French explorer and courtier
- Pierre Renault (1697-1777), French colonial administrator in India.
- Stéphane Renault (born 1968), French badminton player
- Jean Malo-Renault (1900–1988), French engraver and librarian

== Given name ==
- Renault Renaldo Duncan (1904–1980), Duncan Renaldo, possibly Romanian-born American actor
- Renault Robinson (born 1942), US police officer and chairman of Chicago Housing Authority
