= Rainaldo (name) =

Rainaldo was a 12th-century architect in Pisa.

Rainaldo may also refer to:

- Rainaldo Brancacci, also Rinaldo Brancaccio, Italian cardinal from the 14th and 15th centuries
- Rainaldo Cancellieri, Roman Catholic prelate
