= Regina Gwynn =

- Born: Born in 1979 in Fayetteville, North Carolina, United States
- Nationality: African-American
- Known for: Co-Founder and CFO Black Women Talk Tech (BWTT), Co-Founder and CEO TresseNoire, Roadmap to Billions Conference
- Academics: Northwestern University-Kellogg School of Management Rutgers University Fashion Institute of Technology
- Awards and Nominations: 100 Most Powerful Women by Entrepreneur Magazine 2019, Top Ten Women in Tech by Essence Magazine 2020.
- Website: https://www.blackwomentalktech.com/

Regina Gwynn (born in 1979) is an African American tech entrepreneur, and co-founder of Black Women Talk Tech, as well as CEO of TresseNoire. Black Women Talk Tech (BWTT) is a collective that helps women of color entrepreneurs finance and build tech companies.

== Early life and education ==
Gwynn was born in 1979 in Fayetteville, North Carolina. At the age of nine, she began her entrepreneurial career by selling Avon products.

Gwynn attended the Fashion Institute of Technology from 1996-1998, where she studied fashion buying, marketing, and merchandising. She also attended Rutgers University from 1998- 2009, where she graduated with a Bachelor of Science in marketing. She simultaneously received an MBA in marketing, entrepreneurship, and strategy in 2009 from Northwestern University-Kellogg School of Management.

== Career ==
In 2009 Gwynn started her career in the Product Development Executive Training program at Macy's Inc. From 2010-2011, she became a management consultant at the Monitor Group. From 2011-2015 she transitioned into becoming a marketing executive at The Apparel Group in New York City.

In 2014 during her tenure at the Apparel Group, she launched her very own hairstylist on-location beauty booking app platform, TresseNoire which ended in 2020.

In 2017, Gwynn met and collaborated with tech founders Esosa Ighodaro and Lauren Washington. Where their interaction led to the creation of Black Women Talk Tech (BWTT). BWTT is a collective that has 500 plus women of color tech entrepreneurs, focusing on engineering and full-stack development.

In 2018, Gwynn with other tech collaborators Lauren Washington and Esosa Ighodaro was invited to be guest speakers at the Hustle House for SXSW. The main topic of discussion was how to circulate wealth within the community.

In 2020, BWTT, hosted its fourth annual conference, pairing more than 1,300 participants to potential viable resources. BWTT gained sponsorships from leading brands such as Walmart Connect and SheaMoisture to fund their 7th annual conference "Roadmap To Billions". BWTT is the largest conference for women of color in the tech industry.

== Awards and nominations ==
- In 2019, Gwynn received the award "100 Most Powerful Women" by Entrepreneur Magazine.
- She also in 2020, received the award "Top Ten Women in Tech" from Essence Magazine.

== Selected publication ==
- Gwynn, Regina, "Building a Two-Sided Marketplace With Regina Gwynn." 2021. New York
- Gwynn, Regina, "Esosa Ighodaro-Johnson and Regina Gynn are changing the landscape in Tech for Black Women!" 2022. New York
