= Rig-e Bala =

Rig-e Bala ريگ بالا
- Village
- Location within Iran
- Coordinates: 32°15′03″N 58°51′31″E
- Country: Iran
- Province: South Khorasan
- County: Khusf
- Bakhsh: Jolgeh-e Mazhan
- Rural District: Qaleh Zari

Population (2006)
  - Total: 7
- Time zone: UTC+3:30 (IRST)
  - Summer (DST): UTC+4:30 (IRDT)

Rig-e Bala (Persian: ريگ بالا, also Romanized as Rīg-e Bālā; also known as Rīg, Rek, and Kalāteh-ye Rīg) is a village in Qaleh Zari Rural District, Jolgeh-e Mazhan District, Khusf County, South Khorasan Province, Iran. At the 2006 census, its population was 7, in 4 families.
