= Reynold =

- Pronunciation: /ˈrɛnəld/
- Gender: Male

Origin
- Origin: Germanic
- Meaning: "advice", "powerful", "bright"

Other names
- Related names: Reginald, Reinhold, Ronald, Rognvald

Reynold is an English masculine given name that comes from an Old High German personal name made up of the element "ragin" (advice, decision) and "wald" (power, authority, brightness). It is a cognate of Rögnvaldr, which is also a source of the name Ronald. The Normans brought the name to England. Related names include: "Reginald" (English), "Reginaldo" (Italian), "Rinaldo" (Italian), "Reinaldo" (Portuguese, Spanish), "Reinhold" (German), "Reino" (Finnish), "Reynol" (German, Spanish), "Reinout" (Dutch), "Renaud" (French), "Reynaldo" (Spanish), and "Reynaud" (French). Reynold is a much less common surname than its derivative Reynolds; people with the surname "Reynold" include:

== Surname ==
- Hannah Reynold, Swedish singer with Lucky Twice
- John Reynold (fl. 1539), English politician
- Thomas Reynold (disambiguation)
