= Ronaldo Geron =

Filipino politician

Commissioner of the Bureau of Immigration
- Incumbent
- Assumed office January 6, 2016
- President: Benigno S. Aquino III
- Preceded by: Siegfred Mison

Personal details
- Born: January 4, 1963 (age 63)
- Education: University of the Philippines College of Law
- Profession: Attorney

Ronaldo Alea Geron (born January 4, 1963) is a Filipino attorney and politician who currently serves as the Commissioner of the Bureau of Immigration of the Philippines. Geron was appointed on January 6, 2016, by President Benigno S. Aquino III. Prior to being appointed as Commissioner, he was the Deputy Executive Secretary for Finance and Administration of the Office of the President. A lawyer by profession, he is a graduate of the University of the Philippines College of Law. Geron has been in government for over 20 years. Before joining the national government, Geron was provincial administrator and provincial board member of Batangas province.

Geron was appointed to replace Siegfred Mison, who was subject of a National Bureau of Investigation misconduct enquiry at the time.

Immediately after taking office, Geron created the Bureau of Immigration's Integrity Management Committee and identified human trafficking as a priority for his administration.

Geron's administration imposed new rules requiring the screening of foreigners in the Philippines. In April 2016, Geron ordered a manhunt for 600 illegal foreigners residing in the country who had been ordered to leave.
