= SV Neuhof =

German football club

- Full name: SV-Neuhof 1910 e.V.
- Founded: 1910
- Ground: Glückauf-Stadion
- Capacity: 4,500
- Chairman: Volker Ruppel / Karl-Heinz Ebert
- Manager: Alexander Bär
- League: Hessenliga (V)
- 2019–20: 17th, Hessenliga
Home colours

SV Neuhof is a German football club from the city of Neuhof in Hesse.

== Recent seasons ==
The recent season-by-season performance of the club:

| Season | Division | Tier | Position |
|---|---|---|---|
| 2014–15 | Gruppenliga Fulda | VII | 2nd ↑ |
| 2015–16 | Verbandsliga Hessen-Nord | VI | 11th |
| 2016–17 | Verbandsliga Hessen-Nord | VI | 8th |
| 2017–18 | Verbandsliga Hessen-Nord | VI | 7th |
| 2018–19 | Verbandsliga Hessen-Nord | VI | 2nd ↑ |
| 2019–20 | Hessenliga | V | |

- With the introduction of the Regionalligas in 1994 and the 3. Liga in 2008 as the new third tier, below the 2. Bundesliga, all leagues below dropped one tier. Also in 2008, a large number of football leagues in Hesse were renamed, with the Oberliga Hessen becoming the Hessenliga, the Landesliga becoming the Verbandsliga, the Bezirksoberliga becoming the Gruppenliga and the Bezirksliga becoming the Kreisoberliga.

| ↑ Promoted | ↓ Relegated |
