= Reinoud =

Reinoud may refer to:

- Reinoud I van Brederode (1336–1390)
- Reinoud II of Guelders (c. 1295–1343)
- Reinoud II van Brederode (1415–1473)
- Reinoud III of Guelders (1333–1371)
- Reinoud III van Brederode (1492–1556)
- Reinald IV, Duke of Guelders and Jülich (1365–1423)
- Reinoud IV van Brederode (1520–1584), father of Walraven III van Brederode
- Reinoud van Brederode (1567–1633), lord of Veenhuizen, North Holland and Wesenberg (Rakvere), Estonia

== See also ==
- Reynoud Diederik Jacob van Reede, 7th Earl of Athlone
