= Ronaldinho (given name) =

Ronaldinho (Ronaldo de Assis Moreira; born 1980) is a Brazilian football player.

Ronaldinho, a diminutive form of the given name "Ronaldo", often used as a term of endearment, may also refer to:

- Ronaldo (Brazilian footballer) (Ronaldo Luís Nazário de Lima; born 1976), Brazilian football striker and businessman
- Ronaldinho Gomes (born 1979), Santomean footballer

== See also ==
- Ronaldo (disambiguation)
