= Joseph-Louis Renaut =

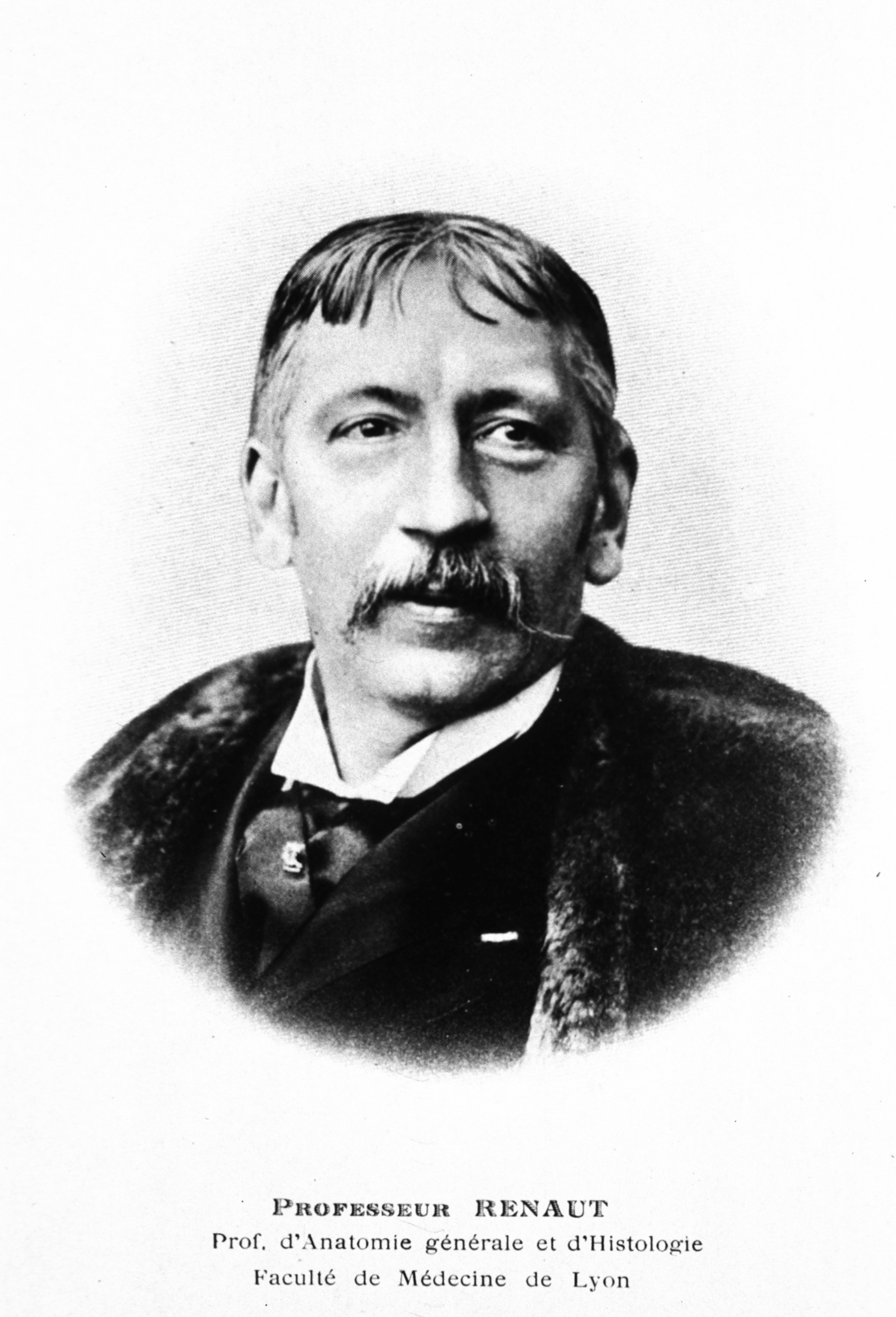

Joseph-Louis Renaut (7 December 1844 – 26 December 1917) was a French physician, anatomist, and histologist. A student of Louis-Antoine Ranvier, he served as professor of anatomy and histology at the faculty of medicine in Lyons. Renaut bodies or corpuscles found in nerve tissue are named after him.

Renaut was born in La Haye-Descartes, Indre-et-Loire, and studied medicine from 1864, first at Tours and then in Paris. In 1869 he became an interne des hôpitaux and continued to study under Victor André Cornil and Louis-Antoine Ranvier. In 1874 he submitted a thesis on erysipelas and earned two medal in 1876 and then became director of the pathology laboratory at the Charité Hospital, Paris. In 1877 he became head of anatomy and histology at Lyons where he taught for forty years while also working at the Croix-Rousse, Perron, and Hôtel-Dieu hospitals. From 1889 to 1899 he worked on a treatise of histology, the Traité d’histologie pratique. Renaut described cylindrical and long hyaline structures in the subperineural spaces of peripheral nerves in horses and donkeys in 1881 and called them “système hyalin”, which are now called Renaut corpuscles (or bodies).

Renaut also wrote a poetry work Ombres Colorées under the pen name Sylvain de Saulnay in 1906 and received an award from the Latin and French.
