= Ronalds =

Ronalds is a surname and a given name. Notable people with the name include:

== Surname ==
- Albert Francis Ronalds, Australian civil engineer
- Alfred Ronalds, fly fishing author, artist and Australian pioneer
- Andrew Ronalds, Australian politician and company director
- Edmund Ronalds (1819–1889), English chemist
- Emily Ronalds (1795–1889), English social reformer
- Fanny Ronalds, Mary Frances "Fanny" Ronalds (1839–1916), American socialite and amateur singer
- Francis Ronalds (1788–1873), English scientist and inventor who built the first working electric telegraph
- Hugh Ronalds (1760–1833), British nurseryman, horticulturalist and author

== Given name ==
This name is the Latvian equivalent of Ronald. See Latvian name for explanation.

- Ronalds Arājs (born 29 November 1987), Latvian athlete
- Ronalds Cinks (born 11 March 1990), Latvian professional ice-hockey player
- Ronalds Ķēniņš (born February 28, 1991), Latvian professional ice hockey forward
- Ronalds Žagars (born 1950), Latvian football goalkeeper
- Ronalds Zaķis (born 1987), Latvian basketball player
