= Renaud I =

Renaud I is the name of:

- Renauld I, Count of Nevers (died 1040)
- Renaud I of Burgundy (986–1057)
- Renaud I of Bar (1080–1149)
- Renaud I, Count of Dammartin (1165–1227)
