= Joabe =

Brazilian footballer

Personal information
- Full name: Joabe Batista Pereira
- Date of birth: May 29, 1989 (age 37)
- Place of birth: Serra, Brazil
- Height: 1.77 m (5 ft 10 in)
- Position: Attacking midfielder

Team information
- Current team: Gama

Youth career
- 2005–2007: Cruzeiro

Senior career*
Years	Team	Apps	(Gls)
2008	Cruzeiro	3	(0)
2008	→ Ipatinga (loan)		
2008–2009	→ Villa Nova (loan)		
2009–2010	→ Ipatinga (loan)		
2010–2011	Internacional B		
2011–	Gama		
- * Club domestic league appearances and goals

Joabe Batista Pereira or simply Joabe (born May 29, 1989, in Serra), is a Brazilian attacking midfielder. Since 2011, he has played for Sociedade Esportiva do Gama.
