= Reg, Iran =

Reg رگ
- Village
- Location within Iran
- Coordinates: 32°20′08″N 59°07′14″E
- Country: Iran
- Province: South Khorasan
- County: Khusf
- Bakhsh: Jolgeh-e Mazhan
- Rural District: Qaleh Zari

Population (2006)
  - Total: 23
- Time zone: UTC+3:30 (IRST)
  - Summer (DST): UTC+4:30 (IRDT)

Reg (Persian: رگ, also Romanized as Rek; also known as Rak, Riqq, and Rīqqah) is a village in Qaleh Zari Rural District, Jolgeh-e Mazhan District, Khusf County, South Khorasan Province, Iran. As of the 2006 census, its population was 23 in 13 families.
