= Rainald =

Rainald is a name of a number of historical persons listed in the Domesday Book. The name may refer to:

- Rainald of Abingdon
- Rainald of Dassel
- Rainald Goetz
- Rainald Knightley, 1st Baron Knightley
- Rainald of Urslingen
