= Ronaldson =

Ronaldson is a surname. Notable people with the surname include:

- Duncan Ronaldson (1879–1947), Scottish football player
- James Ronaldson (1769–1841), co-founder of Binny & Ronaldson
- John Ronaldson (1946–2026), Australian rules football player
- Malcolm Ronaldson (1917–2004), South African cricketer
- Michael Ronaldson (born 1954), Australian politician
- Tony Ronaldson (born 1972), Australian basketball player
