= Reggie White (disambiguation) =

Reggie White (1961-2004) was an American football defensive end.

Reggie White may also refer to:

- Reggie White (defensive lineman, born 1970), American football defensive tackle
- Reggie White (running back) (born 1979), American football running back
- Reggie White Jr. (born 1996), American football wide receiver
