= Ronaldo (footballer, born 1980) =

Brazilian footballer

Personal information
- Full name: Ronaldo Maczinski
- Date of birth: 11 September 1980 (age 46)
- Place of birth: Reboucas, Brazil
- Height: 1.73 m (5 ft 8 in)
- Position: Striker

Youth career
- –: Marítimo

Senior career*
Years	Team	Apps	(Gls)
199?–2005	Marítimo B		
2001–2005	Marítimo	24	(3)
2004	→ Santa Clara (loan)	13	(0)
2005–2006	Camacha	23	(14)
2006–2009	Rio Ave	50	(6)
2009–2011	Oliveirense	34	(6)
- * Club domestic league appearances and goals as of 15:24, 1 December 2008 (UTC)

Ronaldo Maczinski (born 11 September 1980), known as Ronaldo, is a Brazilian footballer who plays as a forward; he had a lengthy career in Portuguese football.
