= Reggie Meredith-Fitiao =

American Samoan artist and academic

Reggie Meredith-Fitiao is an American Samoan artist and academic.

== Biography ==
Meredith-Fitiao is considered an expert in barkcloth textile art, also known as siapo or tapa cloth. She is a professor of art at the American Samoa Community College. She has worked with international museum conservation staff to lead barkcloth workshops, including at the University of Glasgow and Oakland Museum of California. She also works in conservation herself, and was the leader of a restoration project at the Jean P. Haydon Museum in Pago Pago.
