= Reinout =

Reinout is a given name. Notable people with this name include:

- Reinout Oerlemans (born 1971), Dutch soap opera actor, film director, television presenter and television producer
- Reinout Scholte (born 1967), Dutch cricketer
- Reinout Scholten van Aschat (born 1989), Dutch actor
- Reinout Willem van Bemmelen (1904–1983), Dutch geologist
