= Rinaldo =

Rinaldo may refer to:

- Renaud de Montauban (also spelled Renaut, Renault, Italian: Rinaldo di Montalbano, Dutch: Reinout van Montalbaen, German: Reinhold von Montalban), a legendary knight in the medieval Matter of France
- Rinaldo (Jerusalem Liberated), a character in a 1580 epic poem by Tasso
  - Rinaldo (opera), a 1711 Italian opera by George Frideric Handel, based on the above character
  - Rinaldo (cantata), an 1863 cantata by Johannes Brahms, based on the above character
- HMS Rinaldo, one of four ships of the name launched between 1808 and 1943 by the Royal Navy

== Books and films ==
- The History of Rinaldo Rinaldini, a 1798 novel by Christian August Vulpius
  - Rinaldo Rinaldini (film), a 1927 film based on the book

== People with the name ==
=== Given name ===
- Rinaldo (footballer, born 1966), full name Antônio Rinaldo Gonçalves, Brazilian football forward
- Rinaldo (footballer, born 1975), full name Rinaldo Santana dos Santos, Brazilian football striker
- Rinaldo di Jenne (c. 1185 or 1199–1261), who later became Pope Alexander IV
- Rinaldo de Lamare (1910–2002), Brazilian physician who specialized in pediatrics
- Rinaldo Rigola (1868–1954), Italian politician

=== Surname ===
- Giovanni Rinaldo (1720–1795), Count of Carli-Rubbi, Italian economist and antiquarian
- Matthew John Rinaldo (1931–2008), United States Representative from New Jersey
- Sandie Rinaldo (born 1950), Canadian television journalist and news anchor
- Theodore Rinaldo (1944–2000), an American businessman, charismatic religious leader, and convicted child sex offender
- Zac Rinaldo (born 1990), Canadian professional ice hockey player

== See also ==
- Monte Rinaldo, municipality in the province of Fermo, Italy
