= Ragnvald =

Ragnvald is a Norwegian given name. Notable people with the name include:

- Ragnvald A. Tamber (1913–1973), Norwegian naval officer
- Ragnvald Alfred Roscher Lund (1899–1975), Norwegian military officer
- Ragnvald Bagge (1903–1991), Swedish diplomat
- Ragnvald Berg (1870–1946), Norwegian farmer and politician
- Ragnvald Blakstad (1866–1929), Norwegian industrialist and hydropower pioneer
- Ragnvald Blix (1882–1958), Norwegian illustrator, caricaturist, and magazine editor
- Ragnvald Bødtker (1859–1946), Norwegian engineer
- Ragnvald Dahl (1938–2018), Norwegian civil servant and politician
- Ragnvald Einbu (1870–1943), Norwegian woodcarver and painter
- Ragnvald Gjerløw (1853–1936), Norwegian priest and writer
- Ragnvald Graff (1887–1975), Norwegian barrister and military officer
- Ragnvald Heidumhære (9th century), King of Vestfold
- Ragnvald Hjerlow (1863–1947), Norwegian painter and teacher
- Ragnvald Høier (1938–2009), Norwegian physicist
- Ragnvald Hvoslef (1872–1944), Norwegian Nazi politician
- Ragnvald Indrebø (1891–1984), Norwegian Lutheran Bishop
- Ragnvald Ingebrigtsen (1882–1975), Norwegian physician
- Ragnvald Ingesson (late 11th century), only known son and heir of King Inge I of Sweden
- Ragnvald Ingvarsson (10th century), officer of the Varangian Guard
- Ragnvald Iversen (1882–1960), Norwegian educator and professor
- Ragnvald Knaphövde (early 12th century), King of Sweden
- Ragnvald Marensius Gundersen (1907–1985), Norwegian politician
- Ragnvald Martinsen (1906–1987), Norwegian cyclist
- Ragnvald Maseng (1891–1920), Norwegian sports shooter
- Ragnvald Mikal Andersen (1899–1995), Norwegian politician
- Ragnvald Moe (1873–1965), Norwegian historian
- Ragnvald Nestos (1877–1942), Norwegian-American politician
- Ragnvald Olsen (1897–1948), Norwegian sports wrestler
- Ragnvald Ørnulf Rolsdorph Dahl (1900–1971), Norwegian military officer
- Ragnvald Paulson (1858–1926), Norwegian book publisher and politician
- Ragnvald Roscher Nielsen (1891–1979), Norwegian military officer
- Ragnvald Skrede (1904–1983), Norwegian author, journalist, literature critic, and translator
- Ragnvald Smedvik (1894–1975), Norwegian footballer
- Ragnvald Soma (born 1979), Norwegian footballer
- Ragnvald Thunestvedt (1926–1980), Danish racewalker
- Ragnvald Ulfsson the Old, jarl of Västergötland and possibly father of King Stenkil of Sweden
- Ragnvald Vaage (1889–1966), Norwegian poet, novelist, and children's writer
- Ragnvald Winjum (1917–1965), Norwegian jurist and politician

== Middle name ==
- Elvin Ragnvald Heiberg III (1932–2013), United States Army general
- Haldur Ragnvald Grüner (1818–1858), the founder of Grüners Handelsakademi
