= Rognvald =

Rognvald or Rögnvald or Rægnald is an Old Norse name (Old Norse Rǫgnvaldr, modern Icelandic Rögnvaldur; in Old English Regenweald and in Old Irish, Middle Irish Ragnall). Notable people with the name include:

== Rogvolod ==
- Rogvolod (mid-10th century), Prince of Polotsk

== Rognvald ==
- Rognvald Brusason (died c. 1046), Jarl of Orkney
- Rögnvald Eriksson (c. 920–933)
- Rognvald Eysteinsson (fl. late 9th century), Jarl of Møre
- Rognvald Herschell, 3rd Baron Herschell (1923–2008), British hereditary peer and politician
- Rögnvald Kali Kolsson (12th century), Norwegian saint and jarl of part of Orkney

== Rögnvaldr ==
- Rǫgnvaldr Guðrøðarson (died 1229), King of the Isles
- Rögnvaldr Óláfsson (fl. 1164) of the Isle of Man (ruled 1164)
- Rǫgnvaldr Óláfsson (died 1249) of the Isle of Man (ruled 1249)
