= Ronnie (name) =

Ronnie is a given name and a surname. It can be a pet form of the masculine name Ronald and the feminine name Veronica.

The masculine Ronald is derived from the Old Norse Rögnvaldr, which is composed of the elements regin ("advice", "decision") and valdr ("ruler"). The feminine Veronica is derived from a form of Berenice, which is derived from the Greek Berenikē and Pherenīkē and means "victory bringer".

== Given name ==
=== Female ===
- Ronnie Abrams (born 1968), American district judge
- Ronnie Ancona (classicist), American classical scholar and professor emerita of classics
- Ronnie Dunne (1927–2021), Irish operatic soprano and voice teacher
- Ronnie Dunne, American actress
- Ronnie Edwards, several people
- Ronnie Eldridge (1931–2026), American activist, businesswoman, politician, and television host
- Ronnie Elliott, several people
- Ronnie Fair (born 1978), American retired WUSA player
- Ronnie G, Nigerian radio presenter and broadcaster
- Ronnie Gajownik (born 1993), American former softball- and baseball player, and baseball coach and manager
- Ronnie Gibbons (born 1980), English former professional footballer
- Ronnie Gilbert (1926–2015), American folk singer, songwriter, actress, and political activist
- Ronnie Gorrie (born 1971/1972), Aboriginal Australian writer
- Ronnie Haran (born 1939/1940), American actress, photographer, publicist, and booking manager
- Ronnie L. Podolefsky (born 1950), American attorney, legal historian, social justice advocate, and feminist
- Ronnie Lichtman (born 1950), American midwife, educator, writer, and advocate for women's health
- Ronnie Masterson (1926–2014), Irish actress
- Ronnie Negus, Canadian contestant on The Real Housewives of Vancouver
- Ronnie Reis (born 1966), American former tennis player
- Ronnie Specter, American make-up artist
- Ronnie Spector (1943–2022), American singer; past member of girl group The Ronettes
- Ronnie Stevens (disambiguation), several people
- Ronnie, the Bren Gun Girl, nickname of Veronica Foster (1922–2000), Canadian cultural icon during World War II
- Ronnie Wells (1943–2007), American jazz singer and educator
- Ronnie Wilbur, American theoretical- and experimental linguist, and university professor
- Ronnie Yeskel (1948/1949–2025), American casting director

=== Male ===
- Ronnie A. Sabb (born 1958), American politician and attorney
- Ronnie Aaron Killings, real name of R-Truth (born 1972), American professional wrestler
- Ronnie Abeysinghe (1936–2002), Sri Lankan politician
- Ronnie Adams (1916–2004), Northern Irish rally driver
- Ronnie Adolfsson (born 1956), Swedish Olympic biathlete
- Ronnie Aguilar (born 1987), American former NBA-, TPBL-, and CBL player
- Ronnie Aird (1902–1986), English cricketer, cricket administrator, and British Army officer
- Ronnie Aldrich (1916–1993), English easy listening- and jazz pianist, arranger, conductor, and composer
- Ronnie Allen (1929–2001), English international footballer and manager
- Ronnie Allen (pool player) (1938–2013), American professional pool player
- Ronnie Alonte (born 1996), Filipino actor, singer, dancer, and MPBL- and PSL player
- Ronnie Alsup (1955–2014), American Paralympic athlete and standing volleyball player
- Ronnie Amadi (born 1981), American former AFL- and CFL player
- Ronnie Anderson (born 1974), American former NFL player
- Ronnie Apteker (born 1967), South African Internet pioneer, writer, and film producer
- Ronnie Archer-Morgan (born 1950), British television presenter and antiques collector
- Ronnie Arneill (born 1981), Canadian professional wrestler and trainer
- Ronnie Aronsson, Swedish footballer
- Ronnie Arrow (born 1947), American former college basketball coach
- Ronnie Ash (born 1988), American Olympic hurdler
- Ronnie Atkins (born 1964), Danish singer; member of hard rock/heavy metal band Pretty Maids
- Ronnie Attard (born 1999), American NHL player
- Ronnie Bacon (1935–2020), English professional footballer
- Ronnie Baker, several people
- Ronnie Ball (1927–1984), English jazz pianist, composer, and arranger
- Ronnie Balya (born 1961), Ugandan brigadier general
- Ronnie Bardah (born 1982), American professional poker player
- Ronnie Barker (1929–2005), English actor, comedian, and writer
- Ronnie Barnes (American football) (born 1952), American NFL athletic trainer
- Ronnie Barrett (born 1954), American firearm designer
- Ronnie Barron (1943–1997), American actor, musician, and blue-eyed soul singer
- Ronnie Bass (born 1955), American former college football player
- Ronnie Bassett Jr. (born 1995), American professional stock car racing driver
- Ronnie Båthman (born 1959), Swedish former professional tennis player
- Ronnie Bauser (1928–2017), South African rugby union player
- Ronnie Baxter (born 1961), English former professional darts player
- Ronnie Bedford (1931–2014), American jazz drummer and professor
- Ronnie Bell, several people
- Ronnie Belliard (born 1975), American former MLB player
- Ronnie Biggs (1929–2013), English thief
- Ronnie Bird (born 1946), French singer
- Ronnie Bird (footballer) (1941–2005), English professional footballer
- Ronnie Birkett (1927–1992), English professional footballer
- Ronnie Black (born 1958), American professional golfer
- Ronnie Blackman (1925–2016), English professional footballer
- Ronnie Blair (born 1949), Northern Irish former professional footballer and manager
- Ronnie Blye (1941–2016), American NFL player
- Ronnie Bond (?–1992), English past member of rock band The Troggs
- Ronnie Boodoosingh (born 1969/1970), Trinidadian jurist
- Ronnie Boon (1909–1998), Welsh international rugby union player, and British Army personnel
- Ronnie Bosielo (1957–2018), South African Supreme Court judge
- Ronnie Bowman (1961–2026), American bluegrass singer and composer
- Ronnie Boyce (1943–2025), English professional footballer
- Ronnie Boykins (1935–1980), American jazz bassist
- Ronnie Bradford (born 1970), American former NFL player
- Ronnie Bradford (football chairman) (1942–2009), Scottish football chairman
- Ronnie Bregman (born 1958), Israeli political scientist, writer, and journalist
- Ronnie Bremer (born 1978), Danish racecar driver
- Ronnie Bretone, American past member of pop band Crazy Elephant
- Ronnie Brewer (born 1985), American former NBA player and current assistant coach
- Ronnie Briggs (1943–2008), Northern Irish footballer
- Ronnie Bright (1938–2015), American R&B and doo-wop singer
- Ronnie Brody (1918–1991), English actor
- Ronnie Brown (disambiguation), several people
- Ronnie Browne (born 1937), Scottish musician and songwriter; past member of folk group The Corries
- Ronnie Bruno, American businessman
- Ronnie Brunswijk (born 1961), Surinamese politician, businessman, former rebel leader, footballer, and convicted drug trafficke
- Ronnie Bryan (1898–1970), English cricketer, and soldier during both World Wars
- Ronnie Buckley (born 1986), Australian discus thrower
- Ronnie Bucknum (1936–1992), American race car driver
- Ronnie Bull, several people
- Ronnie Bunting (1948–1980), Irish politician and socialist activist
- Ronnie Burbeck (1934–2025), English footballer
- Ronnie Burgess (1963–2021), American NFL player
- Ronnie Burke (1921–2003), English association footballer
- Ronnie Burkett (born 1957), Canadian puppeteer
- Ronnie Burnet (1918–1999), English cricketer
- Ronnie Burns, several people
- Ronnie Burrage (born 1959), American jazz drummer
- Ronnie Burrell (born 1983), American former professional basketball player and current assistant coach
- Ronnie Butler (1937–2017), Bahamian calypso- and rake-and-scrape entertainer and singer
- Ronnie Byrne (1900–1966), Australian VFL player
- Ronnie Cahill (1915–1992), American NFL player
- Ronnie Cairns (1934–2016), English professional footballer
- Ronnie Calderon (born 1952), Israeli former professional footballer
- Ronnie Caldwell (1948–1967), American soul- and R&B musician; past member of funk band Bar-Kays
- Ronnie Camacho (born 1935), Mexican former professional baseball player and manager
- Ronnie Cameron (born 1989), American former NFL player
- Ronnie Campbell (disambiguation), several people
- Ronnie Canizaro, American member of progressive metalcore band Born of Osiris
- Ronnie Carroll (1934–2015), Northern Irish singer, entertainer, and political candidate
- Ronnie Carroll (American football) (born 1949), American former NFL player
- Ronnie Caryl (1953–2023), English guitarist
- Ronnie Caveness (1943–2014), American NFL player
- Ronnie Chamberlain (1924–1999), British jazz clarinetist and saxophonist
- Ronnie Chambers (born c. 1934), Northern Irish former sprinter
- Ronnie Chan (born 1949), Hong Kong businessman
- Ronnie Chance (born 1968), American politician
- Ronnie Chatterji (born 1978), American academic and policymaker
- Ronnie Chokununga (born 1992), Zimbabwean cricketer
- Ronnie Clark (1932–2013), Scottish professional footballer
- Ronnie Clayton, several people
- Ronnie Cocks (1943–2017), Maltese footballer
- Ronnie Coffman, American plant scientist and professor
- Ronnie Coleman (born 1964), American former professional bodybuilder
- Ronnie Coleman (American football) (born 1951), American former NFL player
- Ronnie Cook (?–1990), English murder victim
- Ronnie Cooke (born 1984), South African rugby union player
- Ronnie Cope (1934–2016), English footballer
- Ronnie Corbett (1930–2016), Scottish stand-up comedian, actor, and Royal Air Force officer
- Ronnie Cord (1943–1986), Brazilian singer
- Ronnie Cornwell (1905–1975), English businessman and arms dealer
- Ronnie Correy (born 1966), American former international motorcycle speedway rider
- Ronnie Coulter, Scottish murderer
- Ronnie Courtney (born 1957), American high school- and college sports coach, and former player
- Ronnie Cowan, several people
- Ronnie Coyle (1964–2011), Scottish professional footballer
- Ronnie Craig (1916–2009), Northern Irish international rugby union player, and Presbyterian minister
- Ronnie Cramer (1957–2021), American film producer, film director, screenwriter, artist, and composer
- Ronnie Creager (born 1974), American professional skateboarder and company owner
- Ronnie Cromer (born 1947), American politician
- Ronnie Crudup Jr. (born 1977), American politician, activist, and pastor
- Ronnie Cruz (born 1981), American former NFL player
- Ronnie Cuber (1941–2022), American jazz saxophonist
- Ronnie Cunningham, several people
- Ronnie Curran (born 1940), Scottish former footballer
- Ronnie Cush, British actor
- Ronnie Cutrone (1948–2013), American Neo-pop painter and nightclub impresario
- Ronnie D. Lishus, American retired professional wrestler
- Ronnie Dapo (born 1952), American film- and television actor
- Ronnie Davis (1950–2017), Jamaican reggae singer
- Ronnie Davis (darts player) (born 1942), English retired professional darts player
- Ronnie Davis (drag racer) (1950–2016), American drag racer
- Ronnie Dawson, several people
- Ronnie Day (born 1988), American songwriter
- Ronnie Dean Tinsley (born 1975), American singer-songwriter
- Ronnie Deauville (1925–1990), American Swing singer, and naval soldier during World War II
- Ronnie DeFeo (1951–2021), American murderer
- Ronnie Delany (1935–2026), Irish Olympic middle-distance runner
- Ronnie del Carmen (born 1959), Filipino writer, director, storyboard artist, illustrator, and voice actor
- Ronnie Deleon, American professional kickboxer
- Ronnie Delport (1931–2023), South African cricketer
- Ronnie de Mel (1925–2024), Sri Lankan civil servant and politician
- Ronnie DePasco (1943–2003), American politician
- Ronnie DeVoe (born 1967), American singer and rapper
- Ronnie Dicks (1924–2004), English professional footballer
- Ronnie Dix (1912–1998), English professional footballer
- Ronnie Dixon (born 1971), American former NFL player
- Ronnie Dodd (1911–1955), English footballer
- Ronnie Dove (born 1935), American pop- and country music singer
- Ronnie Drew (1934–2008), Irish singer, folk musician, and actor; past member of folk band The Dubliners
- Ronnie Duane (born 1963), English former professional rugby league footballer
- Ronnie Dugger (1930–2025), American progressive journalist
- Ronnie Duke (1931–1981), English musician, dancer, and comedian; member of cabaret duo Dukes and Lee
- Ronnie Duman (1929–1968), American racing driver
- Ronnie Duncan (born 1983), Scottish international lawn bowler
- Ronnie Dunn (born 1953), American country music singer-songwriter and record executive; member of music duo Brooks & Dunn
- Ronnie Dunn (footballer) (1908–1994), English professional footballer, and World War II personnel
- Ronnie Dürrenmatt (born 1979), Swiss Olympic slalom canoeist
- Ronnie Dyson (1950–1990), American soul- and R&B singer and actor
- Ronnie Earl (born 1953), American blues guitarist and music instructor
- Ronnie Earle (1942–2020), American attorney, judge, and politician
- Ronnie Eckstine (born 1946), American former actor, music manager, and fugitive
- Ronnie Ekelund (born 1972), Danish former professional footballer
- Ronnie Ellenblum (1952–2021), Israeli university professor of geography
- Ronnie Eriksson (born 1972), Scottish rugby union player
- Ronnie Evangelista (born 1964), Filipino former military officer and politician
- Ronnie Faisst (born 1977), American professional freestyle motocross- and snow bikecross rider
- Ronnie Fearn, Baron Fearn (1931–2022), British politician
- Ronnie Fernández (born 1991), Chilean professional footballer
- Ronnie Fieg (born 1982), American fashion designer and businessman
- Ronnie Fields (born 1977), American former CBA-, PBA-, ABA-, SPB-, and LBL player
- Ronnie Fillemon Kanalelo (born 1971), Namibian retired footballer
- Ronnie Flanagan (born 1949), Northern Irish retired senior police officer
- Ronnie Flex (born 1992), Dutch hip hop performer and rapper
- Ronnie Flippo (born 1937), American politician and accountant
- Ronnie Floyd (born 1955), American Baptist pastor, and former Southern Baptist executive
- Ronnie Fokes (1912–1944), English Royal Air Force flying ace during World War II
- Ronnie Ford (1913–1998), English cricketer, and Royal Air Force officer during World War II
- Ronnie Foster (born 1950), American funk- and soul jazz organist, and record producer
- Ronnie Fouch (born 1989), American college football coach and former player
- Ronnie Fraser (1929–2010), Scottish writer, broadcaster, and politician
- Ronnie Free (born 1936), American jazz drummer
- Ronnie Freeman (born 1973), American Christian musician, pianist, and worship leader
- Ronnie Gafney (born 1980), American-born Israeli former footballer
- Ronnie Galyon (1951–2020), American conjoined twin
- Ronnie Garvin, ring name of Roger Barnes (born 1945), Canadian former professional wrestler
- Ronnie Gaylord (1930–2004), Italian-American musician, songwriter, pantomimer, and comedian
- Ronnie Gene Blevins (born 1977), American character actor
- Ronnie Genz (1930–2016), English international motorcycle speedway rider
- Ronnie Ghent (born 1980), American former NFL player and AIF coach
- Ronnie Gideon (born 1964), American MLB coach and former minor league player
- Ronnie Gil Gavan (born 1969), Filipino admiral
- Ronnie Glavin (born 1951), Scottish former footballer
- Ronnie Glynn (born 1970), American politician, small business owner, and former army master sergeant
- Ronnie Golden, British singer, guitarist, and comedian
- Ronnie Goodman (1961–2020), American artist and runner
- Ronnie Goodson, American past member of doo-wop musical group Ronnie & the Hi-Lites
- Ronnie Gould (born 1982), English former professional footballer
- Ronnie Govender (1934–2021), South African playwright, theatre director, and activist
- Ronnie Grandison (born 1964), American former NBA-, CBA-, and IBL player
- Ronnie Green, several people
- Ronnie Greenwald (1934–2016), American Orthodox Jewish rabbi, businessman, and educator
- Ronnie Grieveson (1909–1998), South African cricketer
- Ronnie Grist, American candidate in the 2010 United States House of Representatives elections in Georgia
- Ronnie Gundo (born 1992), Kenyan basketball player
- Ronnie Gustave, Dominican international football coach
- Ronnie Hakin (born 1950), Northern Irish former international rugby union player
- Ronnie Haliburton (born 1968), American former NFL player
- Ronnie Hamilton (born 1945), Scottish retired professional footballer
- Ronnie Hammond (1950–2011), American singer; past member of Southern rock band Atlanta Rhythm Section
- Ronnie Hannah (born 1945), Scottish former international rugby union player
- Ronnie Harmon (born 1964), American former NFL player
- Ronnie Harrell (born 1996), American GBL player
- Ronnie Harris, several people
- Ronnie Harrison (born 1997), American NFL player
- Ronnie Hawkins (1935–2022), American-born Canadian rock and roll singer
- Ronnie Hazlehurst (1928–2007), English composer and conductor
- Ronnie Heard (born 1976), American former NFL player
- Ronnie Hellström (1949–2022), Swedish professional footballer
- Ronnie Henares (born 1955), Filipino actor, television host, producer, talent manager, comedian, and musician
- Ronnie Henderson (born 1974), American former NBA player
- Ronnie Henry (born 1984), English former professional footballer
- Ronnie Hepworth (1919–2006), English professional footballer
- Ronnie Herel, English DJ, radio presenter, and former dance musician
- Ronnie Hickman (born 2001), American NFL player
- Ronnie Hildersley (born 1965), Scottish former professional footballer
- Ronnie Hill (1934–2011), South African international rugby union player
- Ronnie Hillman (1991–2022), American NFL player
- Ronnie Hilton (1926–2001), English singer
- Ronnie Hira (born 1987), New Zealand international cricketer
- Ronnie Holassie (born 1971), Trinidad and Tobago Olympic long-distance runner
- Ronnie Honeycutt (?–2024), American past member of rock band Jackyl
- Ronnie Hopkins (born 1962), American former professional stock car racing driver
- Ronnie Hornaday (born 1979), American NASCAR driver
- Ronnie Hsia (born 1955), American historian and university professor
- Ronnie Huckeba, American retired football coach
- Ronnie Hudson (born 1957), American artist, bassist, composer, and record producer
- Ronnie Irani (born 1971), English former cricketer
- Ronnie Ish, British-American past member of rock band As It Is (band)
- Ronnie Isidore, Dominican politician
- Ronnie Jackson, real name of Lil' Ronnie (born 1983), American record producer, songwriter, and entrepreneur
- Ronnie Jagday (born 1978), Canadian Olympic international field hockey player
- Ronnie James (1917–1977), Welsh professional boxer, and World War II personnel
- Ronnie James Dio (1942–2010), American heavy metal singer-songwriter
- Ronnie Jepson (born 1963), English football manager, coach, and former player
- Ronnie Jerome Hill (?–2019), American perpetrator of the 2019 Miramar shootout
- Ronnie Johncox (born 1969), American professional racecar driver
- Ronnie Johns (politician) (born 1949), American politician
- Ronnie Johnson (born 1993), American-born Canadian professional basketball player
- Ronnie Jones, several people
- Ronnie Joyner (1959–2024), American NBL player
- Ronnie Kartman, American country singer
- Ronnie Kasrils (born 1938), South African politician, former guerrilla, anti-apartheid activist, and military commander
- Ronnie Kauffman (born 1946), American pair skater
- Ronnie Kavanagh (1931–2021), Irish rugby union player
- Ronnie Kerr (born 1974), American actor, writer, and producer
- Ronnie Khalil (born 1977), American stand-up comedian and actor
- Ronnie King (born 1963), American musician, producer, composer, arranger, and philanthropist
- Ronnie King (The Stampeders) (1947–2024), Dutch-Canadian musician; past member of rock band The Stampeders
- Ronnie Kisekka (born 1991), Ugandan footballer
- Ronnie Knight (1934–2023), English convicted criminal and nightclub owner
- Ronnie Knox (1935–1992), American NFL- and CFL player
- Ronnie Koes (1937–2014), American NFL- and CFL player
- Ronnie Kole (1931–2020), American jazz pianist
- Ronnie Kosloff (born 1948), American-born Israeli professor of theoretical chemistry
- Ronnie Kotkamp (born 1972), New Zealand former cricketer
- Ronnie Kray (1933–1995), English gangster and nightclub owner
- Ronnie Lamont (1941–2022), Irish international rugby union player
- Ronnie Landfield (born 1947), American abstract painter
- Ronnie Lane (1946–1997), English musician, songwriter, and record producer
- Ronnie Lang (born 1927), American jazz alto saxophonist
- Ronnie Larsen, American playwright and film director
- Ronnie Latham (1929–1973), English boxer
- Ronnie Laws (born 1950), American jazz-, rhythm and blues-, and funk saxophonist and singer
- Ronnie Lazaro (born 1957), Filipino film- and television actor, producer, casting director, and art director
- Ronnie Leahy (born 1947), Scottish keyboard player
- Ronnie LeBlanc (born 1968), Canadian politician
- Ronnie Le Drew (1947–2026), Canadian-born British puppeteer and actor
- Ronnie Lee (disambiguation), several people
- Ronnie Leibowitz (born 1954), Israeli convicted bank robber
- Ronnie Leitch (1953–2018), Sri Lankan dramatist, actor, comedian, singer, presenter, and social activist
- Ronnie Lendrum (1938–2020), Welsh boxer
- Ronnie Lessa (born 1970), Brazilian former military police officer, and convicted criminal
- Ronnie Lester (born 1959), American former NBA player and executive
- Ronnie Leten (born 1956), Belgian businessman
- Ronnie Letham (1949–2008), Scottish actor
- Ronnie Liang, Filipino singer, actor, model, influencer, licensed pilot, and army reservist officer
- Ronnie Lippett (born 1960), American former NFL player
- Ronnie Liu Tian Khiew (born 1958), Malaysian politician
- Ronnie Lombard (1928–?), South African Olympic gymnast
- Ronnie Lott (born 1959), American former NFL player
- Ronnie Lowrie (born 1955), Scottish retired professional footballer and manager
- Ronnie Lupe, Native American politician
- Ronnie Mabra, American attorney and politician
- Ronnie MacGilvray (1930–2007), American NBA player
- Ronnie Mack (1940–1963), American songwriter, singer, and talent manager
- Ronnie Magramo (born 1972), Filipino retired professional boxer
- Ronnie Magsanoc (born 1966), Filipino PBA coach, analyst, and former player
- Ronnie Mallett (born 1960), American former college football player
- Ronnie Mann (born 1986), English professional mixed martial artist
- Ronnie Marruda (born 1954), Brazilian actor, singer, and street vendor
- Ronnie Martin, several people
- Ronnie Mather (1927–2011), English professional rugby league footballer
- Ronnie Mathews (1935–2008), American jazz pianist, composer, and educator
- Ronnie Matias (born 1983), Filipino MPBL- and PSL player
- Ronnie Mauge (born 1969), English-born Trinidad and Tobago former professional footballer
- Ronnie McAda (born 1973), American former NFL player
- Ronnie McCluskey (1936–2011), Scottish footballer
- Ronnie McCollum (born 1978), American former professional basketball player and coach
- Ronnie McCoury (born 1967), American mandolin player, singer, songwriter, and producer
- Ronnie McDowell (born 1950), American country music artist
- Ronnie McFall (born 1947), Northern Irish former footballer and former manager
- Ronnie McKinnon (1940–2023), Scottish professional footballer
- Ronnie McLean (born 1985), British-American rugby union player
- Ronnie McMahan (born 1972), American former professional basketball player
- Ronnie McMahon (1942–2010), Irish Olympic equestrian
- Ronnie McNeir (born 1949), American singer and songwriter; member of vocal group Four Tops
- Ronnie McNutt (1987–2020), American Iraq War veteran who filmed his suicide online
- Ronnie McQuilter (born 1970), Scottish former professional footballer
- Ronnie Meyjes, Dutch past member of rock- and pop band Earth and Fire
- Ronnie Miller (1941–1996), English cricketer
- Ronnie Mills (born 1951), American former Olympic swimmer
- Ronnie Milne (1921–2014), British-born Canadian singer, band director, musician, composer, musical arranger, and music teacher
- Ronnie Milsap (born 1943), American country music singer and pianist
- Ronnie Montrose (1947–2012), American musician and guitarist
- Ronnie Moore (born 1953), English football manager and former player
- Ronnie Moore (speedway rider) (1933–2018), New Zealand international motorcycle speedway rider
- Ronnie Moran (1934–2017), English footballer
- Ronnie Morris, several people
- Ronnie Mosley (born 1991), American politician
- Ronnie Mund, American staff member on The Howard Stern Show
- Ronnie Murphy (born 1964), American former NBA player
- Ronnie Murphy (footballer) (born 1962), Irish soccer player
- Ronnie Musgrove (born 1956), American lawyer and politician
- Ronnie Mutimusekwa (1955–1992), Zimbabwean HIV/AIDS activist
- Ronnie N. Sutton (born 1941), Native American former politician
- Ronnie Napier (born 1963), Scottish Olympic curler
- Ronnie Nasralla (1930/1931–2021), Jamaican record producer and businessman
- Ronnie Nathanielsz (1935–2016), Sri Lankan-born Filipino sports journalist, commentator, and analyst
- Ronnie Noan, Papua New Guinean Olympic boxer
- Ronnie Nolan (1933–2023), Irish footballer
- Ronnie Nunn, American former NBA referee
- Ronnie Nyakale (born 1973), South African actor, MC, and entrepreneur
- Ronnie Nyogetsu Reishin Seldin (1947–2017), American shakuhachi player
- Ronnie O'Bard (born 1958), American former NFL player
- Ronnie O'Brien (born 1979), Irish retired footballer
- Ronnie O'Neal III, American murderer
- Ronnie O'Neal IV, American surviving victim of the Riverview murders
- Ronnie O'Reilly (?–2015), Irish cricket umpire
- Ronnie O'Sullivan (born 1975), English professional snooker player
- Ronnie Ortegon (born 1966), American professional baseball player, coach, and manager
- Ronnie Ortiz-Magro (born 1985), American television personality, actor, and businessman; cast member of reality TV series Jersey Shore (TV series)
- Ronnie Osmer (born 1999), American professional stock car racing driver
- Ronnie Palmer (born 1986), American former UFL player
- Ronnie Paris (2001–2005), American murder victim
- Ronnie Park (1933–1991), Scottish cyclist
- Ronnie Pascale (born 1976), American retired soccer player
- Ronnie Peacock (born 1950), American former college football coach
- Ronnie Peel (1946–2020), Australian guitarist, singer, and songwriter
- Ronnie Penque (born 1962), American bassist, singer, and songwriter
- Ronnie Pereira (?–2006), Malaysian musician
- Ronnie Peret (born 1947), American former basketball player
- Ronnie Perkins (born 1999), American NFL- and UFL player
- Ronnie Peterson (1944–1978), Swedish racing driver
- Ronnie Peterson (politician) (born 1952), American politician
- Ronnie Pettersson (born 1971), Swedish retired professional ice hockey player
- Ronnie Pfeffer (born 1992), Canadian former CFL player
- Ronnie Phillips (1947–2002), English professional footballer
- Ronnie Platt (born 1962), American singer; member of rock band Kansas (band)
- Ronnie Polkingharn, American uncle of rapper Eminem
- Ronnie Pop (1955–2023), Australian rock singer and songwriter
- Ronnie Potgieter (1943–2021), South African international rugby union player
- Ronnie Poulton (1889–1915), English rugby union footballer; killed in World War I
- Ronnie Powell (American football) (born 1974), American former professional football player
- Ronnie Price (born 1983), American former NBA player
- Ronnie Prophet (1937–2018), Canadian-American country musician and comedy performer
- Ronnie Prude (born 1982), American former professional football player
- Ronnie Quillian (1934–2016), American CFL player
- Ronnie Quintarelli (born 1979), Italian racing driver
- Ronnie Radford (1943–2022), English footballer
- Ronnie Radke (born 1983), American singer, songwriter, record producer, and rapper
- Ronnie Radonich (born 1957), Chilean football manager and former player
- Ronnie Ramos (born 1946), Puerto Rican Olympic sailor
- Ronnie Rancifer (born 1952), American keyboardist, musician, and songwriter
- Ronnie Randell (1886–1978), South African cricketer and lawyer
- Ronnie Ray (born 1954), American retired sprinter
- Ronnie Ray Smith (1949–2013), American Olympic sprinter
- Ronnie Reed (1916–1995), British radio engineer during World War II
- Ronnie Rees (1944–2023), Welsh professional footballer
- Ronnie Reniers (born 1987), Dutch footballer
- Ronnie Ricketts, Filipino actor, scriptwriter, film director, line producer, martial artist, and former government official
- Ronnie Rivers (born 1999), American NFL player
- Ronnie Robertson (1937–2000), American Olympic figure skater
- Ronnie Robinson, several people
- Ronnie Roemisch, American former college football player and coach
- Ronnie Rogers, American country music singer-songwriter
- Ronnie Romero (born 1981), Chilean singer
- Ronnie Ronalde (1923–2015), English music hall singer and siffleur
- Ronnie Rondell Jr. (1937–2025), American actor, director, stuntman, and stunt coordinator
- Ronnie Rooke (1911–1985), English footballer
- Ronnie Ross (1933–1991), Indian-born British jazz baritone saxophonist
- Ronnie Rowe, several people
- Ronnie Rüeger (born 1973), Swiss former Olympic NL player and current coach
- Ronnie Sadomba (born c. 1940), Zimbabwean politician and educator
- Ronnie Sales (1920–1995), English footballer
- Ronnie Sandlin (born 1986/1987), Mexican-born American Internet marketer and convicted felon
- Ronnie Schell (1931–2026), American actor and stand-up comedian
- Ronnie Schneider (1943–2023), American business manager, producer, and Web developer
- Ronnie Schneider (tennis) (born 1994), American tennis player
- Ronnie Schwartz (born 1989), Danish former professional footballer
- Ronnie Scott (1927–1996), English jazz saxophonist and jazz club owner
- Ronnie Scott (songwriter) (1927–1996), British pop music promoter, group manager, and songwriter
- Ronnie Screwvala (born 1956), Indian entrepreneur, businessman, investor, and film producer
- Ronnie Scribner (born 1966), American former actor
- Ronnie Scrima, American dragster and engineer
- Ronnie Segev, American founder of classical music group Ten O'Clock Classics
- Ronnie Selby Wright (1908–1995), Scottish minister
- Ronnie Self (1938–1981), American singer-songwriter and guitarist
- Ronnie Sessions (1948–2025), American country music singer
- Ronnie Sewell (1890–1945), English professional footballer
- Ronnie Shade (1938–1986), Scottish professional golfer
- Ronnie Shakes (1947–1987), American stand-up comedian
- Ronnie Shanklin (1948–2003), American NFL player
- Ronnie Sharp (born 1957), Scottish PDC player
- Ronnie Sharp (footballer) (born 1948), Scottish NASL player
- Ronnie Shavlik (1933–1983), American NBA player
- Ronnie Sheed (1947–2018), Scottish footballer
- Ronnie Shelton (1961–2018), American convicted serial rapist
- Ronnie Shields (born 1958), American former professional boxer and current boxing trainer
- Ronnie Shields (American football) (born 1991), American retired college football player
- Ronnie Shikapwasha (1947–2024), Zambian military officer and cabinet official
- Ronnie Shows (born 1947), American educator and former politician
- Ronnie Sianturi (born 1965), Indonesian singer and actor
- Ronnie Sidney, II (born 1983), American graphic novelist, outpatient therapist, and public speaker
- Ronnie Silk (born 1983), American professional stock car racing driver
- Ronnie Silver (born 1951), American former stock car racer and crew chief
- Ronnie Simmons (born 1988), Australian guitarist
- Ronnie Simpson (1930–2004), Scottish footballer and coach
- Ronnie Sinclair (born 1964), Scottish former professional footballer
- Ronnie Singer (1928–1953), American jazz guitarist
- Ronnie Singh, American video game content creator, podcaster, and brand ambassador
- Ronnie Skelton, British Virgin Islands politician
- Ronnie Slevin (born 1941), Irish retired hurler
- Ronnie Sox (1938–2006), American drag racer
- Ronnie Spafford (1928–2014), British Army officer and philatelist
- Ronnie Stam (born 1984), Dutch former professional footballer
- Ronnie Stanley (born 1994), American NFL player
- Ronnie Starling (1909–1991), English footballer
- Ronnie Steel (1929–2009), English footballer
- Ronnie Steine, American former mayor
- Ronnie Stephen Lillard, real name of Reconcile (rapper) (born 1989), American hip hop recording artist
- Ronnie Stephenson (1937–2002), English jazz drummer
- Ronnie Stern (born 1967), Canadian former NHL player
- Ronnie Steven Islam (born 1990), American Muslim minister
- Ronnie Stonham (1927–2014), British Army personnel
- Ronnie Stringwell, English former cyclist
- Ronnie Stutter (born 2005), English footballer
- Ronnie Sundin (born 1970), Swedish former NHL player
- Ronnie Sundin (singer) (1944–2021), New Zealand teen rock singer
- Ronnie Swan (born 1941), Scottish footballer
- Ronnie Tay (born 1963), Singaporean civil servant and former naval officer
- Ronnie Taylor (1924–2018), English cinematographer
- Ronnie Taylor (scriptwriter) (1921–1979), English television- and radio comedy scriptwriter, producer, and director
- Ronnie Theseira (1930–2022), Malaysian Olympic fencer
- Ronnie Thomas (born 1955), American former NASCAR driver
- Ronnie Thomas (basketball) (born 1992), American college basketball coach and former player
- Ronnie Thompson, several people
- Ronnie Thomson (born 1936), Scottish former international rugby union player, former sprinter, and entrepreneur
- Ronnie Tober (born 1945), Dutch singer
- Ronnie Tod (1905–1975), British Army officer during World War II
- Ronnie Todd (born 1935), Scottish former professional footballer
- Ronnie Trucchio (born 1951), American mobster
- Ronnie Turnbull (1922–1966), English footballer
- Ronnie Turner (1911–?), Rhodesian international lawn bowler
- Ronnie Tyler (born 1988), American former college football player
- Ronnie Uys (born 1979), South African rugby union player
- Ronnie V. Lyngdoh, Indian politician
- Ronnie Valentine (born 1957), American former NBA-, CBA-, and USBL player
- Ronnie van Hout (born 1962), New Zealand-born Australian artist and musician
- Ronnie Van Zant (1948–1977), American singer; past member of rock band Lynyrd Skynyrd
- Ronnie Vannucci Jr. (born 1976), American musician; member of rock band The Killers
- Ronnie Verrell (1926–2002), English jazz drummer
- Ronnie Vicente Lagnada (born 1962), Filipino civil engineer and politician
- Ronnie Vint (born 1996), English television personality and semi-professional footballer
- Ronnie Virgets (1942–2019), American writer, commentator, and journalist
- Ronnie Von (born 1944), Brazilian singer-songwriter, television presenter, and actor
- Ronnie Waldman (1914–1978), English radio presenter, television executive, and actor
- Ronnie Waldock (born 1932), English former professional footballer
- Ronnie Walken (born 1943), American actor
- Ronnie Wallwork (born 1977), English former professional footballer
- Ronnie Ward (born 1974), American former NFL player
- Ronnie Warner (born 1965), American actor, writer, producer, and director
- Ronnie Washington (born 1963), American former NFL player
- Ronnie Watt (born 1947), Scottish karate practitioner and coach
- Ronnie Wavehill (c. 1936–2020), Aboriginal Australian rights activist and stockman
- Ronnie Wearmouth (born 1950), Australian former AFL player
- Ronnie Welch (born 1952), English former professional footballer
- Ronnie West (born 1968), American former NFL player
- Ronnie Whelan (born 1961), Irish former professional footballer
- Ronnie Whelan (footballer, born 1936) (1936–1993), Irish international footballer
- Ronnie White (disambiguation), several people
- Ronnie Wilkins (born 1941), American musician and songwriter
- Ronnie Williams, several people
- Ronnie Wilson (1948–2021), American past member of R&B and funk band The Gap Band
- Ronnie Wingo (born 1991), American NFL player
- Ronnie Winter, American member of rock band The Red Jumpsuit Apparatus
- Ronnie Wong (born 1952), Hong Kong politician, businessman, and former Olympic swimmer
- Ronnie Woo (born 1985), American chef, television personality, author, and former model
- Ronnie Wood, several people
- Ronnie Woo Woo (born 1941), American Chicago Cubs fan, and local celebrity in that area
- Ronnie Yell (born 1991), American former NFL player
- Ronnie Young (1947–2019), American politician
- Ronnie Zito (born 1939), American jazz drummer

== Surname ==
=== Female ===
- Julie Ronnie, American television actress
- Mary Ronnie (1926–2023), New Zealand librarian

=== Male ===
- Chris Ronnie (born 1961/1962), English businessman and convicted fraudster

== Fictional characters ==
=== Female ===
- Ronnie Anne Santiago, in the US animated sitcom The Loud House, voiced by Breanna Yde and Izabella Alvarez
- Ronnie Chase, in the US TV sitcom Veronica's Closet, played by Kirstie Alley
- Ronnie Clayton, in the UK TV soap opera Coronation Street, played by Emma Stansfield
- Ronnie Cooke, in the US drama TV series Boston Public, played by Jeri Ryan
- Ronnie Mitchell, in the UK TV soap opera EastEnders, played by Samantha Womack and Lucia De Wan
- Ronnie Stahl, in the Canadian crime drama TV series Blue Murder, played by Tracy Waterhouse
- Ronnie Van Helsing, in the 2004 horror comic book Sword of Dracula

=== Male ===
- Ronnie Bailey, in the UK TV soap opera Coronation Street, played by Vinta Morgan
- Ronnie Beale, in the UK TV soap opera CivvyStreet, played by Chase Marks
- Ronnie Brooks, in the UK police procedural and legal TV program Law & Order: UK, played by Bradley Walsh
- Ronnie Chang, in the US TV series Agents of S.H.I.E.L.D., played by Matt Yuan
- Ronnie Dimestico, in the US daytime TV soap opera General Hospital, played by Ronnie Marmo
- Ronnie Dobbs, in the 2002 US satirical comedy film Run Ronnie Run!, played by David Cross
- Ronnie Gardocki, in the US crime drama TV series The Shield, played by David Rees Snell
- Ronnie Garrett, in the US drama TV series October Road, played by Jonathan Murphy
- Ronnie Hale, in the UK TV soap opera Emmerdale, played by John McArdle
- Ronnie Johns, in the Australian sketch comedy show The Ronnie Johns Half Hour, played by Heath Franklin
- Ronnie Marsden, in the UK TV soap opera Emmerdale, played by Ray Ashcroft
- Ronnie Raymond, a character in DC Comics
- Ronnie Stark, in the US action thriller TV series 24, played by Peter Outerbridge
- Ronnie the Rhino, the mascot of the English professional rugby league club Leeds Rhinos
- Ronnie Vallance, in the James Bond novels
- Ronnie Woodson, in the UK medical soap opera Doctors, played by Seán Gleeson
- Ronnie "Z-Man" Barzell, in the 1970 US satirical musical melodrama film Beyond the Valley of the Dolls, played by John LaZar

== See also ==
- Ronnie (disambiguation)
- Roni (disambiguation)
- Ronny
