= Roni =

Roni may refer to:

== People ==
- Roni (given name), a list of people with the name
- Roni (footballer, born November 1977), Brazilian football midfielder Ronielle Faria Gomes
- Roni (footballer, born 1987), Brazilian football goalkeeper Roni Visnoveski Turola
- Roni (footballer, born January 1991), Brazilian football attacking midfielder Ronei Gleison Rodrigues dos Reis
- David González (footballer, born 1993), sometimes called Roni, Spanish football forward David González Gómez
- Roni (footballer, born 1999), Brazilian football midfielder Roni Medeiros de Moura
- Roni Size, British record producer and DJ Ryan Williams (born 1969)
- Roni Ludwig (Born 2009) Finnish motocross champion

== Other uses ==
- Roni, Jigawa, a local government area in Nigeria
- "Roni" (song), a 1988 single by Bobby Brown
- Roni, the cursed persona of Regina Mills, the Evil Queen on season 7 of ABC's TV series, Once Upon A Time
- Roni (mascot), the mascot for the 1980 Winter Olympics in Lake Placid

== See also ==
- Ron (disambiguation)
- Ronnie (disambiguation)
- Ronny
- Rony
