= Ronnie =

Ronnie may refer to:

- Ronnie (name), a unisex pet name and given name
- "Ronnie" (Four Seasons song), a song by Bob Gaudio and Bob Crewe
- "Ronnie" (Metallica song), a song from the Metallica album Load
- Ronnie Brunswijkstadion, an association football stadium located in Moengo, Suriname

== See also ==
- Ronny (given name)
- Veronica (disambiguation)
- Ronald (disambiguation)
- Ron (disambiguation)
