= Rony =

Given name

Rony is a given name, nickname and surname. Notable people with the name include:

== Given name or nickname ==
- Rony Ahonen (born 1987), Finnish ice hockey defenceman
- Rony Bakale (born 1987), Olympic swimmer from the Republic of the Congo
- Rony Barrak, percussionist, composer, pianist, and arranger
- Rony Mariano Bezerra (born 1984), Brazilian mixed martial artist
- Rony Brauman (born 1950), French physician
- Rony V. Diaz, award-winning Filipino writer
- Rony Fahed (born 1981), professional Lebanese basketball player
- Rony Fernandes, Rony Fernandes da Silva (born 1995), Brazilian football centre-back
- M. Rony Francois, former secretary of the Florida Department of Health
- Rony Gabriel (born 1994), Brazilian politician
- Rony García, Honduran football goalkeeper
- Rony Gruber (born 1963), Israeli film director and screenwriter
- Rony Hanselmann (born 1991), Liechtensteiner footballer
- Rony Lopes (born 1995) (Marcos Paulo Mesquita Lopes), Portuguese footballer
- Rony Martias (born 1980), French professional road bicycle racer
- Rony Morales (born 1978), Honduran football defender
- Rony Oren (born 1953), Israeli animator, claymator and academic
- Rony Padilla, Christian music singer, musician, composer, worship leader from Honduras
- Rony Robinson (born 1940), writer, educationalist and BBC Radio Sheffield presenter
- Rony Schneider, Israeli former professional association footballer
- Rony Sefo (born 1972), New Zealander kickboxer and MMA fighter
- Rony Seikaly (born 1965), retired Lebanese-born American professional basketball player
- R. T. Stanyforth (1892–1964), Army officer and English amateur first-class cricketer
- Rony Talukdar, Bangladeshi cricketer
- Rony Santos (born 1995), Cape Verdean footballer
- Rony (footballer), Ronielson da Silva Barbosa (born 1995), Brazilian football forward

== Surname ==
- Abu Hena Rony (born 1987), Bangladeshi stand-up comedian, actor, presenter and model
- Golam Maula Rony (born c. 1967), Bangladeshi politician and businessman
- Lintu Rony, 21st century Indian-born British actress
- Redoan Rony, Bangladeshi film director, producer and media executive
- Shakhawat Hossain Rony (born 1991), Bangladeshi footballer

== See also ==
- Ronny, given name
- Roni (disambiguation)
- Roney, a surname
- Ronay, an island in Scotland
