= Ronald Gould =

Ronald, Ron or Ronnie Gould may refer to:

- Sir Ronald Gould (trade unionist) (1904–1986), British trade unionist, general secretary of the National Union of Teachers
- Ronald M. Gould (born 1946), American judge
- Ronald Gould (mathematician) (born 1950), American mathematician
- Ron Gould (politician) (born 1965), American politician from Arizona
- Ron Gould (American football) (born 1965), American football player and coach
- Ronnie Gould (born 1982), English footballer
