= Ronnie Baker =

Ronnie Baker may refer to:

- Ronnie Baker Brooks (born 1967), American Chicago blues and soul musician
- Ronnie Baker (sprinter) (born 1993), American track and field sprinter
- Ronnie Baker (musician) (1947–1990), American soul bass guitar player

== See also ==
- Ron Baker (disambiguation)
- Ronald Baker (disambiguation)
