= Slevin =

Slevin may refer to:

- Slevin Kelevra, a character in the 2006 film Lucky Number Slevin
- Ciarán Slevin (born 1986), Irish hurler
- Gerard Slevin (1919–1997), Chief Herald of Ireland
- Jimi Slevin and the Electric Band, an Irish band with drummer Robbie Brennan
- Joseph Richard Slevin (1881–1957), American herpetologist
- Louis S. Slevin (1878–1945), photographer on the Monterey Peninsula
- Maurice Slevin, British oncologist
- Noel Slevin, Irish journalist
- Ronnie Slevin (born 1941), retired Irish sportsperson
- Ted Slevin (1927–1998), English rugby league footballer who played in the 1940s, 1950s and 1960s
