= Ron Todd =

Ron or Ronald Todd may refer to:

- Ron Todd (footballer) (1916–1991), Australian rules footballer for Collingwood and Williamstown
- Ron Todd (trade unionist) (1927–2005), British trade union official
- Ronnie Todd (born 1935), Scottish footballer
