= KJEE =

- Montecito, California; United States
- Broadcast area: Santa Barbara; Oxnard—Ventura
- Frequency: 92.9 MHz
- Branding: 92.9 KJEE

Programming
- Format: Modern rock

Ownership
- Owner: James Evans; (Montecito FM, Inc.)

History
- First air date: March 1994

Technical information
- Licensing authority: FCC
- Facility ID: 43589
- Class: A
- ERP: 820 watts
- HAAT: 270 meters (890 ft)
- Transmitter coordinates: 34.466°N 119.678°W

Links
- Public license information: Public file; LMS
- Website: kjee.com

KJEE (92.9 FM) is a commercial radio station licensed to Montecito, California, United States, andserves the Santa Barbara area. The station is owned by James Evans under the name of licensee Montecito FM, Inc. and airs a modern rock format.

== History ==
KJEE signed on in March 1994 with a modern rock format. Initially, owner James Evans stunted with a variety of formats by playing a different artist each day, eventually choosing to satisfy the unmet demand for alternative rock in the Santa Barbara radio market. During its first few months in operation, KJEE aired with few commercials and did no formal marketing, instead building its audience by appearing at selected local events and through word of mouth. In the Spring 1994 Arbitron ratings report, the first one in which the station appears, KJEE earned a share of 5.6 in the 12+ group in the market and ranked number one among adults 18–34.

Evans hired only three employees to launch KJEE. Original general manager Eddie Gutierrez sold advertising and planned promotions. Programming director/marketing director Heather Luke made all on-air announcements; assistant PD/assistant MD Deanne Saffran reported on local traffic, answered the station's phones, and voiced commercials. All four staff members also worked regular on-air shifts, pre-recording their material at first. Luke departed in June 1995, and Gutierrez and Saffran assumed her PD and MD duties, respectively. In September 1995, KHTY morning personality Ricky Suave joined KJEE as its new APD, hosting the same time slot.

== Concerts ==
Since 2004, KJEE has sponsored an annual series of concerts in the Santa Barbara and Ventura areas featuring alternative rock artists, some of whom originate from the station's listening area.

Bands listed in reverse order of night's performance. Headlining act in bold.

Date	Event	Venue	City	Lineup
Tuesday, June 18, 2004	10th Anniversary Bash	Santa Barbara Bowl	Santa Barbara, California	**311**, The Ataris, Lit, MxPx
Saturday, June 11, 2005	Summer Round-Up	Santa Barbara Bowl	Santa Barbara, California	**Jimmy Eat World**, Hot Hot Heat, Rise Against, The Bravery, Pinback, Pepper, Tegan and Sara, Mad Caddies
Sunday, June 11, 2006	Summer Round-Up	Santa Barbara Bowl	Santa Barbara, California	**The Strokes**, Franz Ferdinand, Yellowcard, Panic! At The Disco, She Wants Revenge, Hard-Fi
Monday, December 11, 2006	Winter Round-Up	Arlington Theater	Santa Barbara, California	**Jet**, Angels & Airwaves, Thirty Seconds to Mars, Timmy Curran (Local Favorite)
Friday, June 8, 2007	Seaside Beach Ball	Ventura County Fairgrounds	Ventura, California	**Chris Cornell**, Queens of the Stone Age, Sum 41, The Bravery, Silversun Pickups, Shiny Toy Guns, Cold War Kids, Plain White T's
Sunday, May 18, 2008	The Return Of The Summer Round-Up	Santa Barbara Bowl	Santa Barbara, California	**The Offspring**, Pennywise, Everlast, Flobots, The Whigs, Rebelution
Sunday, May 17, 2009	Summer Round-Up	Santa Barbara Bowl	Santa Barbara, California	**Kings of Leon**, The Airborne Toxic Event, Far, Iration, White Lies
Saturday, June 12, 2010	Summer Round-Up	Santa Barbara Bowl	Santa Barbara, California	**Sublime with Rome**, Iration, The Dirty Heads, Cage The Elephant, Dead Country, PSUPERBRAIN
Friday, June 3, 2011	Summer Round-Up	Santa Barbara Bowl	Santa Barbara, California	**Cage the Elephant**, Lykke Li, Manchester Orchestra, Peter Bjorn and John, Foster the People, Sleeper Agent
Friday, June 1, 2012	Summer Round-Up	Santa Barbara Bowl	Santa Barbara, California	**Silversun Pickups**, Garbage, The Naked and Famous, Grouplove
Monday, December 10, 2012	Winter Round-Up	Arlington Theater	Santa Barbara, California	**Metric**, Tegan and Sara, Youngblood Hawke, Beware of Darkness
Wednesday, September 18, 2013	Summer Round-Up	Santa Barbara Bowl	Santa Barbara, California	**Blink-182**, New Beat Fund, New Politics, Atlas Genius
Thursday, May 15, 2014	Summer Round-Up	Santa Barbara Bowl	Santa Barbara, California	**311**, Young the Giant, Birds of Tokyo, Big Data
Sunday, May 17, 2015	Summer Round-Up	Santa Barbara Bowl	Santa Barbara, California	**Of Monsters and Men**, Walk the Moon, Banks, Family of the Year, The Blues and Greys
Friday, June 3, 2016	Summer Round-Up	Santa Barbara Bowl	Santa Barbara, California	**Iration**, Fitz and the Tantrums, The Strumbellas, Wolfmother, Fmlybnd
Saturday, June 10, 2017	Summer Round-Up	Santa Barbara Bowl	Santa Barbara, California	**Empire of the Sun**, Bishop Biggs, Judah & the Lion, Soul Majestic
Friday, May 11, 2018	Summer Round-Up	Santa Barbara Bowl	Santa Barbara, California	**Dirty Heads**, Cold War Kids, Awolnation, Law, Dante Elephante
