= Ronnie Cunningham =

Ronnie Cunningham may refer to:

- Ronnie Walter Cunningham (1932–2023), American astronaut, fighter pilot, entrepreneur, and author
- Ronnie Lee Cunningham (1952–2020), American musician
