= Ron Thompson =

Ron Thompson may refer to:

- Ron Thompson (actor) (1941–2024), American actor
- Ron Thompson (blues guitarist) (1953–2020), American blues guitarist
- Ron Thompson (footballer, born 1921) (1921–1988), English football inside forward
- Ron Thompson (footballer, born 1932) (1932–2020), English football wing half
- Ron Thompson (West Virginia politician) (born 1966), American politician from West Virginia
- Ron Thompson (Australian politician) (1917–2006), Australian trade unionist and politician
- Ronald L. Thompson (1899–1986), American politician from Pennsylvania

== See also ==
- Ronnie Thompson (disambiguation)
- Ronald Thomson (disambiguation)
