= Ron Martin =

Ron Martin may refer to:

- Ron Martin (footballer) (1904–1984), Australian rules footballer
- Ron Martin (artist) (born 1943), Canadian painter
- Ron Martin (geographer) (born 1948), British geographer
- Ron Martin (businessman) (born 1953), British businessman and chairman of Southend United Football Club
- Ron Martin (journalist), American journalist
- Ron Martin Angeles, Filipino actor

== See also ==
- Ronnie Martin (Joy Electric)
- Ronnie Martin (ice hockey)
- Ronald Martin (disambiguation)
