= Jason Henderson =

American novelist (born 1971)

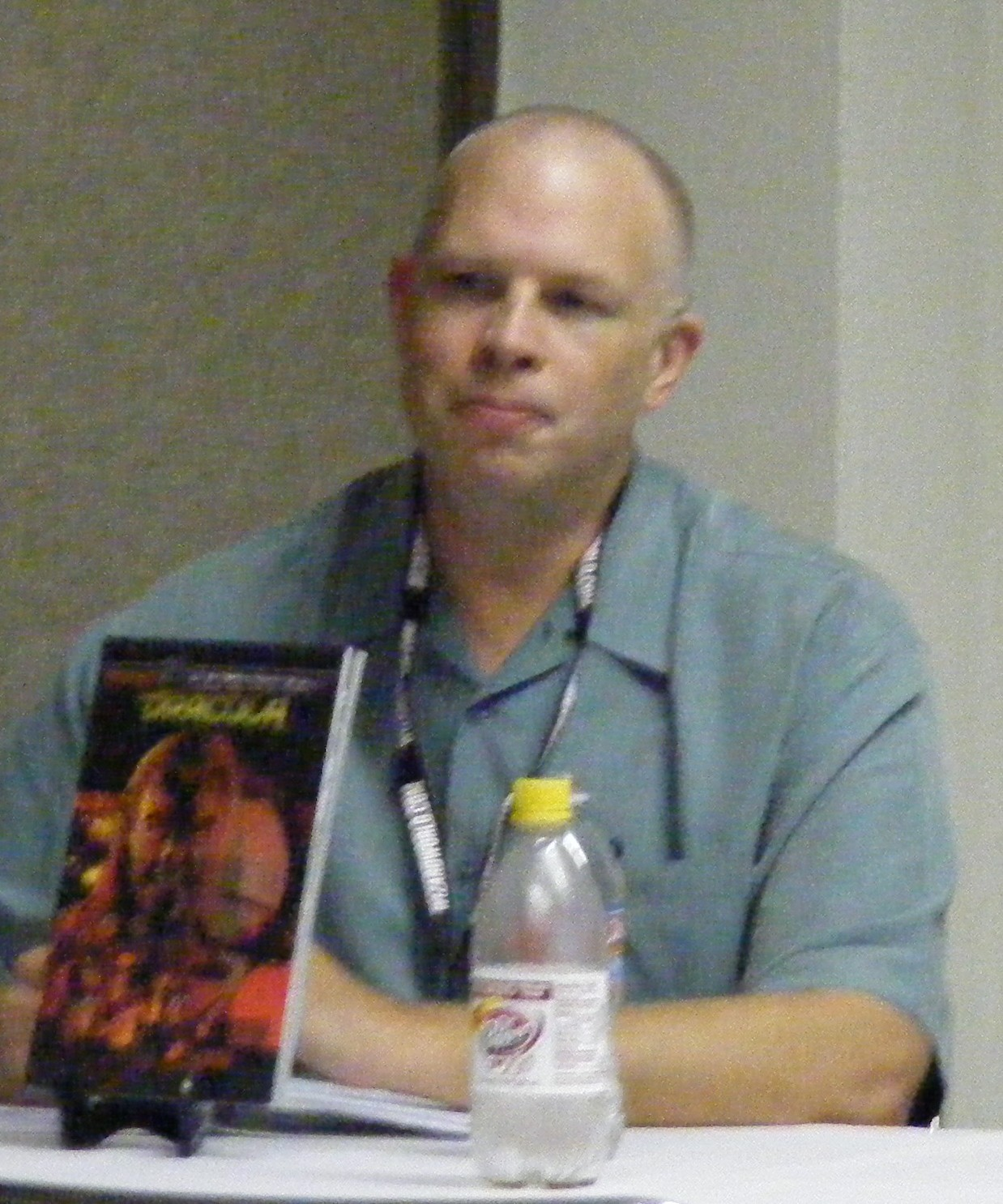
- Henderson at the 2008 Wizard World Texas in New York City, New York
- Born: Jason Douglas Henderson; September 4, 1971 (age 55); Dallas, Texas, U.S.
- Education: University of Dallas (BA); Catholic University of America (JD)
- Occupations: Novelist, comic writer, mangaka, podcaster

Jason Douglas Henderson (born September 4, 1971) is an American writer of computer games, novels and several comic book series.

He is the writer of the young adult novel series Alex Van Helsing from HarperCollins and the comic book series Sword of Dracula from Image Comics, Strange Magic from Marvel Comics, and Soulcatcher. His book Alex Van Helsing: Vampire Rising was added to the 2011 Texas Library Association Lone Star Reading List, a list of the top 20 books published in the previous year for middle grade readers.

He was the writer of Locus best-seller The Element of Fire, the first novel in the Highlander (franchise), and was a co-creator on the Tokyopop manga series Psy-comm. He hosts the cult film podcast Castle of Horror with manga collaborator Tony Salvaggio.

== Personal life ==
Henderson currently resides in Colorado. He graduated from the University of Dallas in 1993 with a BA in History and from Catholic University's Columbus School of Law in 1996 with a Juris Doctor (JD) degree in law.

== Bibliography ==
=== Novels ===
- The Iron Thane, Baen Books, 1993. ISBN 978-0-671-72203-6
- The Spawn of Loki, Baen Books, 1995. ISBN 978-1-55594-073-7
- Highlander: the Element of Fire, Warner Aspect Books, 1995. ISBN 978-0-446-60283-9
- The Incredible Hulk: Abominations, Berkley Books, 1997. ISBN 978-1-57297-273-5
- X-Men/Spider-Man: Time’s Arrow, Book 1 (with Tom DeFalco), Berkley Books, 1998. ISBN 978-0-425-16452-5
- The Darkling Band, Dragon Moon Press, 2007. ISBN 978-1-896944-36-4
- 18 Miles from Town, Castle Bridge Media, 2021. ISBN 978-1-736472668
- Alex Van Helsing
  - Vampire Rising, HarperCollins, 2010. ISBN 978-0-06-195099-5
  - Voice of the Undead, HarperCollins, 2011. ISBN 978-0-06-195101-5
  - The Triumph of Death, HarperCollins, 2012. ISBN 978-0061951039
- Young Captain Nemo
  - Young Captain Nemo, Feiwel & Friends, 2019. ISBN 978-1-250-17322-5
  - Quest for the Nautilus, Feiwel & Friends, 2020. ISBN 978-1-250-17324-9
  - The Serpent's Nest, Feiwel & Friends, 2021. ISBN 978-1-250-17327-0

=== Non-fiction books ===
- California Tiki: A History of Polynesian Idols, Pineapple Cocktails and Coconut Palm Trees (with Adam Foshko), The History Press, 2018. ISBN 9781439664735
- Hollywood Tiki: Film in the Era of the Pineapple Cocktail (with Adam Foshko), The History Press, 2022. ISBN 978-1467149907

=== Graphic novels ===
- Soulcatcher, Alias Comics, 2005. ISBN 978-1-933428-04-8
- Vampire The Masquerade Volume 3: Blood and Loyalty (with Bryan Edwards, Mike Reynolds, Chris Marrinan, Steve Ellis), White Wolf, 2003. ISBN 0-9726443-8-5
- Sword of Dracula, IDW Comics, 2005. ISBN 978-1-932382-70-9
- Hulk: Broken Worlds (with various), Marvel Comics, 2009. ISBN 978-0-7851-4182-2
- What If: Dark Reign, Marvel Comics, 2011. ISBN 978-0-7851-5278-1
- John Carpenter's Night Terrors: Usher Down, Storm King Productions, 2023. ISBN 979-8986480213
- Shadowland: Daughters of the Shadow, Marvel Comics,
  - Volume 1 (illustrated by Ivan Rodriguez), Marvel Comics, 2010.
  - Volume 2 (illustrated by Ivan Rodriguez), Marvel Comics, 2010.
  - Volume 3 (illustrated by Ivan Rodriguez and Jean-Baptiste Andreae), Marvel Comics, 2010.
  - Shadowland: Street Heroes (collects volumes 1–3 with various other comics), Marvel Comics, 2011. ISBN 978-0-7851-4887-6
- Psy-Comm (with Tony Salvaggio)
  - Volume 1 (illustrated by Shane Granger), Tokyopop, 2005. ISBN 978-1-59816-269-1
  - Volume 2 (illustrated by Ramanda Karmaga), Tokyopop, 2007. ISBN 978-1-59816-270-7
  - Volume 3 (illustrated by Ramanda Karmaga), Tokyopop/Right Stuf, 2012. ISBN 978-1427821935
  - Volume 1: Kaplan SAT/ACT Vocabulary-Building Manga, Tokyopop, 2007. ISBN 978-1-4277-5496-7
- Clockwerx (with Tony Salvaggio; illustrated by Jean-Baptiste Hostache)
  - Tome 1: Genese (French Language Version), Humanoids, 2008 (French). ISBN 978-2-7316-1933-1.
  - Tome 2: Deluge (French Language Version), Humanoids, 2009. ISBN 978-2-7316-2255-3
  - Clockwerx Integral, Vol. 1 & 2 (English Language Version), Humanoids, 2013. ISBN 978-1594650390
