= Ron Baker =

Ron Baker may refer to:

- Ron Baker (American football) (born 1954), former NFL offensive lineman
- Ron Baker (basketball) (born 1993), NBA basketball guard
- Ronnie Baker (athlete) (born 1993), American track and field sprinter
- Ronnie Baker (musician) (1947–1990), record producer, bassist, arranger and songwriter
- Ron Bakir (born 1977), Lebanese-Australian entrepreneur
