= Retna =

American artist

RETNA
- Born: Marquis Lewis; 24 March 1979 (age 47); Los Angeles, California, United States
- Known for: Calligraphy, graffiti art
- Website: retna.com

Marquis Duriel Lewis, known professionally as Retna, is an American artist known for calligraphic murals. Emerging from the Los Angeles graffiti scene in the 1990s, he developed a distinctive script fusing elements of Egyptian hieroglyphs, Arabic and Hebrew calligraphy, Gothic blackletter, and Chicano graffiti. His work has been featured on public walls, in gallery exhibitions, on operatic sets, and in collaborations with fashion houses.

== Early life and education ==
Retna was born Marquis Duriel Lewis in Los Angeles in 1979. He grew up in the Mid-City neighborhood and has a mixed African-American, Pipil, Spanish, and Cherokee heritage. As a teenager, he began painting with graffiti crews, including Art Work Rebels (AWR), Mad Society Kings (MSK), and The Seventh Letter. In 1996, he adopted the moniker “Retna” from a Wu-Tang Clan song lyric.

Retna studied letterforms independently, influenced by medieval manuscripts, Art Nouveau, Keith Haring, and Jean-Michel Basquiat.

== Career ==
A mural in Wynwood Arts District, Miami, Florida. 2013.

=== Graffiti and murals ===
Retna's early work consisted of large-scale graffiti in Los Angeles. In 1999, he participated in his first gallery exhibition, Contemporary Corruption. Throughout the 2000s, he became known for murals on buildings in Los Angeles, Miami's Wynwood district, New York City's Bowery/Houston Wall, and a 21-story tower in Mexico City. His public commission for the West Hollywood Park Murals (2011), created with Shepard Fairey and Kenny Scharf, was later recognized by the Americans for the Arts Public Art Network Year in Review program.

Retna is a member of The Seventh Letter collective. His notable collaborations include the 2010 mural Blessed Are The Meek with El Mac. He has also completed murals for Coney Art Walls in Brooklyn and for street-art festivals.

=== Later projects ===
Retna has painted jets for VistaJet, designed scarves for Louis Vuitton, sneakers for Nike, and produced advertising campaigns for Chanel and Helmut Lang. In 2015, he created the album cover artwork for Justin Bieber's album Purpose. Collectors of his canvases include Kevin Huvane, Darren Star, Patrick Dempsey, and Usher.

In 2007, RETNA collaborated with El Mac and Reyeson on the mural “La Reina del Sur” for Art Basel Miami Beach. He painted the façade of the Pasadena Museum of California Art in 2011 for the exhibition Street Cred: Graffiti Art from Concrete to Canvas, and completed the Houston Bowery mural in New York in 2012. In 2018, he created a typographic mural for the Coney Art Walls project in New York.

Retna continued to work internationally through the 2020s, designing murals for Mexico City's Reforma Avenue and for civic projects in Miami and Los Angeles.

=== Gallery exhibitions and installations ===
Retna's 2011 touring exhibition, The Hallelujah World Tour, showcased his work in Los Angeles and Miami. In 2013, he mounted Para mi gente at the Museum of Contemporary Art, Los Angeles (MOCA). He presented solo shows at London's Maddox Gallery in 2017 and 2021. Other exhibitions include La Cuenta Larga in Mexico City (2018) and Margraves (2017) and Love Letter | Carta de Amor at Madison Gallery in San Diego.

In 2016, the Fine Arts Museums of San Francisco invited him to create a site-specific installation at the Legion of Honor for the exhibition The Future of the Past. That same year, he designed monumental projections and backdrops for San Francisco Opera's and Washington National Opera's productions of Verdi's Aida.

== Art style ==
Retna's art is centered on a unique script that combines Egyptian hieroglyphs, Arabic and Hebrew calligraphy, Gothic blackletter, and Los Angeles graffiti lettering. The Economist described it as a fusion of "hieroglyphics, calligraphy and graffiti." His paintings often use a monochromatic palette, such as gold, black, and white.

Retna has stated that his personal heritage informs this visual language and that the script is intended to "unify cultures." His influences include medieval manuscripts, Art Nouveau, Keith Haring, and Jean-Michel Basquiat.

== Legal issues and controversies ==
Lewis has been involved in several high-profile legal disputes, arrests, and allegations of violence throughout his career.

=== Assault and battery incidents ===
In late 2012, Lewis faced three criminal counts of battery following an incident at a Los Angeles art gallery where he allegedly physically assaulted three employees. In July 2013, he faced further accusations of threatening gallery staff, attempting to strangle an employee, and destroying artwork with knives and beer bottles.

In 2014, Lewis was involved in a physical altercation with his then-girlfriend, Brittny Gastineau, in West Hollywood. Gastineau sustained severe facial bruising and a black eye, characterizing the incident as an assault. Lewis's legal counsel asserted the altercation constituted "mutual combat." The couple later released a joint statement declaring they had resolved the matter privately.

In February 2015, Lewis was arrested in West Hollywood for battery after allegedly using pepper spray against a photographer outside a restaurant.

=== Vandalism and property damage ===
Lewis has been arrested multiple times for unauthorized painting and property destruction. In February 2016, he was arrested and charged with felony vandalism for spray-painting a luxury furniture showroom in downtown Los Angeles.

In 2018, the Los Angeles Police Department investigated Lewis for felony vandalism following an incident at the Maddox Gallery in West Hollywood. Lewis allegedly defaced the gallery with silver spray paint and threatened staff members after discovering his artwork had been excluded from an exhibition. The damage was estimated between $50,000 and $100,000.

=== Studio eviction and 2025 asset litigation ===
In early 2025, Lewis became involved in a spat regarding the ownership of his artwork following a 5 month rent dispute with his landlord, Victor Ceporius. Following a court judgment, the contents of Lewis's downtown Los Angeles studio—including computers, personal property, and approximately 500 pieces of art—were declared legally abandoned under California civil law and seized by the landlord.

In January 2025, Lewis filed a federal lawsuit against Ceporius and Heritage Auctions to block a scheduled public sale of the seized inventory. The complaint alleged that the defendants intentionally inflated his debts and rejected cash repayment offers so as to force an auction. He characterized the seizure as art theft. Heritage Auctions proceeded with the sale, maintaining that the auction complied fully with California law. Lewis subsequently publicly disputed the legitimacy of the auction, stating that the inventory consisted of incomplete works and items misattributed to his name.

== Personal life ==
Retna identifies with his multicultural heritage. He is married to Veronika Mudra-Lewis, a human rights advocate and the founder of White Ribbon USA.

== Awards and recognition ==
The West Hollywood Park Murals (2011), a collaboration with Shepard Fairey and Kenny Scharf, were selected by the Americans for the Arts Public Art Network Year in Review program. His stage designs for Aida were noted by critics for bridging street art and opera. His paintings have been acquired by public and private collectors.
