= Liberty Correctional Institution =

Prison in Liberty County, Florida

Coordinates: 30°27′55″N 84°51′54″W

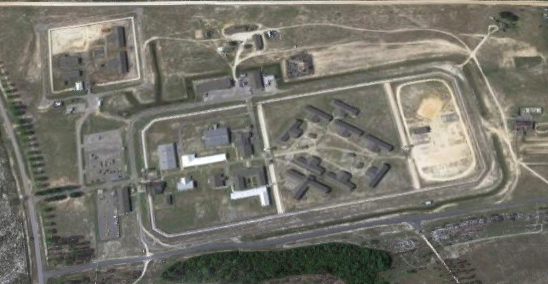
- LIBCI overhead view
- Interactive map of Liberty Correctional Institution
- Location: 11064 NW Dempsey Barron Road Bristol, Florida
- Status: Operational
- Security class: Minimum, medium, and close
- Capacity: 2,113 = 1,273 (main unit) + 840 (satellite units)
- Population: 2,190 = 1,541 (main unit) + 649 (satellite units) (April 2026)
- Opened: 1989
- Managed by: Florida Department of Corrections
- Warden: Joseph Floyd

Liberty Correctional Institution (LIBCI) is a state prison for men located in Bristol, Liberty County, Florida, owned and operated by the Florida Department of Corrections.

Liberty has a mix of security levels, including minimum, medium, and close, for adult male offenders. Liberty first opened in 1989 and has a maximum capacity of 2,113 prisoners.

== Notable Inmates ==
Inmate Name	Register Number	Status	Details
Ronnie O'Neal III	I31195	Serving 3 life sentences without parole.	Perpetrator of the 2018 Riverview murders, in which he killed his ex-girlfriend and daughter, before stabbing his son.
Tyler Hadley	K86680	Serving 2 life sentences without parole.	Perpetrator of the 2011 Murders of Blake and Mary-Jo Hadley, in which he killed his mother and father, then hosted a house party while their hidden bodies remained in the home.
