= Veronica =

Veronica, Veronika, etc., may refer to:

== People ==
- Veronica (name)
- Saint Veronica
- Saint Veronica of Syria

== Arts and media ==
=== Comics and literature ===
- Veronica, an 1870 novel by Frances Eleanor Trollope
- Veronica (novel), a 2005 novel by Mary Gaitskill
- Veronica, an Archie Comics imprint

=== Film, radio, and television ===
- Veronica (1972 film), a Romanian musical film directed by Elisabeta Bostan
- Verónica (2017 Mexican film), a psychological thriller by Carlos Algara and Alejandro Martinez-Beltran
- Verónica (2017 Spanish film), a Spanish horror film
- Veronica D'Costa, a fictional character in the 2012 Indian film Cocktail, portrayed by Deepika Padukone
- Veronica (media), a Dutch media brand
  - Radio Veronica, a Dutch offshore radio station broadcasting from 1960–1974, the origin of the brand
  - Radio Veronica (Sky Radio), a Dutch radio station
  - Veronica TV, a Dutch television station
  - Veronica, now RTL 7, a former Dutch television station
  - Veronica Superguide, a Dutch television Magazine
- Verónica (TV series), a 1980 Mexican telenovela
- Veronika (TV series), a 2024 Swedish television series

=== Music ===
- Veronica (singer) (born 1974), American dance-music singer
- "Veronica" (song), written by Elvis Costello and Paul McCartney, recorded by Costello
- The Veronicas, an Australian pop rock duo
- Veronika (Romanian singer) (born 1984)
- Veronika (Ukrainian singer) (21st century)
- "Veronika (song)", 2024 song by Slovenian singer Raiven

== Botany ==
- Veronica (plant), a genus of flowering plant
  - Shrubby veronicas, the species in Veronica sect. Hebe, native to New Zealand

== Other uses ==
- Verónica, Buenos Aires, town in Argentina
- Verónica (bullfighting), matador's move
- Veronica (mountain), also called Willka Wiqi, a mountain in Peru
- Veronica (search engine), search engine for the Gopher protocol
- Veronika (cow), a cow that has used tools
