= Brainchild (band) =

American progressive rock band

- Origin: Youngstown, Ohio, United States
- Genres: Rock, progressive rock
- Years active: 1969–1972
- Label: None
- Past members: Joe Pizzulo; Larry Paxton; Ronny Lee; Danny Marshall; Bill Bodine; John Grazier; Odie Crook; Dave Freeland

Brainchild was a Youngstown, Ohio-based supergroup formed in the late 1960s, who were active for about three years. Towards the end of their time, they were playing with major acts.

== Background ==
Not to be confused with the early 1970s English jazz-rock group, Brainchild from Somerset in England, this group was made up of musicians from the Youngstown area in Ohio, United States. They came together in 1969. Three of the main members were from a group called Roadshow. They were, founding member Joe Pizzulo on vocals, Dan Marshall on keyboards and Larry Paxton on guitar. John Grazier the drummer came from an outfoot called the Insights. Ronnie Lee Cunningham who played keyboards had led his own band. Bass player Bill Bodine had been with a group called the Citations.

The group would play at the local clubs such as, The Apartment, Gazebo Room and Varsity Club. Later, having moved up the chain, they would play at venues with Sly and the Family Stone, Three Dog Night and Ted Nugent.

Original members consisted of vocalist Joe Pizzulo, guitarist Larry Paxton, bassist Bill Bodine, drummer John Grazier, and keyboardists Ronny Lee and Danny Marshall. Later members were vocalist/drummer Dave Freeland, and vocalist "Odie" Crook. Freeland had been a member of the quintet, The Incorporated Few.

== Career ==
Keyboardist Ronny Lee would later join another group from Youngstown called Law, who would become the opening act for The Who. According to an interview with Law's founder Steve Acker, he had become friends with Cunningham who had just left Branchild. Acker's bandmate Mickey Williamson had quit the band Law. He called Cunningham, who joined the band immediately which got them out of trouble.

The group disbanded at the end of 1972.

Joe Pizzulo moved to California in 1974 and started his new group, White Licorice. Vocalist Pizzulo went on to achieve massive success in the early/mid-1980s as a member of Sergio Mendes' band, providing lead vocals on the smash hits "Never Gonna Let You Go" and "Alibis," among others.

Nearly 30 years after their break up Brainchild members reunited in 2002 for a series of charity concerts.
