= Ronald Woods =

Ronald Woods may refer to:

- Ronald Woods (rugby league), see List of Manly-Warringah Sea Eagles players
- Ron Woods (born 1943), American former MLB player

== See also ==
- Ronald Wood (disambiguation)
