= Ronald Baker =

Ronald Baker may refer to:

- Ronald L. Baker (1937–2023), American folklorist
- Ronald James Baker (1924–2020), president of the University of Prince Edward Island
- Ronald John Baker (1912–1990), Canadian engineer
- Ron Baker (American football) (born 1954), offensive lineman for the Baltimore Colts and the Philadelphia Eagles
- Ronnie Baker (musician) (1947–1990), American record producer, bassist, arranger and songwriter
- Ronnie Baker (athlete) (born 1993), American track and field athlete
