= Ronnie Burns =

Ronnie, Ronald or Ron Burns may refer to:

== Sports ==
- Ronald Burns (athlete) (1903–1985), Indian Olympic sprinter
- Ronnie Burns (footballer) (born 1973), former Australian rules footballer
- Ronald Burns (swimmer) (1933–1999), British Olympic swimmer
- Ron Burns (soccer), Australian soccer player

== Others ==
- Ronnie Burns (actor) (1935–2007), part-time actor, adopted son of George Burns and Gracie Allen
- Ronnie Burns (singer) (born 1946), Australian pop singer

== See also ==
- Ronnie Byrne (1900–1966), Australian VFL player
