= 2019 Miramar shootout =

Car jacking, kidnapping, police chase, and shootout in Florida

- Miramar (Florida) Miramar (the United States)
- Location: Miramar, Florida, U.S.
- Date: December 5, 2019
- Attack type: Police pursuit, shootout
- Weapon: .40-caliber Glock 22 w/ suppressor
- Deaths: 4 (including both perpetrators)
- Injuries: 1
- Perpetrators: Lamar Alexander; Ronnie Jerome Hill

On December 5, 2019, a police pursuit of jewelry store robbers in Miramar, Florida, United States, culminated in a shootout, killing the perpetrators, the kidnapped driver of a UPS multi-stop truck (which they had carjacked), and a bystander. The crime scene was described as "very complicated" by the FBI special agent in charge. The president of Miami-Dade's police union claimed that at least eleven officers opened fire on the UPS truck in response to the robbers' firing first.

== Robbery ==
At approximately 4:14 p.m., Lamar Alexander and Ronnie Jerome Hill robbed the jewelry store, Regent Jeweler at Miracle Mile in Coral Gables, Florida. They held the store's cashier at gunpoint and stole diamonds. The two suspects exchanged gunfire with the store owner during the robbery, injuring one jewelry shop worker and hitting nearby Coral Gables City Hall with a stray bullet, causing that building to be placed on lock down. Hill was wounded by the jewelry store owner during the gunfight.

Police were alerted when the store's silent alarm system went off. Ninety seconds later, when officers arrived, the gunmen opened fire on the officers, who then returned fire on the gunmen. The gunmen left in a U-Haul van, which they later ditched in a suburban neighborhood one mile away. The suspects then carjacked a UPS delivery truck at gunpoint and took the driver hostage. The two continued their escape in the UPS truck, heading on Interstate 75 into Broward County.

== Shootout ==
Several police cars pursued the suspects until the UPS truck became boxed in by slow-moving rush hour traffic in Miramar, about 20 miles (32 km) north of the jewelry store. Police then took cover behind the cars containing bystanders and later claimed the suspects opened fire first; however, the lawyer representing the two innocent victims of the shooting cites witness testimony that the police shot first. A total of nineteen officers fired at the suspects, including thirteen members of the Miami-Dade Police Department. The other six officers were from the Miramar Police Department and the Pembroke Pines Police Department. The pursuit and shootout were broadcast live on television by news helicopters.

In 2024, important details were finally revealed: A total of 20 officers from 4 different agencies fired upwards of 221 bullets in a span of 25 seconds. Hill was struck 40 times, and Alexander shot himself. Ordonez was struck 12 times, and the 5 bullets that stayed in his body were all traced to police weapons. Cutshaw was struck once in the back of the head, which was also traced back to police.

== Victims ==
Four people were killed in the shootout. Both robbery suspects, Lamar Alexander, and Ronnie Jerome Hill, both 41, were killed by police. The hijacked UPS driver, Frank Ordonez, 27, and bystander Richard Cutshaw, 70, were also both killed in the shootout; A female store employee was shot and wounded in the initial robbery.

== Response ==
The sister of Ordonez expressed her anger that the police responded quickly with gunfire, and did not attempt to negotiate the hostage situation, which she believed caused her brother's death. At a vigil the following year, Ordonez's brother said, "The police murdered my brother on live TV and we all had to watch in horror." Lawsuits were later filed on behalf of Ordonez and Cutshaw, alleging that the police agencies involved had behaved negligently. The litigation stalled due to the COVID-19 pandemic.

Florida Department of Law Enforcement finished their investigation on September 17, 2021, and turned the case over to the Broward state attorney's office. In 2024, four officers were indicted in connection with the shootout. Their names and charges were not immediately released.

Police officers Jose Mateo, Rodolfo Mirabal, Richard Santiesteban, and Leslie Lee have all been charged in June 2024 with Manslaughter because the bullets that killed the two innocent victims were traced back to their weapons, which were discharged a combined total of nearly 90 times during the shootout, and all four have so far pled not guilty to all of the charges.

In September 2025, Officer Mateo was cleared of wrongdoing by Judge Ernest Kollra.

== See also ==
- 1986 FBI Miami shootout
