= Ronald Lee (disambiguation) =

Ronald Lee (1934–2020) was a Romani-Canadian writer, linguist, professor, folk musician, and activist.

Ronald Lee or variation, may also refer to:

== Sports ==
- Ronald Lee (cricketer) (1876–1940), English cricketer
- Ron Lee (American football) (born 1953), American football running back
- Ronnie Lee (American football) (born 1956), American football offensive tackle and tight end
- Ronnie Lee South (born 1945), American former NFL player
- Ron Lee (born 1952), American basketball player

== Others ==
- Ronald A. Lee (1912–1990), British philatelist
- Ronnie Lee (born 1951), British animal rights activist and the founder of the Animal Liberation Front
- Ronnie Lee Cunningham (1952–2020), American musician
- Ronnie Lee Gardner (1961–2010), American criminal who was executed
- Ronny Lee (1927–2015), American music teacher and guitarist
- Ronald B. Lee (1932–2020), American postmaster, executive and army major

== See also ==
- Ron Lea (born 1952), Canadian actor
- Veronica "Ronnie" Lee, in the Canadian TV sitcom Schitt's Creek, played by Karen Robinson
