= Murders of Blake and Mary-Jo Hadley =

2011 parricide in Florida

- Location: Port St. Lucie, Florida, U.S.
- Date: July 16, 2011; 15 years ago
- Attack type: Parricide by bludgeoning
- Weapon: Hammer
- Victims: Blake and Mary-Jo Hadley
- Perpetrator: Tyler Hadley
- Motive: Resentment for inpatient drug treatment
- Verdict: Pleaded no contest
- Convictions: First-degree murder (2 counts)
- Sentence: Life imprisonment with review eligible in 25 years (Note: Overturned from two consecutive life sentences without the possibility of parole.)

On July 16, 2011, in Port St. Lucie, Florida, Blake Hadley, 54, and Mary-Jo Hadley, 47, were murdered by Tyler Hadley, their 17-year-old son. Three years later, he was convicted of the murders, and sentenced to life in prison.

== Murder ==
A few weeks prior to the murders, Tyler Hadley allegedly told a friend that having a big party after a parricide had "never been done before."

On the evening of 16 July 2011, Tyler wrote on his Facebook wall, "party at my crib tonight...maybe." Shortly after noon, Tyler sent out invitations to a party. He funded the party with his parents' credit cards (he was spotted by an ATM when his photo was taken as he pulled money out of the accounts) and picked up a few friends.

After Blake and Mary-Jo returned home, Tyler hid their phones and locked their black Labrador (who he suspected would defend his parents) in a closet. Shortly before 5:00 p.m., he took three pills of ecstasy and then stood behind his mother, Mary-Jo, as she worked on her computer in the family room. He attacked his mother with a claw hammer. Hearing the screams, his father rushed out of the bedroom. Blake saw Tyler attacking Mary-Jo and asked why Tyler was doing this. Tyler replied, "Why the fuck not?" before fatally attacking his father with the hammer. After murdering them, he dragged their bodies into the master bedroom and spent three hours cleaning up the blood and throwing household items and furniture on top of their bodies.

The party commenced at Tyler's house that night. Around 60 people attended the party that night, and several people are alleged to have noticed "the smell of dead bodies". During the party, Tyler went on a walk with a close friend and confessed the crime. After returning to the party, the friend discovered the bodies of Blake and Mary-Jo in the master bedroom. The friend spent 45 minutes with Tyler and took a selfie with him. Four hours later, the friend left the party and called a local crime hotline to report the murders. News of the crime spread by word of mouth. Hadley was arrested early the next morning.

== Perpetrator ==
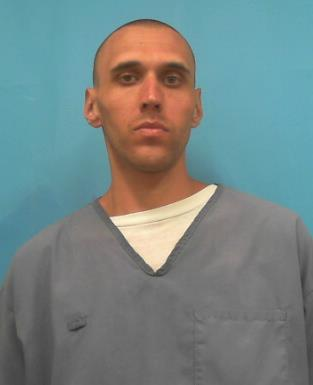
Tyler Hadley's mugshot from the Florida Department of Corrections.

Tyler Joseph Hadley was born on 16 December 1993. At the time of the murders, he was 17 years old. During his teenage years, Hadley began skipping school and taking drugs. His sentencing documents indicate he had been involved in various drug-related crimes, including drug use, sales, and purchases. He had also had been criminally detained for arson, vandalism, theft, and aggravated battery. There was also a $15,000 civil suit pending after Tyler had hit and injured a child while driving his father's car in June 2010.

Prior to the murders of his parents, Hadley had been enrolled in an outpatient drug treatment program, which proved to be unsuccessful. Knowing their son would soon become a legal adult and desperate to get him help, his parents had recently found an inpatient drug treatment program for him. This was later reported to be the motive for the murders, as Hadley did not want to participate in the program.

== Convictions ==
Hadley pleaded no contest to two counts of first-degree murder, resulting in his conviction. As Hadley was a minor, he could not be sentenced to death by Florida law, and capital punishment for minors had been abolished nationwide in 2005. In 2014, he was initially sentenced to two consecutive terms of life imprisonment without the possibility of parole. While in jail awaiting sentencing, Tyler spent his time signing autographs for fellow inmates. He would take a news article about the murder and write, "It's Hammer Time" across the article and sign with his self-proclaimed nickname "Hammer Boy".

In April 2014, his sentencing was overturned by an appeal judge who stated the lower court "did not consider the correct alternative to a life sentence". Miller v. Alabama had recently been handed down by the Supreme Court, which changed how juvenile murderers were reviewed by the judicial system. When sentencing occurred, the judicial review mechanism was not yet in place, and Hadley was entitled to a judicial review at in the future.

In December 2018, after proper judicial review, Hadley was resentenced to life in prison. Hadley is imprisoned at Liberty Correctional Institution.

== Aftermath ==
In April 2015, the Hadley house was demolished.
