= Ronnie Thompson =

Ronnie Thompson may refer to:

- Ronnie Thompson (American football) (born ca. 1944), American football coach
- Ronnie Thompson (politician) (1934–2020), American politician and mayor of Macon, Georgia
- Ronnie Thompson, pseudonymous author of the 2008 book Screwed: The Truth About Life as a Prison Officer
- Ronnie Thompson (director), co-director of the 2012 film Tower Block
- Ronny Thompson (born 1969), American basketball coach and sports broadcaster

== See also ==
- Ron Thompson (disambiguation)
- Ronald Thomson (disambiguation)
