= Ronald Campbell =

Ronald Campbell may refer to:

- Ronald Bruce Campbell (1878–1963), British fencer
- Ronald Hugh Campbell (1883–1953), British diplomat and ambassador to France on the eve of World War II
- Ronald Ian Campbell (1890–1983), British diplomat and former ambassador to Egypt
- Ronald Kent Campbell (1934–2017), American politician, member of the Kansas House of Representatives
- Ronnie Campbell (1943–2024), British Labour MP for Blyth Valley
- Ronnie R. Campbell (1954–2022), American politician, member of the Virginia House of Delegates
- Ron Campbell (ice hockey) (Ronald Campbell, born 1957), American National Hockey League (NHL) executive
- Ron Campbell (animator) (1939–2021), Australian animator, director, and producer
- Ron Campbell (baseball) (1940–2023), American MLB player
- Ron Campbell (referee) (1936–2026), English rugby league referee and player

== See also ==
- Ronald Campbell Gunn (1808–1881), English-born Australian botanist and politician
