= Sword of Dracula =

2004 American horror comic book

Sword of Dracula is a 2004 horror comic book published by several American companies, including Image Comics, IDW Publishing, and Digital Webbing. The series focuses on a group of UN connected commandos called the Polidorium. The series is created by writer Jason Henderson and includes a round-robin group of artists, including Greg Scott, Terry Pallot, and James Fry (as William Belk). Matt Webb colored one issue of the second volume. Covers were provided by Tony Harris and Greg Scott.

In the series, vampires are allegories for terrorists, with Dracula presented as "the Osama bin Laden of vampires" and a war criminal. The comic also gives Dracula more enhanced powers, including the ability to control human blood with his mind, and even make buildings and weapons out of "bloodwood," or mind-controlled blood.

In August 2004, the comic featured Senator John Kerry in a flash-back to Vietnam, in which Kerry led a PT boat hunt for Dracula.

In October and December 2004, Sword of Dracula's Ronnie Van Helsing appeared in a two-part Vampirella story drawn by Greg Scott.

On March 7, 2007, a front page Wall Street Journal article cited Sword of Dracula comics.
