= Ronald (disambiguation) =

Ronald is a masculine given name.

Ronald may also refer to:

- Ronald, Minnesota, an unincorporated community in the United States
- Ronald, Washington, an unincorporated community in the United States

== See also ==
- Ronald Township, Michigan, a civil township in the United States
