= Ronnie Dean Tinsley =

American singer-songwriter

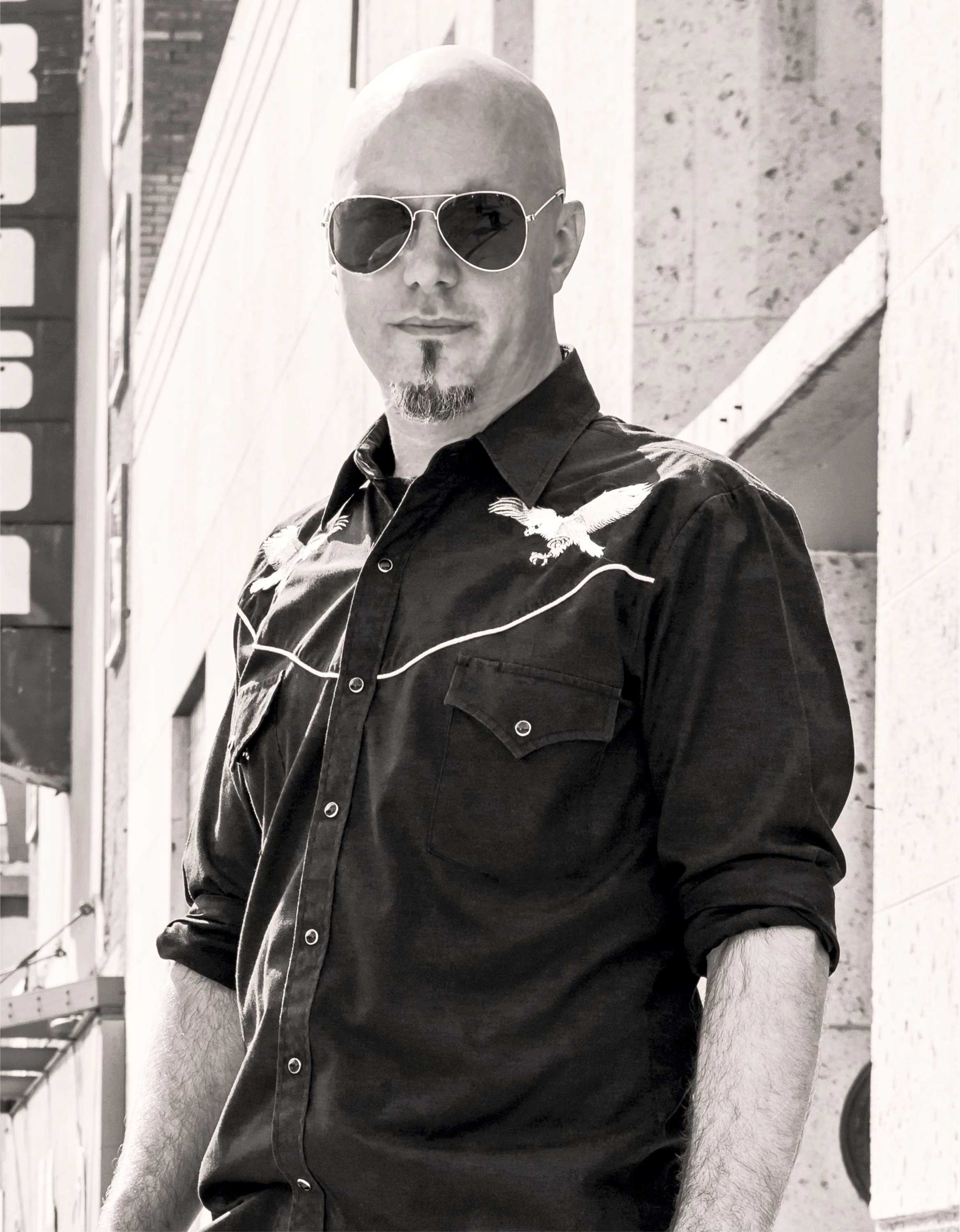

Background information
- Birth name: Ronnie Dean Tinsley, II
- Born: June 17, 1975 (age 50); Houston, Texas
- Genres: Rock, Metal, Alt-Metal, Outlaw Country, Americana, Ameritopia
- Occupation(s): Musician, songwriter, entrepreneur
- Instrument(s): Guitar, vocals
- Years active: 2000's
- Labels: The Black Light District,
- Website: ronniedeantinsley.com

Ronnie Dean Tinsley is a singer/songwriter as a solo artist in the outlaw country, Americana, Metal genres. He also owns and operates a service, construction, design, and maintenance company based in Texas.

== Musical Artist ==
After founding Houston-based metal band "The Hectic" with Ken Pride in 2003 as the lone guitarist, Tinsley moved to lead singer/songwriter (Ronnie Tinsley ASCAP) after parting ways with original singer James Hook, The Hectic, as lead singer, and songwriter/lyricist. He recorded the EP Reborn with that band which contained 4 originals by Tinsley.

Seven years later, in 2010 he wrote 11 songs for The Hectic's self-titled debut album also released and published by The Black Light District (ASCAP) with Brian Baker of Sound Arts Recording Studio's in Houston, Texas at the production helm having previously worked with artist and labels such as Blue October, Free Radicals, Geto Boys, Epic Records, Columbia Records.

Again with Brian Baker at the production helm, in 2014, Tinsley started writing, producing and recording his debut solo effort "Ronnie Dean Tinsley & The Dark Horse Rodeo" - Album: Renegade. Performing on 10 of the album tracks was Brian Thomas, Anthony Sapp, David Delagarza III of Grammy award winning group La Mafia, Billie Jean Hughes, Tammy Akins and Steve Allison. March 25, 2016, The Black Light District releases a solo album by Tinsley that will have single released to Texas Radio as well as Americana and Ameritopia National/International radio promotions along with world-wide distribution via INGrooves Music Group.

== Film ==
Tinsley appears as an American gang member in two episodes of Despertar contigo featuring Daniel Arenas and has contributed music to several short film projects.

== Business ==
Tinsley is co-founder and owner of The Rice Tinsley Corporation; a large scale commercial, industrial, and residential service, construction, and design company based in Texas along with hospitality and real estate investments.

== Discography ==
- Reborn – The Hectic, 2003, EP The Black Light District
- The Hectic – The Hectic, 2010, LP The Black Light District
- Time On My Hands – The Hectic, 2016, Single The Black Light District
- Renegade – Ronnie Dean Tinsley & The Dark Horse Rodeo, 2015, LP The Black Light District
- Whiskey For Christmas – Ronnie Dean Tinsley & The Dark Horse Rodeo, 2017, Single The Black Light District
- Ain't Livin' On Luck – Ronnie Dean Tinsley & The Dark Horse Rodeo, 2018, EP The Black Light District
- Long Cold Winter's Night – Ronnie Dean Tinsley & The Dark Horse Rodeo, 2021, EP The Black Light District
- 1975 – Ronnie Dean Tinsley & The Dark Horse Rodeo, 2024, EP The Black Light District
