= Riverview murders =

2018 familicide in Florida

- Location of Riverview in Hillsborough County
- Location: 27.8018°N 82.2990°W; Riverview, Florida
- Date: March 18, 2018; 8 years ago 11:43 – 11:53 p.m. (EDT)
- Attack type: Familicide, double-murder, child murder, uxoricide, filicide, attempted murder, shooting, stabbing, arson
- Deaths: 2 (Kenyatta Barron, aged 33; Ron'Niveya O'Neal, aged 9)
- Injuries: 1 (Ronnie O'Neal IV)
- Perpetrator: Ronnie O'Neal III
- Motive: Religious extremism
- Verdict: Guilty on all counts
- Convictions: First-degree murder (x2); Attempted first-degree murder; Aggravated child abuse (x2); Arson
- Sentence: Three consecutive life sentences without the possibility of parole plus 90 years

On March 18, 2018, in Riverview, Florida, 29-year-old Ronnie O'Neal III murdered his ex-girlfriend and daughter and attacked his son, who was critically injured but survived. O'Neal was convicted of two counts of first-degree murder, one count of attempted first-degree murder, two counts of aggravated child abuse, one count of arson, and one count of resisting a law enforcement officer. On July 23, 2021, he was given three consecutive life sentences without the possibility of parole, plus 90 years.

== Events ==
At 11:43 p.m. EDT, the Hillsborough County Sheriff's Office received a 911 emergency call from an unknown woman, now believed to have been Kenyatta. A male caller could be heard in the background saying, "She killed me", "Don’t come outside, call 911 now," and "Allahu akbar". The 911 call ended shortly thereafter.

At 11:51 p.m., a second 911 call came in from a male caller claiming to have been attacked by "white demons" and accusing Kenyatta (addressed as "Ke-Ke" in the call) of trying to kill him, and that he "just killed her." The caller gave their home address.

Deputies arrived at 11:49 p.m. to find a woman, later identified as Kenyatta, lying unconscious in the yard. Ronnie III also attacked his 9-year-old daughter Ron'Niveya with a hatchet, killing her, and stabbed his 8-year-old son Ronnie IV, leaving him critically wounded and then proceeded to set him on fire. Although sustaining multiple critical (stabbing and burn) injuries, Ronnie IV survived the attack and escaped the home. Before being airlifted to a Tampa hospital, Ronnie IV was able to tell detectives on-scene that his father had shot his mother.

Ronnie III resisted arrest until being tasered by police. While inside the squad car, he called his murdered victim Kenyatta "the devil" and said, "the kids are the devil's kids." He was booked into Hillsborough County Jail the next day.

On March 22, 2018, four days after being wounded in the attack, Ronnie IV was interviewed by police.

== Trial and sentencing ==
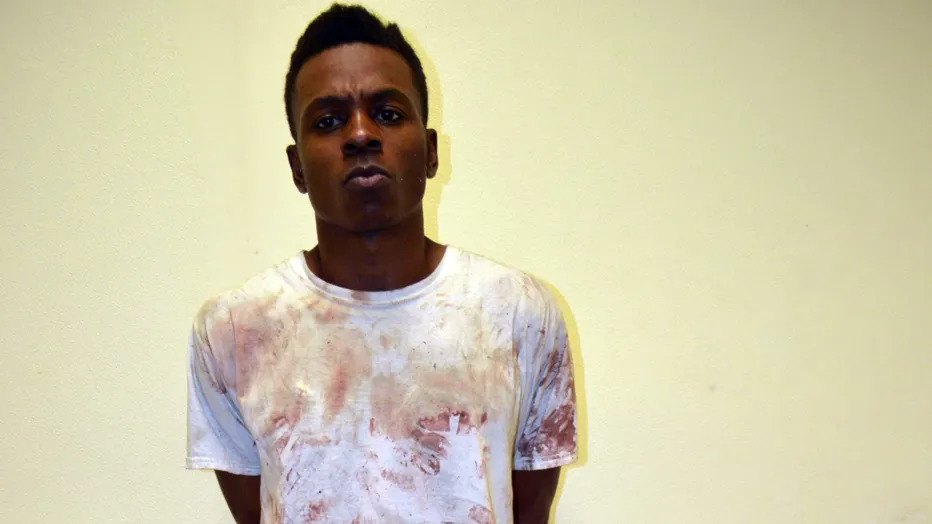
Mugshot of Ronnie O'Neal III

The trial for Ronnie III began on June 16, 2021. He initially served as his own attorney in addition to his counsel, cross-examining his surviving son Ronnie IV, who testified as a witness for the prosecution. In his opening statement, Ronnie III repeatedly raised his voice, and spoke dramatically and aggressively towards the court; Judge Michelle Sisco eventually halted his statement for reasons of profanity after he had used the N-word. He claimed that his son had lied to investigators about the incident, and initially that he did not inflict harm. When Ronnie III was given the opportunity to cross-examine Ronnie IV, he asked "Did I hurt you that night of the incident?" and the boy replied "Yes." Ronnie III then asked him, "How did I hurt you?" The boy replied, "You stabbed me."

Initially, Ronnie III's attorneys filed motions claiming that Ronnie III was acting in self-defense and requesting to defend Ronnie III on the basis of Florida's stand-your-ground law. However, the judge rejected this request, finding Ronnie III ineligible for a stand-your-ground defense. On June 21, 2021, Ronnie III was found guilty of two counts of first-degree murder, one count of attempted first-degree murder, two counts of aggravated child abuse, one count of arson, and one count of resisting a law enforcement officer. On July 23, 2021, he was given three life sentences without the possibility of parole, plus 90 years, running consecutively. He is currently incarcerated at Liberty Correctional Institution in Bristol, Florida.

Reflecting on the case during sentencing, Judge Michelle Sisco described it as the "worst case [she'd] ever seen, as far as the facts go" in her nineteen-year judicial career, and described Ronnie III's actions toward his daughter as "abject cruelty." State Attorney Andrew Warren described the murders as "among the most cruel and vicious our community has ever seen."

== Aftermath ==
On November 25, 2019, Ronnie IV was adopted by detective Mike Blair, who cared for him and interviewed him the night of the murders. Ronnie IV changed his name to Ronnie Blair when he joined the family of seven, including Mike, his wife Danyel, and their five other children, ages 16 to 23. Mike recalled the night of the murders, saying that there was "no expectation Ronnie would live" and that he considers Ronnie's recovery to be a miracle. Of the adoption, Ronnie says that he is "loved" and "part of the family."
