= Ronald Dawson =

Ronald, Ron, or Ronnie Dawson may refer to:

- Ronnie Dawson (baseball) (born 1995), American CPBL player
- Ronnie Dawson (musician) (1939–2003), American rockabilly musician
- Ronnie Dawson (rugby union) (1932–2024), Irish rugby union player; captain of the British Lions team
- Ron Dawson (born 1940), English Special Educational Needs (SEN) educator, psychologist, researcher, and author
