= Rony Padilla =

Honduran contemporary worship music singer

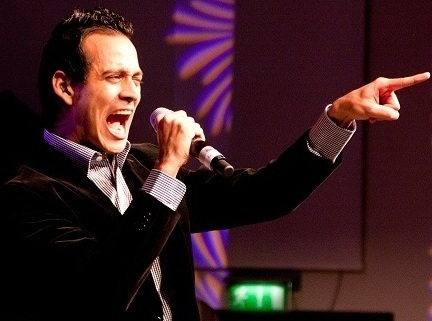
- Born: Honduras, Central America
- Education: Cambridge Theological Federation
- Occupation: Worship Pastor
- Spouse: Karen Padilla

Rony Padilla is a contemporary worship music singer, songwriter and worship pastor from Honduras, Central America.

He serves Union Church Totteridge in London, United Kingdom as a Local Church Leader.

== Biography ==
Padilla began studying the piano at the age of 9 and attended the "Escuela Metropolitana de Musica" (Metropolitan School of Music) in San Pedro Sula. At the age of 16, he became a Christian and during that time he wrote his first songs which are lyrically focused on matters concerned with the Christian faith. Padilla has also worked in commercials, jingles and voice-over material for some of Honduras's top Christian radio stations.

== Career ==
At the end of 2010, Rony became the first Latin American musician to record a live CD/DVD in the United Kingdom; hundreds of people gathered on a live concert at the "Rock Tower" in Islington, London. In June 2012 Rony became the first Latin American singer to perform at the "Big Church Festival", the biggest one-day Christian event in the United Kingdom.

On June 23, 2012 Padilla performed at the HMV Hammersmith Apollo in London, as part of the headlining and supporting acts for Muyiwa Olarewaju. Most recently, he has worked with artists like Evan Craft, Gilberto Daza and Miel San Marcos.

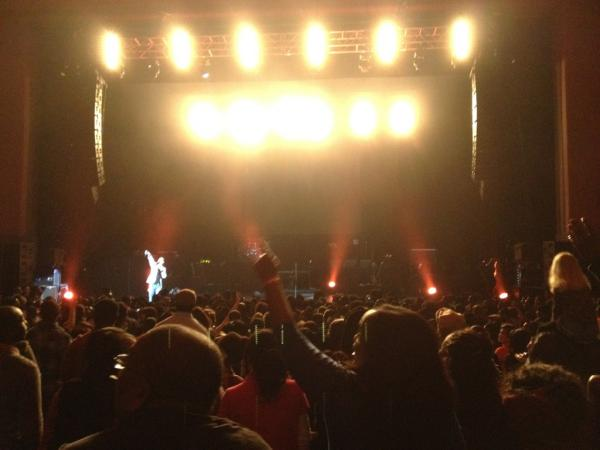
Rony Padilla performing at the Hammersmith Apollo in 2012.

He appeared on the VOX Collective TV series, produced by TBN UK to highlight the heartbeat of diversity, creativity and unity that is alive in the UK worship scene today.

Rony continues to produce and record music as part of the outreach mission at Union Church Totteridge URC.

== Discography ==
- 2008 - Todo Por Cambiar. Los sencillos comienzos de Rony Padilla en el 2003-2008.
- 2011 - Rony Padilla En Vivo Desde Londres. Rony se convierte en el primer artista cristiano en grabar un álbum en vivo desde Londres, Inglaterra
- 2015 - Altar Of Worship, Adoración Acústica .
- 2017 - Único Que Salva (feat. Evan Craft)
- 2018 - Tú Eres Santo (feat. Josh Morales de Miel San Marcos)
- 2022 - Todo A Cristo
- 2024 - No Serán Avergonzados, adorando desde Honduras
- 2026 - Te Amaré - Lanzada por Rony Padilla en el 2007 y re-grabada junto a Gilberto Daza en el 2026
