= Ronnie Bull =

Ronnie Bull may refer to:

- Ronnie Bull (footballer) (born 1980), English former professional footballer
- Ronnie Bull (American football) (born 1940), American retired NFL player
