= Ronald White =

Ronald, Ronnie, or Ron White may refer to:

== Entertainers ==
- Ron White (born 1956), American comedian
- Ron White (actor) (1953–2018), Canadian actor
- Ronnie White (1939–1995), American singer/songwriter/producer

== Judges ==
- Ronald A. White (born 1961), United States district judge for the Eastern District of Oklahoma
- Ronnie L. White (born 1953), United States district judge for the Eastern District of Missouri

== Sports ==
- Ron White (footballer) (1920–1992), Australian rules footballer
- Ronnie White (golfer) (1921–2005), English amateur golfer

== Others ==
- Ron White (lawyer), appointed to the Office of Military Commissions, Guantanamo, see Michael Chapman (lawyer)
- Ronald C. White (born 1939), American historian

== See also ==
- Ron Whyte (1941–1989), U.S. playwright
- Ronald Whyte (1942-2023), United States district judge for the Northern District of California

== Fictional characters ==
- Ronnie White, in the 2007 US slasher film Halloween, played by William Forsythe
