= Ronald Thomson =

Ronald Thomson may refer to:

- Sir Ronald Thomson, Lord Lieutenant of Peeblesshire
- Ron Thomson (1929–2004), Scottish journalist
- Ronald Ferguson Thomson (1830–1888), British diplomat
- Ronnie Thomson (born 1936), Scottish rugby union player and track and field athlete

== See also ==
- Ronald Thompson (disambiguation)
