= Ronald Wood =

Ronald Wood may refer to:

- Ronald Wood (cricketer) (1929–1990), English cricketer
- Ronald Karslake Starr Wood (1919–2017), British plant pathologist
- Ronnie Wood (born 1947), English musician and member of the Rolling Stones
- Ronnie Wood (ice hockey) (born 1960), Scottish ice hockey player
- Ronald McKinnon Wood (1892–1967), Labour member of London County Council
- Ron Wood (Australian footballer) (Ronald James William Wood, 1923–1978), Australian rules footballer
- Ron Wood (footballer, born 1925) (William Ronald Wood, 1925–2012), English footballer

== See also ==
- Ronald Woods (disambiguation)
