= Ronny =

Ronny is a given name, sometimes a short form (hypocorism) of Ronald. It may refer to:

- Ronny (footballer, born 1986), Brazilian footballer Ronny Heberson Furtado de Araújo
- Ronny (footballer, born 1991), Brazilian footballer Ronieri da Silva Pinto
- Ronny Abraham (born 1951), French President of the International Court of Justice
- Ronny Ackermann (born 1977), German Nordic combined skier
- Ronny Aukrust (born 1975), Norwegian politician
- Ronny Bierman (1938–1984), Dutch film and television actress
- Ronny Büchel (born 1982), footballer from Liechtenstein
- Ronny Cedeño (born 1983), Venezuelan baseball player, formerly in Major League Baseball
- Ronny Chieng, Malaysian comedian and actor, a senior correspondent on The Daily Show
- Ronny Claes (born 1957), Belgian racing cyclist
- Daniel Ronald Ronny Cox (born 1938), American actor and singer-songwriter
- Ronny Garbuschewski (born 1986), German footballer
- Ronny Graham (1919–1999), American actor and theater director, composer, lyricist and writer
- Ronny Hafsås (born 1985), Norwegian biathlete and cross-country skier
- Ronny Hallin, American television producer and actress
- Ronny Harun (born 1984), Malaysian footballer
- Ronny Hoareau (born 1983), Seychellois footballer
- Ronny J (born 1992), American record producer
- Ronny Jiménez (born 1989), Bolivian footballer
- Jean Ronny Johnsen (born 1969), Norwegian footballer
- Ronny Jordan (1962–2014), British guitarist Robert Simpson
- Ronny Kobo (born 1981), American fashion designer
- Ronny König (born 1983), German footballer
- Ronny Kumpf (born 1976), German politician
- Ronny Kupke
- Ronny Markes (born 1988), Brazilian mixed martial artist
- Ronny Marcos (born 1993), German-born Mozambican footballer
- Ronny Maza (born 1997), Venezuelan footballer
- Ronny Munroe (born 1965), American heavy metal singer
- Ronny Nikol (born 1974), German footballer
- Ronny Olander (born 1949), Swedish politician
- Ronny Philp (born 1989), Romanian-German footballer
- Ronny Reich (born 1947), Israeli archaeologist
- Ronny Rios (born 1990), American professional boxer
- Sylvio Ronny Rodelin (born 1989), French footballer
- Ronny Rosenthal (born 1963), Israeli footballer
- Ronny Simon (born 2000), Dominican baseball player
- Ronny Souto (born 1978), Cape Verdean footballer Walder Alves Souto Amado
- Ronny Sydney (born 1938), American teacher, lawyer, and politician
- Ronny Thielemann (born 1973), German football manager and former player
- Ronny Turiaf (born 1983), French National Basketball Association player
- Ronny Van Holen (born 1959), Belgian racing cyclist
- Ronny Yu (born 1950), Hong Kong film director, producer and screenwriter

== See also ==
- Ronnie (given name)
- Roni (given name)
- Rony, given name
