= Veronika Mudra-Lewis =

Ukrainian women's rights advocate

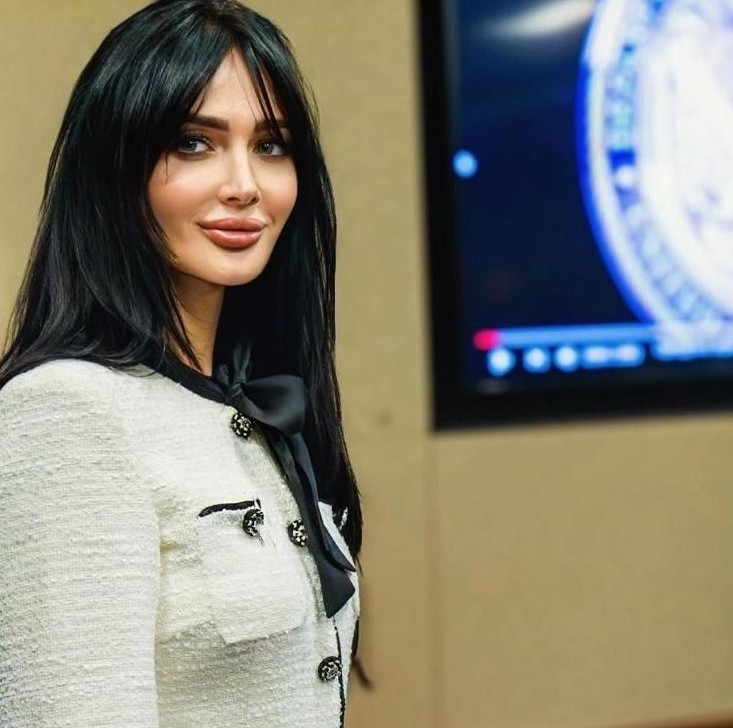
- Born: Veronika Mudra; Kyiv, Ukraine
- Occupations: Women's rights advocate Social entrepreneur
- Years active: 2012–present
- Organization(s): White Ribbon USA; White Ribbon Ukraine
- Spouse: Marquis Lewis
- Children: 1
- Awards: World Peace Ambassador (2020)
- Website: veronika.us

Veronika Mudra-Lewis is a Ukrainian-born American women's rights advocate and social entrepreneur. She is the founder and CEO of White Ribbon USA, a nonprofit organization focused on addressing Domestic violence. Mudra was previously involved in establishing the White Ribbon movement in Ukraine, where she advocated for legislation against domestic abuse before continuing her work in the United States.

== Early life and education ==
Mudra-Lewis was born in Kyiv, Ukraine. She completed her higher education in Ukraine, studying Social work and Financial management. In 2012, Mudra applied for asylum in the United States, and by 2014, she had resettled there with her son.

== Career ==
She began her music career in 2012 and her single "Ain't Russian Doll" received regular airplay throughout the United States including reaching No.1 on YouTube charts after receiving more than two million hits in less than one month. The video also received airplay on MTV.com.

In Ukraine, Mudra-Lewis became involved with the White Ribbon Campaign following the Revolution of Dignity in 2014. She initially joined as a volunteer and subsequently became the head of the initiative in the country. In 2014, she co-founded White Ribbon Ukraine, which launched a national public awareness campaign regarding domestic abuse. In 2017, she advocated in the Ukrainian Parliament (Verkhovna Rada) for the criminalization of domestic violence.

After relocating to the United States, Mudra-Lewis established a U.S. branch of the campaign. She co-founded White Ribbon USA in 2017 and serves as its CEO. The organization focuses on legislative reform to protect survivors, including provisions for refugees who have experienced domestic abuse, and has also engaged in local advocacy, such as in California, concerning the handling of domestic violence cases by authorities.

Mudra-Lewis has participated in public speaking engagements at various conferences and institutions. In 2018, she delivered a TEDx talk at TEDxModenaWomen titled "From a Victim to a Policy Changer." She also produced a short film, Reunited, which addresses issues within international child custody law related to domestic violence.

== Personal life ==
Mudra-Lewis's advocacy is informed by her personal experience with domestic violence. She was granted asylum in the United States in 2014 as a refugee from domestic violence. Following her relocation, she was involved in an international custody dispute which led her to return to Ukraine and publicly petition authorities for assistance. She is married to Retna and is based in the United States.

== Recognition ==
In 2020, Mudra-Lewis was appointed a World Peace Ambassador for the United States by World Peace Tracts. She has participated in forums such as the Women, Peace and Security platform of the United Nations and is a member of an intergovernmental task group on gender policy. In the United States, her organization partnered with the United States Department of Veterans Affairs for its White Ribbon VA campaign.
