= Ronnie Roemisch =

American football coach

Playing career
- c. 1978: Tarleton State

Coaching career (HC unless noted)
- 1993–1995: Tarleton State

Head coaching record
- Overall: 9–21–1

Ronnie Roemisch (German pronunciation: [ˈʁøːmɪʃ]) is an American football coach. He served as head coach at his alma mater, Tarleton State University, from 1993 to 1995. He compiled a 9–21–1 record overall. Roemisch was fired after a 1–10 season in 1995, and replaced with Todd Whitten.

Roemisch is a German Texan. His last name means “Roman” in German.

== Head coaching record ==
Year	Team	Overall	Conference	Standing	Bowl/playoffs
Tarleton State Texans () (1993–1995)
1993	Tarleton State	5–5			
1994	Tarleton State	3–6–1			
1995	Tarleton State	1–10			
Tarleton State:		9–21–1			
Total:		9–21–1			
