= Ronald Martin =

Ronald Martin or Ronnie Martin may refer to:

- Ronald Martin (American football) (born 1993), American football strong safety
- Ronald Martin (footballer) (born 1980), Ugandan footballer
- Ronnie Martin (ice hockey) (1907–1971), ice hockey player
- Ronnie Martin (Joy Electric)
- Whitey Martin (born 1939), basketball player

== See also ==
- Ron Martin (disambiguation)
