= Ronnie Stevens =

Ronnie Stevens may refer to:

- Ronnie Stevens (actor), (1925-2006) British actor
- Veronica Stevens, (born 1973) American female wrestler, sometimes known as "Ronnie" Stevens
