= Ronnie Goodman =

American artist

Ronnie Goodman (1961 – August 7, 2020) was a homeless artist who lived on the streets of San Francisco, California. Goodman became a local celebrity after the quality of his artwork gained recognition. He was also known as a distance runner who competed in local marathons. Goodman's character, artwork and biography which appeared in newspapers, Runner's World magazine and in documentaries, helped humanize the homeless crisis in San Francisco. Goodman died in his encampment in the Mission District of San Francisco on August 7, 2020, aged 60.

== Biography ==
Goodman was born in Los Angeles and moved to San Francisco when he was a baby. He grew up in a low income San Francisco housing project near Jefferson Square Park. Goodman had a difficult childhood and suffered from drug and alcohol addiction. Eventually, he was sentenced to prison for burglary. While serving between 6 and 8 years in San Quentin Prison, he rediscovered running and he developed his art.

Though he ran track as a child, he stopped around the age of 14. While in prison, Goodman joined San Quentin State Prison's 1,000 Mile Club inmate group that runs around a quarter-mile loop in the prison yard. He credited running with eventually helping him to break his alcohol and drug addictions. After being released from prison, Goodman continued to run long distance. After organizers of the San Francisco Marathon read a profile of Goodman in the San Francisco Chronicle Homeless S.F. marathoner doesn't run from his problems, marathon organizers reached out to Goodman to help. Goodman made a painting for the cause and they sold raffle tickets to win the painting. For every $10 donated to Hospitality House Community Arts Program, donors got a chance to win a piece of Goodman's art. Goodman's raffle raised almost $10,000 for Hospitality House Community Arts Program.

Also while in prison, Goodman developed his portrait drawing. He attended San Quentin Arts in Corrections Program taught by Art Hazelwood. When he was released from prison, Goodman took classes at City College of San Francisco and created work at the Hospitality House.

Goodman's son, Ronnie Jr, was a graffiti artist known as Papa Mire and worked on the murals in the Mission district. Ronnie Jr was stabbed to death in 2014.

== Appearances and profiles ==
Goodman was profiled in the book Marking Time: Art in the Age of Mass Incarceration written by Nicole R. Fleetwood, Professor of American Studies and Art History at Rutgers University. Goodman's artwork was also included in the Marking Time: Art in the Age of Mass Incarceration exhibition curated by Fleetwood and presented at the MoMA PS1.

His work was presented at the Georgia Museum of Art: Art Hazelwood and Ronnie Goodman: Speaking to the Issues. A documentary short by David Swope about Goodman titled Good Man - A Prison Arts Project Story was an Official Selection for the Mill Valley Film Festival.

The San Francisco Marathon created a video profile of Goodman titled Every Runner Has A Reason. The video became a viral success on YouTube with over 300,000 views.
