= Ten O'Clock Classics =

American group of classical musicians

Ten O'Clock Classics (TOC) is an American group of classical musicians established in 2000. It was founded by Juilliard graduate Ronen (Ronnie) Segev.

Ten O'Clock Classics have performed in venues throughout the world, including Cortot Hall in Paris and the Melbourne International Arts Festival. TOC's outreach concerts include performances at Studio 54, Gotham Properties, Crunch Fitness, The Knitting Factory, The Cutting Room, MAKOR, Le Cirque, and Union Square Ballroom.

The group's educational initiatives include providing weekly private music lessons and instruments free of charge to New York City schoolchildren, and performances and lectures at schools throughout the United States.

In April 2009, Billy Joel, one of the group's board members, auctioned off an autographed Steinway piano to raise funds for the education component of the program. In September 2009, Justin Timberlake made a donation.
