= Ronnie Edwards =

Ronnie Edwards may refer to:

- Ronnie Edwards (politician) (1952–2016), member of the Louisiana House of Representatives
- Ronnie Edwards (footballer) (born 2003), English footballer
- Ronnie Claire Edwards (1933–2016), American actress
- Ronnie Edwards, editor and animator, see The Game Theorists
