= Law (band) =

American rock band

- Origin: United States
- Genres: Rock, Funk
- Labels: GRC, MCA
- Past members: 1971; Steve Lawrence; Steve Acker; Mickey Williamson; 1973; Steve Lawrence; Steve Acker; Ronnie Lee Cunningham; John McIvor; 1973; Steve Acker; Ronnie Lee Cunningham; John McIvor; Tom Pool; 1975; Steve Lawrence; Steve Acker; Ronnie Lee Cunningham; John McIvor; Roy Kenner; 2009; Steve Acker; Steve Lawrence; Bob Pizzoferrato ?

Law was an American rock band, originating from Ohio, that was active throughout the 1970s. The band is particularly notable for its support by Roger Daltrey of The Who, as well as for its later inclusion of Roy Kenner, formerly of The James Gang, as lead vocalist.

== History ==
Law started out as a trio in Youngstown, Ohio and were formed in February 1971 by Steve Lawrence, Steve Acker and Mickey Williamson. The name came from their initials from each of their surnames. They were originally a three piece power trio and their music was similar to that of ZZ Top. They were known as a "boogie band "performing blues-based hard driving rock. Within a year of their creation they were opening for national acts such as Bob Seger, Edgar Winter's White Trash and Alice Cooper. In an outdoor show in Lake Milton with an audience of 5,000, as well as opening the program which featured various stars they also later performed as Chuck Berry's backup band. They would also open shows for The Who in the seventies and later Jethro Tull and Earth Wind & Fire and Boston, etc.

One of the founding members Mickey Williamson had left the band in 1973 because of family commitments. Ronnie Lee Cunningham who the other two members had become friendly with was now available due to the breakup of his band Brainchild and he accepted their offer to replace Mickey Williamson. A bass player from Macon, Georgia, John McIvor was added as well.

By the mid seventies the group was a 4-piece funk and rock band consisting of Ronnie Lee Cunningham on lead vocals and keyboards, John McIver on bass, Steve Lawrence on bass Tom Poole on drums and Steve Acker on guitar. Tom Poole had replaced their first drummer, Steve Lawrence. Steve Lawrence would rejoin the band at a later stage.

They had signed with GRC Records and recorded their first album in 1975 at GRC Records studio. The album also featured Memphis Horns, Joe Lala on perussion and Albhy Galuten on Synthesizer. The album wasn't a success but Wake Up written by Ronnie Lee Cunningham caught the attention of Roger Daltrey. Daltrey and his manager Bill Curbishly signed Law to their production company. They put Law on tour with the Who and also signed them to MCA Records.

Just before the spring of 1976, drummer Steve Lawrence would rejoin the band as Tom Poole's replacement. They also decided to add a second singer to their line up. On the suggestion of their producers, Ron and Howard Albert who had come up with a couple of singers who didn't get the job. The next consideration was Roy Kenner from the James Gang. Steve Acker flew to Toronto to interview him. Acker then invited him to join the band. Kenner accepted his offer and then moved to Ohio. This increased the group's line up to five.

The group broke up after the release of their second MCA album, Hold On to It. Possibly due to the multicultural nature of the group's music the band's albums they had trouble slotting into the radio format. With a lack of airplay, record sales were disappointing. Steve Acker had left the band in December 1977 and Law broke up.

By 2014, Acker was the only charter member of LAW still working in the music business. In 1980, after moving to Jackson, Mississippi to re-join his family there, he wrote and produced a statewide hit rock record for Mississippi State University titled "Bulldog Blitz." That year, he also wrote a eulogy for John Lennon which was published in a Jackson newspaper and was later selected by Yoko Ono for inclusion in the first Spirit Foundation book, "A Tribute to John Lennon." Embarking on a 30-year career in advertising, Acker created numerous award-winning commercials, jingles, and ad campaigns for ad agencies in Jackson, MS and Nashville, Tennessee, including an adult literacy program for Dollar General Stores that received the Presidential Award for Private Initiatives from President Ronald Reagan and the Benjamin Franklin Award from the Saturday Evening Post. To date, 4.7 million Dollar General customers have learned to read or earned GED certificates as a result of Dollar General's promotional efforts.

In 2007, Acker was signed to a development and production deal with the Studios @ SST in New York, NY, for whom he wrote numerous songs and documentary themes. Partnering with SST owner John Hanti in January 2012, he formed University Jams as an outgrowth of "Bulldog Blitz" to produce new college theme songs and fight songs. After Superstorm Sandy destroyed SST on October 28, 2012, Acker moved back to Mississippi to resume his advertising career. He continues to compose jingles and write songs and perform for occasional concerts.

== Discography ==
Singles

- Wake Up / Tootin' - GRC Records GRC 2072 - 1975
- Be My Woman / Layin Down The Law - MCA Records MCA 40656 - 1976
- Fairweather Friends / Shelter Of Your Arms - MCA Records MCA 40694 - 1977

Albums

- LAW - GRC Records GA 10017 - 1975
- Breakin' It - MCA Records MCA 2240 - 1977
- Hold On To It MCA Records MCA 2306 - 1977
