= Ronnie Elliott =

Ronnie Elliott may refer to:

- Ronnie Elliott (artist) (1910–1982), American sculptor and collagist
- Ronnie Elliott (rugby union) (born 1952), Irish rugby union player
