= Ronnie Cowan =

Ronnie Cowan may refer to:

- Ronnie Cowan (rugby) (born 1941), Scottish international rugby union, and rugby league footballer
- Ronnie Cowan (politician) (born 1959), Scottish National Party (SNP) Member of Parliament (MP) for Inverclyde since 2015
