= Ronnie Ancona (classicist) =

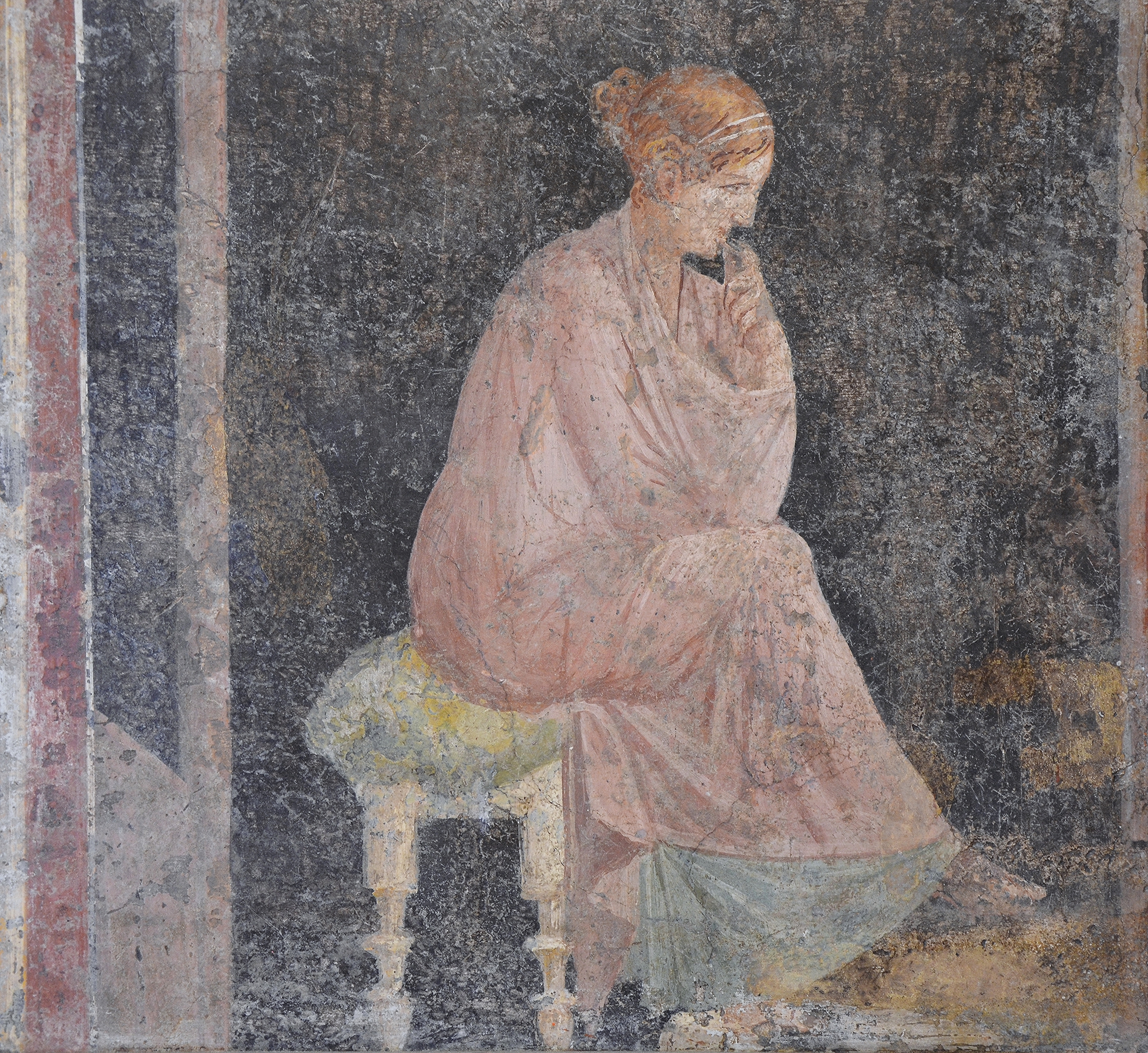
Fresco depicting a seated woman, from the Villa Arianna at Stabiae, 1st century CE, as featured on Ancona's New Directions in the Study of Women in the Greco-Roman World

Ronnie Ancona is Professor Emerita of Classics at Hunter College and the CUNY Graduate Center, USA. She is an expert on the ancient poetry, particularly the Roman poets Catallus and Horace, women in antiquity, classical reception and pedagogy.

== Education ==
Ancona received her PhD in Classics in 1983 from the Ohio State University. Her doctoral thesis was entitled Fugerit invida aetas: Some Studies of Time and the Erotic in Horace's Odes. She was awarded a BA in Latin from the University of Washington in 1972, and an MA in Classics in 1974.

== Career and research ==
Ancona is author of Time and the Erotic in Horace's Odes (1994), and co-editor of New Directions in the Study of Women in the Greco-Roman World (2021) and Gendered Dynamics in Latin Love Poetry (2005). Time and the Erotic in Horace's Odes was reviewed as 'thoughtfully challeng[ing] commonly accepted, arguably masculine ways of reading Horace's Odes'. Gendered Dynamics was described as a 'successful and thought-provoking collection'.

With Sarah B. Pomeroy, Ancona edits the book series Women in Antiquity for Oxford University Press. In 2025, Ancona published Martha Graham's Greek Myth-Based Dances and Her Collaboration with Isamu Noguchi with Bloomsbury. The book explores how the choreographer Martha Graham reimagined Greek myth to centre women, and how American sculptor and set designer Isamu Noguchi shaped those interpretations. These works, created primarily in the 1940s and 50s, are celebrated for their woman-centered reception of classical mythology, often retelling famous tragedies from the perspective of the female protagonist. Ancona understands that 'Part of the impact of these [Graham's] dances is that they resonate both with antiquity and with the ever-changing moment of today.'

In 2023, Ancona won the Merens Award from the American Classical League in recognition of her sustained and distinguished service to Classics. In 2022, Ancona was awarded the Pedagogy Award from the Society for Classical Studies.

== Bibliography ==
- Martha Graham's Greek Myth-Based Dances and Her Collaboration with Isamu Noguchi (London: Bloomsbury, 2025)
- (ed. with Georgia Tsouvala) New Directions in the Study of Women in the Greco-Roman World, (Oxford: Oxford University Press, 2021)
- Writing Passion Plus: A Catullus Reader Supplement (Bolchazy-Carducci Publishers, 2013)
- (written with David J. Murphy) Horace: A Legamus Transitional Reader (Bolchazy-Carducci Publishers, 2008)
- (ed.) A Concise Guide to Teaching Latin Literature (University of Oklahoma Press, 2007)
- (ed. with Ellen Greene) Gendered Dynamics in Latin Love Poetry (Johns Hopkins University Press, 2005)
- (written with David J. Murphy) A Horace Workbook (Bolchazy-Carducci Publishers, 2005)
- Horace: Selected Odes and Satire 1.9, Student Text (Bolchazy-Carducci Publishers, 1999)
- Horace: Selected Odes and Satire 1.9, Teacher's Guide (Bolchazy-Carducci Publishers, 1999)
- Time and the Erotic in Horace's Odes (Duke University Press, 1994)
