= Rony Santos =

Cape Verdean footballer (born 1995)

Personal information
- Full name: Ronicel Fortes Andrade Santos
- Date of birth: 10 January 1995 (age 31)
- Place of birth: Mindelo, Cape Verde
- Height: 1.85 m (6 ft 1 in)
- Position: Defender

Youth career
- 2012–2014: Benfica
- 2014–2015: Nacional

Senior career*
Years	Team	Apps	(Gls)
2015–2016	Trofense	20	(1)
2016–2017	Batuque FC	0	(0)
2017	Nyon	4	(0)
2017–2018	Cholet	0	(0)
2018	Jonava	12	(0)
2019	FC Azzurri 90 LS	8	(0)

International career^{‡}
2018–	Cape Verde	1	(0)
- * Club domestic league appearances and goals as of 12:40, 8 June 2023 (UTC) ‡ National team caps and goals as of 7 July 2018

Ronicel Fortes Andrade Santos (born 10 January 1995), better known as Rony Santos, is a Cape Verdean professional footballer who plays as a defender.

== Club career ==
Santos joined the Benfica academy in 2012 from Cape Verde, and joined Nacional in 2014.

In February 2019, Santos joined FC Azzurri 90 LS in Switzerland.

== International career ==
Santos made his debut for the Cape Verde national team in a 0–0 (4–3) penalty shootout win over Andorra on 3 June 2018.
