= Ronald Williams =

Ronald, Ron or Ronnie Williams may refer to:

== Arts and entertainment ==
- Ronald "Slim" Williams (born 1964), American record company executive; cofounder of Cash Money Records
- Ronnie Williams (comedian) (1939–1997), Welsh actor and comedian
- Ronnie Williams (singer) American soul singer

== Politics ==
- Ronald Jay Williams (1928–2000), Trinidadian businessman and politician
- Ronald Williams (Labour politician) (1907–1958), British Labour politician, member of parliament for Wigan
- Ronald Williams (Liberal politician) (1890–1971), English Liberal politician, member of parliament for Sevenoaks

== Sports ==
- Ron Williams (basketball) (1944–2004), American basketball player
- Ron Williams (footballer) (1917–1987), Australian rules footballer
- Ron Williams (rugby union) (born 1963), New Zealand rugby union player
- Ronald Williams (Canadian football) (born 1972), Canadian Football League running back
- Ronnie Williams (American football) (born 1966), American footballer
- Ronnie Williams (basketball) (1962–2021), American basketball player
- Ronnie Williams (footballer) (1907–1987), Swansea Town, Newcastle United and Wales international footballer
- Ronnie Williams (baseball) (born 1996), American baseball pitcher
- Ronnie Williams (racing driver), American stock car racing driver

== Others ==
- Ron Williams (born 1949), American business executive; chief executive of Aetna corporation
- Ron Williams (bishop), assistant bishop of Brisbane, 1993–2007
- Ronald Williams (bishop) (1906–1979), bishop of Leicester, 1953–1979
- Ronald A. Williams II (1969–1995), slain police officer from New Orleans
- Ronald J. Williams (c. 1945–2024), professor of computer science at Northeastern University
- Ronald Jay Williams (1881–1974), American frontiersman
- Ronald Turney Williams (born 1943), American serial killer and former fugitive
