= Ronald Rowe =

Ronald, Ron, or Ronnie Rowe could refer to:

- Ronald Rowe (footballer) (Ronald George Rowe, 1902–1977), English amateur footballer
- Ronnie Rowe (ice hockey) (Ronald Nickolas Rowe, 1923–2005), Canadian ice hockey player
- R. Kerry Rowe (Ronald Kerry Rowe, born 1951), Canadian civil engineer
- Ronald L. Rowe Jr. (born 1971), deputy director of the United States Secret Service
- Ronnie Rowe (actor) (fl. 2010s–2020s), Canadian film and television actor

== See also ==
- Ronald Roe (fl. 2010s), Aboriginal Australian writer
