= Ronnie Clayton =

Ronnie Clayton may refer to:

- Ronnie Clayton (footballer, born 1934) (1934–2010), Blackburn Rovers and England footballer
- Ronnie Clayton (footballer, born 1937), Brighton & Hove Albion footballer
- Ronnie Clayton (boxer) (1923–1999), British boxer

== Fictional characters ==
- Ronnie Clayton, in the UK TV soap opera Coronation Street, played by Emma Stansfield
