= Roni (given name) =

Roni is a given name. Notable people with the name include:

- Roni Bar-On (born 1948), Israeli politician and lawyer
- Roni Benise (fl. 1999-present), American guitarist
- Roni Beroperay (born 1992), Indonesian footballer
- Aharon Roni Brizon (born 1944), Israeli former politician
- Roni Dalumi (born 1991), Israeli singer
- Roni Duani (born 1986), Israeli singer
- Roni Lynn Deutch (born 1963), American former tax attorney
- Roni Horn (born 1955), American visual artist and writer
- Roni Hudd (born 2005), Finnish footballer
- Roni Jones-Perry (born 1997), American volleyball player
- Roni Milo (born Ron Milikovsky in 1949), Israeli politician, lawyer and journalist
- Roni Peiponen (born 1997), Finnish footballer
- Roni Pietsalo (born 2002), Finnish footballer
- Roni Porokara (born 1983), Finnish footballer
- Roni Rosenfeld (born 1959), Israeli-American computer scientist
- Roni Shuruk (born 1946), Israeli former footballer
- Roni Stoneman (1938-2024), American banjo player, former cast member of the Hee Haw TV show
- Roni Visnoveski Turola, aka Roni (footballer, born 1987) (born 1987), Brazilian football goalkeeper
