= Miramar Police Department =

Law enforcement agency in Miramar, Florida

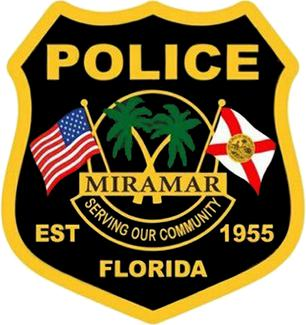

Agency overview
- Formed: 1955

Jurisdictional structure
- Legal jurisdiction: Municipal

Operational structure
- Headquarters: Miramar, Florida
- Sworn members: 199
- Unsworn members: 65
- Agency executive: Leonard Burgess, Interim Chief of Police

Website
- Official website

The Miramar Police Department is a municipal police agency responsible for law enforcement within the city of Miramar, Florida. The department is accredited by the Commission on Accreditation for Law Enforcement Agencies and the Commission for Florida Law Enforcement Accreditation. The current interim police chief is Leonard Burgess.

The Miramar Police Department was for some time headquartered in a strip mall. In 2005, a hurricane damaged their old building and the city has had difficulty finding a suitable replacement. The police department is currently located at 11765 City Hall Promenade, Miramar, FL 33025

== See also ==
- List of U.S. state and local law enforcement agencies
