= Ronnie Lee Cunningham =

American singer-songwriter (1952–2020)

- Born: August 15, 1952; Youngstown, Ohio
- Died: May 4, 2020; Las Vegas, Nevada
- Genres: Rock music, funk
- Occupation(s): Musician, songwriter
- Instrument(s): Keyboard, vocals
- Years active: before 1969 – 2020
- Labels: GRC
- Formerly of: LAW, Brainchild, The Ronnie Lee Thing

Ronnie Lee Cunningham (August 15, 1952 – 4 May 2020) was an American musician, best known as a member of the 1970s rock band LAW.

Cunningham's first notable engagement was as the band leader of his own group called The Ronnie Lee Thing, although before that he had already recorded his first single at the age of 14.

In 1969 he co-founded Brainchild, where he played until the group disbanded 1972.

Cunningham was friends with a founding member of LAW, Steve Acker, and through this connection joined LAW in 1973. He replaced Mickey Williamson at the keyboards, and also sang lead on many of their recordings.

In addition, Cunningham played either bass guitar or keyboards with Bad Company, Earth Wind & Fire, Al Jarreau, Bob Seger, Santana and Stevie Wonder. He has also worked with Michael Winslow of Police Academy fame.

In 2002 Cunningham and members of Brainchild got together to play at a concert at the Yankee Lake Ballroom in Brookfield to raise money for an autism center.

Married Barbara Patti Bostwick on May 11, 1984 - October 23, 1999.

Ronnie Lee Cunningham died in May 2020, in Las Vegas.

== Also appears on ==
- Phoenix – Power – Charisma – CA-1-2208 – 1979 (Keyboards & backing vocals)
