= Ronnie Gould =

English footballer

Personal information
- Date of birth: 27 September 1982 (age 44)
- Place of birth: Bethnal Green, England
- Position: Midfielder

Senior career*
| Years | Team | Apps | (Gls) |
| 2000–2002 | Leyton Orient | 2 | (0) |
| 2001 | → Heybridge Swifts (loan) | 7 | (3) |
| 2002 | Hampton & Richmond Borough | 3 | (0) |
| 2002 | Purfleet | 8 | (0) |
| 2002–2003 | Heybridge Swifts | 8 | (1) |
| 2003–2004 | Maldon Town | ? | (?) |
- * Club domestic league appearances and goals

Ronnie Gould (born 27 September 1982) is an English former professional footballer who played in the Football League as a midfielder.

Gould started his football career at the Sunday League Football side Senrab F.C. in the same age group as other future players Jermain Defoe and Leon Knight. Other players like Ledley King and John Terry played in the age groups above.

He was a schoolboy at Tottenham Hotspur before signing for Chelsea as a schoolboy. During this time he also represented his country at schoolboy level. At 16 he signed YTS forms with Leyton Orient. In 2000, he signed professional forms with The O's and went on to make 2 league appearances before later struggling due to injuries.

He later moved into the Isthmian League and represented a few teams including Hampton and Richmond, Purfleet, Heybridge Swifts and Maldon Town.
