= Roni (footballer, born 1987) =

Brazilian footballer

Personal information
- Full name: Roni Visnoveski Turola
- Date of birth: 7 July 1987 (age 39)
- Place of birth: Botucatu, Brazil
- Height: 1.88 m (6 ft 2 in)
- Position: Goalkeeper

Team information
- Current team: Atibaia

Youth career
- 2005–2006: Santos

Senior career*
| Years | Team | Apps | (Gls) |
| 2007 | Santos | | |
| 2008 | → Uberaba (loan) | | |
- * Club domestic league appearances and goals

Roni Visnoveski Turola (born 7 July 1987), or simply Roni, is a Brazilian professional footballer who plays as a goalkeeper for Uberaba on loan from Santos.
