= Ronnie Byrne =

Australian rules footballer, born 1900

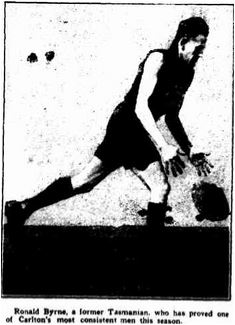
- Byrne in 1925

Personal information
- Full name: Ronald Frederick Byrne
- Born: 17 August 1900; Hobart, Tasmania
- Died: 14 December 1966 (aged 66); Tasmania
- Original team: Lefroy
- Height: 171 cm (5 ft 7 in)
- Weight: 65 kg (143 lb)

Playing career^{1}
Years	Club	Games (Goals)
1925–26	Carlton	14 (3)
- ^{1} Playing statistics correct to the end of 1926.

Ronald Frederick Byrne (17 August 1900 – 14 December 1966) was an Australian rules footballer who played with Carlton in the Victorian Football League (VFL).

In August 1918 Byrne enlisted to fight for his country in World War 1, having trained for four years with the Army Cadets, however the war ended before he saw active duty.

Byrne returned to Hobart where he was an apprentice electrician and commenced his football career with his local football club, Lefroy, playing as a clever centreman and half back flanker. In 1924 Lefroy won their seventh TFL Premiership, with Ronnie Byrne a key contributor. That effort brought an approach from the Carlton Football Club, and Byrne moved to Melbourne in late 1924.

After a successful 1925 season with Carlton, he quit the club early in 1926, finishing his VFL career with 14 games. He returned to Tasmania a few years later.
