= Ronnie Slevin =

Irish hurler

Personal information
- Born: 1941 (age 84–85) Aglish, County Tipperary

Sport
- Sport: Hurling
- Position: Left wing-back
Club
- Years: Club
- 1950s-1970s: Borrisokane
Club titles
- Tipperary titles: 0
Inter-county
- Years: County
- 1962: Tipperary
Inter-county titles
- Munster titles: 1
- All-Irelands: 1
- NHL: 0

Ronnie Slevin (born 1941 in Aglish, County Tipperary) is a retired Irish sportsperson. He played hurling with his local club Borrisokane and was a member of the Tipperary senior inter-county team for one season in 1962. Slevin won a set of All-Ireland and Munster titles with Tipp in 1962.
