= Ron Baker (American football) =

American football player (born 1954)

No. 60, 63
- Position: Guard

Personal information
- Born: November 19, 1954 (age 71); Gary, Indiana, U.S.
- Listed height: 6 ft 4 in (1.93 m)
- Listed weight: 260 lb (118 kg)

Career information
- High school: Emerson (IN)
- College: Oklahoma State
- NFL draft: 1977: 10th round, 277th overall pick

Career history
- Baltimore Colts (1977–1979); Philadelphia Eagles (1980–1988)

Career NFL statistics
- Games played: 155
- Games started: 109
- Fumble recoveries: 4
- Stats at Pro Football Reference

Ronald Baker (born November 19, 1954) is an American former professional football player who was an offensive lineman in the National Football League (NFL) for the Baltimore Colts and Philadelphia Eagles. He played college football for the Oklahoma State Cowboys and was selected in the tenth round of the 1977 NFL draft.
