= Ronnie Todd =

Scottish footballer

Ronald Todd
Personal information
- Full name: Ronald Todd
- Date of birth: 4 October 1935 (age 91)
- Place of birth: Bellshill, Scotland
- Position: Wing half

Senior career*
Years	Team	Apps	(Gls)
19??–1956	Lesmahagow		
1956–1960	Accrington Stanley	5	(0)
1960–1961	Chelmsford City		
- * Club domestic league appearances and goals

Ronald Todd (born 4 October 1935) is a Scottish former professional footballer who played as a wing half in the English Football League for Accrington Stanley.
