= Renard =

Renard may refer to:

== Engineering and design ==
- Renard series, a system of preferred numbers divided into intervals from 1 to 10, and with 5, 10, 20 or 40 steps

== Fictional characters and art ==
- Reynard, anthropomorphic fox of European folklore
- Renard, or Reynardine, a fox-like character in webcomic Gunnerkrigg Court
- Renard (Stravinsky), 1916 opera-ballet by Igor Stravinsky premiered by the Ballets Russes with choreography by Bronislava Nijinska
- Renard, the Anarchist, villain from the James Bond movie The World Is Not Enough
- Renard IV, the King of Foxville in L. Frank Baum's The Road to Oz, called "King Dox" by Button-Bright
- Maria Renard, fictional character in the Castlevania video game series
- Halcyon Renard, character from the cartoon Gargoyles
- Sean Renard, character from the television series Grimm
- "Le Renard Subtil", Magua in The Last of the Mohicans
- Renard Queenston, an alias under Halley Labs that produces raggacore

== People ==
- Renard (surname), including a list of people with the name
- Alan II, Duke of Brittany (died 952), known as Le Renard
- Renard Cox (born 1978), Canadian football player

== Organisations ==
- Constructions Aéronautiques G. Renard, Belgian aircraft manufacturer of the 1930s and 1940s
- Renard Motorcycles, an Estonian motorcycle brand

== Places ==
- Cape Renard, a cape on the west coast of Antarctic Peninsula
- False Cape Renard, a cape southwest of Cape Renard, Antarctica
- Renard, Guadeloupe, a settlement on the island of Grande-Terre, Guadeloupe
- Renard Glacier, a glacier on the west coast of Graham Land, Antarctica
- Renard Islands, an island of Papua New Guinea
- Renard Isle, a man-made island in the lower Green Bay, Wisconsin, USA

== Ships ==
- HMS Renard, or HMS Reynard, ten ships of the Royal Navy
- HMCS Renard (S13), later reclassified Z13, armed yacht which served in the Royal Canadian Navy as a patrol vessel from 1940 to 1944
- French cutter Renard (1812), privateer cutter commissioned by Robert Surcouf in 1812
- French ship Renard, eleven ships of the French Navy

== Other uses ==
- Renard diamond mine, a diamond mine in Canada which opened in July 2014
- Renard Field, an airport on Mbanika in the Solomon Island
- Renard GAA, a Gaelic Athletic Association club from County Kerry, Ireland

== See also ==
- Reenard, townland in County Kerry, Ireland
- Monsignor Renard, a four-part ITV television drama set in occupied France during World War II
- Renaud (disambiguation)
- Reynard (disambiguation)
- Rennard
