= Regnault =

Regnault may refer to:

- Regnault (crater), a crater on the Moon
- French submarine Regnault (Q113), a Lagrange-class submarine built for the French Navy
- Lycée Regnault, a school in Tangier, Morocco

== People with the surname ==
- Alice Regnault (1849–1931), French actress
- Antoine Régnault (16th c.), French merchant and bourgeois
- Étienne Regnault (d. 1688), first governor of Réunion
- Félix Regnault (1863–1938), French physician, anthropologist and prehistorian
- François Regnault (printer) (died 1540), printer and bookseller
- François Regnault (born 1938), French philosopher, playwright and dramaturg
- Henri Regnault, (1843–1871), French painter
- Henri Victor Regnault (1810–1878), French scientist, father of Henri
- Jean-Baptiste Regnault (1754–1829), French painter
- Jules Regnault (1834–1894), French economist
- Kyle Regnault (born 1988), American baseball player
- Patrick Regnault (born 1974), French football player
- Valère Regnault (1545–1623), French Jesuit theologian

== See also ==
- Renaud (disambiguation)
- Renault (disambiguation)
- Reynard (disambiguation)
