= French ship Renard =

Eleven ships of the French Navy have borne the name Renard, after the Fox or the character Reynard. (Note: The character's name is written "Renard" in French; by the end of the Middle Age, it had replaced the word "goupil" for "fox".) The name was also popular for privateers.

== Naval ships ==
- French fireship Renard, a fire ship.
- French corvette Renard (1746), a 16-gun corvette, deleted from Navy lists in 1748.
- French xebec Renard (1762), a 20-gun ship, sold in 1780.
- French corvette Renard (1780), a corvette captured by the British in 1780.
- French lugger Renard (1780), formerly the captured British privateer Fox.
- French lugger Renard (1793), a 12-gun lugger. She appears to have been converted to a schooner; if so, she was the vessel that HMS Cameleon captured in 1803 and that became HMS Renard, later renamed to HMS Crafty. The Spanish captured Crafty in 1807.
- French brig Renard (1810), a 16-gun Abeille-class brig.
- French cutter Renard (1829), an 8-gun Écureuil-class cutter.
- French aviso Renard (1866), a second-class aviso.
- French patrol boat Renard (1916), an auxiliary patrol boat.
- French tugboat Renard (1918), a Loup-class tugboat.
Ships of the French Navy named Renard
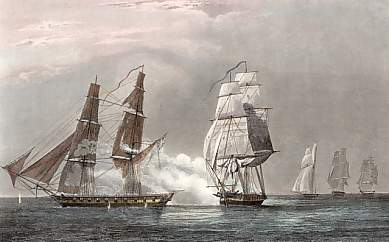
Fight between Renard (1810) and HMS Swallow.

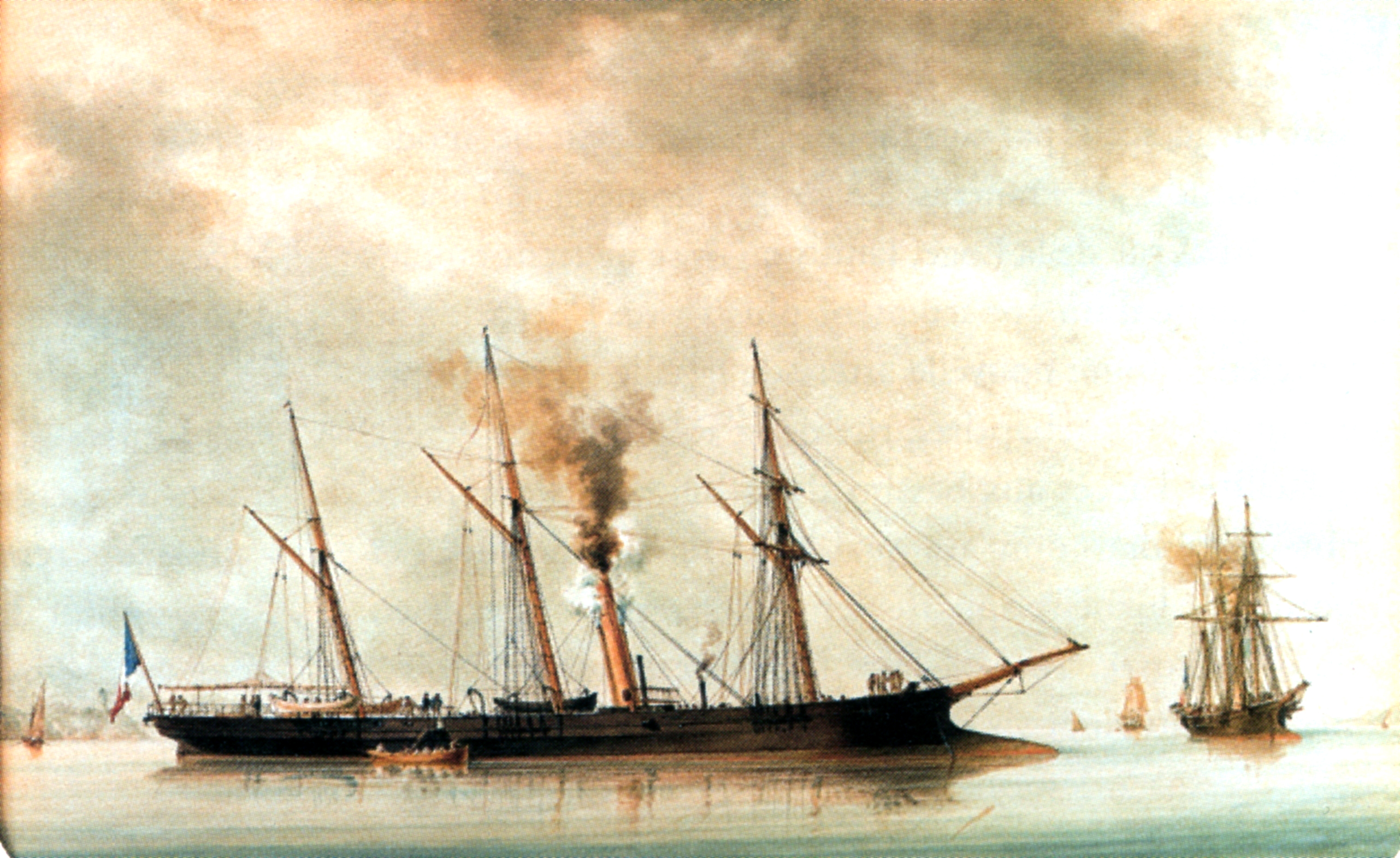
The second-class aviso Renard (1866)

== See also ==
- Renard Bleu (1917), formerly the American tug Helen Hope, which the French Navy purchased in 1918.

== Privateers ==
- Renard, of Dieppe, was a two-masted vessel armed with one gun and five swivel guns, and carrying a crew of 29 men. The sloop HMS Jamaica captured her on 2 July 1747.
- Renard was a cutter of 10 guns and 71 men, belonging to Guadeloupe, that Tamar captured on 7 August 1795 off Martinique.
- Renard was a privateer that Cerberus captured on 12 November 1797 on the Irish station. The Royal Navy took her into service under her existing name and sold her in 1807.
- Renard was a French privateer lugger that Nemesis captured on 12 January 1800.
- Renard was a privateer sloop of three guns and 15 men that Surinam captured on 26 March 1800.
- Renard was a French privateer that the hired armed lugger Nile captured on 1 November 1800 off Folkestone.
- Renard was a privateer lugger, pierced for 10 guns, that Fortunee, Trent, and the cutter Dolphin captured near Saint Aubin's Bay on 20 April 1801.
- Renard was a French privateer captured on 16 November 1802 by a British squadron in the Mediterranean.
- Renarde (or Renard) was a French privateer lugger that Skylark captured on 7 November 1807. Skylark shared the capture with Trompeuse and the hired armed cutter Countess of Elgin, with which she was in company.
- Renard was a felucca-rigged privateer of one 6-pounder gun and 47 men that the boats of Meleager captured on 8 February 1808 off Santiago de Cuba.
- Renard was a privateer cutter of six guns and 24 men that Quebec and Kite captured on 2 December 1810.
- Renard, launched in 1812, was a privateer cutter owned by Robert Surcouf.
