= Claas Lexion =

Series of combine harvesters

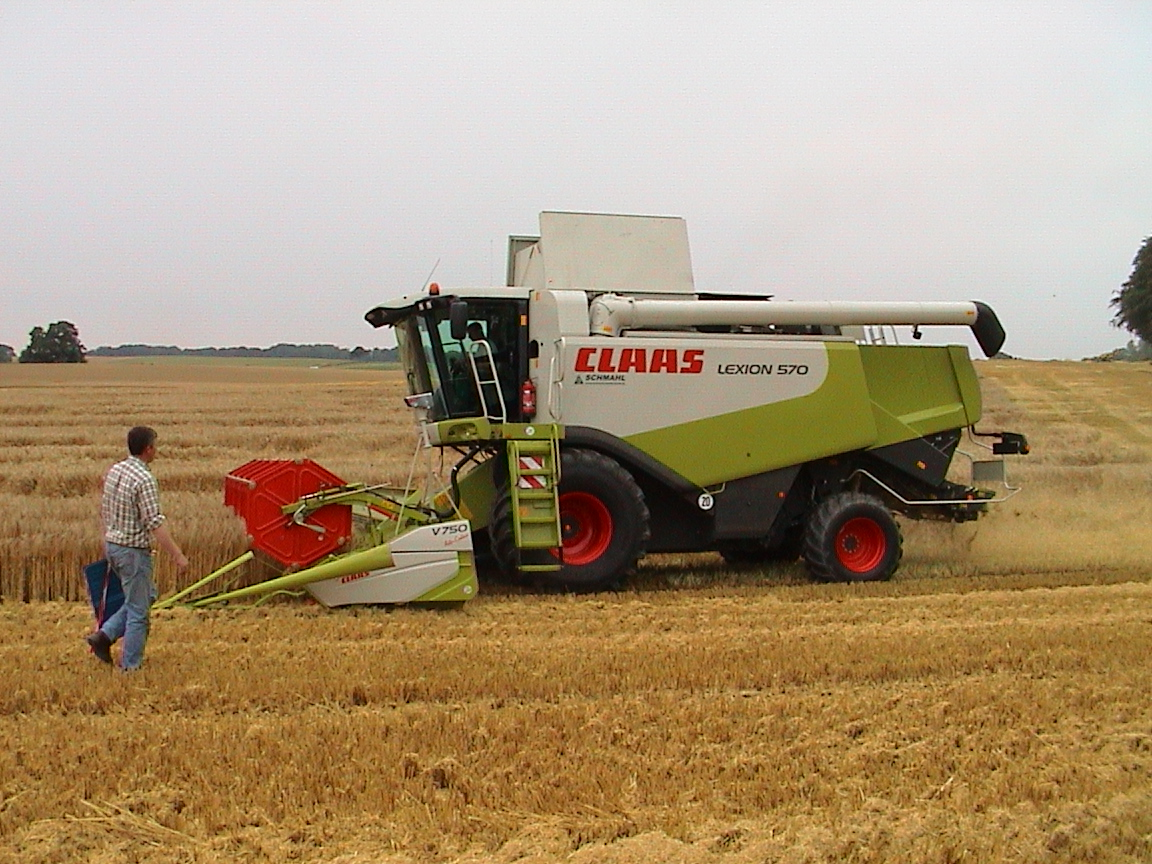
Claas Lexion 570

Claas Lexion is a series of combine harvesters, manufactured by Claas in Harsewinkel. An American version called Lexion is produced by Claas Omaha Inc. in the United States.

== History ==
The Lexion was presented in 1995. The first model was the Lexion 480. It has a harvesting capacity of 40 tonnes (39 long tons; 44 short tons) of grain per hour and was at that time the most powerful combine harvester in the world. The Lexion 480 had the same accelerator drum in front of the threshing drum as the Claas Mega, but it came with a bigger threshing drum (600 mm [24 in] diameter and 1,700 mm [67 in] width instead of 450 mm [18 in] diameter and 1,580 mm [62 in] width). Instead of the straw walkers, the Lexion 480 had two separation rotors installed. As a result, the unit ran smoothly and the throughput was much higher than in a conventional straw-walker machine.

From 1999, Claas worked with the US agricultural and construction machinery manufacturer Caterpillar and sold the Lexion combines in North America under the CAT brand. In 2002, Claas took over 50% of the joint venture with Caterpillar and the combine harvester production in the United States. The harvesters produced there were then still marketed as CAT Lexion.

At the 2005 Agritechnica exhibition, Claas presented the Lexion 600, with a cutting width of up to 12 m (39.37 feet), a grain tank capacity of 12,000 liters (330 Bushels) and a performance up to 60,000 kilograms per hour (130,000 lb/h). This was again the most powerful combine harvester in the world. In 2010, Claas presented the Lexion 700. In 2013, Claas introduced new emission standards (Tier 4). The Lexion 8900 released in 2019 has a 581-kilowatt (779 hp) MAN D42 engine that matches the Fendt Ideal 10,000-kilogram (22,000 lb) class 10 combine released in 2020.

== Lexion series ==
- 400 series (two separation rotors)
- 500 series (six straw walkers)
- 600 series (six straw walkers)
- 700 series (two separation rotors)
- 5000 series (five straw walkers)
- 6000 series (six straw walkers)
- 7000 series (two separation rotors)
- 8000 series (two separation rotors)

| Series 400 (1996–2003) | Grinder | Grip in meters | Engine power in kW (hp) (ECE R 120) | Maximum power in kW (hp) (ECE R 120) | Grain hopper capacity in liters |
|---|---|---|---|---|---|
| LEXION 405 | APS + 5-button straw walker | 4,50 — 5,40 | 120 (170) | | 5500 |
| LEXION 410 | APS + 5-button straw walker | 4,50 — 5,40 | 147 (200) | | 6300 |
| LEXION 415 | APS + 5-button straw walker | 4,50 — 5,40 | | | 6500 |
| LEXION 420 | APS + 5-button straw walker | 4,50 — 6,00 | 161 (220) | | 7300 |
| LEXION 430 / 430 Montana | APS + 5-button straw walker | 5,40 — 6,00 | 176 (240) | | 7800 |
| LEXION 440 | APS + 6-key straw walker | 5,40 — 6,60 | 184 (250) | | 8100 |
| LEXION 450 | APS + 6-key straw walker | 5,40 — 6,60 | 205 (275) | | 8600 |
| LEXION 460 / 460 Terra Trac * | APS + 6-key straw walker | 6,00 — 7,50 | 220 (300) | | 9600 |
| LEXION 470 / 470 Montana | APS + 2 HYBRID Rotors | 6,00 — 7,50 | | | 9600 |
| LEXION 480 / 480 Terra Trac * | APS + 2 HYBRID Rotors | 6,60 — 9,00 | 294 (400) | 305 (415) | 10500 |
| Series 500 (2003–2010) | Grinder | Grip in meters | Engine power in kW (hp) (ECE R 120) | Maximum power in kW (hp) (ECE R 120) | Grain hopper capacity in liters |
| LEXION 510 | APS + 5-button straw walker | 5,40 — 6,00 | 173 (235) | | 7300 |
| LEXION 520 | APS + 5-button straw walker | 5,40 — 6,60 | 203 (276) | | 7800 |
| LEXION 530 / 530 Montana | APS + 5-button straw walker | 5,40 — 6,60 | 260 (353) | | 8600 |
| LEXION 540C / 540 | APS + 6-key straw walker | 5,40 — 7,50 | 203 (276) / 230 (313) | | 8100 / 8600 |
| LEXION 550 / 550 Montana | APS + 6-key straw walker | 6,00 — 7,50 | 258 (351) | | 9600 |
| LEXION 560 / 560 Montana / 560 Terra Trac * | APS + 6-key straw walker | 6,60 — 9,00 | 283 (385) | | 10500 |
| LEXION 570C / 570 / 570 Montana / 570 Terra Trac * | APS + 2 HYBRID Rotors | 6,60 — 9,00 | 282 (385) / 313 (425) | 305 (415) / 334 (455) | 9600 / 10500 |
| LEXION 580 / 580 Terra Trac * | APS + 2 HYBRID Rotors | 7,50 bis 10,50 | 340 (462) | 380 (517) | 10500 |
| LEXION 600 / 600 Terra Trac * | APS + 2 HYBRID Rotors | 7,50 — 12,00 | 390 (530) | 431 (586) | 12000 |
| Series 600/700 (2010–2012) | Grinder | Grip in meters | Engine power in kW (hp) (ECE R 120) | Maximum power in kW (hp) (ECE R 120) | Grain hopper capacity in liters |
| LEXION 620 | APS + 5-button straw walker | 5,40 — 6,60 | 205 (279) | 205 (279) | 7800 / 8600 |
| LEXION 630 / 630 Montana | APS + 5-button straw walker | 5,40 — 6,60 | 230 (313) | 249 (339) | 8600 |
| LEXION 640 | APS + 6-key straw walker | 6,00 — 7,50 | 205 (279) | 205 (279) | 8100 / 8600 |
| LEXION 650 | APS + 6-key straw walker | 6,00 — 7,50 | 230 (313) | 249 (339) | 9600 |
| LEXION 660 | APS + 6-key straw walker | 6,60 — 7,50 | 261 (355) | 278 (378) | 10500 |
| LEXION 670 / 670 Montana / 670 Terra Trac * | APS + 6-key straw walker | 6,60 — 9,00 | 287 (390) | 317 (431) | 10500 |
| LEXION 740 | APS + 2 HYBRID Rotors | 6,60 — 7,50 | 287 (390) | 317 (431) | 9600 |
| LEXION 750 / 750 Montana / 750 Terra Trac * | APS + 2 HYBRID Rotors | 7,50 — 9,00 | 317 (431) | 343 (466) | 9600 (Montana) / 10500 |
| LEXION 760 / 760 Terra Trac * | APS + 2 HYBRID Rotors | 9,00 — 10,50 | 350 (476) | 390 (530) | 10500 |
| LEXION 770 / 770 Terra Trac * | APS + 2 HYBRID Rotors | 9,00 — 12,00 | 390 (530) | 431 (586) | 12000 |
| Series 600/700 Abgasnorm Tier 4 (2013–2019) | Grinder | Grip in meters | Engine power in kW (hp) (ECE R 120) | Maximum power in kW (hp) (ECE R 120) | Grain hopper capacity in liters |
| LEXION 620 | APS + 5-button straw walker | 5,40 — 6,60 | 224 (305) | 224 (305) | 8000 / 9000 optional |
| LEXION 630 / 630 Montana | APS + 5-button straw walker | 5,40 — 6,60 | 239 (325) | 264 (359) | 9000 |
| LEXION 650 | APS + 6-key straw walker | 6,00 — 7,50 | 239 (325) | 264 (359) | 9000 / 10000 optional |
| LEXION 660 | APS + 6-key straw walker | 6,60 — 7,50 | 269 (366) | 294 (400) | 10000 / 11000 optional |
| LEXION 670 / 670 Montana / 670 Terra Trac * | APS + 6-key straw walker | 6,60 — 9,00 | 305 (415) | 330 (449) | 10000(Montana) / 11000 |
| LEXION 750 / 750 Terra Trac * | APS + 2 HYBRID Rotors | 7,50 — 9,00 | 305 (415) | 330 (449) | 10000 |
| LEXION 760 / 760 Montana / 760 Terra Trac * | APS + 2 HYBRID Rotors | 9,00 — 10,50 | 330 (449) | 360 (490) | 10000(Montana) / 11000 |
| LEXION 770 / 770 Terra Trac * | APS + 2 HYBRID Rotors | 9,00 — 12,00 | 370 (503) | 405 (551) | 11500 / 12500 optional |
| LEXION 780/780 Terra Trac * | APS + 2 HYBRID Rotors | 10,50 — 12,00 | 405 (551) | 440 (598) | 12500 |
