= Renault (disambiguation) =

Renault is a French multinational automobile manufacturer established in 1899.

Renault may also refer to:

== Vehicles ==
- Renault in Formula One, Formula One activities of the French automobile company named Renault
- Renault Sport Technologies, sports division of the French automobile company named Renault
- Formula Renault, a class of car racing supported by Renault Sport
- Renault Trucks, French truck and bus manufacturing subsidiary of AB Volvo
- Renault Agriculture, defunct French agricultural equipment manufacturer
- Military vehicles by Renault, such as tanks like Renault R40
- Aircraft engines by Renault, such as the Renault 4P

== People ==
- Renault (name)

== Fiction ==
- Captain Louis Renault, in the film Casablanca
- Jerry Renault, the protagonist of The Chocolate War
- Dr. Renault's Secret, 1942 motion picture from 20th Century Fox
- Bernard, Jacques and Jean Renault, related characters in the Twin Peaks TV series, see List of Twin Peaks characters#Renault family

== Places ==
- Château-Renault is a commune in the Indre-et-Loire department in Centre region, France
- Auberville-la-Renault is a commune in the Seine-Maritime department in the Normandy region in northern France
- Renault, Illinois, USA, an unincorporated community

== Other ==
- Renault (cognac), a brand and a manufacturer of Cognac (French Brandy Liquor)
- Renault (cycling team), a French road-racing team 1978–1985
- Renault Winery, a winery in New Jersey
- Ogilvy Renault, a large Canadian law firm (1879–2010)

== See also ==
- Renaud (disambiguation)
- Renald, given name
- Reynard (disambiguation)
- Raynaud's phenomenon
- Raynaud's disease
