= Renaud (disambiguation) =

Renaud (Renaud Séchan; born 1952) is a French singer, songwriter and actor.

Renaud may also refer to:

- Renaud (Desmarets), a 1722 opera by the French composer Henri Desmarets
- Renaud (opera), a 1783 opera by Antonio Sacchini
- Renaud Island, an island in the Biscoe Islands of Antarctica
- Renaud, Quebec, part of Laval, Quebec
- Renaud River, a tributary of the Rivière du Gouffre in Quebec, Canada
- Renaud (name), a male French given name, related to the English name Reynold or Ronald

== See also ==
- Regnault (disambiguation)
- Renault (disambiguation)
- Reynard (disambiguation)
