= HMS Renard =

Ten ships of the Royal Navy have borne the name HMS Renard, or HMS Reynard, after the French for fox, and the anthropomorphic figure of Reynard:

- HMS Renard (1780) was an 18-gun sloop that HMS Brune captured from the French in July 1781. She became a hospital ship in Antigua in 1781–82, and was broken up in 1784. (Note: Colledge & Warlow have Brune capturing Renard in May 1780.)
- HMS Renard (1797) was an 18-gun sloop, previously a French privateer. The British captured her in 1797 and sold her in 1809.
- HMS Renard (1803) was a French naval 12-gun schooner that HMS Cameleon captured in 1803; The Admiralty later renamed her HMS Crafty. The Spanish captured Crafty in 1807.
- HMS Reynard (1808) was a 10-gun Cherokee-class brig-sloop launched in 1808 and sold for breaking up in 1818.
- HMS Reynard (1821) was a 10-gun Cherokee-class brig-sloop launched in 1821. She was renamed HMS Renard in 1828, reclassified as a mooring vessel in 1841, and was broken up in 1857.
- HMS Reynard (1848) was a unique wooden screw sloop launched in 1848 and wrecked in 1851.
- HMS Renard (1856) was a Vigilant-class gunvessel launched in 1856 and broken up in 1866.
- HMS Renard (1873) was a Beagle-class schooner launched in Sydney in 1873 and sold in 1883.
- HMS Renard (1892) was an Alarm-class torpedo gunboat launched in 1892 and sold in 1905.
- HMS Renard (1909) was a Beagle-class destroyer launched in 1909 and sold in 1920.
