= Rennard =

Rennard is both a surname and a given name. Notable people with the name include:

- Audrey Rennard (born 1933), British gymnast
- Chris Rennard, Baron Rennard (born 1960), English politician
- Deborah Rennard (born 1959), American actress
- Jon Rennard, English singer
- Rennard Strickland, American lawyer
