= Claas =

Agricultural machinery manufacturer

CLAAS KGaA mbH
- Type: GmbH & Co. KGaA
- Industry: Agricultural machinery
- Founded: 1913; 113 years ago
- Founder: August Claas
- Headquarters: Harsewinkel, Germany
- Area served: Worldwide
- Key people: Jan-Hendrik Mohr (CEO)
- Products: Tractors; Combines; Gearboxes and Axles; Balers; Forage harvesters Telescopic handlers Wheel loaders Farming Information Technology
- Revenue: ▲€4.917 bn (2025)
- Number of employees: 11,654 (2025)
- Website: www.claas.com

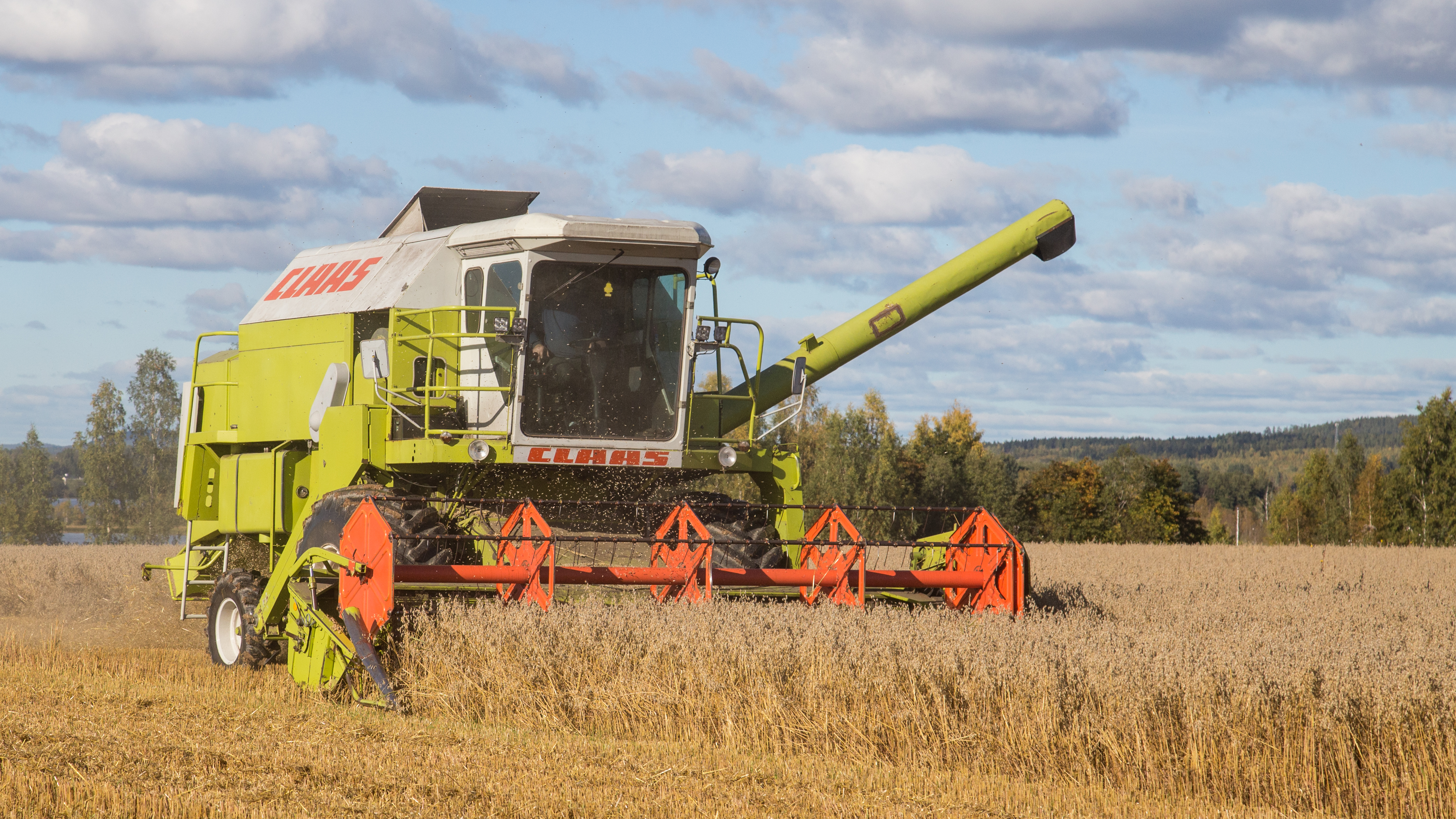
CLAAS DOMINATOR 96 combine harvester

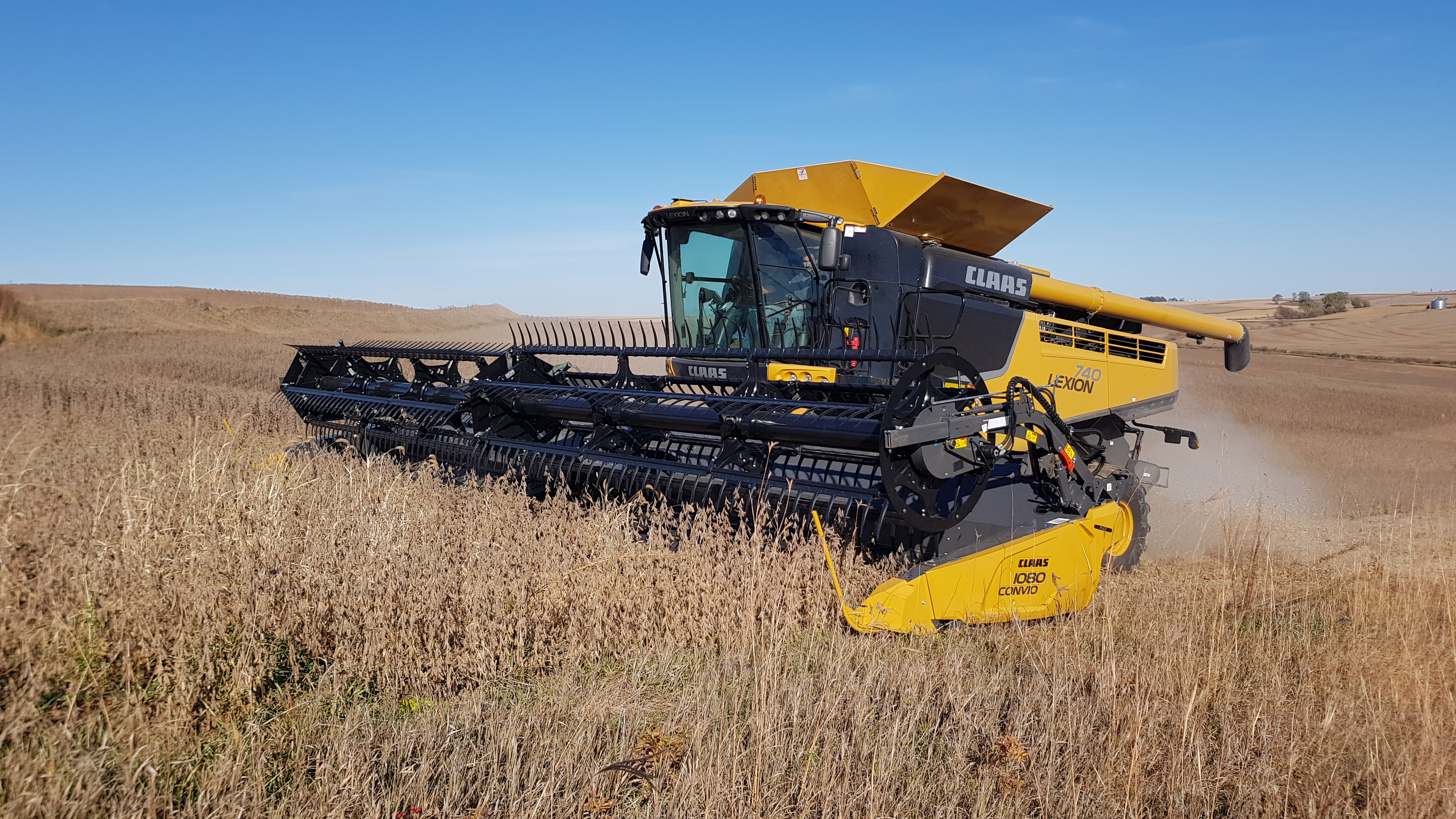
CLAAS LEXION 740 combine harvester

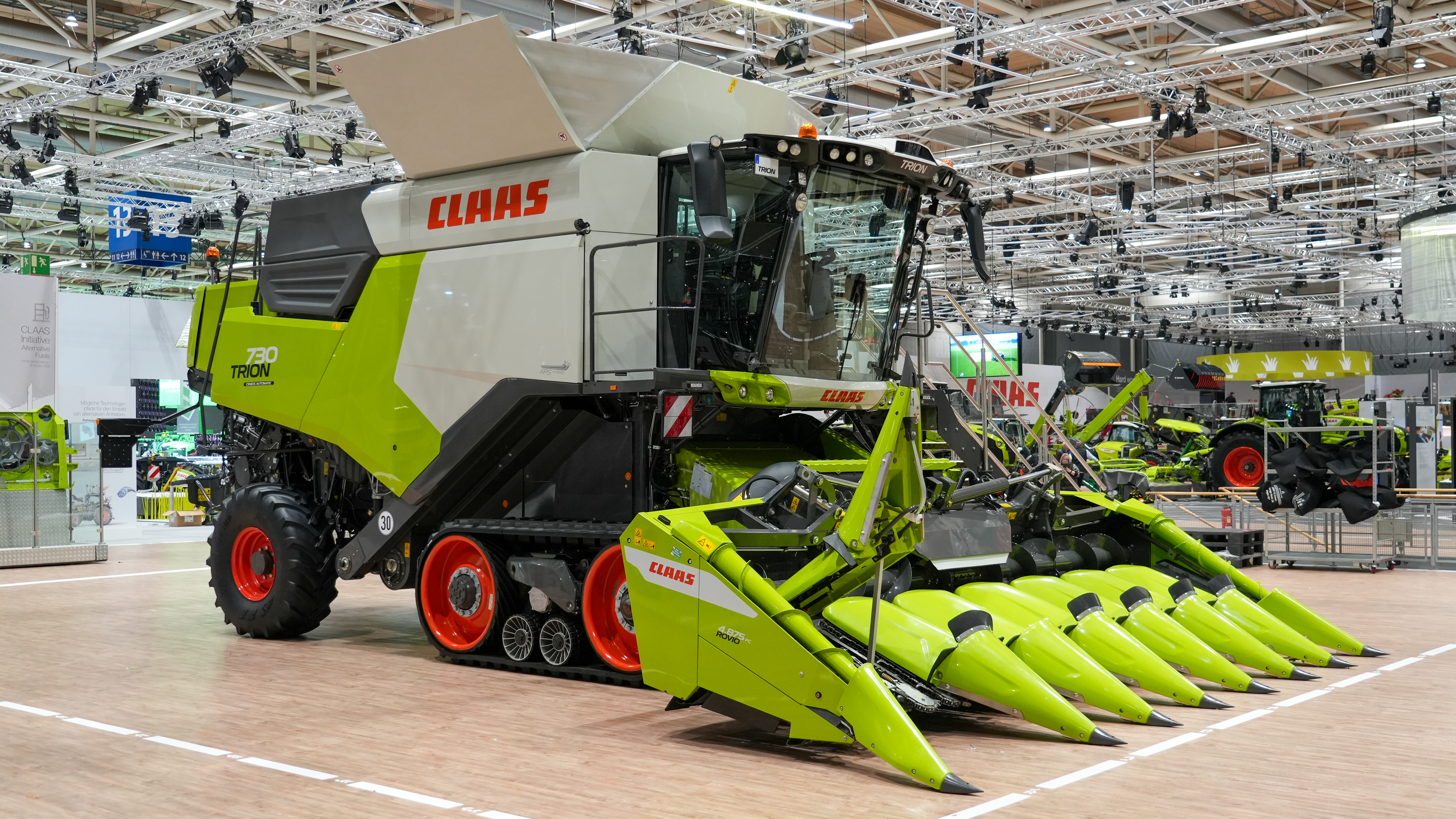
CLAAS TRION 730 combine harvester

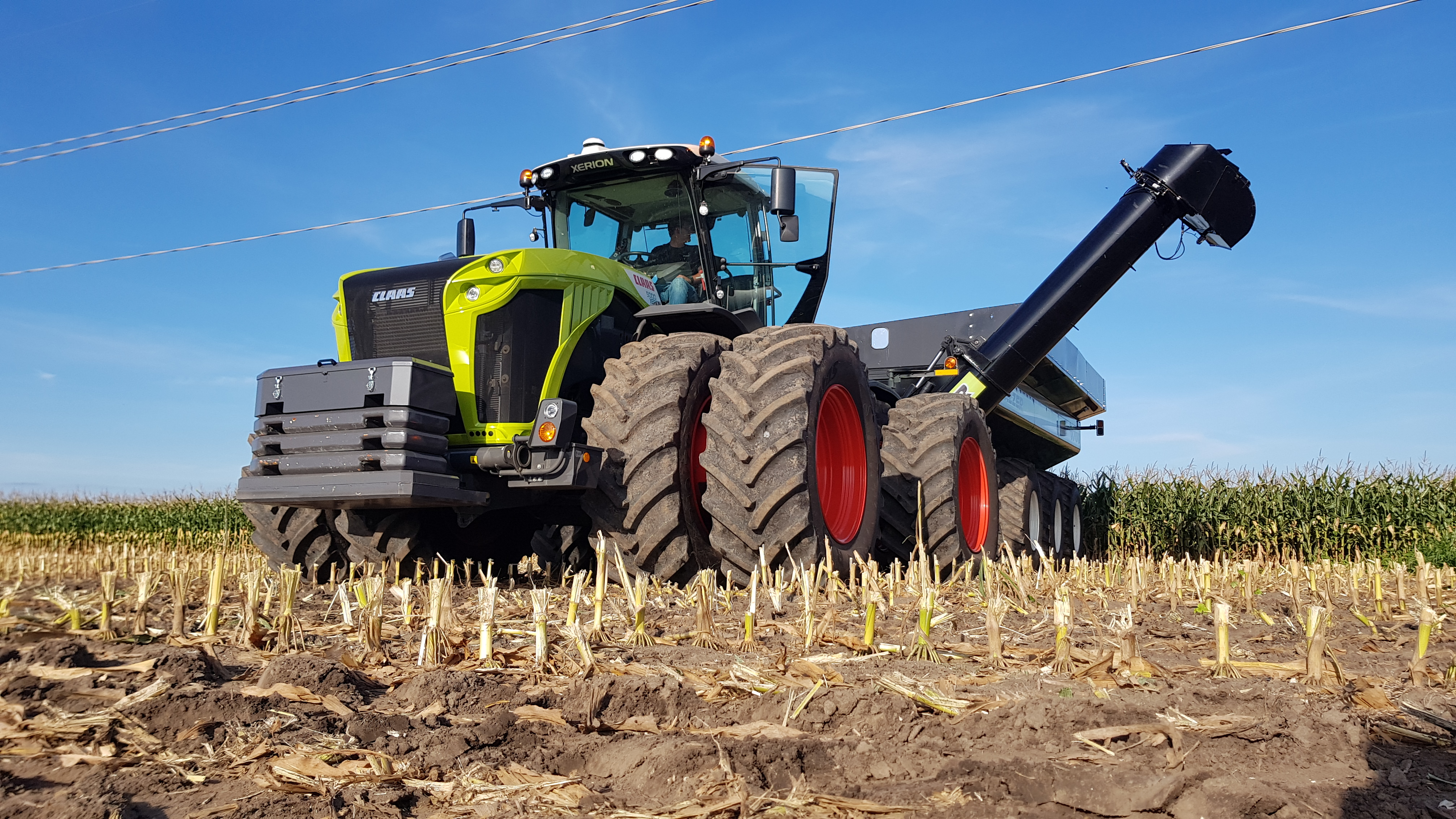
CLAAS XERION tractor

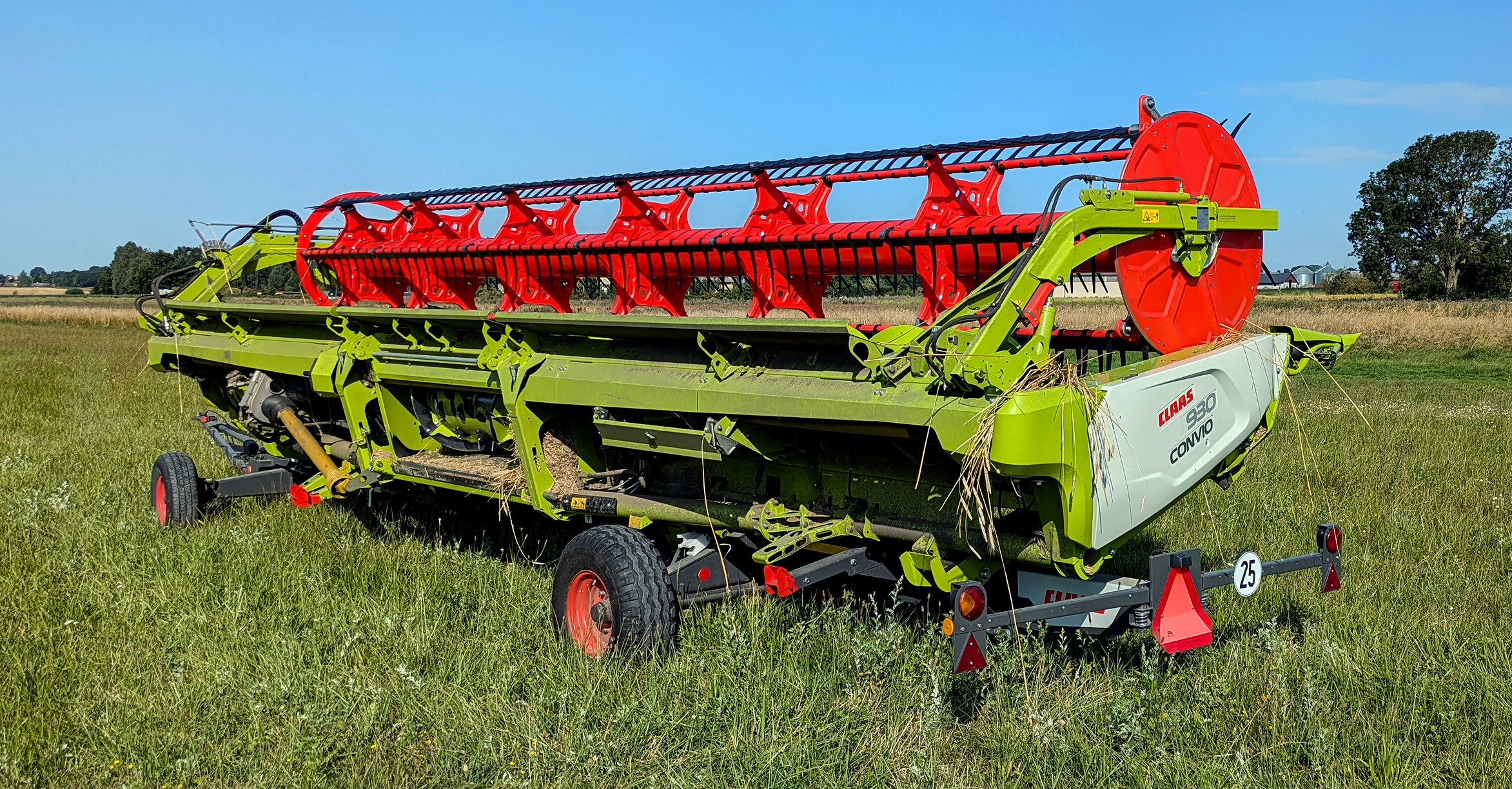
Claas 930 Convio

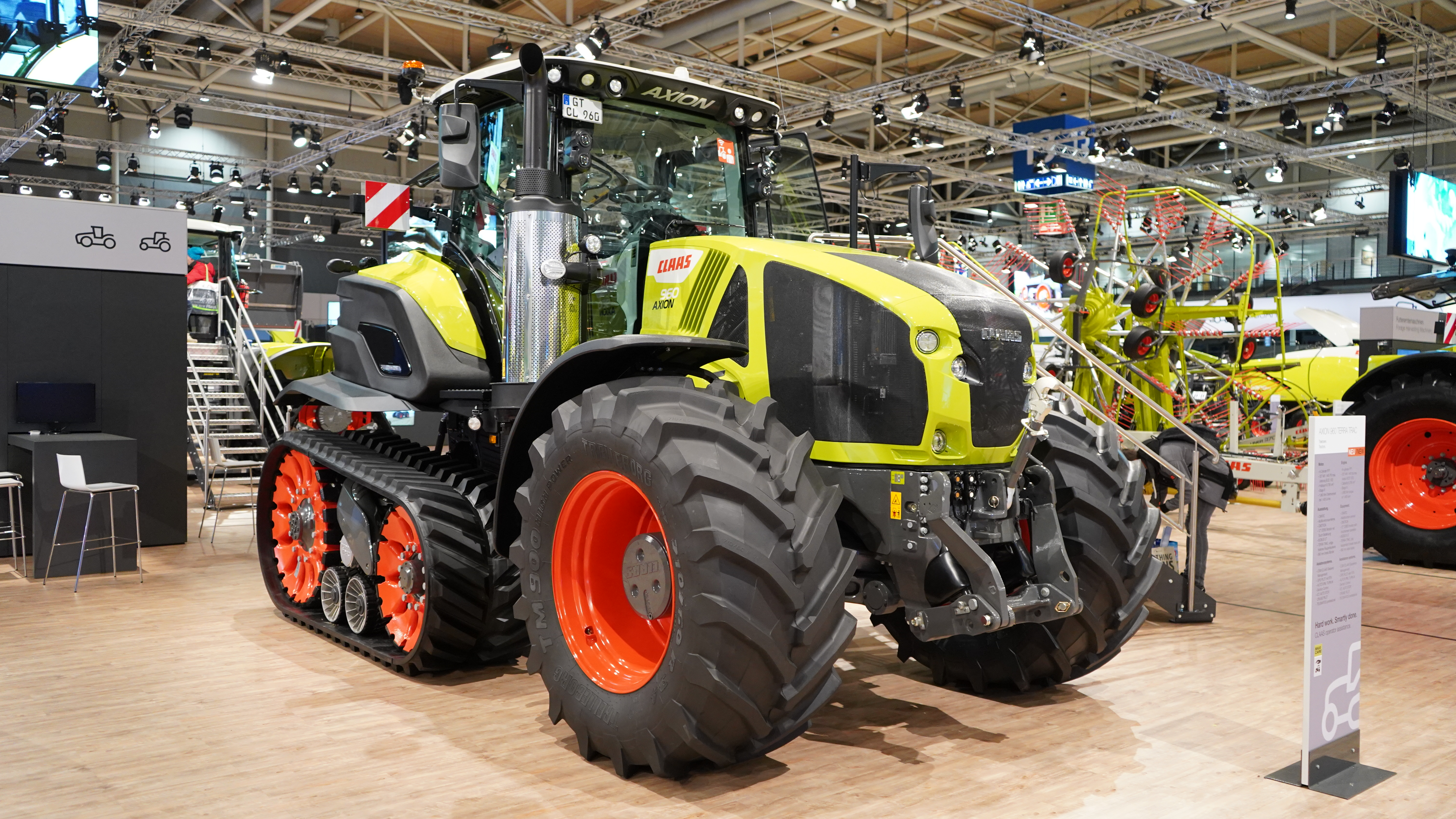
AXION 960 TERRA TRAC

CLAAS is an agricultural machinery manufacturer based in Harsewinkel, Germany, in the federal state of North Rhine Westphalia. Founded in 1913 by August Claas, CLAAS is a family business and one of the market and technology leaders in harvesting technology. It is the European market leader in combine harvesters and considered as world market leader in self-propelled forage harvesters. The product range also includes tractors, balers, mowers, rakes, tedders, silage trailers, wheel loaders, telehandlers and other harvesting equipment as well as farming information technology. CLAAS employs around 11,650 employees worldwide and reported a turnover of roughly 4.9 billion euros in the 2025 financial year. About 77.6% of sales were generated outside of Germany.

== History ==
=== Early days ===
The beginnings of the company go back to 1887, when Franz Claas founded a company in Clarholz for the production of milk centrifuges. From about 1900 onwards, he also manufactured other agricultural machinery there, such as straw binders and cutters for mowing machines.

The official foundation of the company took place in 1913, when the son of Franz Claas, August Claas, informed the responsible office in Herzebrock that he was manufacturing straw binders with two locksmiths and one unskilled worker. In 1914 his brothers Franz jun. and Bernhard Claas also joined the company. The company was then continued under the name "Gebr. Claas". The fourth brother, Theo, officially joined the company as a partner in 1935.

=== Growth period ===
After their return from the First World War, the Claas brothers and sisters moved their company to Harsewinkel in 1919, where they bought a disused hard stone factory and continued production. The export of Claas products now also began from Harsewinkel, initially to The Netherlands, France and Belgium.

In 1930, the development of the first CLAAS combine harvester began, initially as machines using the fore-cut principle. The first CLAAS straw baler was produced in 1931. In 1936, the company launched the first combine harvester designed specifically for European harvesting conditions, the combine harvester (ger. Mäh-Dresch-Binder – MDB). This was then mass-produced from 1937. Until the production was stopped due to the war in 1943, approx. 1400 machines were produced.

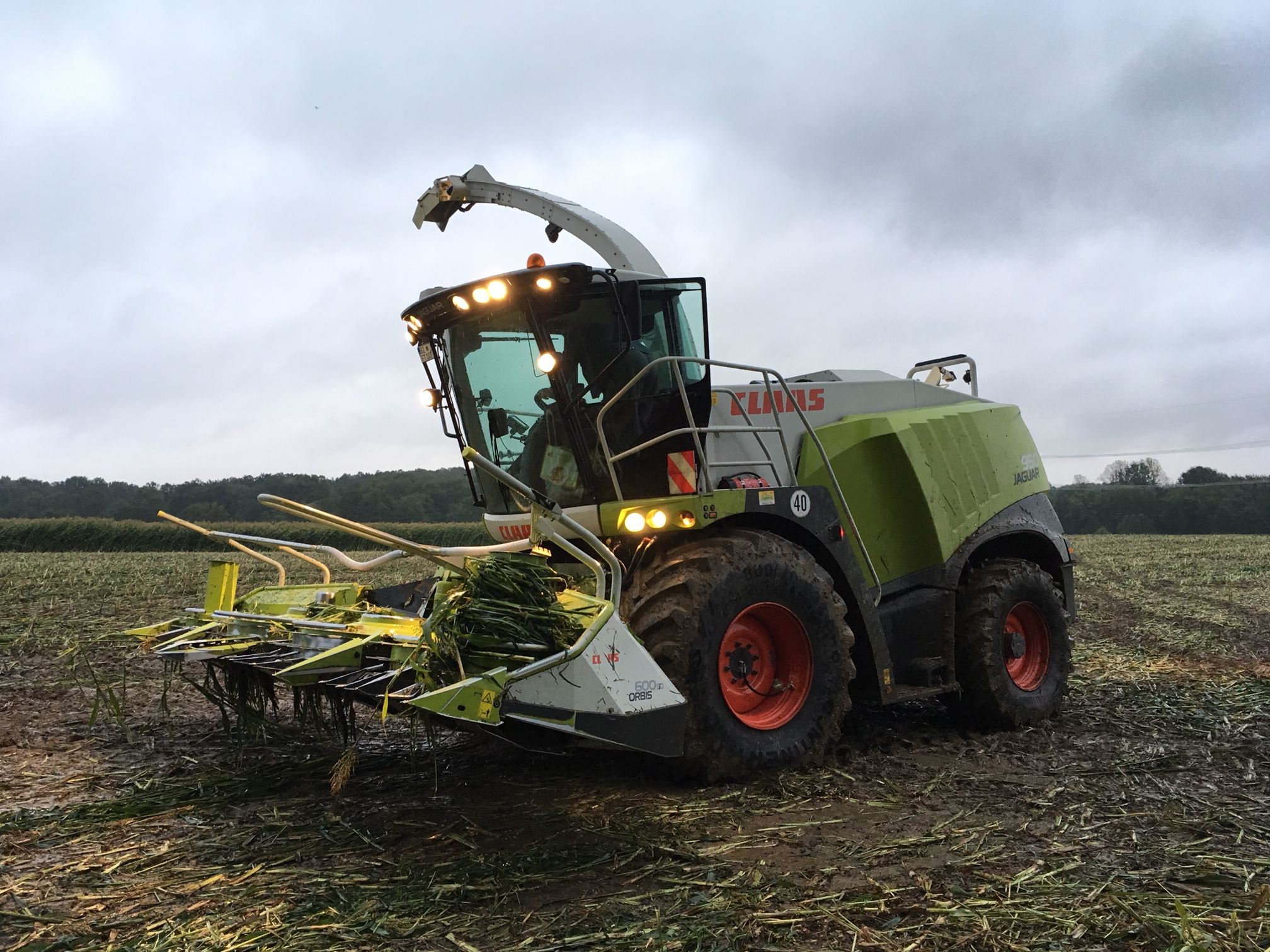
CLAAS JAGUAR

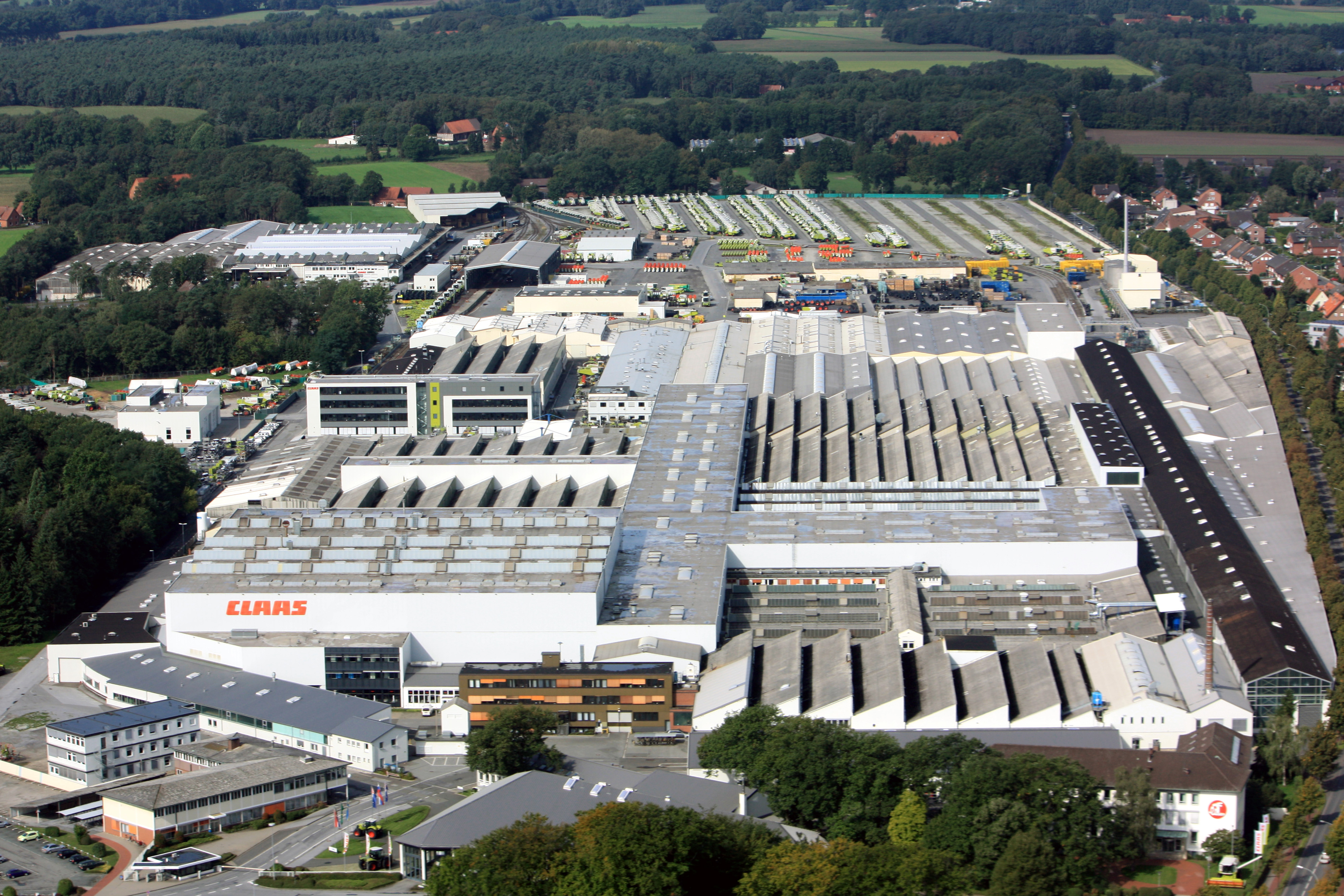
CLAAS production facility in Harsewinkel

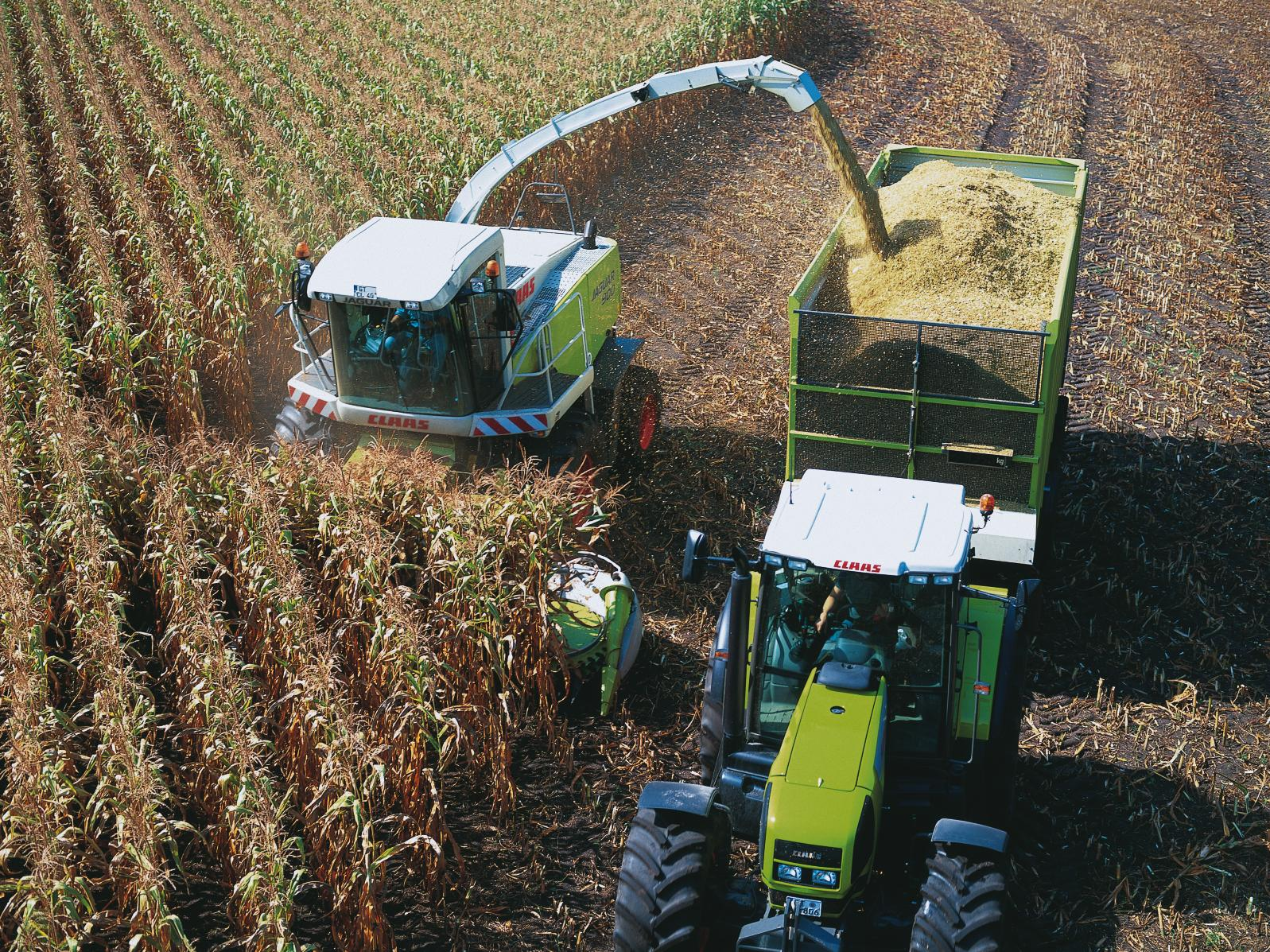
CLAAS tractor, CLAAS forage harvester

At the same time as the 1000th combine harvester was built in 1942, development of the CLAAS SUPER began. Production was interrupted as Claas began to build military equipment for the Nazi administration and employed 336 forced laborers. This stopped when August Claas was arrested by allied forces in early 1945. The Claas company contributed 500.000 DM to a compensation fund in 2001.

After WW2 Claas took up agricultural production again and the CLAAS SUPER came onto the market in 1946. By the end of production in 1978, more than 65,000 units had been produced by this combine harvester family.

In 1956 a new factory was established in Paderborn. This was now the third location besides the plant in Harsewinkel and the Christophorus-Hütte in Gütersloh-Blankenhagen, which was built in 1948. In 1961, the new CLAAS baler factory in Metz (France) was added, which has been operating under the name Usines Claas France S.A. since 1969.

Helmut Claas, the son of August Claas, became managing director for Engineering in 1962. By then CLAAS was already the No. 1 combine harvester manufacturer in Europe. 1969 saw the takeover of Josef Bautz AG in Saulgau with a factory for forage harvesting machinery. One year later, the Speiser company from Göppingen, which specialised in forage harvesting technology. The company continued to grow steadily and presented new products for forage harvesting such as mowers, tedders, windrowers, loader wagons and trailed forage harvesters.

In 1978 Helmut Claas took over as chairman of the management board.

=== Establishment as a global agricultural technology company ===
Since the 1990s, the company has strengthened its international presence in non-European countries. New production and sales locations were established in India (1993), the US (1999), Russia (2005), China (2012/2014) and South America, among others. With the acquisition of a majority stake in Renault Agriculture in 2003, CLAAS expanded its product range to include standard tractors. On 11 February 2003, the 400,000th combine harvester left the production line at the main plant in Harsewinkel.

In 2011 the LEXION 770 set a Guinness World Record with 675.84 tonnes of grain harvested in eight hours.

With the construction of the new development center for electronics in Dissen, Lower Saxony, CLAAS set the course for another important future field in 2017: the digitalization of agriculture.

Since 1 April 2023, the company has been led by Jan-Hendrik Mohr.

=== Operations in Russia amid international sanctions ===
CLAAS has continued its operations in Russia despite the Russian invasion of Ukraine.

As of 2025, Claas continues to operate in Russia despite the ongoing Russian invasion of Ukraine and international sanctions. The company maintains a production plant in Krasnodar and an office in Moscow, employing over 2,000 staff. These operations place Claas among the top 100 revenue-generating international companies still active in the Russian market. Experts have condemned Claas for indirectly enabling Russia’s violations of international humanitarian law through its continued presence. Recent Russian legislation requires companies operating in the country to support military mobilization efforts, raising concerns that Claas may be contributing, directly or indirectly, to Russia's war against Ukraine. This situation also poses significant reputational and legal risks for the company, particularly under Germany's Supply Chain Due Diligence Act, which mandates corporate accountability for human rights impacts.

== Product portfolio ==
CLAAS is well known as harvest specialist, offering combine harvesters in various sizes. The largest model series is the LEXION, which has been produced since 1995 and is now in its fourth generation. The LEXION 8900 has a maximum output of 790 hp and is available with tyres or crawler tracks (TERRA TRAC) on the front axle. Both options allow a top speed of 31 mph (50 km/h). The cutter bars are up to 13.79 meters wide and the grain tank holds up to 18,000 liters. CLAAS offers also the two smaller combine product families, the TRION and the EVION. CLAAS also offers a TUCANO 320 from the former TUCANO range which consisted of the TUCANO 500, TUCANO 400, and the TUCANO 300, which was only recently discontinued in Favour of the TRION/EVION Ranges.

In August 2021, CLAAS unveiled a new product line of harvesters called TRION. The TRION is a replacement for the larger TUCANO models and the smaller 2012-2019 Lexion harvesters. The range consists of the TRION 700, TRION 600, and TRION 500 series. They are powered by Cummins engines.

In July 2023, CLAAS unveiled the new EVION 400 Harvester range, a replacement for the previous AVERO and smaller TUCANO models.

The CLAAS forage harvester is called JAGUAR. CLAAS is considered as world market leader in the silage chopper market.

The manufacturer produces and sells tractors from 47 hp to 653 hp. The XERION is the biggest tractor in the CLAAS product range, and is easy to recognize with four equally-sized wheels.

The AXION model series is available from 205 hp (AXION 800) to 445 hp in the AXION 960. Since 2019, CLAAS has offered an optional track system for the AXION 900 series, instead of the rear wheels, called TERRA TRAC providing an exceptionally smooth operation with reduced ground compaction.

The ARION model range consists of Tractors ranging from 95 hp (ARION 410) to 205 hp (ARION 660). The ARION model range includes the ARION 400, ARION 500, ARION 600, and ARION 600C.

Product Range
Combine harvesters	Self-propelled forage harvesters	Headers	Tractors	Balers	Wheel loaders	Telehandlers	Forage harvesting machinery	Grain transport trailer / tipper
LEXION 8900-7400	JAGUAR 1200-1080	VARIO	XERION 5000-4000 12.650-12.540	QUADRANT 5300-4000	TORION 1914-535	SCORPION 1033-635	DISCO	CARAT
LEXION 6900-5300	JAGUAR 990-930	CONVIO	AXION 960-920	ROLLANT 620-375			CORTO	
TRION 760-750	JAGUAR 880-840	CERIO	AXION 870-800	VARIANT 485-450			VOLTO	
TRION 730-720		SWATH UP	ARION 660-610	MARKANT 650			LINER	
TRION 660-520		ROVIO	ARION 550-510				CARGOS 9600-740	
EVION 450-410		PICK UP	ARION 460-410					
		DIRECT DISC	ATOS 350-220					
		CORIO CONSPEED	ELIOS 240-210					
		ORBIS	AXOS 3 / 200					

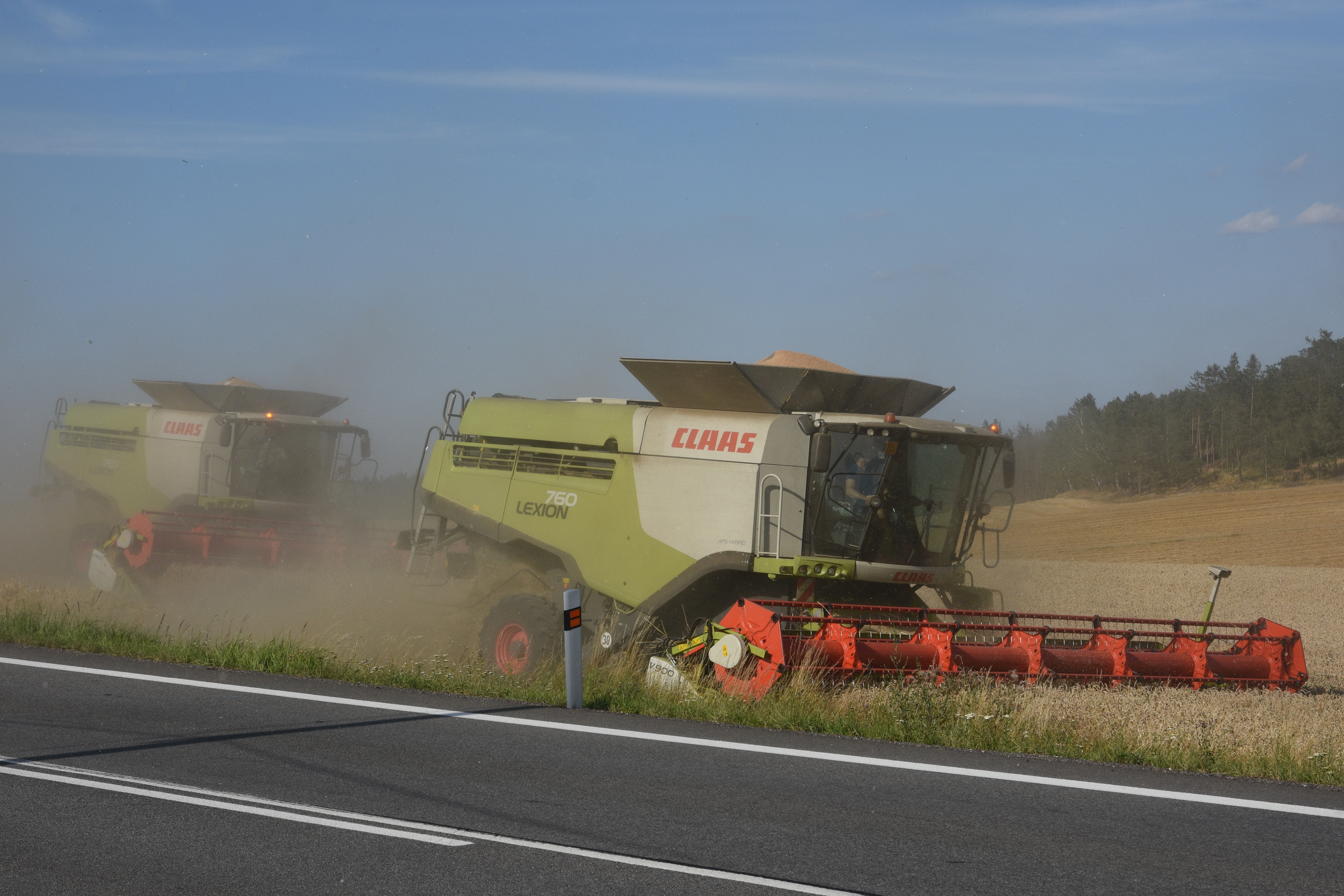
LEXION 760 in grain harvest

== Company locations ==
Drone video of CLAAS Tucano 430 combine harvester and tractor on a field in Jõgevamaa, Estonia

CLAAS is an international company active worldwide.

=== Harsewinkel, Germany ===
Harsewinkel, CLAAS' headquarters, hosts the company's administration and a major factory.

The Harsewinkel plant was opened in 1919. Combine harvesters have been manufactured here since 1936. To date, over 400,000 have been built. CLAAS also produces forage harvesters and the XERION tractor in Harsewinkel. Between 2000 and 2003, the factory was expanded so that not only finished machines but also individual components for other CLAAS plants can be produced. The machines manufactured at the main plant in Harsewinkel are transported about half by rail and half by truck. The choice of the means of transport depends mainly on the destination country. To Western Europe (especially Germany, France, Spain), transport is mainly by road. To the seaports of Bremen and Hamburg as well as to Southeast and Eastern Europe (especially Poland, Romania and former CIS states) rail transport is predominant. The importance of rail traffic is reflected in the fact that as early as 1967, a 3.1-kilometer-long connecting railway was built, leading from the Ibbenbüren – Gütersloh line of the Teutoburger Wald-Eisenbahn (TWE) to the company's own Harsewinkel-West works station.

=== Bad Saulgau, Germany ===
CLAAS's facilities in Bad Saulgau develop, test and manufacture forage harvesting machines and attachments. Additionally, the chopper unit of the JAGUAR comes from this production site. The Bad Saulgau site is also home to a test center for forage harvesting technology and the CLAAS Group's Competence Center for Tractor-Implement-Automation (TIM).

=== Le Mans, France ===
Following the acquisition of a majority stake in Renault Agriculture, CLAAS has also been offering a complete range of tractors since 2003. All CLAAS tractor models except of the XERION are manufactured at the Le Mans factory, two hours' drive southwest of Paris. In 2021, a three-year refurbishment of the factory was completed.

=== Metz, France ===
At the CLAAS plant in Metz, 400 employees manufacture balers for the agricultural industry. Since the start of production in 1958, over 300,000 have been manufactured. Each type of baler is produced on its own welding and sheet metal processing line. This saves costly retooling and enables the simultaneous production of all models.

=== Törökszentmiklós, Hungary ===
800 employees work at the Hungarian location Törökszentmiklós, southeast of Budapest. It has been part of the CLAAS Group since 1997 and has developed into the competence center for cutter bars and drum mowers.

=== Columbus, Indiana and Omaha, Nebraska, US ===
CLAAS machines have been harvesting on North American fields since the 1950s. Since the founding of the CLAAS of America (COA) sales company in 1979 and the subsequent laying of the foundation stone in Columbus, Indiana, in 1981, sales have been handled by CLAAS dealers. With the growing business in the United States, the spare parts department in Columbus, which is responsible for the entire US and Canada, has also been greatly expanded.

The production company CLAAS Omaha (COL) has been manufacturing LEXION combine harvesters since 1999. COL is also jointly responsible for product development of the US machines. The plant is located in the largest grain growing areas in the US and was initially operated in cooperation with Caterpillar – since 2002 fully owned by CLAAS. Today, the LEXION combine harvesters are no longer sold exclusively through Caterpillar dealers, but also through other distribution channels. Until 2019 the combines produced in Omaha had a yellow and black paint. With the start of the production of the new LEXION model series for the North American market at the factory in Omaha, Nebraska color scheme changed to the typical CLAAS green-white-red.

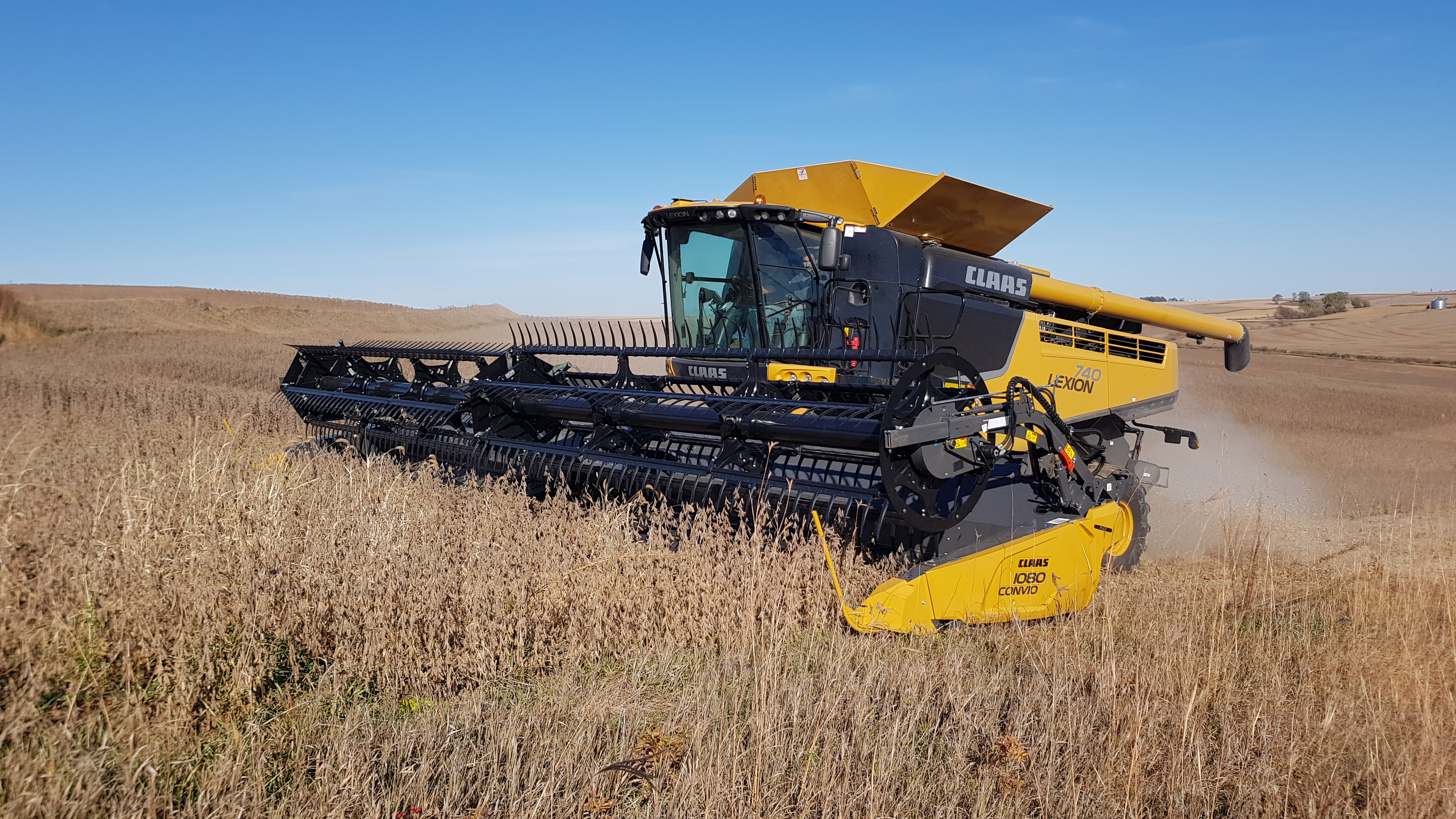
CLAAS LEXION 740 in yellow and black paint scheme

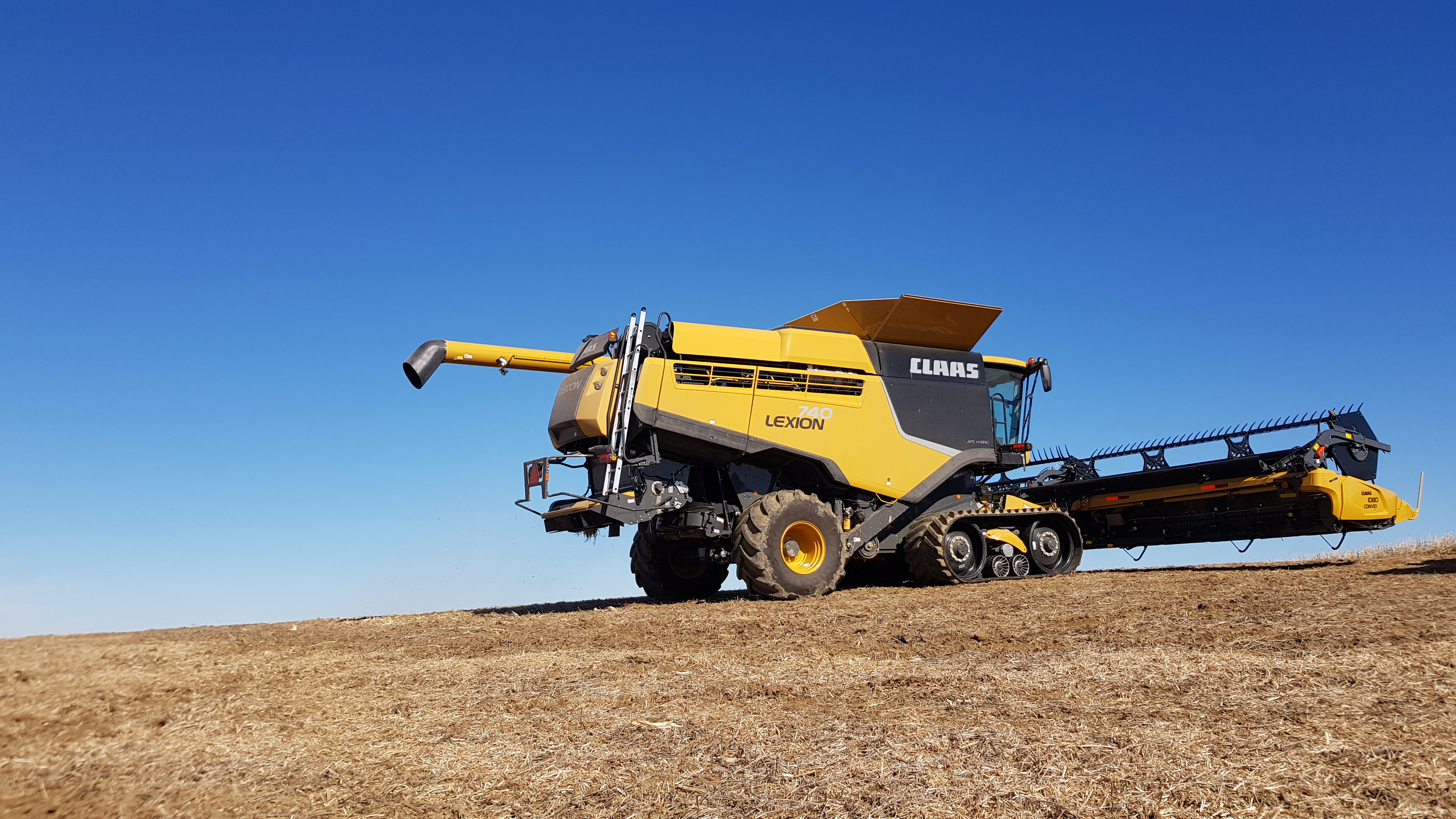
CLAAS LEXION 740 in yellow and black paint scheme

=== Krasnodar, Russia ===
The factory in Krasnodar, located in the granary of Russia, started operations in 2005. This made CLAAS the first major agricultural engineering manufacturer to operate its own production facilities in Russia. The production facility in Krasnodar is designed for a capacity of 1,000 machines per year and aims to develop into a local center of excellence in agricultural engineering. In 2015, the company invested a further 120 million euros in the expansion of the plant. Combine harvesters are produced there including metalworking, painting and assembly.

=== Sunchales, Argentina ===
As early as the 1950s, CLAAS sold harvesting machines to Argentina. The local subsidiary has existed since 2000 in Sunchales, Provinz Santa Fé. In addition, five further spare parts and service centers ensure that CLAAS service is guaranteed throughout Argentina.

In 2006 the possibility that CLAAS Argentina set up a factory in Argentina was tangible and by 2013, began to produce the TUCANO combine harvester, with a motor of 270 to 360 hp (Class VI or VIII). Models produced include the TUCANO 570, TUCANO 470 and TUCANO 560. At the same time, the company advanced assembly capacity.

In the town of Ameghino, Buenos Aires, CLAAS manufactures headers and other equipment and components.

=== Chandigarh, India ===
CLAAS opened a plant near Chandigarh in 2008. It is located 300 km north of New Delhi, in the middle of the most fertile areas of Northern India. The plant is designed for a capacity of around 900 combine harvesters per year. The CROP TIGER combine harvester is mainly produced in the Chandigarh plant in both wheeled and TERRA TRAC tracked versions. With the crawler tracks, this machine is particularly suitable for wet soils and is therefore sold in Southern India, Sri Lanka, South Korea and other South-East Asian countries. The wheeled version of the CROP TIGER is mainly used in dry conditions such as in Northern India, the Middle East and Africa.
