= Renault Agriculture =

Agricultural machinery division of the car manufacturer (1918-2008)

Renault Agriculture S.A.S.
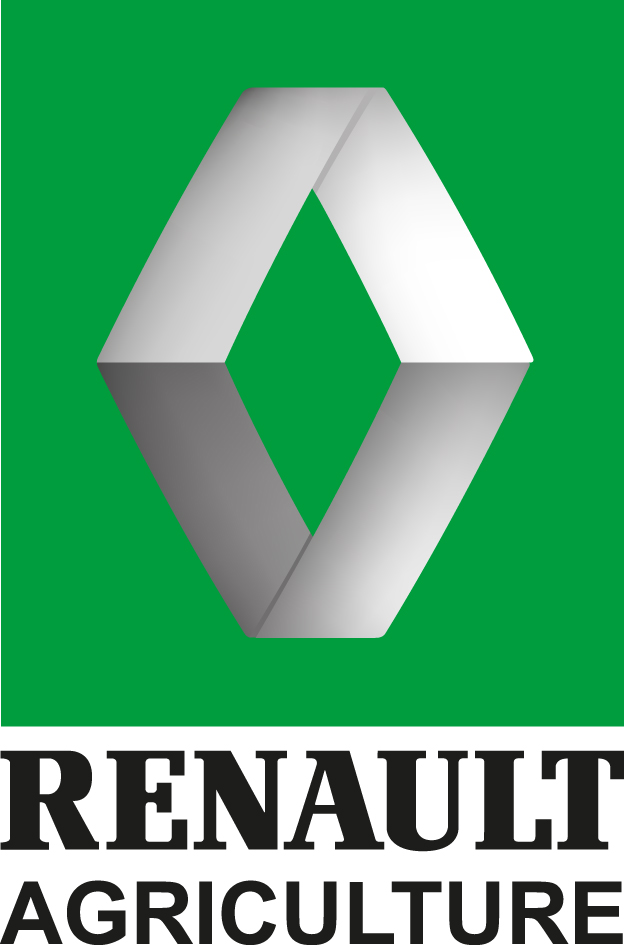
- Company type: Subsidiary
- Industry: Agricultural machinery
- Founded: 11 November 1918
- Founder: Louis Renault
- Defunct: 2008
- Successor: Claas Tractor S.A.S. Auto Châssis International SNC
- Headquarters: Le Mans, France
- Parent: Renault

Renault Agriculture S.A.S. (French pronunciation: [ʁəno aɡʁikyltyʁ(ə)]) was the agricultural machinery division of the French car manufacturer Renault established in 1918 from its armored military vehicles division. While in operation, Renault Agriculture had various partnerships with major manufacturers and focussed production on tractors. The company was sold between 2003 and 2008 to German rival Claas. Renault Agriculture was dissolved in 2008 and its facilities became part of Claas' tractor division. Claas' tractor division and Renault's Auto Châssis International are Renault Agriculture successors.

== History ==
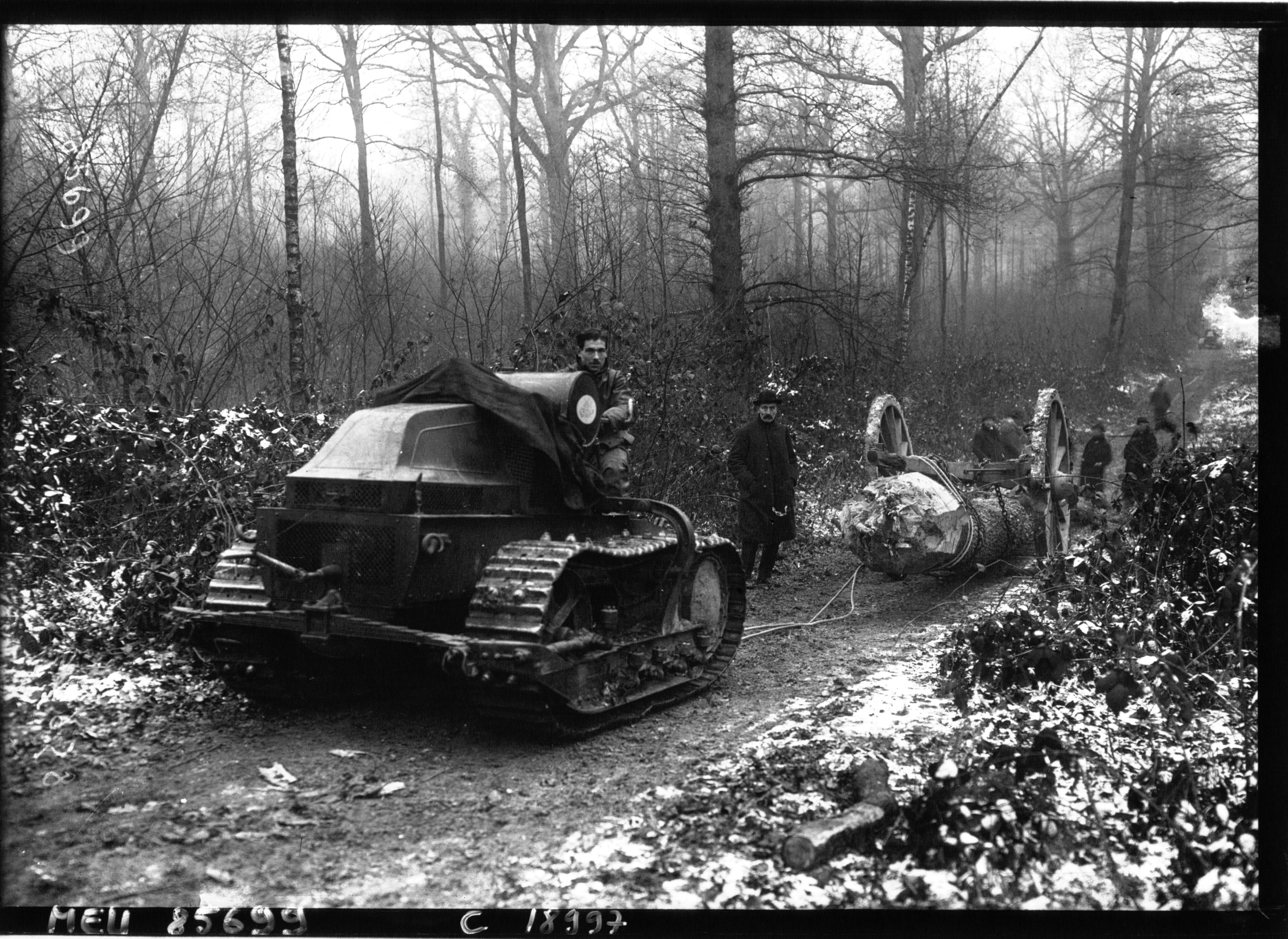
A Renault HI tracked tractor in 1920

After the end of World War I, the Renault company used its experience in armoured tanks to devise agricultural vehicles. The Renault's Department 14 (responsible for the FT tank) developed the first tractor of the company, the Type GP, which was powered by an engine similar to that of the FT (a four-cylinder) and had tracks. The most distinguishable differences of the new tractor with the FT were the front-engine design and the reduced weight. The tractors were assembled in Renault's Billancourt factory since 11 November 1918 on the same production lines that the tanks had used and tested at Louis Renault's farm in Herqueville. The Type HO introduced in 1921 replaced the tracks by more conventional wheels. In 1926, Renault introduced the Type PE which was extensively revised compared to its predecessors, incorporating a new engine with reduced consumes and a vertical radiator. In 1931, with the PE1, the radiator was moved from the middle position used in the previous models to the front and, in 1933, the model became the first France-produced rubber-wheeled tractor. The company also started to develop versions for specific markets, as vineyards. With the aim of reducing the fuel costs, it introduced its first diesel-engined model, the Type VI, in 1932. By 1938, Renault was producing about 40 tractors per month and was the largest French manufacturer.

In 1920, Renault founded the Le Mans engineering centre. Shortly after, plans to move the agricultural machinery production to the new site were revealed. However, the new factory was inaugurated in 1940 and the production was stopped because of World War II. Following the war and nationalisation, the Le Mans plant resumed production. The location was divided into a foundry section, a mechanical parts section (supplying the factories of Flins and Billancourt), a painting section and a tractor manufacturing section. At the time, Le Mans was the third largest Renault's operation in France after Billancourt and Cléon. The following years saw the arrival of the D, N, E and Super model series. In 1956, Renault Agriculture standardised the orange colour for its models. In 1950, Renault was the largest tractor manufacturer within France, producing 8,549 units, the 58% of the country's total production. In 1961, Renault introduced the 385 model, with a 12-gear transmission. Apart from its own engines, Renault used MWM and Perkins units. In the 1960s, it produced the One-Sixty Diesel for Allis-Chalmers. In 1968, the company introduced its first four-wheel drive model. In 1972, Renault partnered with Carraro and sold some models of that company with the Renault badge. During the 1970s and 1980s, it also sold models from Mitsubishi. At the 1981 SIMA exhibition Renault Agriculture unveiled the TX range, with comfort elements designed in collaboration with the Renault's car division. The last Renault tractors had ancient gods' names.

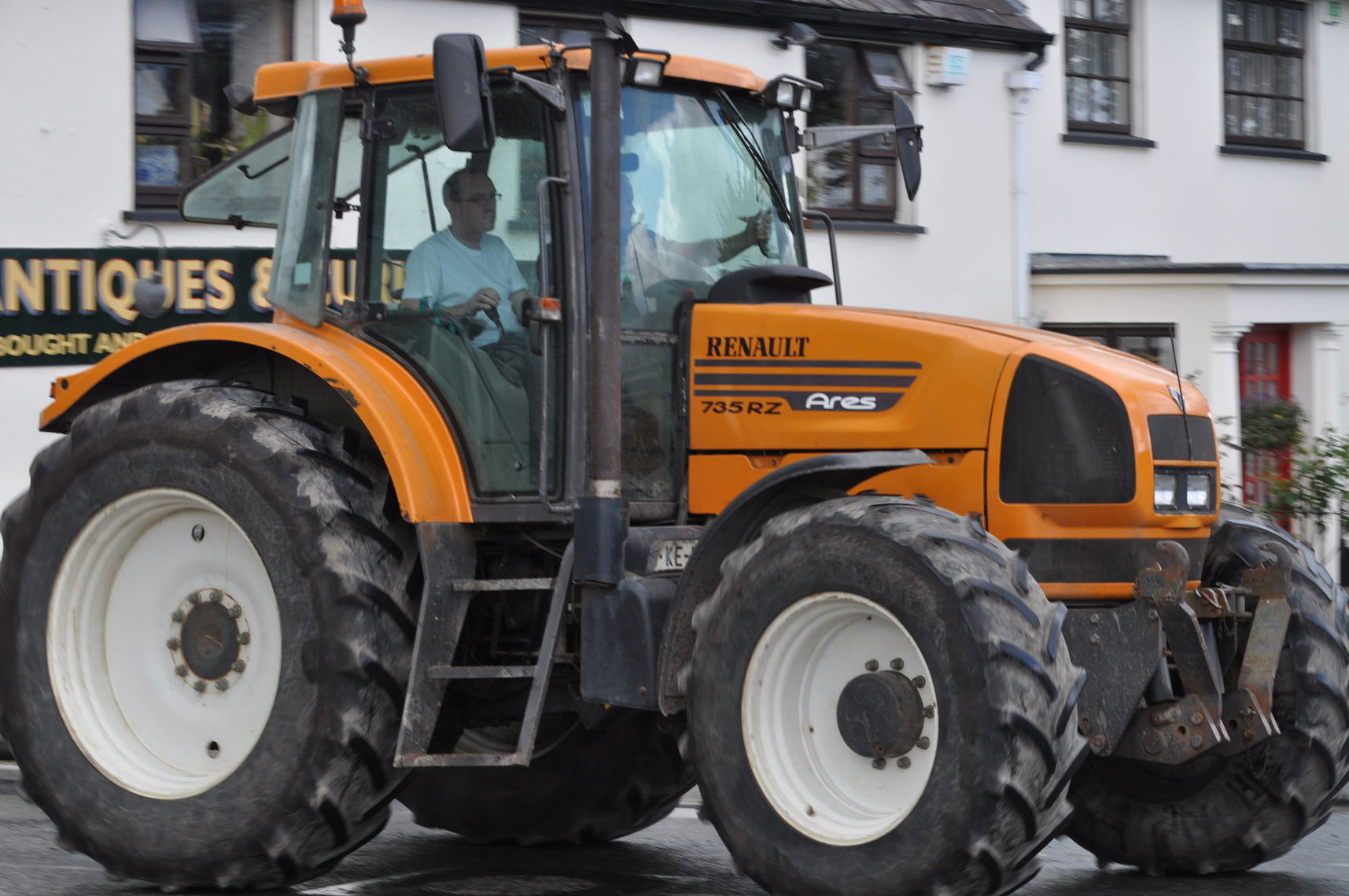
An Arès, one of the last models of Renault Agriculture.

From late 1993 to 1998, Renault Agriculture and John Deere had a partnership agreement by which the former received John Deere engines manufactured at the Saran factory and in return it supplied John Deere with tractors marketed as the 3000 series. In 1994, Renault Agriculture and Massey Ferguson formed a strategic partnership, as part of which they set up an equally owned joint venture called Groupement International de Mécanique Agricole (GIMA) at a facility located next to Massey's Beauvais factory with the aim of manufacturing transaxles and related components. In 1995, Renault Agriculture agreed to market products from the British agricultural machinery manufacturer JCB through its dealership network in France. In 1997, the company took a 16.6% stake of Rovigo-based Agritalia, a manufacturer of orchard tractors for various clients. In 2000, it purchased a stake in the Indian manufacturer International Tractors (the owner of the Sonalika marque), forming a Sonalika-Renault joint venture. In 2003, as part of a plan to shed non-core assets, Renault sold a 51% majority stake in Renault Agriculture's tractor manufacturing plant to Claas. In 2006, Claas increased its ownership to 80% and in 2008 took full control and renamed it Claas Tractor. By 2005, the Renault marque was phased out and all the tractor models produced at Le Mans were badged as Claas.

== Renault Agriculture's successors ==
=== Claas Tractor ===
Claas Tractor S.A.S. is a subsidiary of the Claas group and its main tractor manufacturing operation since 2003. Most of the company's models are manufactured within the facility.

=== ACI Renault ===
Auto Châssis International SNC (Le Mans Renault Factory)
- Built: 1920
- Coordinates: 47.9811369°N 0.1832667°E
- Area: 69 ha (170 acres)
- Address: Auto Châssis International, 15 avenue Pierre Piffault, 72086 Le Mans, France

In 1999, Renault created the subsidiary Auto Châssis International SNC to manage the foundry and parts area of Le Mans. ACI has worldwide operations and supplies the Renault-Nissan Alliance. Production is organised in three departments. The site also has an engineering centre.
