= HMS Renard (1803) =

History

France
- Name: Renard
- Namesake: The fox, an animal of the genus Vulpes
- Builder: Michel Colin-Olivier, Dieppe
- Laid down: March 1793
- Launched: Early June 1793
- Acquired: April 1793
- Captured: November 1803

United Kingdom
- Name: HMS Renard
- Acquired: By capture 1803
- Renamed: HMS Crafty
- Fate: Captured 1807

General characteristics
- Type: Schooner
- Tons burthen: 146 (bm)
- Length: 76 ft 5 in (23.3 m)
- Beam: 19 ft 10 in (6.0 m)
- Complement: French service:110; 80 at capture; British service:60 (plan); 48 (actual)
- Armament: French service; Originally: 12 × 4-pounder guns + 6 × swivel guns; Later: 4 × 6-pounder guns + 6 × 4-pounder guns; 1795: 12 × 6-pounder guns; At capture: 12 × 4-pounder guns + 6 × swivel guns; British service: 12 × 12-pounder carronades + 2 × 4-pounder guns

HMS Renard was a 12-gun schooner, previously the French navy schooner Renard. HMS Cameleon captured her in 1803 off Corsica and the Royal Navy took her into service under her existing name. The already being an HMS Renard (a sloop), on the West Indies station, at some point between 1804 and 1807 the schooner's name was changed to HMS Crafty. During her brief service Renard/Crafty captured several merchantmen and a small armed vessel. In 1807 three Spanish privateers captured her.

== French career ==
Renard was originally a lugger built and launched at Dieppe in June 1793. The French Navy purchased her on the ways in April 1793. Under the command of enseigne de vaisseau non entretenu Troquet, in October the lugger Renard sailed from Havre to Brest. From 27 January 1794 to the end of the year, Renard was under the command of enseigne de vaisseau non entretenu Catelain. She cruised, carried out liaison missions, and escorted convoys between la Hougue and Boulogne-sur-Mer. The next year, first under Catelain, and then lieutenant de vaisseau Bigot, Renard protected the herring fisheries off Havre, escorted convoys, and inspected facilities between Cherbourg and Boulogne-sur-Mer.

On 21 November 1800, Renard was still under Constantin's command when she fought a British cutter, apparently inconclusively, in Île-d'Aix Roads. She then returned to Rochefort for a week. Between 1800 and 1803, Renard was converted to a schooner rig.

In November 1803, the schooner Renard, under the command of lieutenant de vaisseau Jacques Constantin, was escorting a transport carrying troops from Calvi. French records attribute her capture on 25 November to HMS Cameleon and HMS Victory, and report that Renard surrendered after having been fired on for hours by two ships, one being Cameleon.

== Capture ==
British records differ. On 16 November Cameleon was part of Nelson's squadron off Corsica. She was lying nearly becalmed off Cap Corse, when her captain sighted an armed schooner escorting a transport. He deployed the boats, which succeeded in capturing the French naval schooner Renard, of 12 guns. Stately went in chase of the transport, a brig, and captured her. In his dispatches, Nelson simply attributed the capture to his squadron, though Victory's log in the Admiralty records Cameleon and Stately as the captors. Nelson's letter described Renard as being armed with twelve 4-pounder guns and six swivel guns, and carrying a crew of 80 men. The transport brig was the Titus, and she was taking 96 troops to Toulon. Stately then escorted both prizes to Malta.

== Royal Navy career ==
There the officers of the Malta Yard surveyed her; after she was found fit for service the navy commissioned her as Renard and Nelson appointed Lieutenant Richard Spencer, who had earlier served on Cameleon and had transferred to Triumph, to command her. Nelson suggested that she should have a crew of 60 men, including two boys, and that Spencer apply to Sir Alexander Ball, the British governor of Malta, for Maltese to man her. Nelson further directed that Renard serve Ball for the protection of Malta's commerce and such other services as Ball would determine. Renard was later renamed Crafty but the two names coexisted for a time.

While escorting a convoy of merchantmen Crafty drove on shore and destroyed a Cisalpine 4-gun privateer that had come out from Syracuse. This occurred on 28 July 1804, and resulted in Nelson writing a letter of reprimand to Spencer. Because of the weather, Spencer had permitted the four merchant vessels that he was escorting to anchor southward of Cape Moro di Porco (Capo Murro di Porco, five kilometers south of Syracuse). While they waited, he sailed to investigate a strange vessel in sight. Then another vessel came on the scene, having rounded the Cape from Syracuse, and approached the merchant vessels. The captains of those vessels feared the newcomer was a privateer, so they cut their cables and set sail towards Renard. Spencer decided to "chastise" the presumed privateer for violating the neutrality of Sicily and so sailed towards her. The newcomer then drove onto the rocks and landed her crew. Nelson pointed out that although destroying privateers that violated Sicily's neutrality was a worthwhile objective, Spencer's first responsibility was to protect the convoy and that he should not have left the merchantmen. Furthermore, had he stayed with them, he might have come to have legal ground to engage the newcomer [once it had revealed by its actions, such as firing a shot, that it was indeed a privateer]. Subsequently, King Ferdinand of the Kingdom of Naples and Sicily raised a concern about Spencer's possible violation of the Kingdom's neutrality and Nelson ordered an investigation. Spencer was apparently exonerated as nothing more eventuated.

In February 1806, there arrived at Malta three French vessels, prizes to Renard. Renard had captured off Maretimo (the westernmost of the Aegadian Islands, off the west coast of Sicily), a polacca sailing in ballast from Marseilles to Sicily. From her Spencer learned that there were two vessels fitting out at Gergenti for Genoa, well-manned and armed. Spenser gave Mr. Andrew Towill, Renard's master, permission to take 15 men in the captured polacca to seek them out. After 16 days, Towill encountered the two vessels. He chased them for six hours and fired muskets at them before they struck. The two vessels were polaccas, each armed with six guns, 16 muskets, and a chest of small arms, and having a crew of 18 men. The merchantmen suffered one man killed and three wounded before they surrendered. Their crews were Genoese and the vessels were carrying sulphur, gum, and almonds. Towill succeeded in getting all three polaccas safely back to Malta, where the court condemned them as legal prizes containing French goods. (Note: On 6 October 1807, Parliament granted £1138 10s 8d to the officers and crew of "H.M. schooner Renard", representing "2-3rds of the value of sundry Genoese Vessels". Spencer would have received at least a quarter of this grant (net of Renard's agent's fees), and possibly three eighths; five-eighths would have been divided among Renard's entire crew, not just the men on the polacca. Still, given the small size of the crew, it would have a notable sum, even for the ship's boys.)

July saw Crafty off the coast of Calabria. Amphion, under the command of Sir William Hoste, had supported British troops in the Battle of Maida. Hoste then sailed to Messina. There General Broderick asked Hoste to support the British and Neapolitan attack on Reggio. Reggio surrendered on 10 July; two days later Crafty, two Neapolitan gunboats, and three armed boats from Madras joined Amphion. A few days later a detachment of troops from the 78th Regiment of Foot under Lieutenant-Colonel M'Leod, joined them as well. On 25 July, Hoste's squadron sailed for Cape Cotrone (probably Capo Rizzuto). They arrived in time to anchor the next day by the river Tacina (Fiume Tacina) and fire on a column of French troops marching from Catanzaro to Cotrone, forcing the French inland. Cotrone surrendered on 30 July.

In October 1806 Ball sent Spencer to negotiate with the Dey of Algiers for the release of some Maltese whom the Algerians had enslaved before Malta became a British possession. As Spencer was about to leave, his mission unsuccessful, the Dey, expressing his wish to be friendly with Britain, released 30 men and two ladies who had been slaves for more than 15 years. He also requested that a British frigate come to take his ambassador to Constantinople. On Spencer's return, the Government of Malta presented him with a piece of plate valued at 100 guineas. At a later date, Spencer received a second piece of plate, this one worth 40 guineas, in appreciation of his efforts to protect Malta's trade.

On 2 January 1807 Spencer was ashore in Valletta while Crafty lay at anchor in the fairway. The 74-gun Eagle broke from her moorings and came up so close behind the schooner that it appeared that Eagle might destroy her. At daylight Spencer saw the situation. The seas were too rough for Crafty to be able to launch her boats so Spencer waved to draw his crew's attention, and then, stripping off his coats and boots, swam out to her. Once on board, he secured a spring on the anchor cable then cut and ran to a more secure anchorage. Throughout this manoeuvre, Eagle's crew stood by with ropes to rescue Crafty's crew should that be necessary.

== Fate ==
Crafty was on her way with dispatches from the Dardanelles when she stopped at Gibraltar. She sailed from Gibraltar on 7 March in company with the gun-brig Confounder but the two vessels did not coordinate. Crafty carried too much sail and Confounder too little, with the result that they separated. The next day Crafty encountered gunvessels from the Algeciras flotilla and although she escaped, she had a gun dismounted. She sailed towards the Barbary coast and on 9 March anchored in a small bay at north of Tetuan, awaiting a favourable wind.

In the afternoon, while she was at anchor, she sighted three lateen-rigged feluccas coming towards her. She cleared for action, and as they approached, cut her cables and sailed to engage them.

The three Spanish vessels were Gibraltar (aka Generalissimo), Hurón, and Pastora (aka Águila). Generalissimo and Hurón were armed with two 32-pounder carronades and two 6-pounder guns, and Pastora was armed with two 18-pounder carronades and two 6-pounder guns. All three had 70-man crews, augmented with volunteers. (Note: On 25 November 1806 Generalissimo had captured the British gunboat Hannah)

In the engagement Crafty lost her fore- and mainyards, which fell over her starboard side. When she could no longer maneuver, one of the three Spanish vessels placed a grapnel on her rudder, holding Crafty fast. The other two then came alongside, one on the bow and one on the quarter. Crafty's crew was able to repel the first boarding attempt, but had to surrender after the second succeeded in carrying her. In all, Crafty had lost three men killed and 14 wounded. One of the wounded may have died because Lloyd's List report that the British had suffered four men killed and nine wounded in their attack.

Spencer was wounded between the Spaniards' first and second attempts at boarding. He was again wounded during the fighting on deck when he received a blow from a cutlass against his head, knocking him down. His attacker was about to stab Spencer when Crafty's master, who was loading a musket, saw what was happening and fired the iron ramrod through the man, killing him instantly.

The Spaniards took Crafty into Ceuta. Marshall, in writing Spencer's biography, implied that Spanish casualties were triple those on Crafty, and reported that the Spanish commodore and his captain died while boarding Crafty. The Spaniards suffered nine dead and 13 wounded. Among the fatal casualties was Bartolomé Cacobí, Huron's captain.

At his court martial for the loss of Crafty, the court reprimanded Spencer for having failed to keep company with Confounder and for remaining too long at anchor in the bay.

== Post script ==
Crafty may have been recaptured. There exists a report that she arrived at Sheerness on 11 October 1807, and was sold for breaking up in 1809. However, the Renard that the Commissioners of the Navy offered for sale between December 1808 and May 1809 was a sloop. This suggests that the Renard in question was Renard, not the schooner Crafty.
