= HMS Cameleon (1795) =

Former Royal Navy vessel

- Chamelion (alternative spelling- Cameleon)

History

Great Britain
- Name: HMS Cameleon
- Ordered: 13 July 1795
- Builder: John Randall, Rotherhithe
- Laid down: July 1795
- Launched: 14 October 1795
- Commissioned: November 1795
- Out of service: Paid off in September 1805.
- Honours and awards: Naval General Service Medal with clasp: "Egypt"
- Fate: Broken up 1811

General characteristics
- Class & type: Diligence-class brig-sloop
- Type: 18-gun brig-sloop
- Tons burthen: 318 85/94 (bm)
- Length: 95 ft 1 in (29.0 m) (gundeck); 75 ft 1 1/2 in (22.9 m) (gundeck)
- Beam: 28 ft 32 in (9.3 m)
- Depth of hold: 12 ft 1 in (3.7 m)
- Sail plan: Brig
- Complement: 121
- Armament: 16 × 32-pounder carronades; 2 × 6-pounder chase guns

HMS Cameleon (or Camelion) was a Royal Navy Diligence-class brig-sloop, launched in 1795. She was built of fir (pitch pine), which allowed for rapid construction, but at the expense of durability. She captured some small vessels and a privateer, and served in the Mediterranean before being laid up in 1805, and broken up in 1811.

== French Revolutionary Wars ==
Cameleon was commissioned in November 1795 under Commander Richard Bennet. Commander Richard R. Boyer replaced Bennet in February 1796. Boyer sailed Cameleon for the Mediterranean on 22 February.

On 5 November 1796 Camelion captured Gustaf Frederick and eight days later Nostra Senora del Carmen.

On 24 February 1797, Cameleon captured the French vessels Elizabeth and Trois Enfants. Two days later Cameleon captured By Geval.

Between May and September, Lieutenant Viscount Falkland was acting captain of Cameleon. Boyer returned to command in November, and on 1 March 1798 was 10 leagues north of Guernsey when he sighted a cutter. Cameleon gave chase, but the wind was slight and the cutter's crew was able to row her to the safety under the guns on the Île de Batz. Boyer stated in his letter reporting the action that if he had had three more leagues he would have captured the cutter.

Still, the next day, Cameleon was more fortunate. At 3am she sighted another cutter, gave chase, and an hour later captured the privateer Souffleur. Souffleur was armed with four guns and two swivel guns, and had a crew of 40 men. She was 13 days out of Cherbourg and had captured four British vessels, the masters of three of which were aboard. The four British merchant vessels were:

- Sloop Peggy, of Cardigan, James Prichard, master, which had been sailing from Dover to Penzance, with wheat and barley;
- Brig Camilla, John M'Kenzie, master, which had been sailing from Hull to Plymouth with cod;
- Delaval, Charles Mann, master, which had been sailing from Sunderland to Plymouth with coals; and
- Betsey, of Guernsey, Thomas Townsend, master, which had been carrying wine to Plymouth.

Bowyer sent his prisoners into Portsmouth, and set off in chase of the privateer's prizes.

In June 1798 Commander John Stiles became captain of Cameleon, replacing Bowyer. Cameleon spent the year cruising and escorting convoys.

Around October 1798, Cameleon's boats cut the sloop Four Friends out of the Havre roads. Four Friends had been sailing from Portsmouth to Deptford when the French captured her. Unfortunately, Four Friends was lost in a gale off Beachy Head.

Stile sailed Cameleon to the Mediterranean on 4 March 1799. Cameleon arrived at Gibraltar on 5 May, having passed through a French squadron some eight or nine leagues west of Cape Spartel. The next day Cameleon departed for Malta to inform Captain Alexander Ball, who was in charge of the naval blockade at the siege of Malta, that the French fleet was in the Mediterranean. She was then to go on to Alexandria to also inform Sir Sidney Smith. Smith, in a later letter to Earl Spencer, alludes to mutinous conduct aboard Cameleon, and hopes that Stiles has rendered "His dissatisfied ship's company ashamed of their late conduct."

Shortly thereafter, on 14 June, Stiles was promoted to post captain on Theseus. (Captain Ralph Miller, Theseus's previous captain, had died in an explosion on board on 14 May.)

Lord Nelson had intended to appoint Commander Edward Canes, first lieutenant of Tigre, to command Cameleon. When Lieutenant Frederick Lewis Maitland returned from captivity shortly after the Spanish captured his command, the hired armed cutter Penelope in the action of 7 July 1799, Earl St Vincent promoted Maitland to commander, the promotion being backdated to 14 June, and gave him command of Cameleon. Maitland commanded her off the coast of Egypt, under Sir Sidney Smith, until the signing of the convention of al-'Arish on 24 January 1800. Maitland was sent home overland with dispatches, but quickly returned to his command until Lord Keith moved him to the command of the storeship Wassenar.

By April 1800 Cameleon was under the command of Lieutenant Samuel Jackson (acting). Between April and mid-May, Cameleon was part of a three-vessel naval squadron that, at the behest of Admiral Lord Keith, supported the Austrian force besieging the fortress of Savona. The naval force was under the command of Captain Hugh Downman in the frigate Santa Dorothea, and also included the Neapolitan brig Strombolo, under Captain Settimo. The little squadron's boats rowed guard off the harbour's mouth for 41 nights; the famished garrison surrendered to the allies on 15 May. Although Cameleon was committed to the blockade, she managed to share in a number of captures by other vessels.

On 14 April Phaeton and Peterel captured St. Rosalia. Cameleon was among the five vessels with which Phaeton had to share her share of the proceeds due to a prior agreement.

Next, Cameleon was among the vessels that shared in the proceeds of the capture off Genoa, on 28 April, of Proteus.

On 3 May, Mutine captured eight vessels in Anguilla Bay:

- Stella de Nort;
- Santa Maria;
- Nostra Senora del Carmine;
- Fiat Volantes Deus;
- Nostra Signora del Assunta;
- Nostra Signora de Sonsove;
- San Nicolas; and
- San Joseph (San Giuseppe).

Phaeton and Cameleon shared in the proceeds of the capture.

Mutine, Phaeton and Cameleon also shared in the proceeds of the capture five days later of eleven Genoese vessels. The first eight were captured at St Remo:

- Polacre ship St. Giovanni, which was sailing in ballast from St Remo;
- Polacre brig Achille, which was sailing from Marseilles to Genoa with a cargo of corn and wine;
- Polacre barque St. Antonio, which was sailing from Cette to Genoa with a cargo of wine;
- Polacre brig Santa (Assunta), which was sailing from Ard to Port Maurice with a cargo of wine;
- Polacre ship Conception, sailing in ballast to Port Maurice;
- Polacre ship Madona del Carmine, sailing from Cette to Genoa with a cargo of wine;
- Settee Signora del Carmine, which was sailing from Marseilles to Genoa with a cargo of corn;
- Settee St. Giuseppe, which was sailing from Marseilles to Port Maurice with a cargo of corn;
- Settee Immaculate Conception, which was sailing from Cette to Genoa with a cargo of wine;
- Settee Amina Purgatorio, which sailing from Cette to Genoa with a cargo of wine; and
- Settee Virgine Rosaria, which was sailing from Cette to Genoa with a cargo of wine.

Camelion was among the 19 vessels that shared in the proceeds of the capture of sundry boats of unknown name that carried corn into Genoa between 7 June (the day the city fell after a siege of some 60 days), and 16 June.

By 14 June Cameleon was under the command of Commander the Honourable George Dundas as she and Salamine shared in the capture on that day of the Genoese brig Anima Purgatoria, which was sailing from Bastia to Saleolight [sic]. On 4 August Cameleon captured the Genoese boat St. Antonio di Padova.

On 4 August Maitland was again in command of Camelion. On that day he was captain of Cameleon when she captured the Corsican privateer felucca Providence. Providence, of Bastia, was armed with two guns and carried a crew of 23 men.

Sixteen days later, Camelion drove a Spanish ketch, name unknown, on shore off the mouth of the Rhone. Maitland burnt the ketch, which had been armed with six guns.

By December, Cameleon was under the command of Commander James Dalrymple (acting). Maitland, however, had again returned to command her by the time of the British expedition to Egypt.

On 1 March 1801, some 70 British warships under the command of Admiral Lord Keith, Cameleon among them, together with transports carrying 16,000 troops, anchored in Abu Qir Bay near Alexandria. The objective of the operation was the defeat of the French expeditionary force that had remained in Egypt after Napoleon's return to France. Bad weather delayed disembarkation by a week but, on 8 March, Captain Alexander Cochrane of HMS Ajax gave the signal and deployed 320 boats, in double line abreast, to bring the troops ashore. French shore batteries opposed the landing, but the British were able to drive them back. During the landing Cameleon was anchored as near as possible with her broadside to the shore, and suffered one seaman wounded in the operation. By the next day, all of Sir Ralph Abercromby's British army was ashore. The British then defeated the French army at the Battle of Alexandria. The Siege of Alexandria followed, with the city falling on 2 September 1801. (Note: For three weeks General Count Charles Lallemand was a prisoner of war on board Cameleon. Maitland would meet him again in 1815 in connection with Napoleon's surrender.)

Because Cameleon served in the navy's Egyptian campaign between 8 March and 2 September 1801, her officers and crew qualified for the clasp "Egypt" to the Naval General Service Medal that the Admiralty issued in 1847 to all surviving claimants. (Note: A first-class share of the prize money awarded in April 1823 for the Egyptian campaign was worth £34 2s 4d; a fifth-class share, that of a seaman, was worth 3s 11½d. The amount was small as the total had to be shared between 79 vessels and the entire army contingent.)

Cameleon was among the nine vessels (one of them the Turkish vessel Zephyr), that shared in the proceeds of the capture on 29 June of the St Antonio di Padua.

In September Cameleon's cutter and jolly boat commanded by Lieutenant Richard Spencer and master's mate Charles Royer brought off from the beach near Tarragona a Spanish felucca mounting two 6-pounder guns and two swivel guns. The felluca was one of three that had run ashore at the approach of the boats. The British threw overboard the guns on the other two feluccas when small arms fire from soldiers on the beach prevented the British from getting the vessels.

On 15 May 1802, Keith promoted Lieutenant Thomas Staines to Commander and command of Cameleon in the Mediterranean. The appointment was confirmed on 24 July. During the short peace Cameleon maintained communications between Malta and Naples.

== Napoleonic Wars ==
On 28 June 1803 Cameleon joined Nelson off Toulon, who then sent her to Barcelona. Her ostensible mission was to buy bullocks for the fleet; actually Nelson tasked Staines with obtaining information on Spanish intentions vis-à-vis Britain. She returned to the Toulon blockade on 2 August. There she encountered Redbridge on 3 August; a French squadron of four frigates sortied that night and on the next day captured Redbridge and a transport that she was convoying.

Cameleon then returned to her old area of operation. There she captured nine merchantmen and also a French packet sailing from Corsica to Toulon. One of the merchant vessels was a polacre that Cameleon cut out from under the guns of batteries near Genoa in an action that cost her one man killed and seven wounded; enemy casualties amounted to four men killed and seven wounded.

Between 16 August 1803 and 25 March 1804, Cameleon captured St. Spiridion, St. Antonio di Padua, Madonna di Montinero, and Jeune Adelaide.

One 29 August, Cameleon's boats attempted to cut out five vessels sheltering under the protection of batteries at Rimasol. Cameleon had ten men wounded; she does not seem to have succeeded in capturing anything. On another occasion, Cameleon's boats, with those of Niger, succeeded in bringing out a settee from Alassio. This time too there were British casualties.

On 16 November Cameleon was part of Nelson's squadron off Corsica. Cameleon was lying nearly becalmed off Cap Corse, when Staines sighted an armed schooner escorting a transport. He deployed the boats, which succeeded in capturing the schooner, the French naval vessel Renard, of 12 guns. Stately went in chase of the transport, a brig, and captured her. French records report that Renard, under the command of lieutenant de vaisseau Jacques Constantin, was escorting a transport carrying troops from Calvi. The records attribute the capture to Cameleon and Victory, give a date of 25 November for the capture, and report that Renard surrendered after having been fired on over a period of hours by a ship and Cameleon. In his dispatches, Nelson simply attributed the capture to his squadron, though Victory's log in the Admiralty records Cameleon and Stately as the captors. Nelson described Renard as being armed with twelve 4-pounder guns and six swivel guns, and carrying a crew of 80 men. The transport brig was Titus, and she was taking 96 troops to Toulon. Stately then escorted both prizes to Malta. There the officers of the Malta Yard surveyed her; after she was found fit for service the navy commissioned her as Renard.

From November 1803 until August 1804 Cameleon patrolled the coast between Genoa and Marseilles. Off Marseilles she chased a large corvette and a brig back to their anchorage. During the cruise she captured 10 vessels, destroyed one at Port Maurice, assisted at the capture of three others, and brought off a raft of spars and timber from a beach at Hieres.

Nelson then permitted Staines to cruise the Adriatic. However, the three-month-long cruise left no record of any notable events.

From December 1804 to April 1805 Cameleon was employed protecting the Levant trade. In particular, she escorted a large convoy from the eastern Mediterranean to Gibraltar.

On 15 June 1805, while Cameleon was lying becalmed, a flotilla of Spanish gunboats approached. However, when Cameleon got out her sweeps and a breeze sprang up they withdrew.

Cameleon and Beagle then operated together under the command of Captain George Digby of Beagle. At one point Cameleon emerged unscathed after running a gantlet of fire from batteries as she was reconnoitering between the shore and Ascombrera Island (now Isla Escombreras, and connected to the shore). Then, off Carthagena, Cameleon sighted a garda-costa escorting six merchant vessels as they sailed eastward. The Spaniards were too well armed and were able to repel Cameleon's boats, causing losses of five men killed, wounded or missing. The missing either drowned in trying to board the garda-costa, or were captured after gaining her deck.

Cameleon's last adventure took place on 15 August. She was forced to throw carronades, shot and stores overboard to escape from a Spanish 74-gun ship. While Beagle sailed towards Cameleon to take her in tow, a breeze came up that aided the Spaniard. Just in time for Cameleon, the Spaniard and the two British vessels sighted four sail off to the south-west. The British made signals as if the four unknown vessels were British warships, leading the Spanish 74 to withdraw back to her anchorage, with Beagle and Cameleon in pursuit.

== Fate ==
Cameleon was paid off at Portsmouth in September 1805. The Commissioners of the Navy offered her for sale there on 20 September 1810. Cameleon was broken up at Portsmouth in April 1811.
