= Reynard (disambiguation) =

Reynard the Fox is a literary cycle of allegorical French, Dutch, English and German fables concerned with Reynard, an anthropomorphic red fox and trickster figure.

Reynard may also refer to:

- Reynard Motorsport, a former British race car chassis manufacturer
- HMS Reynard, or HMS Renard, ten ships of the Royal Navy
- Renard (Stravinsky), one-act opera by Igor Stravinsky (spelled either way)
- Renard, short for Reynardine, a fox-like character in webcomic Gunnerkrigg Court (often misspelled as Reynard)
- Reynard, a 1970s acid folk band from Liverpool

== Surname ==
- Reynard (surname)

== See also ==
- Renard (disambiguation)
- Reinhardt (disambiguation)
