= Rayner (surname) =

Rayner is a surname, and may refer to:

- Adam Rayner (born 1977), English actor
- Alan Rayner (born 1950), British biologist and educator
- Amy Rayner (born 1977), English football referee
- Angela Rayner (born 1980), British trade unionist and politician
- Ben Rayner, Canadian music journalist
- Bex Rayner (born 1999), English footballer
- Billy Rayner (1935–2006), Australian rugby footballer
- Cam Rayner (born 1999), Australian rules footballer
- Cameron Rayner (born 1999), Australian rules footballer
- Catherine Rayner (born 1982), British illustrator and writer of children's books
- Catherine Rayner (designer), British fashion designer
- Chessy Rayner (1931–1998), American interior decorator, socialite, fashion editor and writer
- Chloe Rayner (born 1996), Australian judoka
- Christine Rayner (1888–1973), British actress
- Chuck Rayner (1920–2002), Canadian ice hockey goaltender
- Claire Rayner (1931–2010), British journalist and agony aunt
- Dave Rayner (born 1982), American football placekicker
- Dave Rayner (cyclist) (1967–1994), English racing cyclist
- David Rayner (born 1982), New Zealand association footballer
- Derek Rayner, Baron Rayner (1926–1998), English businessman
- Denys Rayner (1908–1967), British Royal Navy officer, writer and designer of small boats
- Dominic Rayner (born 1983), New Zealand cricketer
- Dorothy Helen Rayner (1912–2003), British geologist
- Eddie Rayner (born 1952), New Zealand musician
- Edward Rayner (1932–2022), English footballer
- Elizabeth Rayner (1714–1800), British benefactress
- Ella-Mae Rayner (born 1995), English gymnast, fitness model and television personality
- Emmanuel Rayner (born 1958), British chess player
- Frank Rayner, English footballer
- George Rayner (1863–1915), New Zealand cricketer
- Gordon Rayner (1935–2010), Canadian abstract expressionist painter
- Harold Rayner (1888–1954), American fencer and modern pentathlete
- Henry Rayner (1902–1957), Australian and British artist
- Herbert Rayner (1911–1976), Canadian naval officer
- Howard Rayner (1896–1975), Australian cricketer, Australian rules footballer and anaesthetist
- Isidor Rayner (1850–1912), American politician from Maryland
- Jack Rayner (1921–2008), Australian rugby league footballer
- Jack Rayner (runner) (born 1955), Australian long-distance runner
- Jacqueline Rayner, British author and television writer
- Jay Rayner (born 1966), British journalist, writer and broadcaster
- Jimmy Rayner (1935–2009), English footballer
- Joan Rayner (1900–1999), New Zealand-born Australian theatre educator
- John Rayner (1924–2005), British rabbi
- John William Rayner (1897–1989), British soldier
- Julia Rayner, British actress
- Julian Rayner, New Zealand-British malaria researcher and academic
- Katharine Rayner (born 1944/5), American billionaire heiress
- Keith Rayner (bishop) (1929–2025), Australian Anglican archbishop
- Keith Rayner (psychologist) (1943–2015), American cognitive psychologist
- Kenneth Rayner (1808–1884), American lawyer and politician from North Carolina
- Lionel Benjamin Rayner (1788–1855), English actor
- Louise Rayner (1832–1924), British watercolour artist
- Luke Rayner, British guitarist and record producer
- Mabel Rayner (c.1890–1948), English botanist
- Margaret Rayner (1929–2019), British mathematician
- Mark A. Rayner, Canadian science fiction author
- Mark Alexander Rayner (born 1974), Australian stunt performer
- Michael Rayner (1932–2015), British opera singer
- Michael Rayner (architect), Australian architect and urban designer
- Michael Rayner (photographer) (born 1951), Australian press photographer and photojournalist
- Michael H. Rayner (1943–2004), Canadian accountant, Acting Auditor General of Canada
- Michele Rayner (born 1981), American attorney and politician
- Minnie Rayner (1869–1941), British stage and film actress
- Moira Rayner (born 1948), New Zealand-Australian barrister and human rights advocate
- Neil Rayner (born 1959), British tennis player
- Nicholas Rayner (1938–2017), British Army officer, jewellery expert and auctioneer
- Ollie Rayner (born 1985), English cricketer
- Oswald Rayner (1888–1961), British MI6 agent and journalist
- Paul Rayner (born 1959), English-New Zealand ceramicist
- Peter Alan Rayner (1924–2007), British coin-book author
- Ralph Rayner (1896–1977), British army officer and politician
- Ray Rayner (1919–2004), American television performer
- Richard Rayner (born 1955), British author
- Richard Piers Rayner, English comic book artist
- Rosalie Rayner (1898–1935), assistant and wife of psychologist John B. Watson
- Samuel Rayner (1806–1879), English landscape artist
- Sarah Rayner, British author
- Shannon Rayner (born 1984), Bermudian cricketer
- Shoo Rayner (born 1956), British children's author and illustrator
- Simon Rayner (born 1983), Canadian soccer goalkeeper
- Steve Rayner (1953–2020), British social scientist
- Sydney Rayner (1895–1981), American operatic tenor
- Thomas Crossley Rayner (1860–1914), British colonial judge, Chief Justice of British Guiana
- Walter Rayner (born 1882), British football player and manager
- Warren Rayner (born 1957), English footballer and coach
- William Rayner (1929–2006), English novelist

== See also ==
- Rayner (disambiguation)
- Rayner, lists people with the given name Rayner
- Rayne (surname)

Similar surnames, possibly of different etymologies
- "Rhine"/"ragin": Rain, Rainer, Rehner, Rein/Reinel/Reinelt/Reinl, Reindel/Reindl, Reincke/Reinke, Reinecke/Reineke/Reinicke, Reincken/Reinken, Reinier, Reinkens, Reinking, Reiner/Reiners, Reyner, Reyners
- Reginar, Régnier, Regnier
- "Reinhard": Reinert, Reynert
- "Runner": Renner, Rennert, Ronner, Rönner
- French: Rainier, Regnier, Régnier, Renier
- Other: Rayne, Rayner, Raynor, Renyer, Reyne
