= Renier =

Renier or Rénier is a masculine given and a surname which may refer to:

== Given name ==
- Renier Botha (born 1992), South African rugby union player
- Renier Coetzee (born 1961), South African Army brigadier general
- Renier de Huy (died c. 1150?), Belgian or Netherlandish metalworker and sculptor
- Renier of St Laurent (died 1188), Benedictine monk
- Renier I of Montferrat (1084–1135), ruler of the state of Montferrat in north-west Italy
- Renier of Montferrat (1162–1183), fifth son of William V of Montferrat and Judith of Babenberg
- Renier Schoeman (rugby union) (born 1983), South African rugby union player
- Renier of Trit, first Frankish duke of Philippopolis (modern Plovdiv, Bulgaria) from 1204 to 1205
- Renier van Tzum (1600–1670), merchant/trader and official of the Dutch East India Company
- Renier Vázquez Igarza (born 1979), Spanish chess player, Grand Master in 2007
- Renier Zen (died 1268), 45th doge of Venice

== Surname ==
- Alphonse Renier, Belgian football player who competed in the 1900 Olympic Games
- Ferdinand Renier (1906–?), Belgian weightlifter who competed in the 1928 Olympics
- Franck Rénier (born 1974), French professional road bicycle racer
- G. J. Renier (1892–1962), history professor
- Jérémie Renier (born 1981), Belgian actor
- Joseph Emile Renier (1887–1966) American sculptor, professor and medalist
- Marc Renier (born 1953), former Belgian racing cyclist
- Paolo Renier (1710–1789), Venetian statesman, the 119th, and penultimate, Doge of Venice
- Pascal Renier (born 1971), Belgian football defender
- Yannick Renier (born 1975), Belgian actor

== See also ==
- Renierite

Similar surnames, possibly of different etymologies
- "Rhine"/"ragin": Rain, Rainer, Rehner, Rein/Reinel/Reinelt/Reinl, Reindel/Reindl, Reincke/Reinke, Reinecke/Reineke/Reinicke, Reincken/Reinken, Reinier, Reinkens, Reinking, Reiner/Reiners, Reyner, Reyners
- Reginar, Régnier, Regnier
- "Reinhard": Reinert, Reynert
- "Runner": Renner, Rennert, Ronner, Rönner
- French: Rainier, Regnier, Régnier, Renier
- Other: Rayne, Rayner, Raynor, Renyer, Reyne
