= Renner (surname) =

Renner is a surname of Germanic origin. It began as an occupational surname for messengers from the Old English, Middle English, or Middle High German word rennan, meaning "runner" or "to run", or as a nickname with a similar origin. The surname has noted English, Dutch, and German origins, and can also be found in parts of France. It can also occur as a variant of the English surname Rayner and the German surname Reiner.

Notable people with the surname include:

== Academia ==
- János Renner (1889–1976), Hungarian physicist
- Johann Renner (c. 1525–1583), German notary and chronicler
- Magda Renner (1926–2016), Brazilian environmentalist
- Maximilian Renner (1919–1990), German zoologist and chronobiologist
- Natasha Goldowski Renner (1908–1966), Russian-born physicist
- Otto Renner (1883–1960), German plant geneticist
- Renato Renner (born 1974), Swiss professor
- Susanne Renner (born 1954), German botanist
- Theobald Renner (1779–1850), German anatomist and veterinarian
- W. Renner (c. 1846–1917), Sierra Leonean surgeon and cancer researcher
- Zsuzsanna Renner (born 1959), Hungarian historian

== Arts ==
- Benjamin Renner (born 1983), French cartoonist
- Carl Oskar Renner (1908–1997), German author
- Donald Renner (1926–2014), American artist
- Estela Renner, Brazilian director
- Guillermo Renner (1843–1924), French landscape designer
- Jack Gilbert Renner (1929–2017), American–German performer
- Jack Lee Renner (1935–2019), American musician and recording engineer
- James Renner, American writer
- Jeremy Renner (born 1971), American actor
- Johann August Renner (1783–?), German painter
- Joseph Renner Jr. (1868–1934), German composer
- Lois Renner (1961–2021), Austrian artist
- Narziß Renner (1502–1536), German painter
- Rebecca Renner, American author
- Ruth Maria Renner (born 1980), Romanian-German singer
- Thomas Jakob Renner (born 1970), German actor
- Valentin Renner (born 1998), German jazz musician

== Military ==
- Kurt Renner (1886–1943), German general
- Lothar Renner (1918–1991), German military officer
- Sigmund von Renner, Swiss-German military officer
- Theodor Renner (1865–1950), German general
- Wilhelm Renner (general) (1915–1982), German military officer

== Politics ==
- Andreas von Renner (1814–1898), Württemberger politician
- Antônio Jacob Renner (1884–1966), Brazilian politician
- Caspar Friedrich Renner (1692–1772), German jurist
- Elizabeth Renner (politician) (born 1946), Gambian politician
- Florian Renner (politician) (1870–1945), Austrian politician
- Friedrich Renner (1835–1907), German politician
- Friedrich Renner (politician, 1910) (1910–1985), German politician
- Gordon Renner (1900–1964), American politician
- Günter Renner (1939–2005), German judge
- Gusztáv Renner (1845–1905), Hungarian farmer and agriculturalist
- Hannelore Renner (1933–2001), first wife of German politician Helmut Kohl
- Heinz Renner (1892–1964), German politician
- Johann Anton Renner (1743–1800), Swiss politician
- John Henry Renner Osmeña (1935–2021), Philippine politician
- Joseph Aloys Renner (1810–1882), German judge and politician
- Joseph Friedrich Renner von Oesterreicher (1784–1865), Danish-Italian trader and diplomat
- Jürgen Renner (born 1966), German politician
- Karin Renner (born 1965), Austrian politician
- Karina Fissmann-Renner (born 1987), German politician
- Karl Renner (1870–1950), Austrian politician
- Luise Renner (1872–1963), first lady of Austria
- Margarete Renner (c. 1475–1475), German revolt organizer
- Martin Renner (born 1954), German politician
- Martin Renner (diplomat) (1870–1956), German-British diplomat
- Martina Renner (born 1967), German politician
- Moritz Renner (born 1981), German jurist
- Paul Marvin Renner (born 1967), American lawyer and politician
- Rob Renner (born 1954), Canadian politician
- Robert G. Renner (1923–2005), United States district judge
- Rudolf Renner (1894–1940), German politician
- Samuel Abraham von Renner (1776–1850), Swiss-German political figure
- Tari Renner, American politician
- Tim Renner (born 1964), German politician
- Viktor Renner (1899–1969), German politician
- Walter Renner (politician, 1940) (born 1940), Austrian politician
- Walter Renner (politician, 1946) (born 1946), Austrian politician

== Religion ==
- Elizabeth Renner (died 1826), Canadian-born missionary
- Louis Renner (1926–2015), American catholic academic
- Melchior Renner (1770–1821), German missionary
- Philipp Renner (died 1555), Austrian bishop

== Sports ==
- Anja Renner (born 1986), German paratriathlete
- Art Renner (1923–1999), American football player
- Bryn Renner (born 1990), American football player and coach
- Cornelia Renner, West German figure skater
- Dieter Renner (1949–1998), German soccer player and coach
- Frank Renner, West German sprint canoeist
- Hans Renner (ski jumper) (1919–1970), German ski jumper
- Herbert Renner (born 1946), German soccer player
- Ingeborg Renner (born 1946), German swimmer
- Ingo Renner (1940–2022), Australian glider pilot
- Jack Renner (golfer) (born 1956), American golfer
- Jim Renner (born 1983), American golfer
- Joseph Renner (1858–1916), New Zealand cricketer
- Max Renner (born 1992), German ice hockey player
- Peter Renner (born 1959), New Zealand track and field athlete
- René Renner (born 1993), Austrian soccer player
- Rich Renner (born c. 1974), American college football coach
- Robert Renner (athlete) (born 1994), Slovenian pole-vaulter
- Sara Renner (born 1976), Canadian cross-country skier
- Thomas Renner (born 1967), Austrian sprinter
- William Arthur Renner Jr. (born 1959), American football punter
- William Wilford Renner (1910–1969), American football quarterback
- Wolfgang Renner (born 1947), German cyclist

== Other ==
- Amalie Renner (1812–1884), iconic street peddler in Poland
- Charles Renner (wrestler), American pro wrestler known as Devon Moore
- Franz Renner (fl. 1470), early German printer
- Frederick Renner (1821–1893), German-Australian doctor
- Paul Friedrich August Renner (1878–1956), German typeface designer

== See also ==
- Lojas Renner, Brazilian department store clothing company
- Awoonor-Renner family, prominent Sierra Leone Creole family
- Raymond Desmond Aderemi Renner-Thomas, Chief Justice of Sierra Leone

Similar surnames, possibly of different etymologies
- "Rhine"/"ragin": Rain, Rainer, Rehner, Rein/Reinel/Reinelt/Reinl, Reindel/Reindl, Reincke/Reinke, Reinecke/Reineke/Reinicke, Reincken/Reinken, Reinier, Reinkens, Reinking, Reiner/Reiners, Reyner, Reyners
- Reginar, Régnier, Regnier
- "Reinhard": Reinert, Reynert
- "Runner": Renner, Rennert, Ronner, Rönner
- French: Rainier, Regnier, Régnier, Renier
- Other: Rayne, Rayner, Raynor, Renyer, Reyne
