= Reinicke =

Reinicke is a surname. Notable people with the surname include:

- Andreas Reinicke, German diplomat and currently the German Ambassador to Tunisia
- Hansjürgen Reinicke (1902–1978), Captain at sea, commander of heavy cruiser Prinz Eugen, in Nazi Germany's Kriegsmarine during the Second World War
- René Reinicke (1860–1926), German painter and illustrator
- Wulf Reinicke, East German retired slalom canoeist

== See also ==
- "Rhine"/"ragin": Rain, Rainer, Rein/Reinel/Reinelt/Reinl, Reindel/Reindl, Reincke/Reinke, Reinecke/Reineke/Reinicke, Reincken/Reinken, Reinkens, Reinking, Reiner/Reiners, Reyner, Reyners
- Reginar, Régnier, Regnier
- "Reinhard": Reinert, Reynert
- "Runner": Renner, Rennert, Ronner, Rönner
- Other: Rainier, Rayne, Rayner, Raynor, Reinier, Renyer, Reyne
