= Rayner =

Rayner is a given name and a surname. Notable people with the name include:

- Rayner (surname)

== Given name ==
- Rayner Blitz (born 1968), English cricketer
- Rayner Heppenstall (1911–1981), British novelist, poet, diarist, and BBC radio producer
- Rayner Hoff (1894–1937), British-born Australian sculptor
- Rayner Matthews (born 1971), American BMX racer
- Rayner Noble (born 1961), American baseball coach and player
- Rayner Stephens (1805–1879), English Methodist minister
- Rayner Unwin (1925–2000), English publisher

== Fictional characters ==
- Kyle Rayner, fictional comic-book character

== See also ==
- Rayne (disambiguation)

Similar surnames, possibly of different etymologies
- "Rhine"/"ragin": Rain, Rainer, Rehner, Rein/Reinel/Reinelt/Reinl, Reindel/Reindl, Reincke/Reinke, Reinecke/Reineke/Reinicke, Reincken/Reinken, Reinier, Reinkens, Reinking, Reiner/Reiners, Reyner, Reyners
- Reginar, Régnier, Regnier
- "Reinhard": Reinert, Reynert
- "Runner": Renner, Rennert, Ronner, Rönner
- French: Rainier, Regnier, Régnier, Renier
- Other: Rayne, Rayner, Raynor, Renyer, Reyne
