= Rainer (surname) =

Rainer is a German surname, a spelling variant of Reiner, also a common given name in Germany. People with the Rainer family name include:

- Adam Rainer (1899–1950), Austrian sufferer from dwarfism and gigantism
- Alfred Rainer (1987–2008), Austrian alpine skier
- Alois Rainer (born 1965), German politician
- Arnulf Rainer (1929–2025), Austrian painter
- Bryce Rainer (born 2005), American baseball player
- Dachine Rainer (1921–2000), American–English writer
- Eduard Rainer (1909–1936), Austrian mountaineer
- Francisc Rainer (1874–1944), Romanian pathologist, physiologist and anthropologist
- Friedrich Rainer (1903–1950), Austrian Nazi politician, Gauleiter and SS-Obergruppenführer
- Gerhard Rainer (born 1961), Austrian bobsledder
- Gottfried Rainer, Austrian photojournalist
- Hannes Rainer (1954–2020), Austrian sports shooter
- Karl Rainer (1901–1987), Austrian footballer and coach
- Luise Rainer (1910–2014), German-born actress
- Margrit Rainer (1914–1982), Swiss actress
- Maria-Luise Rainer (born 1959), Italian luger
- Marta Trancu-Rainer (1875–1950), Romanian surgeon
- Niklas Rainer (born 1983), Swedish alpine skier and coach
- Ove Rainer (1925–1987), Swedish jurist and politician
- Peter Rainer, German violinist
- Reinhold Rainer (born 1973), Italian luger
- Roland Rainer (1910–2004), Austrian architect
- Susanne Wasum-Rainer (born 1956), German diplomat
- Thom S. Rainer (born 1955), American executive and writer
- Wali Rainer (born 1977), American football player
- Yvonne Rainer (born 1934), American film director, choreographer and dancer

== See also ==
- Rainer (given name)
- Rainer (disambiguation)

Similar surnames, possibly of different etymologies
- "Rhine"/"ragin": Rain, Rainer, Rehner, Rein/Reinel/Reinelt/Reinl, Reindel/Reindl, Reincke/Reinke, Reinecke/Reineke/Reinicke, Reincken/Reinken, Reinier, Reinkens, Reinking, Reiner/Reiners, Reyner, Reyners
- Reginar, Régnier, Regnier
- "Reinhard": Reinert, Reynert
- "Runner": Renner, Rennert, Ronner, Rönner
- French: Rainier, Regnier, Régnier, Renier
- Other: Rayne, Rayner, Raynor, Renyer, Reyne
