= Reinken =

Reinken is a German surname derived from "Rein (given name)" with diminutive suffix '-ken'. Spelling variant: Reincken. Notable people with the surname include:

- Johann Adam Reincken, Dutch/German composer and organist
- Liselotte von Reinken, German art historian and biographer
- Lukas Reinken (born 1995), German politician
- Margarethe von Reinken, German painter

== Other ==
- "Rhine"/"ragin": Rain, Rainer, Rein/Reinel/Reinelt/Reinl, Reindel/Reindl, Reincke/Reinke, Reinecke/Reineke/Reinicke, Reincken/Reinken, Reinkens, Reinking, Reiner/Reiners, Reyner, Reyners
- Reginar, Régnier, Regnier
- "Reinhard": Reinert, Reynert
- "Runner": Renner, Rennert, Ronner, Rönner
- Other: Rainier, Rayne, Rayner, Raynor, Reinier, Renyer, Reyne
