= Raynor =

Raynor is an English surname that was brought to England after the Norman Conquest as French name Rainer, Reiner, Renier. The latter names originate from German dithematic names with stems ragin/regin ('council') and heri ('army'). Notable people with the name include:

== Surname ==
- Alex Raynor, American football player
- Angie Raynor (born 1967), American handball player
- Anna Raynor (born 1985), American javelin thrower
- Bruce S. Raynor, American labor union executive
- Eldon Raynor (1933–2022), Bermudian cricketer
- Gareth Raynor (born 1978), English rugby player
- Geoffrey Raynor (1913–1983), English metallurgist and university academic
- George Raynor (1907–1985), English footballer and football manager
- George Raynor (cricketer) (1852–1887), English clergyman, schoolmaster and cricketer
- George Raynor (pirate) (1665–1743), pirate active in the Indian Ocean
- Helen Raynor (born 1972), Welsh screenwriter and editor
- Henry Raynor (1917–1989), British musicologist and author
- Ian Raynor (born 1972), Bermudian swimmer
- Jaylen Raynor, American college football player
- John Raynor (born 1984), American baseball player
- John Patrick Raynor (1923–1997), American Catholic priest and university president
- Joseph B. Raynor Jr. (1923–2014), American politician
- Kenneth Raynor (1886–1973), English cricketer
- Kim Raynor, American football coach
- Michael A. Raynor (born 1962), American diplomat
- Michael E. Raynor (born 1967), Canadian writer and expert on business management practices
- Michael Raynor (actor), American actor, director and writer
- Molly Raynor (1905–1976), New Zealand and Australian actress
- Paul Raynor (born 1966), English football player and manager
- Paul Raynor (footballer, born 1957) (1957–2010), English footballer
- Scott Raynor (born 1978), American musician
- Seth Raynor (1874–1926), American golf course architect and engineer
- Sheila Raynor (1906–1998), British actress
- Sheridan Raynor (1934–2011), Bermudian cricketer
- Taylor Raynor (born 1983), American politician
- Timothy L. Raynor (born 1950), American actor and stuntman
- Vivien Raynor (1927–2009), American art writer
- William Raynor (1795–1860), English Victoria Cross recipient

== Given name ==
- Raynor Johnson (1901–1987), Australian parapsychologist, physicist and author
- Raynor Parkinson (born 1988), German rugby player
- Raynor Scheine (born 1942), American actor
- Raynor Taylor (1747–1825), American composer
- Raynor Winn (born 1962), English author

== Fictional characters ==
- Jim Raynor, fictional character in the StarCraft series and Heroes of the Storm

== See also ==
- Rainer (disambiguation)
- Rainier (disambiguation)
- Rayner (disambiguation)
- Reiner (disambiguation)

Similar surnames, possibly of different etymologies
- "Rhine"/"ragin": Rain, Rainer, Rehner, Rein/Reinel/Reinelt/Reinl, Reindel/Reindl, Reincke/Reinke, Reinecke/Reineke/Reinicke, Reincken/Reinken, Reinier, Reinkens, Reinking, Reiner/Reiners, Reyner, Reyners
- Reginar, Régnier, Regnier
- "Reinhard": Reinert, Reynert
- "Runner": Renner, Rennert, Ronner, Rönner
- French: Rainier, Regnier, Régnier, Renier
- Other: Rayne, Rayner, Raynor, Renyer, Reyne
