= Reindel =

Reindel is a German surname derived from the given name Rein with diminutive suffix -el and insert '-d-'. Notable people with the surname include:

- Carl Reindel (1935–2009), American actor
- Edna Reindel (1894–1990), American painter, printmaker, illustrator, sculptor, muralist and teacher
- Friedrich Reindel (1824–1908), Royal Prussian executioner

== See also ==
- Cahill Gordon & Reindel
- "Rhine"/"ragin": Rain, Rainer, Rein/Reinel/Reinelt/Reinl, Reindel/Reindl, Reincke/Reinke, Reinecke/Reineke/Reinicke, Reincken/Reinken, Reinkens, Reinking, Reiner/Reiners, Reyner, Reyners
- Reginar, Régnier, Regnier
- "Reinhard": Reinert, Reynert
- "Runner": Renner, Rennert, Ronner, Rönner
- Other: Rainier, Rayne, Rayner, Raynor, Reinier, Renyer, Reyne
