= Ronner =

Ronner is a surname. The German surname Rönner derives from any of occupations related to running Notable people with the surname include:

- Alfred Ronner (1851–1901), Belgian painter, graphic artist, and illustrator
- Alice Ronner (1857–1957), Belgian painter, sister of Alfred
- Ulf Rönner (born 1946), Swedish sprinter

== See also ==
- Henriëtte Ronner-Knip (1821–1909), Dutch-Belgian artist

Similar surnames, possibly of different etymologies
- "Rhine"/"ragin": Rain, Rainer, Rehner, Rein/Reinel/Reinelt/Reinl, Reindel/Reindl, Reincke/Reinke, Reinecke/Reineke/Reinicke, Reincken/Reinken, Reinier, Reinkens, Reinking, Reiner/Reiners, Reyner, Reyners
- Reginar, Régnier, Regnier
- "Reinhard": Reinert, Reynert
- "Runner": Renner, Rennert, Ronner, Rönner
- French: Rainier, Regnier, Régnier, Renier
- Other: Rayne, Rayner, Raynor, Renyer, Reyne
