= Reinecke =

Reinecke is a surname. Notable people with the name include

- Carl Reinecke (1824–1910), German composer, pianist and conductor
- Edwin Reinecke (1924– 2016), former Lieutenant Governor of California
- Hans-Peter Reinecke (1941–2005), German actor
- Hermann Reinecke (1888–1973), German general and war criminal
- Jost Reinecke (born 1957), sociologist
- Michael von Reinecke (1801–1859), Russian vice-admiral and hydrographer
- Paul Reinecke (1872–1958), German historian
- Tamina Reinecke (born 1995), German politician
- Zudie Harris Reinecke (1870–1924), American composer and pianist

== See also ==
- Reinecke's salt, a chemical compound
- "Rhine"/"ragin": Rain, Rainer, Rein/Reinel/Reinelt/Reinl, Reindel/Reindl, Reincke/Reinke, Reinecke/Reineke/Reinicke, Reincken/Reinken, Reinkens, Reinking, Reiner/Reiners, Reyner, Reyners
- Reginar, Régnier, Regnier
- "Reinhard": Reinert, Reynert
- "Runner": Renner, Rennert, Ronner, Rönner
- Other: Rainier, Rayne, Rayner, Raynor, Reinier, Renyer, Reyne
