= Rain (given name) =

Male given name

- Gender: Male; Female (in English)
- Name day: 1 October (Estonia)

Rain is a given name. People named Rain include:

== Given name ==
- Rain Newton-Smith (born 1975), Director General at the Confederation of British Industry
- Rain Chudori (born 1994), Indonesian writer, curator, screenwriter, artist and actress
- Rain Dove (born 1989), American model, actor and activist
- Rain Eensaar (born 1974), Estonian orienteer, rogainer and adventure racer
- Rain Epler (born 1977), Estonian politician
- Rain Graves (born 1974), American author of horror, fantasy, science fiction and poetry
- Rain Karlson (born 1992), Estonian boxer
- Rain Lee (born 1983), Hong Kong actress and singer
- Rain Ottis (born 1981), Estonian cybersecurity researcher and educator
- Rain Phoenix (born 1972), American actress, musician, and singer
- Rain Pryor, American actress and comedian
- Rain Raadik (born 1989), Estonian basketball player
- Rain Rannu (born 1980), Estonian screenwriter, movie director, investor and entrepreneur
- Rain Rosimannus (born 1968), Estonian politician and sociologist
- Rain Simmul (born 1965), Estonian actor
- Rain Spencer (born 1999), American actress
- Rain Sultanov (born 1965), Azerbaijani jazz saxophonist
- Rain Tolk (born 1977), Estonian actor
- Rain Veideman (born 1991), Estonian basketball player
- Rain Vessenberg (born 1975), Estonian footballer

== Mononym ==
- Rain (entertainer) (born 1982), South Korean pop artist and actor
- Rain (gamer) (born 1994), Norwegian Counter-Strike player
- Rain (wrestler) (born 1981), American wrestler
- Rain-in-the-Face (c.1835 – 1905), Native American warchief of the Lakota tribe

== Fictional Characters ==
- Rain (Mortal Kombat), a character in the Mortal Kombat fighting games
- Rain, a character in the Elfquest comic book series
- Rain, a horse in Spirit: Stallion of the Cimarron
- Rain, a character in Sword Art Online: Lost Song
- Rain Carradine, a character in the film Alien: Romulus
- Rain Hasumi, a character from Valkyrie Drive – Mermaid
- Rain Lao, a character in the film Independence Day: Resurgence
- Rain Mikamura, a character in Mobile Fighter G Gundam media
- Rain Ocampo, a character in the film Resident Evil
- Rain Robinson, a character from the Star Trek: Voyager episode "Future's End"

== See also ==
- Rainn Wilson (born 1966), American actor

Similar surnames, possibly of different etymologies
- "Rhine"/"ragin": Rain, Rainer, Rehner, Rein/Reinel/Reinelt/Reinl, Reindel/Reindl, Reincke/Reinke, Reinecke/Reineke/Reinicke, Reincken/Reinken, Reinier, Reinkens, Reinking, Reiner/Reiners, Reyner, Reyners
- Reginar, Régnier, Regnier
- "Reinhard": Reinert, Reynert
- "Runner": Renner, Rennert, Ronner, Rönner
- French: Rainier, Regnier, Régnier, Renier
- Other: Rayne, Rayner, Raynor, Renyer, Reyne
