= Reindl =

Reindl is a German surname derived from the given name Rein with diminutive suffix -l and insert '-d-'. Notable people with the surname include:

- Franziska Reindl (born 1982), German ice hockey player
- Franz Reindl (born 1954), German ice hockey player
- Ludovika Reindl, birth name of Lujza Blaha (1850-1926), Hungarian actress and singer
- Milos Reindl (1923–2002), Czech-Canadian artist and graphic designer
- Stefania Reindl (1922–1993), Polish artistic gymnast

== See also ==
- "Rhine"/"ragin": Rain, Rainer, Rein/Reinel/Reinelt/Reinl, Reindel/Reindl, Reincke/Reinke, Reinecke/Reineke/Reinicke, Reincken/Reinken, Reinkens, Reinking, Reiner/Reiners, Reyner, Reyners
- Reginar, Régnier, Regnier
- "Reinhard": Reinert, Reynert
- "Runner": Renner, Rennert, Ronner, Rönner
- Other: Rainier, Rayne, Rayner, Raynor, Reinier, Renyer, Reyne
