= Reinel =

Reinel is a German surname derived from the given name Rein with diminutive suffix -el. Notable people with the surname include:

- Gonzalo Gutiérrez Reinel (born 1955), Peruvian diplomat
- Jorge Reinel (c. 1502–after 1572), Portuguese cartographer and instructor in cartography, son of the well-known cartographer Pedro Reinel
- Pedro Reinel (c. 1462–c. 1542), Portuguese cartographer, author of one of the oldest signed Portuguese nautical charts

== See also ==
- "Rhine"/"ragin": Rain, Rainer, Rein/Reinel/Reinelt/Reinl, Reindel/Reindl, Reincke/Reinke, Reinecke/Reineke/Reinicke, Reincken/Reinken, Reinkens, Reinking, Reiner/Reiners, Reyner, Reyners
- Reginar, Régnier, Regnier
- "Reinhard": Reinert, Reynert
- "Runner": Renner, Rennert, Ronner, Rönner
- Other: Rainier, Rayne, Rayner, Raynor, Reinier, Renyer, Reyne
