= Reinking =

Reinking is a surname, and may refer to:

- Ann Reinking (1949–2020), American actress, dancer, and choreographer
- David Reinking, American literacy researcher
- Megan Reinking (born 1981), American stage and television actress
- Nate Reinking (born 1973), American-British basketball player and coach
- Travis Reinking (born 1989), American mass shooter

== See also ==
- Inking (disambiguation)
- "Rhine"/"ragin": Rain, Rainer, Rein/Reinel/Reinelt/Reinl, Reindel/Reindl, Reincke/Reinke, Reinecke/Reineke/Reinicke, Reincken/Reinken, Reinkens, Reinking, Reiner/Reiners, Reyner, Reyners
- Reginar, Régnier, Regnier
- "Reinhard": Reinert, Reynert
- "Runner": Renner, Rennert, Ronner, Rönner
- Other: Rainier, Rayne, Rayner, Raynor, Reinier, Renyer, Reyne
