= Reyners =

Reyners may refer to:

- Jelle Reyners (1600–1634), Dutch Golden Age painter
- Martin Reyners, New Zealand geophysicist and seismologist
- Reyners v Belgium, a 1974 EU law case concerning the free movement of services in the European Union

== See also ==
- "Rhine"/"ragin": Rain, Rainer, Rein/Reinel/Reinelt/Reinl, Reindel/Reindl, Reincke/Reinke, Reinecke/Reineke/Reinicke, Reincken/Reinken, Reinkens, Reinking, Reiner/Reiners, Reyner, Reyners
- Reginar, Régnier, Regnier
- "Reinhard": Reinert, Reynert
- "Runner": Renner, Rennert, Ronner, Rönner
- Other: Rainier, Rayne, Rayner, Raynor, Reinier, Renyer, Reyne
