= Rein (surname) =

Rein is a surname. Notable people with the surname include:

- Andrew Rein (born 1958), American wrestler
- Bo Rein (1945–1980), American baseball and football player
- David Rein (1914–1979), American attorney
- Hans Rein, German sprint canoeist
- Irving J. Rein, American communication scientist
- Ivan Rein (1905–1943), Croatian painter
- Johannes Justus Rein (1835–1918), German writer and traveler in East Asia
- Jeff Rein (born 1953), American businessman
- Jonas Rein (1760–1821), Norwegian priest, poet and politician
- Kristoffer Rein (1912–1993), Norwegian politician
- Manfred Rein (1948–2016), Austrian politician
- Mark Rein (journalist) (1909–1937?), Menshevik journalist
- Mark Rein (executive), vice president of Epic Games
- Mercedes Rein (1930–2006), Uruguayan writer and dramatist
- Ohad Rein (born 1979), Australian singer/songwriter, stage name Old Man River
- Paul Rein (born 1965), Swedish singer and songwriter
- Rosa Rein (1897–2010), German-Swiss supercentenarian
- Thérèse Rein (born 1958), Australian businesswoman
- Toomas Rein (born 1940), Estonian architect
- Torald Rein (born 1968), German cross country skier
- Torolf Rein (born 1934), Norwegian military officer
- Trine Rein (born 1970), Norwegian singer
- Wilhelm Rein (1847–1929), German educational theorist
- Yevgeny Rein (born 1935), Russian poet and writer

== See also ==
- Rein (given name)
- "Rhine"/"ragin": Rain, Rainer, Rein/Reinel/Reinelt/Reinl, Reindel/Reindl, Reincke/Reinke, Reinecke/Reineke, Reincken/Reinken, Reinkens, Reinking, Reiner/Reiners, Reyner, Reyners
- Reginar, Régnier, Regnier
- "Reinhard": Reinert, Reynert
- "Runner": Renner, Rennert, Ronner, Rönner
- Other: Rainier, Rayne, Rayner, Raynor, Reinier, Renyer, Reyne
