= Reineke =

Reineke is a surname. It may refer to:

- Bill Reineke (born 1954), member of the Ohio House of Representatives
- Blanche Reineke (1863–1935), American portrait photographer
- Chad Reineke (born 1982), American baseball pitcher
- Gary Reineke (1940–2024), American-Canadian actor
- Steven Reineke (born 1970), American musical composer and conductor
- Theresa M. Reineke (born 1972), American professor of chemistry

== See also ==
- "Rhine"/"ragin": Rain, Rainer, Rein/Reinel/Reinelt/Reinl, Reindel/Reindl, Reincke/Reinke, Reinecke/Reineke/Reinicke, Reincken/Reinken, Reinkens, Reinking, Reiner/Reiners, Reyner, Reyners
- Reginar, Régnier, Regnier
- "Reinhard": Reinert, Reynert
- "Runner": Renner, Rennert, Ronner, Rönner
- Other: Rainier, Rayne, Rayner, Raynor, Reinier, Renyer, Reyne
