= Reinelt =

Reinelt is a surname. Notable people with the surname include:

- Maximilian Reinelt (1988–2019), German rower and physician
- Robbie Reinelt (born 1974), English footballer
- Sascha Reinelt (born 1973), German field hockey player

== See also ==
- "Rhine"/"ragin": Rain, Rainer, Rein/Reinel/Reinelt/Reinl, Reindel/Reindl, Reincke/Reinke, Reinecke/Reineke, Reincken/Reinken, Reinkens, Reinking, Reiner/Reiners, Reyner, Reyners
- Reginar, Régnier, Regnier
- "Reinhard": Reinert, Reynert
- "Runner": Renner, Rennert, Ronner, Rönner
- Other: Rainier, Rayne, Rayner, Raynor, Reinier, Renyer, Reyne
