= Rainier (surname) =

Rainier is a surname, and may refer to:

- Alexandre de Rainier de Droue, Marquis de Boisseleau (1650–1698), French aristocrat and soldier
- John Harvey Rainier (1847–1915), Royal Navy Admiral
- John Spratt Rainier (1777–1822), English naval officer and politician
- Peter Rainier (Royal Navy officer, born 1741) (1741–1808), Royal Navy officer and politician
- Peter Rainier (Royal Navy officer, born 1784) (1784–1836), Royal Navy officer, nephew of the elder Peter Rainier
- Priaulx Rainier (1903–1986), South African-British composer

== See also ==
Similar surnames, possibly of different etymologies
- "Rhine"/"ragin": Rain, Rainer, Rehner, Rein/Reinel/Reinelt/Reinl, Reindel/Reindl, Reincke/Reinke, Reinecke/Reineke/Reinicke, Reincken/Reinken, Reinier, Reinkens, Reinking, Reiner/Reiners, Reyner, Reyners
- Reginar, Régnier, Regnier
- "Reinhard": Reinert, Reynert
- "Runner": Renner, Rennert, Ronner, Rönner
- French: Rainier, Regnier, Régnier, Renier
- Other: Rayne, Rayner, Raynor, Renyer, Reyne
