= Reinke =

Reinke is a surname. Notable people with the surname include:

- Andreas Reinke (born 1969), German footballer
- Andreas Reinke (rower) (born 1962), German rower
- Ernst Reinke (1891–1943), German politician
- Friedrich Berthold Reinke (1862–1919), German anatomist
- George Reinke (1914–2009), American politician
- Johannes Reinke (1849–1931), German botanist and philosopher
- Judy Rising Reinke, American diplomat
- Mitch Reinke (born 1996), American ice hockey defenseman
- Ramona Reinke, German swimmer
- Russell Reinke (1921–2004), Canadian businessman and politician
- Ruth Reinke Whitney (1928–1999), American magazine editor
- Steve Reinke (born 1963), Canadian video artist and filmmaker
- Steve Reinke (speedway rider) (born 1949), Australian motorcycle speedway rider

== See also ==
- "Rhine"/"ragin": Rain, Rainer, Rein/Reinel/Reinelt/Reinl, Reindel/Reindl, Reincke/Reinke, Reinecke/Reineke, Reincken/Reinken, Reinkens, Reinking, Reiner/Reiners, Reyner, Reyners
- Reginar, Régnier, Regnier
- "Reinhard": Reinert, Reynert
- "Runner": Renner, Rennert, Ronner, Rönner
- Other: Rainier, Rayne, Rayner, Raynor, Reinier, Renyer, Reyne
