= Reiners =

Reiners is a surname. Notable people with the name include:

- Portia Reiners (born 1990), American actress
- Jamal Reiners (born 1998), Australian footballer
- Joca Reiners Terron (born 1968), Brazilian poet, novelist, designer and editor
- William A. Reiners (born 1937), American ecologist

== See also ==
- "Rhine"/"ragin": Rain, Rainer, Rein/Reinel/Reinelt/Reinl, Reindel/Reindl, Reincke/Reinke, Reinecke/Reineke/Reinicke, Reincken/Reinken, Reinkens, Reinking, Reiner/Reiners, Reyner, Reyners
- Reginar, Régnier, Regnier
- "Reinhard": Reinert, Reynert
- "Runner": Renner, Rennert, Ronner, Rönner
- Other: Rainier, Rayne, Rayner, Raynor, Reinier, Renyer, Reyne
