= Reyner =

Reyner is a surname, and has also been used as a given name. Notable people with the name include:

- Reyner Banham (1922–1988), English architectural critic
- Clement Reyner (1589–1651), English Benedictine monk
- Edward Reyner (1600–c.1668), English nonconforming clergyman
- Harry Reyner (1889–1978), American politician, mayor of Newport News, Virginia

== See also ==
Similar surnames, possibly of different etymologies
- "Rhine"/"ragin": Rain, Rainer, Rehner, Rein/Reinel/Reinelt/Reinl, Reindel/Reindl, Reincke/Reinke, Reinecke/Reineke/Reinicke, Reincken/Reinken, Reinier, Reinkens, Reinking, Reiner/Reiners, Reyner, Reyners
- Reginar, Régnier, Regnier
- "Reinhard": Reinert, Reynert
- "Runner": Renner, Rennert, Ronner, Rönner
- French: Rainier, Regnier, Régnier, Renier
- Other: Rayne, Rayner, Raynor, Renyer, Reyne
