= Reiner (surname) =

Reiner is a surname. Notable people with this surname include:

- Alysia Reiner (born 1970), American actress
- Annie Reiner (born 1949), American author, playwright, poet, and singer
- Beatrice Simcox Reiner (1905–1996), American psychiatric social worker
- Carl Reiner (1922–2020), American film director, screenwriter, actor and father of Rob Reiner
- Charles Reiner (1924–2006), Hungarian-Canadian pianist and music educator
- Charles Reiner (cricketer) (1884–1947), English cricketer
- Constantin Reiner (born 1997), Austrian footballer
- Daniel Reiner (born 1941), French politician
- Erica Reiner (1924–2005), American Assyriologist and author
- Estelle Reiner (1914–2008), American actress and singer
- Franz Reiner (1912–?), Swiss sprint canoer
- Fritz Reiner (1888–1963), Hungarian conductor
- Gary M. Reiner (born c. 1954), American businessman
- Grete Reiner (1885–1944), Czech-German magazine editor and writer
- Heinrich Reiner (1892–1946), German Nazi Party official and politician
- Herbert Reiner Jr. (1916–1999), American diplomat
- Ira Reiner (born 1936), American lawyer and politician
- Irving Reiner (1924–1986), American mathematician
- Jared Reiner (born 1982), American professional basketball player
- Jeffrey Reiner, American film director
- John Reiner (born 1956), American cartoonist
- Julie Reiner (born 1973/1974), American mixologist, club owner, and author
- Karel Reiner (1910–1979), Czech composer and pianist
- Keani Reiner (1952–1994), Hawaiian surfer and sailor
- Kenneth Reiner (1916–2011), American industrialist, philanthropist and inventor
- Lucas Reiner (born 1960), American painter, printmaker, photographer, filmmaker and son of Carl Reiner
- Luke Reiner, American politician
- Markus Reiner (1886–1976), Israeli engineer and scientist, one of the founders of rheology
- Maxine Reiner (1916–2003), American actress
- Michele Singer Reiner (1957–2025), American filmmaker and photographer
- Nancy Reiner (1942–2006), American artist
- Rob Reiner (1947–2025), American film director, screenwriter, actor and son of Carl Reiner
- Robert Reiner (businessman) (1880–1960), American machinist, entrepreneur and businessman
- Robert Reiner (scholar) (born 1946), British sociologist and criminologist
- Tracy Reiner (born 1964), American actress
- Vincentio Reiner (Renieri, Reinieri) (1606–1647), Italian astronomer and mathematician
- Wenzel Lorenz Reiner (1689–1743), Baroque painter
- William Reiner, American urologist and psychiatrist
- Željko Reiner (born 1953), Croatian physician, politician, and university professor

== Other ==
Similar surnames, possibly of different etymologies
- "Rhine"/"ragin": Rain, Rainer, Rehner, Rein/Reinel/Reinelt/Reinl, Reindel/Reindl, Reincke/Reinke, Reinecke/Reineke/Reinicke, Reincken/Reinken, Reinier, Reinkens, Reinking, Reiner/Reiners, Reyner, Reyners
- Reginar, Régnier, Regnier
- "Reinhard": Reinert, Reynert
- "Runner": Renner, Rennert, Ronner, Rönner
- French: Rainier, Regnier, Régnier, Renier
- Other: Rayne, Rayner, Raynor, Renyer, Reyne
