= Rennert =

Rennert is a German surname, a variant of Renner, named after a profession or a nickname related to running, or a variant of Reinert, after a given name. Notable people with the surname include:

- Dutch Rennert (1930–2018), American baseball umpire
- Günther Rennert (1911–1978), German opera director and administrator
- Ira Rennert (born 1934), American businessman
- Peter Rennert (born 1958), American tennis player
- Wolfgang Rennert (1922–2012), German opera conductor

== Other ==
- Rennert, North Carolina, town in the US

Similar surnames, possibly of different etymologies
- "Rhine"/"ragin": Rain, Rainer, Rein/Reinel/Reinelt/Reinl, Reindel/Reindl, Reincke/Reinke, Reinecke/Reineke/Reinicke, Reincken/Reinken, Reinkens, Reinking, Reiner/Reiners, Reyner, Reyners
- Reginar, Régnier, Regnier
- "Reinhard": Reinert, Reynert
- "Runner": Renner, Rennert, Ronner, Rönner
- Other: Rainier, Rayne, Rayner, Raynor, Reinier, Renyer, Reyne
