= Rainier =

Rainier may refer to:

== Places ==
=== United States ===
- Rainier, Oregon, a city
- Rainier, Washington, a city
- Mount Rainier, Washington, a stratovolcano
- Rainier National Forest, Washington, a former national forest
- Rainier Mesa, Nevada, a nuclear test region

=== Canada ===
- Rainier, Alberta, a hamlet

== Sports ==
- Seattle Rainiers, a defunct minor league baseball team in Seattle, Washington, US
- Tacoma Rainiers, a minor league baseball team of the Pacific Coast League, US

== Science and technology ==
- Visual Studio .NET (pre-release codename: Rainier), by Microsoft
- Rainier, a test nuclear blast, part of Operation Plumbbob
- Project Rainier, an Amazon Web Services AI supercomputer
- Rainier cherry, a cultivar of cherry

== Transportation ==
- Buick Rainier, a car
- Rainier (Link station), a light rail station in Seattle, US
- Rainier Motor Car Company, an American automobile manufacturer from 1905 to 1911

=== Ships ===
- USS Rainier, several US Navy ships
- HMS Admiral Rainier (1800), a Dutch brig captured and renamed by the British
- NOAAS Rainier, a US hydrographic survey ship

== Other uses ==
- Rainier (name), a list of people and fictional characters with the given name or surname
- Rainier Brewing Company, based in Washington, US
- Rainier Club, a private club in Seattle, Washington, US
- Rainier High School (disambiguation), several high schools in the US

== See also ==
- Mount Rainier (disambiguation)
- Rainier Beach, Seattle, a city neighborhood
- Rainier Valley, Seattle, a city neighborhood
- Rainer (disambiguation)
- Rayner (disambiguation)
- Rainerius (c. 1115/1117–1160), patron saint of Pisa
- Raynor, an English surname
- Reiner (disambiguation)
- Reyner, a surname and a given name
- Rainier Fog, a 2018 studio album by American rock band Alice In Chains
