= Renner =

Renner may refer to:

- Renner (surname)
- Renner, Dallas, Texas
- Renner, Indiana
- Renner, South Dakota
- Lojas Renner, a Brazilian department stores clothing company

== Other ==
- Reiner, Rennert
