= Regnier =

Régnier or Regnier is a French given name, personal name and surname, and may refer to:

== Surname ==
- Regnier (surname)
- Régnier

== Personal name ==
- Regnier I, Count of Hainaut (850–915), son of Gislebert, Count of Darnau and Ermengarde of Lorraine
- Regnier II, Count of Hainault (born 890), son of Regnier I, Count of Hainaut and Hersent of France
- Regnier III, Count of Hainaut (circa 920–973), son of Regnier II, Count of Hainaut
- Regnier de Graaf (1641–1673), Dutch physician and anatomist
- Rainerius, patron saint of Pisa

== Other ==
- Régnier Motor Company, an aircraft engine manufacturer founded by Émile Régnier

== See also ==
- Rainer (disambiguation)
- Reginar
- Reinier
- Reynier (disambiguation)
