= Reiner =

Reiner may refer to:

- Reiner (crater), a crater on the Moon, named after Vincentio Reiner
- Reiner Township, Pennington County, Minnesota

== People ==
- Reiner (given name)
- Reiner (surname)

== Fictional characters ==
- Reiner Braun (Attack on Titan), a character in the manga series Attack on Titan

== See also ==
- Rainer (disambiguation)
- Rainier (disambiguation)
- Rayner (disambiguation)
- Raynor
- Reiners
- Reyner
