= Rainer (given name) =

German male given name

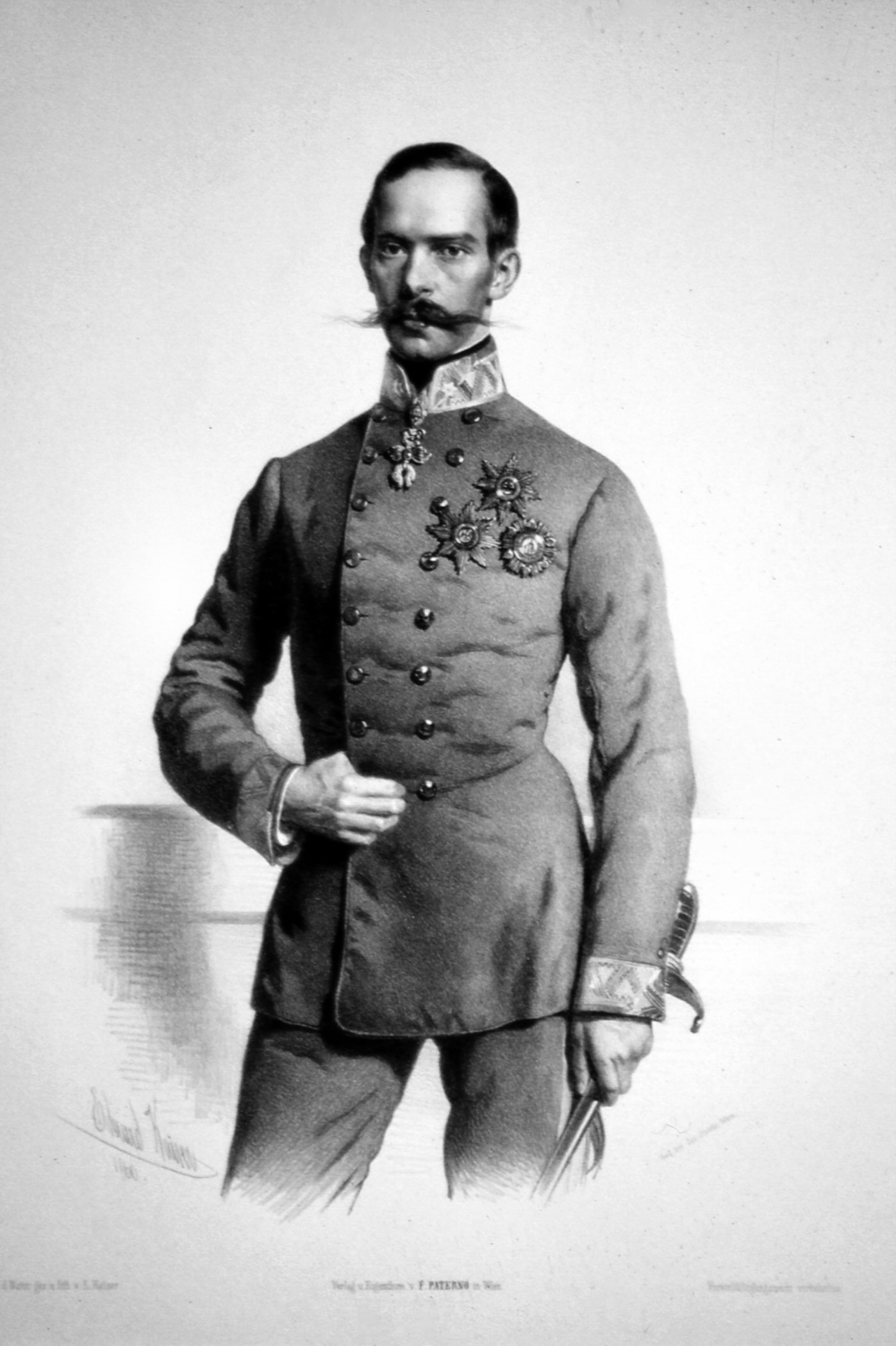
Archduke Rainer Ferdinand of Austria, Austrian prime minister

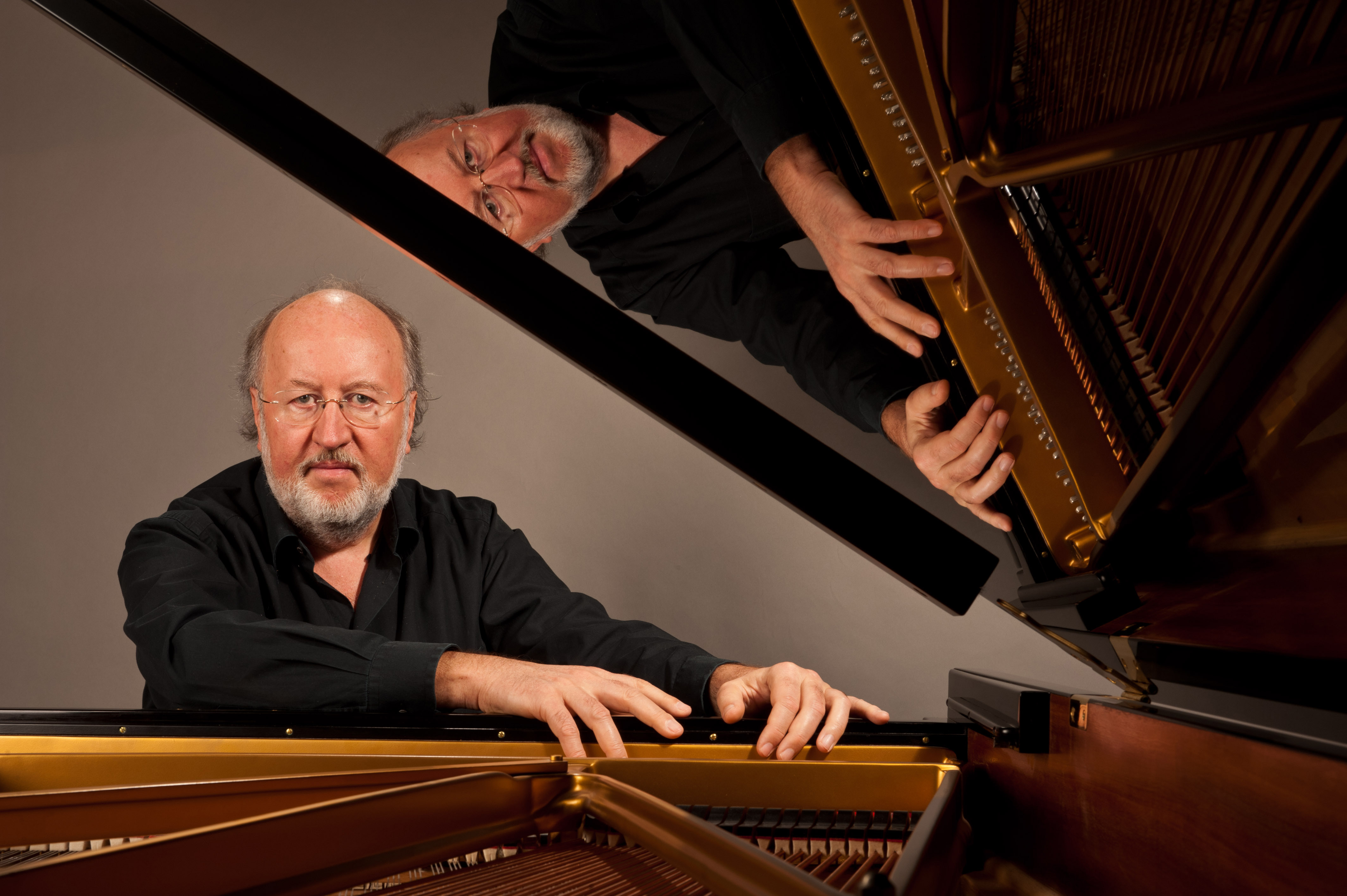
Rainer Brüninghaus, German jazz musician

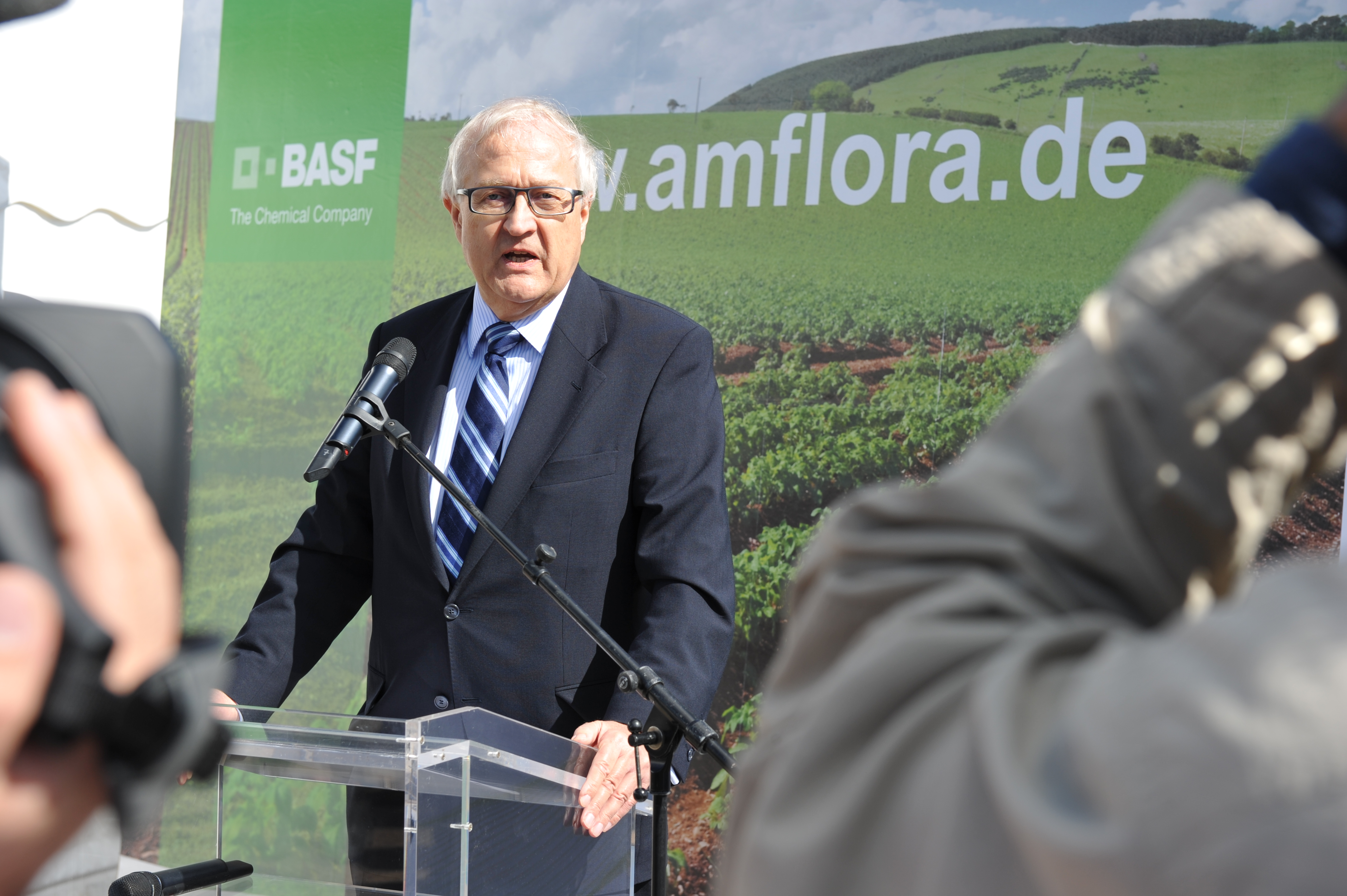
Rainer Brüderle, German politician

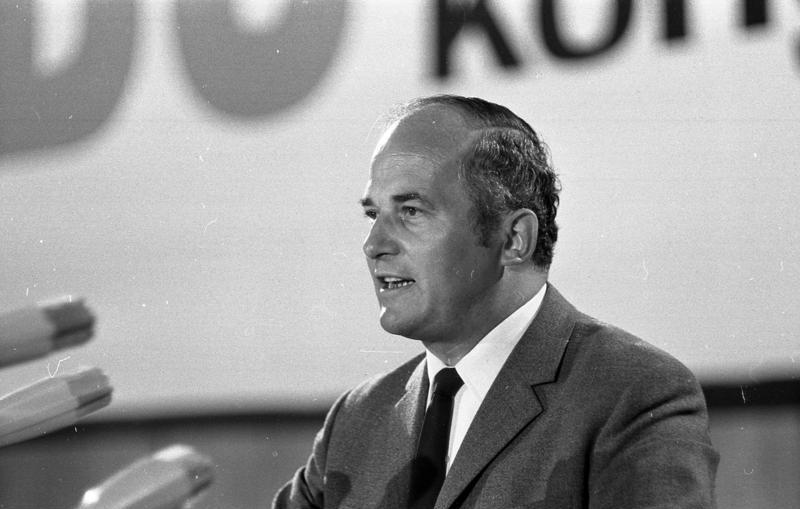
Rainer Barzel, German politician

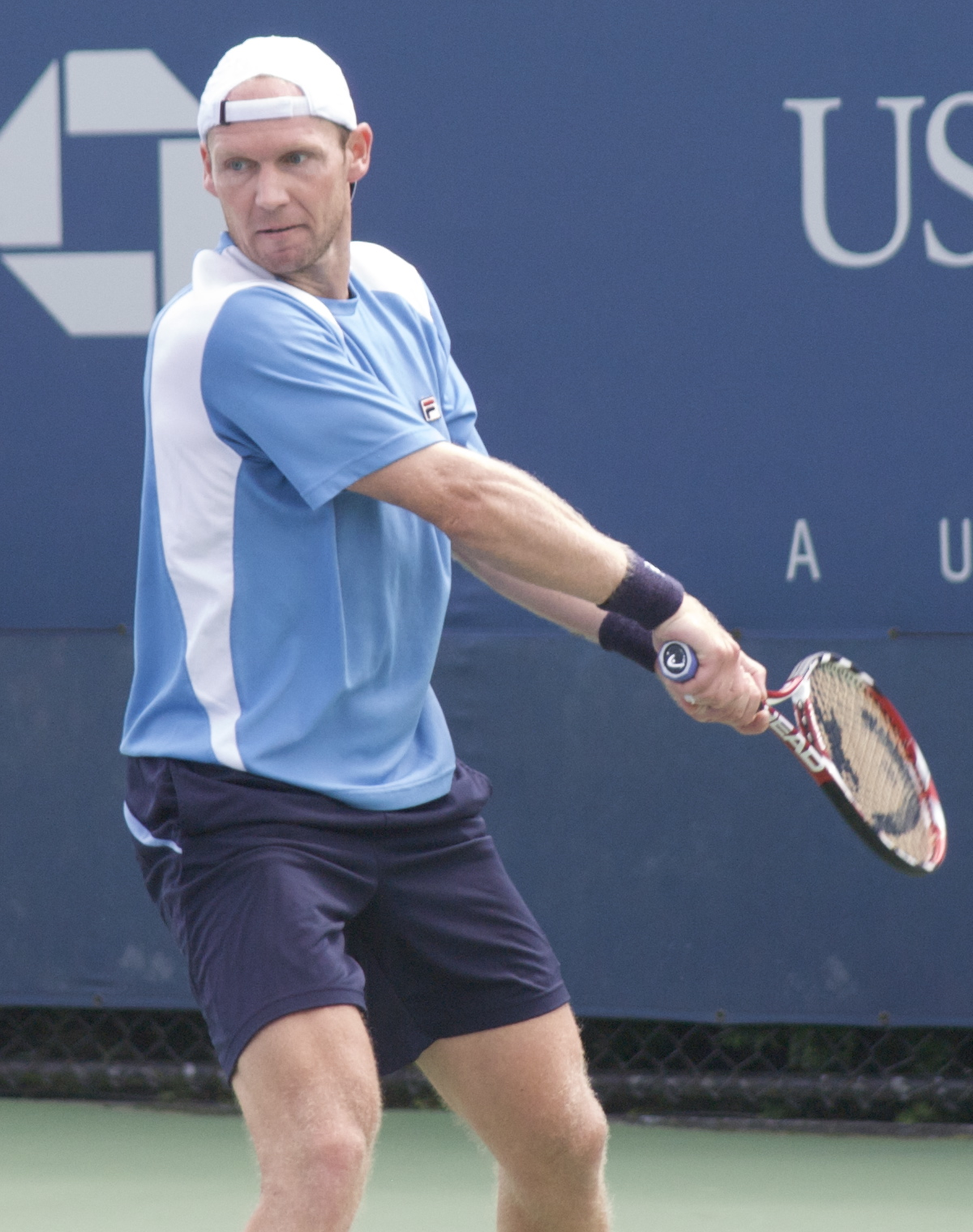
Rainer Schüttler, German tennis player

Rainer (pronounced [ˈʁaɪnɐ]) is a German male given name.

== Notable people ==
Notable people with this name include:

=== Musicians ===
- Rainer Bloss (1946–2015), German electronic musician
- Rainer Brüninghaus (born 1949), German jazz musician
- Rainer Nygård (born 1972), Finnish guitarist (Diablo)
- Rainer Ptacek (1951–1997), American guitarist

=== Nobility ===
- Archduke Rainer Ferdinand of Austria (1827–1913), Austrian prime minister
- Archduke Rainer Joseph of Austria (1783–1853), Austrian viceroy of the kingdom of Lombardy-Venetia
- Archduke Rainer of Austria (1895–1930), Austrian prince imperial
- Prince Rainer of Saxe-Coburg and Gotha (1900–1945), German prince

=== Sportspeople ===
- Rainer Adrion (born 1953), German footballer and manager
- Rainer Aigner (born 1967), German former footballer
- Rainer Åkerfelt (born 1934), Finnish sprint canoer
- Rainer Bonhof (born 1952), German footballer
- Rainer Eitzinger (born 1983), Austrian tennis player
- Rainer Forss (1930–2005), Finnish footballer
- Rainer Nicot (born 1954), German footballer
- Rainer Ohlhauser (born 1941), German footballer
- Rainer Osselmann (born 1960), German water polo player
- Rainer Philipp (born 1950), German ice hockey player
- Rainer Schönfelder (born 1977), Austrian skier
- Rainer Schüttler (born 1976), German tennis player
- Rainer Torres (born 1980), Peruvian footballer
- Rainer Zobel (born 1948), German footballer

=== Other ===
- Rainer Arnold (born 1950), German politician
- Rainer Barzel (1924–2006), German politician
- Rainer Brüderle (born 1945), German politician
- Rainer Ludwig Claisen (1851–1930), German chemist
- Rainer Werner Fassbinder (1945–1982), German film director
- Rainer Fetting (born 1949), German painter and sculptor
- Rainer von Fieandt (1890–1972), Finnish banker and politician
- Rainer Frimmel (born 1971), Austrian film director and photographer
- Rainer Froese (born 1950), German marine ecologist
- Rainer Lagemann (born 1959), German sculptor and photographer
- Rainer Langhans (June 1940), German writer and filmmaker
- Rainer Maria Latzke (born 1950), German artist
- Rainer Lemström (1931–2007), Finnish politician
- M. Rainer Lepsius (1928–2014), German sociologist
- Rainer Liedtke (1943–2012), German physician, scientist and entrepreneur
- Rainer Mahlamäki (born 1956), Finnish architect
- Rainer Masera (born 1944), Italian academic and economist
- Rainer Moormann (born 1950), German chemist and nuclear whistleblower
- Rainer Neske (born 1964), German banker and business executive
- Rainer Nõlvak (born 1966), Estonian entrepreneur and environmentalist
- Rainer Offergeld (born 1937), German politician
- Rainer Ortleb (born 1944), German academic and politician
- Rainer Maria Rilke (1875–1926), Bohemian-Austrian poet and novelist
- Rainer Sarnet (born 1969), Estonian film director
- Rainer Vakra (born 1981), Estonian politician
- Rainer Weiss (1932–2025), German-American Nobel Prize laureate in Physics
- Rainer Wimmer (born 1955), Austrian politician
- Rainer Woelki (born 1956), German Cardinal of the Catholic Church
- Rainer Zitelmann (born 1957), German historian

== See also ==
- Rainer (surname)
- Rainer (disambiguation)
- Rainier (name)
- Raynor (surname)
- Reina (given name)
