= Haljand =

Haljand is both a given name and a surname. Notable people with the name include:

- Haljand Udam (1936–2005), Estonian orientalist
- Rein Haljand (born 1945), Estonian swimmer
- Tõnu Haljand (1945–1997), Estonian skier
