= Reynier =

Reynier may refer to:

== People ==
- Reynier (given name), Dutch masculine given name
- Franck Reynier (born 1965), French politician
- Jean Reynier (1771–1814), French general
- Léon Reynier (1833–1895), French virtuoso violinist

== Places ==
- Reynier, former commune in south eastern France
- Reynier Village, Los Angeles

== See also ==
- Rainer (disambiguation)
- Reginar
- Regnier (disambiguation)
