= Mount Rainier (disambiguation) =

Mount Rainier is a stratovolcano southeast of Seattle, Washington.

Mount Rainier may also refer to:

- Mount Rainier (train), a former Amtrak train
- Mount Rainier, Maryland, a town in the United States
- Mount Rainier High School, a school in Des Moines, Washington
- Mount Rainier (packet writing), a technology for reading and writing CD-RWs, similar to the Universal Disk Format

== See also ==
- Mount Rainier National Park
- Mount Rainier Forest Reserve
- Rainier (disambiguation)
