= Geschichten aus der Heimat =

- Country of origin: Germany

Original release
- Release: 31 December 1983

Geschichten aus der Heimat is a German television series. It was released in West Germany on 31 December 1983. It was released in color, as was norm. It won a Golden Camera award in 1991, and best German actor was Heinz Reincke.

== Production Companies ==
- Hessischer Rundfunk (HR)
- Norddeutscher Rundfunk (NDR)
- Saarländischer Rundfunk (SR)
- Sender Freies Berlin (SFB)
- Westdeutscher Rundfunk (WDR)

== See also ==
- List of German television series
