= Rainier (name) =

The name Rainier (/rəˈnɪər/ or /reɪˈnɪər/; French: [ʁɛnje], a French form of Rainer) may refer to:

== Given name ==
- Reginar II, Count of Hainaut (890–932), also written Rainier II
- Rainier, Margrave of Tuscany, Margrave of Tuscany from 1014 to 1027
- Rainier, Marquess of Montferrat (c. 1084–1135)
- Rainerius (c. 1115/1117–1160), also spelled Rainier, patron saint of Pisa and travelers
- Rainier I of Monaco, Lord of Cagnes (1267–1314)
- Rainier II, Lord of Monaco (1350–1407)
- Rainier III, Prince of Monaco (1923–2005)

== Surname ==
- Rainier (surname)

== Fiction ==
- Charles Rainier, main character in the novel Random Harvest by James Hilton
- Rainier Wolfcastle, an action hero star in The Simpsons episodes and comics

== See also ==
- Rainer (disambiguation)
