= Liselotte von Reinken =

German historian (1911–2005)

- Born: 9 August 1911; Bremen, German Empire
- Died: 18 August 2005 (aged 94); Bremen, Germany
- Occupation: Historian

Academic work
- Institutions: Radio Bremen

Liselotte von Reinken (9 August 1911 – 18 August 2005) was a German historian, biographer of Wilhelm Groener and Paula Modersohn-Becker. She also worked at Radio Bremen for 19 years.

== Career ==
Liselotte von Reinken was born in Bremen. Her grandfather was Daniel von Reinken (1831-1894). Her parents were Hans von Reinken and Carola von Reinken (1884-1983).

Reinken studied with Fritz Kern. She worked until 1936 on the English Minister of War Haldane. From 4 October 1937 she began recording the memoir of the Nazi Interior Minister Wilhelm Groener. Groener gave her his diaries from 1914 to 1918. Reinken made excerpts from this material, which she submitted to Groener weekly. She ended her work for Groener's memoirs on 29 March 1939.

After 1945, Reinken became cultural editor at Radio Bremen, where she remained for 19 years.

== Works and publications ==
- Kunsthalle Bremen (Hg.), Günter Busch, Liselotte von Reinken: Margarethe von Reinken. 18771962. Gemälde, Aquarelle, Zeichnungen. Ausstellungskatalog, Bremen 1994.
- Paula Modersohn-Becker mit Selbstzeugnissen and Bilddokumenten. Rowohlt Taschenbuch, Reinbek 1983. ISBN 3-499-50317-4
- Günter Busch, Liselotte von Reinken: Paula Modersohn-Becker in Briefen und Tagebüchern. Fischer, Frankfurt (1979). ISBN 3-10-050601-4
- Rundfunk in Bremen 1924–1974, Bremen 1975.
- Deutsche Zeitungen über Königin Christine 1626-1689: eine erste Bestandsaufnahme, in: Band 6 von Studien zur Publizistik. Bremer Reihe. Deutsche Presseforschung, Verlag Fahle, Bremen 1966.
- Bertha von Suttner: Memoiren, Verlag C. Schünemann, Bremen 1965.
- Wilhelm Groener: Lebenserinnerungen: Jugend-Generalstab-Weltkrieg. Hg. von Friedrich Frhr. Hiller von Gaertringen. Band 41 von Deutsche Geschichtsquellen des 19. und 20. Jahrhunderts. Verlag Vandenhoeck und Ruprecht, Göttingen 1957.
- Haldane: Umriss eines liberalen Imperialisten, Kohlhammer Verlag, Stuttgart 1937.
- Haldane: Beiträge zur Geschichte der nachbismarckischen Zeit und des Weltkriegs, Kohlhammer Verlag, Stuttgart 1937.
