= Tamina Reinecke =

German politician (born 1995)

Member of the Landtag of Lower Saxony
- Incumbent
- Assumed office 11 December 2024
- Preceded by: Meta Janssen-Kucz

Personal details
- Born: 1995 (age 30–31) Salzgitter
- Party: Alliance 90/The Greens (since 2020)

Tamina Reinecke (born 1995 in Salzgitter) is a German politician serving as a member of the Landtag of Lower Saxony since 2024. From 2021 to 2024, she served as research assistant to Frank Bsirske.
