= Lance Regnier =

Australian rules footballer (1919–1982)

Personal information
- Full name: Lancelot Robert Regnier
- Born: 17 July 1919; Hawthorn, Victoria
- Died: 30 July 1982 (aged 63); Piangil, Victoria
- Original team: Sandringham
- Height: 193 cm (6 ft 4 in)
- Weight: 83 kg (183 lb)

Playing career^{1}
Years	Club	Games (Goals)
1939–1940	St Kilda	10 (11)
1941	Carlton	7 (2)
Total		17 (13)
- ^{1} Playing statistics correct to the end of 1941.

Lancelot Robert Regnier (17 July 1919 – 30 July 1982) was an Australian rules footballer who played with Carlton and St Kilda in the Victorian Football League (VFL).

== Family ==
The son of Richard Rudolph Regnier (1892-1960), and Janet Regnier (1894-1984), née Mounsey, Lancelot Robert Regnier was born at Hawthorn, Victoria on 17 July 1919.

He married Lorna Good (1925-1996) in 1948.

== Football ==
=== Sandringham (VFA) ===
On 15 June 1938 he was granted a permit to play with Sandringham in the VFA.

=== St Kilda (VFL) ===
He was cleared from Sandringham to St Kilda on 27 July 1939.

=== Carlton (VFL) ===
He was cleared from St Kilda to Carlton on 23 April 1941.

=== Sandringham (VFA) ===
He played another four matches for Sandringham in 1947; the first against Coburg on 19 July 1947. After receiving a broken nose in the 16 August 1947 match against Brunswick, he retired.

== Military service ==
Regnier served in the Australian Army during World War II.

== Death ==
He died at Piangil, Victoria on 30 July 1982.
