= Inking =

Inking may refer to:

- Inking (attack), act of throwing ink on other person
- Inking, a defensive activity of certain cephalopods and sea hares
- Inking (comic book production)
- Pen computing, a computer input method using a stylus
- A real-time computer graphics technique of outlining the edges of a model

== See also ==
- Ink (disambiguation)
