= USS Rainier =

There have been three ships with the name USS Rainier that saw service in the United States Navy:

- USS Rainier (1917), a schooner in commission as a patrol vessel from 1917 to 1919
- USS Rainier (AE-5), an ammunition ship in commission from 1941 to 1946 and from 1951 to 1970
- USS Rainier (AOE-7), a fast combat support ship commissioned in 1995, decommissioned in 2003, and transferred to the Military Sealift Command as USNS Rainier (T-AOE-7).

== See also ==
- NOAAS Rainier is an oceanographic survey ship operated by the National Oceanic and Atmospheric Administration. She was launched in 1967.
- SS Rainier (T2-SE-A1) a World War II commercial T2 tanker completed on 24 March 1944, by Swan Island. After World War II she was sold to a private company in 1948. Converted to bulker cargo ship in 1962. Was wrecked and lost in 1965.
- USNS Rainier (YT-808), a harbor tug and lead ship of the Rainier class of tugboats
