= Rein Willems =

Dutch businessman

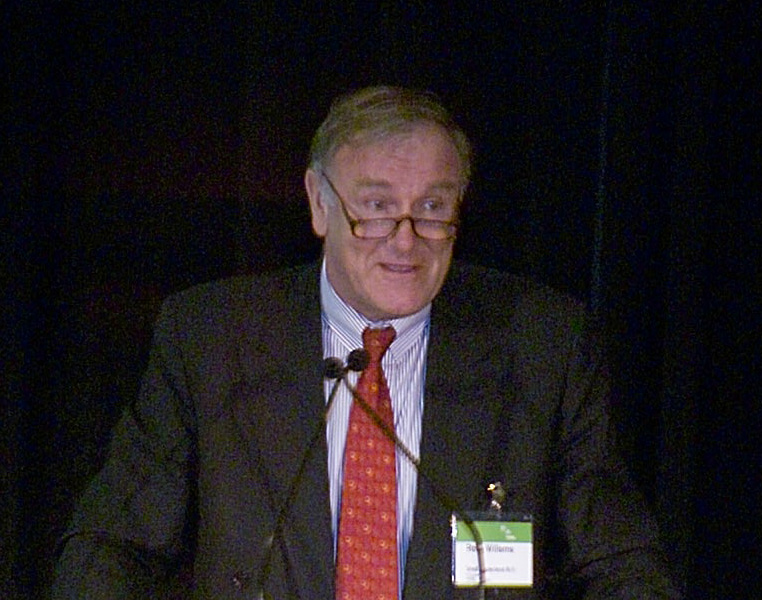
- Born: 26 August 1945; Geleen, Netherlands
- Education: Delft Technical University
- Scientific career
- Fields: Petrochemistry
- Workplaces: Shell Nederland

Rein Willems (born 26 August 1945, in Geleen) was President of Shell Nederland from 2003 to 2007. Since 1969, he has held a number of positions at Shell, with postings in Singapore, Australia, the UK, the Philippines and Brazil. In addition, he was a member of the Executive Committee and the Environmental Committee of the Employers Association VNO-NCW and the Innovation Platform. He is Chairman of the Supervisory Board of Koninklijke Joh. Enschedé, member of the Supervisory Board of the Vrije Universiteit Amsterdam, the Centraal Orgaan Opvang Asielzoekers (COA) and the Van Leeuwen Pipe and Tube Group B.V. He was Chairman of the national Task Force Energy Transition, which was established to make the Dutch economy more sustainable. He is a member of the supervisory board of FMO, the Dutch development bank.
