= Rebecca Renner =

American writer

- Born: Gainesville, Florida
- Education: Stetson University
- Occupations: Author; Journalist
- Website: rebecca-renner.com

Rebecca Renner (born Gainesville, Florida) is an American author, journalist, and non-fiction writer.

== Early life and education ==
Renner grew up in Central Florida, where she first spotted a wild adult alligator near her home at the age of seven, an experience that sparked a lifelong fascination with reptiles, especially alligators. She graduated from Stetson University with an MFA in fiction writing.

== Career ==
In 2017, while teaching high school in her hometown, she overheard a student mention Operation Alligator Thief. That moment led her to one of the central stories in her book Gator Country. In 2019, Renner returned to Stetson as an adjunct instructor in creative writing.

Her work has appeared in National Geographic, The New York Times, Outside Magazine, Electric Lit, and Orlando Weekly. She spoke at a Key West Literary Seminar.

Gator Country is about wildlife conservation. It’s a narrative nonfiction account of a wildlife officer who goes undercover to root out a poaching ring in the Florida Everglades. The book also provides historical information about early conservation efforts, legislation regulating gator hunting, and descriptions of markets for alligator. Gator Country was the 2024 Great Read from Florida with Library of Congress Center for the Book and Editor's Choice/Staff Pick from The New York Times Book Review.

== Works ==
- Renner, Rebecca (2023-11-14). Gator Country. ISBN 978-1-250-84257-2.
