= George Raynor (cricketer) =

English clergyman, schoolmaster, and cricketer

George Sydney Raynor (9 October 1852 – 1 September 1887) was an English clergyman, a schoolmaster and a cricketer who played in first-class cricket matches for Cambridge University in 1872 and 1873. He was born at Sandsend, Lythe, North Yorkshire and died at West Wickham, Kent.

Raynor was educated at Brentwood Grammar School, from where he won a scholarship to Winchester College, and at St John's College, Cambridge. At Winchester, he was a right-handed middle-order batsman and a right-arm fast bowler, but at Cambridge he batted very low in the batting order. The 37 not out that he made in the match against Surrey in 1872 constituted more than half of his total first-class runs and was made from No 11 in the batting line-up. In the previous match, he had taken five wickets in the second innings of the Gentlemen of England game for 44 runs, and this was the best bowling performance of his first-class career. He was picked for the 1872 University Match against Oxford University, but was not successful, failing to take a wicket. In 1873, he played only a single match, again with little success, and was not selected again.

Raynor graduated from Cambridge University with a Bachelor of Arts degree in 1875 and took up a post as an assistant master at Repton School; he was ordained as a Church of England priest in 1877. From 1881 to 1886 he was headmaster of Kensington Foundation School and for the last year of his life was headmaster of the Royal Naval Academy at Gosport.
