= Rainier High School =

Rainier High School may refer to one of these U.S. high schools:

- Rainier High School (Oregon), a school in Rainier, Oregon
- Rainier High School (Washington), a school in Rainier, Washington

It may also refer to:

- Mount Rainier High School, Des Moines, Washington
- Rainier Beach High School (Seattle, Washington)
