= Ingeborg Renner =

German swimmer

Personal information
- Born: 2 August 1946 (age 79) Erfurt, Germany

Sport
- Sport: Swimming

Ingeborg Renner (born 2 August 1946) is a German former swimmer. She competed in two events at the 1968 Summer Olympics.
