= Sarah Rayner =

British author

Sarah Rayner is a British author who grew up in Richmond. She lives in Brighton and worked as an advertising copywriter before writing fiction full-time.

Rayner's break-out novel was her third, One Moment, One Morning, about a death on a train and the effect it has on three women.

== Books ==
=== Fiction ===
- The Other Half, Orion Publishing Group, 2001 (Revised edition 2013 by Picador)
- Getting Even, Orion Publishing Group, 2002 (Revised edition 2013 by Picador)
- One Moment, One Morning, Picador, 2010 (US publication 2011 by St. Martin's Press)
- The Two Week Wait, Picador, 2012 (US Publication 2012 by St. Martin's Press)
- Another Night, Another Day, Picador, 2014 (US Publication 2014 by St. Martin's Press)

=== Nonfiction ===
- Making Friends with Anxiety, self-published e-book, 2014
