= Beatrice Simcox Reiner =

American social worker

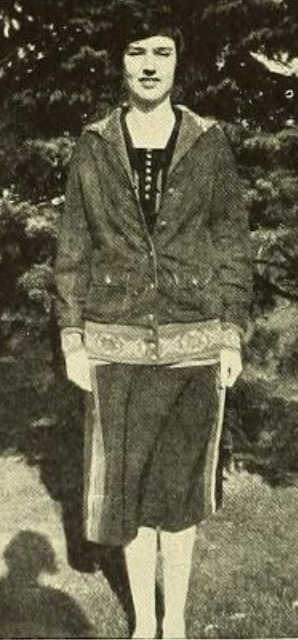
- Beatrice Simcox (later Reiner), from the 1927 yearbook of Bryn Mawr College
- Born: Beatrice Robinson Simcox; April 18, 1905; Philadelphia, Pennsylvania
- Died: February 10, 1996 (aged 95); St. Petersburg, Florida
- Occupation(s): Social worker, college instructor

Beatrice Simcox Reiner (April 18, 1905 – February 10, 1996) was an American psychiatric social worker, who specialized in addressing the causes of juvenile delinquency, teen pregnancy, and related issues.

== Early life and education ==
Beatrice Robinson Simcox was born in Philadelphia, the daughter of Lawrence Simcox and Beatrice G. Cunningham Simcox. Her father was a medical doctor. She graduated from Germantown Friends School in 1923, and from Bryn Mawr College in 1927. She earned a master's degree in social work at the New York School of Social Work in 1937.

== Career ==
Reiner was a caseworker for the Community Service Society of New York from 1931 to 1944, in New York, at the Family Service Association of Greater Boston from 1944 to 1958. She worked at the Judge Baker Guidance Center from 1954 to 1958, and as a marriage and family counselor at the Juvenile Welfare Board in Pinellas County, Florida from 1961 to 1966.

In addition to her clinical work, Reiner taught social work classes at Simmons College and at Boston University School of Social Work in the mid-1940s. In her sixties, she went to Ethiopia to teach at the Haile Sellassie I University School of Social Work from 1966 to 1969. In 1980, she was a keynote speaker at the annual meeting of the Maryland chapter of the National Association of Social Workers.

While in Boston, she worked with psychiatrist Irving Kaufman on writing about juvenile delinquency in several research papers and two books. She wrote further professional papers with her colleagues in Florida.

== Publications ==
- The Social Service Exchange (1947)
- "Diagnostic Process in Marital Problems" (1947)
- "Handling of Early Contacts with Parents of Delinquents" (1956, with Irving Kaufman)
- "Treatment of Character Disorders in Parents of Delinquents" (1956, with Irving Kaufman)
- Casework with Parents of Delinquents (1956, with Irving Kaufman)
- Character Disorders in Parents of Delinquents (1959, with Irving Kaufman)
- "Some meanings of identity for casework" (1961)
- "Casework Treatment of Sexual Confusion in Character Disorders" (1962)
- "Group Counseling with Unmarried Mothers" (1965, with George H. Finck and Brady O. Smith)
- "Conflict in marriage following premarital pregnancy" (1966, with George H. Finck, Nenebelle G. Dame, Ruth G. Mayos, and B. O. Smith)
- "The Real World of the Teenage Negro Mother" (1968)
- "Project Playpen: Primary Prevention" (1972, with George H. Finck and William E. Neet)
- "A Feeling of Irrelevance: The Effects of a Nonsupportive Society" (1979)
- "Resolving Agency Conflicts" (1982)

== Personal life ==
Simcox married architect Jan Reiner in the mid-1950s. She died at her home in St. Petersburg, Florida, in 1996, at the age of 90. There is a container of Reiner's papers in the Sophia Smith Collection at Smith College.
