= Lojas Renner =

Brazilian department store chain

Lojas Renner S.A.
- Type: publicly traded company
- Traded as: B3: LREN3; Ibovespa Component
- Industry: Department store
- Founded: 1912
- Founder: Antonio Jacob Renner
- Headquarters: Porto Alegre, Brazil
- Products: Clothing
- Revenue: ▲US$ 2.1 billion (2019)
- Net income: ▲US$ 272.0 million (2019)
- Number of employees: 26.000

Lojas Renner S.A. is Brazil's leading fashion and lifestyle retailer founted in 1922, originally part of the manufacturing AJ Renner Group, founded by Antonio Jacob Renner. The company separated from the group in 1965, when is stores started to take on a different format, closer to their current model.

As Brazil's largest fashion retailer, Lojas Renner has been present in the e-commerce market since 2010. Currently active in different markets, its brands consist on Renner (fashion and lifestyle retail), Camicado (home furnishings and decor), Youcom (youth-oriented fashion), Ashua (curve and plus-size women's fashion), and Realize CFI (consumer credit and financial services).

As of today, the company runs more than 700 stores, considering 438 Renner stores, including 10 in Uruguay and 4 in Argentina, 123 Camicado stores, 114 Youcom stores, and 13 Ashua stores.

== History ==
A.J. Renner Group

The entire Renner family lived in São Sebastião do Caí, a city located 60 km from the capital of Rio Grande do Sul, a southern state in Brazil. Years later, after moving to Porto Alegre, the family decided to invest in manufacturing and opened a factory in the Navegantes neighborhood, producing men's capes made of pure wool.

Renner then began to expand and diversify its business activities through flax plantations, which originated linen used to manufacture men's garments. This initiative inspired the company's first well-known slogan: "Renner: good clothing, stitch by stitch."

In 1922, the company opened its first retail store connected directly to the factory products in Porto Alegre. Over time, it evolved into a department store model, adding sections for small home appliances, variety goods and gift items, furniture, household products, sporting goods, and bed, bath, and table linens. In 1945, the company opened its first official department store: Otávio Rocha Store, located in an important street in the city.

Independence from the A.J. Renner Group

In 1965, driven by the growth of Lojas Renner, the A.J. Renner Group decided to separate the different companies that were part of the conglomerate. On that occasion, Lojas Renner was formally established as an independent company, consolidating its position in Brazil’s fashion retail sector.

Two years later, in 1967, Renner became a publicly traded company. In 1990, Lojas Renner underwent a major restructuring process, adopting the a fashion-focused department store format, further strengthening its position in the fashion retail market. During this period, the company also introduced its Enchanting Philosophy ("Filosofia de Encantamento"), according to which it is not enough to satisfy customers, but rather to exceed their expectations.

During the same decade, Renner expanded its operations beyond Rio Grande do Sul, into the states of Santa Catarina, Paraná, São Paulo, Rio de Janeiro, Minas Gerais, and the Federal District.

In 1991, when the restructuring process began, the company ran 8 stores. By November 1998, Lojas Renner had 21 active stores, with 13 additional locations.

The expansion process began in 1994 with the opening of stores in the state of Santa Catarina. In 1996, Renner inaugurated its first store in the state of Paraná, followed in 1997 by the opening of its first stores in the state of São Paulo.

=== J.C. Penney ===
In December 1998, J.C. Penney Brazil, a subsidiary of one of the largest department store chains in the United States, acquired the controlling interest in Lojas Renner S.A.,facilitating access to international suppliers, specialized consulting for commercial site selection, as well as elevated patterns for procedures and internal controls.

As a result, Lojas Renner S.A. accelerated its expansion process by opening more than 30 stores throughout Brazil's South, Southeast, and Central-West regions.

With the implementation of the lifestyle concept in its collections and stores in 2002, collections began to be developed around different lifestyles and composed of private-label brands that reflected customers' attitudes, interests, values, personalities, and habits. Stores also started displaying products in a coordinated manner. This initiative helped strengthen Lojas Renner S.A.'s position in the Brazilian fashion retail market.

In June 2005, when the company already operated 64 stores, JCPenney, along with the management of Lojas Renner S.A., chose to sell its controlling stake through a public offering of shares on the B3 stock exchange.

Lojas Renner S.A. subsequently achieved a highly dispersed ownership structure, with approximately 100% of its shares in free float, becoming recognized as Brazil's first corporation with no controlling shareholder.

As part of the same process, the company joined B3's Novo Mercado, an exclusive segment for companies that are in line with enhanced corporate governance standards. This corporate structure contributed to the company's growth and later supported its expansion into a fashion retail holding company.

Enchanting Culture

Lojas Renner S.A. embraces the concept of “Enchanting Culture” as part of its customer experience strategy. According to the company's institutional materials, this approach places the customer at the center of decision-making and encourages personalized and proactive service practices. The concept is also associated with corporate values such as customer focus, valuing people, performance, sustainability, and leadership.

Internally, this strategy is reflected in people management practices and training programs designed to promote cultural alignment and strengthen customer experience and service. Retail industry experts note that customer experience initiatives have been widely adopted across the sector as a means of achieving competitive edge.

Business Ecosystem and Brands

Lojas Renner S.A. strategy consists on forming an ecosystem of proprietary fashion brands and complementary businesses, designed to serve different consumer profiles and usage occasions. This model is based on a lifestyle-based segmentation approach, supported by the development and management of proprietary brands.

The company's main brands and business operations include:

- Renner, a fashion and lifestyle retailer;
- Camicado, a home furnishings and home décor retailer;
- Youcom, a youth-oriented fashion brand;
- Ashua, a women's curve and plus-size fashion brand; and
- Realize CFI, a consumer credit and financial services company.

The company runs an omnichannel system, integrating physical stores, e-commerce, and digital platforms. Lojas Renner's e-commerce operation plays a significant role in its growth strategy, supported by integrated logistics and inventory management. The company has also expanded internationally, with operations in countries such as Uruguay and Argentina, through both physical stores and digital presence.

International Expansion

In 2017, the company took another important step by inaugurating its first international operation. Today, it operates 10 stores in Uruguay and, since 2019, four stores in Argentina. The company also maintains offices in China, Bangladesh and Vietnam. Altogether, Renner operates 672 stores across its business units.

Operations and International Presence

Lojas Renner S.A. operates throughout Brazil, with a network of physical stores distributed across different regions of the country, supported by an integrated digital presence, as reported in its corporate disclosures. Internationally, the company maintains operations in South America, particularly in Uruguay and Argentina, through physical stores and initiatives that support its omnichannel business model.

Its operations are organized into two main segments:

• Retail, encompassing apparel, accessories, cosmetics, and home products

• Financial Services, through Realize CFI, which offers credit and financial products

The company's operating model is based on the integration of physical and digital channels, combined with a diversified portfolio of brands and services.

Sustainability and Social Responsibility

Lojas Renner S.A. develops initiatives related to sustainable fashion, including actions aimed at reducing environmental impacts and strengthening the production chain, as described in its sustainability reports.

These initiatives are in line with the adoption of ESG practices in retail, and environmental, social, and governance considerations into the company's operations, as well as public commitments related to emissions reduction and circularity. Focus-areas include:

• Usage of certified raw materials, such as certified, traceable, and responsibly sourced cotton;

• Development of products with lower environmental impact;

• Implementation of operations and stores that follow energetic standards for efficiency and environmental certifications;

• Integration of socio-environmental criteria into operations and throughout its supply chain.

The company's social initiatives are carried out mainly through Lojas Renner Institute, which focuses on social impact and income generation and supports projects related to productive inclusion and the development of the textile value chain. The Institute also promotes women's entrepreneurship and income generation through projects that have already benefited hundreds of thousands of people across Brazil.

=== Lojas Renner Institute ===
Lojas Renner Institute is a Civil Society Organization of Public Interest (Oscip) created in 2008 as an entity that manages the private social investment of Lojas Renner S.A. It has the mission of promoting the insertion of women in the labor market, supporting entrepreneurial social actions developed by civil society organizations that would contribute effectively to the qualification and inclusion of women and the development of the communities where the company operates.

== See also ==
- JCPenney
