= Rein Haljand =

Estonian swimmer, sport personnel, and sport pedagogue

Personal information
- Born: May 12, 1945 (age 81) Tallinn, then part of Estonian SSR, Soviet Union

Sport
- Sport: Swimming

Rein Haljand (born 12 May 1945 in Tallinn) is an Estonian swimmer, sport personnel and sport pedagogue.

In 1966 he graduated from Tallinn Pedagogical Institute in physical education.

1962-1967 he become 6-times Estonian champion in different swimming disciplines. 1960-1968 he was a member of Estonian national swimming team and competed in backstroke and freestyle.

1989-2016 he was a member of Estonian Olympic Committee; 1997-2000 its general secretary, 2000-2001 its vice-president.

1992-1996 he was the president of Estonian Swimming Federation.

Since 1966 he is teaching at Tallinn Pedagogical Institute.

== Awards ==
- 2010: Order of the White Star, IV class.
