= Rainer =

Rainer may refer to:

== People ==
- Rainer (surname)
- Rainer (given name)

== Other ==
- Rainer Island, an island in Franz Josef Land, Russia
- 16802 Rainer, an asteroid
- Rainer Foundation, British charitable organisation

== See also ==
- Rainier (disambiguation)
- Rayner (disambiguation)
- Raynor
- Reiner (disambiguation)
- Reyner
