= Rainerius =

Patron saint of Pisa, Italy

Saint Rainerius
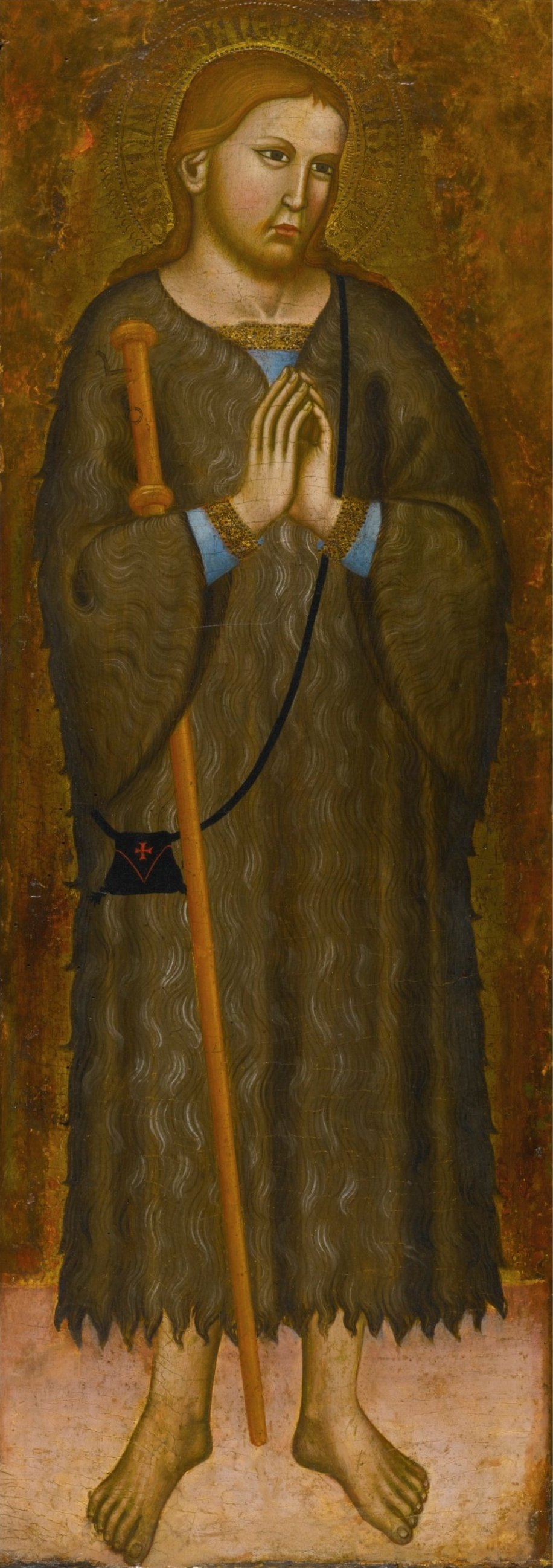
- Saint Rainerius by Cecco di Pietro
- Born: c. 1115/1117
- Died: c. 1160; Pisa, Italy
- Venerated in: Catholic Church
- Major shrine: Duomo di Pisa
- Feast: 17 June
- Attributes: depicted as a bearded hermit in a hairshirt holding a rosary; as a young pilgrim in a hairshirt carrying a banner with the Pisan cross; as being raised up by devils; or as dying in a hairshirt.
- Patronage: Pisa; travellers

Rainerius (c. 1115/1117 – 1160) is the patron saint of Pisa and patron saint of travellers. His feast day is 17 June, and his name may also be spelt Raynerius, Rainerius, Rainier, Raineri, Rainieri, Ranieri, Raniero, or Regnier.

== Life ==
Rainerius was the son of Gandulfo Scacceri, a prosperous merchant and shipowner of Pisa, and Mingarda Buzzaccherini. In his youth, he was a travelling musician. Later biographies stress his worldliness at this stage. He met, through his travels, a holy man, Alberto, a nobleman from Corsica "who wore a cloak of animal hair, like a goat", and had entered the monastery of Saint Vitus (San Vito) in Pisa and become renowned for his work for the poor. Rainerius was so impressed that he became a devout Christian.

In 1146, Rainerius set himself up as a merchant in order to pay for his fare to the Holy Land. The business took him to many ports, and he became wealthy through trade with the sailors. His travels took him to the Holy Land, where, it is said, he had a vision by which he understood that his wealth was hindering him from devoting himself to God. He resolved to give up his wealth and live in complete poverty. He remained in the Holy Land for seven years, living as a beggar and visited the holy shrines (the Holy Sepulchre, Mount Tabor, Hebron, Bethlehem). His austerity was so excessive, his later biographer noted, that God had to tell him to eat.

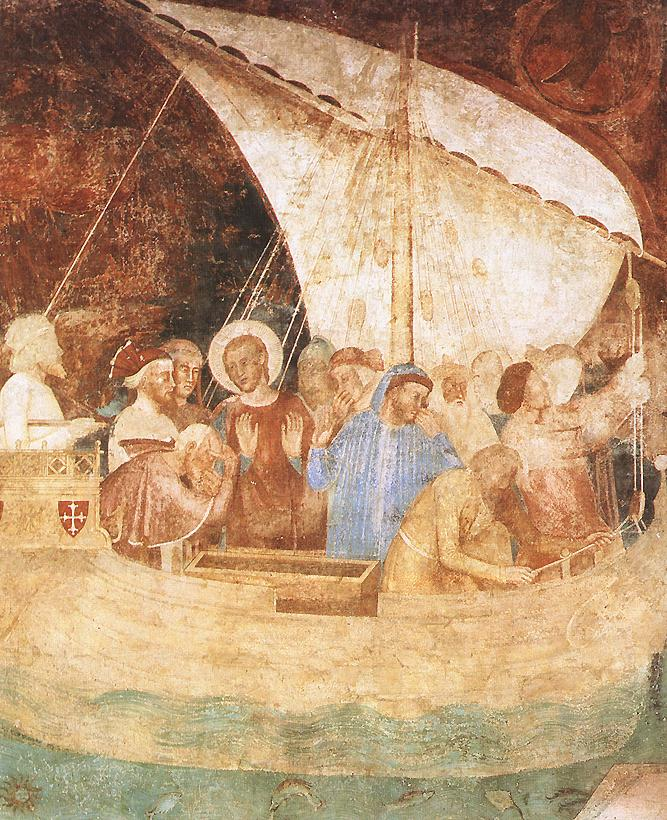
Scene from the life of Saint Rainerius. Detail from a fresco of Andrea di Bonaiuto da Firenze in the Campo Santo.

In 1153, Rainerius returned to Pisa and entered the monastery of Saint Andrew (Sant'Andrea) and subsequently that of Saint Vitus. There he achieved fame and became a preacher, being treated like a saint even in his lifetime, reputedly expelling demons and performing miracles. His body was carried in a triumph through the city to its resting place in the Duomo of Pisa upon his death.

== Veneration ==
His life was the subject of a cycle of frescos by Antonio Veneziano in the Campo Santo. According to later stories, he was canonised by Pope Alexander III. In 1161 or 1162, a Pisan canon named Benincasa wrote a long and invaluable vita of the saint. He says Rainerius resembled the Son of God through his life of strict imitatio Christi (imitation of Christ). Benincasa also goes so far as to claim "a royal priesthood in Christ" of which Rainerius and all the baptised were a part.

With the growth of Pisan influence, Rainerius's cult spread throughout the Mediterranean. In 1632 the Archbishop of Pisa, the local clergy, and the Pisan magistrates elected Rainerius as the patron saint of the city and the diocese. In 1689 his body was translated to the altar of the Duomo. He is generally portrayed as a bearded hermit in a hairshirt holding a rosary; as a young pilgrim in a hairshirt carrying a banner with the Pisan cross; as being raised by devils; or as dying in a hairshirt.
