= Rayner (disambiguation) =

Rayner is a given name and a surname.

Rayner may also refer to:

- Rayner (company), British medical equipment manufacturing company
- Rayner Glacier, Antarctica
- Rayner orogeny, Antarctica
- Rayner Peak, Antarctica
- Rayner Point, Antarctica
- Rayners Lane
