= Rein (given name) =

Male given name

- Gender: Male
- Name day: 16 July (Estonia)

Rein is a male given name. People with the given name or nickname include:

== Given name ==
- Rein Aedma (born 1952), Estonian actor
- Rein Ahas (1966–2018), Estonian geographer and professor
- Rein Ahun (1940–2016), Estonian hammer thrower and track and field coach
- Rein Aidma (born 1950), Estonian politician
- Rein Aren (1927–1990), Estonian actor
- Rein Arjukese (1941–2018), Estonian naturalist, dissident and politician
- Rein Aun (1940–1995), Estonian decathlete
- Rein Baart (born 1972), Dutch football goalkeeper
- Rein van Duijnhoven (born 1967), Dutch football goalkeeper
- Rein Eliaser (1885–1941), Estonian lawyer and politician
- Rein Gilje (born 1959), Norwegian sprint canoeist
- Rein Haljand (born 1945), Estonian swimmer and sports pedagogue
- Rein Henriksen (1915–1994), Norwegian lawyer and industrialist
- Rein Jan Hoekstra (born 1941), Dutch politician
- Rein Järvelill (born 1966), Estonian politician
- Rein Jonker (born 1950), Dutch speed skater
- Rein Karemäe (1934–2014), Estonian journalist, television presenter and politician
- Rein Kask (born 1947), Estonian politician
- Rein Kikerpill (born 1962), Estonian journalist and politician
- Rein Kilk (born 1953), Estonian entrepreneur and sports figure
- Rein Lang (born 1957), Estonian politician and diplomat
- Rein Loik (born 1950), Estonian politician, mountain climber and sports figure
- Rein Müllerson (born 1944), Estonian legal scholar and politician
- Rein Oja (born 1956), Estonian actor and director
- Rein Otsason (1931–2004), Estonian banker
- Rein Ottoson (born 1953), Estonian sailing coach
- Rein Pill (born 1961), Estonian equestrian
- Rein Põder (1943–2018), Estonian writer
- Rein Põldme (born 1937), Estonian rower, swimming coach and sports figure
- Rein Rannap (born 1953), Estonian composer and pianist
- Rein Ratas (1938–2022), Estonian politician
- Rein Raud (born 1961), Estonian scholar and author
- Rein Saluri (1939–2023), Estonian writer
- Rein Sokk (born 1959), Estonian sports coach and track and field athlete
- Rein Suurkask (born 1968), Estonian politician
- Rein Suvi (born 1969), Estonian handball player
- Rein Taagepera (born 1933), Estonian-American political scientist and politician
- Rein Taaramäe (born 1987), Estonian road bicycle racer
- Rein Tamme (1940–2024), Estonian civil engineer and politician
- Rein Tölp (1941–2018), Estonian middle-distance runner
- Rein Valdmaa (born 1960), Estonian runner
- Rein Voog (born 1964), Estonian politician
- Rein Willems (born 1945), Dutch businessman

== Nickname ==
- Rein Boomsma (1879–1943), Dutch footballer
- Rein Ozoline (born 1967), Australian former Olympic wrestler
- Rein Strikwerda (1930–2006), Dutch orthopedic surgeon
- Rein de Waal (1904–1985), Dutch field hockey player
- Rein Welschen (1941–2013), Dutch politician
