= Reinier =

Reinier is the Dutch form of the Germanic masculine given name Raginheri, composed of the two elements ragin ("advice") and heri ("army"). It is equivalent to Scandinavian Ragnar, German Rainer, French Rainier, and Spanish and Italian Raniero. An archaic spelling is Reynier or Reijnier. People with the name Reinier include:

Reinier

- Reinier Alcántara (born 1982), Cuban footballer
- Reinier Asmoredjo (born 1962), Surinamese artist
- Reinier Cornelis Bakhuizen van den Brink (born 1881), Dutch biologist
- Reinier Cornelis Bakhuizen van den Brink (born 1911), Dutch biologist, and son of the above.
- Reinier Beeuwkes (1884–1963), Dutch footballer
- Reinier Blom (1867–1943), Dutch gymnast
- Reinier Boitet (1691–1758), Dutch publisher and writer
- Reinier Butöt, Dutch curler
- Reinier Camminga (fl. 1300-1306), Governor of Friesland
- Reinier Craeyvanger (1812–1880), Dutch painter and etcher
- Reinier Estpinan (born 1982), Cuban sport shooter
- Reinier de Graaf (1641–1673), Dutch physician and anatomist
- Reinier de Graaf (architect) (born 1964), Dutch architect
- Reinier de Ridder (born 1990), Dutch mixed martial artist
- Reinier Groenendaal (born 1951), Dutch cyclo-crosser
- Reinier Honig (born 1983), Dutch racing cyclist
- Reinier Jesus Carvalho (born 2002), Brazilian footballer
- Reinier Kreijermaat (1935–2018), Dutch footballer
- Reinier Leers (1654–1714), Dutch publisher
- Reinier Nooms (c. 1623–1667), Dutch maritime painter a.k.a. as Reinier Zeeman
- Reinier van Oldenbarnevelt (c.1588–1623), Dutch political figure, son of Johan van Oldenbarnevelt
- Reinier Paping (1931–2021), Dutch speed skater, winner of the Elfstedentocht of 1963
- Reinier Pauw (1564–1636), Dutch merchant and mayor of Amsterdam
- Reinier van Persijn (1615–1668), Dutch engraver of portraits and bookplates
- Reinier Por (died 1653), Dutch governor of Mauritius
- Reinier Robbemond (born 1972), Dutch football player and manager
- Reinier Rojas (born 1986), Cuban volleyball player
- Reinier Saxton (born 1988), Dutch golfer
- Reinier Johannes Charles Smits (born 1953), Dutch linguist
- Reinier van Tzum (c.1605–1670), Dutch merchant and official of the Dutch East India Company
- Reinier Vinkeles (1741–1816), Dutch painter and engraver
- Reinier Wilhelmus Welschen (1941–2013), Dutch Labour Party politician

Reynier

- Reynier Anslo (1622–1669), Dutch poet
- Reynier Casamayor Griñán (b. 1975), Cuban musician and medical doctor
- Reynier Covyn (1632–1681), Dutch genre painter
- Reynier van Gherwen (1620–1662), Dutch painter
- Reynier Hals (1627–1672), Dutch painter, son of Frans Hals
- Reynier de Klerck (1710–1780), Governor-General of the Dutch East Indies
- Reynier Mena (b. 1996), Cuban sprinter
- Reynier Schaets (d. 1691), surgeon and justice at Schenectady, New York, where he died in the Schenectady Massacre
- Reynier van Rooyen (b. 1990), South African rugby player
- Reynier Jacob Wortendyke Jr. (1895–1975), United States federal judge

Renyer

- Renyer (b. 2003), Brazilian footballer

== See also ==
- Rainer (disambiguation)
- Reginar
- Regnier (disambiguation)
- Reynier (disambiguation)
- Renyer
