= Reinhard =

Reinhard is a given name and surname of Germanic origin. (from Germanic ragin, counsel, and hart, strong), and a spelling variant of Reinhardt and Reinhart.

== Persons with the given name ==
- Reinhard of Blankenburg (after 1107 – 1123), German bishop
- Reinhard Adler (1947–2025), German football player
- Reinhard Böhler (1945–1995), German sidecarcross racer
- Reinhard Bonnke (1940–2019), German evangelist
- Rainhard Fendrich (born 1955), Austrian singer-songwriter
- Reinhard Gehlen (1902–1979), German spymaster
- Reinhard Genzel (born 1952), German astrophysicist and Nobel Prize winner
- Reinhard Heydrich (1904–1942), German Nazi leader
- Reinhard Maack (1892–1969), German explorer
- Reinhard Mey (born 1942), German singer
- Reinhard Mohn (1921–2009), German media tycoon
- Reinhard Scheer (1863–1928), German admiral
- Reinhard Selten (1930–2016), German economist
- Reinhard Strohm (born 1942), German musicologist
- Reinhard Stupperich (born 1951), German classical archaeologist
- Reinhard Wendemuth (born 1948), German rower

== Persons with the surname ==
- Blaire Reinhard, American musician
- Bob Reinhard (1920–1996), American football player
- Charles-Frédéric Reinhard (1761–1837), French diplomat and politician
- Christopher Reinhard (born 1985), German football (soccer) player
- Edwin Reinhard, a pseudonym of Edwin Rist, American flautist and fly-tyer
- Franz Volkmar Reinhard (1753–1812), German theologian
- Johan Reinhard (born 1943), American mountaineer and archaeologist
- Kurt Reinhard (1914–1979), German ethnomusicologist and composer
- Kurt Reinhard, Austrian Righteous among the Nations
- Ulrike Reinhard (born 1960), German author and futurist
- Wilhelm Reinhard (pilot) (1891–1918), German flying ace
- Reinhardt family, sometimes spelled Reinhard, Austrian family of musicians that flourished in the 18th and 19th centuries

== Fictional characters ==
- Reinhard von Lohengramm, a character in the anime series Legend of the Galactic Heroes
- Reinhard van Astrea, a character in the light novel series Re:Zero − Starting Life in Another World

== See also ==
- Operation Reinhard
- Regenhard, Reinert, Reinhard, Reinhardt, Reinhart, Renard, Renart, Reynard, Reynert, Rinehart
- Different etymologies: Reiner, Renner, Rennert
