= Reinert =

Reinert is a surname and a male given name.

== Persons with the surname ==
- Al Reinert (1947–2018), American journalist and film producer
- Alexander A. Reinert, professor of law
- Bianca Reinert (c.1966–2018), Brazilian ornithologist
- Emil-Edwin Reinert (1903–1953), French film director and screenwriter
- Emmanuel Reinert
- Erik S. Reinert (born 1949), Norwegian economist
- Ernst-Wilhelm Reinert (1919–2007), German military aviator
- Gesine Reinert, statistician at Oxford
- Johan Reinert Reiersen (1810–1864), Norwegian-American writer
- Katrin Reinert (born 1988), German rower
- Paul C. Reinert (1910–2001), president of Saint Louis University (United States)
- Rick Reinert (1925–2018), American animator
- Robert Reinert (1872–1928), German film director and screenwriter
- Roger Reinert (born 1970), American politician
- Sean Reinert (1971–2020), American drummer
- Sebastian Reinert (born 1987), German footballer
- Susan Reinert (died 1979), American murder victim

== Persons with the given name ==
- Reinert Torgeirson (1884–1969), Norwegian newspaper editor, politician, poet, playwright and novelist

== See also ==
- Regenhard, Reinert, Reinhard, Reinhardt, Reinhart, Renard, Renart, Reynard, Reynert, Rinehart
- Different etymologies: Reiner, Renner, Rennert
