= Rayne (surname) =

Rayne is a surname. Notable people with the surname include:

- Amber Rayne (1984–2016), American pornographic actress
- Cuthbert Rayne (fl.c.1600), hunter at the court of James VI of Scotland
- Dana Rayne (born 1981), American dance and pop singer
- Edward Rayne (1922–1992), British industrialist
- Joel Rayne, Antigua and Barbuda politician
- Julie Rayne (1930‒2025), English singer and entertainer
- Keith Rayne (born 1956), English rugby league footballer
- Kevin Rayne (born 1956), English rugby league footballer
- Madison Rayne (born 1986), ring name of American professional wrestler Ashley Cabot (née Simmons)
- Martha Louise Rayne (1836–1911), American journalist
- Max Rayne, Baron Rayne (1918–2003), British property developer and philanthropist
- Tyrell Rayne (born 1994), Canadian association football player

Fictional characters:

- Ethan Rayne, character on Buffy the Vampire Slayer

== See also ==
- Raine (surname)
- Raynes, a surname
- Reyne
