= Reginar =

Reginar may refer to:

- Reginar Longneck, Duke of Lorraine (c. 850–915)
- Reginar II, Count of Hainaut (c. 890–932)
- Reginar III, Count of Hainaut (c. 920–973)
- Reginar IV, Count of Mons (c. 950–1013)
- Reginar V, Count of Mons (c. 995–1039)
- Reginarids/House of Reginar

== See also ==
- Ragnar (disambiguation)
- Rainer (disambiguation)
- Regnier (disambiguation)
- Reinier (disambiguation)
- Reynier (disambiguation)
