= Regnier (surname) =

Regnier is a surname, and may refer to:

- Adolphe Regnier (1804–1884), French philologist
- Adrian Regnier (1889–1956), American football player and coach
- Albert Regnier (1872–1925), French sports shooter
- Cédric Regnier-Lafforgue (born 1977), French freestyle skier
- Eva Regnier (born 1971), American decision scientist
- François Augustin Regnier de Jarjayes (1745–1822), French royalist noble
- François-Joseph Regnier (1807–1885), French actor and playwright
- Jacques Auguste Regnier (1787–1860), French painter
- Jean-Michel Regnier, French slalom canoeist
- Jim Regnier (born 1944), American judge from Montana
- Julien Regnier-Lafforgue (born 1979), French freestyle skier
- Lance Regnier (1919–1982), Australian rules footballer
- Marc Regnier, American classical guitarist
- Mary Pius Regnier (1914–2005), American Catholic nun
- Nicole Regnier (born 1995), Colombian footballer
- Patrice M. Regnier (born 1953), American choreographer
- Pete Regnier (1896–1938), American football player
- Victor A. Regnier (born 1947), American architect and academic

== See also ==
- Régnier
- Rainier (surname)
