= Johann Adam Reincken =

Dutch-German organist and composer (1643–1722)

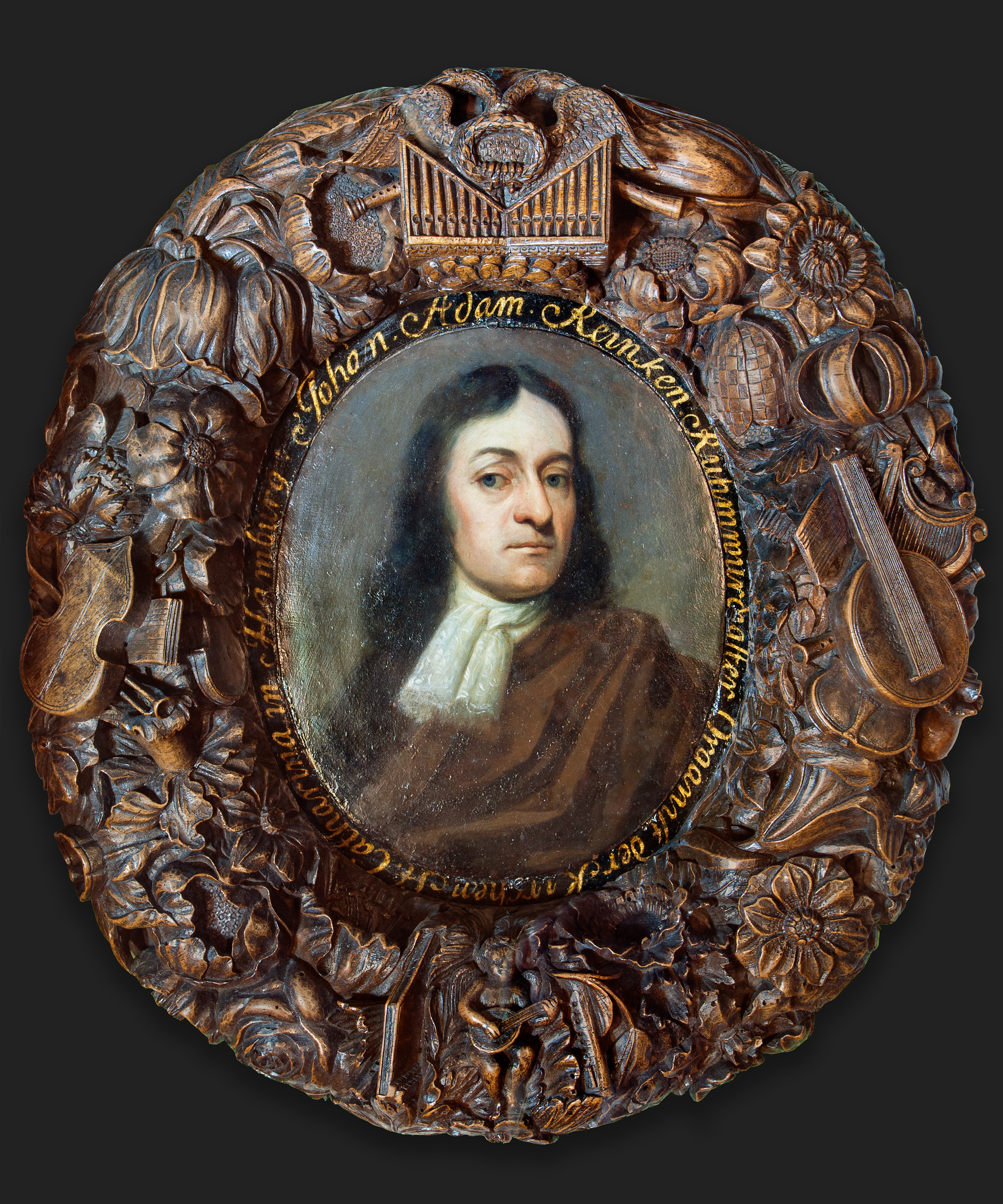
- 1674 portrait of Reincken by Godfrey Kneller
- Born: Deventer, Overijssel, Dutch Republic
- Baptised: 10 December 1643
- Died: 24 November 1722 (aged c. 79)
- Occupations: Organist; composer
- Years active: 1657–1722
- Era: Baroque
- Style: Classical

Johann Adam Reincken (Note: Also recorded as Jan Adams, Jean Adam, Reinken, Reinkinck, Reincke, Reinicke or Reinike) (baptized 10 December 1643 – 24 November 1722) was a Dutch-German organist and composer. He was one of the most important composers of the 17th century, a friend of Dieterich Buxtehude, and a major influence on Johann Sebastian Bach; however, very few of his works survive to this day.

== Biography ==
The widespread claims about Reincken's exceptional longevity stem from Johann Mattheson, who, writing in 1722, gave his date of birth as 27 April 1623. However, Reincken himself stated (on the title page of Hortus musicus) that his birthplace was Deventer, and no records were found there to support Mattheson's claim. A "Jan Reinse" was baptized in Deventer on 10 December 1643; this is the date currently accepted by most scholars, although it is in many ways as problematic as that given by Mattheson.

Reincken received primary music education in Deventer in 1650–1654 from Lucas van Lennick, organist of the Grote kerk (Lebuïnuskerk). In 1654, he departed for Hamburg to study under Heinrich Scheidemann, a pupil of Jan Pieterszoon Sweelinck, organist of St. Katharine's Church (Katharinenkirche). In 1657, he returned to Deventer and became organist of the Bergkerk on 11 March; however, after only a year, he left for Hamburg again, this time to become Scheidemann's assistant. When the older composer died in 1663, Reincken succeeded him at St. Katharine's. In 1665, he married one of Scheidemann's daughters, and their only child, Margaretha-Maria, was born three years later.

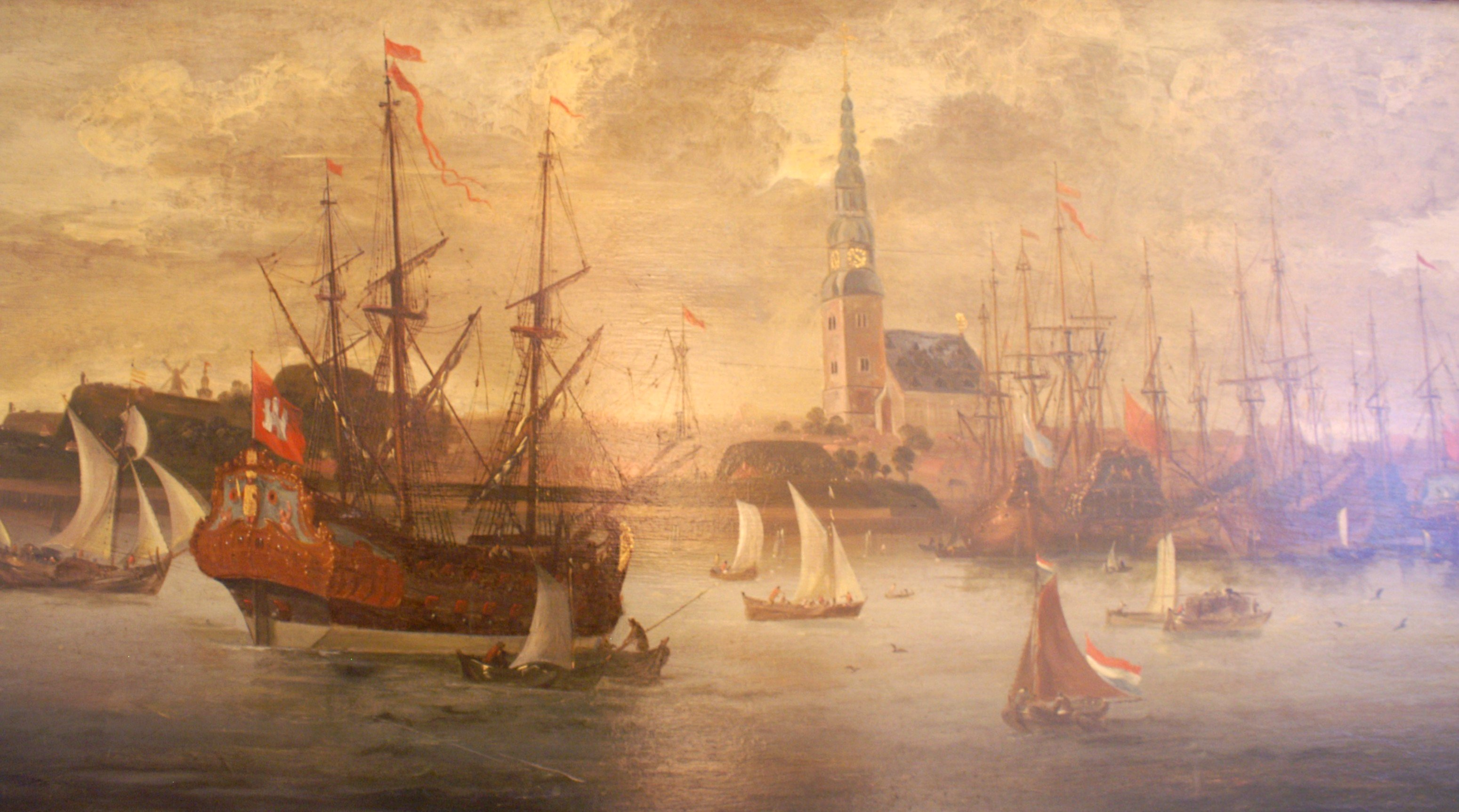
A painting of the ship Leopoldus Primus in Hamburg by Johann Georg Stuhr, 1688. St. Catherine's Church is visible in the background.

Reincken kept his position at St. Katharine's until his death in 1722, although in 1705 some of the church elders attempted to appoint Johann Mattheson as Reincken's successor. Unlike many other contemporary organists, Reincken died wealthy. In his lifetime he was heralded as one of the best organists in Germany; he knew Dieterich Buxtehude closely and influenced Vincent Lübeck and Johann Sebastian Bach. A well-known anecdote tells of Bach's visit to Hamburg in 1720, and how Reincken, after hearing Bach improvise a lengthy fantasia on the Lutheran chorale "An Wasserflüssen Babylon" (paying homage to Reincken's massive fantasia on the same chorale), remarked, "I thought that this art was dead, but I see that it lives in you." Christoph Wolff adds a further detail, that on the same occasion Bach performed his organ fugue BWV 542, the theme of which is based on a Dutch popular tune (called "Ik ben gegroet van..."), presumably as an homage to Reincken's Dutch origin. Evidently, the young Sebastian Bach had been deeply impressed by Reincken's music, for he arranged several of the works from Reincken's Hortus musicus (as BWV 954, 965 and 966). In 2006, the earliest known Bach autograph was discovered in Weimar. It proved to be a copy of Reincken's An Wasserflüssen Babylon, which Bach made for his then-teacher Georg Böhm in Lüneburg in 1700.

== List of works ==
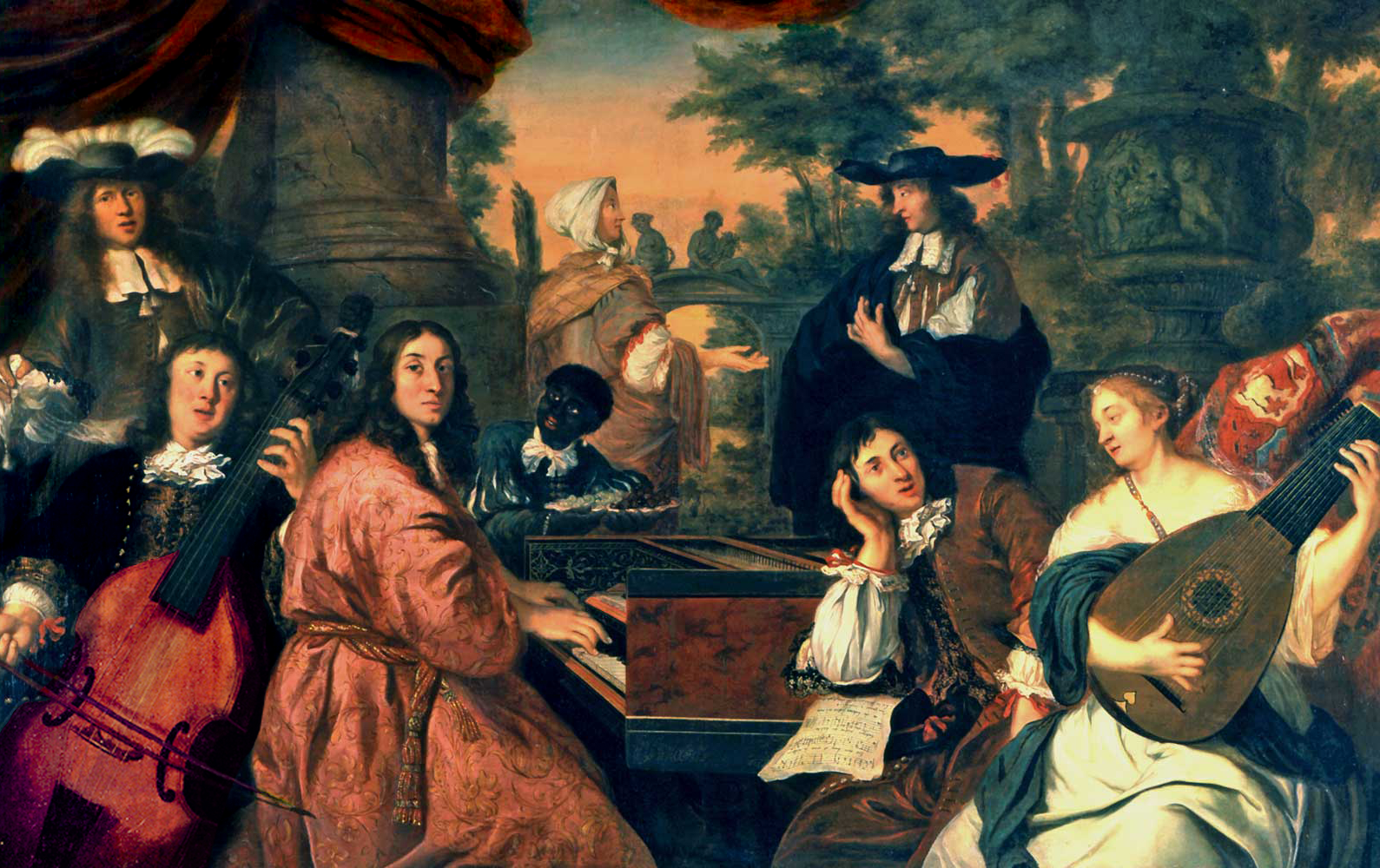
Johannes Voorhout, Domestic Music Scene, 1674. The man at the harpsichord is almost certainly Reincken, on his left most probably Dieterich Buxtehude (playing the viola da gamba), and on his right, below the harpsichord, possibly Johann Theile.

=== For keyboard ===
- Chorale fantasia, An Wasserflüssen Babylon
- Chorale fantasia, Was kann uns kommen an für Not
- Variations on Schweiget mir von Weibernehmen (la Meyerin) (Amsterdam, c. 1710)
- Variations on Holländische Nachtigahl (Amsterdam, c. 1710)
- Ballett with Variations (Amsterdam, c. 1710)
- Toccata in G major
- Toccata in G minor (doubtful)
- Toccata quasi Fantasia con Fuge in A major, BWV Anh. 178 (doubtful)
- Fugue in G minor (spurious)
- 8 harpsichord suites
- Musicalischer Clavierschatz del J.A. Reincken (1702, lost)

=== Other instrumental ===
- Hortus Musicus (1688), six sonatas and suites for two violins, viola da gamba and basso continuo
- Sonaten, Concertaten, Allemanden, Correnten, Sarabanden und Chiguen (1704), for two violins and harpsichord (lost)

=== Canons ===
- Was Gott thut, das ist wohl getan
- Canon a 3 voci in Hypodiapason per Augmentationem

== Bibliography ==
- Dirksen, Pieter [in Dutch] (1998). "Zur Frage des Autors der A-Dur-Toccata BWV Anh. 178" [On the question of the composer of the Toccata in A major BWV Anh. 178]. In Schulze, Hans-Joachim; Wolff, Christoph (eds.). Bach-Jahrbuch 1998 [Bach Yearbook 1998]. Bach-Jahrbuch (in German). Vol. 84. Neue Bachgesellschaft, Bach Archive. Leipzig: Evangelische Verlagsanstalt. pp. 121–136. doi:10.13141/bjb.v1998. ISBN 3-374-01695-2. ISSN 0084-7682.
- Grapenthin, Ulf (2001). "Reincken, Johann Adam". In Sadie, Stanley; Tyrrell, John (eds.). The New Grove Dictionary of Music and Musicians (2nd ed.). London: Macmillan. ISBN 978-1-56159-239-5.
- Wolff, Christoph (2000). Johan Sebastian Bach: The Learned Musician. New York: W. W. Norton & Company. ISBN 978-0-393-04825-4. OCLC 1302083917 – via Internet Archive.
