= Joseph Hubert Reinkens =

German Old Catholic bishop

Bishop Joseph Hubert Reinkens

Joseph Hubert Reinkens (March 1, 1821 – January 4, 1896) was the first German Old Catholic bishop.

== Biography ==
He was born at Burtscheid (now part of Aachen) in the Rhine Province, the son of a gardener. In 1836, on the death of his mother, he took to manual work in order to support his numerous brothers and sisters, but in 1840 he was able to go to the gymnasium at Aachen, and he afterwards studied theology at the universities of Bonn and Munich. He was ordained priest in 1848, and in 1849 graduated as doctor in theology. He was soon appointed professor of ecclesiastical history at Breslau, and in 1865 he was made rector of the university. During this period he wrote, among other treatises, monographs on Clement of Alexandria, Hilary of Poitiers and Martin of Tours.

In consequence of an essay on art, especially in tragedy, after Aristotle, he was made a doctor of philosophy in the university of Leipzig. When, in 1870, the question of papal infallibility was raised, Reinkens attached himself to the party opposed to the proclamation of the dogma. He wrote several pamphlets on church tradition relative to infallibility and on the procedure of the Council. When the dogma of infallibility was proclaimed, Reinkens joined the band of influential theologians, headed by Ignaz von Döllinger, who resolved to organize resistance to the decree. He was one of those who signed the Declaration of Nuremberg in 1871, and at the Bonn conferences with Orientals and Anglicans in 1874 and 1875 he was conspicuous.

The Old Catholics having decided to separate themselves from the Church of Rome, Reinkens was chosen their bishop in Germany at an enthusiastic meeting at Cologne in 1873. In August of that year he was consecrated by Hermann Heykamp, bishop of Deventer (not to be confused with his nephew, Johannes Heykamp, later Archbishop of Utrecht. Reinkens devoted himself zealously to his office, and it was due to his efforts that the Old Catholic movement crystallized into an organized church, with a definite status in the various German states. He wrote a number of theological works after his consecration, but none of them so important as his treatise on Cyprian and the Unity of the Church (1873).

The chief act of his episcopal career was his consecration in 1876 of Dr Eduard Herzog to preside as bishop over the Old Catholic Church in Switzerland. In 1881 Reinkens visited England, and received Holy Communion more than once with bishops, clergy and laity of the Church of England, and in 1894 he defended the validity of Anglican orders against his co-religionists, the Old Catholics of the Netherlands who later recognised the orders. He died at Bonn on 4 January 1896.
