= Heinz Reincke =

German actor (1925–2011)

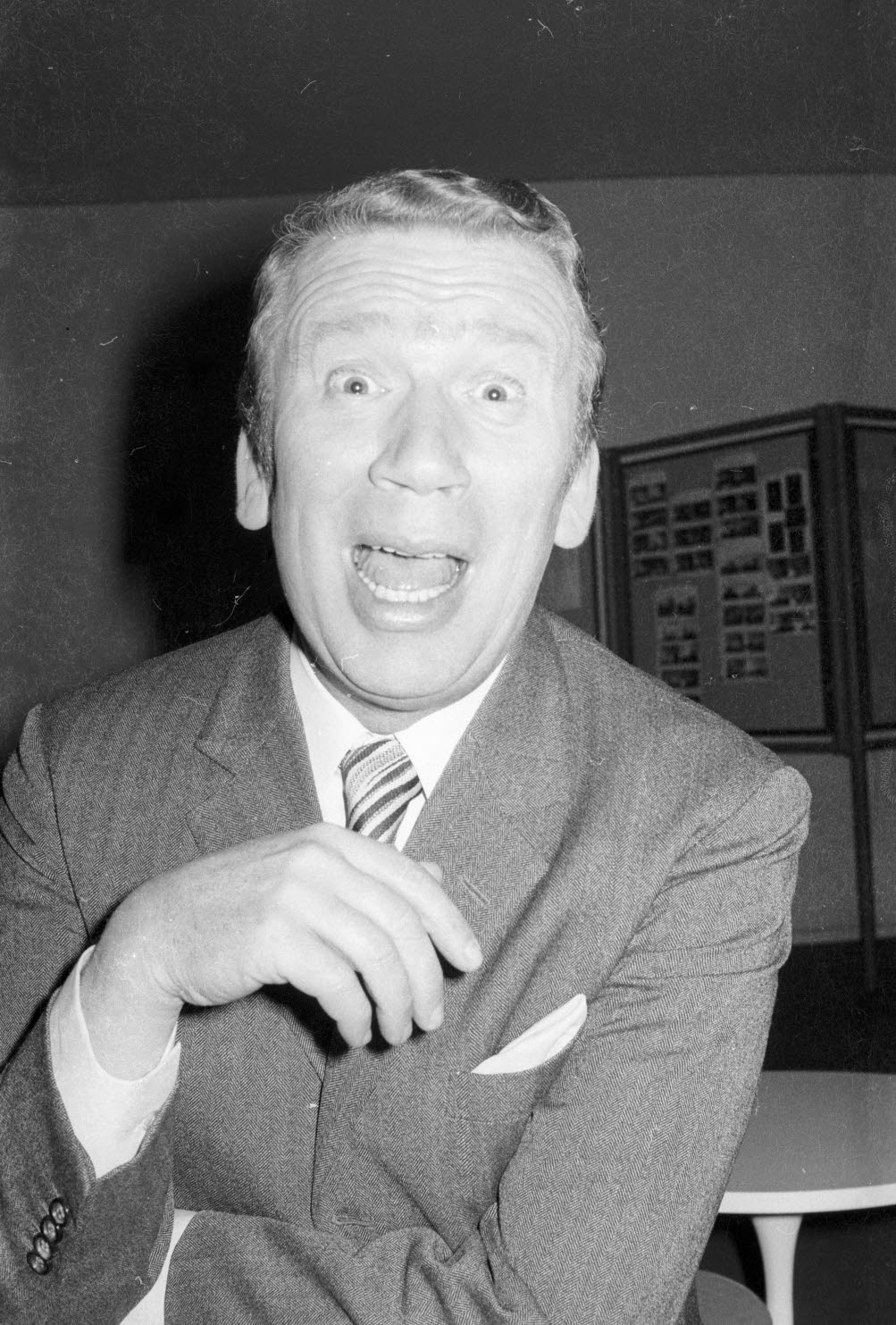
- in 1973
- Born: 28 May 1925; Kiel, Germany
- Died: 13 July 2011 (aged 86); Purkersdorf, Austria
- Occupation: Actor
- Years active: 1956–2010

Karl-Heinz Reincke (28 May 1925 – 13 July 2011) was a German-born actor, long-based in Vienna.

== Selected filmography ==
=== Films ===
- A Heart Returns Home (1956) - Besselmann
- Confessions of Felix Krull (1957) - Stanko
- Tolle Nacht (1957) - Fotograf Alfred Erdmann
- Der 10. Mai (1957) - Werner Kramer
- Nasser Asphalt (1958) - Der Blinde
- Pezzo, capopezzo e capitano (1958) - Hans Richter
- Faust (1960) - Frosch
- The Longest Day (1962) - Col. Josef 'Pips' Priller (uncredited)
- Homesick for St. Pauli (1963) - (uncredited)
- Mark of the Tortoise (1964) - Inspektor Dickes
- Freddy, Tiere, Sensationen (1964) - Karl
- Murderers Club of Brooklyn (1967) - Sam
- When Night Falls on the Reeperbahn (1967) - Uwe Wagenknecht
- The Doctor of St. Pauli (1968) - Willi Nippes
- Commandos (1968) - Offizier Hans
- The Bridge at Remagen (1969) - Councillor Holzgang
- Heintje: A Heart Goes on a Journey (1969) - Alfred Teichmann
- On the Reeperbahn at Half Past Midnight (1969) - Pit Pitter Pittjes
- Heintje – Einmal wird die Sonne wieder scheinen (1970) - Klaus Helwig
- The Priest of St. Pauli (1970) - Titus Kleinwiehe
- Heintje - Mein bester Freund (1970) - Peter Fleming
- Kelly's Heroes (1970) - (uncredited)
- My Father, the Ape and I (1971) - Konsul Hansen
- Morgen fällt die Schule aus (1971) - Herr van Dongen
- Captain Typhoon (1971) - Oliver Kniehase
- Jailbreak in Hamburg (1971) - Heinz Jensen
- Rudi, Behave! (1971) - Kellner (uncredited)
- The Reverend Turns a Blind Eye (1971) - Alfred
- Sie nannten ihn Krambambuli (1972) - Traugott Jellinek
- Kinderarzt Dr. Fröhlich (1972) - Max
- My Daughter, Your Daughter (1972) - Schuldiener Oskar Sommer
- Always Trouble with the Reverend (1972) - Alfred
- Ein Käfer gibt Vollgas (1972) - Maggio
- Crazy - Completely Mad (1973) - Major Karloff
- Trip to Vienna (1973) - Hauptmann Sperlinger
- The Bloody Vultures of Alaska (1973) - Capt'n Brandy
- Wenn jeder Tag ein Sonntag wär (1973) - Bubi Berger
- The Flying Classroom (1973) - Dr. Robert Uthofft, gen. Nichtraucher
- Der Lord von Barmbeck (1974) - Lockenfietje
- The Secret Carrier (1975)
- Everyone Dies Alone (1976) - Emil Borkhausen
- The Mimosa Wants to Blossom Too (1976) - Obdachloser
- Lady Dracula (1977) - Betrunkener (uncredited)
- Hurra - Die Schwedinnen sind da (1978) - Heinz
- Love Hotel in Tyrol (1978) - Prokurator
- Die unendliche Geschichte (1984) - Fuchur (German version, voice, uncredited)
- Nägel mit Köpfen (1986) - Museumsdirektor
- Schlußabrechnung (1993) - Georg Halbe

=== TV movies/series ===
- Adrian der Tulpendieb (1966) - Adrian
- Derrick - Season 11, Episode 6: "Keine schöne Fahrt nach Rom" (1984) - Spediteur Henschel
- Der Landarzt (1987–2010) - Albert Eckholm
- Zwei Münchner in Hamburg (1989–1993) - Vadder Alfred Haack
- Großstadtrevier - Altes Eisen (1991-2001) - Paul Lampe / Hans Menzel
- Heimatgeschichten (1995-2004) - Konrad Prack / Rudi / Henry Köhler / Various Characters
- Sylter Geschichten (1996) - Jens Jensen
- Die Männer vom K3 (1996) - Heinrich Fitschen
- Geschichten aus der Heimat - Affenliebe (1997)
- Zwei Asse und ein König (2000) - Paulsen
- Oben ohne (2007-2010) - Willi Horrowitz
