= Régnier =

Régnier is a surname, and may refer to:

- Charles Régnier (1914–2001), German actor
- Claude Ambroise Régnier (1746–1814), French lawyer and politician
- Claude Louis François Régnier de Guerchy (1715–1767), French diplomat
- Edmé Régnier L'Aîné (1751–1825), French pistol maker
- Émile Régnier (1894–1940), French flying ace
- François-Séraphin Régnier-Desmarais (1632–1713), French diplomat and writer
- Georges Régnier (1913–1992), French film director and screenwriter
- Henri de Régnier (1864–1936), French poet
- Joseph Kuhn-Régnier (1873–1940), French affichiste and caricaturist
- Laurier Régnier (1903–1990), Canadian politician
- Marie Régnier (1840–1887), French writer
- Marie de Régnier (1875–1963), French novelist and poet
- Mathurin Régnier (1573–1613), French writer
- Max Régnier (1907–1993), French actor and director
- Michel Régnier (1931–1999), pseudonym Greg (cartoonist), Belgian comics writer and artist
- Natacha Régnier (born 1974), Belgian actress
- Nicolas Régnier (1591–1667), Flemish-Italian painter
- Paule Régnier (1888–1950), French writer
- Philippe Régnier, Swiss economist and academic
- René-François Régnier (1794–1881), French cardinal
- Roberto Régnier, Belgian colonial administrator
- Thomas Régnier (born 1984), French footballer
- Victor Régnier (1889–1961), French World War I flying ace

== See also ==
- Regnier (surname)
