= Renyer =

Brazilian footballer

Personal information
- Full name: Renyer Luan de Oliveira Damasceno
- Date of birth: 12 July 2003 (age 23)
- Place of birth: Rio de Janeiro, Brazil
- Height: 1.74 m (5 ft 9 in)
- Position: Forward

Team information
- Current team: Azuriz

Youth career
- 2013–2023: Santos

Senior career*
Years	Team	Apps	(Gls)
2020–2023	Santos	8	(0)
2024	Guarani	3	(0)
2025	Pogoń Szczecin	0	(0)
2025	Pogoń Szczecin II	1	(0)
2026–	Azuriz	0	(0)

International career
2018	Brazil U15		
2019	Brazil U17	4	(1)
- * Club domestic league appearances and goals as of 18:57, 1 May 2025 (UTC)

Renyer Luan de Oliveira Damasceno (born 12 July 2003), simply known as Renyer, is a Brazilian professional footballer who plays as a forward for Azuriz.

== Club career ==
=== Santos ===
Born in Rio de Janeiro, Renyer represented Fluminense and Flamengo's futsal teams before joining Santos' youth setup in 2013, aged ten. On 20 December 2019, after lengthy negotiations, he signed his first professional contract with the club.

On 29 January 2020, Renyer was inscribed in the year's Campeonato Paulista, and was called up to the main squad for a match against Inter de Limeira by new manager Jesualdo Ferreira. He made his first team debut on the following day, coming on as a second-half substitute for Tailson in the 2–0 home win; aged 16 years and 206 days, he became the fifth youngest ever debutant in the club's history.

In March 2020, Renyer suffered a serious knee injury while training with the under-17 national team, being sidelined for six months. He made his Série A debut the following 26 January, replacing fellow youth graduate Marcos Leonardo in a 0–2 away loss against Atlético Mineiro.

In 2021, after being rarely used, Renyer returned to the under-20 squad.

=== Guarani ===
On 20 March 2024, Renyer was announced at Guarani. After making three league appearances, he terminated his contract in August 2024.

=== Pogoń Szczecin ===
On 19 February 2025, Renyer joined Polish Ekstraklasa club Pogoń Szczecin on a deal until June 2028. He left the club at the end of 2025, without making a first-team appearance.

=== Back to Brazil ===
On 24 August 2026, after eight months without a club, Renyer signed with Azuriz for the Taça FPF.

== International career ==
After representing Brazil under-15s in 2018, Renyer was called up to the under-17s in March 2019, for the year's Montaigu Tournament. He appeared in Brazil's all four matches of the competition, scoring once against France on 20 April.

On 12 February 2021, Renyer and Santos teammate Marcos Leonardo were called up to the under-18s.

== Career statistics ==
As of match played 8 March 2025

Appearances and goals by club, season and competition
Club	Season	League			State league (Note: Includes Campeonato Paulista)		National cup		Continental		Other		Total	
Club	Season	Division	Apps	Goals	Apps	Goals	Apps	Goals	Apps	Goals	Apps	Goals	Apps	Goals
Santos	2020	Série A	1	0	3	0	0	0	0	0	—		4	0
Santos	2021	Série A	0	0	4	0	0	0	0	0	6 (Note: Appearances in Copa Paulista)	1	10	1
Santos	Total		1	0	7	0	0	0	0	0	6	1	14	1
Guarani	2024	Série B	3	0	—		—		—		—		3	0
Pogoń Szczecin	2024–25	Ekstraklasa	0	0	—		0	0	—		—		0	0
Pogoń Szczecin II	2024–25	III liga, gr. II	1	0	—		—		—		—		1	0
Pogoń Szczecin II	2025–26	III liga, gr. II	0	0	—		—		—		—		0	0
Pogoń Szczecin II	Total		1	0	—		—		—		—		1	0
Career total			5	0	7	0	0	0	0	0	6	1	18	1
