= Reyne =

Surname

Reyne is a surname. Notable people with the surname include:

- David Reyne (born 1959), Australian actor, musician and television presenter
- Jaime Robbie Reyne (born 1985), Australian singer/songwriter and actor
- James Reyne (born 1957), Australian rock musician and singer/songwriter, member of the band Australian Crawl and soloist
- Jordan Reyne (born 1974), experimental musician from New Zealand, described as “industrial-tinged folk” and “antipodean Steampunk”

== See also ==
- Hard Reyne, the second solo album by Australian singer/songwriter James Reyne, released in 1989
- James Reyne (album)
