= Oscar Reynert Olsen =

Norwegian visual artist (1925–2026)

- Born: 23 May 1925; Stavanger, Norway
- Died: 1 October 2026 (aged 101)
- Education: Norwegian National Academy of Craft and Art Industry; Norwegian National Academy of Fine Arts
- Occupations: Illustrator; painter; printmaker

Oscar Reynert Olsen (23 May 1925 – 1 October 2026) was a Norwegian illustrator, painter, graphical artist and lecturer.

== Life and career ==
Olsen was born in Stavanger on 23 May 1925. He studied at the Norwegian National Academy of Craft and Art Industry and at the Norwegian National Academy of Fine Arts. From 1952 to 1958 he worked as illustrator for the newspaper Arbeiderbladet. Among his book illustrations are woodcuts for the novel series Nattens brød by Johan Falkberget. He was appointed lecturer at the Norwegian National Academy of Craft and Art Industry. He is represented at the National Gallery of Norway, Riksgalleriet and other art galleries. His works at the National Museum of Norway include the painting Drager, and the drawing Svermere I. Olsen died on 1 October 2026, at the age of 101.
