= Rains =

Rains may refer to:

== People ==
- Rains (surname)

== Places ==
- Rains, South Carolina, an unincorporated community in Marion County, South Carolina
- Rains County, Texas, a county in East Texas
- Rains, Utah, a ghost town

== Music ==
- Rains (band), an American rock band formed in 2000
- The Rains (EP), 2002, by Some Girls

== Industry ==
- Rains (brand)

== See also ==
- Rain (disambiguation)
- Raines (disambiguation)'
- Rainsville (disambiguation)
