= Raintown =

Raintown may refer to:

- Raintown (album), by Deacon Blue
- Raintown, Indiana, an unincorporated community in Hendricks County
- Raintown, West Virginia, an unincorporated community in Pocahontas County

== See also ==
- Rainton, North Yorkshire, England, UK
- Rain (disambiguation)
- Rain City (disambiguation)
- Rainville (disambiguation)
- Rainberg (Austria)
