= Raines (disambiguation) =

Raines is a seven-episode American police procedural television show.

Raines may also refer to:

== People ==
- Annie Raines (born 1969), American musician
- Cristina Raines (born 1952), American former actress and model
- Ella Raines (1920–1988), American film and television actress
- Franklin Raines (born 1949), American business executive
- George Raines (1846–1908), American lawyer and politician
- Hazel Jane Raines (1916–1956), American pioneer aviator and flight instructor
- Howell Raines (born 1943), American journalist, editor, and writer
- John Raines (1840–1909), American lawyer and politician
- Marke Raines (1927–2020), Canadian politician
- Mikayla Raines (1995–2025), American animal rescuer, wildlife rehabilitator and YouTuber
- Ron Raines (born 1949), American actor
- Ronald T. Raines (born 1958), American chemical biologist
- Steve Raines (1916–1996), American television and film actor
- Thomas Raines (1842–1924), American lawyer and politician
- Tim Raines (born 1959), American professional baseball coach and former player
- Tim Raines Jr. (born 1979), American former professional baseball outfielder
- Tony Raines (born 1964), American professional stock car racing driver

=== Characters ===
- Audrey Raines, from the American action drama television series 24
- Beth Raines, from the American soap opera The Guiding Light
- Cid Raines, from the science fantasy role-playing video game series Final Fantasy XIII
- Letty Raines, from the American drama television series Good Behavior
- Lilly Raines, from the 1993 American political action thriller film In the Line of Fire
- Randall "Memphis" Raines, from the 2000 American action heist film Gone in 60 Seconds
- Reno Raines, from the American television series Renegade
- William Raines, from the American action drama television series The Pretender

== Other ==
- Raine's Foundation School, a Church of England voluntary aided school
- Raines Corner, West Virginia, an unincorporated community in Monroe County, West Virginia, United States
- Raines law, the New York State liquor tax law of 1896 authored by the New York State Senator John Raines
- Raines v. Byrd, a United States Supreme Court case
- Raines, Tennessee, a suburb on the southern boundary of Memphis, Tennessee

== See also ==
- Rain (disambiguation)
- Raine (disambiguation)
- Rayne (disambiguation)
- Reign (disambiguation)
- Rein (disambiguation)
