= Rainville =

Rainville may refer to:

== People ==
- Earl D. Rainville, mathematician, professor at the University of Michigan
- Joseph Hormisdas Rainville, Canadian lawyer
- Henri-Benjamin Rainville, Canadian lawyer, politician and Speaker of the Legislative Assembly
- Martha Rainville, US general
- Michel Rainville, Canadian Soldier

== Places ==
- Rainville, Vosges, France
- Rainville, Suriname
- Rainville, Quebec, Canada

== Companies ==
- Rainville Inc., a plastics company

== See also ==
- Rain (disambiguation)
- Raintown (disambiguation)
- Rain City (disambiguation)
- Rainberg, Austria
- Rainsville (disambiguation)
- Rainvillers, France
- Renville (disambiguation)
