= Snark subreddits =

Subreddits dedicated to gossip about public figures

Snark subreddits are user-created communities on the social platform Reddit (known as subreddits) created to gossip about and express frustration toward, or "snark" on, public figures, largely female influencers such as YouTubers and TikTokers. Members of snark subreddits are known as "snarkers".

Some snark subreddits, such as r/Blogsnark, r/NYCinfluencersnark and r/LAinfluencersnark, discuss influencers in general, while others focus on particular individuals or families. "Fundie" snark subreddits—such as r/DuggarsSnark, which discusses the Duggar family of the TLC show 19 Kids and Counting—include discussions on Christian fundamentalist influencers and often consist of ex-fundamentalists.

Snark subreddits have been criticized, both by critics and by their targets, as a form of cyberbullying and as invasive of their subjects, often getting details wrong, and engaging in harassment that targets women. However, they have also been commended by some for their analysis of deceptive practices by influencers.

== Subreddits ==
The subreddit r/Blogsnark was created in 2015 to discuss influencers and bloggers, with threads dedicated to subsections of influencers like family channels, food influencers, and podcasters. In March 2020, it rose 300 spots on the list of the subreddits with the most members; its membership more than doubled from 2020 to 2022, by which point it had more than 100,000 members. Geoff Weiss of Business Insider described it as "arguably the most popular" snark subreddit in 2023. r/NYCinfluencersnark focuses on discussions of New York City-based influencers and had over 95 thousand members by 2024, while r/LAinfluencersnark covers Los Angeles-based influencers. r/munchsnark, a subreddit surrounding influencers that members accused of faking their illnesses, was banned for violating Reddit's rule against promoting hate.

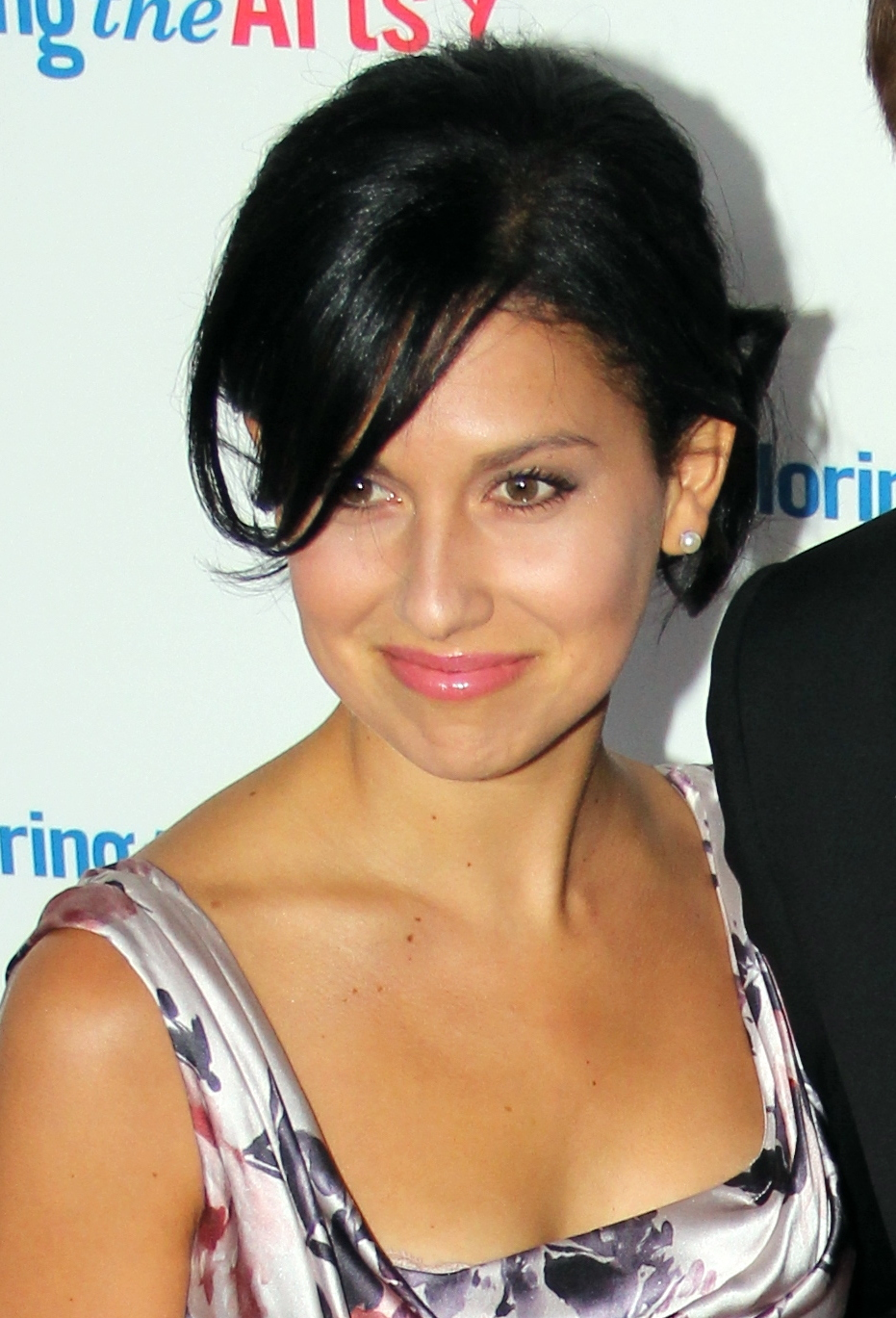
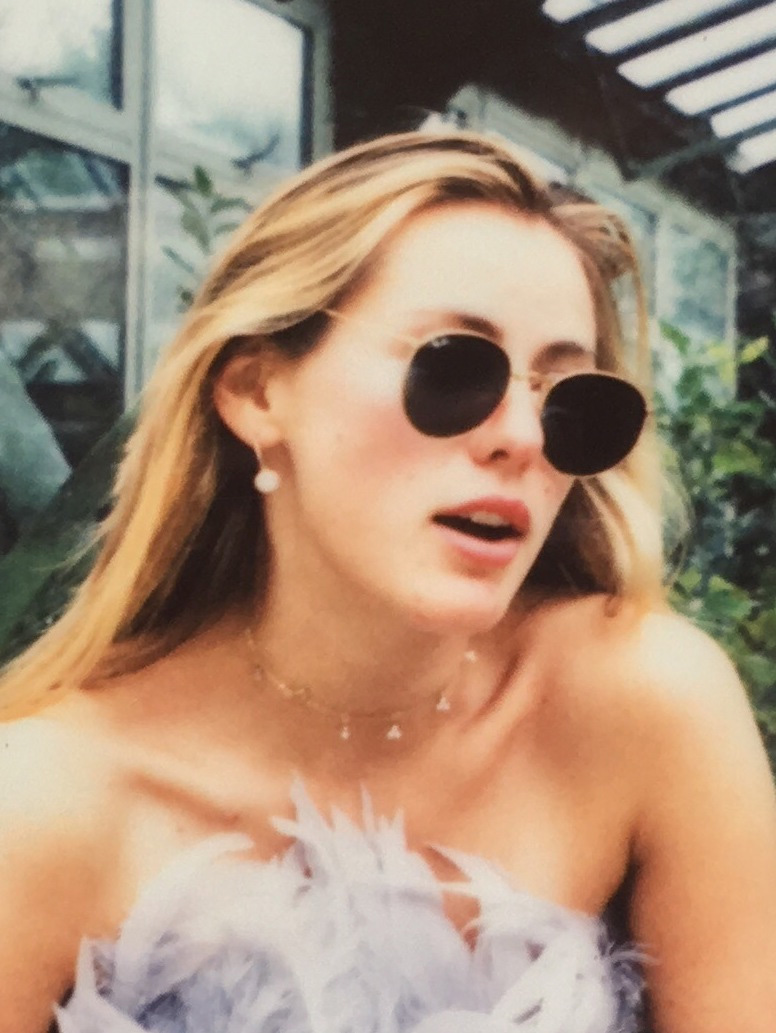
Some popular snark subreddits target specific influencers and media figures, such as Hilaria Baldwin for r/HilariaBaldwin or Caroline Calloway for r/SmolBeanSnark.

r/SmolBeanSnark focuses on writer Caroline Calloway and provides updates on her life and career. They also, as of 2024, organize meetings and create crafts based on their dislike of Calloway. r/HilariaBaldwin focuses on Hilaria Baldwin, the wife of actor Alec Baldwin, and promotes theories that Baldwin is lying about her life. A snark subreddit for influencer Trisha Paytas, r/Trishyland, was created in October 2021, soon after her exit from her collaborative podcast with Ethan Klein, Frenemies. It had over 42,000 members by 2022, with its membership doubling after Paytas announced that she was pregnant. After an article by Kat Tenbarge examining the subreddit's harassment of Paytas was published in 2022, Reddit banned r/Trishyland.

r/sevdaelasnark focuses on food TikToker Sevda Ela. In 2023, food influencer Tieghan Gerard criticized r/foodiesnark users for speculating about her mental health and personal life.

r/MadiaSnark was a subreddit about Brianna Madia, a Moab, Utah–based vanlife influencer. In March 2023, Madia posted a video describing how she was doxxed by users from the subreddit and stated that the subreddit made her suicidal. She then released the names of 25 snarkers from the subreddit and revealed her discovery in October 2021 that her then-husband, Keith, had posted in r/MadiaSnark. It was later taken down by moderators of the subreddit. Lifestyle influencer Lily Chapman posted a series of videos about her experiences with snark content about her in 2024, in which she stated that she had nine separate snark pages dedicated to her and that they prompted her to pursue legal action. The subreddit r/snarkingonthesnarkers was created to critique other snark subreddits for bullying and harassment.

In 2025, The New York Times reported on a snark subreddit dedicated to Sydney Towle, which analyzed many details of her posts under the false belief that she was faking cancer or was a "cancer scammer", and leveraging her claim of having cancer for financial gain and sympathy. This included creating a 28-page timeline purporting to show inconsistencies in her story of having cancer. The New York Times confirmed her diagnosis of stage 4 cancer with her oncologist at Memorial Sloan Kettering Cancer Center, and the subreddit was banned after The New York Times contacted Reddit.

Following the suicide of Mikayla Raines in June 2025, Reddit users raised discussions regarding the role of snark subreddits in her death. A snark subreddit about her YouTube channel SaveAFox was set to private and appeared to be scrubbed following her death. Users also initiated a petition requesting that Reddit introduce stricter policies around hateful content and shut down snark communities. Her death also sparked general discussions on cyberbullying and its effect on mental health.

=== r/DuggarsSnark and fundie snark ===
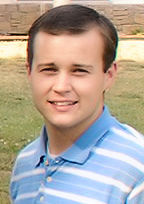
r/DuggarsSnark, which was created to "snark" on the fundamentalist Baptist Duggar family of 19 Kids and Counting, became especially active when Josh Duggar (pictured), known as "the Pest" therein, was tried for child sexual abuse in 2021.

r/DuggarsSnark is a subreddit surrounding the Duggar family, the stars of the TLC reality television series 19 Kids and Counting. Posts often revolve around the family's fundamentalist Baptist beliefs, their promotion of purity culture, and members' negative experiences growing up or interacting with Christian fundamentalism. The subreddit became particularly active during a December 2021 trial against Josh Duggar, whom the subreddit nicknamed "the Pest", for possessing child pornography. The subreddit grew from 8,000 members at the beginning of 2021 to 135,000 by December, while its posts shifted toward empathy for victims of child sexual abuse. The subreddit also organized a fundraiser for the Children's Safety Center of Washington County.

By June 2023, the subreddit had over 174,000 members. Its popularity also led to the proliferation of other snark subreddits for "fundie"—a pejorative for Christian fundamentalist—influencers. r/FundieSnarkUncensored was started in 2020. It had over 169,000 members and was in the top one percent of subreddits by membership by December 2023. J.D. and Britney Lott, the parents of eight children who posted on the Instagram account @americanfamilyroadtrip about their cross-country road trip, were frequent subjects of posts on r/FundieSnarkUncensored in 2024.

== Response and criticism ==
For The Guardian, Katy Kelleher wrote that, despite occasional commentary on snark subreddits about "the expectations that are placed upon women living in 21st-century America", "snarkers" are typically "just mean". Emily Courter of Business Insider wrote that users of r/Blogsnark sometimes expressed admiration for influencers, but that the subjects of its posts were "often heavily criticized and arguably even trolled, which leads to concerns that these spaces have gone too far". Business Insider also faced online controversy in late 2023 for posting a story about the underwear brand Parade in a snark subreddit from their Reddit account. For The Washington Post, Taylor Lorenz described "the vast network of snark subreddits" as "a thorn in [Reddit's] side" in 2023 due to their being "tied to stalking, doxing, and mob behavior" and for "frequently devolv[ing] into networked harassment against women".

For NBC News, Kat Tenbarge wrote that, even if snark subreddits about "entire genres of influencers" like family channels and beauty YouTubers tended to be "more nuanced, newsy and speculative", snark subreddits about specific people could "often turn hateful". She also described r/Trishyland as "a coordinated harassment campaign" due to its members' attempts to involve themselves in Paytas's personal life while she was pregnant. Molly McAleer, a cofounder of HelloGiggles, stated that snark subreddits about female influencers were "less about accountability and more about bullying, often over their target's appearance". Annie Rauwerda wrote for Input that, because "gossip triggers the brain's reward circuitry", there could be "positive, pro-social outcomes of shared snark", but that it had the potential to "go too far". She particularly criticized aspects of r/DuggarsSnark as being "invasive and cruel" and likened them to cyberbullying. Alex Sujong Laughlin of Defector wrote that snark subreddits were "a newer expression of a basic fan impulse" which revolves around the belief that "influencers don't deserve the fame, money, or opportunities they have" rather than "a quirk of latter-day celebrity". She also questioned snarkers' fervent commitment to their subjects' lives, writing, "If you look like a fan, move like a fan, and talk like a fan—at what point are you actually just a fan?"

Feven Merid of the Columbia Journalism Review wrote that, though snark subreddits "are not well moderated", "often get details wrong", and have posts that "sometimes engage in body shaming and bullying", snark subreddits are "often the only places taking a close inspection of how the [influencer] industry and its most successful figures operate". She added that they contain "dozens of threads" about influencers' deceptive posts and practices, expose how influencers earn money, and "can inform readers about online trends that they may not have realized were likely paid influencer campaigns", which allows Redditors to play "a role that mainstream journalists so far haven't been able, or willing, to." For Fast Company, Eve Upton-Clark wrote that snark subreddits "have rightfully called out influencers for shady sponsorship deals or undisclosed ads", pointing to a post from r/NYCinfluencersnark examining how influencers earn money as an example. Sophie Hayssen of Mother Jones wrote that subreddits like r/FundieSnarkUncensored could "play a key role in helping [ex-fundamentalists] reexamine their past beliefs", but that they could sometimes "go too far, moving from critique to bullying".

Outside of Reddit, forums such as Get Off My Internets, Lipstick Alley, and Tattle Life have also been described as snark communities.

== See also ==
- Controversial Reddit communities
