= Belmont Park Village =

Shopping mall in Elmont, New York

- Location: Elmont, New York, United States
- Coordinates: 40°42′25″N 73°43′34″W
- Address: 2601 Hempstead Turnpike
- Opened: October 16, 2024; 2 years ago
- Owner: Value Retail
- Architect: JRDV Urban International
- Floor area: 340,000 sq ft (32,000 m^{2})
- Parking: 1,450 spaces
- Public transit: Elmont–UBS Arena; Nassau Inter-County Express: n6 New York City Bus: Q2, Q82
- Website: www.belmontparkvillage.com

Belmont Park Village is an open-air outlet center on the grounds of Belmont Park thoroughbred horse racetrack in Elmont, New York, just east of New York City limits. It is located on the south side of Hempstead Turnpike (Route 24), next to the Cross Island Parkway and opposite UBS Arena. Belmont Park Village is owned by Value Retail, the same developer of Bicester Village in Oxfordshire, England.

== Description ==
Upon completion, the 340,000-square-foot (32,000 m^{2}) outlet center will contain over 150 stores. Boutiques include A.P.C., AllSaints, Aquazzura, Billy Reid, Boggi, Boss, Canali, Citizen Company Store, Charles Tyrwhitt, Coach, CurrentBody, Farm Rio, Fusalp, Gianvito Rossi, G-Star, Janie and Jack, Jacob Cohën Milano, John Varvatos, Kiton, Kurt Geiger, Lacoste, Levi's, L’Occitane, Longchamp, lululemon, Missoni, Monica Vinader, Neuhaus, Orlebar Brown, PAIGE, Peserico, Rains, Rag & Bone, Reiss, Rene Caovilla, Roller Rabbit, Samsonite, Solaris, Sunglass Hut, Swarovski, The North Face, Thom Browne, TUMI, TWP, Valentino, Vivienne Westwood, and Zadig&Voltaire.

Plans for the opening of a retail village at the site were included as part of a project to redevelop Belmont Park along with a new arena for the New York Islanders (UBS Arena) and a 250-room hotel. The soft opening for the outlet center was on October 16, 2024. Hundredfold, a restaurant by chef Timothy Hollingsworth, opened at Belmont Park Village in July 2025.

Parking is available in Belmont Park Garage, a six-level structure containing 1,450 spaces, which is located at the north entrance to the outlet center and shared with UBS Arena. Shuttle buses operate between Belmont Park Village and the Elmont–UBS Arena station on the Long Island Rail Road. The outlet center is also served by three bus routes: the n6 route operated by Nassau Inter-County Express that stops along Hempstead Turnpike and the Q2 and Q82 routes operated by New York City Bus that terminate at Belmont Park Racetrack/UBS Arena.

== See also ==
- Broadway Commons
- Green Acres Mall
