= Raine (surname) =

Raine is a surname, and may refer to:

- Adam Raine (gridiron football) (born 1999), British-American football player
- Adrian Raine (born 1954), British psychologist
- Allen Raine, pseudonym of Welsh novelist Anne Adalisa Beynon Puddicombe (1836–1908)
- Angelo Raine (1877–1962), British cleric, antiquarian and archivist
- Barnaby Raine (born 1995), English historian
- Ben Raine (born 1991), English cricketer
- Craig Raine (born 1944), English poet
- David Raine (born 1937), English footballer
- David Francis Raine (1948–2004), Bermudan educator and writer
- Elizabeth Raine (died 1842), Australian educator
- Frederick Raine (1821–1893), German-American newspaper editor and diplomat
- Gillian Raine (1926–2018), British actress and singer
- Henry Keyworth Raine (1872–1934), British portraitist
- Jack Raine (1897–1979), English actor
- Jackson Raine (born 1974), Australian actor
- James Raine (antiquary) (1791–1858), English historian
- James Raine (Chancellor) (1830–1896), British antiquarian and ecclesiast
- James Raine (footballer) (1886–1928), English footballer
- Jessica Raine (born 1982), English actress
- Jonathan Raine (1763–1831), English barrister, judge and politician
- June Raine (born 1952), British pharmacologist
- Kathleen Raine (1908–2003), English poet
- Lauren Raine, American artist
- Laurie Raine (1925–2011), Australian rules footballer
- Lena Raine (born 1984), American composer
- Mary Raine (1877–1960), Australian businesswoman
- Matthew Raine (1760–1811), English schoolmaster and cleric, brother of Jonathan Raine
- Moses Raine (born 1984), English playwright and screenwriter, son of Craig Raine
- Nancy Greene Raine (born 1943), Canadian skier
- Naomi Raine (born 1987) is an American Christian and gospel singer and songwriter
- Nina Raine, English theatre director and playwright, daughter of Craig Raine
- Norman Reilly Raine (1894–1971), American screenwriter
- Randy Raine-Reusch (born 1952), Canadian musician
- Richard Raine (1923–2006), pseudonym of British novelist Raymond Harold Sawkins
- Rosalind Raine, British public medicine doctor
- Samantha Raine, English ballerina and dance teacher
- Suzanne Raine (born 1970), British Foreign Office civil servant and academic
- Tom Raine, co-founder of Raine & Horne
- Walter Raine (1874–1938), British politician
- William MacLeod Raine (1871–1954), British-born American novelist
- Willy Raine (born 1970), Canadian alpine skier

== See also ==
- Rainer (surname)
- Raines (surname)
- Rainey
- Rainier (name)
- Rayne (surname)
- Rayner (surname)
- Raynes
