= Rain City =

Rain City may refer to the following cities:

- Manchester, UK.
- Seattle, USA.
- Rasht, Iran.
- Vancouver, Canada.
- Pittsburgh, USA.
- Bogor, Indonesia.
- Taiping, Perak, Malaysia.
- Keelung, Taiwan.

== See also ==
- Rain City (band)
- Rain City Superhero Movement
- Nicknames of Vancouver
- Trouble in Mind (film)
- Rain (disambiguation)
- Raintown (disambiguation)
- Rainville (disambiguation)
- Rainberg (Austria)
