= Raine =

Male or female given name and family name

Raine is a given name and surname derived from any of several personal names (such as Raymond or Lorraine). Notable people with the name include:

== Given name ==
- Raine Allen-Miller (born 1989), English film director
- Raine Baljak (born 1996), Filipino-Australian model
- Raine Karp (born 1939), Estonian architect
- Raine Loo (1945–2020), Estonian actress
- Raine Maida (born 1970), Canadian musician and vocalist
- Raine Nuutinen (1931–2012), Finnish basketball player
- Raine Peltokoski, Finnish sport shooter
- Raine Seville (born 1986), Jamaican dancehall and reggae artist
- Raine Spencer, Countess Spencer (1929–2016), British socialite and politician
- Raine Storey (born 1995), Canadian artist
- Raine Tuononen (born 1970), Finnish ice hockey player

== Surname ==
- Raine (surname)

== Fictional characters ==
- Nicholas Raine, from the video game Rage 2
- Aldo Raine, from the film Inglorious Basterds
- Raine Whispers, from the animated series The Owl House

== See also ==
- Rain (disambiguation)
- Raines (surname)
- Rainey, a surname
- Raein, an Italian screamo band
- RAINN, Rape, Abuse and Incest National Network
- Rane (disambiguation)
- Rein (disambiguation)
- Reine, Norway
- Reign (disambiguation)
- Rayne (disambiguation)
