= Rains (surname) =

Rains is a surname, and it may refer to:

- Albert Rains (1902 – 1991), American politician from Alabama
- Ashleigh Rains, Canadian actress
- Claude Rains (1889 – 1967), American actor
- Dan Rains (born 1956), American football player
- Darby Lloyd Rains (born 1948), American adult-film actress
- Dominic Rains (born 1982), Iranian-American actor
- Ed Rains (born 1956), American basketball player
- Emory Rains (1800 – 1878), American lawyer, judge and politician from Texas
- Ethan Rains, Iranian-American actor
- Euclid Rains, American politician
- Fred Rains (1860 – 1945), British actor and film director
- Gabriel J. Rains (1803 – 1881), American soldier
- Gene Rains, American jazz musician
- George Rains
- Jack Rains (born 1937), American lawyer and politician from Texas
- James Edwards Rains (1833 – 1862), American lawyer and soldier
- James S. Rains (1817 – 1880), American soldier
- Lyle Rains, American video-game developer and businessman
- Michael Rains, American criminal defense attorney
- Omer Rains (born 1941), American politician, lawyer, author, eco-entrepreneur and humanist from California
- Rob Rains, American sports journalist
- Traver Rains (born 1977), American TV personality, fashion designer, and photographer

== See also ==
- Raines (surname)
