= Rein (disambiguation) =

Reins are items of horse tack, used to direct a horse or another animal used for riding or driving.

Rein may also refer to:

== People ==
- Rein (given name), a list of people with the given name or nickname
- Rein (surname), a list of people

== Other uses ==
- [Walking] reins, a British name for a child harness
- Iwakura Rein, a character in of Serial Experiments Lain
- JAC Rein, a compact sport utility vehicle produced by Chinese automaker JAC Motors
- Rein Abbey, Austria
- Rein Abbey, Norway
- Rein orchid or Piperia, a genus of the orchid family Orchidaceae
- Reins, an archaic term for kidneys
- Repetitive electrical impulse noise (REIN), some interference found on problematic DSL internet connections

== See also ==
- Mark Rein·Hagen (born 1964), Georgian-American role-playing game designer
- Raine, a given name and a surname
- Raein, an Italian screamo band
- RAINN, Rape, Abuse and Incest National Network
- Rain (disambiguation)
- Rane (disambiguation)
- Rayne (disambiguation)
- Reign (disambiguation)
