= Rayn =

Rayn may refer to:

- Rhine, a river in Europe
- Rayn (Jak and Daxter), a character in the Jak X: Combat Racing video game
- Rayn Smid (born 1992), South African rugby union player
- French rendition of Rann, the German name of the town of Brežice

== See also ==
- Rayns
- Rayne
