= EmuDX =

Emulator for playing genuine arcade games

EmuDX was the first publicly released emulator for playing genuine arcade games with remade graphics, music, and sound effects. Since the emulator used the actual ROM images, the game-play stayed true to the arcade original. The emulator was originally entitled PacDX, and emulated the Midway arcade version of Pac-Man. It was later renamed EmuDX when support for more games was added. Although EmuDX has been recently resurrected and new versions are in the works for both android and HTML5 (canvas) based devices. Mike Green aided the Raine team with adding the EmuDX content packs to their emulator.

== Compatibility ==
The last publicly released version of EmuDX (version 1.0) supports the following games:

Donkey Kong
Frogger
Galaxian
Ms. Pac-Man
Pac-Man
