= Rane =

Rane may refer to:

== People ==
- Rane (surname), a list of people
- Rane (given name), a list of people with the given name or nickname

== Companies ==
- The Rane Group of Companies, an Indian industrial conglomerate
  - Rane (Madras), involved in the manufacture and distribution of steering and suspension systems
  - Rane Engine Valve Limited, a manufacturer of valves and valve train components for various engine applications
- Rane Corporation, an American pro audio equipment manufacturer

== Arts and entertainment ==
- Rane (English: The Wounds), a 1998 Serbian film
- title character of Elf Princess Rane (妖精姫レーン, Yōsei Hime Rēn), an anime OVA directed by Akitaro Daichi
- Charles Rane, protagonist of the 1977 film Rolling Thunder
- Rane (band), an American pop jam band

== Other uses ==
- Råne River, Sweden

== See also ==
- Ranes (disambiguation)
