= Rayne =

Rayne may refer to:

== Places ==
- Rayne, Essex, England, UK
  - Rayne railway station
- Rayne, Aberdeenshire, location of the parish church held by the Archdeacon of Aberdeen in Scotland, UK
- Rayne, Louisiana, U.S.
  - Rayne High School
- Rayne Township, Pennsylvania, U.S.

== People ==
- Rayne (surname)

=== Men ===
- Rayne (footballer) (born 1997), Brazilian footballer
- Rayne Johnson, American country music singer
- Rayne Kruger (1922–2002), South African author and property developer
- Rayne Prescott (born 1993), American professional football player
- Rayne Storm (born 1983), American rapper and producer

=== Women ===
- Rayne Fisher-Quann (born 2001), Canadian writer and cultural critic
- Rayne Leat (born 1998), English professional wrestler
- Rayne Pegg, American administrator
- Rayne Rouce, American physician scientist and rapper

=== Fictional characters ===
- Rayne (BloodRayne), the protagonist of BloodRayne
- Rayne Royce, the character of Hollyoaks
- Rayne Summers, the protagonist of Least I Could Do

== Other ==
- Rayne (shoe company), British manufacturer and retailer of shoes

== See also ==
- Tha' Rayne, musical group
- The Pilgrims of Rayne, the eighth installment on The Pendragon Adventure
- Rain (disambiguation)
- Raine (disambiguation)
- Raein, an Italian screamo band
- RAINN, Rape, Abuse and Incest National Network
- Rane (disambiguation)
- Rein (disambiguation)
- Reine, Norway
- Reign (disambiguation)
- Raines (surname)
- Rainey, a surname
- Rayner (disambiguation)
