= Jason Nash =

American YouTuber (born 1973)

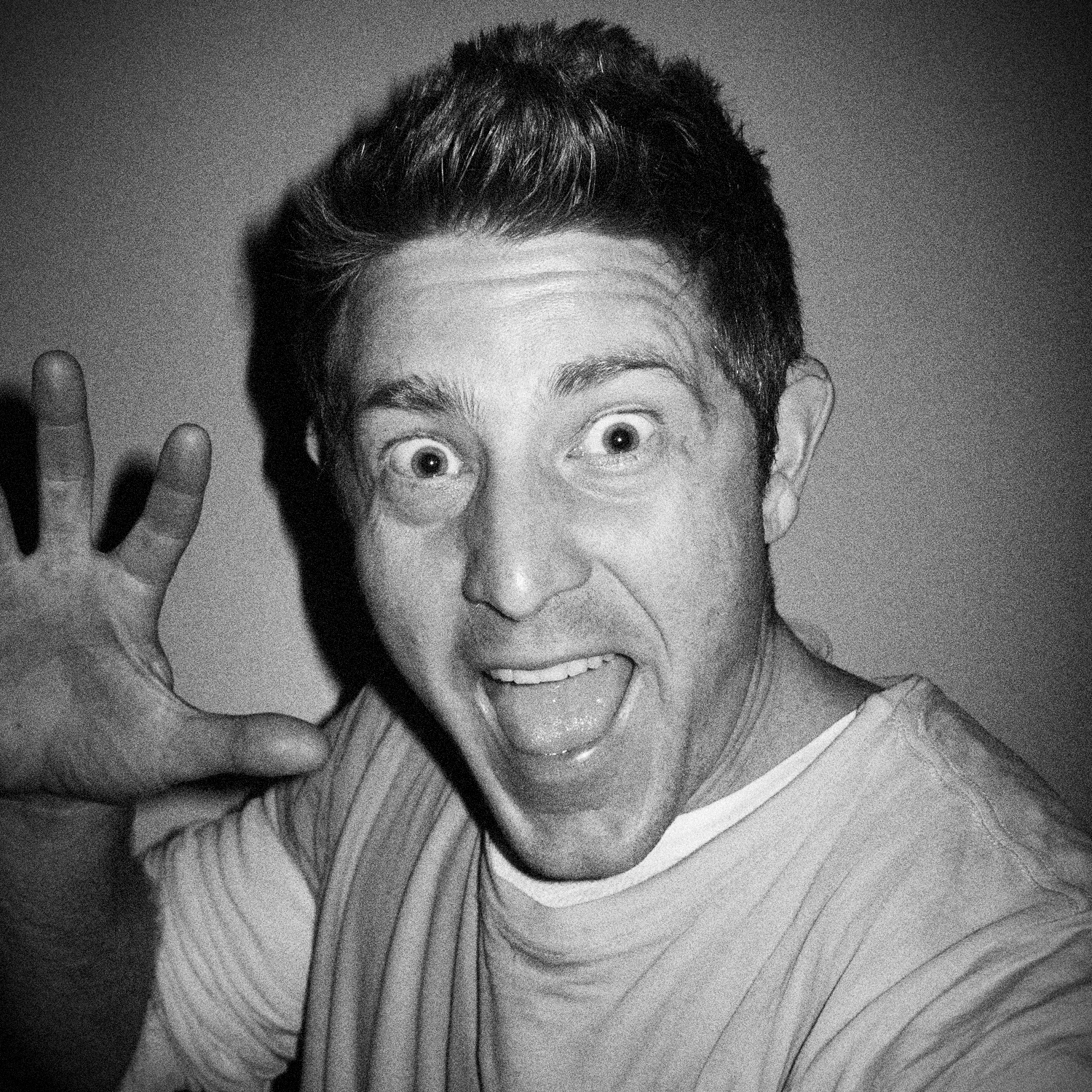
- Nash in 2012
- Born: Jason Eric Nash; May 23, 1973 (age 53); Boston, Massachusetts, U.S.
- Education: University of Massachusetts Amherst
- Occupation: Influencer/Comedian
- Years active: 2000–present
- Spouses: Marney Hochman (m. 2007; div. 2017); Nivine Jay (m. 2024)
- Children: 2

YouTube information
- Channel: Jason Nash
- Subscribers: 2.86 million
- Views: 802 million
- Last updated: April 17, 2026

Jason Eric Nash (born May 23, 1973) is an American comedian and Internet personality. Known for his channel on Vine, he also appeared on Last Comic Standing in 2010. Nash has written, directed, and starred in a pair of films: Jason Nash is Married (2014) and FML (2016). In 2016, he started to appear in David Dobrik's vlogs as a member of "The Vlog Squad" and later started his own YouTube channel.

== Career ==
Born in Boston, Massachusetts, Nash moved to Los Angeles with the aspiration of becoming a comedian. Nash trained with the Upright Citizens Brigade and started his career as a member of the sketch troupe "Price, Nash, and Blieden." The trio was chosen three times to perform at the Aspen Comedy Festival. Nash appeared on the 2010 season of Last Comic Standing, where he finished as a semi-finalist, having been eliminated in the fifth episode. Nash also built a presence on Vine, amassing 2.7 million followers at the time of its discontinuation.

Nash wrote, directed, and starred in a Comedy Central web series Jason Nash Is Married, a film version of which was released in 2014 starring Busy Philipps. Nash also created the web series How to Be a Man and The Shaman. In 2016, Nash starred and directed his own screenplay, a road trip comedy film FML featuring fellow Vine star Brandon Calvillo. According to a 2014 profile by LA Weekly, "Nash had success selling several of his own TV shows, but none made it to air."

Nash is currently a YouTube vlogger with almost 3 million subscribers on his main channel. Nash became a YouTube vlogger after David Dobrik watched his set one night at a comedy club. He began his YouTube career as a character in Dobrik's vlogs and soon began to upload his own videos, the first of which was uploaded on December 2, 2016. Nash's second channel, "Jason Nash Family," was initially dedicated to his life with his children, Charley and Wyatt. This channel was later shut down at the request of the children's mother, who requested that the children not be shown on the internet in such a public way.

Nash co-created the long-running podcast "Guys with Feelings," which debuted in 2006. Dobrik and Nash also hosted a weekly podcast called "Views." During its debut in 2017, "Views" reached number three on the iTunes podcast charts. Dobrik, Nash, and other Vlog Squad members took the podcast on a live tour across the United States in the summer of 2018.

== Personal life ==
Nash graduated from Medfield High School in 1991 and then attended college at the University of Massachusetts Amherst. After he left college, he worked as an assistant to Norm Macdonald on Saturday Night Live. Nash moved to Hollywood in 2001 when he was cast on the sketch show Random Play on VH1.

Nash has two children with his ex-wife, Marney Hochman. He was in a relationship with fellow YouTuber Trisha Paytas from 2017 to 2019. In December 2022 Nash became engaged to his girlfriend Nivine Jay. They got married in 2024.

In February 2021, Seth Francois, a former member of the Vlog Squad, went on The H3 Podcast and told the hosts that he was sexually assaulted by Nash. For one of David Dobrik's pranks, Francois was told that he would be kissing vlogger Corinna Kopf while blindfolded. However, Nash kissed him instead. Francois said that he didn't realize it was sexual assault until later on and called it a traumatizing experience. Nash has not publicly addressed this allegation, but Dobrik briefly apologized to Francois in a YouTube video. Nash has been diagnosed with bipolar disorder.

== Filmography ==
=== Television and film ===
Year	Title	Role	Notes
2000	Batman Beyond	Harold/Bullwhip (voice)	Season 2, Episode 22: "April Moon"
2004	Cheap Seats	Boston Terrier Fan	Season 1, Episode 13: "1990 Dog Show/1990 Cheerleading"
2005	Drake & Josh	Waiter	
2005	Reno 911!	CDC Agent	Season 3, Episode 4: "SARS Outbreak"
2009	House	Process paper server	Season 6, Episode 4: "The Tyrant"
2007–2010	SuperNews!	Multiple characters	
2012	1000 Ways to Die	Harley	
2013	Mad	Roadblock / Stan the Dog / John Cena / Horton the Elephant (voices)	Season 4, Episode 6: "G.I. E.I. Joe / Dog with a Captain's Log"; Season 4, Episode 19: "Pacific Ring / Horton Hears a Whodunnit!"
2014	Jason Nash is Married	Jason Nash	Also writer and director
2016	FML	Sam Douglas	Also writer and director
2016	The Simpsons	Southie Criminals / Philanthropic Southies (voices)	Season 28, Episode 3: "The Town"
2017	Alexander IRL	Mr Eskin	
2019	Liza on Demand	Guest at party	Season 2, Episode 9: "New Year's Eve: Part 1"
2024	The Thundermans Return	Metroburg Police Officer	
