= David Dobrik =

Slovak Internet personality (born 1996)

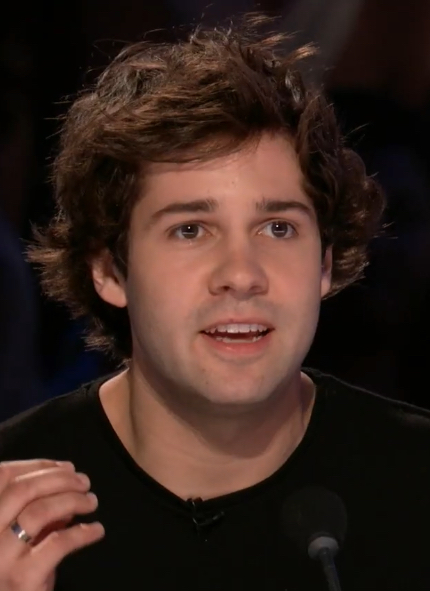
- Dobrik on America's Most Musical Family in 2019
- Born: Dávid Julián Dobrík; 23 July 1996 (age 30); Košice, Slovakia
- Education: Vernon Hills High School
- Occupations: YouTuber; podcaster
- Spouse: Lorraine Nash (m. 2019; div. 2019)
- Partner: Liza Koshy (2015-2018)

YouTube information
- Channel: David Dobrik
- Years active: 2013–2022, 2025–present
- Genres: vlog; comedy
- Subscribers: 17.2 million (David Dobrik); 7.74 million (David Dobrik Too); 1.52 million (VIEWS)
- Views: 7.54 billion (David Dobrik); 1.00 billion (David Dobrik Too); 46.7 million (VIEWS)
- Last updated: 10 June 2026

Dávid Julián Dobrík (/ˈdoʊbrɪk/; Slovak: [ˈdaːvid ˈdɔbriːk]; born 23 July 1996) is a Slovak Internet personality, YouTuber, streamer and vlogger. He amassed a million followers on the video-sharing platform Vine before starting his vlog on YouTube in 2015.

Dobrik is the leader of the YouTube ensemble The Vlog Squad, which features prominently in his vlogs and comprises rotating selections of his friend group. As of 6 July 2022, Dobrik's vlog channel had 19 million subscribers and 7.1 billion views. The channel was the fifth-most viewed creator channel on YouTube in 2019, with 2.4 billion views that year.

Beyond internet entertainment, Dobrik voice-acted in The Angry Birds Movie 2, was one of the judges on the Nickelodeon TV show America's Most Musical Family, and hosted a SpongeBob SquarePants special and the first season of Discovery Channel's reality competition TV show Dodgeball Thunderdome.

== Early life ==
Dobrik was born on 23 July 1996, in Košice, Slovakia, to a Slovak father and a Hungarian mother. His family moved to Vernon Hills, Illinois, when he was six years old. He attended Vernon Hills High School, where he played tennis. He qualified for the 2014 Boys Tennis State Tournament, where he lost his first round match. After graduating from high school, he moved to Los Angeles to pursue his Vine career.

== Career ==
=== 2013–2016: Vine and YouTube beginnings ===
In 2013, Dobrik uploaded his first video onto Vine. He collaborated on Vines with other popular Viners such as Liza Koshy, Gabbie Hanna, Jason Nash, and Zane & Heath. Before starting his own YouTube channel, Dobrik was part of the YouTube group Second Class. Dobrik launched his self-titled YouTube channel in 2015.

In August 2016, Dobrik created his second channel, David Dobrik Too, where he posts blooper reels, challenge videos, and his more direct sponsorship deals.

Vine shut down on 17 January 2017, forcing Dobrik to move his future videos to YouTube.

=== 2017–2022: YouTube career ===
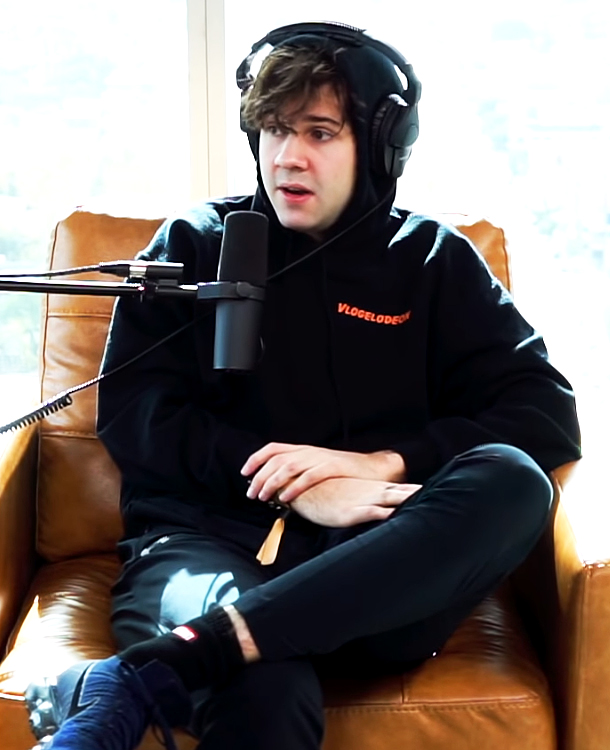
Dobrik being interviewed on the ADHD Podcast in 2018

Dobrik posts videos which consist of pranks, inside jokes, cute animals, former Vine and YouTube stars, real celebrities, which he previously posted three days a week and are currently posted two days a week. In December 2018, Dobrik was given a Diamond Play Button by YouTube in recognition of his YouTube channel surpassing 10 million subscribers. Dobrik was also named one of the "10 Social Media Personalities Making the Most Noise" for 2018 by Paper magazine.

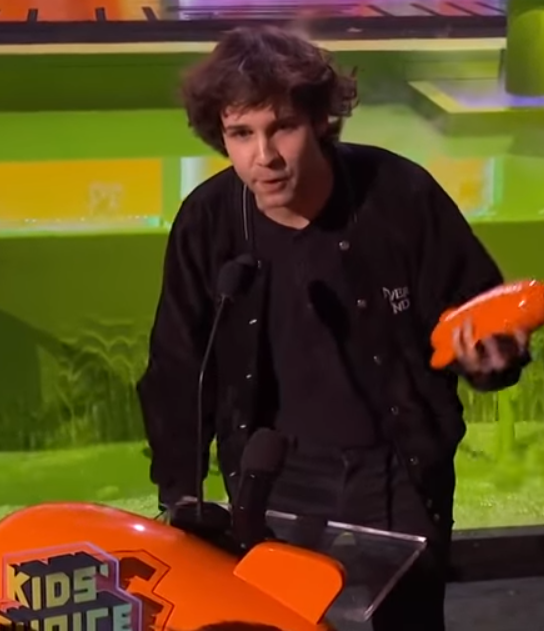
Dobrik at the 2019 Kids' Choice Awards

In July 2019, Dobrik was featured by W among others for being part of a trend of creating a separate Instagram account dedicated to their photos taken with the use of films or disposable cameras.

In August 2019, Dobrik was featured by Variety magazine in their annual "Power of Young Hollywood" list. In the same month, Dobrik co-hosted the 2019 Teen Choice Awards with Lucy Hale, himself receiving the award for Choice Male Web Star. Dobrik also competed in the first-ever Kids' Choice Sports Championship.

In October 2019, Dobrik was ranked the most popular media personality among teenagers based on a survey by the Piper Jaffray & Co.

In November 2019, People magazine named Dobrik Sexiest Heartthrob of 2019, over runners-up including Harry Styles and Shawn Mendes. That same month, Dobrik was one of the presenters at the American Music Awards of 2019, and was also a guest judge in the first episode of the ninth season of Chopped Junior.

In December 2019, Dobrik was named in YouTube Rewind 2019 as the fifth-most-viewed creator that year on the platform, with 2.4 billion views. Also that month, a video of Dobrik's on TikTok featuring a large-scale elephant's toothpaste experiment was named the Number 1 Top Viral Video on the platform in 2019, with 17.5 million likes and 180 million views.

Dobrik also appeared on The Tonight Show with Jimmy Fallon as his late-night television debut, discussing about his inspiration for his viral videos and successful YouTube channel as well as his first interaction with Justin Bieber. Dobrik's appearance on the show alongside Martin Short and Yola was credited for the show being ranked as the #1 most-social late-night series of the week, amassing 2.2 million Interactions across Facebook, Instagram, and Twitter, up +582% according to Nielsen Social Content Ratings. The show was tied for first place for the late-night ratings week of 20 January through 24 in the key demographic of adults aged 18 to 49, as well as adults aged 18 to 34, and won the week outright versus its competition in all key adult-female demographics according to Nielsen Media Research. The show also ranked first across all entertainment brands in total and new views for the week with five videos featuring Dobrik totaling more than 15 million views.

In April 2020, Dobrik was ranked, for the second time in a row, the most popular media personality among teenagers based on a survey by the Piper Jaffray & Co.

In August 2020, Dobrik became one of the first 19 recipients of TikTok's $1 billion Creator Fund due to "his ability to show what it means to be your authentic self, bring joy and inspiration to people and creatively connect with an audience," according to Vanessa Pappas, general manager of TikTok US. Dobrik became the host of a reality competition television show on the Discovery Channel called Dodgeball Thunderdome with Erin Lim and Andrew Hawkins as his co-hosts. Dobrik also plans to evolve his David's Disposable App into a full-fledged social media network which aims to conceive the next great social media network built on authenticity. Dobrik officially joined Twitch to launch his own streaming channel. His initial live stream peaked at 47,233 concurrent viewers according to the analytics tool SullyGnome, and his channel gained 201 thousand followers total.

In September 2021, Dobrik signed with streaming platform Discovery+ for a travel series called Discovering David Dobrik which began streaming in November 2021. Just three of the ten episodes initially planned for the first season were aired, and the show’s second season was later canceled.

==== Vlog Squad sexual assault allegations ====
In February 2018, Dobrik vlogged a meeting between his friend Brandon Calvillo (an adult Vlog Squad member) and Lacy James (a 17-year-old minor at the time). While the couple, Brandon and Lacy, have later denied it was a date, the vlog is titled "CRASHING MY BEST FRIENDS DATE WITH A GIRL!!" and captioned with "I go with Brandon on one of his first Dates with a new girl that he really likes." Dobrik asked the minor "Is Brandon good at sex?" which the minor replied "honestly yes." YouTube comments on Dobrik's vlog about the minor's age were deleted. The vlog on Dobrik's YouTube channel is now private.

In February 2021, Seth Francois, a former Vlog Squad member, accused Dobrik of sexual assault after being deceived into kissing Jason Nash while blindfolded. Being the only black member of the Vlog Squad, Francois stated he also felt "pressured to participate in bits that [came] off culturally insensitive." Former Vlog Squad member Nik Keswani accused Dobrik of bullying and described their friend group as "kind of like a cult," negatively affecting his mental health and leading him to officially quit his association with them in 2018.

On 16 March 2021, Kat Tenbarge at Business Insider reported that during the filming of a 2018 vlog about group sex, a woman was allegedly raped during filming by then-Vlog Squad member Dom Zeglaitis while drunk and unable to consent. On the same day, Dobrik released a short video on his Views Podcast channel titled "Let's talk", in which he addressed some of the recent controversies related to him, specifically in regards to former members of the Vlog Squad. He did not specifically address the allegations against Zeglaitis from earlier that day. After the allegations, Dobrik lost numerous sponsors and fans, and also stepped down from his position at Dispo.

On 26 March 2021, it was reported that YouTube had temporarily demonetized Dobrik's and Zeglaitis's channels over the incident, citing violations of its creator responsibility policy. After a three-month hiatus, Dobrik began posting again to his YouTube channel in July 2021.

==== Dobrik injuring Jeff Wittek lawsuit ====
In April 2021, Vlog Squad member Jeff Wittek released a documentary on his YouTube channel titled Don't Try This at Home. The documentary explained the circumstances of an accident that happened in June 2020, when Wittek broke his skull and face, requiring major surgery. The incident occurred during a video shoot for Dobrik's comeback vlog when the Vlog Squad went wakeboarding in a shallow lake while being pulled by Dobrik using an excavator. Wittek's documentary included video showing fellow Vlog Squad member Corinna Kopf swinging from the line but starting to lose balance and nearly falling, prompting her to ask to be released. Dobrik did not immediately do so, causing her to accuse him of "taking things too far". When it was Wittek's turn, Dobrik swung him higher than anyone before him and then suddenly stopped. The momentum of Wittek continuing to swing around caused him to crash into the excavator and fall into the shallow lake while still attached to the line.

Wittek has since filed a lawsuit in $10 million worth of damages to Dobrik, regarding "general negligence and intentional tort".

=== Vlogging career ===
In a July 2019 profile, The Verge wrote of Dobrik's vlog: "Think of it like Friends, but for vloggers. Essentially, Dobrik created the first sitcom-vlog. There are musical transitions, a returning cast of characters that drive the story forward, and Dobrik's laughter acts as a laugh track for viewers. We know when to laugh because Dobrik does, and it all has to do with his friends' antics." In that same profile, writer Julia Alexander noted Dobrik's editing style for bringing Vine's quick-cut style format to YouTube. "It led to a wave of creators who copied him," she wrote, "many of whom continue to shape the site's content today."

==== Cast ("The Vlog Squad") ====
Dobrik's vlogs feature a recurring group of friends who collectively comprise "The Vlog Squad". Because the cast is, at its core, a friend group, membership in the cast of the vlogs is amorphous. Generally, people considered part of the Vlog Squad include Jason Nash, Natalie Mariduena, Josh Peck, Zane Hijazi, Heath Hussar, Mariah Amato, Scotty Sire, Ilya Fedorovich, Nick Antonyan and his siblings Vardan and Suzy, Matt King, Toddy Smith, Corinna Kopf, Joe Vulpis, Carly Incontro and Erin Gilfoy.

Because the cast of the vlogs samples Dobrik's larger friend group, membership rotates on an ongoing basis. Former or infrequently-featured members include Gabbie Hanna, Liza Koshy, Trisha Paytas, Nik Keswani (known as BigNik), Dom Zeglaitis, Seth Francois, Brandon Calvillo, Elton Castee, Kristen McAtee and Alex Ernst.

Speaking at the 2019 Streamy Awards, Dobrik said of winning the Ensemble Cast prize with the Vlog Squad, "Ensemble is like, my favorite one to win... [The nominations are] insane, and I can't say this enough—it's all because of these guys," he added. "I have a group of like, 15, 20, 30 friends, and they help me day in and day out with all the videos."

== Other ventures ==
In 2019, Dobrik became a judge in a musical competition on Nickelodeon titled America's Most Musical Family, alongside Ciara and Debbie Gibson.

In January 2020, Dobrik launched the mobile camera app Dispo. As of January 2020, the app had surpassed a million downloads and had landed briefly at the top of the list for most popular free apps on Apple's App Store, sitting ahead of Disney+ and Instagram as well as winning a spot on Apple's curated "Apps We Love Right Now" list.

In October 2020, Dobrik launched his fragrance brand David's Perfume with Flower Shop Perfumes Co. He partnered with HeadCount to give five fans a chance to win one of five Tesla 3 models to encourage voter registration via the nonprofit HeadCount's website. This partnership has surpassed their goal of 200,000 voters registered for the 2020 election, hitting a grand total of 300,000 and counting. Later on, the New York-based organization was able to count nearly 120,000 people registered leading for it to be the single largest voting drive in the 16-year history of HeadCount, which has worked with many celebrities, mostly musicians such as Billie Eilish and Ariana Grande.

In November 2020, People magazine named Dobrik Sexiest YouTube Star of 2020 over runners-up including Donal Skehan and Korean Englishman's Josh Carrott and Ollie Kendal. That same month, Dobrik was one of the presenters at the American Music Awards of 2020.

In December 2020, Dobrik was featured as honoree in the Forbes 30 Under 30 list for the year 2021 under the social media category. Dobrik was also named by Forbes as one of the highest-paid YouTube stars of 2020. That same month, Dobrik, alongside Keke Palmer, hosted a year-end special called "Peace Out 2020" on Facebook Watch which highlights memorable moments and memes from the year 2020.

In January 2021, Spotify tapped Dobrik to narrate Mary Shelley's Frankenstein, one of a dozen such celebrity partnerships to bolster their audiobook programming.

In November 2022, Dobrik opened a pizza restaurant, Doughbrik's Pizza, in Los Angeles. He has since revealed that he plans to create a reality TV show based around the employees’ day-to-day lives working in Doughbrik's Pizza.

=== Podcast ===
Views with David Dobrik & Jason Nash is hosted by Dobrik and Jason Nash. Its first episode was released on 15 May 2017, and it debuted second on iTunes chart in podcast section. As of September 2026, there have been 401 episodes.

In September 2018, Dobrik created his third YouTube channel, Views Podcast, where he posts the video version of his podcast. Dobrik was credited by The Verge for successfully integrating the podcast genre onto YouTube, which is an otherwise video-focused platform.

== Personal life ==
Dobrik has three younger siblings. As a Slovak citizen who arrived in the United States as a child and remained illegally, Dobrik is protected from deportation under DACA. However, in September 2021, Dobrik revealed in a vlog that he had obtained his green card and could now travel outside the United States. Dobrik said that he understands both Hungarian and Slovak, but does not speak or write either language fluently.

Dobrik dated fellow YouTube personality Liza Koshy from late 2015 to early 2018. They revealed their break-up in June 2018. On 15 May 2019, Dobrik legally married Lorraine Nash, Jason Nash's mother, as a comedic bit for one of his vlogs. On 12 June 2019, Dobrik announced that he and Nash had decided to end their marriage after one month. On 22 November 2019, Dobrik stated via Instagram that he had officially signed divorce papers and divorced Nash.

== Filmography ==
=== Film ===
Year	Title	Role	Notes	Ref.
2015	An Interrogation	David Baker	Short film; main role	
2016	FML	Taylor Mackey	Supporting role	
2019	Airplane Mode	Himself	Supporting role	
2019	The Angry Birds Movie 2	Axel	Voice role	

=== Television ===
Year	Title	Role	Notes	Ref.
2019	2019 Kids' Choice Sports	Himself	Competitor	
2019	2019 Teen Choice Awards	Himself	Co-host	
2019	America's Most Musical Family	Himself	Judge	
2019	Chopped Junior	Himself	Guest judge (12 November 2019)	
2020	Graduate Together: America Honors the High School Class of 2020	Himself	Guest	
2020	#KidsTogether: The Nickelodeon Town Hall	Himself	Guest	
2020	The Stars of SpongeBob Fan Favorites Special	Himself	Host	
2020	Nickelodeon's Unfiltered	Himself	Episode: "Avocado Toasted Piñatas!"	
2020	Dodgeball Thunderdome	Himself	Host	
2021	Discovering David Dobrik	Himself		

=== Podcast ===
Year	Title	Role	Ref.
2017–Present	VIEWS with David Dobrik & Jason Nash	Host	

=== Music videos ===
Year	Song	Artist	Role	Director	Ref.
2017	"Sad Song"	Scotty Sire	Himself	80Fitz	
2017	"My Life Sucks"	Scotty Sire	Himself	80Fitz	
2017	"Gucci Bands"	Dom Zeglaitis	Himself	Richard Selvi	
2018	"Take Me Away"	Scotty Sire	Himself	Danny Erb	
2018	"David's Haunted House"	Scotty Sire	Himself		
2018	"Cozy"	Trisha Paytas	Himself	Andrew Vallentine	
2019	"Graduation"	Benny Blanco and Juice Wrld	Ryan	Jake Schreier	
2020	"25 Christmas Trees"	Scotty Sire	Himself	Juliana Accetone	
2021	"Mood Swings"	Scotty Sire	Himself	Scotty Sire	

== Awards and nominations ==
Year	Award	Category	Nominee(s)	Result	Ref.
2017	Shorty Awards	Vlogger of the Year	Himself	Won	
2017	Streamy Awards	Breakout Creator	Himself	Won	
2017	Streamy Awards	Creator of the Year	Himself	Nominated	
2018	Shorty Awards	YouTuber of the Year	Himself	Nominated	
2018	Shorty Awards	YouTube Ensemble	Vlog Squad	Won	
2018	Shorty Awards	Best Podcast	VIEWS with David Dobrik and Jason Nash	Won	
2018	Streamy Awards	Creator of the Year	Himself	Nominated	
2018	Streamy Awards	First Person	Himself	Won	
2018	Streamy Awards	Best Podcast	VIEWS with David Dobrik and Jason Nash	Nominated	
2018	Streamy Awards	Collaboration	"FEARBOX Challenge" (with Jennifer Lopez)	Nominated	
2018	Streamy Awards	Ensemble Cast	David's Vlog	Won	
2018	Streamy Awards	Directing	Himself	Nominated	
2019	Kids' Choice Awards	Favourite Social Star	Himself	Won	
2019	Shorty Awards	YouTuber of the Year	Himself	Nominated	
2019	Teen Choice Awards	Choice Male Web Star	Himself	Won	
2019	Teen Choice Awards	Choice YouTuber	Himself	Nominated	
2019	Streamy Brand Awards	Brand Engagement	Chipotle + David Dobrik	Won	
2019	Streamy Brand Awards	Brand Engagement	David Dobrik x SeatGeek: Becoming a Member of the VlogSquad	Nominated	
2019	Streamy Brand Awards	Influencer Campaign	Chipotle + David Dobrik	Nominated	
2019	Streamy Brand Awards	Influencer Campaign	David Dobrik x SeatGeek: Becoming a Member of the VlogSquad	Nominated	
2019	People's Choice Awards	Social Star	Himself	Won	
2019	Streamy Awards	Creator of the Year	Himself	Nominated	
2019	Streamy Awards	First Person	Himself	Won	
2019	Streamy Awards	Best Podcast	VIEWS with David Dobrik and Jason Nash	Nominated	
2019	Streamy Awards	Collaboration	"SURPRISING PEOPLE WITH KYLIE JENNER!!" (with Kylie Jenner)	Won	
2019	Streamy Awards	Ensemble Cast	Vlog Squad	Won	
2019	Streamy Awards	Directing	Himself	Nominated	
2019	Streamy Awards	Editing	Himself	Nominated	
2020	Kids' Choice Awards	Favorite Male Social Star	Himself	Won	
2020	Streamy Awards	Creator of the Year	Himself	Nominated	
2020	Streamy Awards	First Person	Himself	Nominated	
2020	Streamy Awards	Collaboration	SURPRISING PEOPLE WITH JUSTIN BIEBER!! (with Justin Bieber)	Won	
2020	Streamy Awards	Podcast	VIEWS with David Dobrik and Jason Nash	Nominated	
2020	Streamy Awards	Brand Engagement	Need for Speed Heat x David Dobrik – Electronic Arts	Nominated	
2021	Kids' Choice Awards	Favorite Male Social Star	Himself	Nominated	
2021	Forbes 30 Under 30	Social Media	Himself	Included	
