= Raynes =

Raynes is a surname. Notable people with the surname include:

- Andrew Raynes (born 1973), English bodybuilder
- E. Peter Raynes, English engineer
- Edward Raynes, British clergyman
- J. A. Raynes (born 1870), English-born American composer and conductor
- John Crawshaw Raynes (1887–1929), English World War I Victoria Cross recipient
- Michael Raynes (born 1987), English footballer
- Thomas Raynes (1835–1914), English cricketer
- William Robert Raynes (1871–1966), English politician
- Raynes (band)

== See also ==
- Rayne (surname)
- Raines (surname)
