= Rane (given name) =

Rane is a given name and nickname. It may refer to:

- Rane Khan (died 1788), Bhishti Muslim chief in the Maratha empire
- Rane Arroyo (1954–2010), American poet, playwright and scholar of Puerto Rican descent
- Rane Jonsen (died 1294), Danish esquire known for his role in the murder of Eric V of Denmark
- Rane Willerslev (born 1971), Danish anthropologist
- Ramón Rane Arroyo (1954–2010), American playwright, poet and scholar
- nickname of Rauno Korpi (born 1951), Finnish ice hockey coach
