= Rane Engine Valve Limited =

- Type: Public company
- Traded as: BSE: 532988, NSE: RANENG
- Industry: Automotive
- Founded: 1959
- Founder: Lakshmana Iyer Lakshminarayan
- Headquarters: Chennai, India
- Key people: L. Ganesh (Chairman); K Murali Rajagopalan(President)
- Products: Engine valves, valve guides and tappets
- Operating income: ₹26.27 billion (US$270 million) (FY2012-13)
- Total assets: ₹25.108 billion (US$260 million) (2012)
- Parent: Rane Holding Limited
- Website: ranegroup.com/rane-engine-valve-limited/

Rane Engine Valve Limited is a part of Rane Group of companies involved in the manufacture of valves and valve train components for various engine applications. Incepted in the year 1959, it is one of the oldest engine valve manufacturers that caters in the auto industry. The company is headquartered in Chennai and has five manufacturing locations with 1 plant in Chennai, 2 in Hyderabad, 1 in Tumkur and a plant in Tiruchirapalli. It is the largest manufacturer of engine valves in India with an 30% market share.

The company offers its products to companies engaged in the manufacture of passenger cars, utility vehicles, light commercial vehicles, medium and heavy commercial vehicles, farm tractors, and two and three wheelers, typically from motor cycles to marine engines. Volkswagen, Deutz. It recently inaugurated its dedicated Lean Manufacturing Practices (LPS) line for Mahindra and Mahindra's Farm Equipment Sector in its Chennai plant. It also has a dedicated line for manufacturing valves for kappa engines of Hyundai motor.

The company has an Export market. About 30% of its turnover comes from export and the export markets include Europe, North America, and the Far East. The company was all ready to set up an Export-oriented unit (EOU) near Visakhapatnam, but the plan was dropped later.

== History ==
Rane group of companies was founded by Shri T. R. Ganapathy Iyer in the year 1929 and the group was originally named as Rane Madras (Ltd). It started off as a distributor of automobiles and parts. After his death, the business was taken over by his son-in-law Lakshmana Iyer Lakshminarayan, popularly known as LLN, among friends and business circles. Under the leadership of LLN, the company was shaped into an auto-component business house. LLN remained as the founder chairman of the group for over three decades.

Early History

The company was incorporated in 1954 in Chennai. The main objective of the company is to manufacture of valves for internal combustion engines and ATE valves for Mercedes-Benz. It started with a technical collaboration with Farnborough Engineering Company Ltd. that lasted for over a decade till 1973. The valves are to be marketed under the trade name "EVL". In 1959, it established the first IC engines valve plant in chennai. In the year 1973, the company entered into a technical collaboration agreement with Kar Valves Ltd. (formerly Cochin State Power & Light Corpn. Ltd.), for the export of technical know-how and assistance for the manufacture of valves for internal combustion engines.

Recent

Rane Engine Valve Limited was formed after Engine Valves Limited (EVL) was merged with its 100% subsidiary Engine Components Ltd (ECL) in the year 1999. The reverse merger, effective from FY99 is expected to benefit the new entity, reducing its tax liability, because of the carry forward losses of ECL. Rane Engine Valve Limited now has a more diversified product portfolio, absorbing the products of the 2 merging companies. It manufactured guides for internal combustion engines, engine camshafts and tappets, all catering to the automobile industry. The company is the largest manufacturer of engine valves in India with an 85% market share. The company was taken over by RANE HOLDINGS LIMITED and it was delisted from Bombay Stock Exchange on 15 February 2008.

Today, the company has five plants. The plants in Alandur (Chennai), Medchal (Hyderabad), Aziz Nagar (Hyderabad) and Trichy are involved in the manufacture of Engine Valves and the plant in Ponneri (Chennai)is involved in the manufacture of Guides and Tappets.

== Awards and recognition ==
- The company was awarded ISO 14001 certification from RWTUV, Germany, for its environment management policy and systems in all its five manufacturing locations in the year 2002.
- The company received the QS 9000 certification from RWTUV, Germany in 2000.
- It also has ISO/TS 16949-2002 and ISO/TS 16949:2009 awarded during the years 2004 and 2010 respectively.
- Wins the Volkswagen Group Best Supplier Award for 2008.
- Awarded the Best in Class Performance in Quality PPM award by Ashok Leyland during the year 2010–11
- Awarded Pancharatna Award for Best Supply Chain Management by Mahindra and Mahindra (2010–11)
- The company received the `Best Supplier Award' from Deutz AG of Germany.
