= Renville =

Renville may refer to:

== Places in the United States ==
- Renville, Minnesota
- Renville County, Minnesota
- Renville County, North Dakota
- Renville Township, Bottineau County, North Dakota

== People ==
- Joseph Renville
- Gabriel Renville

== Other ==
- USS Renville (APA-227)
- Renville Agreement

== See also ==
- Rainville (disambiguation)
