= Reign (disambiguation) =

A reign is the period of time a monarch rules.

Reign may also refer to:

== Television ==
- Reign (TV series), a 2013 American historical drama
- Reign: The Conqueror, a 1999 Japanese anime
- Reign (Arrowverse), a supervillain in the DC Arrowverse media franchise
  - "Reign" (Supergirl episode)

== Comics ==
- Spider-Man: Reign, a comic book limited series
- Reign (DC Comics), a supervillain

== Music ==
- "Reign" (song), 2002, by Ja Rule
- "Reign", a 2003 song by Unkle from Never, Never, Land
- "Reign", a 2013 song by Joey Badass from Summer Knights
- "Reign", a 2014 song by Lagwagon from Hang
- "Reign", a 2016 song by Chris Quilala from Split the Sky
- The Reign (album), 2017, by Hinder
- Reign (album), 2018, by Shatta Wale

== Sports ==
- Ontario Reign (ECHL), a California hockey team
- Portland Reign, a 2004 American Basketball Association team in Oregon
- Seattle Reign FC, a National Women's Soccer League team in Washington, US
- Seattle Reign (basketball), a women's team in the 1996–1998 American Basketball League
- Atlanta Reign, an American esports team in the Overwatch League

== Other uses ==
- Eva Reign (born 1996), American actress and journalist
- Reigns (video game), a 2016 strategy game developed by Nerial
- Reign (drink), an American energy drink

== See also ==
- Rain (disambiguation)
- Raine (disambiguation)
- Rane (disambiguation)
- Rein (disambiguation)
- Rayne (disambiguation)
- Roman Reigns (born 1985), American professional wrestler and former football player
- Reigne, a 2001 album
