= Kat Tenbarge =

American journalist

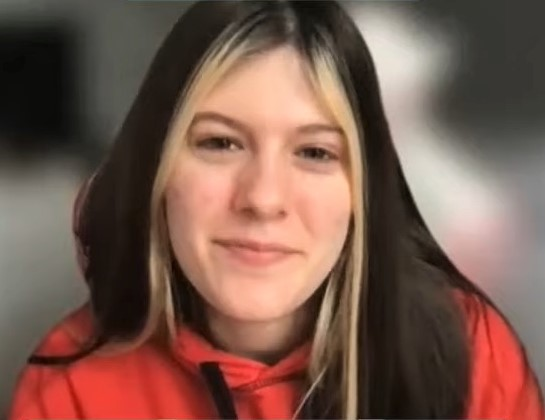
- Tenbarge interviewed in 2022
- Born: 1997 (age 28–29)
- Education: Ohio University
- Occupation: Journalist
- Spouse: Anna Iovine (m. 2026)

Kat Tenbarge (born 1997) is an American independent journalist. She previously worked as a senior reporter at Insider and later as a tech and culture reporter for NBC News. She specializes in reporting on internet culture and influencers, including her own views and commentary. Tenbarge has reported on several cases of sexual assault allegations against Internet personalities, and her work and views concerning internet culture are frequently cited in other publications.

== Early life and education ==
Tenbarge studied journalism at Ohio University, where she was also the editor-in-chief of one of the school's student publications, The New Political. While at Ohio University, she majored in environmental studies and journalism, winning regional first place in news reporting from the Society of Professional Journalists in 2017. She received a $4,000 grant from the White House Correspondents' Association the same year.

== Career ==
In October 2020, Tenbarge reported on sexual assault allegations against Jeffree Star, after she was approached with the allegations by the accuser unprompted. In January 2021, she reported on allegations of grooming against YouTuber CallMeCarson.

On March 26, 2021, Tenbarge reported on the alleged rape of a woman in 2018 during the filming of a video by David Dobrik. The incident was reported to have taken place while the woman was inebriated, and was allegedly committed by Dom Zeglaitis, who was at the time a member of Dobrik's Vlog Squad. The woman had agreed to work with Tenbarge, who said that she had been waiting for an outlet that would allow her anonymity. This report resulted in widespread backlash against Dobrik, including the withdrawal of support from several sponsors of his YouTube channel, and ultimately resulted in him stepping down from his position at Dispo.

On December 2, 2021, Tenbarge announced on social media she would be a tech and culture reporter for NBC News. As an NBC News reporter, she reported on the charging of Justin Roiland with felony domestic battery and false imprisonment in Orange County, California, in connection with an alleged incident in 2020. She also reported on Amber Heard, Elon Musk, Kanye West, Angelina Jolie, Andrew Tate, the Russo-Ukrainian War, and other topics.

Tenbarge wrote the Substack newsletter The Kids Aren't Alright. In 2025, Tenbarge was one of 40 people laid off by NBC News. She then began the independent newsletter Spitfire News.

In September 2025, actress Alexa Nikolas filed a lawsuit against Tenbarge over a series of allegedly defamatory statements Tenbarge made online about Nikolas. Nikolas also alleged in her complaint that "Tenbarge facilitated Alexa's stalker's violation of the restraining order issued against him". The lawsuit was filed in the Eastern District of New York. They settled in June 2026 and Tenbarge issued an apology statement on various social media platforms and on her newsletter Spitfire News.

== Personal life ==
In 2025, Tenbarge got engaged to fellow journalist Anna Iovine. They married on October 24, 2026 at the Cincinnati Art Museum.
