= Dispo =

Online photo sharing and social networking service

- Developers: Dispo, Inc.
- Release: December 21, 2019; 6 years ago
- Operating system: iOS
- Available in: English; Japanese
- Website: dispo.fun

Dispo (formerly David's Disposable) is an American photo sharing and social networking app owned by Dispo, Inc. and co-founded by CEO Daniel Liss, YouTuber David Dobrik, and Natalie Mariduena. When the app initially launched on iOS in December 2019, it briefly charted as the most downloaded free app on the App Store, ahead of both Disney+ and Instagram. The app was rebranded and relaunched as Dispo, expanding from a simple camera app to a full social network in March 2021. It is based on the disposable camera.

== History ==
On December 21, 2019, the app was first launched on the App Store under the name "David's Disposable." In its first week of release, it was downloaded more than a million times, reaching number one among free apps in the App Store.

In June 2020, the team decided to rename the app to Dispo, purchasing the Dispo.fun domain on June 21, 2020. The company announced the change in September 2020. The early Dispo team consisted of Dobrik's longtime friend and business associate Natalie Mariduena as its treasurer, entrepreneur and venture capitalist Daniel Liss as chief executive officer, Regynald Augustin as first engineer, and Briana Hokanson as lead designer.

In October 2020, the company raised a $4M seed round with backing from Alexis Ohanian's venture fund Seven Seven Six alongside other investors including Unshackled Ventures, Shrug Capital, and Weekend Fund.

In February 2021, Axios reported that the app had generated US$20 million in its series A round, led by Spark Capital. At this time, the app was valued at US$200 million. A New York Times profile asked, "Are Disposables the Future of Photosharing?"

In March 2021, the app was officially relaunched with new social network features and its invite-only feature was dropped.

On March 21, 2021, it was announced that Spark Capital would sever all ties with Dispo in light of several disparaging allegations against David Dobrik and The Vlog Squad. The same day, it was announced that Dobrik would leave the company and step down from the company's board of directors. On March 22, 2021, Seven Seven Six and Unshackled Ventures announced they would be standing by the company and its remaining employees but donating profits to charity.

In June, 2021, CEO Daniel Liss announced Dispo's official Series A. Investors and advisors in the new Dispo include Ohanian's Seven Seven Six, Unshackled, Endeavor, photographers Annie Leibovitz and Raven B. Varona, NBA stars Kevin Durant and Andre Iguodala (through their 35 Ventures and F9 Strategies venture firms, respectively). Other participants include Cara Delevingne, Sofia Vergara, Shade Room CEO Angelica Nwandu, Latin World Entertainment CEO Luis Balaguer, and Amplify Africa co-founders Damilare Kujembola and Timi Adeyeba.

== Overview ==
Dispo has been compared to other image sharing and social networking services, most notably Instagram and VSCO, although users cannot immediately see the photos they have taken using the app. When a user attempts to take a photo, the interface mimics the developing process of a disposable camera. Users can take as many photos on the app as they want; they do not appear on the app however, until 9 am the next day. Once the set of photos appear on the app, users can choose to save them or share them with other users in a "roll".

== Reception ==
Screen Rant has called the app "like Clubhouse [referring to the app] but for photos," comparing the early invite-only features of the apps. As it greatly restricts the user's editing options and sets out to offer a more authentic social networking experience, the app has been widely dubbed the "anti-Instagram".

Between March 2021 and June 2021, the app reached the top ten in the App Store's photo/video rankings on 5 continents including in the US, Japan, Spain, Germany, Brazil, and Australia. It has been a notable success in Japan, where it opened its first international office in July 2021.

In July 2021, NBA number one draft pick Cade Cunningham announced he had selected Dispo as his exclusive social media partner for the NBA draft.
