= Digital telephone electrical interference =

Electrical noise can disrupt DSL internet connections. The interference can be detected as electrical impulses on the physical telephone line on which the internet connection operates. The noise causes interference which in turn causes a DSL modem to mount up CRC errors. This eventually causes DSL synchronisation to drop.

== Type of interference ==
Single High-level Impulse Noise (SHINE): SHINE occurs when a single brief burst of electrical noise interferes with communication lines. It typically manifests as a sharp spike on monitoring tools and can cause line errors or even completely disrupt broadband connections. This kind of interference is often caused by the activation or deactivation of an electrical device, where the noise burst is sufficient to cause a broadband connection to resync.

Repetitive Electrical Impulse Noise (REIN): REIN involves interference from an external power source that impacts ADSL broadband or other telecommunications signals. REIN is particularly problematic as it can cause DSL modems to lose synchronisation and drop connection. While telecommunications signals and external electrical signals usually coexist without issue, certain electrical items can introduce noise in the same frequency bands used by DSL services. This additional noise can overpower the ADSL signal, leading to reduced speeds or total loss of synchronization with the exchange. Notably, all electrical equipment generates some level of noise, but it should comply with Electromagnetic Compatibility (EMC) Directives to avoid interference with radio and telecommunications equipment. Non-compliance due to factors like age, origin, or faults in the equipment can lead to DSL broadband problems.

REIN is often caused by faulty electrical equipment which is in the proximity of the broadband telephone line. Usually the equipment is emitting a radio frequency, which causes electrical impulses along the telephone line.

The cause of the repetitive electrical impulse noise can be traced by using a directional radio frequency analyzer.

Impact of Aging or Non-Compliant Electrical Equipment: Older electrical appliances, especially those not adhering to current EMC Directives, are more likely to cause interference with broadband services. For instance, the incident in Aberhosan (reported by BBC and CNN) involved an old television that, when turned on, emitted electrical interference in the frequency range used by the village’s broadband network, thereby disrupting the service. This highlights the potential for outdated or faulty electrical devices to interfere with modern communication technologies.

General Susceptibility of Broadband Networks to Electrical Interference: Broadband networks, particularly those relying on DSL technologies, are susceptible to various forms of electrical interference. This can include everyday household appliances (e.g., microwaves, outdoor lights, and CCTV cameras. The interference can range from minor disruptions to complete service outages, depending on the strength and frequency of the emitted noise.

== Identification and monitoring of interference ==
Detecting and identifying sources of electrical interference in telecommunications systems, particularly broadband networks, is a critical aspect of maintaining reliable communication services. Various tools and methodologies are employed for this purpose, each playing a specific role in diagnosing and resolving interference-related issues.

A spectrum analyzer is an essential tool used in the identification of electrical interference sources. It measures the magnitude of an input signal across a range of frequencies, facilitating the detection of unknown signals and interference. Spectrum analyzers are used to scan for irregular signal patterns, such as spikes that indicate interference.

Monitoring and graphing tools are utilized to visualize the broadband signal and potential interference. They can display real-time or historical data, enabling the identification of anomalies in signal patterns. These tools are particularly effective in spotting transient events like SHINE, which is summarized above.

Field tests, including walkdowns or walkabouts with portable equipment such as spectrum analyzers, allow engineers to detect interference sources in real-time. This method is especially useful in localizing the source of interference within a specific area.

Pattern analysis involves observing the timing and regularity of network disruptions to identify potential sources. This approach is effective in cases where interference is related to the activation of household appliance or other electrical devices operating on timers.

Collaborative identification, engaging with local residents or users to gather information about the usage of electrical devices can be pivotal in identifying interference sources. This approach is beneficial when dealing with interference from household appliances or other consumer electronics. Note that this, accompanied with other tools and methods described above, led to the successful identification of the incident in Aberhosan (BBC, CNN).
