= Rosalind Raine =

British health care scientist

- Awards: Fellow of the Academy of Medical Sciences; 2020

Academic background
- Education: University College London (BSc, MBBS); London School of Hygiene & Tropical Medicine (MSc, PhD)

Academic work
- Institutions: University College London

Rosalind Raine is a British applied health research scientist, public medicine doctor, professor of health care evaluation and the founding head of the Department of Applied Health Research at University College London (UCL).

She has made major contributions to UK national health policy, particularly around health and health care inequalities and on service effectiveness.

== Education and early training ==
Raine holds a BSc in Psychology and an MBBS in Medicine both from University College London (UCL), an MSc in Public Health Medicine and a PhD in Public Health, both from the London School of Hygiene & Tropical Medicine (LSHTM).

She spent her early career training as a Junior Doctor in London, specialising in Public Health and she practiced as an honorary consultant in public health medicine in London between 1998 and 2005.

Raine also worked as an academic in Public Health: she was a Medical Research Council (MRC) Clinical Research Fellow (1997–2001), MRC Clinician Scientist (2001–2005) and then a National Institute for Health and Care Research (NIHR) Public Health Career Scientist (2005–2010). She joined UCL as a professor of health care evaluation in 2005.

== Research career ==
Raine's expertise is in the design and examination of health service/public health interventions and policies, including digital health innovation, and of the determinants of implementation of evidence-based care. She has a particular interest in the measurement of health inequalities and in designing interventions to reduce the social gradient in health. Her research has been implemented nationally and informed the UK Government's health inequalities policies.

She was Chair of UK Heads of Academic Departments of Public Health, 2010–2014; a member of the HEFCE Research Excellence Framework Panel for her specialty (2011–2014), has advised on health policy internationally and regionally and is a member of the Lancet Commission on The Future of the NHS.

Raine was elected a Fellow of the Academy of Medical Sciences in 2020, selected by the British Medical Association as one of 29 national role models in academic medicine and by NIHR as one of the country's leading-edge scientists. She has also been selected as an NIHR Senior Investigator.

She has been involved in grants totalling £120 million, has over 200 publications and an h-index of 41. Key programmes include:

Director of NIHR Collaboration for Leadership in Applied Health Research and Care (CLAHRC) and NIHR Applied Research Collaboration (ARC), North Thames (Europe's largest partnership of world leading applied health and care researchers).

Vice Director of NIHR Policy Research Unit: Cancer awareness, screening and early diagnosis.

== Advisory roles ==
Raine has advised many national and international bodies including:

- NIHR Leadership Programme Advisory Board 2018–2019
- NIHR ‘Push the Pace’ Advisory Board 2016–2017
- Scientific Advisor to Google DeepMind, 2015–2019

== Awards and recognition ==
- Fellow of the Academy of Medical Sciences, 2020
- NIHR Senior Investigator 2017–
- BMA MASC: Nominated as one of 29 national role models in academic medicine 2014
- NIHR Public Health Career Scientist Award, 2005–2010
- MRC Clinician Scientist Fellowship, 2001–2005
- MRC Clinical Research Fellowship, 1997–2001
