= Michael Rains =

American lawyer

Michael Rains is a California criminal defense attorney known for representing police accused of misconduct, including the case of the BART Police shooting of Oscar Grant and a successful defense of the Oakland Riders. Rains also won acquittal of the Corcoran 8, prison guards accused of staging fights amongst inmates. He formerly represented baseball player Barry Bonds who was ultimately exonerated by the 9th Circuit Court of Appeals with respect to a perjury allegation.

Rains is a California State University, Long Beach graduate who served in the Vietnam War with the U.S. Marines. Working as a former Santa Monica police officer, he won a scholarship to attend Golden West University School of Law, and became a member of the California bar in 1979. His law firm, Rains Lucia Stern St. Phalle & Silver, PC, has contracts with over three hundred and fifty public safety labor associations throughout the State of California.

While representing Bonds, Rains brought suit against the San Francisco Chronicle for publishing leaked grand jury testimony, but dropped the suit when threatened with an anti-SLAPP counterclaim.
