= Raines (surname) =

Raines is a surname. Notable people with the surname include:

== People ==
- Annie Raines (born 1969), American musician in the duo Paul Rishell and Annie Raines
- Cristina Raines (born 1952), American actress
- Ella Raines (1920–1988), American actress
- Franklin Raines (born 1949), former Fannie Mae director and White House budget director
- George Raines (1846–1908), New York politician
- Hazel Jane Raines (1916–1956), pioneering American aviator, first woman licensed pilot in Georgia
- Howell Raines (born 1943), former executive editor of The New York Times
- John Raines (1840–1909), New York politician, namesake of the Raines law
- Mikayla Raines (died 2025), American wildlife rescuer, YouTuber and founder of SaveAFox Rescue
- Ron Raines (born 1949), American actor and musician
- Ronald T. Raines (born 1958), American chemical biologist
- Steve Raines (1916–1996), American actor and stuntman
- Thomas Raines (1842–1924), New York State Treasurer
- Tim Raines (born 1959), American baseball player
- Tim Raines Jr. (born 1979), American baseball player
- Tony Raines (born 1964), American racecar driver

== Fictional characters ==
- Audrey Raines, fictional character in the TV series 24, portrayed by actress Kim Raver
- Cid Raines, from the video game Final Fantasy XIII, voiced by Erik Davies
- Letty Raines, fictional character in the TV series Good Behavior, portrayed by actress Michelle Dockery
- Lily Raines, fictional character in the movie In the Line of Fire portrayed by actress Rene Russo
- Memphis Raines, fictional character in the movie Gone in 60 Seconds, portrayed by actor Nicolas Cage
- Detective Michael Raines, fictional character in the TV series Raines, portrayed by actor Jeff Goldblum
- Dr. William Raines, fictional character in the TV series The Pretender, portrayed by actor Richard Marcus
- Reno Raines, fictional character in the TV series Renegade, portrayed by actor Lorenzo Lamas

== See also ==
- Raines (disambiguation)
- Raine (disambiguation)
