= Rainsville =

Rainsville is the name of several places in the United States:

- Rainsville, Alabama
- Rainsville, Indiana
- Rainsville, New Mexico

== See also ==
- Rainville (disambiguation)
