= Rane Arroyo =

American poet, playwright, and scholar

- Born: November 15, 1954; Chicago, Illinois, United States
- Died: May 7, 2010 (aged 55); Toledo, Ohio. United States
- Occupations: Poet, performer, playwright, professor
- Writing career
- Notable work: Pale Ramón
- Notable awards: Carl Sandburg Poetry Prize
- Website: www.ranearroyo.com

Rane Ramón Arroyo (November 15, 1954 – May 7, 2010) was an American playwright, poet and scholar of Puerto Rican descent who wrote numerous books and received many literary awards. He was a professor of English and Creative Writing at the University of Toledo in Ohio. His work deals extensively with issues of immigration, Latino culture, and homosexuality. Arroyo was openly gay and frequently wrote self-reflexive, autobiographical texts. He was the long-term partner of the American poet Glenn Sheldon.

== Biography ==
Rane Ramón Arroyo was born in Chicago, Illinois, to Puerto Rican parents. He began his career as a performance artist in the Chicago art galleries of the 1980s and eventually expanded into poetry, for which he has become best known.

Arroyo earned his Ph.D. in English and Cultural Studies from the University of Pittsburgh where he wrote his dissertation on issues surrounding the "Chicago Renaissance" that parallel the building of a contemporary Latino literary canon. He served as the co-Vice President of the board of directors for the Association of Writers & Writing Programs (AWP) and as the co-chair for the 2009 Chicago Conference.

His last public poetry reading was at SUNY/Brockport on March 31, 2010. His last three words to the public at that reading were: "Live. Then Write." It appears on the electronic version of the DVD Brockport made, in the SUNY Digital Repository https://hdl.handle.net/1951/84065. The quote is at the end of his poem, "The Anonymous Reader" at 38:32. Those three words were words he not only lived by but demanded of his creative writing students.

Arroyo died in the early morning of May 7, 2010 due to a cerebral hemorrhage.

== Critical reception ==
Arroyo was included in the Heath Anthology of American Literature published in 2006; this book is commonly taught in English college classes in the U.S. He won the 2004–05 John Ciardi Poetry Prize for The Portable Famine; the 1997 Carl Sandburg Poetry Prize for his book The Singing Shark; and a 1997 Pushcart Prize for the poem "Breathing Lessons" as published in Ploughshares. Other awards include: Stonewall Books Chapbook Prize; The Sonora Review Chapbook Prize, the Hart Crane Memorial Poetry Prize, and a 2007 Ohio Arts Council Excellence Award in Poetry.

Betsy A. Sandlin published an article on him ("Poetry Always Demands All My Ghosts: The Haunted and Haunting Poetry of Rane Arroyo") in a landmark issue of CENTRO: Journal of the Center for Puerto Rican Studies on Puerto Rican queer studies. Lawrence La Fountain-Stokes has also written about his work.

== Works ==
=== Books of poetry ===
- Columbus's Orphan. Arcadia, Fl.: JVC books, 1993, ISBN 1-878116-17-7.
- The Singing Shark. Tempe, AZ: Bilingual Press, 1996, ISBN 0-927534-61-4.
- Pale Ramón. Cambridge, Mass.: Zoland Books, 1998, ISBN 0-944072-94-1.
- Home Movies of Narcissus. Tucson: University of Arizona Press, 2002, ISBN 0-8165-2195-6.
- The Portable Famine. Kansas City, Mo.: BkMk Press, 2005, ISBN 1-886157-53-7.
- Don Quixote Goes to the Moon, Toronto: Ahadada Books, 2006, OCLC 71388016
- The Roswell Poems. La Porte, Ind.: WordFarm, 2008, ISBN 978-1-60226-001-6.
- Same-Sex Séances. New Sins Press, 2008, ISBN 0-9796956-1-9.
- The Buried Sea: New & Selected Poems. Tucson: University of Arizona Press, 2008, ISBN 978-0-8165-2716-8.
- The Sky's Weight. Turning Point Press, 2009, ISBN 1-934999-73-3.
- White as Silver: Poems. West Somerville, MA: Cervená Barva Press, 2010, ISBN 9780984473229.

=== Book of short stories ===
- How to Name a Hurricane. Tucson: University of Arizona Press, 2005, ISBN 0-8165-2460-2.

=== Performed plays ===
- The Amateur Virgin, Buddha and the Señorita, Tiara Tango, Emily Dickinson in Bandages, A Family in Figleaves, Prayers for a Go-Go Boy, Honeymoon Rehearsals, House with Black Windows (with the poet Glenn Sheldon), Red House On Fire, and Horatio: An Inquisition

=== Published plays ===
- Dancing at Funerals: Selected Plays. Tokio and Toronto: ahadada books, 2010, ISBN 978-0-9812744-4-7.
- Buddha and the Señorita, Sex with the Man-in-the-Moon, Spanish Moon, Bed But No Breakfast, Fade to White (with the poets Glenn Sheldon and Diane Williams), Honeymoon Rehearsals, and A Lesson in Writing Love Letters

=== Awards and honors ===
- 1985 Jane Chambers Playwriting Award. Other Couples: Three One-Act Plays
- 1991 1st Prize, Hart Crane Memorial Award, Kent State University, for the poem "Le Mal de Siam"
- 1992 2nd place, Allen Ginsberg Poetry Award for poem "The Carlos Poems #1"
- 1993 Winner of the George Houston Bass Drama Award, Brown University's Rites and Reason Theater, for the play The Amateur Virgin
- 1993 Winner of the Sonora Review/University of Arizona's National Chapbook Contest for The Red Bed poems
- 1997 Carl Sandburg Poetry Award for The Singing Shark
- 1997 Pushcart Prize for poem, "Breathing Lessons", published in Ploughshares
- 1997 Winner of the Stonewall Books National Chapbook Contest for The Naked Thief
- 1998 Arts Commission of Greater Toledo Individual Artist Grant for "Blood Never Rusts", an experimental story
- 1999 Honorable Mention, Crossing Borders 1999 Contest, Wharf Rat Theater, The Darkness after a Millennium of Blondes
- 2001 Finalist, 7th Annual West Coast Ten-Minute Playwriting Contest "Lord Byron, The God"
- 2001–02 Arts Commission of Greater Toledo Individual Artist Grant for Creative Non-fiction Essay on Toledo, "Glass Words"
- 2004 Finalist for The Ohioana Award for Home Movies of Narcissus
- 2004 Gwendolyn Brooks Poetry Prize/1st Place for Winter Wear (The Immigrants)
- 2004–05 John Ciardi Poetry Prize for the poetry collection, The Portable Famine, included publication
- 2005 Included in the prestigious Heath Anthology of American Literature: Volume E, Contemporary Period: 1945 to the Present (5th Edition)Editor: Dr. Paul Lauter, Houghton Mifflin, 2005: 2989–2995, introductory essay by Dr. Lawrence La Fountain-Stokes (U of Michigan—Ann Arbor)
- 2006 Caesar Chavez Visiting Writer, Saginaw Valley State University
- 2006 ForeWord Poetry Book of The Year Finalist for The Portable Famine
- 2006 Independent Publishers Awards finalist nominee for How to Name a Hurricane
- 2006 Nominated for a Pushcart Prize (by Cream City Review) for What Daniel and I Talk About When We're Naked
- 2007 Included in Contemporary Authors. Also in The Latino Encyclopedia
- 2007 Nominated for a Pushcart Prize (by Poems & Plays) for A Lesson in Writing Love Letters, a one-act play
- 2007–08 Ohio Arts Council Excellence Award in Poetry/State Grant
- 2009 Inducted into the Ohio Center of the Book
- 2009 Nominated for the 15th time for a Pushcart Prize by Saranac Review for The Closet
- 2009 Nominated for the 16th time for a Pushcart Prize by Aperture for "
- 2009 The International Latino Literary Prize: Honorable Mention in Poetry: The Buried Sea: New and Selected Poems

== Legacy ==
In 2012, Seven Kitchens Press announced the creation of the Rane Arroyo Chapbook Prize for an original, unpublished poetry manuscript. The editors for this prize are Dan Vera and Ron Mohring. The co-winners of the inaugural prize were Steven Alvarez and Rhett Watts.

In 2015, Arroyo was inducted into the Chicago Literary Hall of Fame.

== See also ==
- List of Puerto Rican writers
- List of Latin American writers
- List of Puerto Ricans
- Multi-Ethnic Literature of the United States
- American poetry
- LGBT literature
- Puerto Rican literature
