= Peserico =

Italian fashion brand founded 1962

Peserico is an Italian fashion brand founded in 1962 by Maria Peserico in Cornedo Vicentino (Veneto region). The company began as a small workshop crafting premium women’s trousers.

In 1975, Maria Peserico‘s husband Giuseppe Peruffo joined the company, shifting focus toward core brand collections and contract manufacturing for international luxury labels. In the 1980s and 1990s, the company began targeting international markets and scaled up from producing just women’s trousers and skirts to complete wardrobe looks for women. In 2021, Peserico launched its first men's collection.

The Peserico brand is distributed in 1,300 stores worldwide and more than 60 monobrand boutiques.

Peserico is still owned by the founding family. Peserico is managed by Maria's son, Riccardo Peruffo (CEO and Creative Director), alongside his wife, Paola Gonella.
