= Rane (band) =

- Origin: Hartford, Connecticut, Us
- Genres: Alternative rock, Progressive Pop, Jam band, Experimental
- Years active: 1995–present
- Labels: Tides Records
- Members: Alan Veniscofsky; Ryan Bowman; Dan Prindle; Bryan Kelly; Kurt Rinaldi
- Website: http://thesoundofrane.com/

Rane was a progressive pop jam band based in Hartford, CT. The band formed in 1995 and has released eight albums, including a self-titled album not officially recognized as part of the band's discography. The band also created its own record company in 1998, called Tides Records, the same year they released their first full-length album.

== Overview ==
The five member band features:

- Alan Veniscofsky (guitar, vocals)
- Ryan 'Bowman' Bowman (guitar, vocals)
- Dan Prindle (bass, cello, vocals)
- Bryan Kelly (drums)
- Kurt Rinaldi (percussion, marimba)

Previous Members:

- Travis LaMothe (drums)
- Bruce Menard (drums)

== Discography ==
- Magnetic North (2005)
- Telescope EP (2005)
- The Hope Seed (2003)
- From the Vine vol. 1 (2003)
- From the Vine vol. 2 (2003)
- Camelopardalis (2000)
- At War With The Moon (1998)
- Rane (1997)
