= Ranes =

Ranes may refer to:

- Rânes, Orne department, France, a commune
- Ringvassøya or Ráneš, a large Norwegian island
- Larry and Danny Ranes (1945–2023 and 1943–2022, respectively), American serial killer brothers who committed their crimes completely independent of each other
