= Raine Tuononen =

Finnish ice hockey defenceman

- Born: July 7, 1970 (age 54); Kuopio, Finland
- Height: 5 ft 9 in (175 cm)
- Weight: 172 lb (78 kg; 12 st 4 lb)
- Position: Defence
- Shot: Left
- Played for: KalPa
- Playing career: 1990–2002

Raine Tuononen (born July 7, 1970) is a Finnish former professional ice hockey defenceman.

Tuononen played four regular season games and three playoff games for his hometown team KalPa. After leaving KalPa in 1991, he spent the rest of his career in the Finnish lower leagues, including a return to KalPa for the 1999–00 season while they were playing in Suomi-sarja.
