= Rain (disambiguation) =

Rain is a type of precipitation in which liquid drops of water fall toward the surface of the earth.

Rain, The Rain, or RAIN may also refer to:

== Art ==
- Rain (Australian sculpture), a sculpture in Norwood, South Australia
- Rain (sculpture), a sculpture by Jovian in Puerto Vallarta, Mexico
- Rain (Van Gogh), an 1889 painting by Vincent Van Gogh

== Castes ==
- Arain or Rain and Rayeen, a Muslim caste in Pakistan and India
- Rayeen (Hindu) or Rain, a Hindu caste in India

== Fictional characters ==
- John Rain, in novels by Barry Eisler
- Rain Carradine, in the film Alien: Romulus
- Rain Hasumi, from Valkyrie Drive – Mermaid
- Rain Lao, in the film Independence Day: Resurgence
- Rain Mikamura, in Mobile Fighter G Gundam media
- Rain Ocampo, in the film Resident Evil
- Rain Robinson, from the Star Trek: Voyager episode "Future's End"
- Rain (Mortal Kombat), in the Mortal Kombat fighting games
- Rain, a character in the Elfquest comic book series
- Rain, a horse in Spirit: Stallion of the Cimarron
- Rain, in Sword Art Online: Lost Song

== Film and television ==
=== Films ===
- Rain (1929 film), a Dutch short film by Joris Ivens
- Rain (1932 film), a drama starring Joan Crawford; based on the 1921 Somerset Maugham short story
- Rain (2001 New Zealand film), a drama by Christine Jeffs
- Rain (2001 American film), a drama by Katherine Lindberg
- Baran (film) or Rain, a 2001 Iranian film
- Rain (2005 film) or Rain: The Terror Within..., a Bollywood erotic thriller
- Rain (2006 film), a film starring Faye Dunaway
- Rain (2008 film), a Bahamian film starring C. C. H. Pounder
- Rain, a 2013 adaptation of the video game Heavy Rain
- Rain (2020 film), an Estonian film of 2020
- The Rain (film), a 1976 Bangladeshi film

=== Television ===
- TV Rain, a Russian television channel
- Rain (TV series), an Indonesian soap opera musical comedy drama
- "Rain" (CSI: NY), an episode of CSI: NY
- The Rain (TV series), a 2018 Danish Netflix television series
- "Rain" (Bluey), an episode of Bluey
- "Rain", 6th episode of Servant (TV Series)

== Literature ==
- Rain (webcomic), a 2010–2022 slice-of-life webcomic by Jocelyn Samara DiDomenick
- Rain (poetry collection), a 2009 book by Don Paterson
- "Rain" (short story), a 1921 short story by W. Somerset Maugham
- Rain, a 2000 novel by V. C. Andrews
- Rain, a 1994 novel by Kirsty Gunn
- The Rain, a 1988 mystery novel by Keith Peterson

== Music ==
=== Classical music ===
- Rain (opera), an opera by Richard Owen
- Rain, choral composition by Clare Maclean
- Rain, a 2001 ballet by the Rosas Company

=== Groups ===
- Rain (American band), a post-hardcore band
- Rain (British band), a rock band from Liverpool
- Rain (Japanese band), an instrumental rock band
- Rain: A Tribute to the Beatles, a 1975 Beatles tribute band and show
- Rain, a late 1960s California-based group formed by members of The Dartells
- The Rain (Basingstoke band), later Clark Springs, an indie band from Basingstoke, England
- The Rain (Manchester band), a band from Manchester, England, that eventually evolved into Oasis

=== Albums ===
- Rain (EP), a 2000 EP by 40 Below Summer
- Rain (Peter Mulvey album), 1994
- Rain (Joe Jackson album), 2008
- Rain (Sons of Korah album), 2008
- The Rain (album), a 2003 album by Ghazal
- The Rain, a 2009 album by Z-Ro and Chill

=== Songs ===
- "Rain" (Aitch and AJ Tracey song) (2020)
- "Rain" (Anthony Callea song) (2005)
- "Rain" (Beatles song) (1966)
- "Rain" (Breaking Benjamin song) (2005)
- "Rain" (Creed song) (2009)
- "Rain" (The Cult song) (1985)
- "Rain" (Dragon song) (1983)
- "Rain" (Erasure song) (1997)
- "Rain" (Guano Apes song) (1998)
- "Rain" (Madonna song) (1992)
- "Rain" (Man in the Wood song) (1989)
- "Rain" (Mika song) (2009)
- "Rain" (The Script song) (2017)
- "Rain" (Sekai no Owari song) (2017)
- "Rain" (Sid song) (2010)
- "Rain" (SWV song) (1997)
- "Rain" (Soyou and Baekhyun song) (2017)
- "Rain" (Status Quo song) (1976)
- "Rain" (Taeyeon song) (2016)
- "Rain" (Uriah Heep song) (1972)
- "Rain" (Yui song) (2010)
- "Rain (Let the Children Play)", by Marcia Hines from Right Here and Now (1994)
- "Raining" (Six60 song) (2019)
- "The Rain" (Oran "Juice" Jones song) (1986)
- "The Rain (Supa Dupa Fly)", by Missy Elliott (1997)
- "The Rain Song", by Led Zeppelin (1973)
- "Rain", by Bishop Allen from The Broken String (2007)
- "Rain", by Amaranthe from Amaranthe (2011)
- "Rain", by Anjulie from Anjulie (2009)
- "Rain", by Audiovent from Dirty Sexy Knights in Paris (2002)
- "Rain", by Simone Battle (2008)
- "Rain", by Blake Babies from Earwig (1989)
- "Rain", by Brainbug (1998)
- "Rain", by Michael Breen (1987)
- "Rain", by Burst from Prey on Life (2003)
- "Rain", by Chamillionaire from The Sound of Revenge (2005)
- "Rain", by Charon from Songs for the Sinners (2005)
- "Rain", by the Chills from Brave Words (1987)
- "Rain", by Craig David from Commitment (2025)
- "Rain", by Tusse Chiza (2019)
- "Rain", by the Clientele from Suburban Light (2000)
- "Rain", by Concrete Blonde from Mexican Moon (1993)
- "Rain (Jacques)", by Stewart Copeland from The Stewart Copeland Anthology (2007)
- "Rain", by the Corrs from In Blue (2000)
- "Rain", by Terence Trent D'Arby from Introducing the Hardline According to Terence Trent D'Arby (1987)
- "Rain", by Dear Jayne (2007)
- "Rain", by Debbie Harry from Debravation (1993)
- "Rain", by Detroit Grand Pubahs from Funk All Y'all (2001)
- "Rain", by DJ Muggs from Dust (2003)
- "Rain", by E-Type from Loud Pipes Save Lives (2004)
- "Rain", by An Emotional Fish from Junk Puppets (1993)
- "Rain", by Emyli (2003)
- "Rain", by José Feliciano from Feliciano/10 to 23 (1969)
- "Rain", by Fool's Garden from Ready for the Real Life (2005)
- "Rain", by Gackt from Moon (2002)
- "Rain", by Glay from Hai to Diamond (1994)
- "Rain", by Green Carnation from A Blessing in Disguise (2003)
- "Rain", by Patty Griffin from 1000 Kisses (2002)
- "Rain", by Heather Headley from In My Mind (2006)
- "Rain", by Hollywood Undead from Notes from the Underground (2013)
- "Rain", by Issues from Beautiful Oblivion (2019)
- "Rain", by I Prevail from Violent Nature (2025)
- "Rain", by Kiss from Carnival of Souls: The Final Sessions (1997)
- "Rain", by Lord from Ascendence (2007)
- "Rain", by Mac Miller and Vince Staples from Faces (2014)
- "Rain", by Miyeon from My (2022)
- "Rain", by Model 500 from Mind and Body (1999)
- "Rain", by Muse from Newton Abbot Demo (1997)
- "Rain", by Ben Platt (2019)
- "Rain", by Prism from Small Change (1981)
- "Rain", by Project Pitchfork from Black (2013)
- "Rain", by Riot from The Brethren of the Long House (1995)
- "Rain", by S Club 7 from Best: The Greatest Hits of S Club 7 (2015 re-release)
- "Rain", by S.E.S. from A Letter from Greenland (2000)
- "Rain", by Samael from Passage (1996)
- "Rain", by Scream from Fumble (1993)
- "Rain", by the Seatbelts from Cowboy Bebop (1998)
- "Rain", by Siam Shade from Siam Shade II (1995)
- "Rain", by Shadow Gallery from Room V (2005)
- "Rain", by Sleep Token from Take Me Back to Eden (2023)
- "Rain", by Trivium from Ascendancy (2005)
- "Rain", by Uriah Heep from The Magician's Birthday (1972)
- "Rain" (featuring Pusha T), by Keke Wyatt from Ke'Ke' (2014)
- "Rain", from the musical Once on This Island (1990)
- "Rain Song", by Taiji (2000)
- "Raining", by Cocco from Kumuiuta (1998)
- "The Rain", by Akon from Konvicted (2006)
- "The Rain", by Calvin Harris from Ready for the Weekend (2009)
- "The Rain", by Carlene Carter from Little Love Letters (1993)
- "The Rain", by DMX from Grand Champ (2003)
- "The Rain", by God Forbid from Earthsblood (2009)
- "The Rain", by Montell Jordan from Montell Jordan (2002)
- "The Rain", by K-Os from Atlantis: Hymns for Disco (2006)
- "The Rain", by Knocked Loose from Laugh Tracks (2016)
- "The Rain", by Peter Luts
- "The Rain", by Roxette from Tourism (1992)
- "The Rain", by Kate Ryan from Stronger (2004)
- "The Rain", by Lou Rhodes from Bloom (2007)
- "The Rain", by Will Smith from Willennium (1999)
- "The Rain", by Tech N9ne from Everready (The Religion) (2006)

== Organisations ==
- RAIN, a charitable organisation in Bronx, New York, run from Parkchester General Hospital
- Rain (telecommunications), a South African telecommunications company

== People ==
- Rain (given name)
- Rain (entertainer) (born 1982), South Korean pop artist and actor
- Rain (gamer) (born 1994), Norwegian Counter-Strike player
- Rain (wrestler) (born 1981), American wrestler
- Douglas Rain (1928–2018), Canadian actor and narrator
- Gavin Rain (born 1971), South African artist
- Justin Rain (born 1981), Canadian First Nations actor

== Places ==
- Rain, Lower Bavaria, Bavaria, Germany
- Rain, Swabia, Bavaria, Germany
- Rain, Iran, a village in North Khorasan Province, Iran
- Rain, Lucerne, Switzerland
- Rain, Kentucky, an unincorporated community in Whitley County, Kentucky
- Rain, Raebareli, a village in Uttar Pradesh, India

== Other uses ==
- Rain (video game), a 2013 PlayStation game
- Redundant Array of Independent Nodes, a computing architecture

== See also ==
- Raein, an Italian screamo band
- Raine (disambiguation)
- Raines (disambiguation)
- RAINN, Rape, Abuse and Incest National Network
- Rains (disambiguation)
- Rane (disambiguation)
- Rayne (disambiguation)
- Reign (disambiguation)
- Rein (disambiguation)
