= Rane group =

Indian industrial conglomerate

Rane Group
- Founded: 1929; 97 years ago
- Headquarters: Chennai, India
- Website: www.ranegroup.com

The Rane Group is an Indian industrial conglomerate, headquartered in Chennai. Beginning as a dealer for automobile, trucks and auto-parts in Madras in the 1920s, Rane has grown to encompass ten different companies as of 2013.

== Scope ==
According to the company's web site, its sales for fiscal 2012–13 were ₹52.36 billion (US$540 million).

According to The Automotive Horizon the company has "dominat[ed] the domestic [Indian] auto component space" for "decades".

In 2020 the group had manufacturing facilities in Chennai, Puducherry, Hyderabad, Mysore, Tumkur, Pantnagar, Bawal, Trichy, Sanand. and Russellville, Kentucky

== Activities ==
In late 2011 the group entered the defense and aerospace market by purchasing a 26% equity stake in SasMos HET Technologies Pvt Ltd. SasMos manufactures interconnection systems (cable harnesses) for various defence and aerospace purposes. Group chairman L. Ganesh was quoted as saying that he foresaw "significant growth opportunities both in India and as an exporter."

The Rane Group was, as of 2012, planning to establish a manufacturing plant outside India. Group chairman L. Ganesh was quoted as saying: "We think the time has come to look beyond India, to see if there is more space to grow, and, if it makes sense to manufacture there as well. While our Tier-I products will still continue to be made with our joint venture partners, we are studying global markets to see if it’s feasible to manufacture our Tier-II products such as engine valves there." In 2011 the group planned to reinvest around ₹2,392 million, an increase from ₹2,173 million the previous year. However, in September 2013 the group was reported to have scaled back from a planned investment of about ₹2.50 billion to ₹1.30 billion in both the previous and coming fiscal years, because of economic slowdowns.

== Reactions ==
Moneycontrol.com ran a video story about "succession planning" in the Rane Group, and how "dynastic rules" are accepted in Indian business while they are opposed in politics.

== Group Companies ==
- Rane Holdings Limited
- Rane Engine Valve Limited
- Rane (Madras) Limited
- Rane Brake Lining Limited
- Rane Diecast Limited
- ZF Rane Automotive India Private Limited
- Rane Steering Systems Private Limited.
- Kar Mobiles Limited
- JMA Rane Marketing Limited
- Rane Holdings America Inc
