= Raintown, West Virginia =

- Unincorporated community
- Location within West Virginia Location within the United States
- Coordinates: 38°10′38″N 80°13′49″W
- Country: United States
- State: West Virginia
- County: Pocahontas
- Elevation: 2,582 ft (787 m)
- Time zone: UTC-5 (Eastern (EST))
  - Summer (DST): UTC-4 (EDT)
- Area codes: 304 & 681
- GNIS feature ID: 1728146

Raintown is an unincorporated community in Pocahontas County, West Virginia, United States. Raintown is located on state routes 39 and 55, 3 miles (4.8 km) north of Hillsboro.

The community was named after John Raine, a businessperson in the lumber industry.
