= Rain (TV series) =

- Genre: Musical Comedy Drama
- Created by: Amanah Surga Productions
- Starring: Cassandra Lee; Randy Martin; Stefhanie Zamora Husen; Salshabilla Adriani; Endy Arfian; Aldy Rialdy Indrawan; Marsha Aurelia; Kinaryosih; Amel Carla; Arbani Yasiz
- Opening theme: Aku Memilih Setia, Fatin Shidqia
- Ending theme: Aku Memilih Setia, Fatin Shidqia
- Country of origin: Indonesia
- Original language: Indonesian

Production
- Production locations: Jakarta, Indonesia
- Cinematography: Boney Hutabarat
- Running time: One hour (17:00-18:00pm Indonesia West Time)
- Production company: Amanah Surga Productions

Original release
- Network: SCTV
- Release: April 14 – May 13, 2015

Related
- Operation Wedding The Series

Rain is an Indonesian soap opera musical drama that aired on SCTV in 2015. The cast features members of the girl group Elovii, including 14-year-old Cassandra Sheryl Lee as Rain, as well as Stefhanie Zamora Husen and Salshabilla Adriani. The male actors are Randy Martin who plays Farhi and Endy Arfian.

There are also cameo appearances from actors from Indonesian films and television. The series was produced by Amanah Surga Productions.

== Plot ==
The series is about a girl named Rain who dislikes the dry season and a boy called Fahri who likes the summer. They form a friendship chasing rainbows. Then Rain is tragically diagnosed with late-stage thyroid cancer.

== Cast ==
- Cassandra Lee as Rain
- Randy Martin as Fahri
- Salshabilla Adriani as Viona
- Steffi Zamora as Angel
- Endy Arfian as Rangga
- Aldy Rialdy as Syahroni
- Arbani Yasiz as Kelvin
- Amel Carla as Syahreni
- Verlita Evelyn as Luna
- Shandy Syarif as Billy
- Kinaryosih as Indah
- Ari Wibowo as Rafa
- Marsya Aurelia as Venus
- Harlan Chaniago as Komar
- Virgoun Tambunan as Virgoun
- Pretty Asmara as Ani
