= Rane (Madras) =

Auto component manufacturer in Chennai, India

Rane Limited
- Type: Public company
- Traded as: BSE: 532661, NSE: RML
- Industry: Automotive
- Founded: 1929
- Founder: T. R. Ganapathy Iyer
- Headquarters: Chennai, India
- Key people: L. Ganesh (chair); S. Parthasarat(CEO); Gowri Kailasam(president)
- Products: Manual steering gear products and suspension & steering linkage products
- Operating income: ₹67.05 billion (US$700 million) (FY2012-13)
- Total assets: ₹34.102 billion (US$350 million) (2012)
- Parent: Rane Holding Limited
- Website: ranegroup.com/rane-madras-limited/

Rane (Madras) Ltd is a part of the Rane group of companies involved in the manufacture and distribution of steering and suspension systems. The main components manufactured by the company include Manual Steering Gear Products (SGP) and Suspension & Steering Linkage Products (SSLP). The other products include tie rod assemblies, drag link assemblies, center link assemblies and gear shift ball joints. Automobile companies that use its products include Ashok Leyland, Volvo, M&M, Tafe, Tata among many others. Tata motors remains its major customer and is the primary parts manufacturer for Tata's Nano. The company has also set up a dedicated plant for Tata Nano in Sanand, Gujarat. The company was forced to change its manufacturing facility from West Bengal to Gujarat after Tata moved out.

== History ==
Rane group of companies was founded by Shri T. R. Ganapathy Iyer in the year 1929 and the group was originally named as Rane (Madras) Ltd. It started off as a distributor of automobiles and parts. After his death, the business was taken over by his son-in-law Lakshmana Iyer Lakshminarayan, popularly known as LLN, among friends and business circles. Under the leadership of LLN, the company was shaped into an auto-component business house. LLN remained as the founder chairman of the group for over three decades.

During the early periods. Rane Madras Ltd was engaged in trading only. Later in the year 1960, they completely dropped trading and started manufacturing and it all started with the manufacture of Tie Rod ends at their plant in Velachery, Chennai. Later; as the automobile industry flourished, the business spread to the manufacturing of other suspension and steering systems. As a major turn of events, in 2005 the company was de-merged from the group and the group holding company called Rane Holding Ltd (RHL) and several other subsidiary companies were formed. It was during this period that Rane (Madras) Ltd emerged as a public limited company. Later, Rane Holding Ltd made additional investment in the company, and thus Rane (Madras) Ltd became a wholly owned subsidiary of the Rane Holdings Ltd. It remained a major manufacturer and supplier of major OEMs in India and abroad.

Over the years Rane (Madras) Ltd has grown to be the largest in the group, both in terms of size and turnover, with five manufacturing plants in Chennai and Kancheepuram in Tamil Nadu, Mysore in Karnataka, Thirubuvanai in Pondicherry and Pantnagar in Uttarakhand. Each of the company's production plants addresses a specific industry segment. The production facilities in Mysore cater to the tractor and commercial vehicle segment; the Pondicherry plant to the passenger car segment; the plant in Chennai caters to the light commercial vehicle, heavy commercial vehicle and utility vehicle segment; the Kancheepuram plant to the export market and the manufacturing facility in Pantnagar (Uttarakhand) supplies gears exclusively to Tata Motors Ltd. The company has also started setting up its plant in Gujarat

In 2013 this group merged with GTC inc. (Gaurav Jagannath Rane) Director & S.E.O.
