= Rains (brand) =

Danish clothing brand

Rains is a Danish outerwear brand headquartered in Aarhus, Denmark. The brand was founded by Philip Lotko and Daniel Brix in 2012 and its CEO is Steen Borgholm. Rains integrates conceptual design with functional waterproofing and a minimalist, neo-Scandinavian aesthetic, making unisex streetwear fashion pieces from traditional wet-weather gear.

The company’s main products are raincoats, minimalist trench coats, and technical puffer jackets made from a lightweight polyurethane (PU) fabric. Rains also produces water-resistant commuter gear including rolltop rucksacks, laptop sleeves, travel duffels, rain boots, waterproof hats, and travel accessories.

The brand collaborated with Umbro in 2025.

Rains operates 24 retail spaces in Europe and 7 in North America. Its first retail store in Asia opened in Shanghai in HKRI Taikoo Hui in 2026.
