= Mikayla Raines =

American wildlife rehabilitator and YouTuber (1995–2025)

- Raines in June 2025
- Born: Mikayla Anne Raines; March 5, 1995; Burnsville, Minnesota, U.S.
- Died: June 20, 2025 (aged 30); Faribault, Minnesota, U.S.
- Cause of death: Suicide
- Other name: Mikayla Frankamp
- Occupations: Wildlife rescuer and rehabiltator YouTuber
- Years active: 2015–2025
- Spouse: Ethan Frankamp (m. 2020)
- Children: 1

YouTube information
- Channel: Saveafox
- Genre: Animal welfare
- Subscribers: 2.52 million
- Views: 875.6 million
- Last updated: April 16, 2026

Mikayla Anne Raines (March 5, 1995 – June 20, 2025) (Note: While some initial reporting on Raines's death stated she was 29 at the time, later reports from USA Today and The New York Times confirmed she was 30. Sourcing conflicts on her date of death; CBS News cites a video published by her husband as having "announced she died on Saturday [June 21, 2025]". However, USA Today and The New York Times, citing her mother and husband respectively, both report her death-date as June 20.) was an American animal rescuer, wildlife rehabilitator, and YouTuber. Working initially and particularly closely with foxes, she was the founder and chief executive officer (CEO) of Minnesota's SaveAFox Rescue, a nonprofit animal sanctuary organization specializing in rescuing animals from fur farms.

Documenting her and her sanctuary's efforts on Instagram and YouTube helped her develop a social media presence and attracted international media attention, with various foxes featured in her posts also going viral in their own right. According to her husband, she died by suicide after struggling with online harassment. Her death received widespread media coverage and sparked discussion about cyberbullying and mental health.

== Early life ==
Mikayla Anne Raines was born on March 5, 1995, in Burnsville, Minnesota, to Sandi Raines and Don Borchert. She had two sisters and one brother.

== Fox rescuing ==
=== Early interest and efforts in Lakeville, Minnesota ===
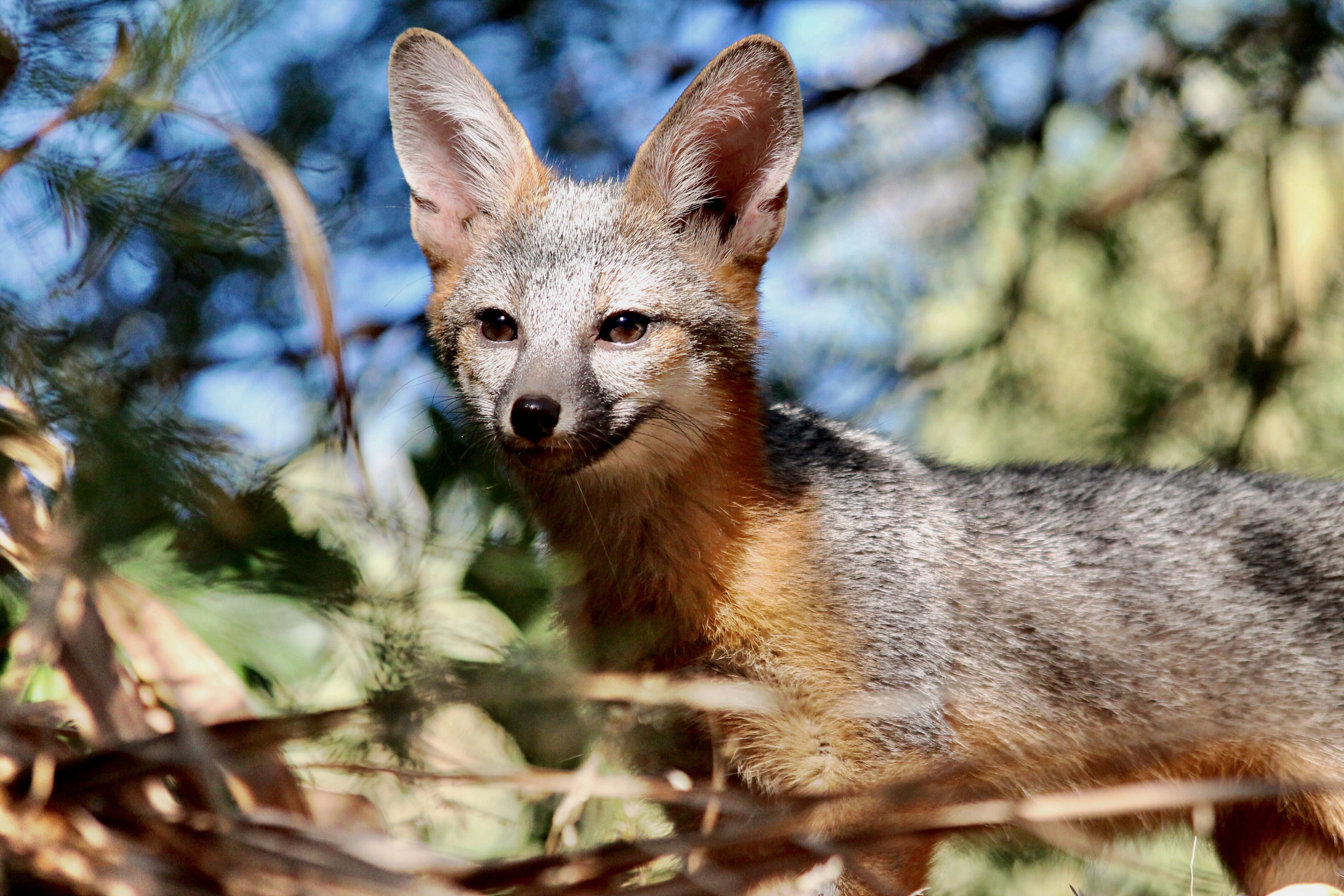
Raines rehabilitated a gray fox (example pictured) when she was fifteen years old.

Raines became interested in rescuing foxes at the age of 15, when she helped one of her friends rehabilitate an orphaned gray fox. At 18, she began taking classes to become licensed as a wildlife rehabilitator, completing the process in 2016. She first took in a fox from a fur farm when she was 19, and by the time she was 21, Raines was USDA-licensed to exhibit and sell foxes. Raines, the Pioneer Press reported, was only comfortable doing the latter to those she vetted; typically, she only sold foxes to fox sanctuaries or those "who have track records owning foxes, preferably with a license similar to hers".

In the spring of 2016, Raines bottle-raised and re-homed ten baby foxes. That April, her local city council in Lakeville, Minnesota voted to allow her to keep foxes on the rural ten-acre property owned by her mother, as long as she also lived there, with the caveat that she did not keep more than three foxes at a time. Raines rehabilitated foxes born in captivity with some defect, which she stated would make them unappealing to fur farms that would ultimately kill them.

The following January, Notchi, one of Raines's pet foxes escaped from an outdoor enclosure. Sighted traveling through southern Minnesota, Raines launched a social media campaign, setting a $1,000 reward for Notchi's return. Notchi was never returned to Raines, though it was reportedly last sighted with another fox, with Raines presuming the two mated.

In May, the city considered revoking her interim-use permit, stating she was keeping more than the allowed three foxes. Raines did not deny this, stating her passion for rehabilitating foxes led to her keeping more than three on the property and starting a rescue under the name "Mikdolittles Fox Rescue". She also was reported to plan to ask the city for an amendment to her permit, stating that the property being "zoned agriculture" should be considered as fur-farm foxes are "considered agricultural animals under state statute". Raines ultimately had her permit revoked.

=== SaveAFox Rescue ===
In 2017, at the age of 22, Raines founded the "SaveAFox Rescue", an officially registered 501(c)(3) charity. At the time of its founding, Raines was studying to be a veterinary technician at Globe University, opting to drop out in order to found SaveAFox. She also served as the organization's executive director. Though Raines's permit in Lakeville was revoked, her followers shortly thereafter donated $60,000 in three months to assist with her cause, helping her open a new operation in Rice County, near Faribault. The fox sanctuary and non-profit organization became the largest fox rescue in the United States by June 2019. Robin Schwartz, who worked as a photographer on a National Geographic profile on Raines, described the SaveAFox rescue in Minnesota as a "fantasy world" and Raines herself as "wood nymph" with a "calm and comfortable" relationship with the sanctuary's animals.

With more people, many from the Southern U.S., wanting to surrender foxes to Raines than she had room for, she sought to expand her efforts. Raines set up a GoFundMe page to raise funds for a second shelter, which ultimately opened in Groveland, Florida in 2020. Through her work rescuing foxes, Raines developed relationships with several fur farmers. One Iowa-based farmer regularly surrendered foxes for over five years to Raines and SaveAFox before retiring around 2023, when he agreed to legally surrender all 500 of his farm's foxes to Raines's rescue, provided the rescue costs could be paid for. The nonprofit launched a fundraiser to raise $700,000 to rescue and relocate the foxes, with 300 of them planned to be housed in a new location in Tennessee and the remaining 200 to be adopted. Raines reportedly spent around US$1 million moving 400 of the foxes from the Iowa farm, with the remaining 100 still in need of care when she died.

While most-associated with foxes, Raines helped rescue other animals, including jackals; her husband stated he had seen her help "birds, reptiles, sheep, [and] squirrels". Though Raines attracted a large following and positive reception for her rescue efforts, she also received some online criticism for her efforts with SaveAFox, with some questioning her ethics in "buying" foxes from fur farms and others accusing her of "hoarding" more foxes than she could care for.

=== Social media presence ===
Raines maintained an Instagram account about the foxes. Around the time she lost her Lakeville permit, the Pioneer Press reported it had earned over 50,000 followers. The account drove sponsorships and donations to her sanctuary's GoFundMe page. Raines also launched a YouTube channel in 2009, which she later used to document the SaveAFox sanctuary. Raines also maintained related accounts on Facebook and TikTok, as well as OnlyFans. The latter account, which she used to help partially fund the rescue, made her a target of online harassment by some users.

Various viral videos, such as one featuring two paired vixens, dubbed "lesbian goth foxes" by viewers based on the foxes' behavior, helped boost her and the sanctuary's social media presence, often garnering the rescue national media attention. Two of Raines's red foxes, Finnegan and Dixie, also achieved online virality in their own right. At the time of her death in June 2025, Raines's accounts on YouTube and Instagram amassed over 2.4 million subscribers and 500,000 followers, respectively.

== Personal life ==
Raines met her husband, Ethan Frankamp, (Note: Some sources name Raines's husband as Ethan Frankamp, while others name him as Ethan Raines.) at SaveAFox Rescue, where he was a volunteer. Frankamp later helped run SaveAFox with Raines. They married at the rescue on December 23, 2020, and together they had one daughter (b. 2021).

== Death ==
Raines died in Faribault, Minnesota, on June 20, 2025, at the age of 30. Frankamp announced Raines's death by suicide in a YouTube video on June 23, 2025, stating that Raines had struggled with depression, autism, and borderline personality disorder (BPD). After an investigation by the Rice County Sheriff's Office, her death was confirmed as a suicide by hanging by the Midwest Medical Examiner's Office.

Frankamp alleged that an online harassment campaign by social media users, others in the wildlife rescue community, and some people whom Raines had known personally had contributed to her death. Reddit users raised discussions regarding the role of "snark subreddits", communities on Reddit dedicated to harassing and spreading rumors about a subject, in Raines's suicide. A snark subreddit about SaveAFox was set to private and appeared to be scrubbed following her death. Users also initiated a petition requesting that Reddit introduce stricter policies around hateful content and shut down snark communities. Her death also sparked general discussions on cyberbullying and its effect on mental health.

A funeral for Raines was held on July 12 at SaveAFox. Other communities also paid tribute to Raines following the news of her death; the video game Overwatch 2 (2023) used the sounds of Raines's foxes in its design for the character Kiriko, and players of the game paid tribute to her.
