= SaveAFox Rescue =

American nonprofit fox rescue

- Nickname: SaveAFox
- Formation: 2017
- Founders: Mikayla Raines
- Type: 501(c)(3) nonprofit organization
- Tax ID no.: 82-3454531
- Legal status: Corporation
- Purpose: Wildlife rehabilitation and fox rescue
- Headquarters: 12245 175th St West; Lakeville, Minnesota 55044, United States
- Region served: Minnesota
- Services: Fox rescue, rehabilitation, and placement
- Fields: Wildlife conservation, animal welfare
- Official language: English
- Director: Ethan Frankamp (Note: Also known as Ethan Raines.)
- Revenue: $1,334,145 (2023)
- Expenses: $949,127 (2023)
- Website: saveafox.org
- Remarks: State and federally licensed wildlife rescue facility

SaveAFox Corporation, publicly known as SaveAFox Rescue, is a 501(c)(3) family owned nonprofit organization based in Lakeville, Minnesota that specializes in rescuing foxes from fur farms, pet surrenders, and illegal ownership. Founded in 2017 by wildlife rehabilitator Mikayla Raines, the organization focuses on rescuing exclusively captive-born, non-releasable wildlife. A second facility was opened in Lake County, Florida in 2022. SaveAFox operates as a United States Department of Agriculture-, Department of Natural Resources-, and Fish and Wildlife Commission-licensed facility.

The organization received a 3-out-of-4 star rating from Charity Navigator and operates under EIN 82-3454531.

== History ==
SaveAFox Corporation was founded in 2017 by Mikayla Raines, who began working with foxes over a decade before starting the organization. Raines was exposed to wildlife rehabilitation by her mother, a licensed rehabilitator. Her transition from wild fox rehabilitation to domestic fox rescue occurred after taking in a tame pet fox, Fiasco, which introduced her to the distinct needs of captive-bred foxes. Raines posted images of Fiasco to Instagram, leading to SaveAFox gaining online fame.

The organization achieved federal 501(c)(3) tax-exempt status and was licensed by multiple regulatory agencies. SaveAFox maintains United States Department of Agriculture, Department of Natural Resources, and Fish and Wildlife Commission licenses, enabling legal operation as a wildlife facility. The rescue has maintained consistent operations since its founding, focusing primarily on foxes and mink from fur farmers and private owners.

In 2022, a second facility was opened in Lake County, Florida after raising funds on GoFundMe. The organization has also appealed for other licensed sanctuaries to help with new arrivals.

Ethan Frankamp, Mikayla's husband, announced on June 23, 2025, that Mikayla had died by suicide on June 20th, due to a combination of mental health issues and online harassment she faced in how SaveAFox was run. He said he would continue to run the organization, saying "I will not let Mikayla's light be extinguished, and I won't let negativity win, and I won't let her mission fall apart." A celebration of life for Raines was held on July 12, 2025 at the facility.

=== Media presence ===
SaveAFox also maintains a social media presence, and Mikayla Raines launched a YouTube channel in 2009 that was later used to document the SaveAFox rescue. The channel has over 2 million YouTube subscribers as of June 2025. Multiple of the channel's videos have gone viral, attracting national media attention to the rescue. and individual foxes of Raines' and the rescue's have garnered popularity in their own right. One such video released during the COVID-19 pandemic, of a male fox named Finnegan that, when petted by Raines, made noises that sounded like laughter, was particularly popular. Another video from the channel, released in December 2021, attracted national media attention to the rescue. Esmae and Mala, a pair of black-and-white bonded foxes from the sanctuary, also went viral in June 2022, as online viewers dubbed the two "lesbian goth foxes".

Audio from foxes at the rescue have been used in the sound design of the video game Overwatch 2 (2023) and the animated film The Wild Robot (2024). After Raines' death, Infuse Studio collaborated with SaveAFox to include some of the foxes at SaveAFox as playable characters in downloadable content in the 2025 video game Spirit of the North 2, with revenue from the content given to SaveAFox to support their fur farm rescues.

== Mission and goals ==
SaveAFox Corporation's stated mission is "to rescue and provide forever homes for captive-born, non-releasable wildlife". The organization specifically targets domestic foxes born in captivity either for the pet trade or fur farming.

The organization focuses on rescuing exclusively captive-born, non-releasable wildlife. This approach attempts to adress the specific needs of captive-bred animals that cannot survive in the wild.

== Programs and activities ==
SaveAFox operates multiple program streams based around direct animal rescue and public education. The organization offers fox sponsorship programs, which allows supporters to financially support specific animals, and maintains an adoption program for qualified applicants.
