= Rainberg =

Mountain in Salzburg, Austria

Coordinates: 47.7947°N 13.0364°E

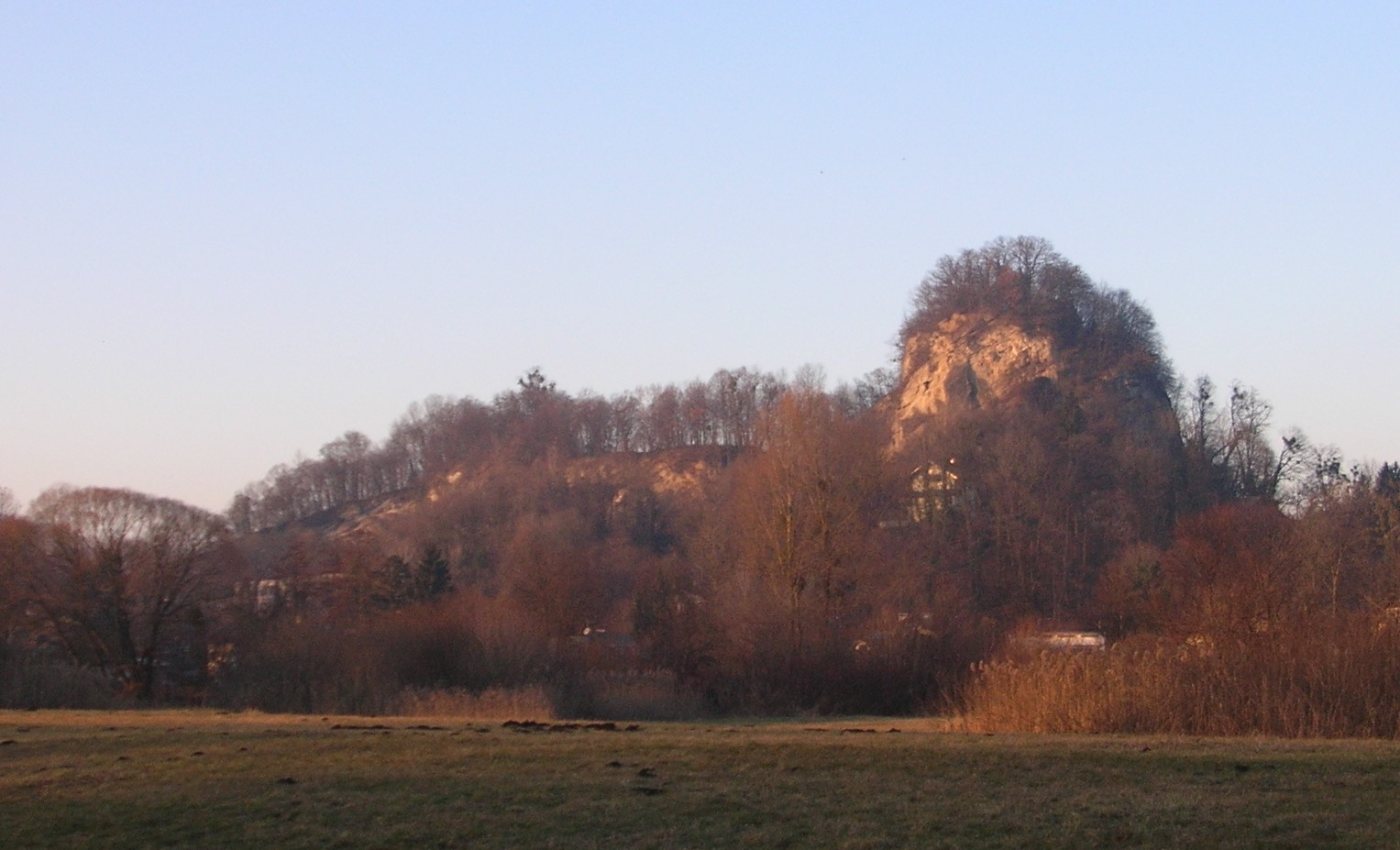
Rainberg.

Rainberg (Austrian German pronunciation: [ˈraɪnbɛrɡ]) is a mountain, in the city of Salzburg, Salzburgerland, Austria.

== Height ==
It is 511 meters high.

== See also ==
- Salzburg
- Salzburgerland
