= Rayna =

Rayna is a feminine given name with multiple origins in diverse cultures. It can also be a middle name.

Rayna (Bulgarian: Райна) is a diminutive of Slavic names such as Radka that contain the element rad-, meaning “happy.” Raya, another name with unrelated origins from multiple cultures, is another Bulgarian variant of the name.

Rayna can also be derived from a name of Germanic origin. Related masculine forms with the same origins are Ragnar, Rainer, Rainier, Rayner, or Reinhard. All mean “strong counsel.”

Also spelled Reina or Reyna, it is also a Yiddish name referring to spiritual or ritual purity.

It may refer to:

== People ==
=== Given name ===
- Rayna Atanasova (born 1944), Bulgarian gymnast
- Rayna Denison, British film and arts scholar
- Rayna Gellert (born 1975), American musician and actress
- Rayna Green (born 1942), American curator and folklorist
- Rayna Grigorova (born 1931), Bulgarian artistic gymnast
- Rayna Kasabova, nurse
- Rayna Katsarova (1901–1984), Bulgarian ethnomusicologist
- Rayna Knyaginya (1856-1917), Bulgarian revolutionary
- Rayna Petkova (1895 – 1957), Bulgarian social worker
- Rayna Prohme (1894 - 1927), American journalist
- Rayna Rapp (born 1946), academic
- Rayna Stewart (born 1973), American professional football player and coach
- Rayna Talinska (born 1888), Bulgarian actress
- Rayna Kirilova Terziyska (born 1981), Bulgarian singer
- Rayna Vallandingham, American martial artist, actress, and social media influencer

=== Middle name ===
- Carolyn Rayna Buckle (born 2000), Singaporean-Australian synchronized swimmer
- Misty Rayna Jenkins, Australian cancer researcher
- Gavilán Rayna Russom, American electronic music producer

== Fictional characters ==
- Rayna, fictional character in the 2015 film, Spy
- Rayna, fictional character in the British thriller television series, Clique
- Rayna Cartflight, one of the main characters in the American animated television series, The Buzz on Maggie
- Rayna Cruz, reoccurring character in season 7 of The Vampire Diaries
- Rayna Jaymes, fictional lead character in the ABC/CMT musical drama series, Nashville
- Rayna Sherazi, reoccurring character from the 2015 Canadian series, Open Heart
