= Reina (given name) =

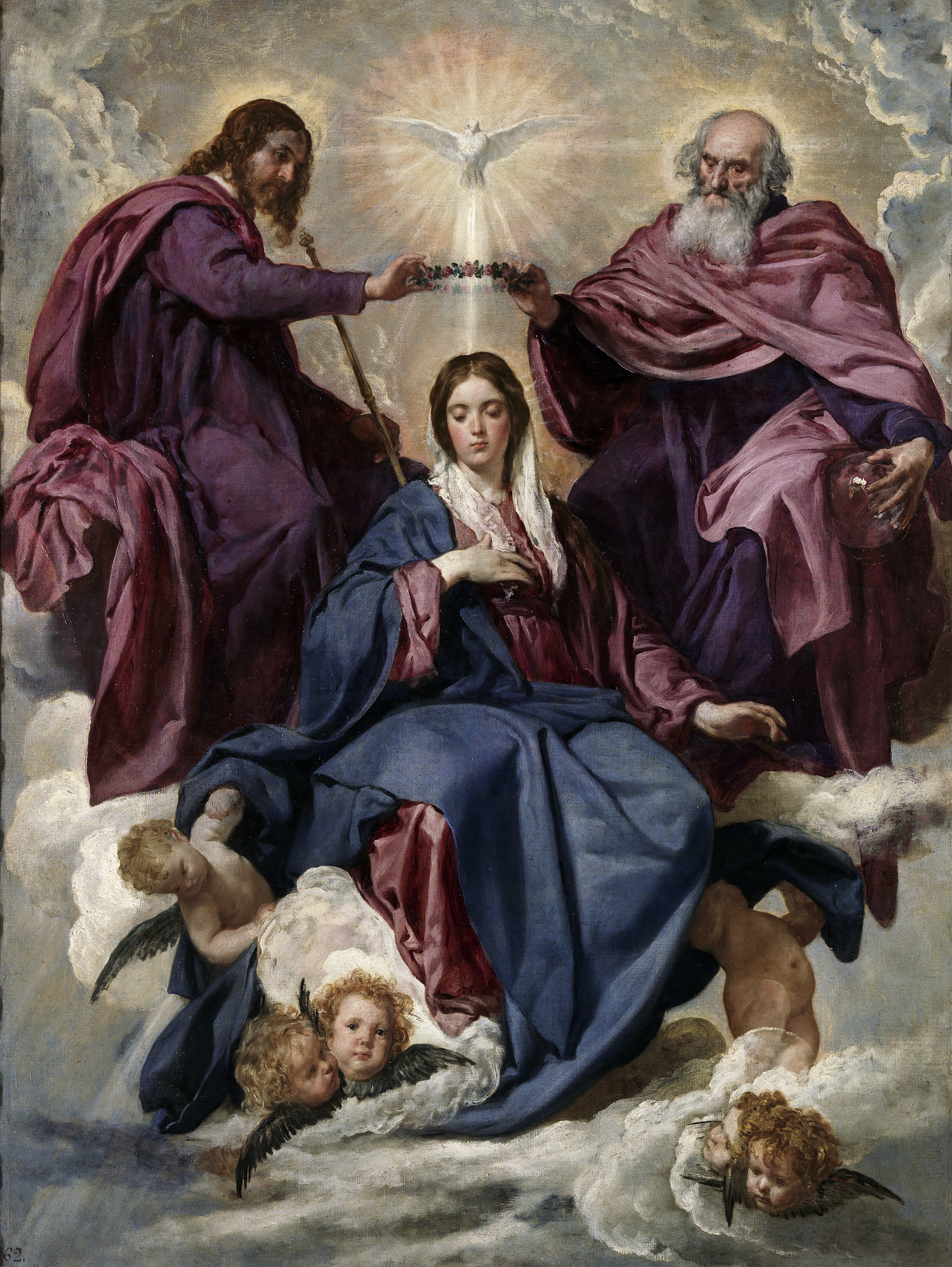
- “Coronation of the Virgin” by Diego Velázquez.
- Gender: Feminine

Origin
- Meaning: “happy” in Bulgarian, English folk etymology of “rain” or “reign” or “rein”, “strong counsel” in Germanic languages, “night” in Hindi, various meanings in Japanese, including “wise”, “queen” in Spanish, “purity” in Yiddish.

Other names
- Related names: Lorraine, Radka, Ragnar, Rain, Raina, Raine, Rainer, Rainier, Rainy, Raya, Rayna, Regan, Regina, Reign, Reine, Reinhard, Reyna, Rhiannon, Ríona, Ryan

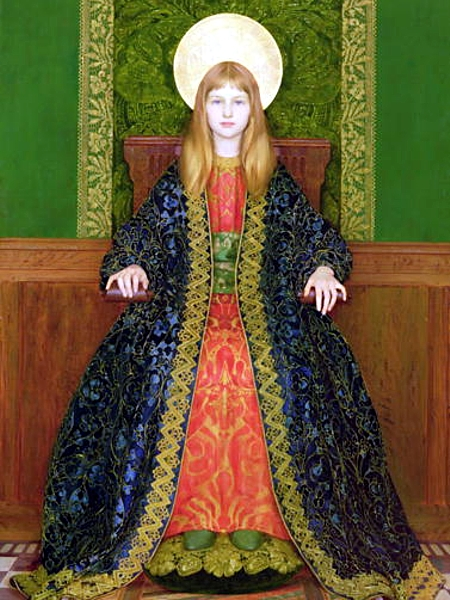
”The Child Enthroned” by Thomas Cooper Gotch, 1894.

Reina, which is also spelled Raina, Rayna, or Reyna in English, is a feminine given name with multiple, unrelated origins from a number of different languages and cultures. All of these unrelated names are pronounced and written similarly in English.

The name means “queen” in Spanish and is related to the Italian name Regina and sometimes used by Catholics in reference to Mary, mother of Jesus, who is called the Queen of Heaven. The French Reine, which also means “queen”, is also a related name.

The Bulgarian name Rayna (Bulgarian: Райна) is a diminutive of Slavic names such as Radka that contain the element rad-, meaning “happy.” Raya, another name with unrelated origins from multiple cultures, is another Bulgarian variant of the name.

Rayna or Raina can also be derived from a name of Germanic origin. Related masculine forms with the same origins are Ragnar, Rainer, Rainier, Rayner, or Reinhard. All mean “strong counsel.”

Reina (Yiddish: רֵיינָא) is also a Yiddish name referring to spiritual or ritual purity, also spelled Rayna or Reyna.

Raina, also spelled Reyna, (Hindi: रैना) is also a Hindi given name and surname meaning “night.”

Reina is also a Japanese name with different meanings depending on the kanji or hiragana symbols that are used to spell it, including (Japanese Kanji: 怜奈) meaning “wise.”

The name also has cognates in the Irish Ríona and Manx Reina, both also meaning "queen".

Some forms of the name are short forms of the name Lorraine and its variants.

Some English versions of the name such as Rainna and Reigna are influenced by its similarity in sound and spelling to the words “rain” and “reign” and “rein”. Rain, Raine, Rainy, Reign, and Rein, which might also be derived from other sources such as a short form of Germanic names such as Reinhard, and spelling variants are also in use as names for both sexes.

== Popularity ==
Reina was among the top 10 most popular names for newborn girls in Albania in recent years. Reina has been in occasional use in other countries, including the United States, where it has ranked among the top 1,000 names in use for newborn girls since 2000. In 2020, the year it was most popular there, it was used for 488 American girls, or 0.028 percent, of females born that year and was ranked as the 591st most popular name. It was the 622nd most-used name for American girls in 2022. Other spellings of the name are also well used in the United States. Reyna was the 594th most used name for American newborn girls in 2020, with 486 uses, or 0.03 percent, for baby girls and ranked 579th in 2021, with 520 uses. That spelling of the name ranked 578th on the popularity chart in 2022, with 514 uses. Rayna also has ranked among the top 1,000 names for American girls in recent years. In 2020, 396 American girls, or 0.02 percent of females born that year, received the name, which was the 702nd most used name for newborn girls in the United States. In 2021, the name Rayna was given to 390 girls and the name was ranked in 727th place. In 2022, it ranked in 763rd place, with 373 girls given the name. Raina also has recently ranked among the top 1,000 names for American girls and ranked 809th in 2020, with 332, or 0.02 percent, of girls born that year given the name. Some 304 girls were called Raina in the United States in 2021, the year it ranked in 887th place on the popularity chart. It ranked 926th in 2022, with 290 girls given the name. Other spellings in occasional use in the United States include Rainah, Rainna, Raynah, Reigna, and Reynah.

== Notable people ==
- Reyna I. Aburto (born 1963), Nicaraguan-born American religious leader, language translation specialist, and public speaker.
- Reina Asami, (浅見 れいな, born 1983), Japanese actress and model
- Reina del Cid (born 1988), American singer-songwriter
- Reina Fujie (藤江 れいな; born 1994), Japanese actress
- Reyna Gallegos, Mexican retired female professional wrestler
- Rayna Gellert (born 1975), American musician
- Reyna Grande (born 1975), Mexican author
- Rayna Grigorova (Райна Иванова Григорова, born 1931), Bulgarian retired gymnast
- Reyna Hamui (born 1993), Mexican figure skater
- Reina Hardesty, American actress
- Reina James (born 1947), British author
- Rayna Kasabova (Райна Касабова (1897–1969), Bulgarian nurse and first woman to fly on a combat mission
- Rayna Knyaginya (Rayna Popgeorgieva Futekova (Райна Попгеоргиева Футекова (1856–1917), Bulgarian revolutionary
- Reina Kondō (近藤 玲奈, born 1999), Japanese voice actress and singer
- Reina Kubo (久保 玲奈; born 1999), Japanese singer
- Reina Kurosaki (黒崎 レイナ, born 1998), Japanese actress, tarento, and fashion model
- Reina Lewis (born 1963), British art historian and author
- Reyna Marroquín (1941–1969, Salvadoran woman murdered in the United States)
- Reina Maruyama, Japanese–American experimental particle/atomic/nuclear physicist
- Reina Miura (三浦 伶奈, born 1996), Japanese professional mixed martial arts artist
- Reina Miyauchi (宮内玲奈, born 1978), Japanese singer
- Reina Nagata (永田 怜奈, born 1992), Japanese beauty pageant titleholder
- Reyna Pacheco (born 1994), Mexican-American professional squash player
- Rayna Petkova (Райна Петкова, 1895 – 1957), Bulgarian social worker
- Reina Prinsen Geerligs (1922–1943), member of Dutch Resistance executed during World War II
- Rayna Rapp (born 1946), American academic
- Reina Reech (born 1958), Austrian-Argentine actress and dancer
- Reyna Reyes (born 2001), Mexican-American footballer
- Reyna Roberts (born 1997), American country music singer-songwriter
- Reina Roffé (born 1951), Argentine writer
- Reyna Rueda, Nicaraguan politician
- Reina Shirowa (城和 怜奈; born 2002), Japanese professional footballer
- Reina Sumi, (鷲見 玲奈, born 1999) Japanese freelance announcer and tarento
- Reina Tanaka (田中 れいな, born 1989), Japanese singer
- Rayna Kirilova Terziyska (Райна Кирилова Терзийска, Bulgarian singer
- Reina Triendl (トリンドル 玲奈, born 1992), Japanese fashion model
- Reina Umehara (梅原 玲奈; born 1983), Japanese freestyle skier
- Reina Ueda (上田 麗奈, born 1994), Japanese voice actress
- Reina Valdez, American silent film actress
- Reina Washio (鷲尾伶菜, born 1994), Japanese singer, performer and model

== Fictional characters ==
- Reina, a fictional character in the Tekken video game series
- Reina, a fictional character in the Korean MMORPG MapleStory serving as the main antagonist of Arteria storyline
- Reina, a fictional character in the game Fields of Mistria
- Reina Aharen, a fictional character in the Aharen-san wa Hakarenai series
- Reina Amamiya, a fictional character in the anime Star Twinkle PreCure
- Reina Kousaka, a fictional character in the Hibike! Euphonium series
- Reyna Ramirez Arellano, a fictional character in the Rick Riordan book series universe
- Reina Roja, a fictional character in the Android: Netrunner universe
- Reina Soho, a fictional character in the Witchblade anime
- Reina Yagami, a fictional character in the Inazuma Eleven series

== See also ==
- Reina (surname)
- Reina (disambiguation)
