= Ragnar =

Male given name

Ragnar (Old Norse: Ragnarr [ˈrɑɣnˌɑrː]) is a masculine Germanic given name, composed of the Old Norse elements ragin- "counsel" and hari- "army".

== Origin and variations ==
The Proto-Germanic forms of the compounds are "ragina" (counsel) and "harjaz" or "hariz" (army). The Old High German form is Raginheri, Reginheri, which gave rise to the modern German form Rainer, the French variant Rainier, the Italian variant Ranieri and the Latvian variant Renārs. The Old English form is "Rægenhere" (attested for example in the name of the son of king Rædwald of East-Anglia). The name also existed among the Franks as "Ragnahar" (recorded as Ragnachar in the book "History of the Franks" by Gregory of Tours).

== History of usage ==
The name is on record since the 9th century, both in Scandinavia and in the Frankish empire; the form Raginari is recorded in a Vandalic (5th or 6th century) graffito in Carthage.

The name was variously Latinized as Raganarius, Reginarius, Ragenarius, Raginerus, Ragnerus, Reginherus. The Scandinavian patronymic form is Ragnarsson.

In the modern period, the name was rarely given before the 1880s. It enjoyed a revival in the late 19th and early 20th century, in connection with national romanticism in Scandinavia. The name is now current as Ragnar in Iceland, Norway, Sweden and The Faroe Islands and as Ragner in Denmark. A hypocoristic form used in Sweden is Ragge. The name's popularity in Norway peaked during the 1920s and 1930s, during which time it was given to more than 0.7% of newly born boys, but it has declined ever since the late 1930s, falling below the fraction of 0.1% of given names in the 1970s. The Norwegian statistics office reports 4,652 Norwegian men with the given name in 2015.

In Iceland, the name remains popular, recorded at rank 21 (given to 0.76% of newly born boys) as of 2014. The Icelandic statistics office recorded 1,286 Icelandic men (0.2%) with the given name as of November 2005.

== Given name ==
=== Medieval ===
- Ragnar Lodbrok, 9th century Viking

=== Modern ===
- Ragnar Berge (1925–1995), Norwegian footballer
- Ragnar Colvin (1882–1954), British Royal Navy admiral
- Ragnar Edenman (1914–1998), Swedish politician
- Ragnar Ekberg (1886–1966), Swedish athlete
- Ragnar Fjørtoft (1913–1998), Norwegian meteorologist
- Ragnar Fogelmark (1888–1914), Swedish wrestler
- Ragnar Frisch (1895–1973), Norwegian economist
- Ragnar Granit (1900–1991), Finnish-Swedish Nobel laureate
- Ragnar Gripe (1883–1942), Swedish sailor
- Ragnar Gyllenswärd (1891–1967), Swedish jurist
- Ragnar Hult (1857–1899), Finnish botanist and plant geographer
- Ragnar Josephson (1891–1966), Swedish art historian and writer
- Ragnar Kvam (1917–2006), Norwegian writer and translator
- Ragnar Skanåker (born 1934), Swedish pistol shooter, 7 time Olympian
- Ragnar Kjartansson (performance artist) (born 1976), Icelandic performance artist
- Ragnar Klavan (born 1985), Estonian footballer
- Ragnar Oratmangoen, (born 1998), Dutch-born Indonesian footballer
- Ragnar Olson (1880–1955), Swedish horse rider
- Ragnar Östberg (1866–1945), Swedish architect
- Ragnar Rump (born 1991), Estonian football and futsal player
- Ragnar Sigurðsson (born 1986), Icelandic professional footballer
- Ragnar Sigvald Skancke (1890–1948), Norwegian politician
- Ragnar Søegaard, Norwegian businessman
- Ragnar Sohlman (1870–1948), Swedish chemical engineer and creator of the Nobel Foundation

== Surname ==
- Sven Erik Ragnar, Swedish bank executive and scout leader
- Per Ragnar, Swedish actor, director and author

== Pseudonym ==
- Ragnar Redbeard, the pseudonymous author of Might Is Right (1890)

== Fictional characters ==
- Ragnar Lothbrok, main character in the television series Vikings, portrayed by Travis Fimmel and based on Ragnar Lodbrok
- Ragnar Danneskjöld, in Ayn Rand's novel Atlas Shrugged (1957)
- Ragnar McRyan, in the role-playing game Dragon Quest IV: Chapters of the Chosen (1990)
- Ragnar Sturlusson, in the film The Golden Compass (1995)
- Ragnar Blackmane, "Thunderfist", in the Space Wolf series by William King
- Ragnar, the main character in the video game Rune (2000)
- Ragnar Ravnson and his son, Ragnar Ragnarson, in The Saxon Stories historical novel series by Bernard Cornwell
- Ragnar Volarus, in the Red Rising trilogy (2015)
- Ragnar Ragnarsson, in the television series The last kingdom

== See also ==
- Ragnaris, a 6th-century Hunnic-Germanic warlord
- Ragenar, 9th-century Frankish bishop
- Rainer (given name)
- Rainer (surname)
- Reginar
- Reina (given name)
- Ragnar (disambiguation)
- Regnier (disambiguation)
- Reynier (disambiguation)
- Reinier
- Rainier (disambiguation)
- Ranieri
- Renārs
- Ragnar Relay Series, series of distance relay races
- Ragnar, the former mascot of the Minnesota Vikings American football team
