= De Ranieri =

De Ranieri is a surname. Notable people with the surname include:

- Aristide de Ranieri, (1865–1954), Italian sculptor
- Sem De Ranieri (1888–1979), Italian sports shooter

== See also ==
- Ranieri (surname)
