= Hoby Darling =

American business executive

- Born: Seth Darling; Cashmere, Washington, U.S.
- Education: Western Washington University (BA); Northwestern University (JD); University of California, Berkeley (MBA); Columbia University (MBA)
- Occupation: Business executive
- Employers: Previously: Latham & Watkins; Volcom; Nike; Skullcandy; Logitech
- Title: President of Riot Games
- Term: 2025–present
- Board member of: Skullcandy; Ragnar Relay

Seth "Hoby" Darling is an American business executive and former lawyer currently serving as the president of video game developer Riot Games. He has served in corporate roles within apparel, sports, and technology companies.

== Early life and education ==
Darling was raised in Cashmere, Washington, and attended Cashmere High School. Growing up, he aspired to be a high school teacher and football coach. He attended Western Washington University in Bellingham, Washington, graduating in 1997 with a BA degree in history. He then attended law school at the Pritzker School of Law at Northwestern University, graduating with a JD. Darling also graduated from the Berkeley–Columbia Executive MBA program in 2008, resulting in an MBA degree from both the Haas School of Business and Columbia Business School. He has returned to the Western Washington University campus to speak with students about his career.

== Career ==
As a lawyer, Darling worked for the Latham & Watkins law firm from their office in Orange County, California. He took over their account with apparel brand Volcom in 2004, and advised the company during its initial public offering process. Darling was offered a job by Volcom's chairman in 2005, becoming their general counsel and vice president of strategic development. He worked at Volcom until 2011, when he joined Nike. At Nike, he served as general manager for Nike+ Digital Sport—the digital innovation division of Nike that released Nike+ Kinect Training—and on the leadership team for Nike Affiliates, a group including Converse and Hurley.

In 2013, he was named the chief executive officer of Skullcandy, a headphones company. At Skullcandy, he implemented the three-word mantra "people, culture, and values" as the company foundation, and implemented exercise into the company culture through employee participation in events like Spartan Race and Tough Mudder. He embraced the company's position as an underdog relative to Beats by Dre, Sony, and Bose, and took on athletes as brand ambassadors.

Darling began working for Logitech in 2017, where he served as an executive in the esports division. As of 2020, he was serving on the boards of directors for Skullcandy and Ragnar Relays. In 2023, he was appointed to the board of mattress brand Purple Innovation, Inc. In 2025, it was announced that Darling would be moving on from Logitech to serve as the president of Riot Games, the Tencent-owned developer of Valorant and League of Legends.

== Personal life ==
In his personal life, Darling is also a CrossFit instructor and competes in CrossFit competitions. While working for Skullcandy in Park City, Utah, he attended CrossFit sessions four days a week. He also consumes a flexible paleo diet. In 2025, he and his wife had daughters aged fifteen and eighteen.
