= Reyna (given name) =

Reyna is a feminine given name with multiple origins in diverse cultures.

It is a spelling variant of Reina. The name means “queen” in Spanish and Filipino and is related to the Italian name Regina and sometimes used by Catholics in reference to Mary, mother of Jesus,

Also spelled Rayna or Reina, it is also a Yiddish name referring to spiritual or ritual purity.

It may refer to:

- Reyna I. Aburto (born 1963), Nicaraguan-born American religious leader, language translation specialist, and public speaker
- Reyna Gallegos, Mexican retired female professional wrestler
- Reyna Grande (born 1975), Mexican author
- Reyna Hamui (born 1993), Mexican figure skater
- Reyna Marroquín (1941-1969, Salvadoran woman murdered in the United States)
- Reyna Pacheco (born 1994), Mexican-American professional squash player
- Reyna Reyes (born 2001), Mexican-American footballer
- Reyna Roberts (born 1997), American country music singer-songwriter
- Reyna Rueda, Nicaraguan politician
