= Ragnarsson =

Patronymic

Ragnarsson is the patronymic of the Scandinavian given name Ragnar. It remains in use as a true patronymic in Iceland, and as a surname in Sweden.

== Patronymic ==
- Arnþór Ragnarsson (born 1968), Icelandic swimmer
- Baldur Ragnarsson (1930–2018), Icelandic poet
- Baldur Þór Ragnarsson (born 1990), Icelandic basketball coach
- Friðrik Ragnarsson (born 1970), Icelandic basketball player
- Halfdan Ragnarsson (died 877), Viking leader of the Great Heathen Army
- Hjálmar H. Ragnarsson (1952–2026), Icelandic composer
- Jón Erling Ragnarsson (born 1964), Icelandic footballer
- Jörundur Ragnarsson (born 1979), Icelandic actor
- Ubbe Ragnarsson (died 878), Norse leader during the Viking Age

== Surname ==
- Cecilia Ragnarsson (born 1986), Swedish model
- Huggy Ragnarsson, Icelandic-born American photographer
- Jakob Ragnarsson (born 1999), American-born Swedish ice hockey player
- Jörgen Ragnarsson (born 1954), Swedish sailor
- Julia Ragnarsson (born 1992), Swedish actress
- Kristjan T. Ragnarsson (born 1943), Icelandic physiatrist
- Marcus Ragnarsson (born 1971), Swedish ice hockey player
- Ómar Ragnarsson (born 1940), Icelandic journalist
- Thomas Ragnarsson (born 1970), Swedish politician
