= Gustav Lindström =

Swedish ice hockey player (born 1998)

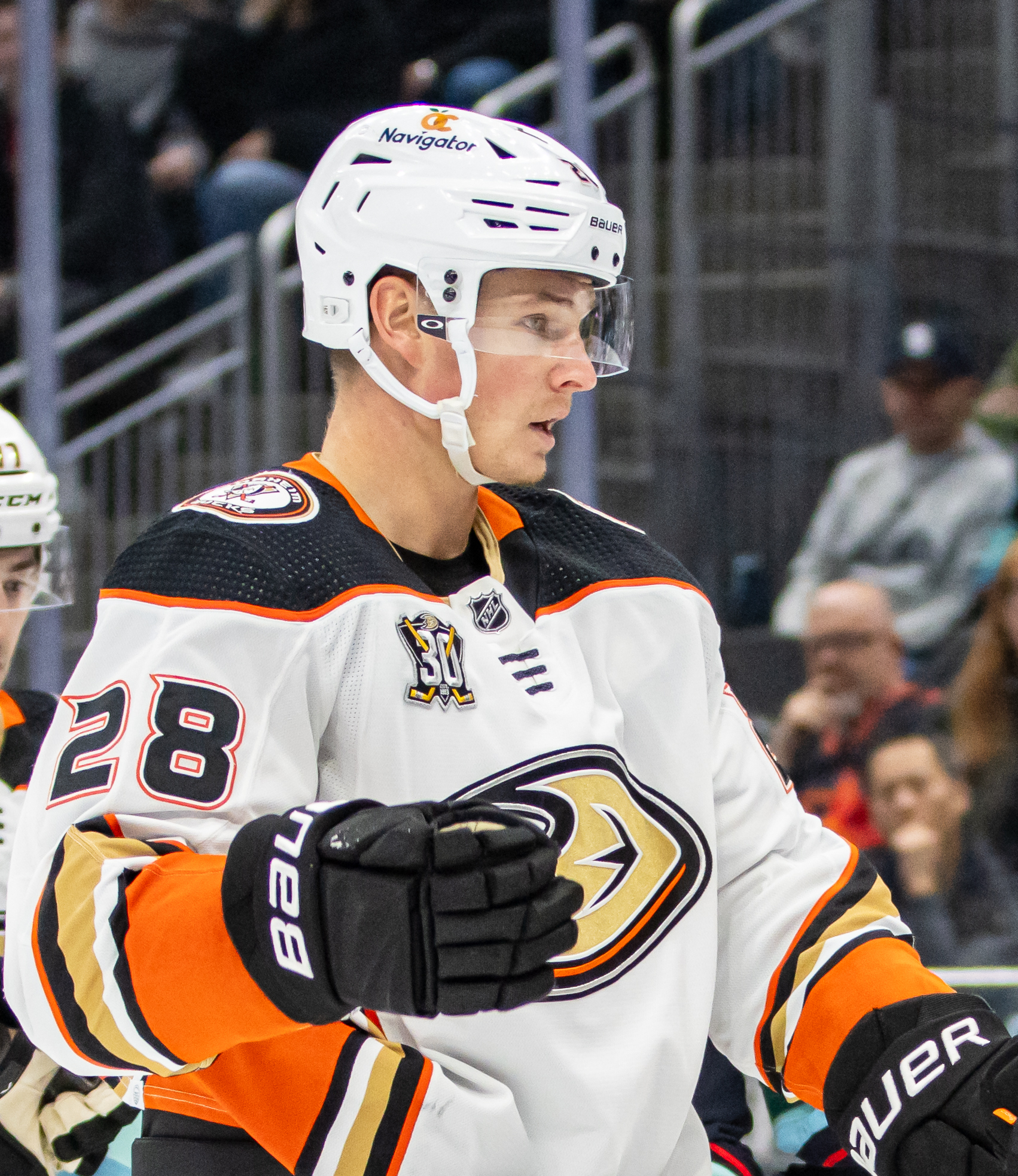
- Lindström with the Anaheim Ducks in 2024
- Born: 20 October 1998 (age 28) Östervåla, Sweden
- Height: 6 ft 2 in (188 cm)
- Weight: 187 lb (85 kg; 13 st 5 lb)
- Position: Defence
- Shoots: Right
- SHL team Former teams: Djurgårdens IF; Frölunda HC; Detroit Red Wings; Montreal Canadiens; Anaheim Ducks
- NHL draft: 38th overall, 2017; Detroit Red Wings
- Playing career: 2016–present

Gustav Lindström (born 20 October 1998) is a Swedish professional ice hockey player who is a defenceman for Djurgårdens IF of the Swedish Hockey League (SHL). He was selected in the second round, 38th overall, by the Detroit Red Wings in the 2017 NHL entry draft. Lindström has also previously played for the Anaheim Ducks and Montreal Canadiens.

== Playing career ==
=== Sweden ===
Lindström played junior hockey with Almtuna IS of the HockeyAllsvenskan, scoring six goals and 14 points in 39 games over the course of his final campaign with the team. He then joined Frölunda HC of the top-tier Swedish Hockey League (SHL) for the 2018–19 season, replacing a departing Rasmus Dahlin. Collectively, he registered three goals and six points in 40 games en route to his team capturing Le Mat Trophy as SHL champions. The team would also win a Champions Hockey League title that same year.

=== Detroit Red Wings ===
Selected by the Detroit Red Wings of the National Hockey League (NHL) with the 38th overall pick in the 2017 NHL entry draft, Lindström was signed to a three-year entry-level contract with the team in May 2018. On 5 February 2020, he was recalled by the Red Wings after an injury to Mike Green. Prior to being recalled, he posted five assists in 45 games with Detroit's American Hockey League (AHL) affiliate, the Grand Rapids Griffins. He made his NHL debut the next day in a game against the Buffalo Sabres. On 17 August 2020, Lindström agreed to return on loan to his former Swedish club, Almtuna IS of the Allsvenskan, until the commencement of the pandemic-delayed NHL season.

On 26 July 2021, Lindström agreed to a two-year, $1.7 million contract extension with the Red Wings. On 15 February 2022, he scored his first career NHL goal against Kaapo Kähkönen in a 7–4 loss to the Minnesota Wild. During the 2022–23 season, he recorded one goal and seven assists in 36 games for the Red Wings and again signed a one-year contract extension with the team in July 2023.

=== Montreal Canadiens ===
On 15 August 2023, Lindström was traded by the Red Wings, along with a conditional 2025 fourth-round pick, to the Montreal Canadiens in exchange for defenceman Jeff Petry. After beginning the 2023–24 season with the Laval Rocket, Montreal's AHL affiliate, Lindström was recalled by the Canadiens on 24 October 2023 after David Savard suffered an injury. He made his Canadiens debut that night against the New Jersey Devils before being reassigned to Laval once again on 4 November 2023. After being recalled to the Canadiens while Joel Armia was away on a conditioning stint, Lindström scored his first goal with the Canadiens on 14 November 2023 against Jacob Markström of the Calgary Flames. He played in 14 games for the Canadiens, scoring three goals and four points before being placed on waivers on 9 January 2024 with the intent on sending him back to Laval.

=== Anaheim Ducks ===
On 10 January 2024, Lindström was claimed on waivers by the Anaheim Ducks. He made his debut with the Ducks on 15 January versus the Florida Panthers. After posting six points (all assists) in 32 games with the Ducks, he was ultimately not extended a qualifying offer at season's end, therefore rendering him an unrestricted free agent.

After going unsigned prior to the 2024–25 NHL season, Lindström accepted an invitation to return to the Ducks organization and attend training camp on a professional tryout (PTO) basis in September 2024. However, he failed to make the team and was subsequently released from his PTO on 4 October.

=== Return to Montreal and Sweden ===
On 9 October 2024, Lindström agreed to a one year, two-way deal to return to the Canadiens organization. After clearing waivers, he was assigned to Laval for the 2024–25 AHL season. In June 2025, he was signed to a five-year contract by Djurgårdens IF of the SHL.

== International play ==
Medal record

Representing Sweden

Men's ice hockey

World Junior Championships
Silver medal – second place	2018 United States	

Lindström played for Sweden at the 2018 World Junior Championship earning a silver medal following defeat by Canada in the final game of the tournament.

== Personal life ==
Lindström's uncle is Marcus Ragnarsson, a defenceman who played nine seasons in the NHL for the San Jose Sharks and the Philadelphia Flyers. His cousin, Jakob Ragnarsson, also plays hockey and was selected by the New York Rangers (70th overall) in the 2018 NHL entry draft.

In May 2025, Lindström and his partner, Agnes Aronsson, announced that they were expecting their first child.

== Career statistics ==
=== Regular season and playoffs ===
			Regular season					Playoffs
Season	Team	League	GP	G	A	Pts	PIM	GP	G	A	Pts	PIM
2014–15	Almtuna IS	J20.2	—	—	—	—	—	4	1	1	2	6
2015–16	Almtuna IS	J20.2	3	0	4	4	2	1	0	0	0	0
2016–17	Almtuna IS	J20.2	6	6	4	10	10	—	—	—	—	—
2016–17	Almtuna IS	Allsv	48	2	7	9	26	—	—	—	—	—
2017–18	Almtuna IS	Allsv	39	6	8	14	34	—	—	—	—	—
2018–19	Frölunda HC	SHL	40	3	3	6	50	6	0	0	0	0
2019–20	Grand Rapids Griffins	AHL	45	0	5	5	26	—	—	—	—	—
2019–20	Detroit Red Wings	NHL	16	0	1	1	14	—	—	—	—	—
2020–21	Almtuna IS	Allsv	20	0	11	11	20	—	—	—	—	—
2020–21	Grand Rapids Griffins	AHL	13	0	3	3	8	—	—	—	—	—
2020–21	Detroit Red Wings	NHL	13	0	3	3	0	—	—	—	—	—
2021–22	Detroit Red Wings	NHL	63	1	12	13	22	—	—	—	—	—
2022–23	Detroit Red Wings	NHL	36	1	7	8	20	—	—	—	—	—
2023–24	Laval Rocket	AHL	4	0	0	0	2	—	—	—	—	—
2023–24	Montreal Canadiens	NHL	14	3	1	4	6	—	—	—	—	—
2023–24	Anaheim Ducks	NHL	32	0	6	6	18	—	—	—	—	—
2024–25	Laval Rocket	AHL	42	4	7	11	28	13	1	1	2	2
SHL totals			40	3	3	6	50	6	0	0	0	0
NHL totals			174	5	30	35	80	—	—	—	—	—

=== International ===
Year	Team	Event	Result	GP	G	A	Pts	PIM
2018	Sweden	WJC	2nd place, silver medalist(s)	7	0	1	1	8
Junior totals				7	0	1	1	8

== Awards and honours ==
Award	Year	Ref
CHL
Champions (Frölunda HC)	2019	
SHL
Le Mat Trophy (Frölunda HC)	2019	
