= Regiane =

Regiane is a feminine Brazilian given name. Notable people with the name include:

- Regiane Alves (born 1978), Brazilian actress and model
- Regiane Bidias (born 1986), Brazilian volleyball player

== See also ==
- Regine
