= Liberty Orchards =

Packaged food products company

- Company type: Private
- Industry: Wholesale – Packaged Food Manufacture
- Founded: Cashmere, Washington (1918)
- Headquarters: Cashmere, Washington, United States
- Products: Candy, Confections, Fruit products
- Revenue: $8,100,000
- Number of employees: 80
- Website: www.libertyorchards.com

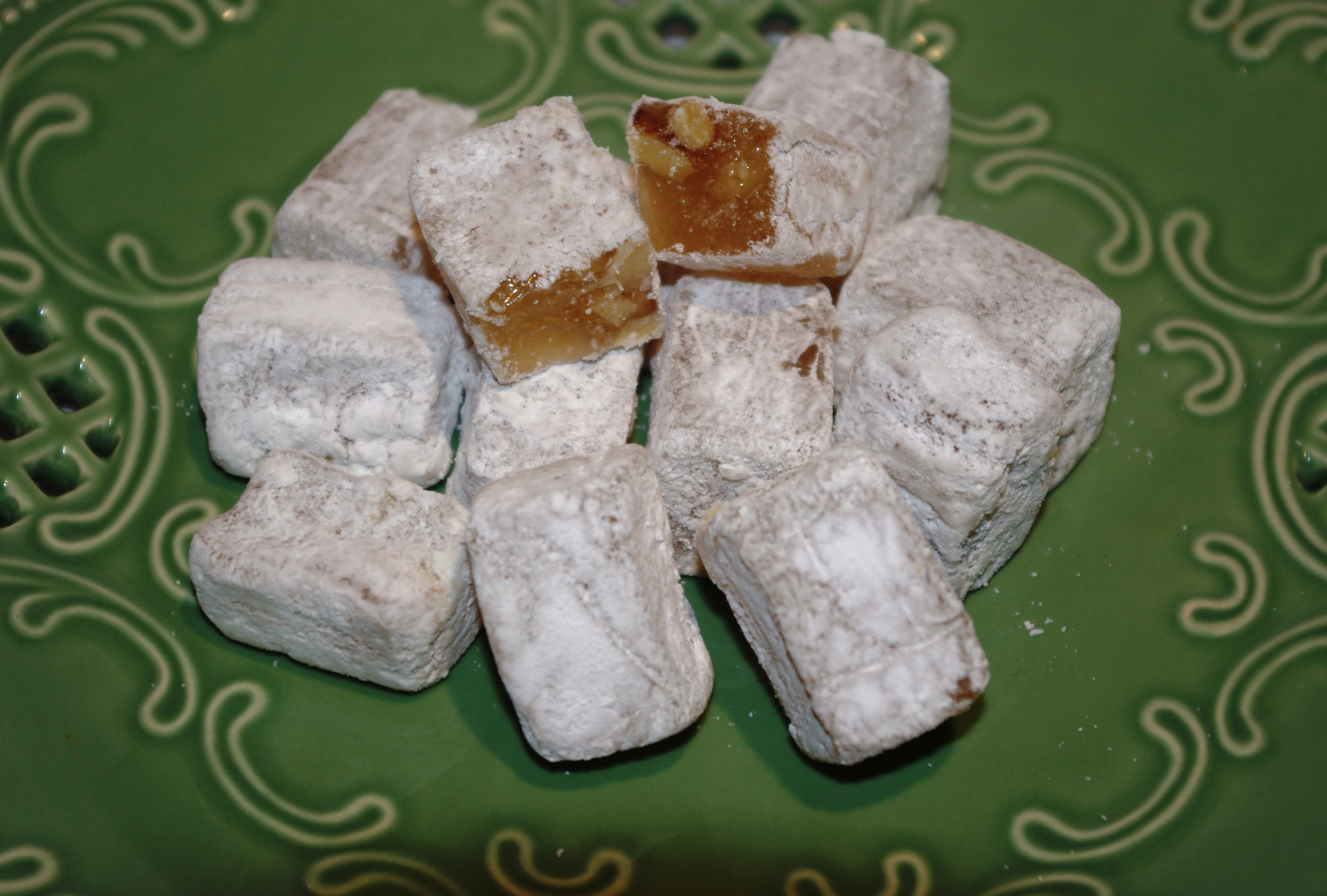
Aplets & Cotlets

Liberty Orchards is a packaged food products company located in Cashmere, Washington. Founded as an apple farm in 1918 by Armenian business partners Armen Tertsagian and Mark Balaban, the company moved into canning and then confectionery during the 1930s and 1940s.

On March 16, 2021, Liberty Orchards president Greg Taylor announced that the company would close permanently on June 1, 2021.The company was luckily purchased before the close date and are still open to this day. The company was sold to KDV Group, a Russian food conglomerate, in late May.

== Product line ==
Aplets & Cotlets are Liberty Orchards' oldest and best known products. These two types of confection are mainly sold together in a single box; they are produced from a recipe for locoum using local apples and apricots.

Other flavors produced by the company include pineapple with macadamia nuts, strawberry with walnuts, orange with walnuts, peach with pecans, blueberry with pecans, and raspberry with pecans. They also produce sugar-free, nut-free and chocolate-covered varieties, as well as a number of traditional filled chocolates (truffle, caramel, and mint, for example). In 2009, the company has introduced a cherry-pecan locoum, as well as four varieties (mango, strawberry, watermelon and papaya) dusted with a sweet-sour-spicy coating.

Although many of these confections are marketed under American-style brand-names, they are referred to on product packaging as "Rahat Locoum." Since 2012, the company has also marketed a line of confections with special packaging under the name "Turkish Delights," which includes traditional Middle Eastern flavors such as rose-pistachio, orange-blossom-walnut, mint, and rose-lemon.

== Local community interaction ==
Liberty Orchard products are widely distributed via national chain stores and on the internet.

In September 1997 Liberty Orchards was criticized for threatening to move production out of Cashmere unless the town met certain demands that the company hoped would increase their brand profile. These were reported by The New York Times at the time:

"They want all road signs and official correspondence by the city to say 'Cashmere, Home of Aplets and Cotlets'. They have asked that one of the two main streets in town be changed to Cotlets Avenue, and the other one be renamed Aplets Avenue. The candy maker also wants the Mayor and Council to sell City Hall to them, build new parking lots and possibly go to the bond market to start a tourism campaign on behalf of the worldwide headquarters of a company that says its story is 'America in a nutshell'."
