= Alice Salomon University of Applied Sciences Berlin =

Coordinates: 52.537°N 13.605°E

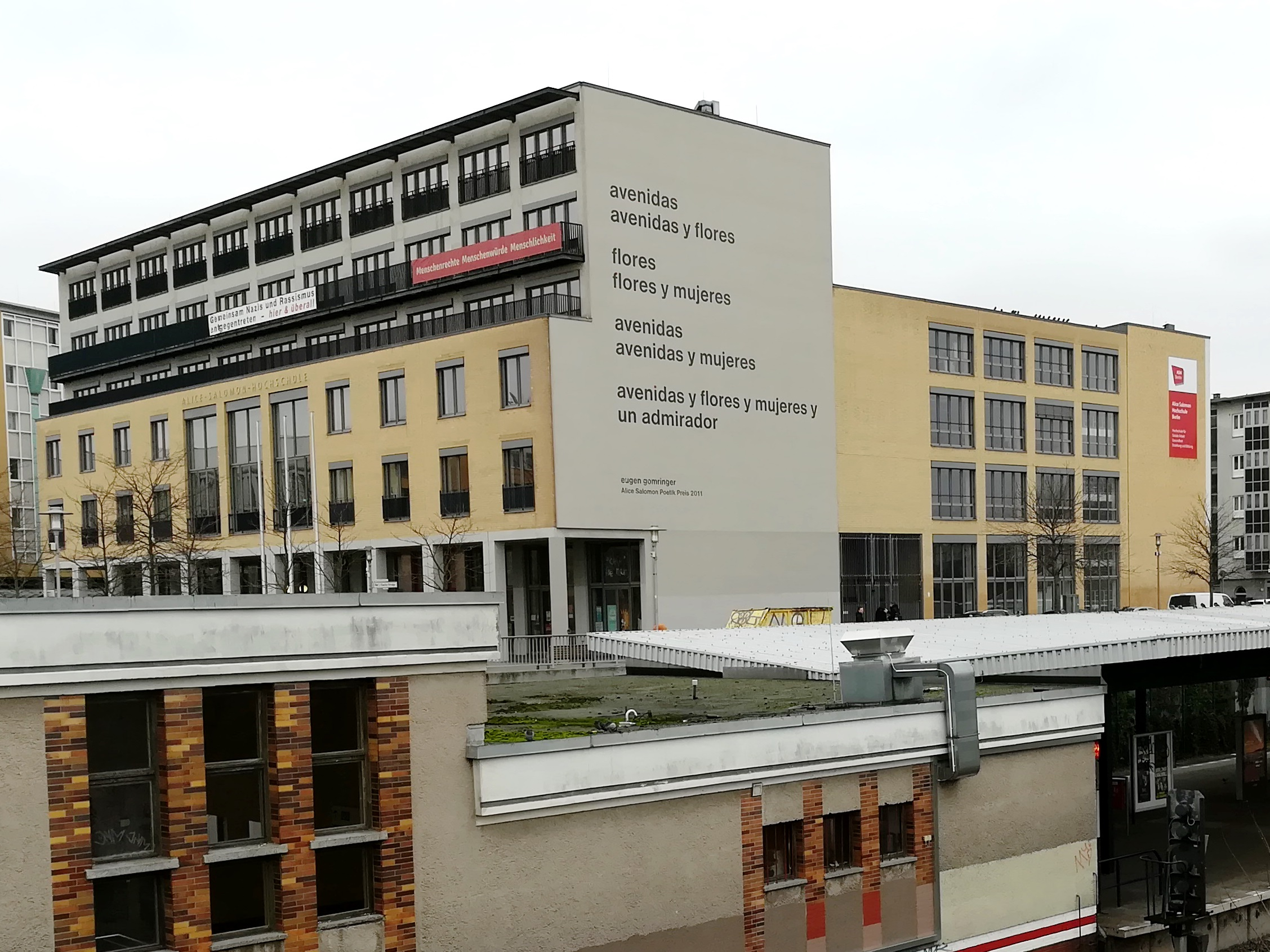
University with Eugen Gomringer's poem until 2018

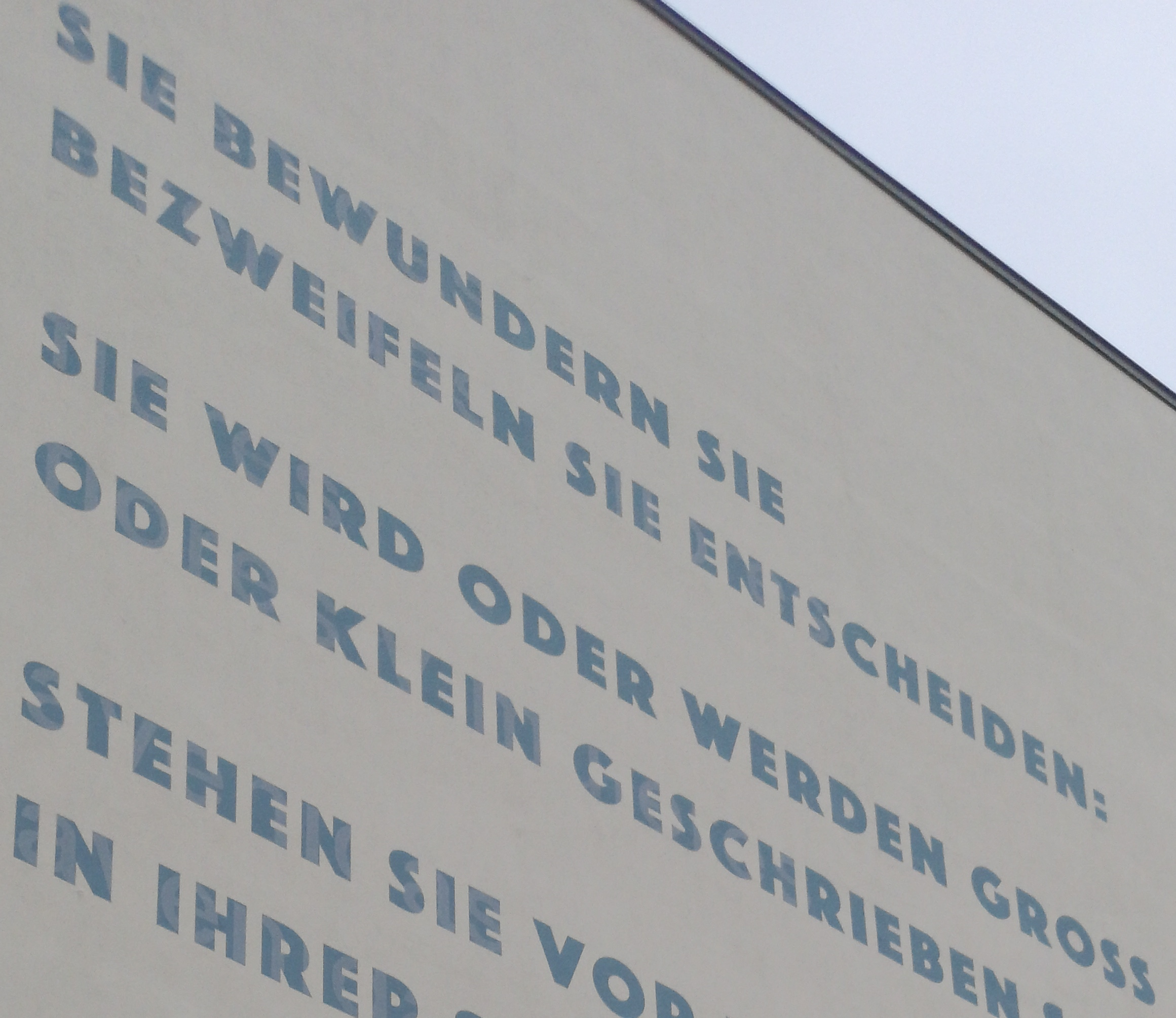
Barbara Köhler's poem since 2018

The Alice Salomon University of Applied Sciences Berlin (German: Alice-Salomon-Hochschule Berlin, or ASH) is a vocational university for social work, public health and early childhood education in Berlin, Germany. Located in the district of Berlin-Hellersdorf, ASH is a state-run institution that focuses on applied sciences with a strong emphasis on social responsibility, equality, and interdisciplinary collaboration.

== History ==
Its origins date back to 1893 when social reformers and feminists in Berlin established the Girls and Women's Groups for Social Aide Work, initiating systematic training for social work through one-year courses. Building upon this foundation, in 1908, Alice Salomon founded the Social School for Women in Berlin-Schöneberg, offering a two-year curriculum that integrated theoretical and practical training. This institution became a model for social work education in Germany, emphasizing interdisciplinarity, the integration of theory and practice, and an international perspective—principles that continue to define ASH Berlin's programs today.

Though students were mostly from Germany, the school admitted some foreign students, like Rayna Petkova, who would become one of the first professionally trained social workers of Bulgaria. The curricula included both theoretical training and required practical experience. Among the courses offered were family problems, pedagogy, population analysis and change, psychology, social health organization, social work as a profession, youth services, among others. Some of the teachers of the courses, besides Salomon, included Käthe Bonikowsky, Margarethe Freiin von Erffa, Elly Heuss-Knapp, Hilde Lion, Elisabeth Nietzsche, and Helene Weber, among others.

It admitted only women applicants until 1945. It was renamed the Alice Salomon School in 1932 in commemoration of Salomon's 60th birthday. In 1933, the Nazi Party came to power and Alice Salomon was banned from the school and a large number of instructors of Jewish descent were fired. In 1937, Alice Salomon was expelled from Germany and emigrated to the United States. It was not until 1954 that the school reinstated the name "Alice Salomon School".

The school was recognized as a State University of Applied Sciences for Social Work and Social Pedagogy in 1971 and was granted the right to confer degrees, although it once again lost the name "Alice Salomon". In 1991, the 'Alice Salomon University of Applied Sciences' was established as the official name of the university.

== Today ==
The Alice Salomon University is now Germany's oldest and largest training institution of higher education in social work.

The modern university building is situated in the district of Berlin named Hellersdorf, nicknamed "Helle-Mitte" (Bright Centre). The square on which the building is located is named after Alice Salomon. Cooperation between the university and the district of Hellersdorf include community projects involving children and youth and the issue of urban development.

== Study Programs ==
Alice Salomon University of Applied Sciences Berlin (ASH Berlin) offers a comprehensive range of study programs focused on social work, health, and education. The university provides nine undergraduate bachelor's degree courses and four consecutive master's degree courses that build upon these.

ASH Berlin also offers preparatory pre-study programs for international and refugee prospective students who have not obtained their educational qualifications in Germany and are not yet able to apply for a regular course of study at ASH Berlin.

== Campus ==
The Alice Salomon University of Applied Sciences Berlin (ASH Berlin) is situated in the Hellersdorf district of Berlin, with its main building located at Alice-Salomon-Platz. The campus encompasses several facilities designed to support the academic and practical training of its students. In addition to the main building, the university operates a facility at Fritz-Lang-Straße 5, which houses skills labs for the Bachelor's program in Nursing, professors' offices, and seminar rooms. Another location at Janusz-Korczak-Straße 8 accommodates administrative offices and project spaces. The campus is well-connected to public transportation, providing easy access to various parts of the city.

== See also ==
- Universities, colleges, and research institutions in Berlin
- Institute of Technology
