= Ragnar (disambiguation) =

Ragnar is a masculine Germanic given name and surname.

Ragnar may also refer to:

- Ragnar (Minnesota Vikings) (1994–2015), the team mascot for the Vikings football team in Minnesota, United States
- Ragnar Relay Series, a series of long distance running relay races in the United States

== See also ==
- Ragnarök, a series of events in Norse mythology
