= Raya (given name) =

Given name with multiple, unrelated origins in different cultures

- Gender: Primarily female
- Language: Multiple

Origin
- Meaning: Various
- Region of origin: Multiple

Raya is a given name with multiple, unrelated origins in different cultures.

It is a Bulgarian diminutive of Rayna, meaning happy or a Russian diminutive of Raisa, meaning rose. It might also be related to the Latin name Regina meaning queen. It is a short form of Saraya, meaning princess.

It is also said to be an Arabic name derived from ريا (raya), meaning perfume or from راية (rayah), meaning banner or flag. It is also said to be a Hebrew name meaning friend. It is also said to be a Hindi name meaning flow. In Indonesia and Malaysia, the term refers to greatness. The phrase hari raya is used to refer to a big celebration. The word is also associated in that region with rajah, a term used for nobility in India and related cultures.

Raya is also a Galician and Spanish surname that has been said to be derived from a place name or a term referring to a border.

Other, similar, spellings in use in places such as Canada and the United States include Rayah, Rayya, Rya, and Ryah. It is also a masculine given name in different cultures, including the Philippines.

== Usage ==
Raya was among the ten most popular names given to newborn girls in Bulgaria in 2021. It debuted among the 1,000 most popular names for newborn girls in the United States in 2020 and was among the 500 most popular names for American newborn girls in 2021. It ranked in 402nd position for girls on the American popularity chart in 2022. It was noted as a name that had greatly increased in usage there. The name has ranked among the top 1,000 names for girls in England and Wales since 2006. In 2021, it ranked in 203rd position for English and Welsh newborn girls on the popularity chart, greater usage than in any prior year. It was among the top 250 names for newborn girls in Canada in 2021, ranking 240th on the popularity chart that year. The name's rising popularity has been ascribed to the release of the 2021 animated film Raya and the Last Dragon, which featured the titular character Raya.

== Men ==
- Raya Martin (born 1984), Filipino filmmaker

== Women ==
- Raya (died 1921), Egyptian serial killer
- Raya Abirached (born 1977), Lebanese TV presenter and celebrity journalist
- Raya Bozhilova (born 2010), Bulgarian rhythmic gymnast
- Raya Dunayevskaya (1910–1987), Russian-born American Marxist philosopher and humanist activist
- Raya Haffar El Hassan (born 1967), Lebanese politician
- Rayah Marshall (born 2003), American basketball player
- Raya Meddine, American actress of Lebanese descent
- Raya Zeineddine (born 1988), Syrian sports shooter
