= Aplets & Cotlets =

Confection

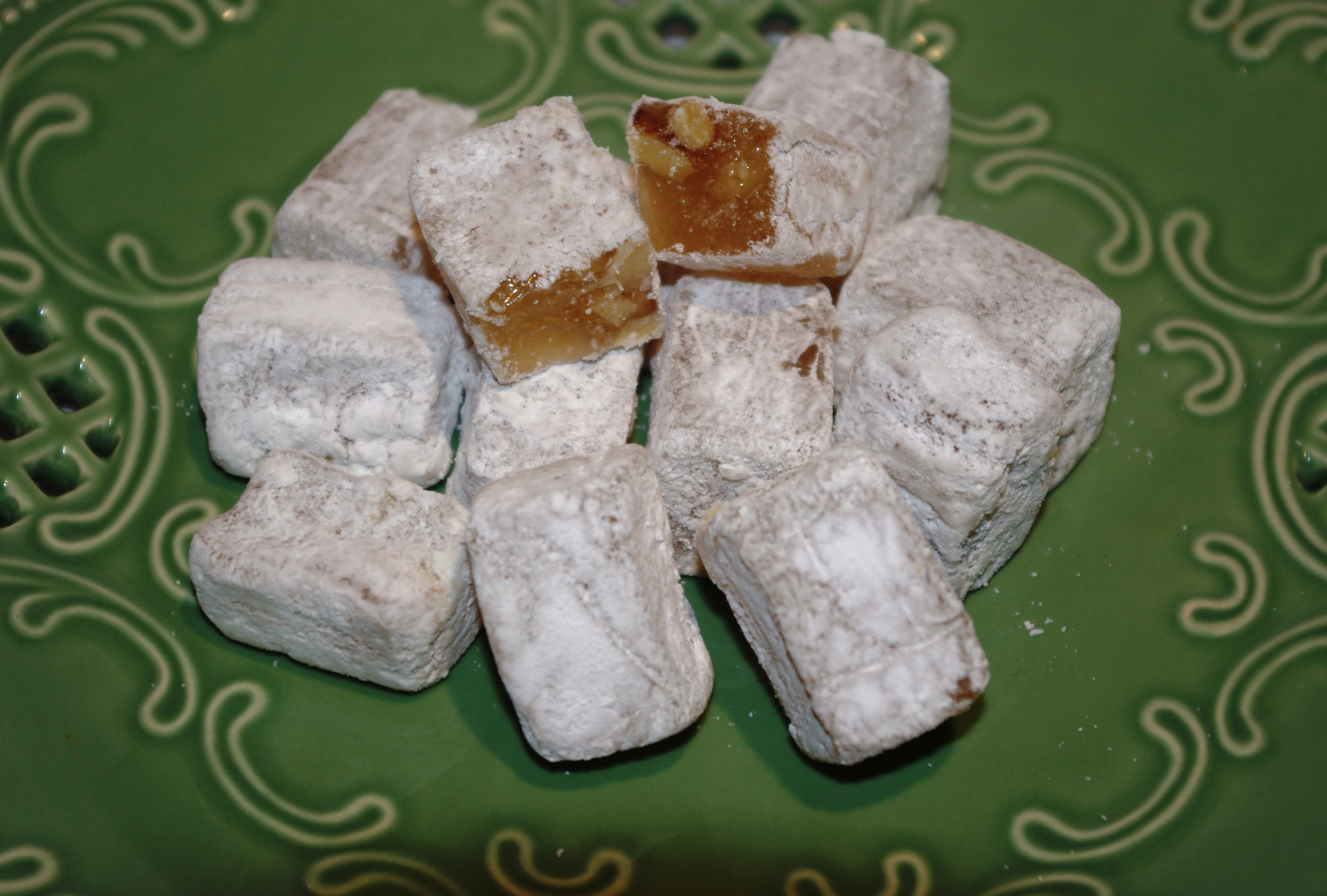
- Type: Confection
- Course: Dessert
- Place of origin: United States
- Region or state: Washington
- Created by: Armen Tertsagian and Mark Balaban
- Invented: 1918
- Main ingredients: Apples or apricots, walnuts, powdered sugar
- Food energy (per 42g [3 pieces] serving): 150 kcal (630 kJ)
- Similar dishes: Turkish delight

Aplets & Cotlets is a confection similar to Turkish delight, associated with the U.S. state of Washington. The candy was first developed in 1918 by apple farmers as a way to dispose of surplus crops. A 2009 effort to legally designate Aplets & Cotlets as Washington's official candy failed due to provincial competition between legislators from the state's two geo-cultural regions.

== Description ==
Aplets & Cotlets are small, jelly-like confections containing walnuts and dusted with powdered sugar. They are similar in taste and consistency to Turkish delight, on which they are based, but the pectin in the fruit acts as a gelling agent. Aplets are made with apples and Cotlets are made with apricots.

== History ==
=== Development ===
Apples have traditionally been the most important cash crop in Washington. By the 1920s, the state had become the leading producer of apples in the United States. In 2003, Washington produced more apples than the rest of the United States combined. In the early 20th century, Armen Tertsagian and Mark Balaban, Armenian immigrants and proprietors of an apple orchard in Cashmere, Washington, began producing Aplets to make use of their surplus crops and earn extra income during the winter. Their inspiration for the candy came from their faint recollections of eating Turkish delight as children. Aplets were followed several years later by Cotlets. The candies were originally sold at a roadside fruit stand but gained greater attention in 1962 as a result of the Seattle World's Fair.

Manufactured versions of the candy are limited to those produced by Liberty Orchards of Cashmere, Tertsagian and Balaban's original company. According to the firm, there is "not a huge market" for the product outside Washington, though in the late 1990s, the company began limited retailing at national chain stores such as Target (the bulk of Aplet & Cotlet sales before this had been in local retailers like Frederick & Nelson, Bartell Drugs, and Pay 'n Save, and through its mail-order catalog). Despite their obscurity nationally, they are available at many farmstead-style shops west of the Rocky Mountains. Recipes for homemade versions also exist.

Liberty Orchards announced that they would cease operations in June 2021 after an unsuccessful attempt to find a buyer for the company. The company was sold to KDV Group, a Russian food conglomerate, allowing for production to continue.

=== Official status ===
In 2009, members of the Washington State Legislature attempted to designate Aplets & Cotlets as the "official candy of the state of Washington". The measure faced opposition from some who felt Almond Roca or Mountain Bar should receive the honor instead. In its report on the measure, the House of Representatives' Committee on Government and Tribal Affairs claimed that designating the candy as the state's official candy would help strengthen unity between the state's two geo-cultural regions, explaining that Aplets & Cotlets "represents the goal of one Washington – Eastern Washington where much of the fruit is grown and Western Washington where products use transportation links to get to market". The bill ultimately failed to pass in 2009 and after a re-introduction in 2010.
