= Renārs =

Male given name

- Gender: Male
- Name day: 30 July

Origin
- Region of origin: Latvia

Renārs is a Latvian masculine given name and may refer to:

- Renārs Birkentāls (born 2001), Latvian biathlete
- Renārs Doršs (born 1985), Latvian alpine skier
- Renārs Francis (born 1978), Latvian rally co-driver
- Renārs Kaupers (born 1974), Latvian pop singer-songwriter
- Renārs Krastenbergs (born 1998), Latvian ice hockey player
- Renārs Rode (born 1989), Latvian footballer
- Renārs Uščins (born 2002), German handball player
- Renārs Varslavāns (born 2001), Latvian footballer
- Renārs Vucāns, Latvian footballer

== See also ==
- Renard
