= Aristide de Ranieri =

Italian sculptor (1865–1954)

- Born: Aristide Vincenzo Antonio de Ranieri; 28 February 1865; Carrara, Kingdom of Italy
- Died: 4 November 1954 (aged 89); Hôpital Sainte-Anne, Paris, France
- Occupation: sculptor

Aristide Vincenzo Antonio De Ranieri, known as Aristide de Ranieri, (28 February 1865 – 4 November 1954) was an Italian sculptor who lived and worked mainly in France. He produced numerous works in the Art Nouveau style in marble, bronze, bisque, terracotta and plaster.

== Works ==
- Carrier pigeons — 1894 Paris Salon
- Le message — 1896 Paris Salon
- L'Ange du tombeau —1900 Paris Salon
- Portrait de S.M. Victor-Emmanuel III — 1902 Paris Salon
- Exposition Paris-Province — Galerie Georges Petit
- L'Escrime — 1903 Paris Salon
- Au petit Trianon — 1909

Salon des Beaux-Arts

- Tragédie — 1913 Paris Salon

== See also ==
- On French Wikipedia
