= Cashmere, Washington =

- City
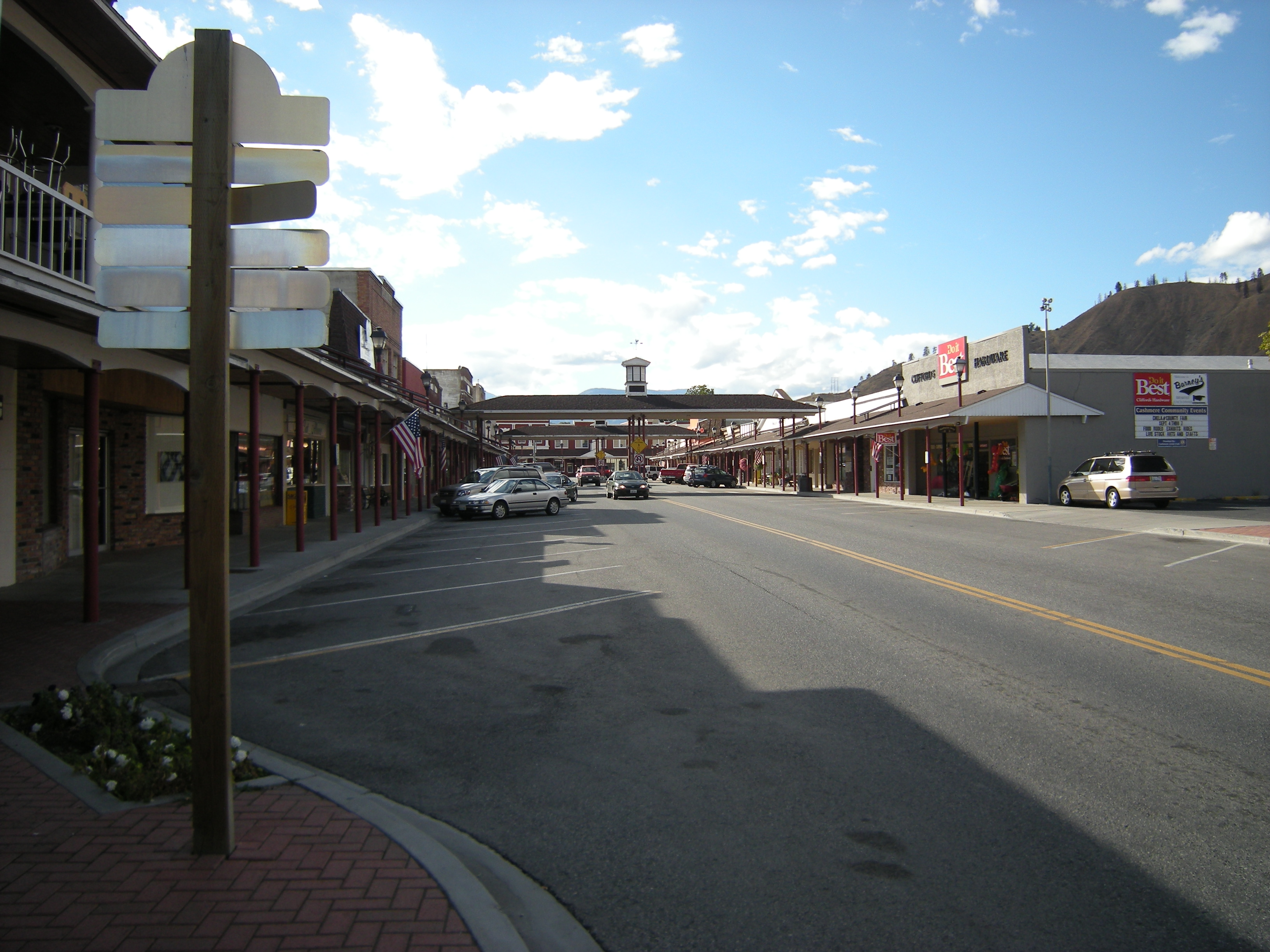

- Location of Cashmere, Washington
- Coordinates: 47°31′03″N 120°28′01″W
- Country: United States
- State: Washington
- County: Chelan

Government
  - Type: Mayor–council
  - Mayor: Jim Fletcher

Area
  - Total: 1.20 sq mi (3.12 km^{2})
  - Land: 1.16 sq mi (3.01 km^{2})
  - Water: 0.042 sq mi (0.11 km^{2})
- Elevation: 879 ft (268 m)

Population (2020)
  - Total: 3,248
  - Estimate (2019): 3,172
  - Density: 2,725.8/sq mi (1,052.44/km^{2})
- Time zone: UTC-8 (Pacific (PST))
  - Summer (DST): UTC-7 (PDT)
- ZIP code: 98815
- Area code: 509
- FIPS code: 53-10495
- GNIS feature ID: 2409405
- Website: City of Cashmere

Cashmere is a city in Chelan County, Washington, United States. It is part of the Wenatchee–East Wenatchee Metropolitan Statistical Area. The population was 3,248 at the 2020 census.

== History ==
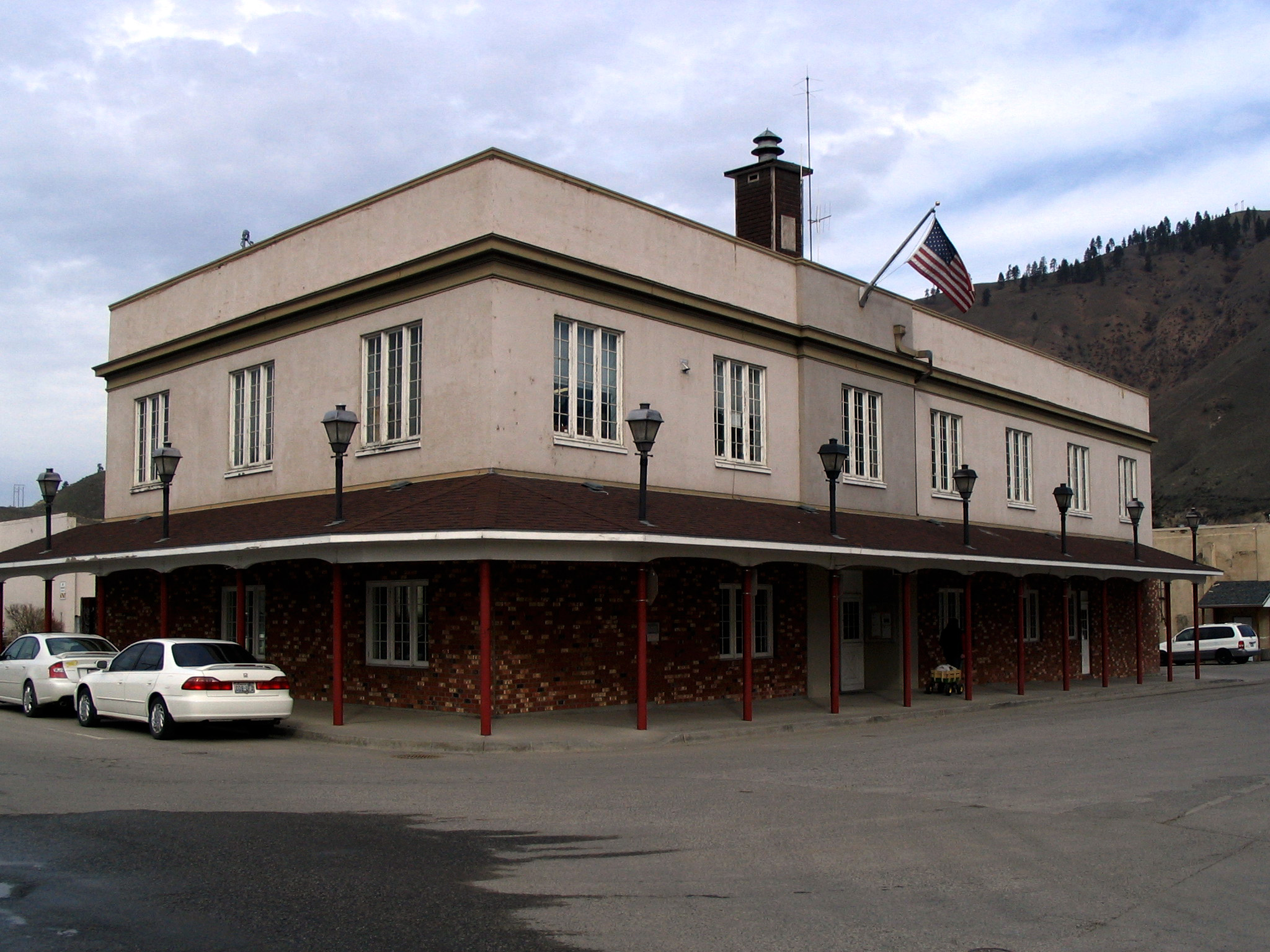
Cashmere City Hall

=== Early people ===
Prior to 1850, the village Ntuatckam was estimated to have a population of 400 on the site of present day Cashmere. The indigenous people are the Sinpesquensi, a band of the Wenatchi people, who were sustained by abundant game and anadromous fish. The Wenatchee River, which runs through Cashmere, was historically home to coho, chinook, and sockeye salmon, as well as steelhead. These wild stocks have been severely impacted by the dams on the Columbia River, although several runs still exist. The Wenatchi people were displaced to the Colville Indian Reservation by the federal government, but still claim some fishing rights in the area.

=== First Europeans and settlement ===
The first European to enter the Mission Valley was Catholic missionary Father Respari, of the Oblate Fathers, in the 1850s. He lived among the Wenatchi people for twenty years teaching them his religion. He was succeeded in the 1870s by Jesuit missionary Father Urban Grassi who built the St. Francis Xavier Mission in 1873. After the missionaries' departure, the valley was next settled in the 1880s by ranchers and squatters. There were enough settlers in the area to necessitate the construction of a one-room schoolhouse in 1886. This sparse settlement was later known as Old Mission, after the Catholic missions of past. George Kline opened the first store further down the valley in 1888 to serve the burgeoning ranch population. A post office was soon established and Kline was appointed postmaster. The town was named "Mission" after the early missionaries.

=== Railroad and irrigation ===
In 1892, it was revealed that the Great Northern Railroad would be building its main line through the valley and Mission was platted between the right-of-way and the Wenatchee River in hopes of receiving a station stop on the new line. It did not receive a station at that time and no boom occurred when the railroad came. Not until 1900 did Cashmere become a flag stop and a small section house was built, staffed by two employees. This small building was preserved and today exists on the property of the Cashmere Museum and Pioneer Village.

The prosperity the railroads brought revived local interest to irrigate the arid valley. In 1892, a stock company was formed with a capital stock of $5000. Local men took out mile contracts to help dig the ditch. At a great personal expense to many involved, the Peshastin Ditch was completed within twelve years. Following its activation, the town as well as the entire area blossomed. Through the 1900s, Mission grew in earnest. The town was becoming a shipping point for the growing fruit and agricultural industry in the valley. Within several years, better rail passenger service was demanded by citizens and a new, larger depot was built in 1903 and is also still standing in its original place.

=== Renaming of Mission through 1920 ===
By 1903 the town's population had reached over 200. Citing confusion of this town with another in northern Okanogan County (that no longer exists), that same year, Mission and the entire valley were renamed after the Vale of Kashmir in Northern India, as local judge James H. Chase claimed it resembled the foothills of that region. The spelling was changed to a more Americanized "Cashmere". Cashmere was incorporated in 1904 and continued to prosper with the opening of the Mission Canal later that year which turned hundreds of acres of dry-unusable land into fertile farm land. Seattle investors purchased large tracts of land in and around Cashmere and constructed the town's first hotel and saloon in 1905. A library was established in 1908 by the town's Woman's club. By 1909, Cashmere housed three banks. Telephone service was installed in 1909 followed by paved sidewalks in 1913, electric lights in 1914 and paved streets in 1919.

=== 1920s–1930s ===
The Cashmere chapter of the Ku Klux Klan was organized in August 1922. Nearly 400 people attended a 1924 meeting at the Cashmere Methodist Episcopal Church. A Cashmere band performed in a parade for the 1926 state convention in Wenatchee.

In August 1931, a pow wow took place over the course of three days to call attention to the unfulfilled treaty agreements to the Wenatchi people, including the Wenatchupam Fishery, and boost the Cashmere economy. The encampment was composed of tipis on the land of Mary Felix, one of the few Wenatchi people living in town, in Yaksum canyon. It was estimated that nearly 700 Native Americans attended, including 250 Wenatchi who traveled from Colville and Yakama reservations. Notable guests included leaders from other tribes and Governor Roland H. Hartley. Proceeds went to restore the cemetery on the other side of Highway 2.

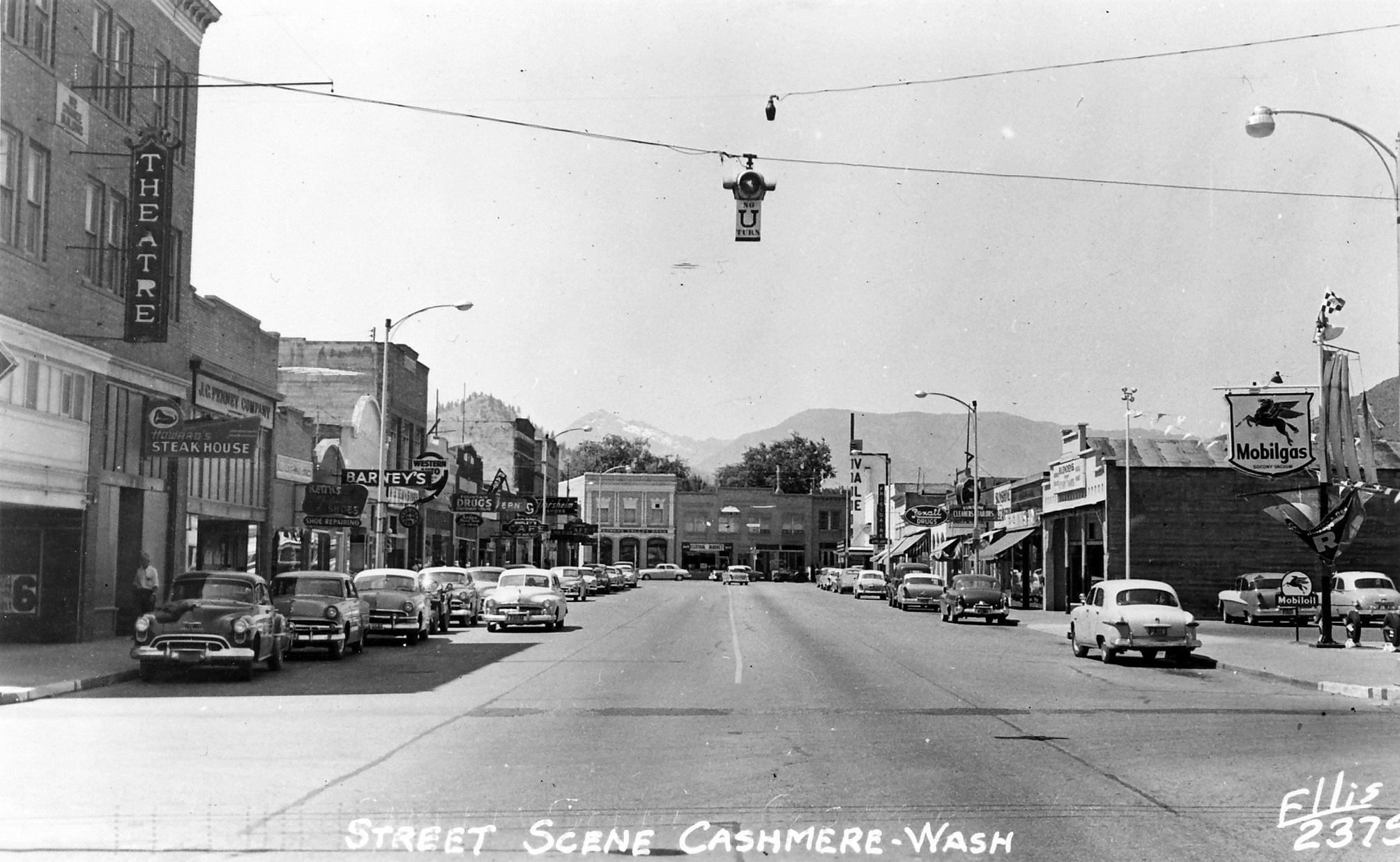
Downtown Cashmere in the 1950s

=== Industries and agriculture ===
The Cashmere area has a rich history of tree fruit production, starting with the first pioneers. With the construction of the Peshastin irrigation ditch in the 1890s, ranches and sagebrush gave way to lush orchards climbing up the walls of the valley. In addition to apples, the soils and climate are ideal for the production of pears, with Bartlett and D'Anjou varieties well represented. Beginning in the 1910s, a number of orchards were opened in Cashmere to take advantage of the area's balmy climate. While many orchards have given way to development, the history of fruit production is still evident in the many orchards and historical fruit warehouses in the area. Overdevelopment is a real threat to the agricultural heritage of the area; the agreeable climate and outstanding scenery attract many people to the area.

The history of the area is also tied to timber production. Cashmere was the home of a large sawmill. The first settlers found abundant ponderosa pine (Pinus ponderosa) and Douglas-fir trees. These timbers were of the highest quality because of the arid climate, which causes the trees to grow very slowly, keeping a tight grain.

== Geography ==
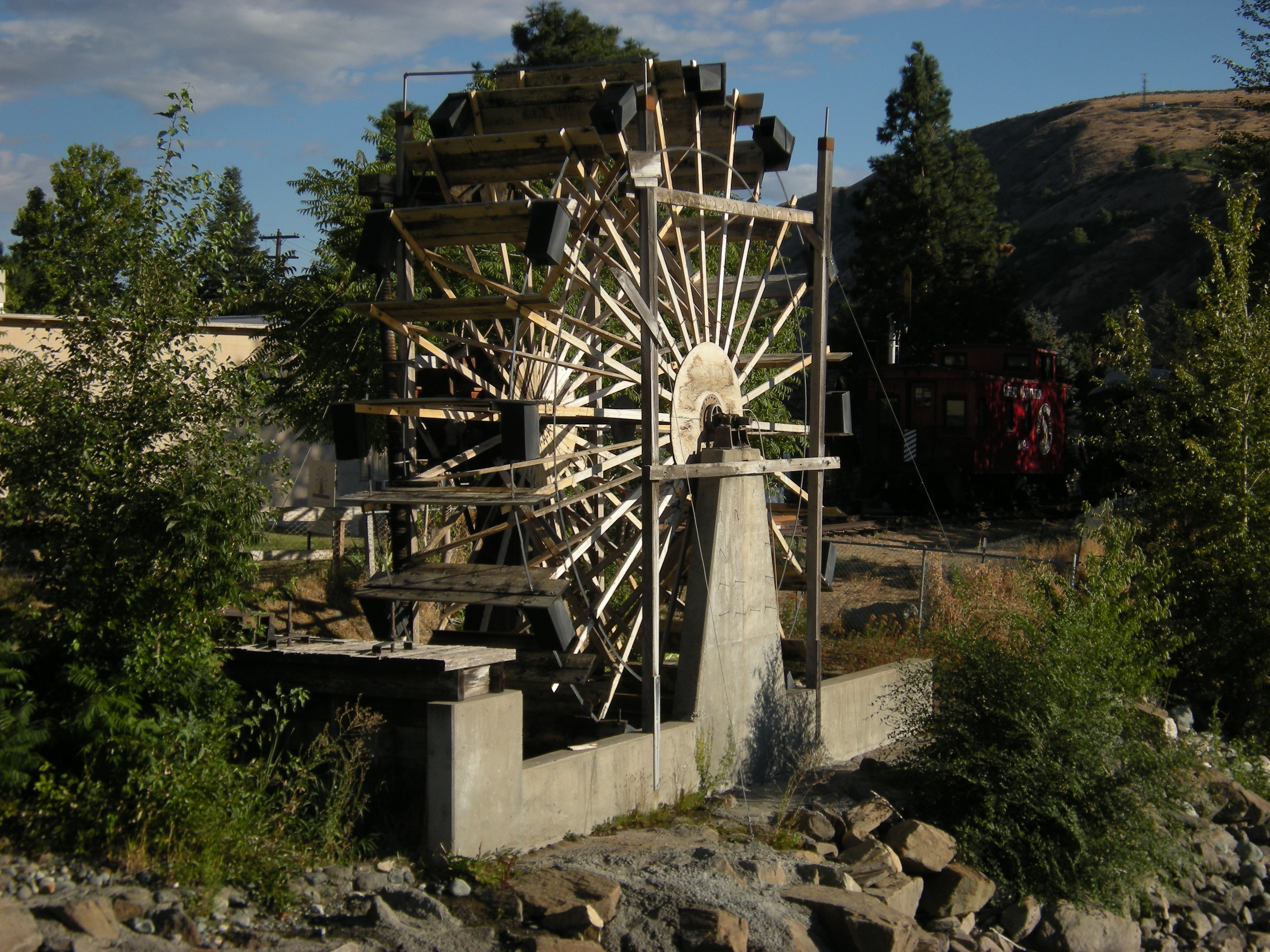
The Burbank Homestead Waterwheel at the Cashmere Museum, listed in the National Register of Historic Places (NRHP)

According to the United States Census Bureau, the city has a total area of 1.07 square miles (2.77 km^{2}), of which, 1.03 square miles (2.67 km^{2}) is land and 0.04 square miles (0.10 km^{2}) is water.

=== Climate ===
This region experiences warm and dry summers that have become increasingly hot during the past decade. On July 4, 2015, the max. temp was 106 F and the mean temp was 88 F (Wunderground.com). According to the Köppen Climate Classification system, Cashmere has a warm-summer Mediterranean climate, abbreviated "Csb" on climate maps.

== Economy ==
Cashmere is home to Liberty Orchards, the maker of Aplets & Cotlets confectioneries. In 1997, the city renamed two of its main streets to Aplets Way and Cotlets Avenue as part of a promotion requested by the company, who had threatened to move from the area. The saga was later included in Naomi Klein's bestseller No Logo as an example of inescapable branding in 21st century America.

Cashmere is also the headquarters of Cashmere Valley Bank, established in 1932 by Hy W. Rieke and H.H. Rieke after the failure of two banks during the beginning of the Great Depression. By 2007 the bank had branches across Douglas, Chelan and Kittitas counties.

== Demographics ==
Historical population
Census	Pop.	Note	%±
1910	625		—
1920	1,114		78.2%
1930	1,473		32.2%
1940	1,465		−0.5%
1950	1,768		20.7%
1960	1,891		7.0%
1970	1,976		4.5%
1980	2,240		13.4%
1990	2,544		13.6%
2000	2,965		16.5%
2010	3,063		3.3%
2020	3,248		6.0%
U.S. Decennial Census

=== 2020 census ===
As of the 2020 census, Cashmere had a population of 3,248. The median age was 39.1 years. 25.5% of residents were under the age of 18 and 18.6% of residents were 65 years of age or older. For every 100 females there were 91.3 males, and for every 100 females age 18 and over there were 88.5 males age 18 and over.

100.0% of residents lived in urban areas, while 0.0% lived in rural areas.

There were 1,163 households in Cashmere, of which 37.0% had children under the age of 18 living in them. Of all households, 48.9% were married-couple households, 17.4% were households with a male householder and no spouse or partner present, and 27.1% were households with a female householder and no spouse or partner present. About 26.4% of all households were made up of individuals and 14.1% had someone living alone who was 65 years of age or older.

There were 1,226 housing units, of which 5.1% were vacant. The homeowner vacancy rate was 2.4% and the rental vacancy rate was 3.1%.

Racial composition as of the 2020 census
Race	Number	Percent
White	2,190	67.4%
Black or African American	9	0.3%
American Indian and Alaska Native	34	1.0%
Asian	29	0.9%
Native Hawaiian and Other Pacific Islander	5	0.2%
Some other race	591	18.2%
Two or more races	390	12.0%
Hispanic or Latino (of any race)	1,007	31.0%

=== 2010 census ===
As of the 2010 census, there were 3,063 people, 1,118 households, and 760 families residing in the city. The population density was 2,973.8 inhabitants per square mile (1,148.2/km^{2}). There were 1,179 housing units at an average density of 1,144.7 per square mile (442.0/km^{2}). The racial makeup of the city was 77.0% White, 0.3% African American, 1.0% Native American, 0.5% Asian, 0.1% Pacific Islander, 18.5% from other races, and 2.7% from two or more races. Hispanic or Latino of any race were 28.4% of the population.

There were 1,118 households, of which 36.7% had children under the age of 18 living with them, 53.2% were married couples living together, 10.8% had a female householder with no husband present, 3.9% had a male householder with no wife present, and 32.0% were non-families. 26.8% of all households were made up of individuals, and 12.8% had someone living alone who was 65 years of age or older. The average household size was 2.66 and the average family size was 3.24.

The median age in the city was 37.6 years. 25.9% of residents were under the age of 18; 9.2% were between the ages of 18 and 24; 23.5% were from 25 to 44; 25.4% were from 45 to 64; and 16% were 65 years of age or older. The gender makeup of the city was 48.5% male and 51.5% female.

=== 2000 census ===
As of the 2000 census, there were 2,965 people, 1,105 households, and 717 families residing in the city. The population density was 3,322.1 people per square mile (1,286.3/km^{2}). There were 1,174 housing units at an average density of 1,315.4 per square mile (509.3/km^{2}). The racial makeup of the city was 89.71% White, 0.54% Native American, 0.30% Asian, 0.07% Pacific Islander, 8.20% from other races, and 1.18% from two or more races. Hispanic or Latino of any race were 17.00% of the population.

There were 1,105 households, out of which 36.4% had children under the age of 18 living with them, 53.3% were married couples living together, 8.9% had a female householder with no husband present, and 35.1% were non-families. 29.8% of all households were made up of individuals, and 15.7% had someone living alone who was 65 years of age or older. The average household size was 2.59 and the average family size was 3.28.

In the city, the age distribution of the population shows 28.2% under the age of 18, 8.2% from 18 to 24, 26.6% from 25 to 44, 20.0% from 45 to 64, and 17.0% who were 65 years of age or older. The median age was 37 years. For every 100 females, there were 88.6 males. For every 100 females age 18 and over, there were 80.2 males.

The median income for a household in the city was $34,854, and the median income for a family was $45,347. Males had a median income of $33,333 versus $25,439 for females. The per capita income for the city was $17,468. About 6.3% of families and 8.4% of the population were below the poverty line, including 8.2% of those under age 18 and 11.9% of those age 65 or over.

== Arts and culture ==
The 9/11 Spirit of America Memorial is a monument in downtown Cashmere that is dedicated to victims and first responders of the September 11, 2001 terrorist attacks. The work includes structural debris from the Twin Towers and The Pentagon. Dedicated in 2015, the memorial shares the site with Cashmere's Veterans War Memorial.

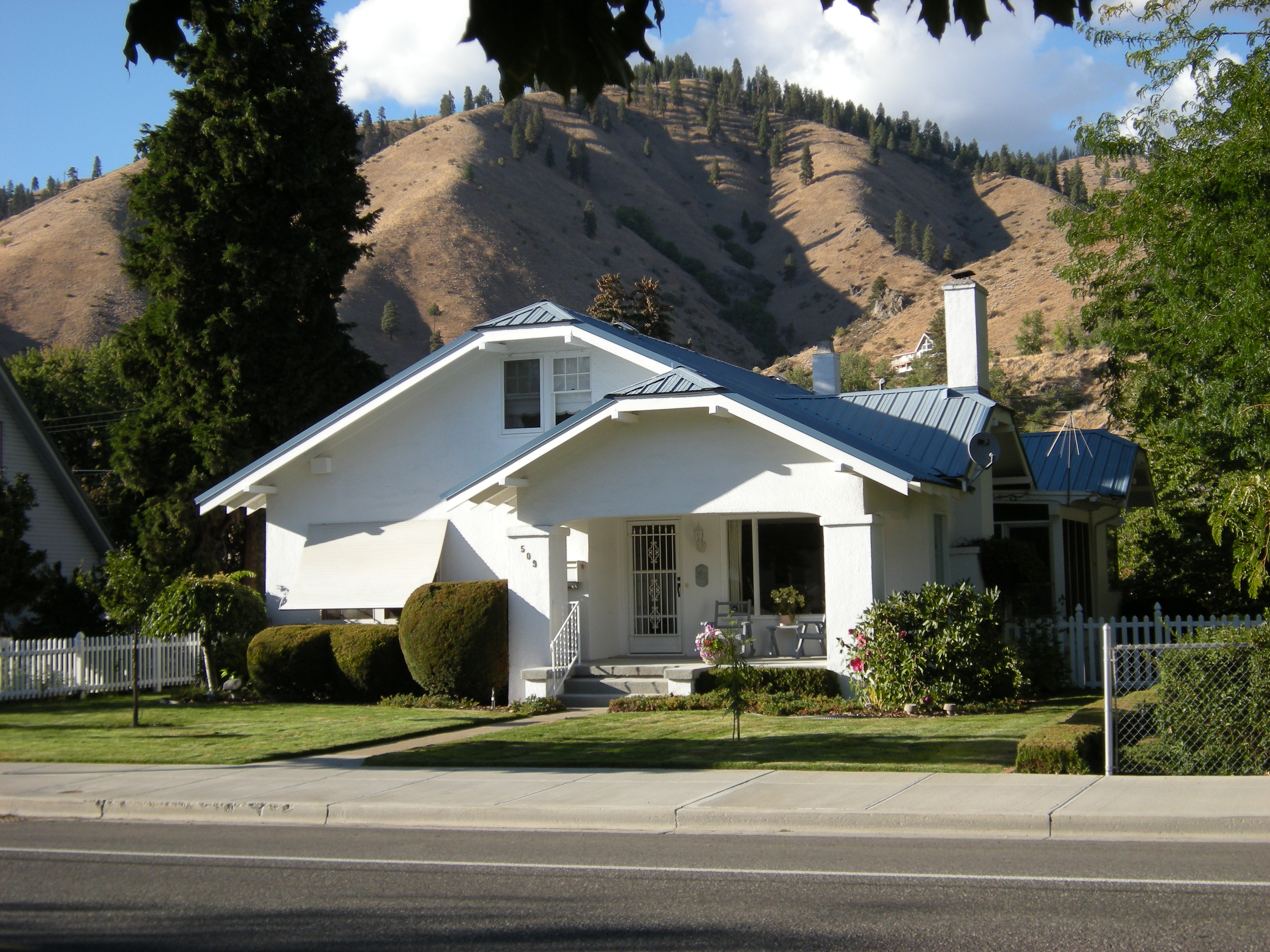
Cashmere's Cottage Avenue Historic District is also listed in the NRHP. Here, the Cascade foothills can be seen behind a Craftsman home typical of the district.

== Recreation ==
Cashmere is surrounded by the eastern foothills of the Cascade Mountains. The Alpine Lakes Wilderness Area is about 10 miles to the West. The Peshastin Pinnacles is a historical climbing area located a few miles from town. Some of America's first technical climbing routes were established here by Fred Beckey and others. The Devil's Gulch mountain bike trail is said to be the premier downhill ride in the state of Washington, and is located just south of town. This ride attracts thousands of mountain bikers from Seattle and elsewhere each year. The Wenatchee river is a popular whitewater destination and runs right through Cashmere. The river provides challenging rapids for rafters and kayakers each spring during runoff, including those occurring in the stretch of river that runs through town.
