= Marcus Ragnarsson =

Swedish ice hockey player (born 1971)

- Born: 13 August 1971 (age 55) Östervåla, Sweden
- Height: 6 ft 0 in (183 cm)
- Weight: 209 lb (95 kg; 14 st 13 lb)
- Position: Defense
- Shot: Left
- Played for: Djurgårdens IF; San Jose Sharks; Philadelphia Flyers; Almtuna IS
- National team: Sweden
- NHL draft: 99th overall, 1992; San Jose Sharks
- Playing career: 1990–2010

Marcus Ragnarsson (born 13 August 1971) is a Swedish former professional ice hockey defenseman who played nine seasons in the National Hockey League (NHL) for the San Jose Sharks and Philadelphia Flyers, and nine seasons in the Swedish Elitserien for Djurgårdens IF.

== Playing career ==
Ragnarsson was drafted by the San Jose Sharks in the fifth round, 99th overall, in the 1992 NHL entry draft. He enjoyed tremendous success paired alongside Mike Rathje in San Jose. During a disastrous 2002–03 season for San Jose, Ragnarsson was traded to the Philadelphia Flyers for Dan McGillis. During the NHL lockout, Ragnarsson retired from the NHL and returned to play in his native Sweden. On 8 November 2010, Ragnarsson officially announced his retirement from hockey due to repeated injuries.

== Personal life ==
Ragnarsson's son Jakob Ragnarsson is a professional hockey defenseman who plays for Timrå IK in HockeyAllsvenskan. Jakob was drafted by the New York Rangers with the 70th pick in the third round of the 2018 NHL entry draft. His nephew Gustav Lindström was chosen in the second round of the 2017 NHL entry draft by the Detroit Red Wings.

== Awards ==
- 2001 NHL All-Star Game

== Career statistics ==
=== Regular season and playoffs ===
			Regular season					Playoffs
Season	Team	League	GP	G	A	Pts	PIM	GP	G	A	Pts	PIM
1986–87	Östervåla IF	SWE.3	28	1	8	9	—	—	—	—	—	—
1987–88	Östervåla IF	SWE.3	25	3	12	15	—	—	—	—	—	—
1988–89	Östervåla IF	SWE.3	30	15	14	29	—	—	—	—	—	—
1989–90	Nacka HK	SWE.2	9	2	3	5	4	—	—	—	—	—
1989–90	Djurgårdens IF	SEL	13	0	2	2	0	1	0	0	0	0
1990–91	Djurgårdens IF	SEL	35	4	1	5	12	7	0	0	0	6
1991–92	Djurgårdens IF	SEL	40	8	5	13	14	10	0	1	1	4
1992–93	Djurgårdens IF	SEL	34	3	3	6	48	6	0	3	3	8
1993–94	Djurgårdens IF	SEL	19	0	4	4	24	—	—	—	—	—
1994–95	Djurgårdens IF	SEL	38	7	9	16	20	3	0	0	0	4
1995–96	San Jose Sharks	NHL	71	8	31	39	42	—	—	—	—	—
1996–97	San Jose Sharks	NHL	69	3	14	17	63	—	—	—	—	—
1997–98	San Jose Sharks	NHL	79	5	20	25	65	6	0	0	0	4
1998–99	San Jose Sharks	NHL	74	0	13	13	66	6	0	2	2	6
1999–00	San Jose Sharks	NHL	63	3	13	16	38	12	0	3	3	10
2000–01	San Jose Sharks	NHL	68	3	12	15	44	5	0	1	1	8
2001–02	San Jose Sharks	NHL	70	5	15	20	44	12	1	3	4	12
2002–03	San Jose Sharks	NHL	25	1	7	8	30	—	—	—	—	—
2002–03	Philadelphia Flyers	NHL	43	2	6	8	32	13	0	1	1	6
2003–04	Philadelphia Flyers	NHL	70	7	9	16	58	14	1	4	5	14
2004–05	Almtuna IS	Allsv	—	—	—	—	—	1	1	0	1	2
2005–06	Almtuna IS	Allsv	38	10	28	38	63	—	—	—	—	—
2006–07	Almtuna IS	Allsv	32	7	19	26	46	—	—	—	—	—
2007–08	Almtuna IS	Allsv	38	5	24	29	44	—	—	—	—	—
2008–09	Djurgårdens IF	SEL	49	12	25	37	38	—	—	—	—	—
2009–10	Djurgårdens IF	SEL	37	5	15	20	44	16	1	4	5	18
2010–11	Djurgårdens IF	SEL	3	0	0	0	4	—	—	—	—	—
SEL totals			268	39	64	103	204	43	1	8	9	40
NHL totals			632	37	140	177	482	68	2	14	16	60

=== International ===
Medal record

Representing Sweden

Ice hockey

World Championships
Silver medal – second place	1995 Sweden	
Silver medal – second place	1997 Finland	

Year	Team	Event	GP	G	A	Pts	PIM
1995	Sweden	WC	4	0	0	0	4
1997	Sweden	WC	11	2	1	3	10
1998	Sweden	OLY	4	0	1	1	0
2002	Sweden	OLY	4	0	2	2	2
2004	Sweden	WCH	3	0	0	0	0
Senior totals			26	2	1	3	16
