= Reginheri =

9th century Viking leader

Reginheri was a Viking leader in the early 9th century.

Reginheri is mentioned in Latin Frankish sources as the leader of a group of Vikings who in 845 raided Paris in West Francia. He is mentioned in the Annals of Xanten in the entry for the year 845, while the entry for the year 845 in the Annals of Saint Bertin does not mention him by name.

In March 845, Regenheri attacked Paris with a large fleet. Having defeated a West Frankish military force he was free to move on Paris. Charles the Bald, the king of West Francia, was compelled to pay 7,000 pounds of silver for the Vikings to withdraw. Reginheri was probably allied with the Danish king Horik I, but no details about him are known. According to the Annals of Xanten, he was said to have been killed in 845. It is probable that the Raginarius mentioned by Rimbert is identical to Reginheri. It is often assumed that Reginheri represents the historical core of the story of Ragnar Lodbrok.

== Sources ==
- Gwyn Jones: A History of the Vikings. 2. Aufl. Oxford 1984, S. 212f.
- Rory McTurk: Ragnarr Lodbrok in the Irish Annals? In: Proceedings of the Seventh Viking Congress. Dublin 1976, S. 93–123.
- Donnchadh Ó Corráin: High-Kings, Vikings and other Kings. In: Irish Historical Studies 22, 1979, S. 283–323.
