= Regine =

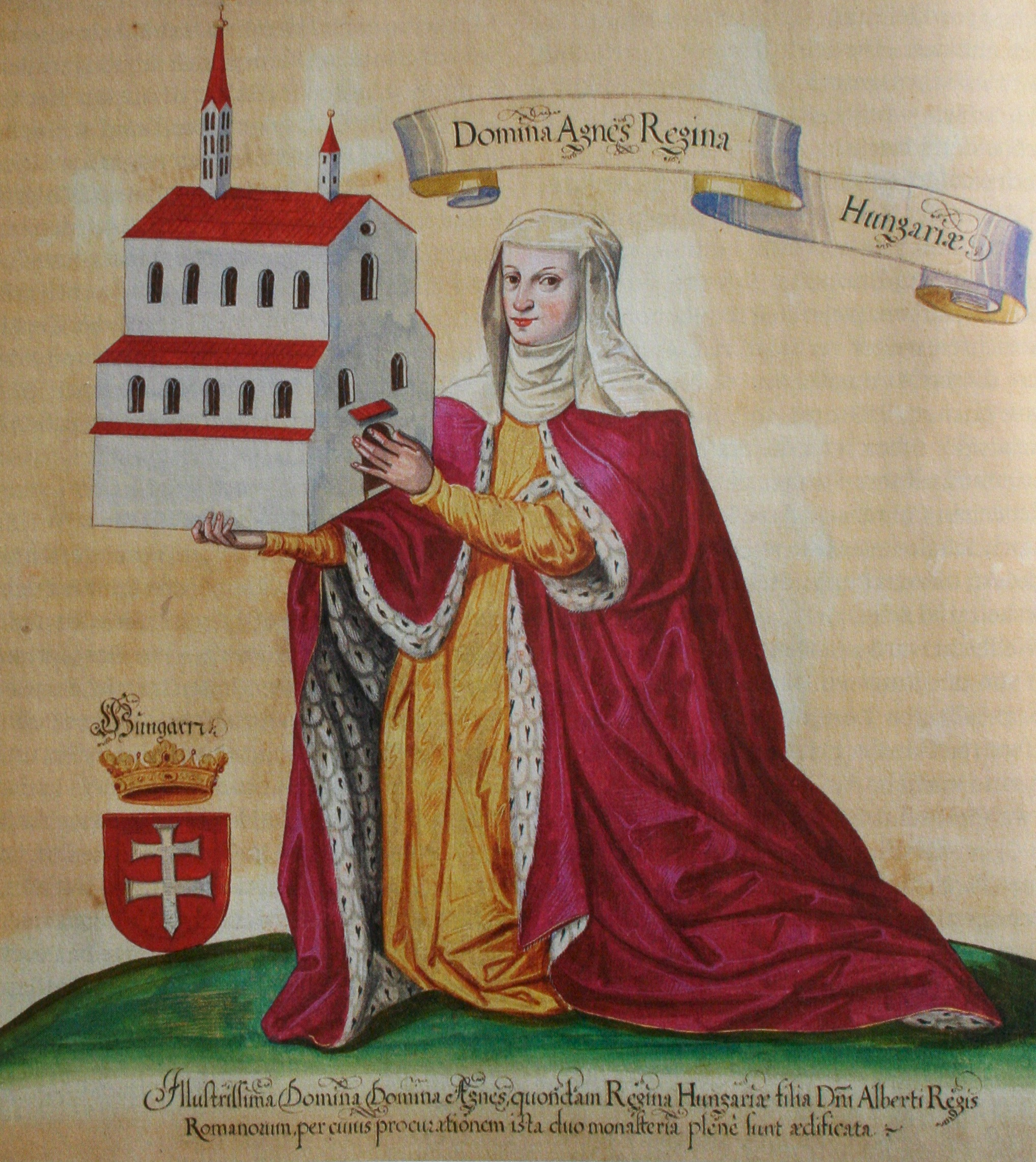

Regine (English: /rɪˈdʒiːn/ rij-EEN, German: [ʁeˈɡiːnə]) or Régine (French: [ʁeʒin]) is a feminine given name, the French and German form of Regina.

People with the first name include:

== Regine ==
- Regine Heitzer (born 1944), Austrian figure skater
- Regine Hildebrandt (1941–2001), German biologist and politician
- Regine Mösenlechner (born 1961), German alpine skier
- Regine Olsen (1822–1904), Danish woman who was engaged to and the muse of the philosopher and theologian Søren Kierkegaard
- Regine Tolentino (born 1978), Filipino-American TV host, actress, and dancer
- Regine Velasquez (born 1970), Filipino singer, actress, record producer, designer and TV host
- Regina Jonas (German: Regine Jonas) (1902–1944), German woman who became the first female rabbi
- Regine Bakenecker (born 1993), German pole vaulter

== Régine ==
- Régine Chassagne (born 1976), Canadian musician and founding member of the band Arcade Fire
- Régine Crespin (1927–2007), French opera soprano
- Régine Deforges (1935–2014), French author, editor, director and playwright
- Régine Gordine (1915–2012), French rally and circuit driver
- Régine Pernoud (1909–1998), French historian and medievalist
- Régine Robin (1939–2021), French-Canadian novelist, writer, translator and professor of sociology
- Régine Zylberberg (1929–2022), French singer and nightclub impresario better known as simply Régine
  - Regine's, nightclub run by Zylberberg
