= Rayna Talinska =

Bulgarian stage actress

- Райна Талинска
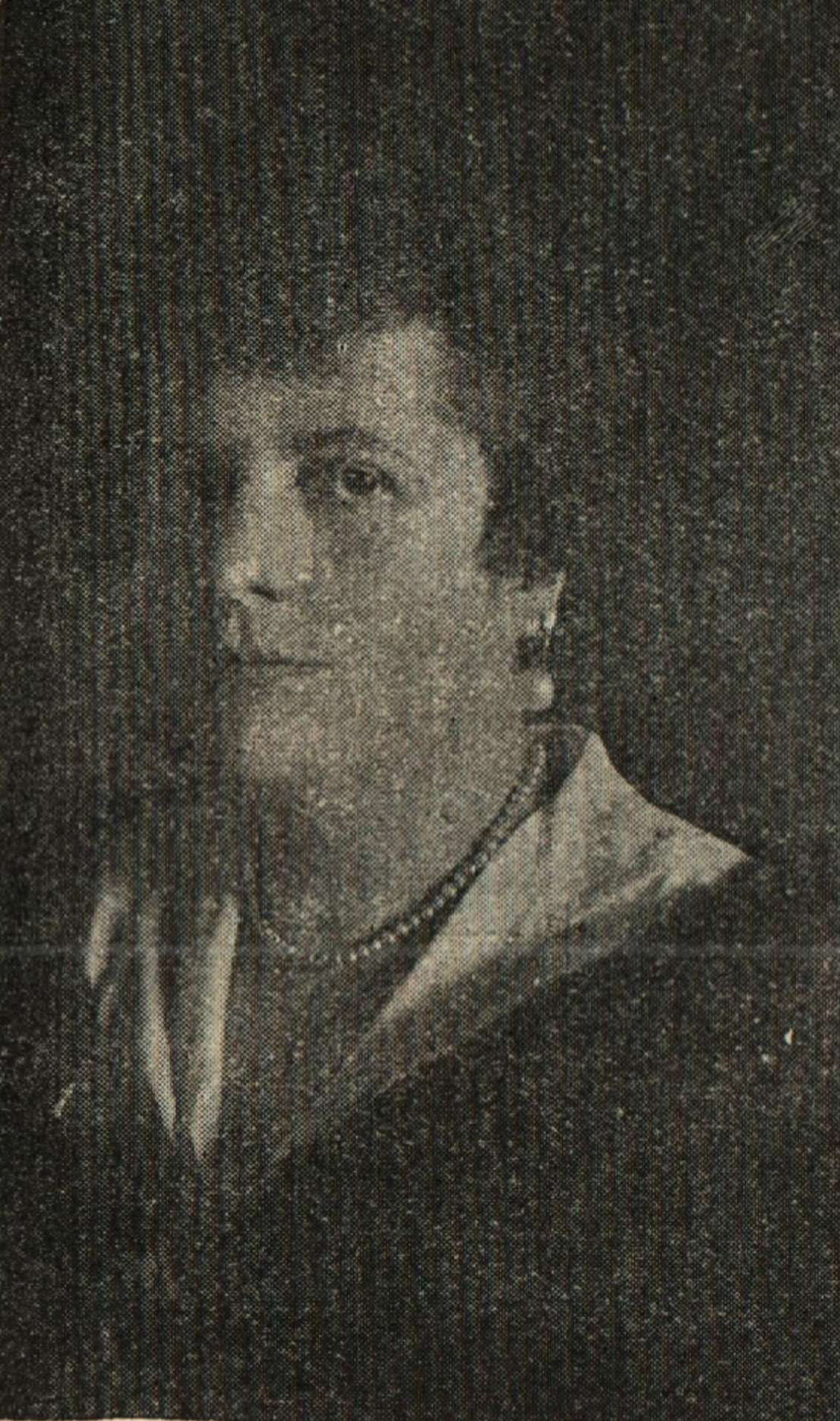
- Born: February 24, 1888; Varna, Bulgaria
- Died: February 12, 1954 (aged 65); Varna
- Occupation: Actress
- Years active: 1909–1930

Rayna Ilieva Kircheva-Talinska (Bulgarian: Райна Илиева Кирчева-Талинска) (February 24, 1888 – February 12, 1954) was a Bulgarian stage actress.

== Biography ==
Raina Talinska was born in Varna on February 24, 1888. She received her secondary education in Sofia and after graduation entered the Faculty of History and Philology of Sofia University. In 1907, she began studying at the Drama School of Emanuel Reicher in Berlin.

Talinska made her stage debut in the role of Luise Miller in Friedrich Schiller's play Intrigue and Love. Her debut on the stage of the National Theater of Bulgaria was in 1909, playing Tamara in Ivan Vazov's play Boryslav. Talinska remained part of the company of the National Theatre for more than twenty years, from 1909 to 1930. Her more prominent roles include:

- Fergova in Millionaire by Yordan Yovkov
- Natasha in Three Sisters by Anton Chekhov
- Anya in The Cherry Orchard by Anton Chekhov
- Anna Andriivna in The Government Inspector by Nikolai Gogol
- Mistress Quickly in Henry IV by William Shakespeare
- Rada in Masons by Petko Todorov

Talinska died in Sofia on February 12, 1954, aged 65.
