= Ranieri =

Italian surname and given name

Ranieri is an Italian surname and given name originated from the masculine Germanic given name Ragnar (Old Norse Ragnarr).

== Surname ==
- Antony Ranieri (born 1977), Professional footballer
- Claudio Ranieri (born 1951), Italian professional football player and manager
- Jeff Ranieri (born 1978), American meteorologist
- Katyna Ranieri (b. 1928, d. 2018), Italian singer
- Lewis Ranieri (born 1947), American bond trader, pioneer of securitization
- Massimo Ranieri (born 1951), Italian pop singer and actor
- Miranda Ranieri (born 1986), Canadian squash player
- Nik Ranieri (born 1961), Canadian animator at Walt Disney Studios
- Sem De Ranieri (b. 1888, d. 1979), Italian sports shooter.
- Silvio Ranieri (b. 1882, d. 1956), Italian mandolin player and virtuoso
- Teodorico Ranieri (b. unknown, d. 1306), Italian cardinal of the Roman Catholic Church

== Given name ==
- Rainerius (c. 1117 – c. 1160), Saint Ranieri, Pisan saint
- Renier of Montferrat (1162–1183), son-in-law of the Byzantine Emperor Manuel I Komnenos. In Italian, Ranieri del Monferrato
- Rainier, Marquess of Montferrat (c. 1084 – 1135), Ranieri I del Monferrato or Marchesato del Monferrato, ruler of the state of Montferrat
- Ranieri, Count Di Campello (1908–1959), Italian equestrian, military officer, sport manager and nobleman.
- Ranieri del Pace (1681–1738), Italian baroque painter
- Ranieri Campello (born 1962), Italian equestrian
- Ranieri of Viterbo (1180–1250), Italian cardinal and military leader, also known as Raniero Capocci
- Prince Ranieri, Duke of Castro (1883–1973), claimant of the house of Bourbon and Duke of Castro
- Ranieri III Grimaldi of Monaco (1923–2005), Prince of Monaco
- Ranieri de' Calzabigi (1714–1795), Italian librettist, famous for his collaborations with the composer Christoph Willibald Gluck
