= Rayna (singer) =

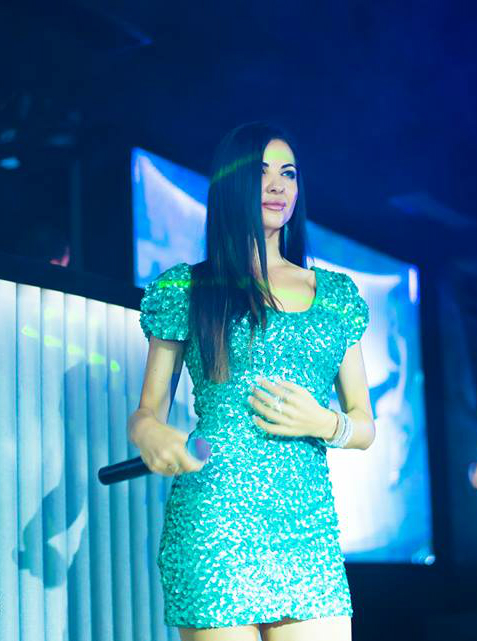

Rayna Kirilova Terziyska (Bulgarian: Райна Кирилова Терзийска) is a Bulgarian pop-folk singer and singer of traditional music. Rayna was born on 30 September 1981 in Sandanski, Bulgaria.

== Albums ==
- 2002 "Dimming flame" (Bulgarian: "Гасне пламък")
- 2003 "Mother, you're one of the world" (Bulgarian: "Майко, една си на света")
- 2003 "Aggression" (Bulgarian: "Агресия")
- 2004 "Good news" (Bulgarian: "Добра новина")
- 2005 "Love on the Richter scale" (Bulgarian: "Любов по скалата на Рихтер")
- 2007 "Rayna" (Bulgarian: "Райна")
- 2007 "Mother, you're one of the world" (Bulgarian: "Майко, една си на света")
- 2008 "Like no other" (Bulgarian: "Както друга никоя")
- 2011 "Macedonian girl" (Bulgarian: "Македонско девойче")
- 2012 "Inside of me" (Bulgarian: "Вътре в мен")
- 2013 "Golden Hits of Payner 17 - Rayna" (Bulgarian: "Златните хитове на "Пайнер" 17 - Райна")
- 2014 "You are beautiful, my forest" (Bulgarian: "Хубава си, моя горо")
- 2018 "Heavy the youth passed" (Bulgarian: "Тежко мина младостта")
- 2019 "One in a million" (Bulgarian: "Една на милион")
- 2020 "Bulgariyo, edna" (Bulgarian: "Българийо, една")
- 2022 "For My Mother" (Bulgarian: "За моята майка")
