= Reyna Pacheco =

American professional squash player (born 1994)

Personal information
- Full name: Reyna Isabel Pacheco Rios
- Born: July 1, 1994 (age 32) Mexico
- Height: 149 cm (4 ft 11 in)
- Weight: 52 kg (115 lb)

Sport
- Country: United States
- Handedness: Right Handed
- Coached by: Natalie Grinham, Renato Paiva
- Retired: Active
- Racquet used: Prince

Women's singles
- Highest ranking: No. 70 (September 2017)
- Current ranking: No. 77 (February 2018)
- Updated on February, 2018

Reyna Pacheco (born 1 July 1994 in Mexico) is an American professional squash player. As of February 2018, she was ranked number 77 in the world.

== Early life ==
Pacheco grew up in San Diego after immigrating from Tijuana, Mexico with her mother and brother at the age of 4. She received her Permanent Resident Card shortly before attending Columbia University, on a Bill and Melinda Gates Millennium scholarship.

== Career ==
White paper publishing [2025]

== In popular culture ==
Pacheco's story was featured in the true stories collection "Little America" from Epic Magazine. and served as the storyline for the second episode of the TV Series Little America.
