= Rayna Petkova =

Social worker (1895–1957)

- Born: 10 September 1895; Veliko Tarnovo, Bulgaria
- Died: 1957; People's Republic of Bulgaria
- Other names: Raina Petkova, Rajna Petkova
- Occupation: social worker
- Years active: 1914-1944
- Known for: establishing the professional field of social work in Bulgaria

Rayna Petkova (Bulgarian: Райна Петкова, 10 September 1895 – 1957) was one of the first trained social workers in Bulgaria. Initially wanting to become a teacher, she was influenced by the women's movement and became interested in social policy. Trained in Germany, Petkova returned to Bulgaria in the early 1930s and helped establish institutions to provide for the social welfare. Publishing widely, her work was influential in defining the role of the state in protecting its citizens and her methods for collecting and analyzing data, particularly on youth, homelessness and crime were not only innovative for the time, but for many years served as the standard for researchers who followed. After World War II, she was ostracized and kept under police surveillance until her death.

== Early life ==
Rayna Petkova was born on 10 September 1895 in Tarnovo, in the Principality of Bulgaria of the Ottoman Empire to the master craftsman and painter, Minchev Petko. The family did not live in Tarnovo long, the ancestral home of her mother, relocating to Sevlievo. Though her family was orthodox and traditional, she wanted to become a teacher. At the time in Bulgaria, there was both a push for and resistance to women's higher education. Petkova persisted in pursuing her training and after completing her grammar school education, she attended the Girls' Gymnasium in Pleven.

== Career ==
Completing her schooling in 1914, Petkova worked as a teacher for two years and then entered Sofia University to study law. Though she was allowed to study, prohibitions at the time would not allow her to be employed in the profession. Among her classmates were Dimitrana Ivanova, who would become a leader in the Bulgarian women's movement and an influence on Petkova. Graduating from university in 1922, Petkova began working at the Ministry of Finance. Though it is unclear when Petkova joined the Bulgarian Women's Union (BWU), her correspondence with Ivanova show that the group encouraged Petkova. Ivanova put Petkova in touch with members of the German women's movement, who helped assist her with fee reductions to enter the Salomon Academy for Social and Pedagogical Work in Berlin. Their letters make clear that Petkova was to gain insight into women's social organizations in Germany and how the BWU might organize such institutions in Bulgaria.

In 1929, when Petkova went to Berlin, she was one of only four foreign students enrolled in the school. Her accommodations as well as the reduced fee for attending the school were arranged by Else Frobenius. Though she had to learn a foreign language, as well as a different academic system, Petkova took advantage of the opportunities to learn from both theoretical and practical studies. She took a wide variety of courses including study of social health, maternity and childhood, pedagogy, psychology, welfare institutions and youth programs. After spending two months working at a police station in Berlin, Petkova returned to Bulgaria in the summer of 1931.

Petkova's first employment after her return was in the Sofia police headquarters working in child protection, but the position was closed. She then took employment as an auditor in the social service office of Sofia Municipality, but by the end of the year, returned to the police headquarters, where she organized the office of protective care. She published articles in a wide variety of journals focusing on pedagogy, police work and women's issues. Most of her articles focused on at risk children and methods that could be used to protect them. She also published extensively on prostitution and the need to train girls in domestic work and other skills that would prevent them from becoming victimized. She advocated for police departments to train female officers as well as social workers for each municipality to assist women. Against the criminalization of prostitution, she instead advocated that pandering and pimping should be illegal but the business transaction should only be regulated to ensure that women were protected from injury and exploitation.

Though Eugenics had gained favor during the Nazi regime and Petkova was aware of the developments having kept in touch with her German instructors, her own research led her to conclude that social factors played a bigger part in human development than genetics. She conducted a study of homeless youth in 1943 which became influential. The detailed statistical analysis evaluated twenty-seven different factors of 404 children under the age of 21, including age, ethnic background, habits, health, family history, marital status, occupation, origin, social class, among others. Her findings indicated that juvenile delinquency was preventable, not in the manner common at the time—forced confinement—but instead through social therapy and re-education.

After the Bulgarian coup d'état of 1944, Petkova was removed from her position at police headquarters. She was barred from social activities and kept under police surveillance, dying in obscurity in 1957.
