= Rayna Kasabova =

- Райна Касабова
- Born: 1 May 1897; Karlovo, Bulgaria
- Died: 25 May 1969 (aged 72); Sofia, Bulgaria
- Military career
- Allegiance: Kingdom of Bulgaria
- Branch: Bulgarian Air Force
- Conflicts: First Balkan War; Bulgarian front; Siege of Adrianople

Rayna Kasabova (Cyrillic: Райна Касабова; 1 May 1897, in Karlovo – 25 May 1969) was a volunteer pilot and the first woman in the world who participated in a military flight during the First Balkan War in 1912. On 30 October 1912, at the age of 15, Kasabova was an observer in a Voisin aircraft that flew over enemy positions in Edirne. Kasabova threw out Turkish language propaganda leaflets.

Kasabova Glacier on Davis Coast in Graham Land on the Antarctic Peninsula, Antarctica is named after Rayna Kasabova. There is a service road named Rayna Kasabova in Bulgaria adjacent to the Sofia Airport.
