= Jakob Ragnarsson =

American-born Swedish ice hockey player (born 1999)

- Born: 23 September 1999 (age 26) Mountain View, California, U.S.
- Height: 6 ft 0 in (183 cm)
- Weight: 176 lb (80 kg; 12 st 8 lb)
- Position: Defence
- Shoots: Left
- SHL team Former teams: Djurgårdens IF; Rögle BK
- NHL draft: 70th overall, 2018; New York Rangers
- Playing career: 2017–present

Jakob Ragnarsson (born September 23, 1999) is an American-born Swedish professional ice hockey defenceman who plays for Djurgårdens IF of Swedish Hockey League (SHL). Ragnarsson was drafted by the New York Rangers of the NHL in the 3rd round (70th overall) of the 2018 NHL entry draft. His father Marcus Ragnarsson is a former NHL defenseman. Jakob was born in California during his father's time playing for the San Jose Sharks.

== Playing career ==
Ragnarsson made his SHL debut for Rögle BK at the beginning of the 2019–20 season but was returned to Allsvenskan after dressing for 4 games in which he played only about 3 minutes. He was originally loaned from Rögle BK to Timrå IK but it was later decided that he should sign a contract with Timrå IK.

== Career statistics ==
			Regular season					Playoffs
Season	Team	League	GP	G	A	Pts	PIM	GP	G	A	Pts	PIM
2015–16	Almtuna IS	J20	2	0	1	1	2	—	—	—	—	—
2016–17	Almtuna IS	J20	23	4	21	25	16	2	0	1	1	2
2016–17	Almtuna IS	Allsv	2	0	0	0	0	1	0	0	0	0
2017–18	Almtuna IS	J20	1	0	0	0	0	—	—	—	—	—
2017–18	Almtuna IS	Allsv	47	4	9	13	24	5	0	0	0	6
2018–19	Almtuna IS	Allsv	37	0	6	6	36	—	—	—	—	—
2019–20	Rögle BK	SHL	4	0	0	0	0	—	—	—	—	—
2019–20	Timra IK	Allsv	29	1	8	9	39	1	0	0	0	0
2020–21	Timra IK	Allsv	43	1	4	5	28	13	1	2	3	4
2021–22	Almtuna IS	Allsv	50	1	20	21	38	—	—	—	—	—
2022–23	Almtuna IS	Allsv	51	3	15	18	32	2	1	0	1	0
2023–24	Almtuna IS	Allsv	37	4	6	10	18	—	—	—	—	—
2023–24	Djurgårdens IF	Allsv	14	0	2	2	2	15	1	4	5	12
2024–25	Djurgårdens IF	Allsv	48	1	12	13	29	12	0	2	2	2
SHL totals			4	0	0	0	0	—	—	—	—	—
