= Radka =

Radka is female given name. Diminutive of Slavic names beginning with rad care, joy. Feminine version of Radek. Similar names are Radana, Radimíra, Raduše, Radmila, Radomira, Radoslava. Pronounced RAHD-kah.

== Other variants ==
- Slovak: Radka
- Bulgarian: Radka or Rayka
- Russian: Rada
- German: Radka
- Croatian: Rada, Radojica or Radika
- Serbian: Rada or Radoyica

== Name Days ==
- Czech: 14 September
- Bulgarian: 8 November

== Famous bearers ==
- Radka Bártová, Slovak figure skater
- Radka Brožková, Czech orienteering competitor, bronze medallist from the world
- Radka Fišarová, Czech jazz singer
- Radka Kovaříková, Czech pair skater
- Radka Toneff, Norwegian jazz singer
- Radka Zrubáková, Slovak retired professional tennis player
- Radka Pavlovčinová, Slovak actress
