= Rayna Grigorova =

Bulgarian gymnast (born 1931)

Rayna Ivanova Grigorova (Bulgarian: Райна Иванова Григорова) (born 25 July 1931) is a Bulgarian former artistic gymnast. She competed at the 1952, 1960, and 1964 Summer Olympics. She was born in Varna.
