= Regina (name) =

Regina is a Late Latin feminine name and surname meaning "queen" from the Latin, Italian, Portuguese and Romanian word meaning the same.

== Given name ==
- Regina (given name)

=== Musical artists ===
- Regina (Slovenian singer) (born 1965), Slovenian singer
- Regina Belle (born 1963), American singer
- Regina Richards (born 1954), American singer
- Regina Resnik (1922–2013), American operatic singer
- Regina Carter (born 1966), American jazz violinist
- Regina "Queen" Saraiva (born 1978), Brazilian musician
- Regina Spektor (born 1980), Russian-American singer-songwriter
- Regina Todorenko (born 1990), Ukrainian singer and television presenter
- Regina Encarnacion Ansong Velasquez (born 1970), better known as Regine Velasquez, Filipina singer and actress

=== Actors ===
- Régina Badet (1876–1949), French actress and dancer
- Regina King (born 1971), American actress
- Regina Hall (born 1970), American actress
- Regina Taylor (born 1960), American actress
- Regina Cassandra (born 1988), Indian film actress

=== Athletes ===
- Regina Joyce (born 1957), Irish long-distance runner
- Regina Halmich (born 1976), German boxer
- Regina Kulikova (born 1989), Russian tennis player

=== Politicians ===
- Regina Asamany (born 1927), Ghanaian politician
- Regīna Ločmele-Luņova (born 1966), Latvian politician
- Regina Ip (born 1950), Hong Kong politician
- Regina Weiss, American politician

=== Other professions ===
- Regina Anderson (1901–1993), American writer
- Regina Barzilay (born 1971), Israeli computer scientist
- Regina Brett (born 1956), American journalist
- Regina Benjamin (born 1956), American physician and U.S. Surgeon General
- Regīna Ezera (1930–2002), Latvian writer
- Regina Jonas (1902–1944), German, the first woman to be ordained as a rabbi
- Regina Lopez (1953–2019), Filipina environmentalist and philanthropist known as Gina Lopez
- Regina Lynch-Hudson, American publicist and historian
- Regina Margareten (1863–1959), Hungarian businesswoman
- Regina Martínez Pérez (1963–2012), Mexican journalist
- Regina Moran, Irish engineer and business executive
- Regina Narva (born 1970), Estonian chess player
- Regina Podstanická (1928–2000), Slovak astronomer
- Regina (concubine), 8th century French concubine of Charlemagne
- Regina (martyr), 3rd-century French martyr
- Regina Basilier (1572–1631), German-Swedish merchant banker
- Regina Protmann (1552–1613), Prussian nun
- Regina von Siebold (1771–1849), German physician and obstetrician

=== Fictional characters ===
- Regina, in the video games Dino Crisis and Dino Crisis 2
- Regina George, in the movie Mean Girls

== Family name ==
- Elis Regina (1945–1982), Brazilian singer

== See also ==
- Regina (disambiguation)
- Regine
- Gina (given name)
