= Ragnar Relay Series =

Series of long distance running relay races

Ragnar Events, LLC
- Logo of the Ragnar Relay Series
- Formation: 2004
- Headquarters: Salt Lake City, Utah
- Parent organization: FitLab, Inc.
- Website: runragnar.com

The Ragnar Relay Series is a series of long distance running relay races. Teams of 6 to 12 runners run approximately 200 miles (320 km) over two days and one night. Founded in 2004, Ragnar hosts both road and trail relays across the United States and Canada. With 20 relays in different locations, the Ragnar Relay Series is the largest series of relays in the United States.

== History ==
In 2004, the first Ragnar Relay was held in Utah, running 188 miles (303 km) from Logan to Salt Lake City. The series is named after legendary Viking hero Ragnar Lodbrok.

On January 23, 2013, Ragnar announced their first ever "trail relay" series, the first of which would be held in Zion National Park later that year, in April 2013.

In 2014, Ragnar Events, LLC announced "Ragnar Relay Niagara Ontario", the first Ragnar to be run internationally, though it was later postponed to 2016 to allow Ragnar to better prepare for an event outside the United States.

In 2022, Ragnar was acquired by Newport Beach-based FitLab, Inc., along with several other fitness brands. In October 2026, FitLab filed for Chapter 11 bankruptcy protection.

== Format and teams ==
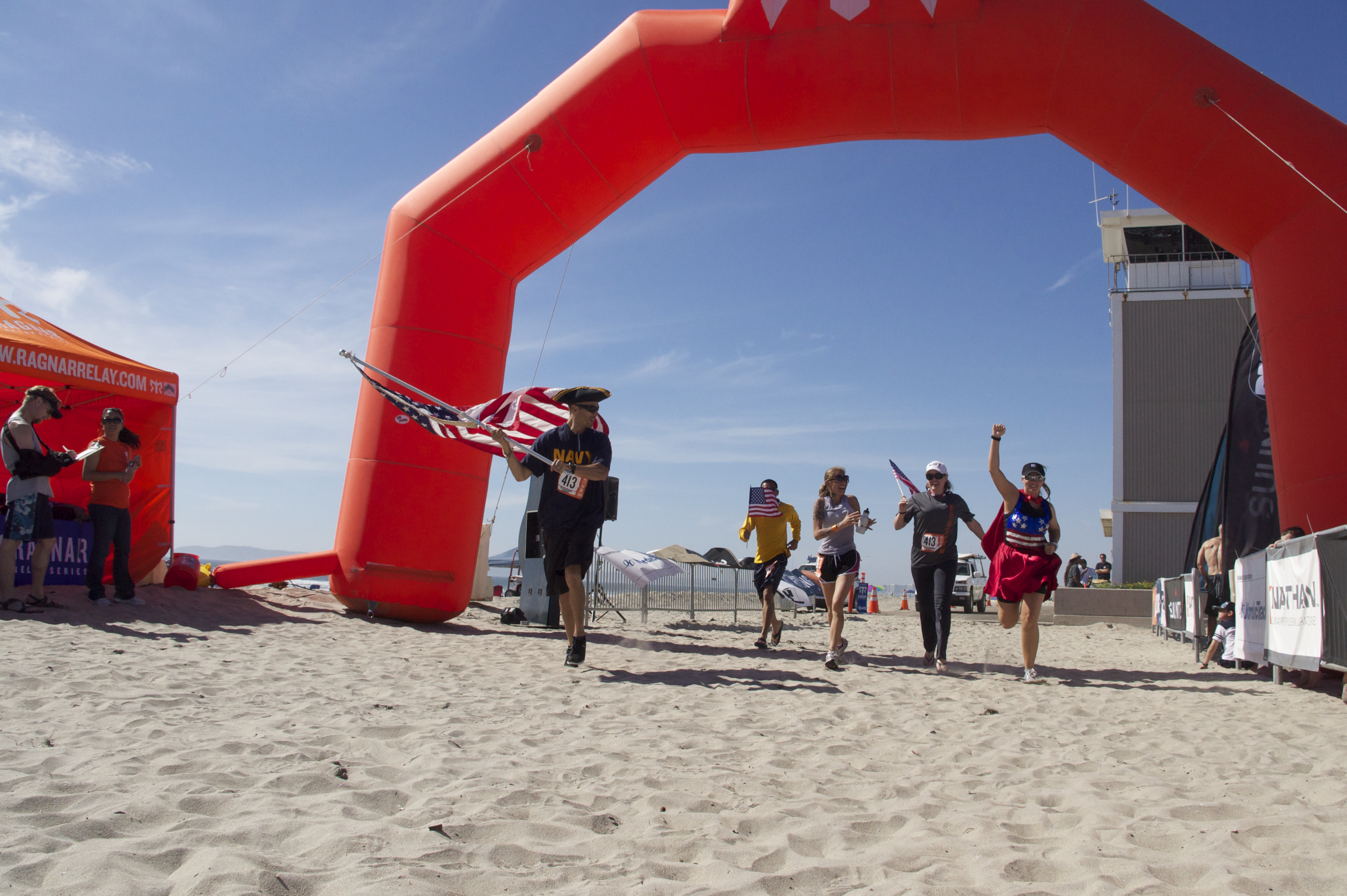
A team of US Navy sailors cross the finish line together at a California Ragnar in 2011

Each Ragnar Relay is approximately 200 miles (320 km) in distance, with races lasting two days and one night. There are two types of teams: regular and ultra. A regular team is composed of 12 runners while an ultra team consists of six runners. As of 2022, the overall team fee for a Ragnar ranges from US$1,300 to over $2,000, depending on the type of relay, but does not include required items such as van rental, sleeping accommodations, and gear for night running.

=== Starting ===
Team start times for the teams are staggered in 15-minute increments, depending upon the pace of the runners on the team. Teams estimate their finishing times by averaging the estimated 10-kilometre (6.2 mi) pace of all runners on the team. All teams must average a 12-minute mile (7.5-minute kilometer) or faster in order to finish within the time allowed. Slower teams will start earlier than faster teams, although later-starting (and faster) teams will commonly catch up to and pass earlier-starting teams during the race. This ensures that all teams will generally finish within a few hours of each other.

=== Exchanges ===
Each team is given a slap bracelet which serves as their baton throughout the race. When exchanging runners, the runner finishing a leg of the race slaps the bracelet onto the wrist of the next runner, who then continues the relay. On a traditional team, the 12 runners are divided between two vans, and only one van will be active at any given time. Once all of the runners from Van #1 have completed their legs, the slap bracelet is handed to the first runner of Van #2. While Van #2 is active, Van #1 is allowed time to rest (and vice versa).

=== Relay legs ===
Race legs vary in distance, with most legs being between 3 and 8 miles (4.8 and 12.9 km) in length. However, some legs can be as short as 2 miles (3.2 km) or as long as 13.5 miles (21.7 km). Individual runners may run shorter legs, longer legs, or a mixture of the two.

Each runner on a regular team is responsible for running three legs of the race with each leg ranging between 3 and 14 miles (4.8 and 22.5 km). The total distance a runner is responsible for ranges between 8 and 26 miles (13 and 42 km), making it a good fit for participants with varying skill levels. An ultra runner will run a total of six legs and can choose to run each leg separately or run two consecutive legs.

== Race locations ==
Currently, the Ragnar Relay Series currently include 20 different races held across the United States and Canada. Courses are on both road and trail.
