= Rhinehart =

Rhinehart may refer to:

== Places ==
- Rhinehart Township, Polk County, Minnesota, a township in the United States
- Rhinehart, Louisiana, a community in the United States
- Rhinehart Ranch, a historic home in the United States
- Shelby Rhinehart Bridge, a bridge in the United States

== Other ==
- Rhinehart (surname)
- Holt, Rhinehart & Winston, a.k.a. Holt McDougal, American publishing company
- Invasion (Rhinehart novel), 2016 novel by Luke Rhinehart
- Rhinehart-Rose A-4C Parakeet, a.k.a. Rose Parrakeet, American homebuilt airplane

== See also ==
- Reinhardt
- Reinhart
- Rinehart
- Reinhard
