= Reinhart =

Reinhart is a given name or surname, and may refer to:

== Surname ==
- Anna Barbara Reinhart (1730–1796), Swiss mathematician
- Annie Reinhart (1942–2004), American politician from Missouri
- Art Reinhart (1899–1946), Major League Baseball pitcher from 1919-1928
- Arthur Reinhart (born 1965), Polish cinematographer, film editor and producer
- Benjamin Franklin Reinhart (1829–1885), American painter
- Bill Reinhart (1896–1971), American college sports coach
- Carmen Reinhart (born 1955), American economist
- Carole Dawn Reinhart (born 1941), American musician and educator
- Charles Stanley Reinhart (1844–1896), American painter and illustrator
- Fabio Reinhart (born 1942), Swiss architect
- Friedrich Reinhart (1871-1943), German banker
- Gregory Reinhart (born 1951), American opera singer
- Griffin Reinhart (born 1994), Canadian professional ice hockey player
- Haley Reinhart (born 1990), American singer
- Jake Reinhart, American photographer from Pittsburgh, Pennsylvania
- Johann Christian Reinhart (1761–1847), German painter and etcher
- John Reinhart (born 1981), American poet and musician
- Joseph Reinhart (1851–1911), American businessperson
- Lili Reinhart (born 1996), American actress
- Lucian Athanasius Reinhart (1911–1950), president of De La Salle College in Manila, Philippines
- Matthew Reinhart (born 1971), American writer and illustrator
- Max Reinhart (born 1992), Canadian ice hockey player
- Michele Reinhart, American politician
- Nicole Reinhart (1976–2000), American professional cyclist
- Oskar Reinhart (1885–1965), Swiss arts patron and art collector
- Paul Reinhart (born 1960), Canadian ice hockey player
- Peter Reinhart, American baker, educator, and author
- Roy Herbert Reinhart (1919–2005), US paleontologist
- Sam Reinhart (born 1995), Canadian professional ice hockey player
- Stanley Eric Reinhart (1893–1975), senior United States Army officer
- Tanya Reinhart (1944–2007), Israeli linguist
- Vincent Reinhart (born 1957), American economist
- Werner Reinhart (1884–1951), Swiss philanthropist, music patron

=== Fictional characters ===
- Carlo Reinhart, protagonist of a series of novels by Thomas Berger
- Jeff Reinhart-Denlon, a fictional character from the Saw series
- Jürg Reinhart, fictional character of the Swiss writer Max Frisch
- Dylan Reinhart (disambiguation), several characters

== Given name ==
- Reinhart Ahlrichs (1940–2016), German theoretical chemist
- Reinhart Dozy (1820–1883), Dutch Arabic scholar of French origin
- Reinhart Fuchs (1934–2017)
- Reinhart Heinrich (1946–2006), German biophysicist
- Reinhart Hummel (1930–2007), German theologian
- Reinhart Koselleck (1923–2006), German historian
- Reinhart Langer (1921–2018), New Zealand botanist
- Reinhart Maurer (born 1935), philosopher and professor from Xanten, Germany
- Reinhart Probst (born 1957), professional tennis player from Germany
- Reinhart Steinbicker (1904–1935), German screenwriter and film director

== See also ==
- Reinhart Field
- Regenhard, Reinert, Reinhard, Reinhardt, Reinhart, Renard, Renart, Reynard, Reynert, Rinehart
- Different etymologies: Reiner, Renner, Rennert
