= Renard (surname) =

Renard is a French-language surname derived either from the French form of the Germanic name Reinhart, or from the nickname "Renart" meaning "fox" in Old French. Notable people with the name include:

- Henriette Rénard (d. 1721 or 1722), a mistress of Augustus the Strong, King of Poland and Elector of Saxony
- Marie-Jeanne Renard du Bos (1701 – 1730–1750), French engraver
- Alexandre Renard (1906–1983), French Roman Catholic Cardinal and Archbishop of Lyon
- Alfred Renard (1895–1988), Belgian aeronautical engineer
- Alphonse François Renard (1842–1903), Belgian geologist
- André Renard (1911–1962), Belgian trade unionist and activist
- André Renard (cyclist) (1889–1950), French racing cyclist
- Augusta Öhrström-Renard (1856–1921), Swedish mezzo-soprano opera singer
- Bertrand Renard (born 1955), French television presenter and author
- Charles Renard (1847–1905), French military engineer who proposed preferred numbers
- Christine Renard (1929–1979), French writer of science fiction and fantasy
- Colette Renard (1924–2010), French singer and actress
- Claire Renard (born 1944), French composer and multimedia artist
- Damien Renard (born 1980), French orienteering competitor
- Gabrielle Renard (1878–1959), nanny to the family of the painter Pierre-Auguste Renoir and a frequent model for him
- Gregory Renard (born 1995), better known as DJ Yung Vamp, Belgian DJ and record producer
- Guy Rénard (born 1934), Belgian sports shooter
- Hervé Renard (born 1968), French football player and manager
- Ian Renard, Chancellor of the University of Melbourne
- Jean-Claude Renard (1922–2002), French poet
- Jeffery Renard Allen (born 1962), American poet, essayist, short story writer, and novelist
- Jules Renard (1864–1910), French author
- Marie Renard (1864–1939), Austrian operatic mezzo-soprano, later soprano
- Marthe Renard, née Leblanc (b. 1903), French pharmacist who worked in Marie Curie's laboratory on the separation of plutonium
- Maurice Renard (1875–1939), French author
- Mercedes Renard (born 1975), American actress
- Michel Renard (1924–1988), Martiniquais politician
- Olivier Renard (born 1979), Belgian footballer
- Raymond Renard (1925–2020), Belgian writer and linguist
- Roberto Silva Renard (1855–1920), Chilean military and political figure
- Rosita Renard (1894–1949), Chilean classical pianist
- Simon Renard (1513–1573), Spanish ambassador in France and England
- Veronique Renard (born 1965), Dutch author and Tibet activist also known as Pantau
- Wendie Renard (born 1990), French footballer
- Emil Kio (1894–1965), Russian magician, born Emil Hirschfeld-Renard

== See also ==
- Regenhard, Reinert, Reinhard, Reinhardt, Reinhart, Renard, Renart, Reynard, Reynert, Rinehart
- Different etymologies: Reiner, Renner, Rennert
