= Renart =

Renart is a German and French surname, a cognate of Renard. Notable people with the surname include:

== Surname ==
- André Renart, Canadian rower
- Dionís Renart, Catalan sculptor and astronomer
- Jean Renart, Picard writer
- Luis García Renart (1936–2020), Spanish-born Mexican cellist
- Pierre Renart (born 1990), French designer and cabinetmaker

=== Compound surnames ===
- Claude-François Renart d'Amblimont, French naval officer
- Rosa de Eguílaz y Renart, Spanish playwright and journalist
- Thomas-Claude Renart de Fuchsamberg Amblimont, French Navy officer and colonial administrator

== Given name ==
- Renart Suleymanov, Soviet sport shooter

== Fictional characters ==
- Renart the Fox
- Roman de Renart

== See also ==
- Regenhard, Reinert, Reinhard, Reinhardt, Reinhart, Renard, Renart, Reynard, Reynert, Rinehart
- Different etymologies: Reiner, Renner, Rennert
