= Julius Reinhardt =

Julius Reinhardt may refer to:

- Hank Reinhardt (Julius Henry Reinhardt, 1934–2007), American author, armorer and authority on medieval weaponry
- Julius Reinhardt (footballer) (born 1988), German footballer

== See also ==
- Reinhardt (disambiguation)
