= Wolfgang Reinhardt =

Wolfgang Reinhardt may refer to:

- Wolfgang Reinhardt (producer) (1908–1979), German-American film producer and screenwriter
- Wolfgang Reinhardt (athlete) (1943–2011), West German track and field Olympian

== See also ==
- Hans-Wolfgang Reinhard (1888–1950), German military leader
- Wolfgang Reinhart (born 1956), German political leader; see List of German Christian Democratic Union politicians
- Reinhardt (surname)
