= Reinhardt (surname) =

Reinhardt is a German surname derived from the given name Reinhard (from Germanic ragin, counsel, and hart, strong). Notable people with the surname include:

== A ==
- Ad Reinhardt (1913–1967), American abstract painter
- Alfred E. Reinhardt (1902-1987), American architect
- Alfred-Hermann Reinhardt (1897-1973), German general
- Alois Reinhardt (born 1961), German footballer
- Althea Reinhardt (born 1996), Danish handball player
- Arthur Reinhardt (1893-1973), German actor
- Augustus M. Reinhardt (1842–1923), founder of Reinhardt University in Georgia, US

== B ==
- Babik Reinhardt (1944–2001), French jazz guitarist
- Bastian Reinhardt (born 1975), German footballer
- Benno Reinhardt (1819–1852), German anatomist
- Burt Reinhardt (1920–2011), American journalist and news corporation executive

== C ==
- Carl Reinhardt (1818–1877), German author, painter, and caricaturist
- Cole Reinhardt (born 2000), Canadian ice hockey player

== D ==
- Django Reinhardt (1910–1953), Belgian jazz guitarist
- Dominik Reinhardt (born 1984), German footballer
- Doug Reinhardt (born 1985), American minor league baseball player and television personality

== E ==
- Ernst-Johann Reinhardt (born 1955), birth name of German comedian "Lilo Wanders"

== F ==
- Fritz Reinhardt (1895–1969), German Nazi leader and state secretary of finance

== G ==
- G. Frederick Reinhardt (1911–1971), American diplomat
- Georg-Hans Reinhardt (1887–1963), German general
- Gerhard Reinhardt (1916–1989), East German Communist politician
- Gottfried Reinhardt (1911–1994), Austrian film director

== H ==
- Heinrich Reinhardt (1903–1990), also called Enrique Reinhardt, German-Argentine chess master
- Heinrich Reinhardt (composer) (1865–1922), Austrian composer

== J ==
- Jamila Reinhardt (born 1989), American rugby player
- Janin Reinhardt (born 1981), German television personality
- Johan Reinhardt (1778–1845), Danish zoologist
- Johann Franz Reinhardt (1713 or 1714 –1761), Austrian violinist, see Reinhardt family
- Johann Georg Reinhardt (1676–1742), Austrian composer
- Johannes Theodor Reinhardt (1816–1882), Danish zoologist
- John Reinhardt (1920–2016), American diplomat
- Joseph Reinhardt (1912–1982), French jazz guitarist
- Joseph Franz Reinhardt (1684 or 1685 – 1727), Austrian violinist, see Reinhardt family
- Julius Reinhardt (footballer) (born 1988), German footballer

== K ==
- Karl Reinhardt (mathematician) (1895–1941), German mathematician
- Karl Reinhardt (philologist) (1886–1958), German philologist
- Kassandra Reinhardt, Canadian yoga instructor
- Karl Mathias Reinhardt (1684 or 1685–1727), Austrian organist and composer, see Reinhardt family
- Kilian Reinhardt (1653 or 1654–1729), Austrian 'Konzertmeister' to the court of Charles VI, Holy Roman Emperor, see Reinhardt family
- Klaus Reinhardt (1941–2021), German general
- Knut Reinhardt (born 1968), German footballer

== L ==
- Larry "Rhino" Reinhardt (1948–2012), American rock guitarist in Iron Butterfly and Captain Beyond
- Lousson Reinhardt (1929–1992), French guitarist
- Lulu Reinhardt (1951–2014), French guitarist

== M ==
- Marc Reinhardt (born 1978), German politician
- Max Reinhardt (1873–1943), Austrian film director
- Max Reinhardt (publisher) (1915–2002), British publisher
- Michael Reinhardt (born 1938), American photographer
- Mimi Reinhardt (1915–2022), Austrian secretary, who worked for Oskar Schindler

== N ==
- Nicole Reinhardt (born 1986), German Olympic Gold Medalist and photo model (canoe/kayak)

== R ==
- Richard Reinhardt (born 1957), real name of Richie Ramone, American punk musician
- Richard Reinhardt (author) (born 1927), American writer
- Ruth Reinhardt (born 1988) German conductor

== S ==
- Sandra Reinhardt (born 1967), alternate name of American actress Sandra Dee Robinson
- Stephen Reinhardt (1931-2018), United States Court of Appeals judge
- Sybille Reinhardt (born 1957), German Olympic Gold Medalist (crew)

== T ==
- Tobias Reinhardt (born 1971), German classical scholar

== W ==
- Walter Reinhardt Sombre (1725–1778), German adventurer and mercenary in India (known as "Sombre", "The Shadow")
- Walther Reinhardt (1872–1930), German general
- Wolfgang Reinhardt (producer) (1908–1979), German screenwriter and film producer
- Wolfgang Reinhardt (athlete) (1943–2011), German Olympic pole vaulter

== See also ==
- Regenhard, Reinert, Reinhard, Reinhardt, Reinhart, Renard, Renart, Reynard, Reynert, Rinehart
- Different etymologies: Reiner, Renner, Rennert
