= Jürg Reinhart =

Novel by Max Frisch

Jürg Reinhart. Eine sommerliche Schicksalsfahrt ("Jürg Reinhart. A fateful summer journey") is the first novel of the Swiss writer Max Frisch (1911-1991). It was started during the winter of 1933 and published in Germany by Deutschen Verlags-Anstalt in 1934. Frisch would later distance himself from this juvenile autobiographical work which was not reprinted as an individual novel, although much later it was included in a compilation of Frisch's collected works. His second novel, J’adore ce qui me brûle (I adore that which burns me), referred back to this first novel, being again centred on the same eponymous protagonist.

Jürg Reinhart is a young man undergoing a journey of self-discovery. In pursuit of his purpose he abandons his studies and travels towards Greece. In a Croatian guest house he meets three women, although he is able to love only one of them, the fatally ill daughter of the guest-house owner. As she lies dying he helps her to commit suicide, in a grown-up action that contributes massively to his own personal development. (It must be stressed that although the Hitler government had come to power in Germany at the beginning of 1933, the concept of “euthanasia” had not yet acquired the negative associations which for Frisch’s generation, especially in German speaking central Europe, would later leave the term “euthanasia” widely interpreted as a euphemism for genocide during and after the 1940s.)

== Synopsis ==
At the age of 21 Jürg Reinhart has abandoned his studies, having got it into his head that he should live with a girl friend in Vienna. He has hardly arrived in Vienna before his intentions change, however: he travels on, somewhat aimlessly in a southerly direction, needing to be alone and to figure out a direction for his life. Already in the third week of his travels he finds himself in "Solitude", which is the name of a guesthouse, converted from an old manor house, in Ragusa (today known to English speakers as Dubrovnik). The guesthouse is managed by an impoverished aristocratic woman, the Baroness von Woerlach, originally from North Germany. Jürg enjoys the available summer recreational activities, swimming and sailing, while supporting himself by submitting little articles and reports to a newspaper back home. He is self-confident in his dealings with the world and with the individuals that he meets, storing up their details for possible use in future novels.

Three women at the guesthouse enter into Jürg's life. There is a 39-year-old Dutch baroness, married to a 21-year-old man: she has long been accustomed to cheating on her spouse at every opportunity. Although convention ensures that she and Jürg enjoy one another's company, he resists her blandishments because he knows her attraction to him is directed only towards his young body, and that she does not love him.

Jürg shows more interest in Hilde, the new housemaid at the guesthouse who is aged only 18 and confronts life with particular naivete. They take a sailing trip together during the course of which Jürg's overtures fail to make progress. More generally, he feels a major sense of failure because he does not succeed in doing what comes so easily to all boys of his age: getting close to a woman. This builds his expectations that when he does manage his first intimate encounter with a woman, his life's purpose will be revealed to him.

It is only with the third woman, Inge, the 30-year-old daughter of the guesthouse owner that Jürg progresses to a relationship of mutual affection. Inge has lost her bridegroom and Henning, the brother to whom she had been devoted in the war. She conceals the hurt of her loss beneath a mask of youthful jollity. With Inge Jürg exchanges his first kiss. But even this is not enough to keep him at the guesthouse, and he duly sets off to continue his journey towards Greece.

While Jürg is away travelling Inge's health dramatically deteriorates. Her mother cannot afford to call a doctor, and it is only through the discrete generosity of a new guest, Mrs von Reisner, that Inge can undergo the operation that she needs. However, she develops blood poisoning which is acutely painful, while the doctors now give her only a few weeks to live. A debate unfolds between her mother, her friend and the hospital staff about the possibility and the justification of ending her life through Euthanasia, but in the end no one wants to accept the responsibility for an illegal course of action. Meanwhile, back in the guesthouse, Hilde finally loses her virginity, to Robert, the dandified son of Mrs von Reisner: Robert then destroys her dreams of a life together for the two of them. At the same time Jürg, who continues to be preoccupied with Inge, is still away, having made it to Athens, (rather indirectly) via Turkey. For him, one night of solitude in the temple complex of Delphi represents total happiness.

Finally Jürg returns to Ragusa and the suffering Inge. The next day Inge is dead. Rumours begin to circulate of a possible euthanasia, and the local authorities anticipate the opportunity to proceed against an unloved Austrian doctor called "Heller". Finally Jürg, who is still visiting the guesthouse for several more weeks, and helping with Inge's administrative matters, admits to her mother that he was the one who administered the lethal injection. The mother sees this as evidence of his great love for Inge and keeps his action a secret, while he will have live alone with the knowledge of it. As Jürg travels back to his home country he knows he has grown up. He feels as though he has passed through many years' worth of experiences in just a few weeks.

== Background and context ==
On several occasions Max Frisch himself referred to the autobiographical background of "Jürg Reinhart": "What resulted was a first, very youthful novel which, like many first novels, remained firmly rooted in autobiography". Again, in a conversation with Heinz Ludwig Arnold, Frisch stressed that "Jürg Reinhart" was "a barely disguised autobiography, but viewed as an autobiography it simply was not honest enough".

The novel is based on real events. Early in 1933 Max Frisch traveled to the world ice-hockey championship in Prague, employed as a sports correspondent for the Neue Zürcher Zeitung (NZZ). The planned two week assignment mutated into an eight-month journey, taking in Budapest, Belgrade, Sarajevo, Dubrovnik, Zagreb, Istanbul and Athens. While in Athens Frisch undertook an extended walking tour that covered Corinth and Delphi, before he returned home via Dubrovnik, Bari and Rome, arriving home in Zürich in October 1933. On the Adriatic Sea, near to Dubrovnik there was a real guest house called "Solitude" in which Frisch stayed for a few weeks. It was run by an impoverished aristocratic woman called Woedke who had a daughter named Ehrengard. And there were a Baron and Baroness von Ittersum staying there. Frisch wrote with enthusiasm about his hostess in letters home, as well as a piece for the NZZ that opened with the words: "Actually these Dalmatian days were exasperating: you cannot paint them but must leave the brilliant colours behind when you depart. Letters remain probably the most powerful reflection of the beauty. Never the beauty itself. Never such a light from a cloudless southern sky. For exulatation."

The three-week stay in Greece was a particularly important element in Frisch's own self-discovery, and he sent home a report of the experience, published under the title "Good fortune in Greece" ("Glück in Griechenland"). This idyllic phase in his journey of self-discovery was ended abruptly by a letter he received from his mother dated 16 August 1933 and reporting the death of Ehrengard von Woedtke, the daughter at the guesthouse where he had stayed in Dubrovnik. Frisch returned at once to Dubrovnik and stayed for several weeks to help Ehrengard's mother with the administration and paperwork arising from the death. Later he wrote of this period: "we go through the house where there are old guests and new ones, and everything continues to operate, and we expect to see our Ehrengard. It's grim." Later, in an interview with Volker Hage, Frisch returned to the subject, his memories now mellowed by the passing of time: "It was, though overshadowed by the death of a young woman, a full and happy time", when he had formed a "pure, honorable and devoted union" with the woman. "She was thirty-three, a full-figured blonde, eastern German. And when I went away, on my trip to Istanbul, she died".

Shortly after getting home to Zürich Frisch set down his experiences in the novel Jürg Reinhart. His original intention had been to use the material for a stage play. According to Julian Schütt, this explains to the carefully crafted dialogue section at the beginning of the book in which Jürg is found fending off the advances of a determined Dutch woman of riper years. The novel incorporates numerous journalistic passages which had already been published elsewhere, mostly in the travel articles he had had published in the Neue Zürcher Zeitung (NZZ). Looking back later, Frisch himself recalled: "there was so much text there, that I called a halt to writing more; I simply glued the articles together".

Jürg Reinhart was first published by Deutschen Verlags-Anstalt (DVA) in Germany because, as Frisch himself admitted, he had not at that time found himself a Swiss publisher. In a decade of growing national consciousness there was some criticism that the choice of German publisher was disloyal or "unSwiss", but Frisch as a young man was largely apolitical and continued to be published in Nazi Germany till 1937. For his publisher the young unknown Swiss writer was an excellent travel/adventure writer as can be seen from the subtitles used in the books as published. In 1944 Gustav Kilpper, DVA's general director confessed the "beneath all the monstrosities and horrors of daily life, the people and events about which you write, bring us back to the private and fundamentally unimportant".

== Interpretations ==
=== Genre ===
Most reviewers categorize "Jürg Reinhart" as a Bildungsroman, a training novel or a development novel. The core theme is the development of Jürg Reinhart, even though the novel often switches away from that perspective, especially in the central section where the writer concentrates on Inge's death rather than on the development of Jürg, and although the plot, unusually for this genre, takes place over only a few months. Volker Weidermann, however, spoke of the book as being at one and the same time both a work of literature and a colportage novel (i.e. a work of pulp fiction). Urs Bircher highlights the "sentimental journey" elements of this "travel novel", but he too detected some aspects and structures more reminiscent of "trivial writing" ("Trivialliteratur").

=== Jürg Reinhart, the lead protagonist ===
Urs Bircher describes the protagonist as a sort of "Swiss Parsifal" dressed in the white-red combination of his national flag. His name "Reinhart" symbolises the fact that at the beginning he is still clearly "clean" of sexual experience and this is reinforced by the determination he displays in defending his sexual "purity" at least in the first part of the novel. For Volker Weidermann, too, the novel's focus is on the "pure hero who tries to guard his purity in a dark world". Frisch supports this interpretation with various cliché visions of a woman seeking to seduce the pure young man away from the path of virtue. For Walter Schmitz the "innocent fool" Reinhart carries a "Neo-romantic vagabond soul" and is the "embodiment of the healthy youth". The contrast created in the novel is between Jürg Reinhart and Robert von Reisner who embodies casual loveless sexuality and carnal irresponsibility. That contrast is played out in the differing experiences of Hilde with each of the two young men.

For Walburg Schwenke the novel, in common with all Max Frisch's early work, is in the first instance a presentation of the fundamental existential conflict between the bourgeois life and the artistic existence. Frisch's alter ego, the protagonist Jürg Reinhart, is the social outsider. He remains incapable of handling his relations the baroness or Hilde. Whereas he is inept in social situations, in his dealings with Nature he is perfectly capable of overcoming obstacles. For instance, the sea has a special function for Jürg, and his interactions both with the baroness and with Hilde reach their high point at sea. Contrasting with the social outsider, Jürg, is the socially adept Robert von Reisner. Nevertheless, the depiction of von Reisner never progresses beyond a stereotype, and really serves only to confirm that for Jürg Reinhart, and indeed with regard to Frisch's own decision to pursue self-realisation through literature, there can be no alternative.

=== Contemporary themes and influences ===
Walter Schmitz explains Reinhart's pursuit of a fulfilled life in the context of the "Philosophy of Life", "Life reform" and "Youth" movements that were features, in particular, of German-speaking central Europe at the beginning of the twentieth century. Even the preference for the "simple life" evidenced by traveling to Greece rather than remaining in the more socially constrained "civilisation" of the holiday resort reflects some of these influences. On the other hand, we see the loneliness of the Reinhart the outsider reflected in the guest house which itself exists for strangers - visitors - and carries the name "Solitude". Schmitz finds echoes here of one of Frisch's favourite poems, the "loneliness poem" by Hermann Hesse, "Im Nebel" ("In the fog"). There are several communication failures included in the novel, such as result from letters going unread or a sceptical tone of voice that is rooted in aestheticism. The religious leanings of the woman lead back to thought patterns characteristic of a cult. She ends up playing midwife to the male's ego.

In his biography of Frisch Julian Schütt pointed out how the conclusion of the novel echoes some of the ideas of the eugenics movement which at the time were increasingly mainstream in popular consciousness across western Europe. He sees an example in the statement about the dying Inge "that her blood was used up and should no longer be drawn from her". Again, he highlights the remark "Then boys and girls appear who are healthier and better configured for life", and the injunction "But then one should act with nobility, whereby the last and hardest service to the Fatherland is proven with the extinguishing of a life. This calls to mind the deathly idea of "Destruction of the unworthy life" ("Vernichtung unwerten Lebens“) which was already widespread in Nazi Germany, but which was also being discussed in Switzerland.

Urs Bircher also focuses in on racist elements, whereby the leading characters are presented as Aryan heroic types („arische Heldenpersonal“) originating in Switzerland or Germany, inserted, using a kind of literary "Chiaroscuro technique" into a Slavo-Turkish context of characters identified as "dark skinned", "untrustworthy" or "lazy". In support of this theme, Bircher even finds a passing reference to a "small Jew" with a "dirty neck" encountered in a bazaar. However, Bircher rejects the idea that the novel's depiction of euthanasia can in any way be linked with National Socialism. Rather he sees the euthanasia theme as a measure of the "manliness" that Jürg Reinhart demonstrates in the novel's climactic event. That is also, of course, precisely the interpretation offered by the protagonist himself: "You don't become a man with a woman". You demonstrate your manhood "through a manly deed." And until you do that you will not have reached the top step of your personal development as a man. Jürgen H. Petersen sees the matter differently: "The way this novel presents the issue sounds ever more pathetic and absurd." In Frisch's presentation of "the active life" (des " tätigen Lebens“) as essential to human fulfillment Petersen detects echoes of the nineteenth century philosopher-statesman, Goethe. However, Alexander Stephan attributes the emphasis on "manly strength and maturity" and the "great deed" to nothing more mysterious than the popular mood taking hold across much of Europe during the 1930s.

=== Relationship with the overall body of the author's work ===
In "Jürg Reinhart" Frisch sets out, for the first time, the "identity problem" which his later works would exhibit. Jurg writes in a letter in the second part of the novel: "You see, if I am pushed around by fully-formed people, as you might say being passed from one hand to another, so that each can mold a different version of me each according to his own structures, one ends up being crumbled" This idea of the misshapen image of the self is illustrated in a later episode, in which Jurg is pressured by fellow voyagers on a boat trip into assuming the role of a famous pianist.

Alexander Stephan highlights additional complex themes that were introduced in this first novel, and which returned with new emphasis in Frisch's later works: the autobiographical aspects, the artist as the outsider, the unfulfilled seeking after happiness and love, and with these, in particular, the sea as symbolizing freedom and fulfillment, along with communication of the living and the dead. Volker Hage pointed out the vague guilt with which the hero is left at the end, concerning which no legal process can pronounce a verdict, which is a theme that would return in Bluebeard (1982), Frisch's last novel. Urs Bircher saw "Jürg Reinhart" as the beginning of a long line of more or less fictitious "me-stories" which Frisch would write.

== Reception ==
Frisch's first-born novel was positively received by contemporary critics, almost without exception providing him with adulatory publicity and setting him above other young Swiss writers of the time. In Germany, too, Frisch's work was well received, with such criticism as there was in the newspapers reserved for the Swiss resonances in the use of the German language. Leonhard Beriger missed the "lively intellectual interplay" (den „lebendigen geistigen Austausch“) such as was provided by Jakob Schaffner (a Swiss novelist sympathetic to the political ideology of Germany in the Nazi period). According to Alexander Stephan, the German critics praised "Jürg Reinhart", above all, because of its brilliantly clear commitment to the "Great deed".

Hellmut Schlien, writing in Die Literatur in 1934, thought that the novel showed very great promise, and gave its youthful author what he called "an honest word of encouragement along the way" („ein ehrliches Wort der Aufmunterung mit auf den Weg“). For Schlien the novel exemplified the way that modern literature, by the device of exaggerated psychological dissection within a novel, was returning to a form of archaic epic rendering. He commended "the style and manner of the presentation ...[as]... exceptionally fresh". "The prose, if still somewhat untempered and impetuous, captures with striking immediacy the personalities, their relationships and experiences. Here there are already signs of real style, with a certain pleasing care-free quality, and a strong accompanying nervous tension in the narrative".

In the author's Swiss homeland, too, critical reaction was overwhelmingly positive. Writing in Der Bund, Hugo Marti found "the young Parzival from Zürich" excessively garrulous, but the encounter was nevertheless essentially characterized by sympathy and empathy. Robert Faesi, who had himself taught Frisch at Zurich University, published a supportive review of "Jürg Reinhart" in the Basler Zeitung, and the newspaper nominated Max Frisch as a "Travel talker" ("Reiseplauderer"). Characteristically harder to impress was Eduard Korrodi, the long-standing literary editor of the Neue Zürcher Zeitung (NZZ) (for which Frisch himself wrote regularly) who refused to serialize the novel, insisting that "Jürg Reinhart" was not a novel for the younger generation and that for him personally the subject matter did not seem to be in keeping with the times. Instead, the NZZ published a fictitious interview, and later Korrodi pushed a gloss regarding Frisch, concerning a young author who scanned the windows of all the book shops looking for his own first novel.

The distribution of Frisch's novel soon exceeded 2,000 copies. In December 1934 the Zürich Literature Commission recognized the achievement with a 500 franc award, noting that it was "poignant how the hero grew to manhood by taking a major responsibility to himself," in an evolution of the plot "from the erotic to the ethical". It took Emil Ermatinger to offer in a note the qualification that the work was "an extensive display of a man with a somewhat unnatural soul" Privately, the author received further critical reproof from his friend Werner Coninx. Later Frisch recalled: "He tore into my first-born novel with great love, but with such insight that he sometimes left me with the impression that I understood absolutely nothing about poetry".

More recent scholars and commentators, with the benefit of a little more distance, have accepted Frisch's own criticisms. Volker Weidermann reckoned "Jürg Reinhart" a "pretty dreadful" ("ziemlich schauderhaft") novel. Volker Hage emphasized that the work could not "avoid being characterized as a beginner's novel, but that does not invalidate it as a literary mark of a twenty-three year old author's progress. Above all the novel has been studied as an early exhibition for various themes and thought patterns which would be crystallized and developed in Frisch's later output. "Jürg Reinhart" also offers students at all levels an early excursion into Frisch's characteristic blending of autobiography into fiction

== Reading lists ==
=== Editions ===
- Max Frisch: Jürg Reinhart. Eine sommerliche Schicksalsfahrt. Deutsche Verlags-Anstalt, Stuttgart 1934. (First edition)
- Max Frisch: Jürg Reinhart. In: Gesammelte Werke in zeitlicher Folge. Erster Band (Collected works chronologically sequence: First volume). Suhrkamp, Frankfurt am Main 1998, ISBN 3-518-06533-5, S. 225–385.

=== Secondary sources ===
- Urs Bircher: Vom langsamen Wachsen eines Zorns: Max Frisch 1911–1955. Limmat. Zürich 1997, ISBN 3-85791-286-3, P. 46–51.
- Walter Schmitz: Max Frisch: Das Werk (1931–1961). Studien zu Tradition und Traditionsverarbeitung. Peter Lang, Bern 1985, ISBN 3-261-05049-7, P. 24–37.
- Julian Schütt: Max Frisch. Biographie eines Aufstiegs. Suhrkamp Verlag, Berlin 2011, ISBN 978-3-518-42172-7, P. 141–144.
- Walburg Schwenke: Was bin ich? – Gedanken zum Frühwerk Max Frischs. In: Walter Schmitz (Hrsg.): Max Frisch. Suhrkamp, Frankfurt am Main 1987, ISBN 3-518-38559-3, P. 63–91, zu Jürg Reinhart P. 70–78.
- Volker Weidermann: Max Frisch. Sein Leben, seine Bücher. Kiepenheuer & Witsch, Köln 2010, ISBN 978-3-462-04227-6, P. 45–51.
