= Reynard (surname) =

Reynard is a surname, and may refer to:

- Adrian Reynard (born 1951), English, founder of Reynard Motorsport
- Elizabeth Reynard (1897–1962), American academic
- Grant Reynard (1887–1968), American artist
- Helene Reynard (1875–1947), British economist and college administrator
- Melissa Reynard (born 1972), English cricketer
- Paul Reynard (1927–2005), French-American painter

== See also ==
- Regenhard, Reinert, Reinhard, Reinhardt, Reinhart, Renard, Renart, Reynard, Reynert, Rinehart
- Different etymologies: Reiner, Renner, Rennert
