= William Rinehart =

William Rinehart may refer to:

- William Henry Rinehart (1825–1874), American sculptor
- William V. Rinehart (1835–1918), American army officer
- William A. Rinehart (1846–1922), American politician
- Bear Rinehart (1980–present), American singer

== See also ==
- Rinehart (disambiguation)
