= Rinehart (disambiguation) =

Rinehart is a surname.

Rinehart may also refer to:

== Places ==
- Rinehart, Missouri, a community in the United States
- Rinehart, West Virginia, a community in the United States

== Publishing companies ==
- Holt, Rinehart and Winston, American publishing company
- Farrar & Rinehart, American publishing company
- Rinehart & Company, American publishing company

== Other uses ==
- "Rinehart" (Harvard), a Harvard call
- Rinehart, a character in Ralph Ellison's Invisible Man

== See also ==
- Reinhart
- Reinhardt (disambiguation)
- Reinhard
