= Rinehart =

- Language: English

Origin
- Language: Germanic
- Origin: Reinhardt
- Derivation: raginą + harduz
- Meaning: "counsel" + "strong"

Other names
- Related names: Reinhard, Reinhart

Rinehart is an Americanized surname derived from the German-language surname Reinhardt. Notable people with the surname include:

- Buck Rinehart (1946–2015), American politician
- Cowboy Slim Rinehart (1911–1948), American singer
- David Rinehart (died 1903), American politician from Maryland
- Frank Rinehart (1861–1928), American artist
- Gina Rinehart (born 1954), Australian businesswoman
- Jacob Rinehart (1834–1907), American politician from Maryland
- James Rinehart (Harvard class of 1900), original subject of the "Rinehart!" call
- Joyce Rinehart (also known as Joyce Anderson; 1923–2014) American woodworker, furniture designer
- Marilyn Rinehart (1926-2012), American composer
- Mary Roberts Rinehart (1876–1958), American novelist
- Ron Rinehart (born 1965), American singer
- Terry London Rinehart, American aviator
- William Henry Rinehart (1825–1874), American sculptor
- William V. Rinehart (1835–1918), U.S. military officer, government official, and businessman

== Others ==
- Rinehart, a character in Ralph Ellison's Invisible Man

== See also ==
- Rinehart (disambiguation)
- Regenhard, Reinert, Reinhard, Reinhardt, Reinhart, Renard, Renart, Reynard, Reynert, Rinehart
- Different etymologies: Reiner, Renner, Rennert
