= Reinhardt =

Reinhardt may refer to:

- Reinhardt University, Waleska, Georgia, USA
- Reinhardt cardinal, a kind of large cardinal

== People ==
- Reinhardt (surname)
- Reinhardt Kristensen, Danish invertebrate biologist
- Reinhardt Rahr, American politician

== Fictional characters ==
- Reinhardt (Overwatch), a character from the 2016 video game
- Reinhardt, a character from Fire Emblem: Thracia 776

== See also ==
- Reinhard, a name
- Reinhart, a name
- Rinehart (disambiguation)
- Reynard (disambiguation)
- Operation Reinhard, a particularly deadly part of the Holocaust
