= Reinhardt family =

Prominent Austrian musicians

The Reinhardt family, sometimes spelled Rheinhardt or Reinhard, was a prominent Austrian family of musicians which flourished in the 18th and 19th centuries. The prominent members of the family included Kilian Reinhardt (born 1653 or 1654 – died March 25, 1729), 'Konzertmeister' to the court of Leopold I, Holy Roman Emperor and Charles VI, Holy Roman Emperor; organist and composer Johann Georg Reinhardt (born 1676 or 1677 – died January 6, 1742); the violinist Joseph Franz Reinhardt (born 1684 or 1685 – died Vienna, Sept 27, 1727) and his wife, the soprano Maria Elisabeth Frühewirthin; the organist and composer Karl Mathias Reinhardt (born 1710 or 1711 – died January 31, 1767); and the violinist Johann Franz Reinhardt (1713–1714 – died April 21, 1761).

== Kilian Reinhardt ==
Born Kilian Reinhardt in 1653 or 1654 in Vienna, Kilian was a royal librarian, music copyist, and general musical administrator to the imperial court orchestra of Leopold I, Holy Roman Emperor and Charles VI, Holy Roman Emperor; a position he began in 1683. This was not his first post at court, as a 1727 publication indicated it was his 50th year in service to the court; inferring he began his service in 1777. He was not a performing musician at the court, and was rankled by his treatment as a servant by the court musicians. Appealing to Leopold I in hopes of improving his situation at court, he was granted the title of 'Konzertmeister' in 1699; a designation which clearly gave him higher standing than a servant and placed him above the court musicians in authority.

In 1712 Charles VI named Kilian to the royal commission responsible for the reform of the Wiener Hofburgkapelle, the royal court chapel. This was done in recognition of Kilian's long and faithful service to the court. Further, by this time Kilian was the leading authority on sacred music and liturgical practice in Vienna court chapel; even more than the royal chapel's maestro di cappella, Johann Joseph Fux. In 1727 he wrote the 200 page treatise Rubriche generali per le funzioni ecclesiastiche musicali di tutto l’anno, con un appendice in fine dell’essenziale ad uso, e servizio dell’Augustissima Imperiale Capella; a work which detailed the musical customs of the Wiener Hofburgkapelle. The work is particularly valuable as a historical record for its details of 17th century liturgical customs, music performance practices, and its details of the music used for the Feasts of Jesus Christ and other important days in the liturgical year. Kilian dedicated the treatise to Charles VI with a long forward expressing his gratitude to the monarch.

Kilian Reinhardt died in Vienna on March 25, 1729. He married twice during his lifetime.

== Joseph Franz Reinhardt and Maria Elisabeth Frühewirthin ==
Born Joseph Franz Reinhardt in 1684 or 1685, Joseph was the son of Kilian Reinhardt from his first marriage. In 1706 he became a violinist in the imperial court orchestra of Charles VI. He was also a long time musician at the St. Stephen's Cathedral, Vienna.

The composer Johann Joseph Fux described him as a "distinguished virtuoso" on the instrument, and he had a very high reputation in Vienna. One composition, a Salve regina, is attributed to him. However, some scholars question whether this is a misattribution and that the work was actually composed by his cousin, the composer Johann Georg Reinhardt.

On October 18, 1711, Joseph married the soprano Maria Elisabeth Frühewirthin who was referred to by the moniker "La FrueWirthin". The daughter of court musician Philipp Frühwirth, Maria was a salaried singer with the court orchestra. She performed in the world premieres of multiple operas, including Attilio Ariosti's Amor tra nemici (1708) and La Placidia (1710), Fux's Il mese di marzo conserate a Marte (1709), Pietro Andrea Ziani's Chilonida (1709), and Giovanni Bononcini's Muzio Scevola (1710).

Joseph died in a fire in Vienna on September 27, 1727; two years before the death of his father.

== Karl Mathias Reinhardt ==
Born Karl Mathias Reinhardt in Vienna in either 1710 or 1711, Karl was the son of Kilian Reinhardt and his second wife. An organist and composer, Karl was trained as a musician by his cousin, Johann Georg Reinhardt, who also served as his guardian. Karl began his career as a scholar in the court of Charles VI, Holy Roman Emperor in 1723. On February 6, 1739 he was appointed to the post of court organist in the imperial chapel of Charles VI He remained in that position during the reigns of Charles VII and Francis I; ultimately retiring from that post in 1762.

Karl Reinhardt was also active as a composer of music for the church. Only two extent works can definitely be ascribed to him, a Requiem mass and a litany held in the collection of the library at Kremsmünster Abbey. These works display a smooth lyricism typical of church music in mid-18th-century Vienna. There are also several works signed simply Rheinhardt which may have been composed by him but could equally have been composed by his cousin Johann Georg Reinhardt.

Karl Reinhardt died in Vienna on January 31, 1767.

== Johann Franz Reinhardt ==
Born Johann Franz Reinhardt in Vienna in either 1713 or 1714, Johann was the son of Joseph Franz Reinhardt. He studied the violin with his father and was appointed as a violinist in the imperial court orchestra in 1730. He began working concurrently as a violinist in the orchestra at St. Stephen's Cathedral, Vienna in 1740. The composer and violinist Carl Ditters von Dittersdorf was an admirer of his skills as a virtuosic soloist.

Johann Franz Reinhardt died in Vienna on April 21, 1761.
