= Rhinehart (surname) =

Rhinehart is a surname, an Americanized variant of Reinhardt. Notable people with the surname include:

- Chris Rhinehart, American programmer and video game developer
- Coby Rhinehart (born 1977), American gridiron football player
- Luke Rhinehart, pen name of George Powers Cockcroft (1932–2020), American writer
- Rob Rhinehart, American businessman and principal founder of Soylent
