= University Place (North Carolina) =

Coordinates: 35°55′40″N 79°01′37″W

- Location: Chapel Hill, North Carolina, USA
- Opened: 1973 (original indoor mall); 2025 (Current outdoor shopp)
- Closed: 2025 (original indoor mall)
- Developer: E. N. Richards
- Owner: Ram Realty
- Num. of stores: 50+
- Num. of anchor tenants: 3
- Floor area: 366,000 square feet (34,000 m^{2}) (GLA)
- Floors: 1
- Website: Official website

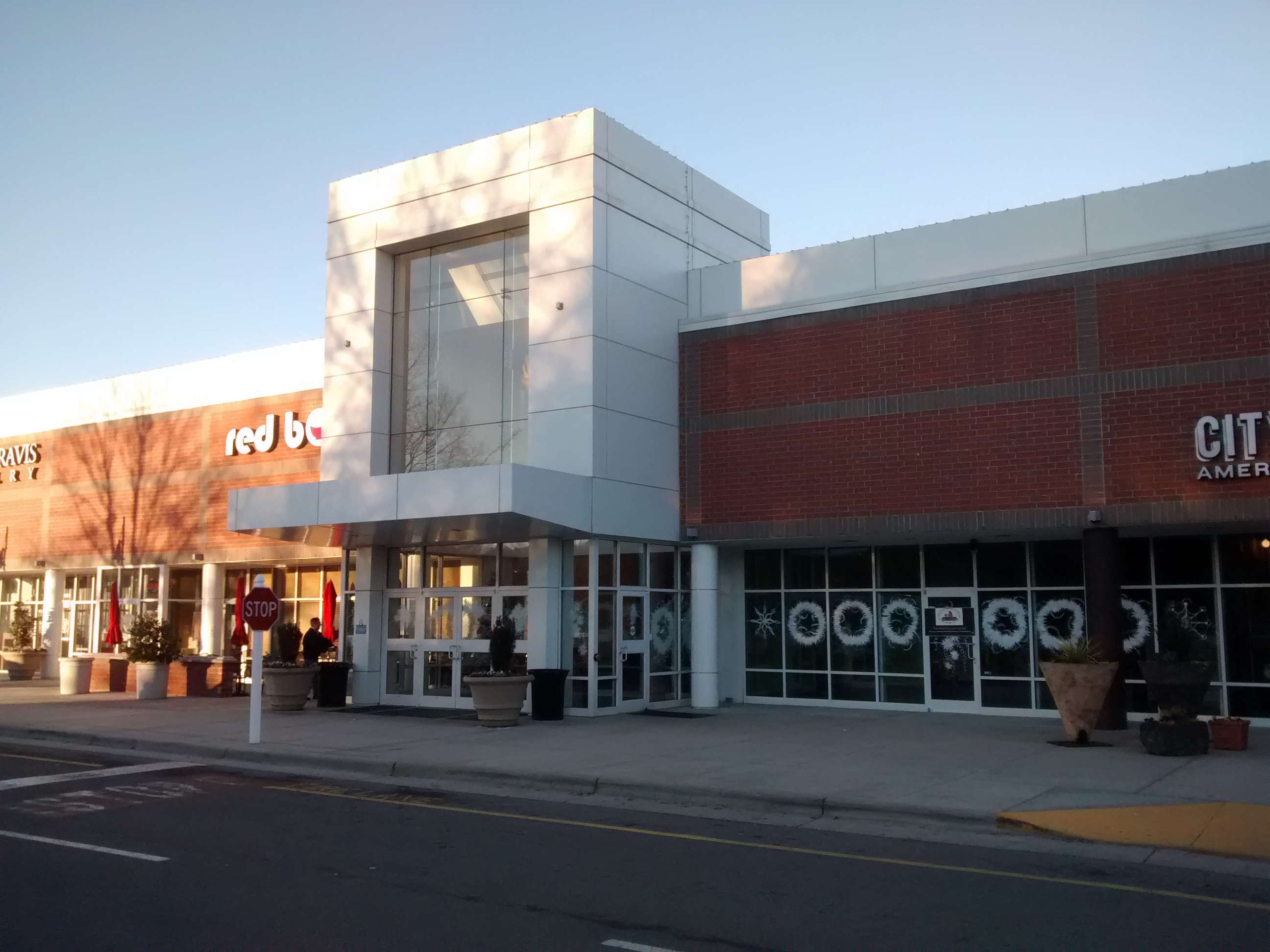
Exterior of University Place

University Place (formerly known as University Mall) is a formerly-enclosed shopping mall in Chapel Hill, North Carolina. The mall is anchored by SilverSpot Cinema.The gross leasable area of the center is 366,000 square feet. The mall is located about two miles northeast from downtown and The University of North Carolina at Chapel Hill. Today, the mall has become similar to that of a lifestyle center that features a mix of national stores, with some local retailers and an apartment community, 900 Willow apartments.

== History ==
The mall originally opened with Ivey's and Belk (Belk-Leggett Horton) in 1973, and Roses Stores as a junior anchor. It was developed by E. N. Richards and originally featured 78 stores.

Ivey's became Dillard's in 1990. In 2002, after The Streets at Southpoint was completed, Belk closed its store at the mall and South Square Mall store in Durham and consolidated both stores into one larger store at Southpoint. Upmarket gourmet retailer Southern Season bought and renovated the former Belk space in 2003. The mall received an exterior and interior renovation 2010.

In 2010, the Chapel Hill Public Library initially planned a permanent move into the mall by taking over Dillard's space. However, Dillard's opted to remain in place and the town rejected the idea of moving the library there, so the library moved into temporary inline space in the mall instead while the current library underwent a renovation and expansion project.

In 2013, several businesses from University Square on Franklin Street moved to the mall itself. The Kidzu Children's Museum was the first, taking over the temporary space of the Chapel Hill Library. Four others soon followed, as William Travis Jewelry, Fine Feathers, and Peacock Alley moved into the former Kerr Drug space. Glee Kids, a children's specialty clothing store, moved nearby. TrySports, a specialty fitness retailer, also opened the same year next door to Southern Season. Fine Feathers is a women's apparel boutique that began operating at University Square in 1976. William Travis Jewelry, a custom jewelry design store founded and owned by William Travis Kukovich, opened in 2002 in University Square. Kukovich's anchor store was 500 square feet, about a third of the size of the store he replaced it with. His new store at the mall, which replaced the store at University Square, opened on September 2, 2013, and is 3000 square feet. Kukovich's last store was ranked as one of the JCK top 50 jewelry designer stores in the country

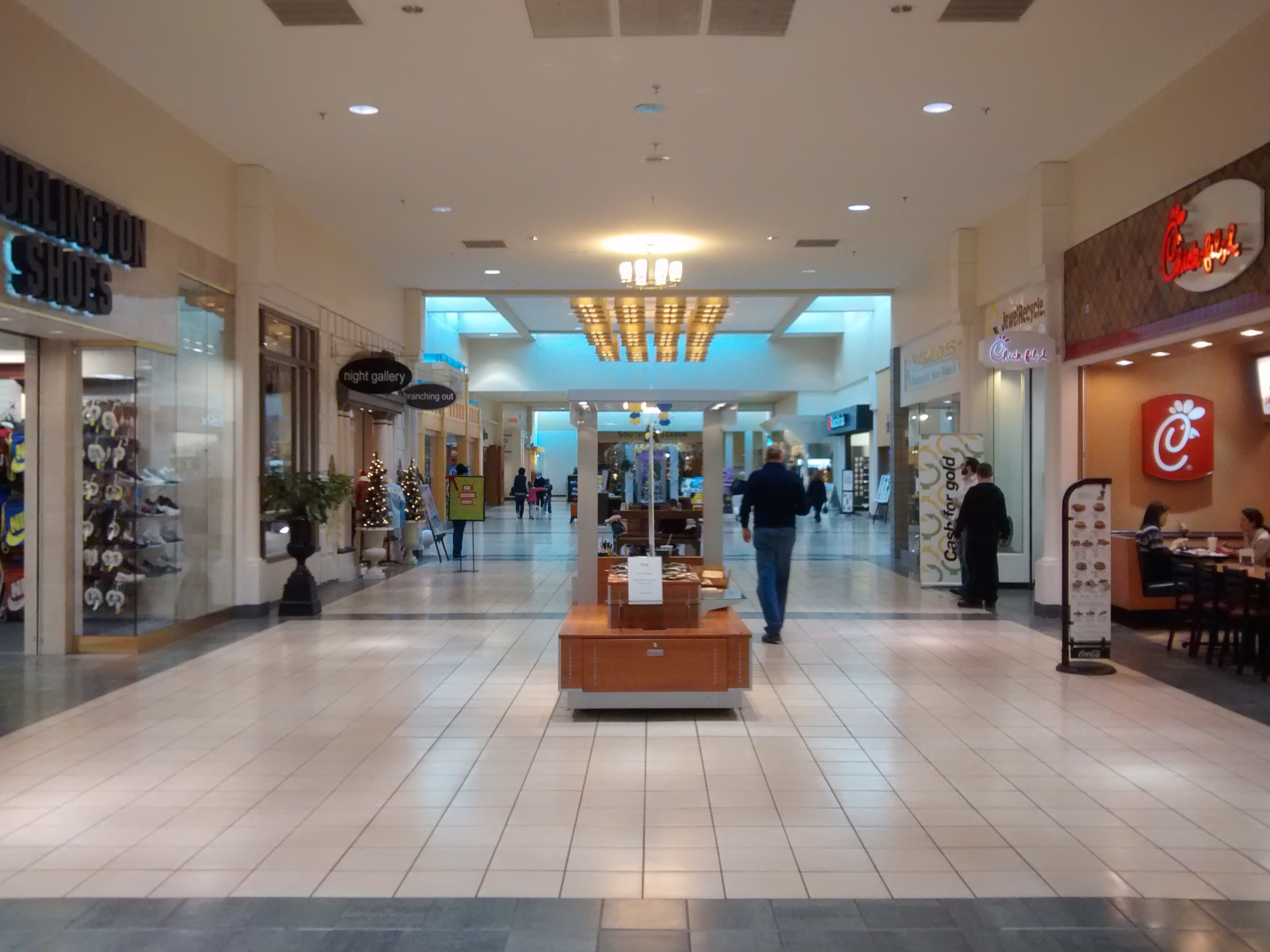
Interior of University Place.

In late 2013, Dillard's closed its store and was replaced with a movie theater. It had been converted into a clearance center. In April 2014, the closure of the Roses store was announced as well.

In late 2014, Madison Marquette announced that University Mall would be renamed University Place. By late 2015, the name change was complete, with a website update along with language referencing the new name, including signage and facades at the mall now being named University Place.

Southern Season closed its store at University Place in January 2020 and shifted its operations to an online business model.

In June 2021, the Chapel Hill Town Council approved a special use permit for a major redevelopment of University Place. As of 2025, the center is entirely outward-facing, resembling that of a lifestyle center, with the addition of freestanding retailers like Jeni's Ice Cream and an apartment community, 900 Willow apartments, with future construction efforts slated for 2026.
