= Peter Reinhart =

American baker, educator and author

- Occupations: Author, baker, teacher
- Website: pizzaquest.com

Peter Reinhart is an American baker, educator and author. He is most known for writing Bread Revolution, American Pie: My Search for the Perfect Pizza, The Joy of Gluten-Free, Sugar-Free Baking and The Bread Baker’s Apprentice. Four of his books have been nominated for James Beard Awards, with three of them winning, including the "Book of the Year" in 2002 for The Bread Baker's Apprentice.

Reinhart is considered to be one of the most respected baking educators in America. He is also the founder of Brother Juniper's Bakery in Santa Rosa, California (since closed). Currently, he serves as full-time Chef on Assignment at Johnson & Wales University.

== Education ==
Reinhart is a graduate of the MFA Creative Writing Program at Queens University of Charlotte. He has an undergraduate degree in Communications, Literature, and Psychology from Charter Oak State College (CT), and spent a number of years as a seminarian and member of the Eastern Orthodox, Christ the Saviour Brotherhood.

== Career ==
Since 2003, he has been the full-time Chef on Assignment at Johnson & Wales University in Charlotte, North Carolina, having taught at the university's Providence campus for the previous four years. For the five years prior to teaching at Johnson & Wales, Reinhart was a full-time instructor at the California Culinary Academy in San Francisco.

Peter has also consulted for many companies, including Amy's Kitchen, Kraft, Pepperidge Farm, Rich's, Frito Lay, and many others, including the development of frozen pizzas, bagels, and gluten-free products. In 2007, in his book, Peter Reinhart's Whole Grain Breads, Reinhart innovated a technique that employed a soaker and a pre-ferment, which in its own way revolutionized the traditional methods that previously required a full 20 minutes of hand-kneading to get the right whole-wheat flavor and texture. Reinhart summarized his findings and baking philosophy in a popular TED talk. He is also on the Chefs Council of The Center for Culinary Development, a culinary think tank located in San Francisco, as well as a consulting product developer for The California Culinary Development Group.

Reinhart has taught educational baking seminars at several places including Draeger's Cooking School in Menlo Park, The Culinary Institute of America, Southern Season Cooking School, The Kneading Conference, The Asheville Bread Festival, and The Institute of Culinary Education. He also speaks to culinary, as well as business, religious, and civic groups, on the topic of bread as a metaphor for personal transformation and self-discovery.

In 2009, he joined Pie Town, an artisan pizzeria in Charlotte, where he served as the creative consultant and introduced a 100% whole grain crust along with a number of innovative toppings and products. He later served a similar role for Pure Pizza, a new "farm to fork" pizzeria in Charlotte.

=== Pizza Quest ===
In 2002, Reinhart embarked on a two-year pizza quest trekking through America and Italy in search of the perfect pie, which he chronicled in his book, American Pie: My Search for the Perfect Pizza. He found that "there's a big difference between good (about 99 percent of pizza out there) and very good (1 percent)" – and a lot of that is due to the crust. Since 2010, he has been the host of pizzaquest.com, where he shares videos, blog entries, and recipes on his never-ending search for the perfect pizza, and also explores pizza as a metaphor for the universal search for meaning and self-discovery.

== Books ==
Reinhart has written ten books and many of his books have also been translated into other languages. In 2002, The Bread Baker's Apprentice won the James Beard Award and the IACP Cook Book of the Year awards, as well as the International Gourmand Award for Best Baking Book in the World.

=== The Joy of Gluten-Free, Sugar-Free Baking ===
In 2012, Reinhart collaborated with Denene Wallace, a baker who specializes in high-protein, low-carbohydrate, gluten-free baking on writing The Joy of Gluten-Free, Sugar-Free Baking: 80 Low-Carb Recipes That Offer Solutions for Celiac Disease, Diabetes and Weight Loss. The book includes recipes for gluten-free, sugar-free breads, pizza, focaccia, crackers, breadsticks, pretzels, breakfast breads, cookies, brownies and cakes and pies. Reinhart first got interested in gluten-free baking because of a friend who suffers from Celiac disease (gluten intolerance). When Wallace came up with the idea of using nut and seed flours in place of the standard tapioca-potato-rice flour trilogy that once dominated gluten-free baking, Reinhart was interested.

The book was reviewed positively. Los Angeles Weekly wrote, "Note that this is not simply a gluten-free book but, as the subtitle explains, one for those on a sugar-free or calorie-restricted diet as well."

=== Bread Revolution ===
Reinhart's Bread Revolution: World-Class Baking with Sprouted & Whole Grains, Heirloom Flours & Fresh Techniques was published in 2014. In the book, he has introduced a new kind of whole wheat flour called sprouted wheat. He first learned about it in 2009 when a local flour miller called to tell him about it and promptly shipped him 25 pounds of the flour to test. Reinhart made multiple breads with the flour and liked the taste. The book features 50 recipes that use sprouted flour, ancient flours like amaranth and quinoa, new alternative flours made from grape skins and seeds, gluten-free breads and a few quick breads. The book also promotes Reinhart's stretch and fold method of bread-making, first introduced in an earlier book, Artisan Breads Everyday.

The book received positive reviews. While writing about Reinhart's process of making dough, Miami Herald wrote that "if you hate kneading, this is the process for you" and Buffalo News wrote that "… baking guru Peter Reinhart has been tinkering in his bread kitchen, hammering out the most bulletproof recipes yet for people who want more from their bread. The Los Angeles Times featured the book in its “6 of the year’s best books for 2014" and wrote that "[it] moves between basic instruction and advanced technique while keeping Reinhart's down-to-earth narrative and tone."

== Awards and honors ==
- 1995 – Winner of the James Beard Foundation's National Bread Competition – Wild Yeast Country Bread
- 1999 – James Beard Award – Crust and Crumb
- 2002 – James Beard Cook Book of the Year Award – The Bread Baker's Apprentice
- 2002 – IACP Cook Book of the Year award – The Bread Baker's Apprentice
- 2002 – International Gourmand Award for Best Baking Book in the World – The Bread Baker's Apprentice
- 2008 – James Beard Award – Whole Grain Breads

== Bibliography ==
- Brother Juniper's Bread Book: Slow Rise As Method and Metaphor (1991)
- Sacramental Magic In A Small-town Cafe: Recipes And Stories From Brother Juniper's Cafe (1994)
- Bread Upon The Waters (2000)
- The Bread Baker's Apprentice: Mastering the Art of Extraordinary Bread (2001)
- American Pie: My Search for the Perfect Pizza (2003)
- Brother Juniper's Bread Book (2005)
- Crust and Crumb: Master Formulas for Serious Bread Bakers (2006)
- Peter Reinhart's Whole Grain Breads: New Techniques, Extraordinary Flavor (2007)
- Peter Reinhart's Artisan Breads Every Day (2009)
- The Joy of Gluten-Free, Sugar-Free Baking (2012)
- Bread Revolution: World-Class Baking with Sprouted & Whole Grains, Heirloom Flours & Fresh Techniques (2014)
- Perfect Pan Pizza: Detroit, Roman, Sicilian, Foccacia, and Grandma Pies to Make at Home (2019)
- Pizza Quest: My Never-Ending Search for the Perfect Pizza (2022)
