= Kidzu Children's Museum =

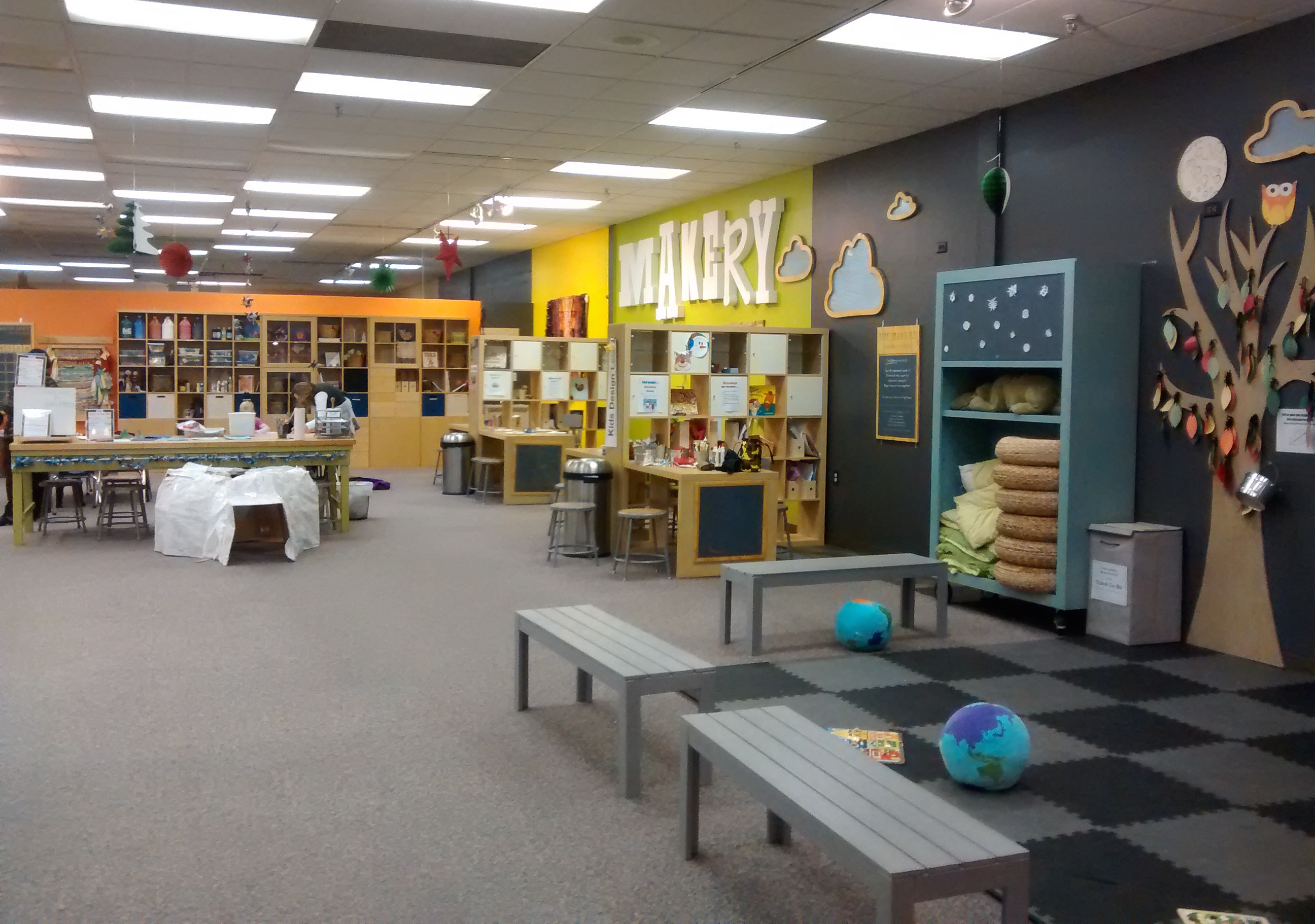
- Established: March 2006
- Location: Chapel Hill, NC
- Type: Children's museum
- Director: Lisa Van Deman
- Website: http://www.kidzuchildrensmuseum.org/

Kidzu Children's Museum is a private, 501(c)(3) non-profit children's museum serving ages infant through tween. The museum was established in 2006 in a store front on Franklin Street in Chapel Hill, North Carolina. The museum soon outgrew the location and began looking for a larger space. In November 2011, after construction delays pushed back the move to a larger space, the museum temporarily moved to University Square. Then in February 2014, Kidzu reopened in University Place in Chapel Hill. They were contracted to stay in the mall through 2017.
