= Southern Season =

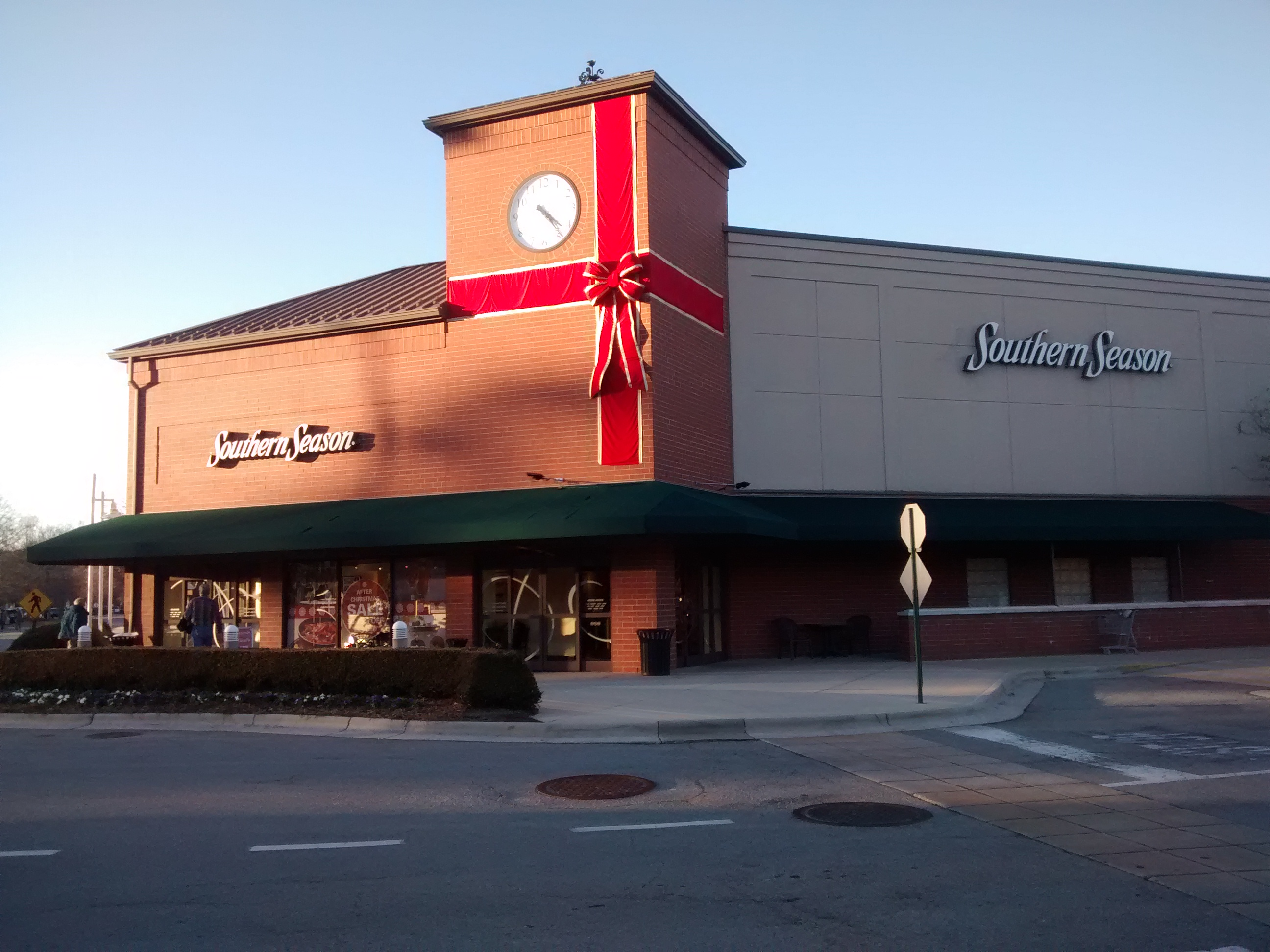
Former Chapel Hill store, decorated for Christmas

Southern Season is a gourmet mail-order store based in Graham, North Carolina.

Until its closure in January 2020 after 44 years of operation, the flagship location was an emporium store in Chapel Hill, North Carolina which contained a cooking school, restaurant, and card and flower shop. The retail store also offered free daily gourmet food tastings to walk-in customers.

== History ==
A Southern Season was created in 1975 by Michael Cooper Barefoot as a coffee roastery. In 1978, it was operating primarily as a retail store offering gourmet specialty food items in Chapel Hill. By 2003, it had moved up to a 59,000-square-foot (5,500 m^{2}) space in Chapel Hill's University Mall, making it one of the largest specialty-only gourmet markets in the United States.

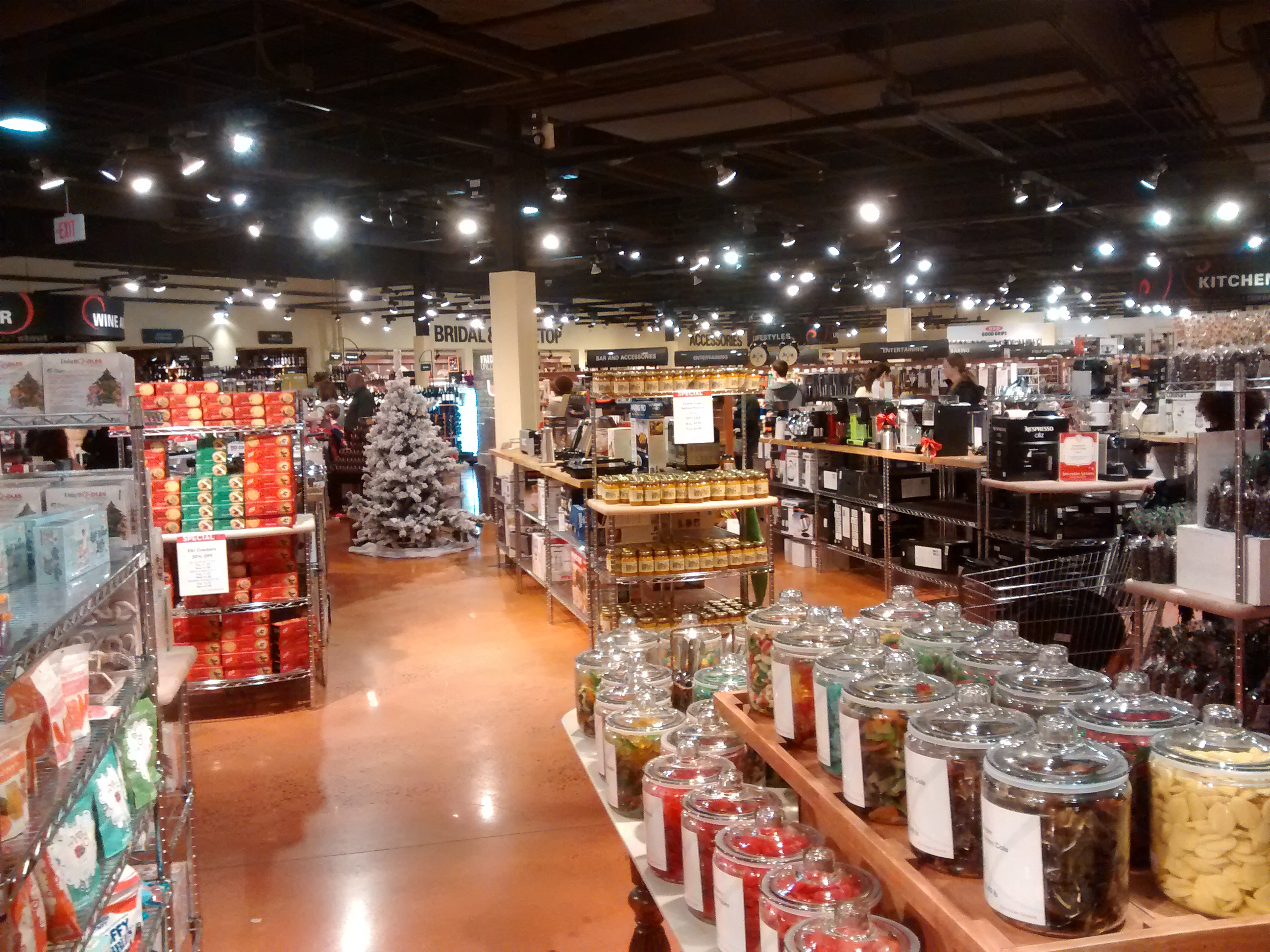
Interior of Southern Season in Chapel Hill, North Carolina

On August 2, 2011, it was announced that ownership of A Southern Season would transfer to TC Capital Fund, a joint venture between Carrboro Capital Corporation and Tryon Capital Ventures, LLC, both companies local to the Triangle region of North Carolina. At the time of purchase, the company dropped the 'A' from its title.

On December 13, 2012, Southern Season announced plans to open a Charleston-area store in the neighboring suburb of Mount Pleasant, South Carolina. This second store opened for business on September 5, 2013. The 44,000 square foot store was located at the Brookgreen Town Center on Coleman Boulevard and included one of the world's largest gourmet food markets. Like the flagship location in Chapel Hill, the Mount Pleasant store featured a selection of local and international products, a full-service restaurant, extensive wine and beer selection, a cooking school and an on-site bakery.

A third store opened on July 31, 2014, in Richmond, Virginia. The 50,000 square foot store was the first business to open in the new mixed-use Libbie Mills development on Staples Mill Road. It closed on April 24, 2016.

In June 2016, Southern Season declared bankruptcy. The former company operated under the name SSI Liquidations. On August 22, 2016, Calvert Retail - a Delaware-based retail company - acquired the Chapel Hill Southern Season store for $3.5 million. The acquisition did not include the Taste stores in Raleigh, Asheville, and Charleston.

On November 11, 2019, it was announced that the store's Weathervane restaurant had closed, and the main store would be closing early the next year. In January 2020 it was reported that the Chapel Hill store had also closed, although the online retail facility based in Graham would continue operating. In October of 2023, Southern Season opened a Warehouse Store in Graham, NC where it continues to serve customers today.

== Former offerings ==
- Southern Season retail store in Chapel Hill, North Carolina
- Weathervane, a restaurant located in the Chapel Hill store.
- The Cooking School at Southern Season - located inside the store.
