= Pierre Renart =

French designer and cabinetmaker (born 1990)

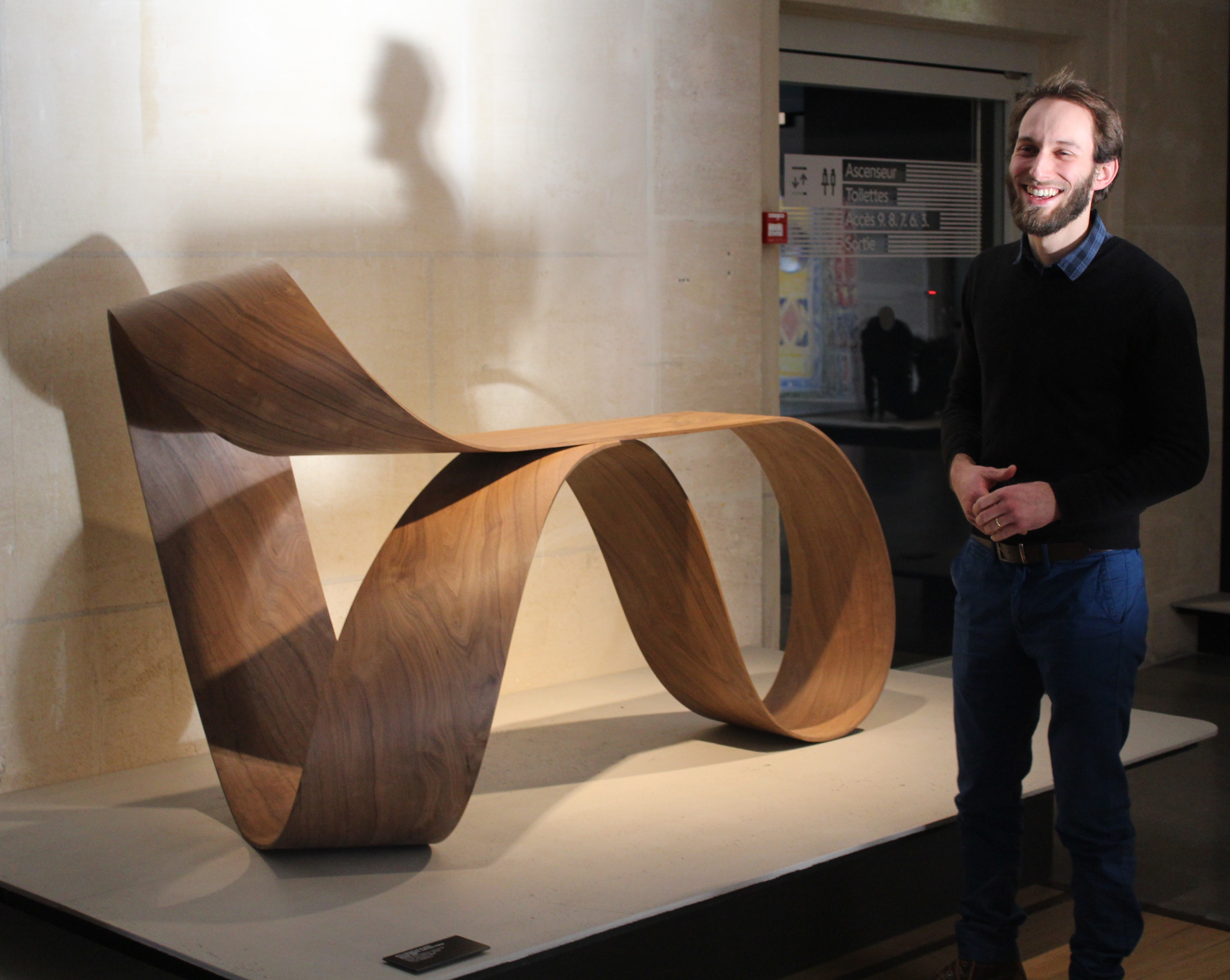
- Education: École Boulle
- Known for: Design
- Awards: 2016 Laureate of the Banque Populaire Foundation
- Website: pierrerenart.com

Pierre Renart (born 1990, in the Pyrenees region) is a French designer and cabinetmaker, who studied carpentry at the École Boulle in Paris. Among his best-known designs are the Genesis and Ribbon Collections.

== Background ==
Pierre Renart studied Seat Carpentry at the École Boulle School in Paris. In June 2011, he graduated from the school with a perfect score (20/20) and with praises from the jury, after proposing his final year project: a carbon fibre and leather chair inspired an Art Deco armchair created in 1933 by Raymond Gillet.

In 2019, Renart's furniture joined the permanent collection of the Museum of Decorative Arts in Paris.

== Career ==
Represented by the Maison Parisienne gallery in Paris since 2011, Renart has presented his work in exhibitions, private hotels and other settings in Paris, London, Brussels, Gstaad, Dubai, and New York.

In 2018, Renart started adapting his techniques to commissioned projects, creating numerous sculpted wood furniture for hotel lobbies, companies or private properties

== Public collections ==
- Museum of Decorative Arts, Paris (France)

== Collaborations ==
- 22 Bishopsgate – London, U.K. Creation of XXL furniture for the lobby.
- Christian Dior – Boston, U.S. Creation of a silver möbius console
- Studio Harcourt – Paris, France Creation of the Café Harcourt’s furniture

== Exhibitions ==
- Art Elysées - Galerie Maison Parisienne - Paris - October 2019
- Effets Matières - Plaza Athénée - Paris - May 2019
- Révélations - Biennale internationale métiers d’art & création - Grand Palais - Paris - May 2019
- La Promenade du Collectionneur 2 - Hôtel Le Meurice - Paris - April 2019
- PAD Paris - Jardin des Tuileries - Paris - April 2019
- Collect - Saatchi Gallery, Galerie Maison Parisienne - London - February 2019
- Art Elysées - Galerie Maison Parisienne - Paris - October 2018
- Brown’s Hotel - Galerie Maison Parisienne - London - October 2018
- La Promenade du Collectionneur - Hôtel Le Meurice - Paris - April 2018
- Art Paris - Grand Palais, Galerie Maison Parisienne - Paris - April 2018
- Collect - Saatchi Gallery, Galerie Maison Parisienne - London - February 2018
- What’s New? What’s New? - The New York Design Center - New York - September 2017
- Révélations - Biennale internationale métiers d’art & création - Grand Palais - Paris - February 2017
- Design Week Milan - Pisa Orologeria, Maison Parisienne/Côté France - April 2017
- Design Days DubaÏ - Maison Parisienne/Territoire(s) Dubaï - Dubaï - March 2017
- Collect - Saatchi Gallery, Galerie Maison Parisienne - London - February 2017
- Suite Harcourt- Hôtel de Paris - Monaco - December 2016
- De Mains de Maîtres - L’ARBED - Luxembourg - December 2016
- Création du mobilier Harcourt pour le café du Studio Harcourt - Paris - May 2016
- Etoiles Filantes - Maison Parisienne/Plaza Athénée - Paris - April 2016
- Oh My Cabinet! - Maison Parisienne/Maison Assouline - London - October 2015
- Une cerise dans la voiture! - Maison Parisienne - Brussels - September 2015
- L’envers du décor - Maison Parisienne/Ancienne Nonciature – Brussels - April 2015
- Alchemic Ceremony - Maison Parisienne/Ely House Mallett – London - October 2014
- Création-innovation - L’Ecole Boulle au Musée des arts et métiers - Paris - July 2014
- Éclat d’âme - Maison Parisienne/Ancienne Nonciature - Brussels - April 2014
- Galerie Menus Plaisirs - Gstaad - December 2013
- Rouge Plaza - Maison Parisienne/Studio Harcourt - Paris - December 2013
- Objets de désir - Maison Parisienne/Ancienne Nonciature – Brussels - November 2013
- Humeur Baroque - Maison Parisienne - Brussels - April 2013
- Sympathie - Kyoto - February 2013
- Rencontre - Parc floral de Paris - Paris - November 2012
- Précieuse Idylle - Maison Parisienne/Plaza Athenée - Paris - November 2012
- Rouge - Maison Particulière - Brussels - September 2012
- Chassés-croisés - Maison Parisienne/Hôtel Wielemans - Brussels - April 2012
- Hauts talents - Maison Parisienne/Salons privés Maison Christofle - Paris - March 2012
- Fêtes Galantes - Maison Parisienne/Plaza Athénée - Paris - November 2011
