= Hugo Marti =

Swiss Germanist, writer and literary editor

- Born: Hugo Marti; 23 December 1893; Basel, Switzerland
- Died: 20 April 1937 (aged 43); Davos, Switzerland
- Occupations: Germanist; Writer; Literary editor

Hugo Marti (1893–1937) was a Swiss Germanist, writer and literary editor.

== Life and work ==
Hugo Marti grew up in Basel, Liestal and Bern. Initially, he studied law, but in 1914 switched to German studies (literature and linguistics). His studies were several times interrupted by periods spent in Norway and Romania, where he supported himself by working as a home tutor. He eventually obtained his doctorate from the University of Bern in 1921 with a dissertation on the language used in the Swiss Civil Code.

His first job after this was on the iconic Pestalozzi-Kalender, a diary/agenda published annually for school children. In 1922 he was appointed to a Literary editorship with Der Bund, a daily national newspaper published in Bern. Here, many of his more satirical contributions appeared under the pseudonym "Bepp": Bepp's true identity became known only after the writer's death. As literary editor, he was supportive of younger authors such as Friedrich Glauser and Kurt Guggenheim, and acted as a counter-weight to the famously conservative "Literature Pope", Otto von Greyerz

Marti died at Davos, then well known as a health resort, in his 44th year from tuberculosis, with which he had been diagnosed in 1928. He had written about his treatment for the disease in his "Davoser Stundenbuch".

== Published output ==
- Beiträge zu einem vergleichenden Wörterbuch der deutschen Rechtssprache, auf Grund des Schweizerischen Zivilgesetzbuches. Paul Haupt, Bern 1921
- Wortregister zum Schweizerischen Zivilgesetzbuch. Haupt, Bern 1922
- Das Haus am Haff. Erzählung. Rhein-Verlag, Basel 1922
- Das Kirchlein zu den sieben Wundern Legenden. Rhein, Basel 1922
- Balder. Sieben Nächte. Rhein, Basel 1923
- Der Kelch. Gedichte. Rhein, Basel 1925
- Jahresring. Ein poetischer Roman voll Nordlandzauber. Rhein, Basel 1925
- Rumänisches Intermezzo. Buch der Erinnerung. Francke, Bern 1926
- Rumänische Mädchen. Zwei Novellen. Francke, Bern 1928
- Notizblätter von Bepp. Francke, Bern 1928 (zweite Folge 19??; dritte Folge 1942)
  - Neuausgabe v. Elsa Marti im Selbstverlag: Bern 1969
- Die Herberge am Fluss. Ein Spiel (ill. v. Fritz Pauli). Benteli, Bümpliz 1932
- Die Universität Bern. Lindner, Küssnacht am Rigi 1932
- Die Hundertjahrfeier der Universität Bern. Ein Bericht. Haupt, Bern 1934
- Davoser Stundenbuch. Francke, Bern 1935
- Rudolf von Tavel. Leben und Werk. Francke, Bern 1935; 4. A. Cosmos, Muri 1984, ISBN 3-305-00072-4
- Eine Kindheit. Francke, Bern 1936; Gute Schriften (Band 323), Bern 1968
- Der Jahrmarkt im Städtlein. Gute Schriften (Band 187), Bern/Basel 1937

=== Posthumously published ===
- Im Zeichen der Freundschaft (mit Lucian Blaga). Kriterion, Bukarest 1985
- Das Haus am Haff. Davoser Stundenbuch. Neu hg. v. Charles Linsmayer. Ex Libris, Zürich 1981
- "Die Tage sind mir wie ein Traum". Das erzählerische Werk. Hg. v. Charles Linsmayer. Huber, Frauenfeld 2004, ISBN 3-7193-1325-5
