= Benjamin Franklin Reinhart =

American painter

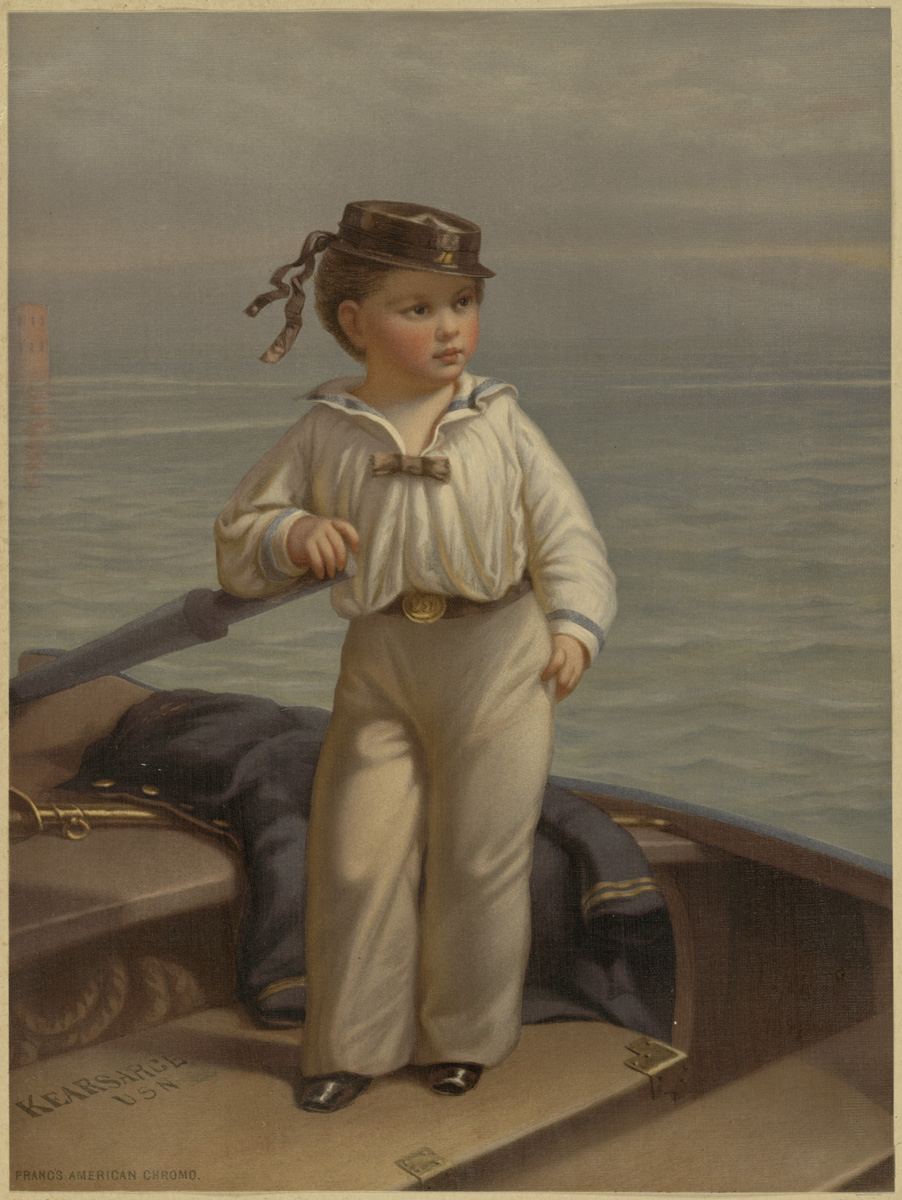
Young Commodore (on the USS Kearsarge) 1861-1897 (approximate)

Benjamin Franklin Reinhart (1829 – May 3, 1885) was an American painter born near Waynesburg, Pennsylvania, known for his genre, historical, and portrait paintings.

== Biography ==
Reinhart studied at the National Academy of Design in New York from 1847 to 1850, spending his summers in Hayesville, Ohio. He studied art abroad in Rome, Paris and Düsseldorf for three years (1850 to 1853), traveling throughout the American midwest upon his return producing historical paintings and portraits. From 1859 to 1861 he worked in New Orleans, Louisiana, and then spent his time in London, England, during the American Civil War where he became known for his genre and religious paintings. In the late 1860s he returned to the United States where he lived in Kentucky, spending the following decade living in New York City where he held several exhibits at The National Academy, of which he was an elected member since 1871. He died in Philadelphia, Pennsylvania, in 1885. Reinhart was also the uncle of artist Charles Stanley Reinhart.

== Gallery ==
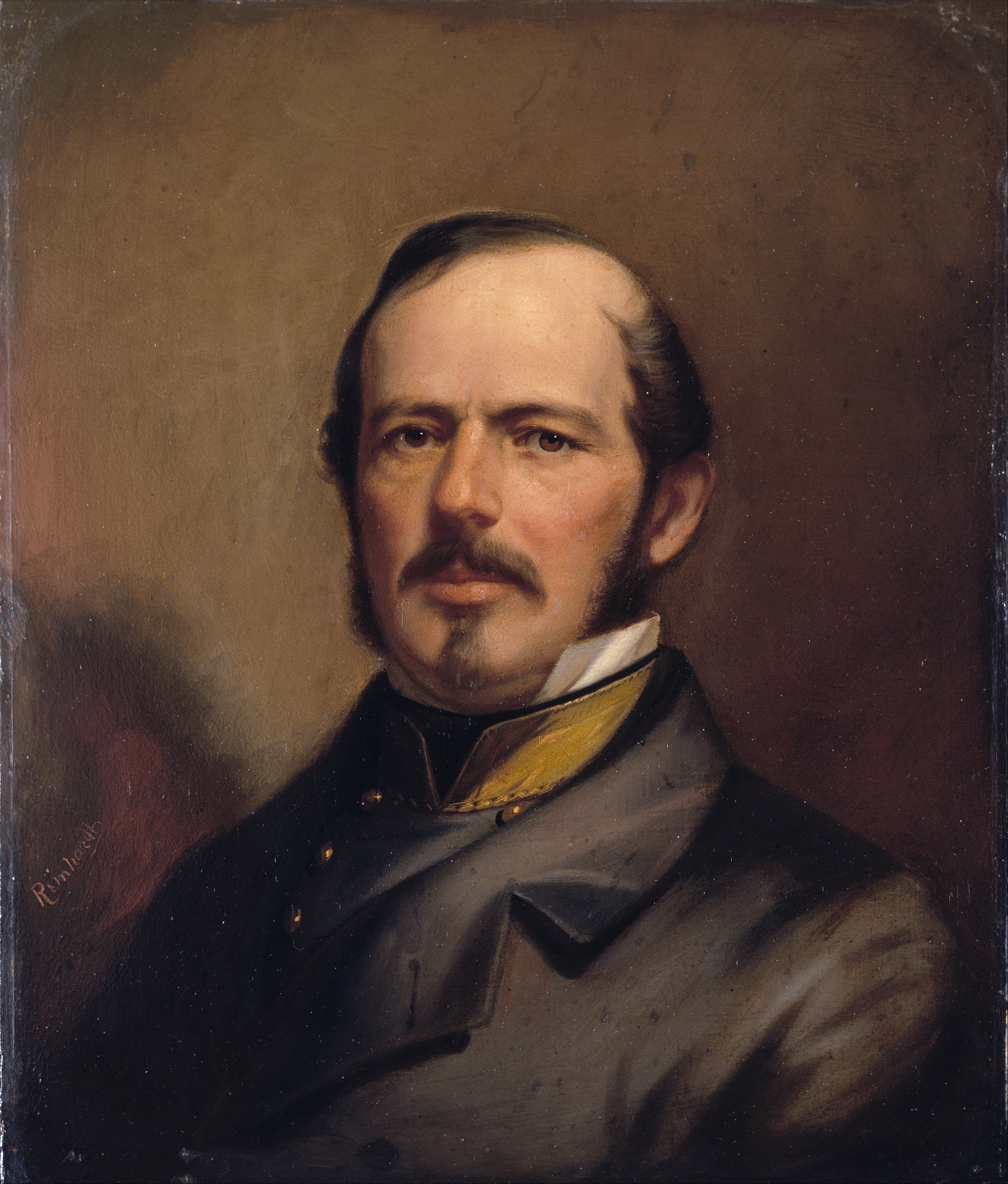
Portrait of Joseph Eggleston Johnston (c. 1860 - 1861), oil.

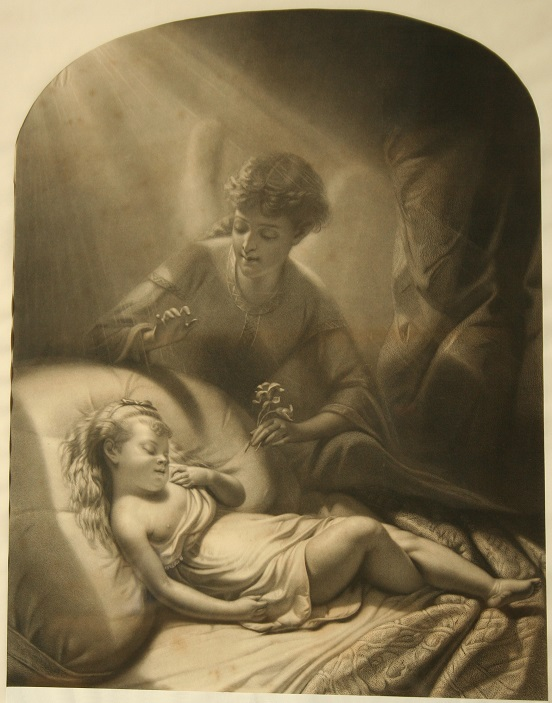
Angel Mother (1873), engraving.

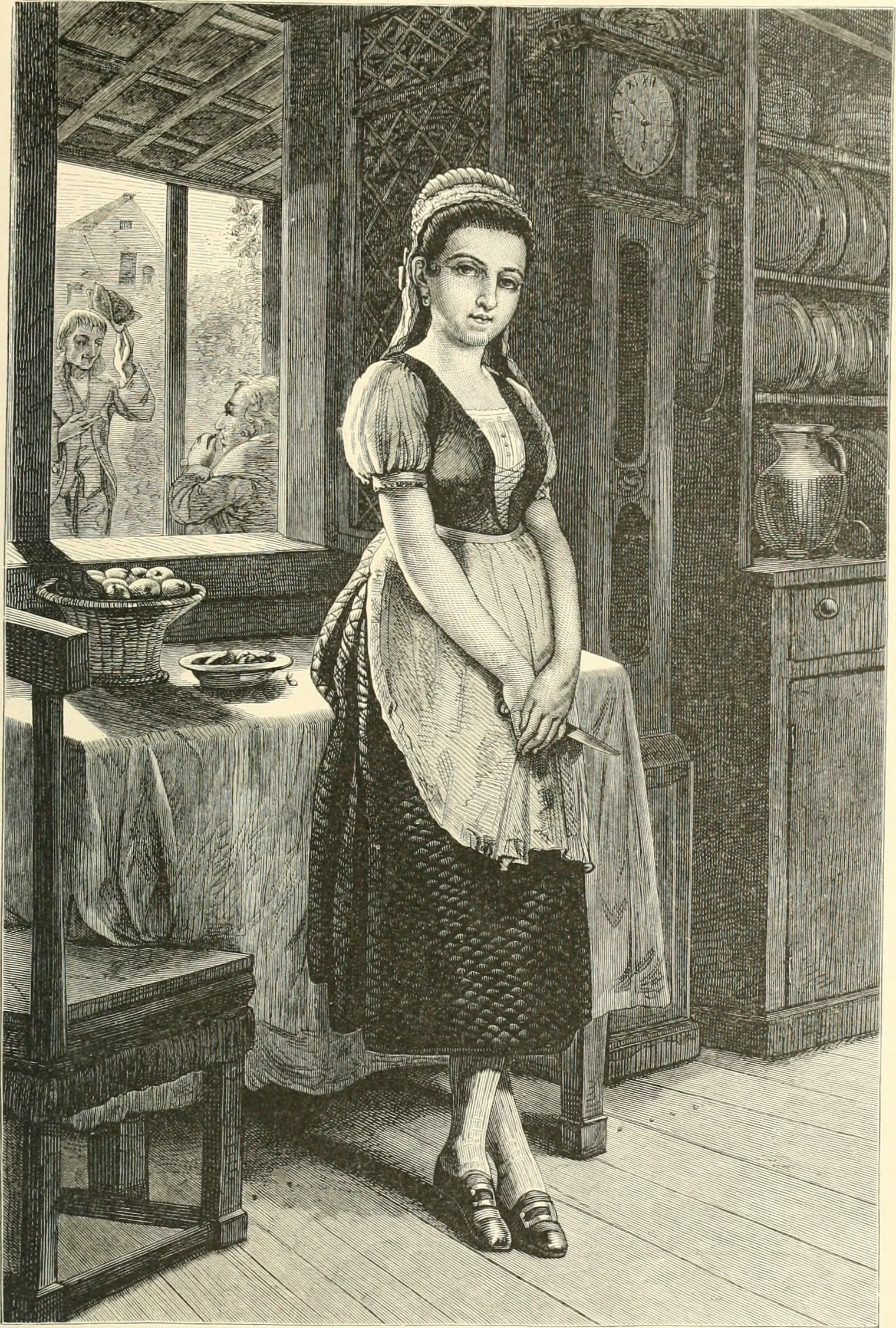
Portrait of Katrina Van Tassel (1879), wood engraving.
