= Kassandra Reinhardt =

Canadian yoga instructor and YouTube content creator

Kassandra Reinhardt is a Canadian yoga instructor, author, and content creator.

== Career ==
Her concise and accessible teaching style, including short-form sessions such as “10-minute morning yoga,” has been cited by media outlets as contributing to the growth of her audience, particularly during the COVID-19 pandemic.

Reinhardt's work has been in publications such as Yoga Journal and Triathlete Magazine, and she has authored multiple books, including Yin Yoga: Stretch the Mindful Way and Year of Yoga: Rituals for Every Day and Every Season.

Reinhardt experienced significant growth in viewership during the COVID-19 pandemic, as audiences increasingly turned to online wellness content for at-home practice.

Her online yoga instruction has been featured in lifestyle media outlets, including Elle Australia, which listed her among recommended yoga teachers on YouTube, Marie Claire UK, and Bustle.

== Personal life ==
Reinhardt resides in Ottawa, Ontario, Canada. She is a former dancer and continues to integrate creative movement and mindfulness into her practice.

== Bibliography ==
- Yin Yoga: Stretch the Mindful Way (DK Publishing, 2021)
- Year of Yoga: Rituals for Every Day and Every Season (Mandala Publishing, 2022)
