= Charles Stanley Reinhart =

American painter

Charles S. Reinhart
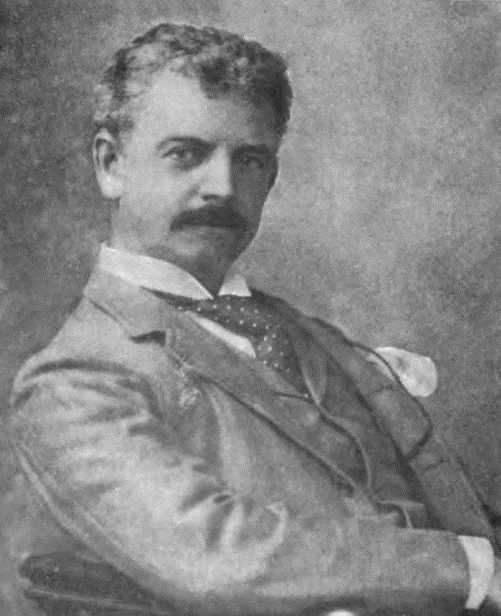
- Charles S. Reinhart
- Born: Charles Stanley Reinhart; May 16, 1844; Pittsburgh, Pennsylvania
- Died: August 30, 1896 (aged 52); New York, New York
- Resting place: Allegheny Cemetery Pittsburgh, Pennsylvania
- Known for: Illustration, painting

Charles Stanley Reinhart (May 16, 1844 – August 30, 1896), usually cited as C. S. Reinhart, was an American painter and illustrator. He was a nephew of artist Benjamin Franklin Reinhart.

== Biography ==
C.S. Reinhart was born in Pittsburgh, Pennsylvania. After having been employed in railway work and at a steel factory, he studied art at the Atelier Suisse in Paris and at the Munich Academy under Straehuber and Otto. Afterwards he settled in New York City, but spent the years 1882–86 in Paris where he exhibited regularly in the Salon. As a young artist, he along with Edwin Austin Abbey, Robert Blum, A.B. Frost and Howard Pyle, studied under Charles Parsons, who was head of the art department at Harper Brothers in the 1870s. A collection of 247 letters, eight original drawings, and two sketchbooks can be found at Columbia University's Rare Book & Manuscript Library.

A contemporary reviewer said of Reinhart:

C. S. Reinhart has become widely known as one of the most versatile illustrators we have produced. Excelling as a draughtsman, he brings to his aid an active fancy that enables him vividly to realize the scenes he undertakes to represent; and he seems equally at home in the portrayal of quaint old-time scenes, or the brilliant costumes and characters of the present day, combined with forcible delineations of scenery.

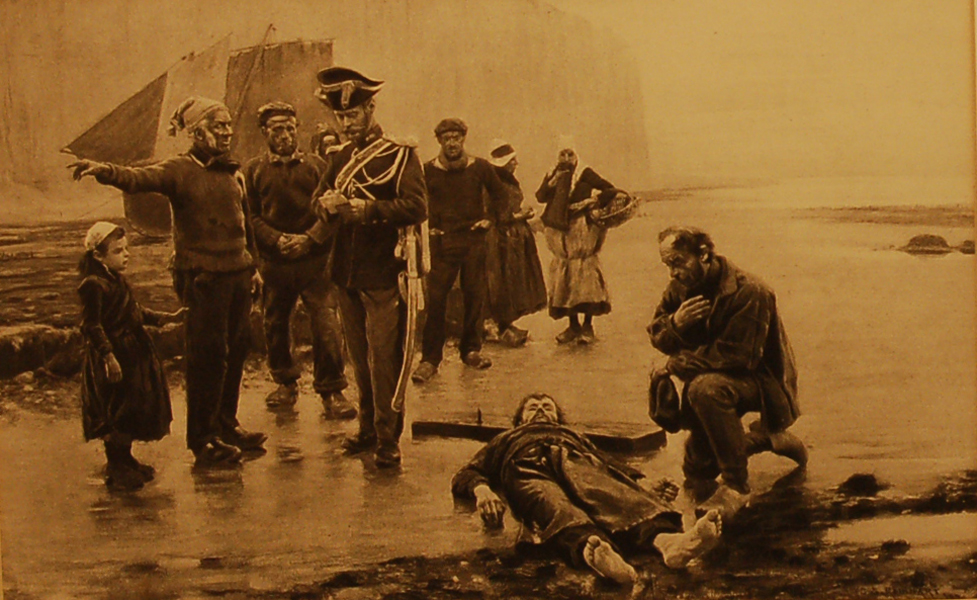
Washed Ashore (1887), engraving

A principal painting, Washed Ashore, depicts the varied reactions of observers to a drowned sailor on a beach. It earned him an Honorable Mention at the 1887 Paris Salon, and the 1888 Temple Gold Medal from the Pennsylvania Academy of the Fine Arts.

In Harper's Weekly I found an illustration by Reinhart, by far the best I've seen by him up to now, Washed Ashore. A body has been washed up, a man is kneeling beside it to see who it is, a few fishermen and women give information about the shipwreck victim to a gendarme. So it looks somewhat like Victim of a Shipwreck that you have, but the drawing by R. has something of [Félix] Régamey, for example. It's a very fine print.

— Vincent van Gogh.

Reinhart was also one of several artists selected and commissioned by the U.S. Bureau of Engraving and Printing to design the artwork for the Educational Series silver certificates produced in the late 19th century. The notes depict various allegorical motifs and are considered by some numismatists to be the most beautiful monetary designs ever produced by the United States.

== Works ==
Among his works are:

- "Reconnoitring"
- "Caught Napping"
- "September Morning"
- "Moonshiners" (Harper's Weekly, November 2, 1878)
- "At the Ferry" (watercolor, 1878)
- "The Old Life Boat" (oil, 1880)
- "Obadiah Holmes" (1881)
- "Spanish Barber" (watercolor, 1884)
- "Mussel Fisherwoman" (oil, 1886)
- "Washed Ashore" (won a gold medal at Philadelphia in 1888; oil, 1887)
- "Rising Tide" (purchased by the government at the Paris Exposition, 1889; oil, 1888)
- "Normandy Coast"
- "Gathering Wood" (watercolor, 1887)
- "Sunday"
- "English Garden"

=== Black and white series ===
- Reichstag Sketches
- A Little Swiss Sojourn
- Americans Abroad
- Works online from Library of Congress (43)
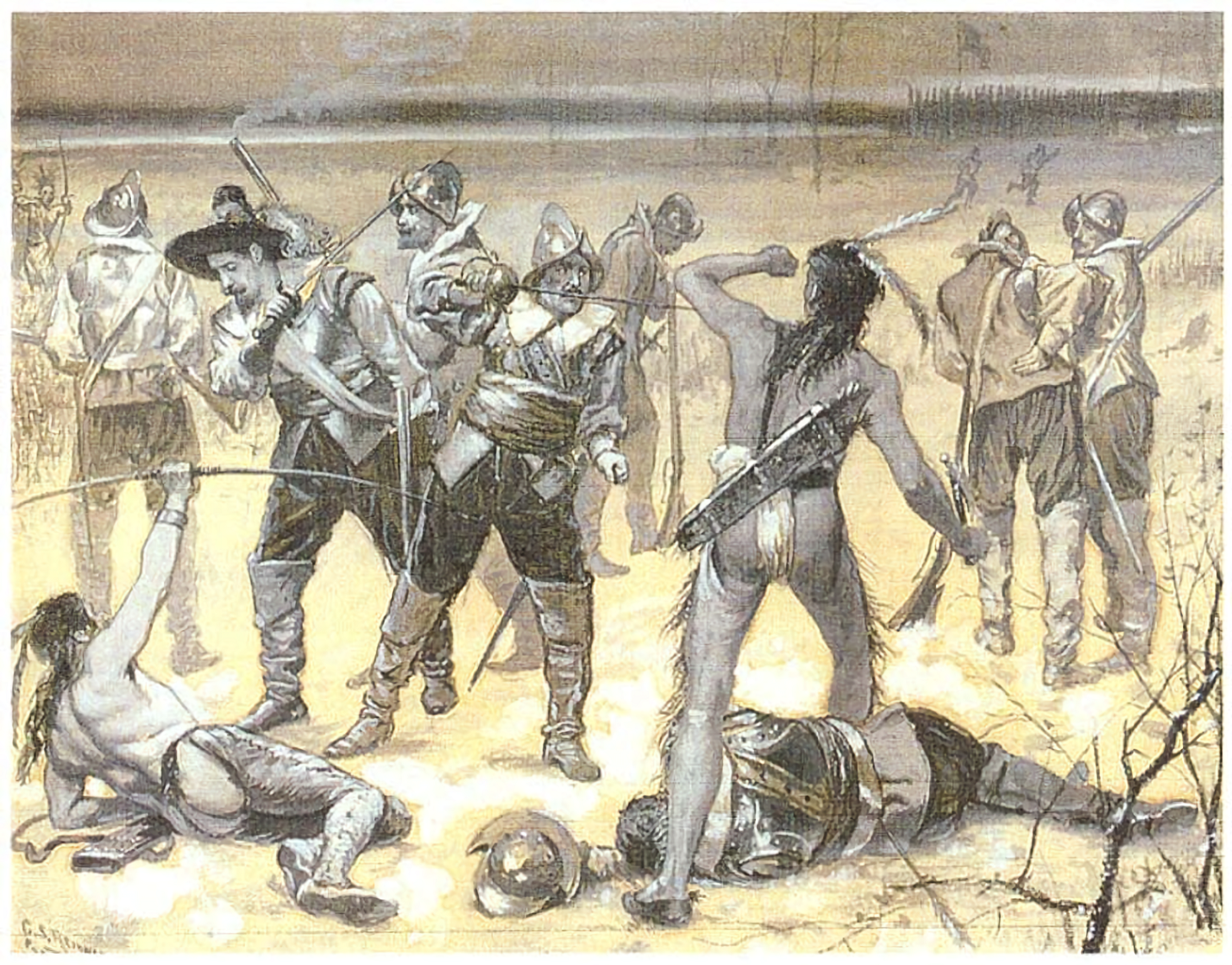
Lion Gardiner in the Pequot War from a Reinhart watercolor circa 1890

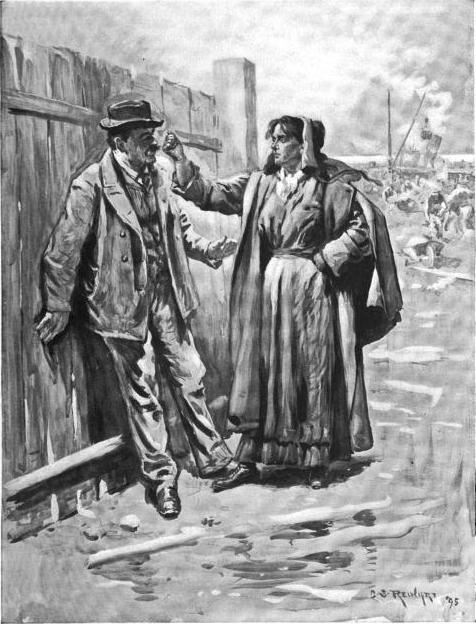
Illustration appearing in "Tom Grogan" (by author Francis Hopkinson Smith) installment in December 1895 issue of The Century Magazine.

== Literary significance and criticism ==
It has been argued that the short story The Sculptor's Funeral by Willa Cather uses Charles Stanley Reinhart as the prototype for its protagonist. Cather wrote a feature story about the first anniversary of the death of Reinhart in 1897 when she attended the erection of his monument Allegheny Cemetery in Pittsburgh.
