= Volker Weidermann =

German writer and literary critic (born 1969)

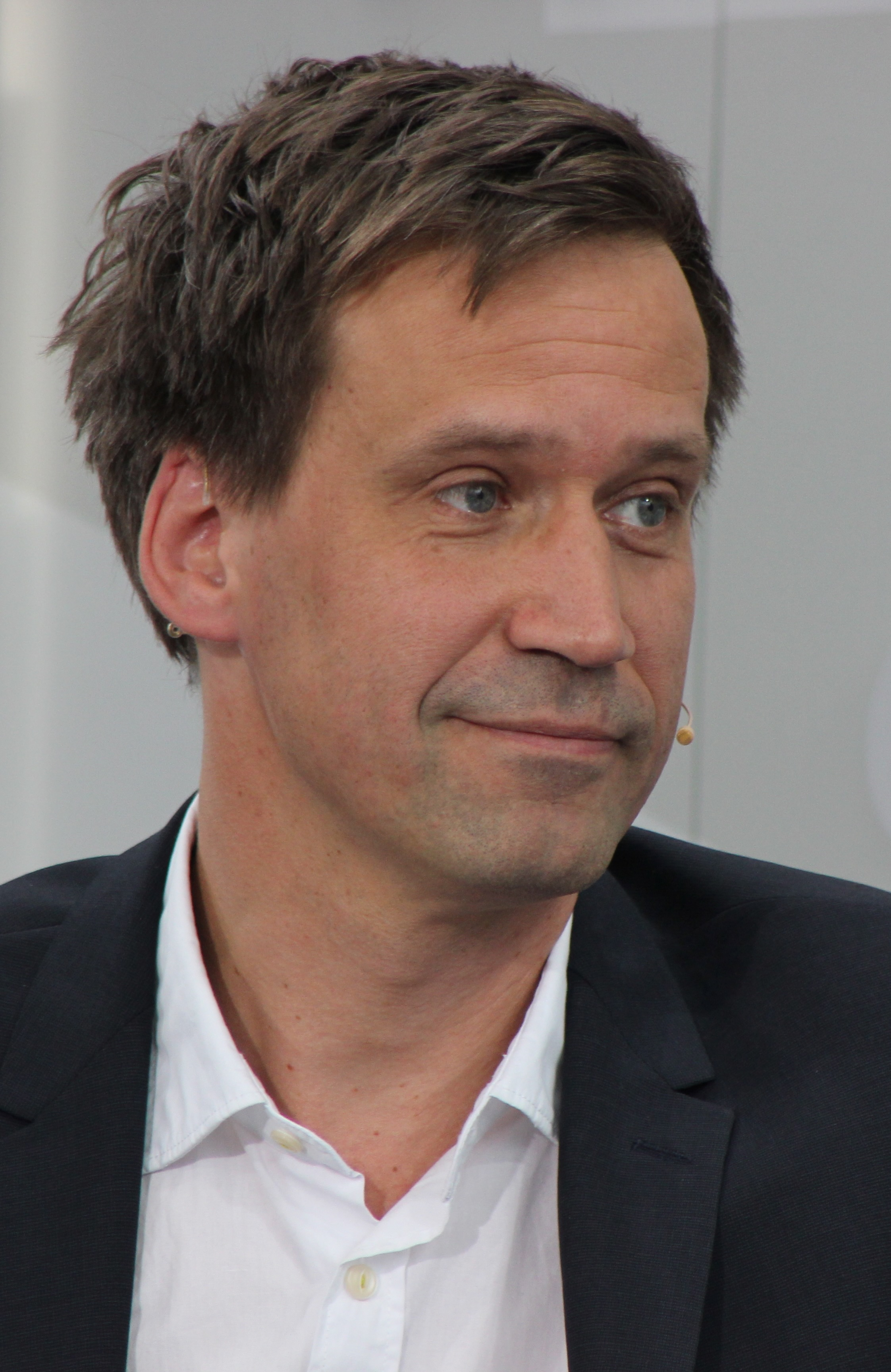
- Volker Weidermann (2014)
- Born: 6 November 1969 (age 57); Darmstadt, West Germany
- Occupations: Writer; Literary critic Literary editor

Volker Weidermann (born 1969) is a German writer and literary critic. He currently works for the Frankfurter Allgemeine Zeitung as the literary director and editor of the newspaper's Sunday edition. In 2015, he changed to Der Spiegel.

== Life ==
Weidermann studied political science along with German language and linguistics at Heidelberg and Berlin. For many years he wrote as a literary critic for the Berlin-based Tageszeitung, where he was employed as editor between 1998 and 2001. He then switched to the literary directorship of the then newly established Sunday edition of the venerable Frankfurter Allgemeine Zeitung. Since 2003 he has headed up the publication jointly with Claudius Seidl.

Weidermann is publishing the collected output of the prolific pacifist writer Armin T. Wegner; the first volume appeared in 2012. That was also the year in which Weidermann took on a guest professorship at Washington University in St. Louis, Missouri. He lives in Berlin.

== Publications ==
March 2006 saw the appearance of Weidermann's literary history, Lichtjahre (Light Years), subtitled, rather more helpfully, A Short History of German Literature from 1945 till Today. This gave rise to a discussion about the division of literary criticism in Germany into two opposing camps, characterized by Hubert Winkels of the national radio station as the "Emphatic" and the "Gnostic." The distinction drawn by Winkels, writing in Die Zeit, is between literary critics such as Weidermann, who pay close attention to the vitality, realism, and passion of an author's output, and those who concentrate on the textual form and style along with the language and the dramaturgy. One camp hankers after "true life," while the other looks out for "true literature." Predictably, having defined the polar opposites in this way, Winkels is critical of both.

Weidermann marked the 100th anniversary of the birth of Max Frisch with a critical new biography, published in 2010, entitled Max Frisch. Sein Leben, seine Bücher (Max Frisch: His Life and His Books).

Volker Weidermann: Principal Publications
- Lichtjahre: Eine kurze Geschichte der deutschen Literatur von 1945 bis heute. Kieperheuer & Witsch, Köln 2006, ISBN 3-462-03693-9.
  - Als Taschenbuch: btb, München 2007, ISBN 978-3-442-73642-3.
  - Als Hörbuch: Hörverlag, München 2006, ISBN 3-89940-964-7.
- Das Buch der verbrannten Bücher. Kiepenheuer & Witsch, Köln 2008, ISBN 978-3-462-03962-7.
- Max Frisch. Sein Leben, seine Bücher. Kiepenheuer & Witsch, Köln 2010, ISBN 978-3-462-04227-6.
- Ostende: 1936, Sommer der Freundschaft. Kiepenheuer & Witsch, Köln 2014, ISBN 978-3-462-04600-7.
- Dreamers: When the Writers Took Power, Germany 1918. Pushkin Press, 2018.

In 2008, Buch der verbrannten Bücher (Book of the Burned Books) appeared, comprising 131 miniature overviews of the lives and works of authors whose works were included in the 1933 Book Burnings. In 2009 this book won Weidermann the Kurt-Tucholsky-Preis for literary journalism. The biographical novel Ostende: 1936, Sommer der Freundschaft (Ostend 1936: Summer of Friendship)) appeared in 2014. It concerns the friendship of two very different writers, Stefan Zweig and Joseph Roth, and their meeting at the Belgian coastal resort Ostend in 1936. Weidermann addressed the same subject in a nonfiction book that has been translated into English. Other exiled German writers and artists were at Ostend at the same time, including Roth's latest love, Irmgard Keun, along with Hermann Kesten, Egon Erwin Kisch, Arthur Koestler, Willi Münzenberg, Ernst Toller, and Toller's young wife, Christiane Grautoff.
