= Rinehart, West Virginia =

Unincorporated community in West Virginia, US

Coordinates: 39°25′26″N 80°30′59″W

Rinehart is an unincorporated community in Harrison County, in the U.S. state of West Virginia.

== History ==
A post office called Rinehart was established in 1901, and remained in operation until 1953. The community was named after Hollis Rinehart, the builder of a nearby railroad tunnel.
