= Michel Renard =

Martiniquais politician

Deputy of the National Assembly
- In office 16 March 1986 – 14 May 1988

Mayor of Le Marigot

Personal details
- Born: 24 September 1924 Le Marigot
- Died: 17 December 2015 (aged 91) Fort-de-France
- Party: Rally for the Republic

Michel Renard (born 24 September 1924 – 17 December 2015) was a politician from Martinique who served in the French National Assembly from 1986 to 1988.
