= Johann Georg Reinhardt =

Austrian composer

Johann Georg Reinhardt (c. 1676 – 6 January 1742) was an Austrian composer. (His name is sometimes spelt Rheinhardt, Reinhard, or Reinharth.)

Appointed imperial court organist on 1 January 1708, he later became later Kapellmeister of St. Stephen's Cathedral, Vienna. One of his students was Giuseppe Bonno. He composed ballets, serenatas, one opera and some church music.

== Stage works ==
- La più bella (libretto: Pietro Pariati), componimento da cantarsi per musica (1715, Vienna)
- L'eroe immortale (libretto: Pietro Pariati), servizio da camera (1717, Vienna)
- Il giudizio di Enone (libretto: Pietro Pariati), festa teatrale per musica (1721, Vienna)
