= Sally Regenhard =

American activist (born 1946)

- Born: Catherine Theresa Doherty; November 4, 1946 (age 80); New York City, U.S.
- Occupation: activist
- Spouse: Al Regenhard (m. 1967)
- Children: son Christian (deceased) daughter Christina

Sally Regenhard (born November 4, 1946) is an American activist who has become one of the leading voices for the families of the victims of the September 11 attacks. A former long-time resident of Co-op City in The Bronx in New York City who has degrees in behavioral sciences and gerontology and has worked in the nursing home industry for over 20 years, Regenhard became an advocate for skyscraper safety after the death of her 28-year-old son, Christian, a probationary firefighter with the New York City Fire Department, who perished in the collapse of the World Trade Center on September 11, 2001.

== Activism ==
Along with her husband Al, her daughter Christina, and Monica Gabrielle, a widow who lost her husband Richard as a result of the collapse of the towers, they founded the Skyscraper Safety Campaign, a national non-profit organization that has four main goals:

- Demand a federal investigation (via the use of subpoenas) into the collapse of the World Trade Center, including information on its design, evacuation procedures, and "firefighting techniques".
- To promote improved compliance of building and fire codes in New York City and nationwide, and assuring the safety of firefighters and residents (and workers) who reside and work in such structures.
- To educate "codes groups" in allowing fire departments in having a say in the building of new skyscrapers. The "code groups" will be assembled by a mixed group of fire services officials and engineers, replacing the present "code groups" who are composed mainly of bureaucrats, builders, and others who have little or no knowledge of fire safety.
- To have say and voice in the construction of the Freedom Tower and all other structures built at Ground Zero, thus assuring that newly revised fire safety codes are enforced.

Regenhard has also worked to honor her son's legacy. On July 18, 2006, Sally and her family, with the assistance of then-Senator Hillary Clinton, dedicated the Christian Regenhard Center for Emergency Response Studies at John Jay College of Criminal Justice located in Manhattan. Currently it is a research center offering seminars, lectures, and doing research and contracts with emergency response organizations. The College dedicated its own 9/11 Memorial in 2011.

The credits page of Robert Greenwald's viral videos series, The REAL RUDY, offer "very special thanks to Regenhard.

== Views about Rudolph Giuliani ==
In recent years, Regenhard has become one of the most vocal and visible critics of Rudolph Giuliani, who was Mayor of New York City at the time of the attacks. Giuliani gained wider popularity for his handling of the crisis. With plenty of media coverage and high public approval ratings, he became a major candidate in the Republican nomination for the 2008 presidential race.

Regenhard made national headlines in May 2004, when during a televised public hearing on the 9/11 Commission, she interrupted Giuliani while he was giving a speech. She has made appearances on various news-related programs on such networks as CNN and C-SPAN.

In a September 2006 article in New York Daily News, Regenhard said, "There's a large and growing number of both FDNY families, FDNY members, former and current, and civilian families who want to expose the true failures of the Giuliani administration when it comes to 9/11," and that she intends to "Swift Boat" Giuliani and his campaign.

== Post 9/11 ==
Regenhard has voiced her opposition to the construction of the controversial Park51 project that will be located in a building near Ground Zero. The proposed Park51 (named after the building's street address of 51 Park Place) project, which will include both a mosque and an Islamic cultural center, has been the target of many opponents who claim that it may attract Islamic extremists and who consider it an insult to the victims of the September 11 terrorist attacks. Regenhard, who was interviewed by The New York Times claims that the construction of the center would be "sacrilege on sacred ground." In response to accusations that opponents to the project were anti-Muslim, Regenhard replied "People are being accused of being anti-Muslim and racist, but this is simply a matter of sensitivity. It’s hard enough to go down to that pit of hell and death."

Regenhard resides in Yonkers, New York, with her husband.

== See also ==
- 9/11 Family Steering Committee
- Health effects arising from the September 11, 2001 attacks
