= Witham to Maldon branch line =

Former railway line in Essex, England

Witham to Maldon Railway
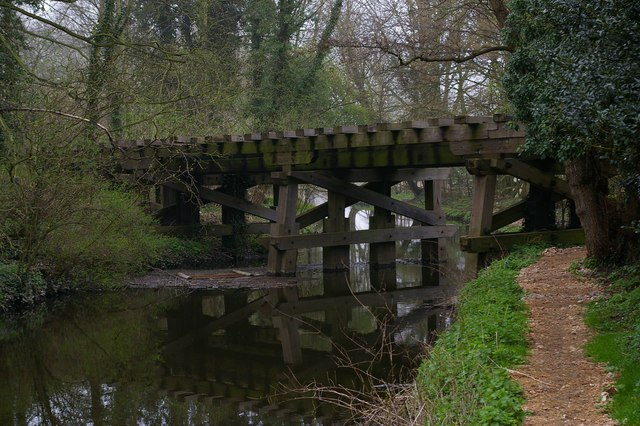
- Wooden viaduct over the river Blackwater

Overview
- Status: Closed
- Owner: Eastern Counties Railway, Great Eastern Railway, Eastern Region of British Railways
- Locale: Essex
- Termini: Witham, Maldon East and Heybridge
- Stations: 4

Service
- Type: Heavy rail

History
- Opened: 1848
- Closed: 1964

Technical
- Line length: 5.75 mi (9.3 km)
- Number of tracks: Two initially; reduced to one in 1850
- Track gauge: 4 ft 8 1/2 in (1,435 mm) standard gauge
- Electrification: No

The Witham to Maldon branch line was a railway line joining Maldon to the British railway network at Witham, in Essex, England. It was opened in 1848 and closed in 1964; it was 5 3/4 miles (9 km) long.

== First proposals ==
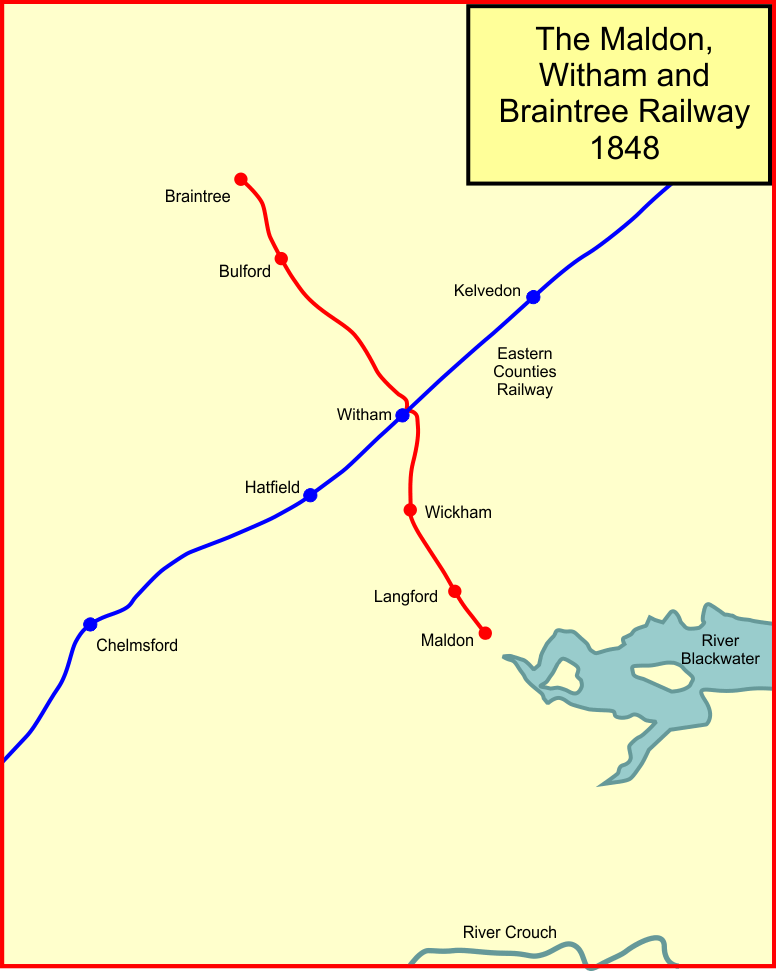
The railway lines around Maldon in 1848

In 1825, the Stockton and Darlington Railway opened and many communities were prompted to consider whether a railway was a means to increased prosperity locally. A meeting at Maldon in that year considered the matter, but it was considered that the time was not right.

After the opening of the London Liverpool Street to Colchester line by the Eastern Counties Railway (ECR) in 1843, local interests in Maldon proposed a branch line connecting Maldon to Braintree, crossing the ECR's main line at Witham. It was predicted that £200,000 would be enough for the construction; it was important to get goods to and from the town cheaply. The share allotment was heavily oversubscribed, mostly by London interests, with very little interest from Braintree.

== Maldon and Braintree authorised ==
Maldon, Witham and Braintree Railway Act 1846
- Act of Parliament
- Parliament of the United Kingdom
- Long title: An Act for making a Railway from Maldon, through Witham, to Braintree, all in the County of Essex.
- Citation: 9 & 10 Vict. c. lii

Dates
- Royal assent: 18 June 1846

Plans were formulated and deposited in 1845 and, in the 1846 parliamentary session, the bill for the Maldon, Witham and Braintree Railway was passed, gaining royal assent as the Maldon, Witham and Braintree Railway Act 1846 (9 & 10 Vict. c. lii) on 18 June; share capital was £200,000.

The act authorised construction of a double track railway from Maldon to Braintree by way of Heybridge, Langford, Wickham Bishops, Witham Faulkbourne, White Notley and Bulford.

Eastern Counties Railway (Maldon, Witham, and Braintree) Act 1847
- Act of Parliament
- Parliament of the United Kingdom
- Long title: An Act to authorise the Purchase by the Eastern Counties Railway Company of the Maldon, Witham, and Braintree Railway.
- Citation: 10 & 11 Vict. c. xcii

Dates
- Royal assent: 2 July 1847
Other legislation
| Repealed by | Great Eastern Railway Act 1862 |

Status: Repealed

Text of statute as originally enacted

The ECR had agreed the use of Witham station by MW&BR trains. The Eastern Counties Railways, controlled by George Hudson, saw the strategic advantage of the branches and, on 10 September 1846, the ECR offered to purchase the unconstructed railway for £6,300 with a bonus of 10 shillings per share. The MW&BR board considered this offer on 18 September 1846 and determined to accept it. The ECR takeover proceeded and was authorised by the Eastern Counties Railway (Maldon, Witham, and Braintree) Act 1847 (10 & 11 Vict. c. xcii) of 2 July 1847.

In March 1847, a contract for construction of the railway was awarded to Thomas Jackson of Pimlico. The ECR allowed planned improvements to the river Blackwater at Maldon, originally intended to sustain the declining harbour against competition from elsewhere, to be dropped. The authorised line was to cross the ECR main line a little to the east of Witham, but the ECR saw the impracticality of that, as it did not facilitate connection with the main line trains. Accordingly, the ECR altered the proposed route to make it two branch lines joining into Witham station by west-facing connections. The construction was designed as cheaply as possible, using timber for many underbridges and with lightly engineered station accommodation. An exception was the station building at Maldon, which was built in an unnecessarily extravagant style. David Waddington was seeking re-election to the Maldon parliamentary constituency and was chairman of the company. It was suggested that he appears to have enhanced the specification of the building in order to encourage employment locally, but a more prosaic reason was that of appealing to civic pride among the middle classes.

== Opening ==
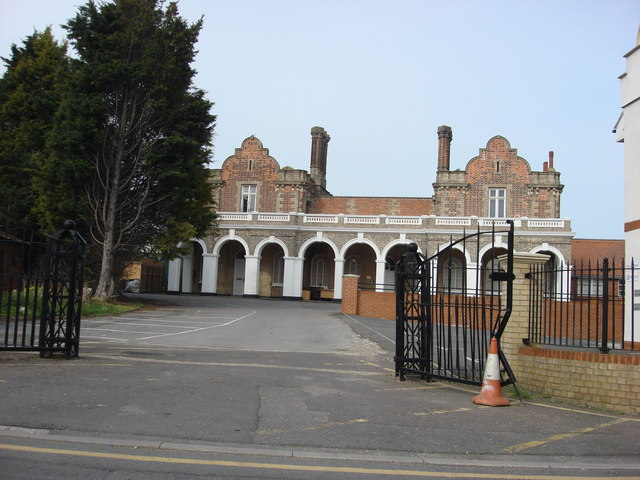
The former Maldon East railway station

The construction was slow due to exceptionally bad weather, but progress was made and a goods train ran from Maldon to Braintree on 15 August 1848; this usage continued in order to consolidate the track. Captain George Wynne for the Board of Trade inspected the line on 29 (Paye) or 30 (Swindale) September 1848 and approved it for the running of passenger trains. Accordingly, passenger operation started on 2 October 1848. Five trains a day ran; the journey time was 20 minutes from Maldon to Witham and 40 minutes throughout from Maldon to Braintree.

The line had been built as double track in anticipation of heavy usage, but this did not materialise; traffic on the line was disappointing. In 1850, one track was removed and the material was used on relaying of track on the Colchester main line.

In 1862, the Great Eastern Railway was formed by amalgamation of several companies, including the ECR; the coat of arms of the borough of Maldon was included in the crest of the new GER.

== Maldon East to Woodham Ferris ==
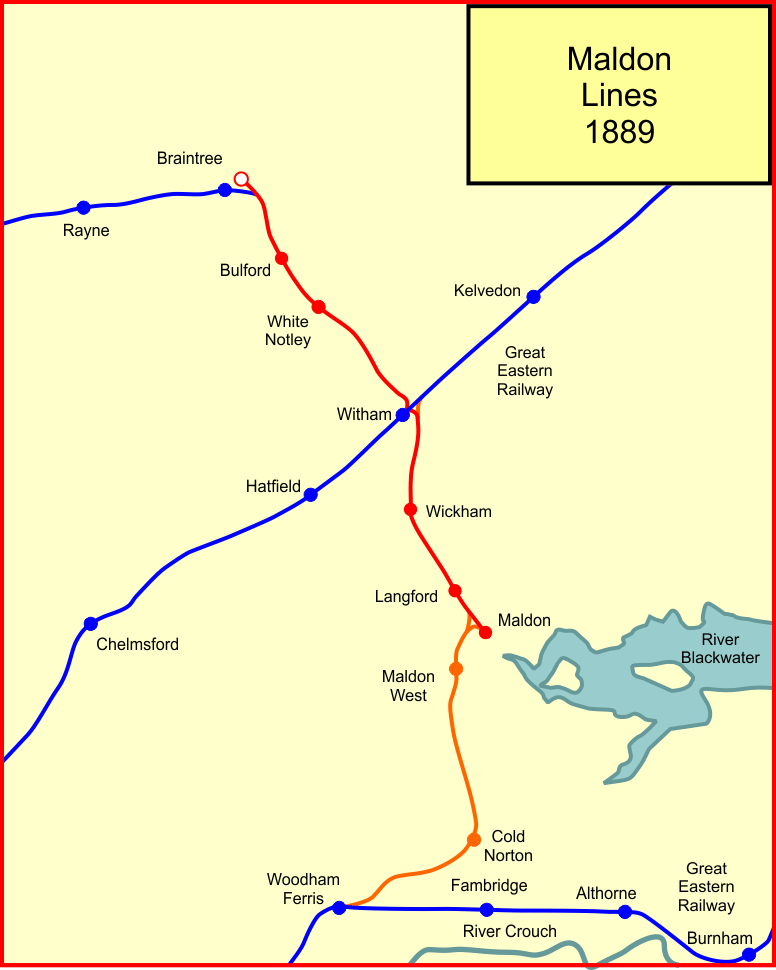
The Maldon lines in 1889

On 16 July 1883, the Great Eastern Railway (General Powers) Act 1883 (46 & 47 Vict. c. cvii) gave authorisation for the New Essex Lines project. This included a new line from Shenfield to Southend, which opened on 1 October 1889. A branch from that line, from Wickford Junction to Southminster, preceded it and was opened on 1 June 1889. There was a station on that line called Woodham Ferris, later renamed Woodham Ferrers from 1 October 1913. A branch from Woodham Ferris to Maldon was opened, as part of the New Essex Lines project, to goods on 19 November 1888 and to passengers on 1 October 1889. There were stations at Cold Norton and Maldon West. Maldon station was renamed Maldon East on 1 October 1889.

The Woodham Ferris to Maldon line was intended to form a through passenger route between Colchester North and Southend Victoria; triangular junctions were made at Wickford, Maldon and Witham to enable this routing. Part of the rationale of the New Essex Lines scheme was the encouragement of direct passenger traffic between Colchester and Southend; however, when the Southend line was completed, one Saturday-only train each way was put on from March 1890, calling at Maldon West. (Note: In February 1890, the train left Southend at 10:33am, calling at all stations to Maldon West, arriving at Colchester at 12:06pm. Stations between Maldon and Colchester are not shown in the available timetable fragment. The return journey left Colchester at 4:25pm and called at all stations from Maldon West to Southend, arriving at 6:05pm.) Usage of that was disappointing and, on 1 March 1895, the service was withdrawn and the spurs were closed.

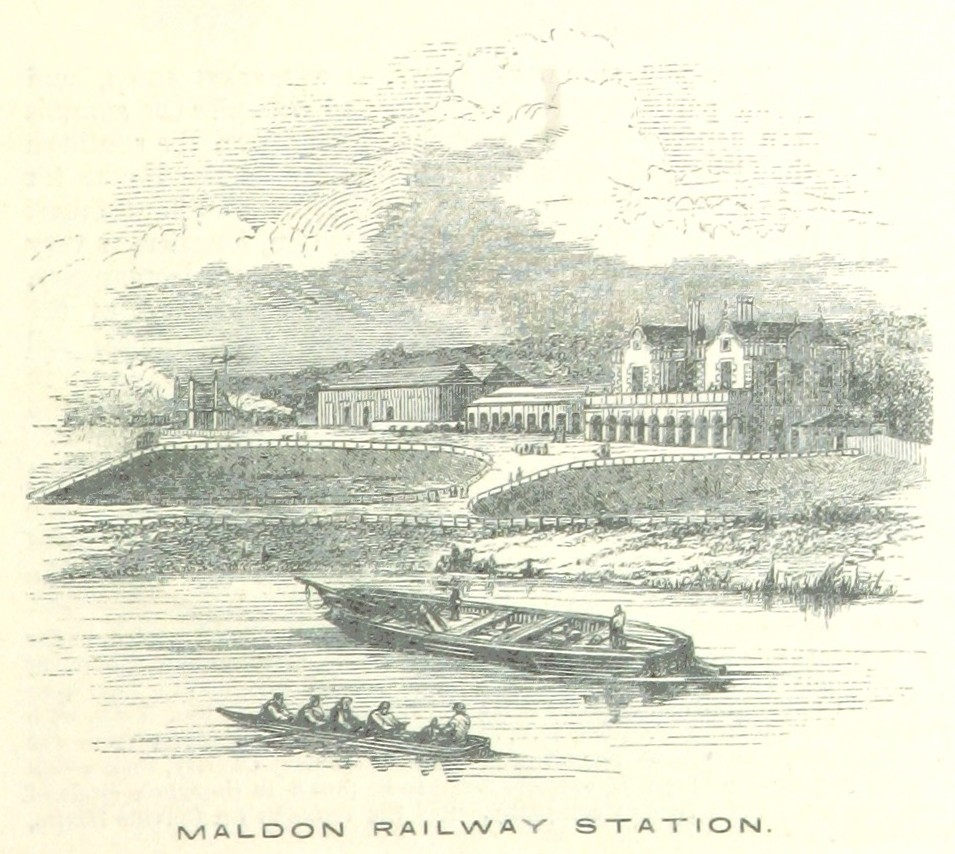
Maldon station in 1851

Indeed, the whole of the passenger operation on the Maldon to Woodham Ferrers section was poor. In an attempt to control costs, Conductor-Guard operation was brought into use from 2 October 1922. The Maldon curve was singled in 1924, (Note: The section from Maldon East Junction to Maldon West; it had been left as double track when the Maldon spur was closed.) Woodham Ferrers to Maldon was made a single signalling section by 1933. The losses were nevertheless unsustainable and the final passenger service ran from Woodham Ferrers to Maldon on 10 September 1939.

During World War II, a bomb fell on the main line near Ingatestone and the crater made the line there temporarily impassable. For two weeks, main line passenger trains ran via Woodham Ferrers and Maldon, reversing there. It was therefore said that the busiest passenger carryings on that part of the line were after closure to local passenger trains.

Nevertheless, the regular traffic on the line between Maldon West and Woodham Ferrers was only a basic goods service and the poor financial results caused the line to be completely closed on 1 April 1953.

After closure of the Maldon West to Woodham Ferrers line, the goods yard, on the first part of that line, remained in use. It was closed on 1 September 1954 and all goods traffic was handled at the original Maldon (East) goods yard. However, that site was rather cramped and it proved impossible to handle the traffic there; Maldon West goods yard was reopened on 31 January 1957; the service was ended on 31 January 1959.

== Railbuses ==
Diesel multiple units commenced operations on the lines from 14 June 1956. The light passenger carryings on this line, and the Braintree branch, encouraged consideration of low cost train operation. Waggon- und Maschinenbau GmbH Donauwörth railbuses operating on lightly-trafficked lines in the Federal Republic of Germany were considered to be successful; some vehicles were acquired and introduced on the lines from 7 July 1958.

== Closure ==
Nevertheless the financial losses of the passenger operation on the Maldon branch were considered to be unacceptable, and the line was closed to passenger services on 7 September 1964. A goods service continued until 18 April 1966, after which the line was closed completely. The Witham to Braintree section of the original Maldon, Witham and Braintree Railway continues in use as the Braintree branch line.

After 1966, a stub of the branch line at Witham was used to serve an industrial site for delivery of steel by railway; this section was finally closed in the early 1980s.

== Topography ==
Details of the stations and main junctions on the route are:

=== Witham to Maldon ===
- Witham: on the main line; opened 29 March 1843
- Wickham: opened 2 October 1848; renamed Wickham Bishops in 1913; closed 7 September 1964
- Langford: opened 2 October 1848; renamed Langford & Ulting in 1923; closed 7 September 1964
- Langford Junction: divergence of curve towards Woodham Ferris
- Maldon East Junction: convergence of Woodham Ferris line
- Maldon: opened 2 October 1848; renamed Maldon East in 1889; renamed Maldon East and Heybridge in 1907; closed 7 September 1964.

=== Woodham Ferris to Maldon ===
- Woodham Ferris: opened 1 July 1889; renamed Woodham Ferrers 1 October 1913; renamed South Woodham Ferrers 20 May 2007; still open
- Stow St Mary Halt: (Note: The village was Stow Maries. According to Mitchell, the halt was named differently at the insistence of the vicar.) opened 24 September 1928; closed 11 September 1939;
- Barons Lane Halt: opened 10 July 1922; closed 11 September 1939
- Cold Norton: opened 1 October 1889; closed 11 September 1939
- Maldon West; opened 1 October 1889; closed 22 May 1916; reopened 1 August 1919; closed 11 September 1939
- Maldon West Junction: divergence of curve to Langford Junction
- Maldon East Junction: (Note: Details in the above subsection.)
- Maldon East & Heybridge: (Note: Details in the above subsection.)

== Infrastructure ==
There were six timber trestle viaducts on the line; one near the former Wickham Bishops station (Note: Location: 51.775°N 0.6426°E.) is extant and is now a scheduled monument

The Engineer's Line Reference is WIM.

== The line today ==
The section of trackbed linking the two former railway stations in Maldon has been used as the route of the Maldon bypass to the west of the town. The Blackwater Rail Trail is a shared-use path that follows much of the trackbed of the line, with a small gap at Wickham Bishops.

In January 2019, the Campaign for Better Transport released a report identifying the line between Witham and Maldon was listed as Priority 2 for reopening, which is for those lines which require further development or a change in circumstances, such as housing developments.

In March 2020, a bid was made to the Restoring Your Railway fund to get funds for a feasibility study into reinstating the line between Witham and Maldon; this was unsuccessful. In March 2021, the bid was resubmitted as part of the third round of the funding process.
