= Fairstead, Essex =

Village in Essex, England

Coordinates: 51.823434°N 0.565517°E

Fairstead
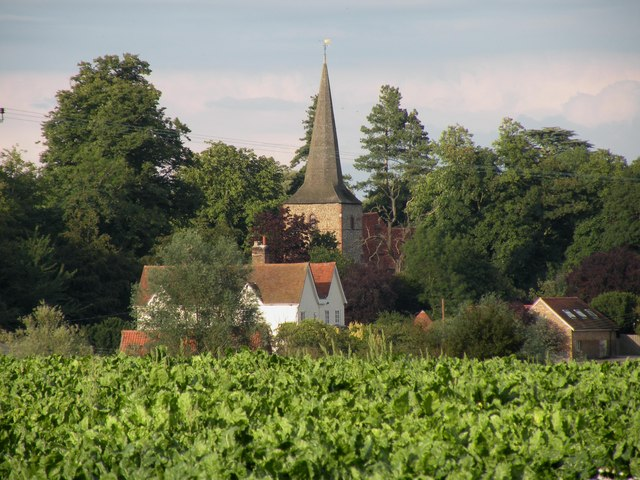
- Hall Farm and Fairstead Church

- Location within Essex
- Population: 203 (Parish, 2021)
- Civil parish: Fairstead
- District: Braintree
- Shire county: Essex
- Region: East
- Country: England
- Sovereign state: United Kingdom
- Post town: Chelmsford
- Postcode district: CM3
- Dialling code: 01245
- Police: Essex
- Fire: Essex
- Ambulance: East of England
- UK Parliament: Witham

Fairstead is a village and civil parish in the Braintree district of Essex, England. Whilst isolated in a community of farming hamlets, the parish of Fairstead has close connections with Great Leighs and is 9.8 miles (15.8 km) from Chelmsford, Essex's county town. The parish includes the hamlets of Fuller Street and Rank's Green. At the 2021 census the parish had a population of 203.

In the 1870s, Fairstead was described as being:

"a parish in Witham district, Essex; 2¼ miles SW of White Notley r. station and 4 WNW of Witham."

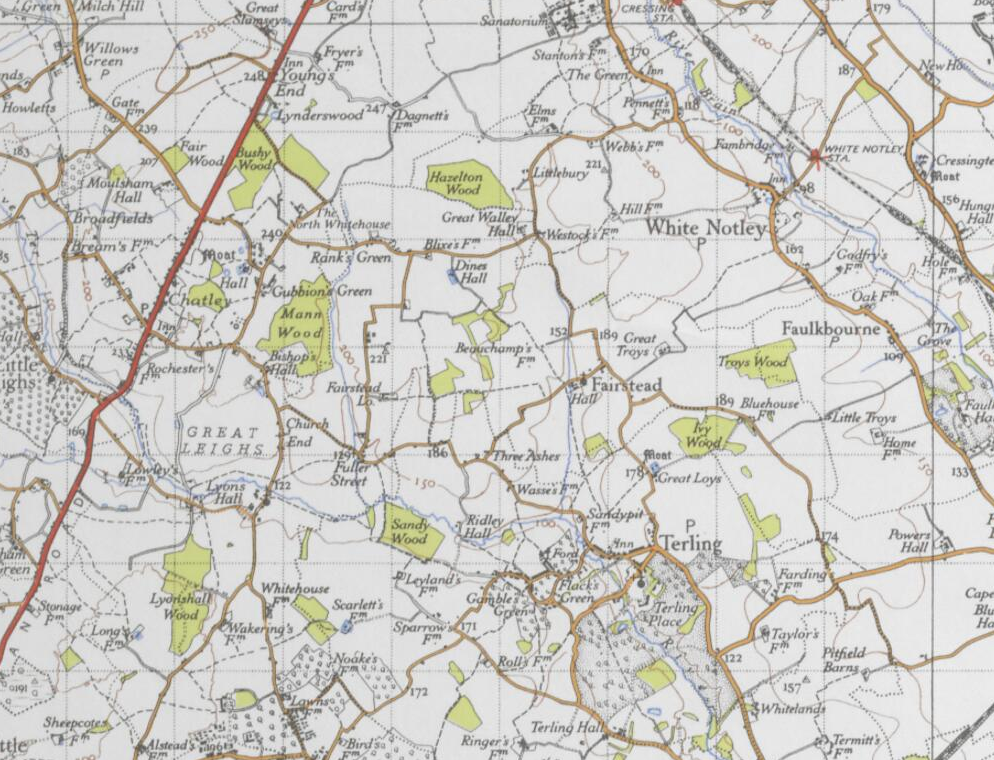
Map of Fairstead, Essex and its neighbouring towns, taken from 1945 Ordnance Survey of Great Britain

== Meaning of name ==
The name 'Fairstead' originates from Old English, meaning 'fair place'. Fair (fæger) meaning fair, beautiful or pleasant. Stead (stede) meaning 'A place, a site, a locality; a religious house or foundation; a place of communal activity; a farm, a dairy-farm, an estate.' Fair probably means a travelling fair. Thus 'fairstrad' is the place where a fair was held.

== Population ==
In the Domesday Book of 1086, Fairstead had a total population of "17 households".

The population of Fairstead has increased by 90 since the introduction of the census in 1801. Other than a peak increase of 150 in 1831, which increased the population to 350, this levelled off to 250 over the next few decades; long-term, the population of Fairstead hasn't therefore risen or fallen significantly.

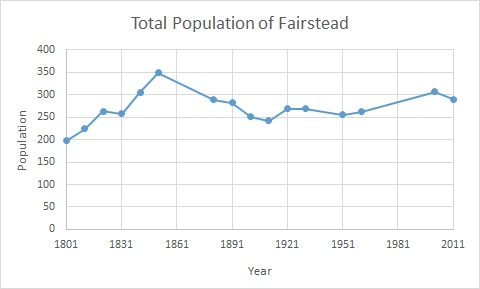
Total Population of Fairstead Civil Parish, Essex as reported by the Census of Population from 1801–2011.

In 1881, Fairstead's population was predominately male, with men outnumbering women 82:64. The majority of males listed their occupation as working in agriculture, with 66 of the males working as farmers or a similar occupation. 48 of the 66 women in Fairstead were listed as "unknown occupation"; this possibly indicates that they worked at home or were housewives.

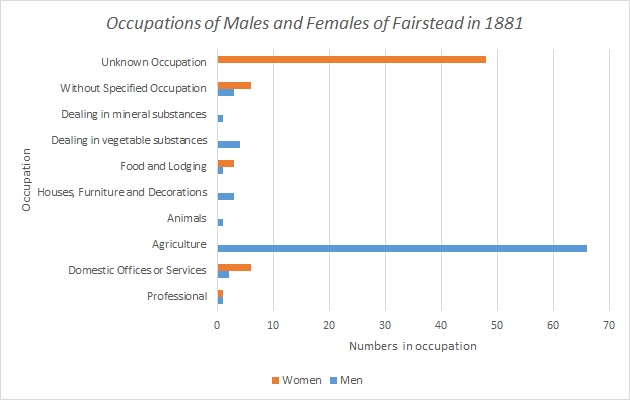
The occupations of both males and females in Fairstead, Essex in 1881, as reported by the 1881 Census of England and Wales

At the 2011 Census, there were 133 households in Fairstead, accommodating 290 people: 158 males 132 females. Of these 290 people, 156 were in work, the majority of the workers, 33 (21.2%), were in senior positions, such as managers and directors. Unlike in previous decades, few people are employed in the agriculture industry; only 10 people (6.4%) are employed in this industry.

== Education ==
In 1818, the education in Fairstead consisted of "a day school, supported at the expense of the rector, containing 20 children. The poor have ample means of educating children." Education had developed by 1833, with Fairstead having: "One Day and Sunday School, supported by the Rector, in which 22 males and 18 females attend daily, and 12 males and 4 females in addition on Sundays." By 1867, attendance and facilities had increased: "There is both a day and night school in Fairstead, not in connexion with Government, held in a large room in a cottage, attended by from 40 to 50 children. The night school is taught by the rector, with the aid of the school-mistress."

Nowadays, the nearest primary and secondary schools are located in: Great Leighs, Terling and White Notley. A lack of higher and further education is indicated as 23% of over 16s have no formal qualifications; whereas 13.5% of 16 year-olds have 5 or more GCSEs (A*-C).

== Present ==
The nearest towns are Witham, approximately 4 mi (6.4 km) to the south-east, and Braintree, approximately 5 mi (8 km) to the north.

Railway services are available from nearby White Notley and Cressing stations, on the Braintree Branch Line. Trains to London take between 45 minutes and an hour, terminating at Liverpool Street station.

There are no sport clubs in Fairstead. The nearest are in: Braintree, Witham and Chelmsford; most notable are Braintree Town F.C who play football in the Conference league and Chelmsford City F.C who play football in the Conference South.

The Square and Compasses pub dates back to 1652; it was originally two farming cottages.

Fairstead sits on the Essex Way, a popular 81-mile waymarked long-distance footpath.
