= WNY =

WNY can refer to:

- Washington Navy Yard
- Western New York
- West New York, New Jersey
- White Notley railway station, Braintree, Essex, National Rail station code WNY
