= Wickham Bishops railway station =

Former railway station in Essex, England

Wickham Bishops

General information
- Location: Wickham Bishops, Maldon, England
- Coordinates: 51.7732°N 0.6431°E
- Grid reference: TL824116
- Platforms: 1

Other information
- Status: Disused

History
- Original company: Maldon, Witham & Braintree Railway; Eastern Counties Railway
- Pre-grouping: Great Eastern Railway
- Post-grouping: London and North Eastern Railway

Key dates
- 2 October 1848: Opened as Wickham
- 1 October 1913: Renamed Wickham Bishops
- 7 September 1964: Closed
Location

Wickham Bishops railway station served the village of Wickham Bishops, in Essex, England, between 1848 and 1964. The station was sited 2 miles 39 chains (4.0 km) down the line from Witham on the Witham–Maldon branch line to Maldon East and Heybridge.

== History ==
The Maldon, Witham & Braintree Railway (MWBR) consisted of two branch lines from the Eastern Counties Railway station at Witham. The lines were opened for goods traffic on 15 August 1848. Passenger services began on 2 October that year, and the station was opened that day.

It was originally named Wickham and was renamed Wickham Bishops on 1 October 1913.

The station was closed, along with the rest of the line, on 7 September 1964.

Preceding station	Disused railways	Following station
Witham; Line closed, station open	Great Eastern Railway; Witham–Maldon branch line	Langford and Ulting; Line and station closed

== The site today ==
The main station building is now a private house; the platform also survives.
