= Cressing railway station =

Railway station in Essex, England

Cressing
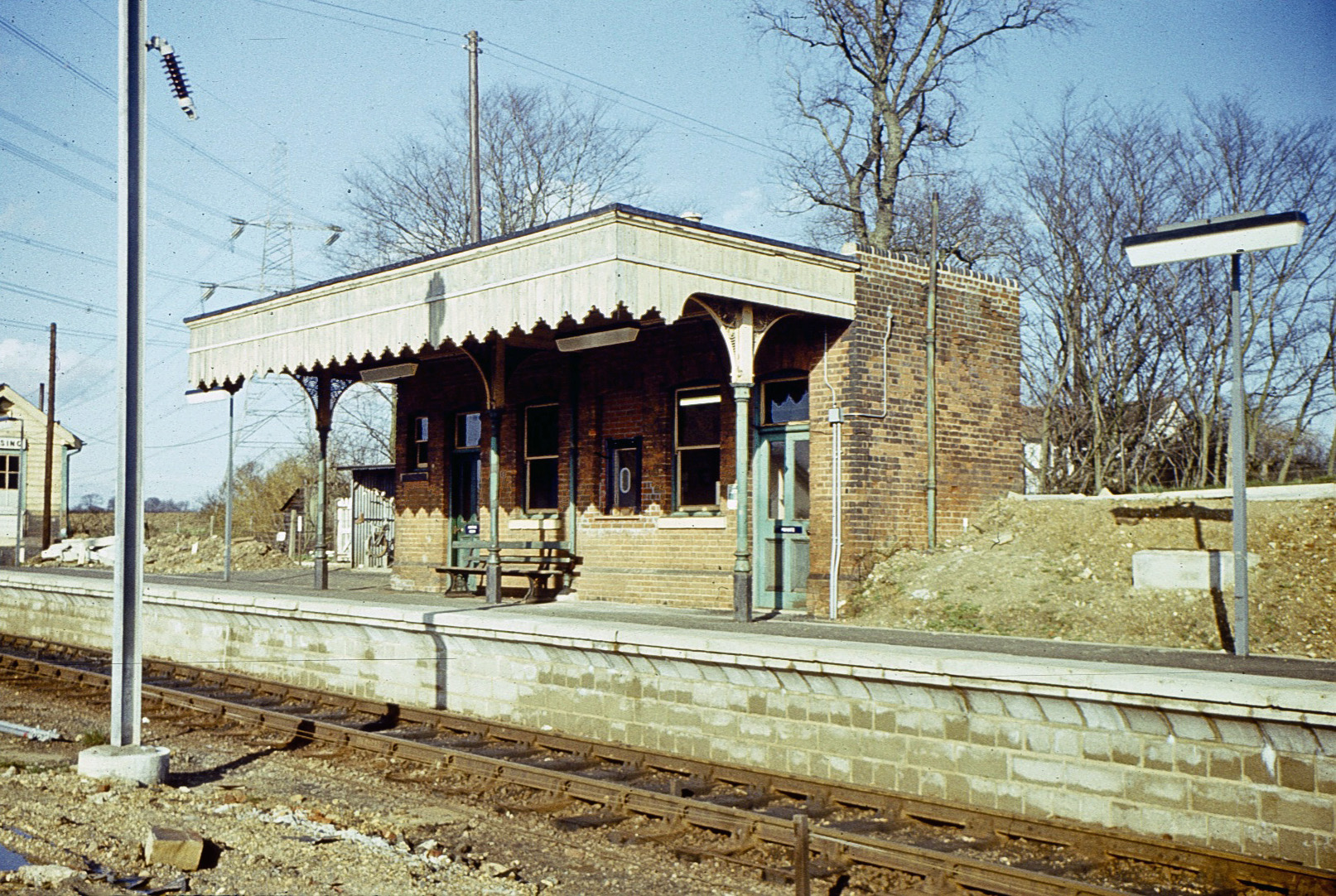
- Cressing railway station in 1976

General information
- Location: Cressing, Braintree; England
- Coordinates: 51.852°N 0.578°E
- Grid reference: TL776202
- Manager: Greater Anglia
- Platforms: 1

Other information
- Station code: CES
- Classification: DfT category F2

History
- Original company: Eastern Counties Railway
- Pre-grouping: Great Eastern Railway
- Post-grouping: London and North Eastern Railway

Key dates
- 2 October 1848: Opened as Bulford
- 1 February 1911: Renamed Cressing

Passengers
- 2021/22: ▲34,374
- 2022/23: ▲39,294
- 2023/24: ▲45,284
- 2024/25: ▲51,142
- 2025/26: ▲59,052
Location
Notes
- Passenger statistics from the Office of Rail and Road

Cressing railway station is on the Braintree Branch Line in the East of England, serving the villages of Cressing and Black Notley, Essex. It is 42 miles 75 chains (69.10 km) down the line from London Liverpool Street via Witham and it is situated between White Notley to the south and Braintree Freeport to the north. Its three-letter station code is CES. The platform has an operational length for nine-coach trains.

The station is currently managed by Greater Anglia, which also operates all trains serving it.

== History ==
The Maldon, Witham & Braintree Railway (MWBR) was authorised in 1846 but prior to its opening the company was absorbed by the Eastern Counties Railway (ECR). The line opened for goods traffic on 15 August 1848, and for passenger services on 2 October 1848; it was double-tracked throughout until the Crimean War.

The station, originally named Bulford, was also opened on 2 October 1848. It was renamed Cressing on 1 February 1911. It is suggested that the large crossing gates were present because Cressing had a passing loop until after World War I, and retained the loop for freight purposes until goods traffic ceased on the line in 1964.

The station was owned by the Great Eastern Railway (GER) from 1862 to 1923, but as the building does not show typical GER architectural canopy support features, it is likely that it pre-dates the GER. Although there does not appear to be any obvious evidence (as in the case of Maldon East & Heybridge which displays "MWB" on the gulleys at the top of its downpipes) that it was built when the line first opened, that is a possibility and if so would make it the only surviving MWBR structure on this railway.

There was originally a signal box on the platform, next to the level crossing. This was removed and relocated to the preserved Colne Valley Railway at Castle Hedingham in the 1970s.

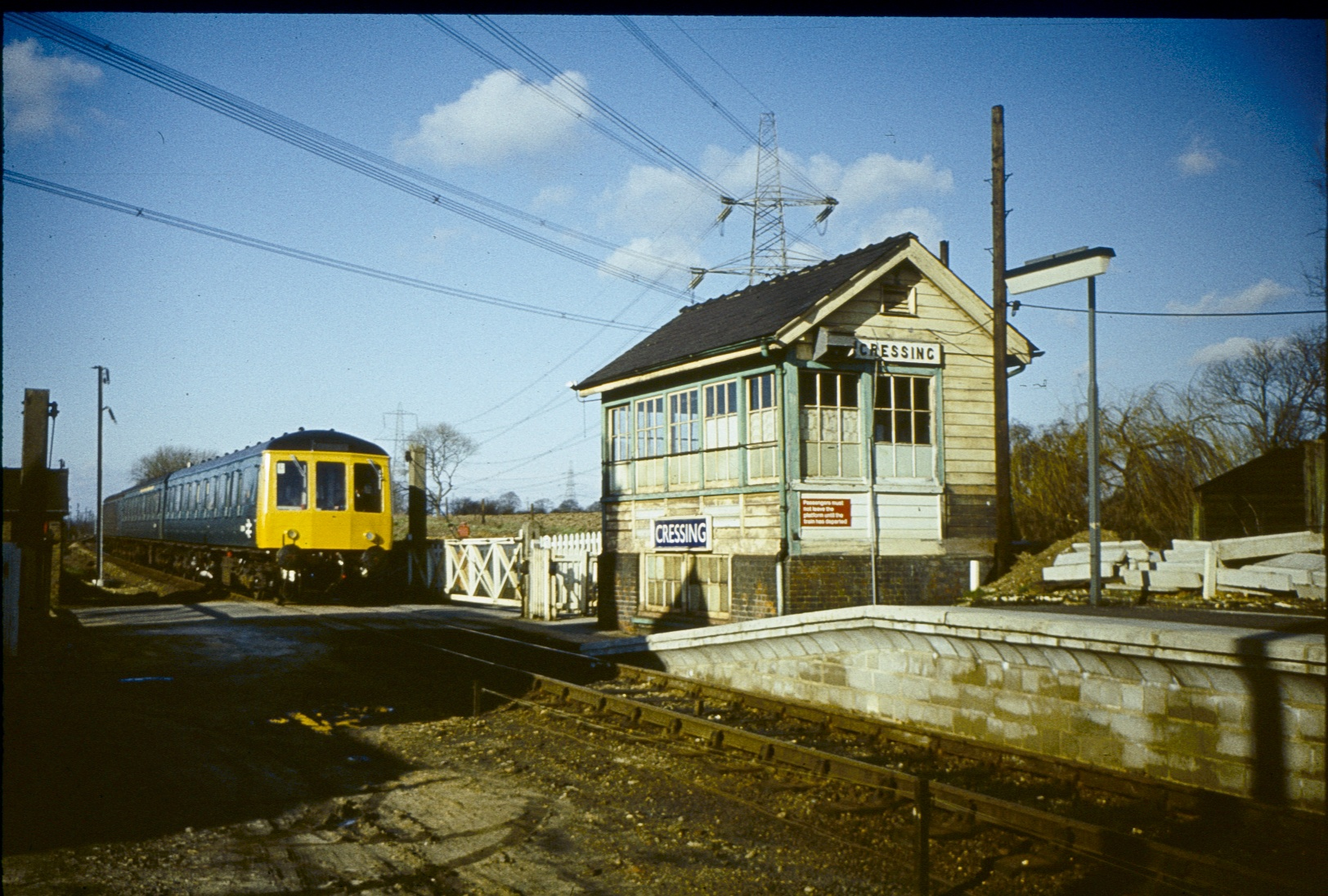
Cressing signal box in 1976, before electrification

== Services ==
All services at Cressing are operated by Greater Anglia using Class 720 EMUs.

The typical off-peak service is one train per hour in each direction between Braintree and London Liverpool Street via Witham with additional services calling at the station during the peak hours.

On Sundays, southbound services at the station run only as far as Witham.

| Preceding station | National Rail | Following station |
|---|---|---|
| White Notley | Greater Anglia Braintree Branch Line | Braintree Freeport |
