= Langford, Essex =

Village in Essex, England

Coordinates: 51.74934°N 0.66126°E

Langford
- Location within Essex
- Population: 207 (Parish, 2021)
- OS grid reference: TL838089
- District: Maldon
- Shire county: Essex
- Region: East
- Country: England
- Sovereign state: United Kingdom
- Post town: Maldon
- Postcode district: CM9
- Dialling code: 01621
- Police: Essex
- Fire: Essex
- Ambulance: East of England
- UK Parliament: Witham

Langford is a village and civil parish at the west end of the Dengie peninsula close to Maldon in the English county of Essex. It is part of the Wickham Bishops and Woodham ward of the Maldon district. At the 2021 census the parish had a population of 207. Langford shares a grouped parish council with the neighbouring parish of Ulting.

Its name is derived from the "long ford", referring to the crossing of the River Blackwater that the village grew up around.

== History ==
The place-name 'Langford' is first attested in the Domesday Book of 1086, where it appears as Langheforda. The name means 'long ford'.

Langford was a possession of Beeleigh Abbey until 6 June 1536 when during the Dissolution of the Monasteries, King Henry VIII removed the property from the abbey's ownership. The Langford and Ulting railway station on the Witham-Maldon branch line was open from 1848 until 1964 when it was closed as part of the Beeching closures.

== Religious sites ==
The local parish church is St. Giles. The exact age of the church is not known, but it is generally considered to be of Norman construction. The church was restored in 1881.

== Governance ==
There are three tiers of local government covering Langford, at parish, district, and county level: Langford and Ulting Parish Council, Maldon District Council, and Essex County Council. The parish council is a grouped parish council, also covering the neighbouring parish of Ulting. It meets at the Langford and Ulting Village Hall in Langford.

== Landmarks ==
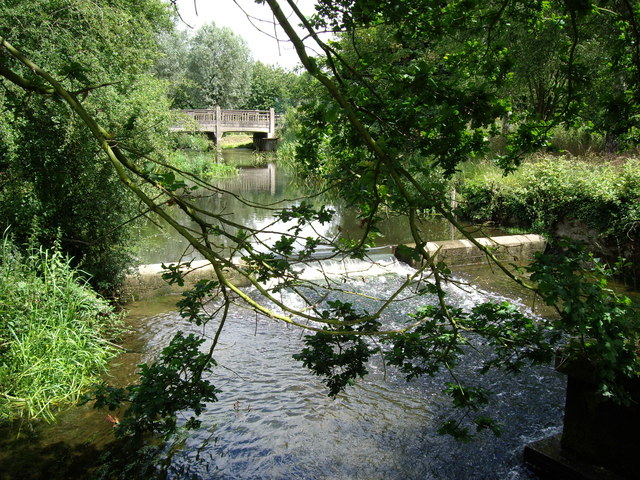
Langford Mill on the River Blackwater

The Museum of Power is located in the former Southend Waterworks Langford Pumping Station. The museum also has a miniature railway, which offers passenger rides.
