= Listed buildings in Black Notley =

Civil Parish in Essex, England

Black Notley is a village and civil parish in the Braintree District of Essex, England. It contains 41 listed buildings that are recorded in the National Heritage List for England. Of these one is grade I, two are grade II* and 39 are grade II.

This list is based on the information retrieved online from Historic England.

== Key ==
Grade	Criteria
I	Buildings that are of exceptional interest
II*	Particularly important buildings of more than special interest
II	Buildings that are of special interest

== Listing ==
Name	Grade	Location	Type	Completed (Note: The date given is the date used by Historic England as significant for the initial building or that of an important part in the structure's description.)	Date designated	Grid ref. (Note: The grid reference is based on the British national grid reference system, sometimes known as OSGB36, used by the Ordnance Survey.) Geo-coordinates	Notes	Entry number (Note: The "List Entry Number" is a unique number assigned to each listed building and scheduled monument by Historic England.)	Image	Wikidata
Barns and Outbuilding Range Adjoining Road and Approximately 30 Metres West of Oak Farmhouse	II	Bakers Lane			2 January 1985	TL7542120796; 51°51′29″N 0°32′45″E		1122805	Upload Photo	Q26415919
Card's	II*	Bakers Lane	building		9 May 1979	TL7449720266; 51°51′13″N 0°31′56″E		1122806	Card's More images	Q17557190
Former Smithy Adjoining Road and Approximately 7 Metres East of John Ray Cottage	II	Bakers Lane			2 January 1985	TL7574220894; 51°51′32″N 0°33′02″E		1122804	Upload Photo	Q26415918
John Ray Cottage	II	Bakers Lane			2 January 1985	TL7573320878; 51°51′32″N 0°33′02″E		1147019	Upload Photo	Q26440103
Oak Farm House	II	Bakers Lane			2 January 1985	TL7546720802; 51°51′30″N 0°32′48″E		1147043	Upload Photo	Q26440126
Ratcliff's	II	Bakers Lane			2 January 1985	TL7551620863; 51°51′31″N 0°32′51″E		1147071	Upload Photo	Q26440153
The Friary	II	Bakers Lane			2 January 1985	TL7435920232; 51°51′12″N 0°31′49″E		1122807	Upload Photo	Q26415920
Barn to North East of Buck Farm	II	Buck Hill			2 January 1985	TL7602421079; 51°51′38″N 0°33′17″E		1122808	Upload Photo	Q26415921
Buck Farm	II	Buck Hill			2 January 1985	TL7600421042; 51°51′37″N 0°33′16″E		1147082	Upload Photo	Q26440164
Wall Adjoining Buck Hill and Running Approximately 40 Metres to South West of Buck Farm	II	Buck Hill			2 January 1985	TL7599021032; 51°51′36″N 0°33′16″E		1147098	Upload Photo	Q26440180
1,2 and 3, Church Road	II	1, 2 and 3, Church Road			2 January 1985	TL7628620866; 51°51′31″N 0°33′31″E		1122809	Upload Photo	Q26415922
Barn Adjoining to the South of Barn North West of Black Notley Hall	II	Church Road			2 January 1985	TL7607520663; 51°51′24″N 0°33′19″E		1122812	Upload Photo	Q26415925
Barn North West of Black Notley Hall	II	Church Road			21 December 1967	TL7606820689; 51°51′25″N 0°33′19″E		1147130	Upload Photo	Q26440208
Black Notley Hall	II	Church Road			2 May 1953	TL7618020628; 51°51′23″N 0°33′25″E		1122811	Upload Photo	Q26415924
Church of St Peter and St Paul	II*	Church Road	church building		21 December 1967	TL7614720722; 51°51′26″N 0°33′23″E		1147111	Church of St Peter and St Paul More images	Q17557479
Monument Approximately 4 Metres South East of South Porch Church of St Peter and St Paul	II	Church Road			2 January 1985	TL7616220715; 51°51′26″N 0°33′24″E		1122810	Upload Photo	Q26415923
Pump House to South West of Barn North West of Black Notley Hall	II	Church Road			2 January 1985	TL7607320630; 51°51′23″N 0°33′19″E		1147151	Upload Photo	Q26440229
Table Tomb in Church Yard of St Peter and St Paul Approximately 3 Metres South East of South Porch	II	Church Road			2 January 1985	TL7615820714; 51°51′26″N 0°33′24″E		1308651	Upload Photo	Q26595230
Barn Approx 15 Metres East of Dagnets Farm House	II	Dagnets Lane			2 January 1985	TL7506519246; 51°50′40″N 0°32′24″E		1308637	Upload Photo	Q26595219
Barn Approximately 20 Metres North East of Friars Farmhouse	II	Dagnets Lane			2 January 1985	TL7435019716; 51°50′56″N 0°31′48″E		1122813	Upload Photo	Q26415926
Barn Approximately 60 Metres South East of Friar's Farmhouse	II	Dagnets Lane			2 January 1985	TL7432419671; 51°50′54″N 0°31′46″E		1147164	Upload Photo	Q26440242
Boundary Stone on Triangle of Land at Junction of Dagnets Lane and Friar's Farm Track	II	Dagnets Lane			2 January 1985	TL7427219696; 51°50′55″N 0°31′43″E		1147176	Upload Photo	Q26440250
Cartlodge Approximately 15 Metres North of Friar's Farmhouse	II	Dagnets Lane			2 January 1985	TL7431119738; 51°50′56″N 0°31′46″E		1338134	Upload Photo	Q26622481
Dagnets Farmhouse	II	Dagnets Lane			2 January 1985	TL7504319227; 51°50′39″N 0°32′23″E		1122814	Upload Photo	Q26415927
Friar's Farmhouse	II	Dagnets Lane			2 January 1985	TL7430919705; 51°50′55″N 0°31′45″E		1338133	Upload Photo	Q26622480
Wren Park Farmhouse	II	Dagnets Lane			2 January 1985	TL7530319302; 51°50′41″N 0°32′37″E		1122815	Upload Photo	Q26415928
Outbuilding Adjacent to North of the Green Dragon	II	London Road			2 January 1985	TL7392319568; 51°50′51″N 0°31′25″E		1338136	Upload Photo	Q26622483
The Green Dragon	II	London Road	pub		2 January 1985	TL7391819553; 51°50′51″N 0°31′25″E		1308605	The Green Dragon More images	Q26595189
Batemans Farmhouse	II	Lynderswood Lane, Great Leighs			2 January 1985	TL7444618351; 51°50′11″N 0°31′50″E		1147209	Upload Photo	Q26440281
20, Witham Road	II	20, Witham Road			2 January 1985	TL7597021196; 51°51′42″N 0°33′15″E		1308591	Upload Photo	Q26595177
The Post Office	II	146 and 144, Witham Road			2 January 1985	TL7685920458; 51°51′17″N 0°34′00″E		1308623	Upload Photo	Q26595205
Barn Approximately 100 Metres North West of Number 45 Park Farm Bungalow	II	Witham Road			2 January 1985	TL7609821104; 51°51′39″N 0°33′21″E		1308585	Upload Photo	Q26595171
Barn Approximately 70 Metres East of Stanton's Farmhouse	II	Witham Road			2 January 1985	TL7690819833; 51°50′57″N 0°34′01″E		1147226	Upload Photo	Q26440296
Barn and Attached Dairy to South East of Hayeswood Farmhouse	II	Witham Road			2 January 1985	TL7559121239; 51°51′44″N 0°32′55″E		1122777	Upload Photo	Q26415892
Cartlodge Approximately 100 Metres North North West of Number 45 Park Farm Bungalow	II	Witham Road			2 January 1985	TL7611021126; 51°51′39″N 0°33′22″E		1122819	Upload Photo	Q26415931
Cartlodge Approximately 30 Metres South East of Hayeswood Farm Complex	II	Witham Road			2 January 1985	TL7561421203; 51°51′42″N 0°32′56″E		1338118	Upload Photo	Q26622465
Dovecote Approximately 10 Metres East of Hayeswood Farm House	II	Witham Road			2 January 1985	TL7558921247; 51°51′44″N 0°32′55″E		1338098	Upload Photo	Q26622444
Farm Complex to South of Hayeswood Farm House	II	Witham Road			2 January 1985	TL7557621206; 51°51′43″N 0°32′54″E		1338117	Upload Photo	Q26622464
Pump Approximately 2 Metres North West of Hayeswood Farm Complex	II	Witham Road			2 January 1985	TL7555421230; 51°51′43″N 0°32′53″E		1122778	Upload Photo	Q26415893
Stanton's Farmhouse	I	Witham Road, CM77 8NH			2 May 1953	TL7686019813; 51°50′56″N 0°33′59″E		1122817	Upload Photo	Q17535825
The Rectory	II	Witham Road			2 January 1985	TL7639520930; 51°51′33″N 0°33′37″E		1338097	Upload Photo	Q26622443
Tollgate Cottage Wilbet Cottage	II	Witham Road			17 August 1979	TL7700320297; 51°51′12″N 0°34′07″E		1122818	Upload Photo	Q26415930

== See also ==
- Grade I listed buildings in Essex
- Grade II* listed buildings in Essex

== Sources ==
- Bettley, James; Pevsner, Nikolaus (2007) [1954], Essex, The Buildings of England, New Haven and London: Yale University Press, ISBN 978-0-300-11614-4
