= Listed buildings in White Notley =

Civil Parish in Essex, England

White Notley is a village and civil parish in the Braintree District of Essex, England. It contains 46 listed buildings that are recorded in the National Heritage List for England. Of these one is grade I, one is grade II* and 44 are grade II.

This list is based on the information retrieved online from Historic England.

== Key ==
Grade	Criteria
I	Buildings that are of exceptional interest
II*	Particularly important buildings of more than special interest
II	Buildings that are of special interest

== Listing ==
Name	Grade	Location	Type	Completed (Note: The date given is the date used by Historic England as significant for the initial building or that of an important part in the structure's description.)	Date designated	Grid ref. (Note: The grid reference is based on the British national grid reference system, sometimes known as OSGB36, used by the Ordnance Survey.) Geo-coordinates	Notes	Entry number (Note: The "List Entry Number" is a unique number assigned to each listed building and scheduled monument by Historic England.)	Image	Wikidata
Barn Approximately 30 Metres West of White Notley Hall	II	Church Hill			2 January 1985	TL7838718387; 51°50′08″N 0°35′16″E		1122740	Upload Photo	Q26415855
Barn Approximately 6 Metres North East of Barn Qv White Notley Hall	II	Church Hill			2 January 1985	TL7837518413; 51°50′09″N 0°35′15″E		1147910	Upload Photo	Q26440893
Cartlodge Attached to South West Angle of White Notley Hall	II	Church Hill			2 January 1985	TL7839618346; 51°50′07″N 0°35′16″E		1122739	Upload Photo	Q26415854
Church of St. Etheldreda	I	Church Hill	church building		2 January 1985	TL7854618236; 51°50′03″N 0°35′24″E		1147914	Church of St. Etheldreda More images	Q17536005
Garden House	II	Church Hill			2 January 1985	TL7853818272; 51°50′04″N 0°35′24″E		1307192	Upload Photo	Q26593889
Stable Range to Rear (east) of Barns White Notley Hall	II	Church Hill			2 January 1985	TL7839918424; 51°50′09″N 0°35′17″E		1122741	Upload Photo	Q26415856
The Vicarage	II	Church Hill			2 January 1985	TL7856818176; 51°50′01″N 0°35′25″E		1122742	Upload Photo	Q26415857
White Notley Hall	II*	Church Hill			2 May 1953	TL7842818344; 51°50′07″N 0°35′18″E		1122738	Upload Photo	Q17557182
Granary Adjacent to North of Cartlodge, Elms	II	Elms, Green Lane			2 January 1985	TL7644719001; 51°50′30″N 0°33′36″E		1168179	Upload Photo	Q26493666
Barn with Attached Pig Sties to Left and Byres to Right Approximately 70 Metres West of Littlebury Farmhouse	II	Fairstead Road			2 January 1985	TL7623218640; 51°50′19″N 0°33′24″E		1238522	Upload Photo	Q26531579
Cartlodge and Stable Range to Left (west) of Barn Complex at Littlebury Farm	II	Fairstead Road			2 January 1985	TL7622818627; 51°50′18″N 0°33′24″E		1122743	Upload Photo	Q26415858
Farm Outbuilding Approximately 10 Metres East of Westcocks Farmhouse	II	Fairstead Road			2 January 1985	TL7637118066; 51°50′00″N 0°33′30″E		1122745	Upload Photo	Q26415860
Granary Approximately 20 Metres South of Westcocks Farmhouse	II	Fairstead Road			2 January 1985	TL7637418045; 51°49′59″N 0°33′30″E		1168121	Upload Photo	Q26493610
Granary and Stables Attached Forward Right East of Barn Complex at Littlebury Farm	II	Fairstead Road			2 January 1985	TL7624818639; 51°50′19″N 0°33′25″E		1168097	Upload Photo	Q26461506
Lawn's Farmhouse	II	Fairstead Road			2 January 1985	TL7612518476; 51°50′14″N 0°33′18″E		1122744	Upload Photo	Q26415859
Littlebury Farmhouse	II	Fairstead Road			20 August 1991	TL7627318636; 51°50′19″N 0°33′26″E		1338170	Upload Photo	Q26622518
Westocks Farmhouse	II	Fairstead Road			2 May 1953	TL7635618061; 51°50′00″N 0°33′29″E		1168106	Upload Photo	Q26493595
Barn Approximately 30 Metres (east) of Barn, Fambridge Hall	II	Fambridge Hall, Fambridge Hall Lane			2 January 1985	TL7870818848; 51°50′23″N 0°35′33″E		1239001	Upload Photo	Q26532023
Barn Adjacent to North of Barn at Fambridge Hall	II	Fambridge Hall Lane			2 January 1985	TL7869818874; 51°50′24″N 0°35′33″E		1307151	Upload Photo	Q26593852
Barn Approximately 30 Metres North East of Fambridge Hall	II	Fambridge Hall Lane			2 January 1985	TL7868118864; 51°50′23″N 0°35′32″E		1338142	Upload Photo	Q26622489
Cartlodge Approximately 70 Metres West of Fambridge Hall	II	Fambridge Hall Lane			2 January 1985	TL7862018848; 51°50′23″N 0°35′29″E		1168145	Upload Photo	Q26493633
Coach House to North East of Fambridge Hall	II	Fambridge Hall Lane			2 January 1985	TL7871618827; 51°50′22″N 0°35′34″E		1122747	Upload Photo	Q26415862
Fambridge Hall	II	Fambridge Hall Lane			2 January 1985	TL7867618817; 51°50′22″N 0°35′32″E		1122746	Upload Photo	Q26415861
Stable Adjacent to Right of Coach House at Fambridge Hall	II	Fambridge Hall Lane			2 January 1985	TL7872218828; 51°50′22″N 0°35′34″E		1122748	Upload Photo	Q26415863
Barn Approximately 20 Metres to North West of Elms Farmhouse	II	Green Lane			2 January 1985	TL7646919036; 51°50′31″N 0°33′37″E		1122749	Upload Photo	Q26415864
Barn Approximately 30 Metres North East of Elms Farmhouse	II	Green Lane			2 January 1985	TL7651019025; 51°50′31″N 0°33′39″E		1307128	Upload Photo	Q26593830
Cartlodge Approximately 50 Metres West of Elms Farmhouse	II	Green Lane			2 January 1985	TL7644718992; 51°50′30″N 0°33′36″E		1338143	Upload Photo	Q26622490
Elms Farmhouse	II	Green Lane			2 January 1985	TL7649418999; 51°50′30″N 0°33′38″E		1307121	Upload Photo	Q26593823
Attached Barn, Pigsties and Cartlodge to South East of Barn at Stanfield's Farm	II	Witham Road			2 January 1985	TL7872318223; 51°50′02″N 0°35′33″E		1338169	Upload Photo	Q26622517
Lindsey Cottage	II	9, Station Road			2 January 1985	TL7862318433; 51°50′09″N 0°35′28″E		1338144	Upload Photo	Q26622491
Haven Cottage	II	11, Station Road			2 January 1985	TL7873118514; 51°50′12″N 0°35′34″E		1168198	Upload Photo	Q26493682
Granary Approximately 8 Metres East of Pennet's Farmhouse Q V	II	The Green			2 January 1985	TL7765219191; 51°50′35″N 0°34′39″E		1122752	Upload Photo	Q26415867
Greenacres	II	The Green			2 January 1985	TL7734119473; 51°50′44″N 0°34′23″E		1168249	Upload Photo	Q26461516
Pennett's Farmhouse	II	The Green			21 December 1967	TL7764019154; 51°50′34″N 0°34′38″E		1168226	Upload Photo	Q26493710
Plough Cottage	II	The Green			2 January 1985	TL7732719480; 51°50′45″N 0°34′23″E		1122753	Upload Photo	Q26415868
The Plough	II	The Green			2 January 1985	TL7731419520; 51°50′46″N 0°34′22″E		1338146	Upload Photo	Q26622493
Westbourne Cottage	II	The Green			2 January 1985	TL7720719562; 51°50′48″N 0°34′16″E		1168239	Upload Photo	Q26493721
Cottage and Post Office Stores	II	2, The Street			21 December 1967	TL7858318388; 51°50′08″N 0°35′26″E		1122751	Upload Photo	Q26415866
Collins Builders the Cottage	II	4 and 6, The Street			21 December 1967	TL7857018404; 51°50′08″N 0°35′25″E		1307096	Upload Photo	Q26593801
8,10,12 and 14, the Street	II	8, 10, 12 and 14, The Street			2 January 1985	TL7855918419; 51°50′09″N 0°35′25″E		1338145	Upload Photo	Q26622492
The Cross Keys	II	The Street	pub		21 December 1967	TL7855018388; 51°50′08″N 0°35′24″E		1122750	The Cross Keys More images	Q26415865
Barn Attached to South West of at Stanfield's Farm	II	Witham Road			2 January 1985	TL7872918241; 51°50′03″N 0°35′33″E		1122755	Upload Photo	Q26415870
Barn and Attached Out Buildings to Left (north West) of Stanfield's Farmhouse	II	Witham Road			2 January 1985	TL7875218253; 51°50′03″N 0°35′35″E		1122754	Upload Photo	Q26415869
Forge Cottage	II	Witham Road			2 January 1985	TL7881017728; 51°49′46″N 0°35′37″E		1338147	Upload Photo	Q26622494
Stanfield's Farmhouse	II	Witham Road			2 January 1985	TL7877718224; 51°50′02″N 0°35′36″E		1168254	Upload Photo	Q26461520
Wall and Attached Outbuilding to East of Farmyard Complex at Stanfield's Farm	II	Witham Road			2 January 1985	TL7874418214; 51°50′02″N 0°35′34″E		1122715	Upload Photo	Q26415832

== See also ==
- Grade I listed buildings in Essex
- Grade II* listed buildings in Essex

== Sources ==
- Bettley, James; Pevsner, Nikolaus (2007) [1954], Essex, The Buildings of England, New Haven and London: Yale University Press, ISBN 978-0-300-11614-4
