= Black Notley =

Village in Essex, England

Coordinates: 51°51′07″N 0°33′58″E

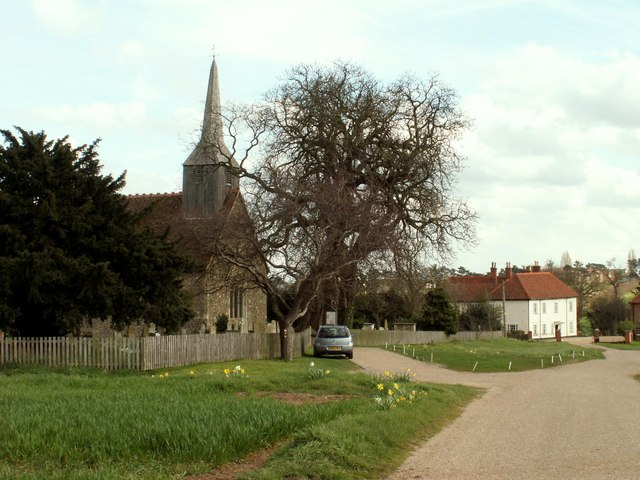
- Black Notley church and Hall

- Location within Essex
- Population: 2,588 (Parish, 2021); 1,952 (Built up area, 2021)
- OS grid reference: TL764210
- District: Braintree
- Shire county: Essex
- Region: East
- Country: England
- Sovereign state: United Kingdom
- Post town: BRAINTREE
- Postcode district: CM77
- Dialling code: 01376
- Police: Essex
- Fire: Essex
- Ambulance: East of England
- UK Parliament: Witham

Black Notley is a village and civil parish in Essex, England. It is located approximately 1 1/2 miles (2.4 km) south of Braintree and is 9 miles (14 km) north-northeast from the county town of Chelmsford. As well as the village itself, the parish also includes rural areas including the hamlets of Row Green and Young's End. At the 2021 census the Black Notley built up area had a population of 1,952 and the parish had a population of 2,589.

== History ==
The place-name 'Notley' is first attested in a Saxon charter of 998 as Hnutlea, and appears as 'Nutlea' in the Domesday Book of 1086. The name means 'nut wood'. 'Black Notley' is first attested in 1240.

The parish church is dedicated to both St. Peter and St. Paul, and has walls of flint and pebble. The nave was constructed in the 12th century and the chancel was rebuilt around the 16th century when also the south porch and bell-turret were added. Around 100 yards to the south of the church is the 15th-century Grade II-listed Black Notley Hall.

== Geography ==
The village is in the district of Braintree, but as of 2010, forms part of the parliamentary constituency of Witham. It has its own parish council, and is part of the wider Cressing, Black Notley, White Notley and Faulkbourne parish cluster.

It is close to the River Brain. In 2002, work was completed on the new estate, built in place of the old hospital giving 350 new houses to the area.

== Transport ==
The village is served by the Braintree Branch Line via Cressing railway station located just outside the village

== Notable residents ==
- William Bedell (1571–1642), Anglican churchman, Bishop of Kilmore and Provost of Trinity College Dublin.
- Richard Symonds (1617–1660), royalist and antiquary, he wrote about the First English Civil War.
- John Ray (1627–1705), naturalist, known as the father of English natural history.
- Arthur Halestrap (1898–2004), one of the last surviving soldiers of WWI, lived locally
