= Langford and Ulting railway station =

Former railway station in England

Coordinates: 51.748°N 0.6666°E

Langford and Ulting

General information
- Location: Langford, Essex, Maldon; England
- Platforms: 1

Other information
- Status: Disused

History
- Original company: Maldon, Witham & Braintree Railway; Eastern Counties Railway
- Pre-grouping: Great Eastern Railway
- Post-grouping: London and North Eastern Railway

Key dates
- 2 October 1848: Opened as Langford
- 1 July 1923: Renamed Langford and Ulting
- 7 September 1964: Closed
Location

Langford and Ulting railway station served the village of Langford, Essex. It was opened in 1848 by the Maldon, Witham & Braintree Railway (MWBR) on a branch line from Witham to Maldon East and Heybridge.

It was originally named Langford but was renamed Langford and Ulting in 1923. The station was 4 miles 38 chains (7.20 km) from Witham.

The line and station closed to passenger services in 1964 as part of the Beeching closures.

Preceding station	Disused railways	Following station
Wickham Bishops	Great Eastern Railway; Witham–Maldon branch line	Maldon East and Heybridge
