= Ulting =

Village in Essex, England

Coordinates: 51°45′01″N 0°36′35″E

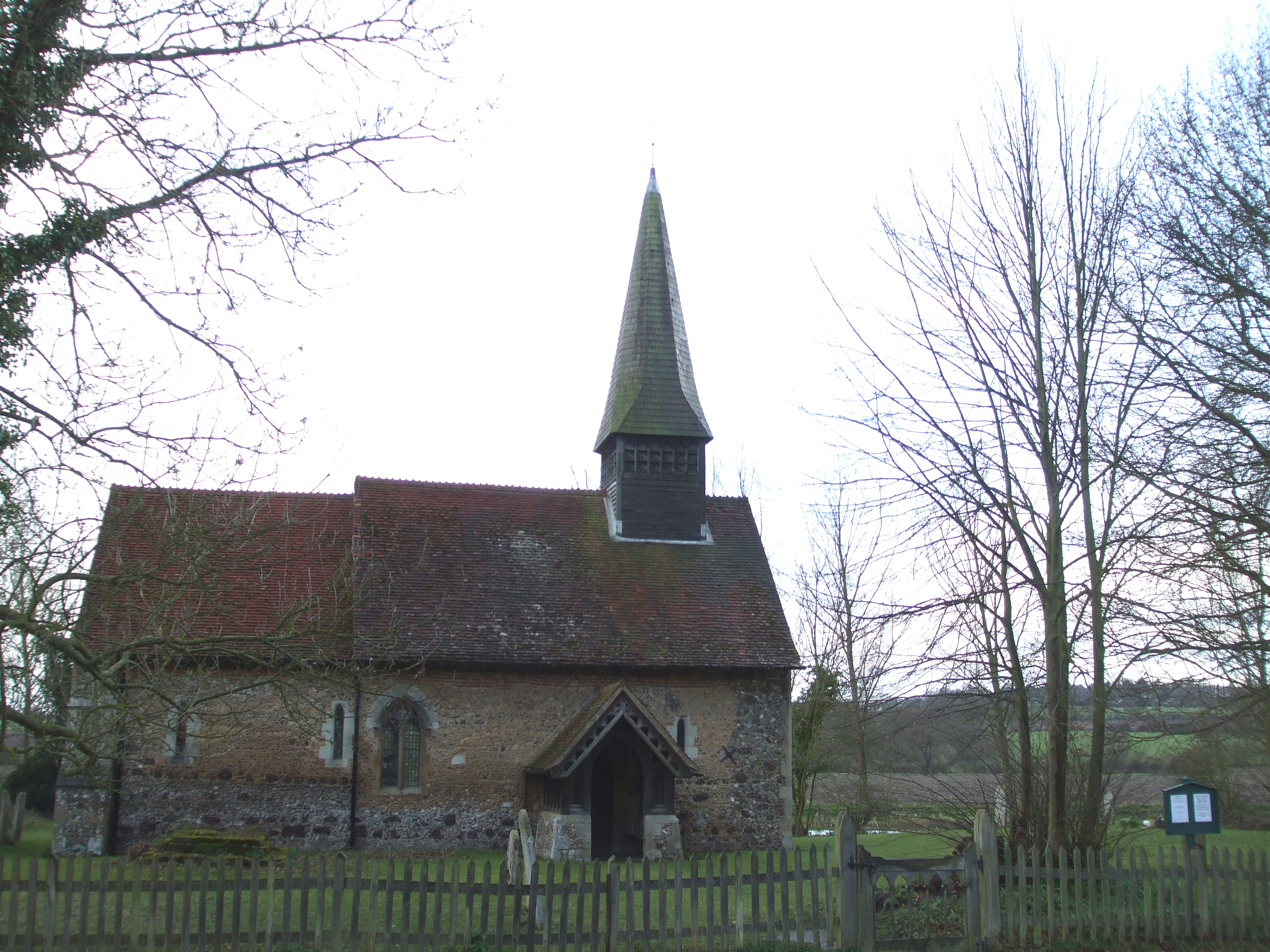
- All Saints' Church

- Location within Essex
- Population: 166 (Parish, 2021)
- District: Maldon
- Shire county: Essex
- Region: East
- Country: England
- Sovereign state: United Kingdom
- Post town: Chelmsford
- Postcode district: CM9
- Police: Essex
- Fire: Essex
- Ambulance: East of England
- UK Parliament: Witham

Ulting is a small village and civil parish in the Maldon district, in the county of Essex, England. It shares its borders with Langford and Nounsley. It is the location of Ulting Wick garden. At the 2021 census the parish had a population of 166. Ulting shares a grouped parish council with the neighbouring parish of Langford.

== History ==
Ulting was the location of the first sugar beet factory in England, although its useful life was cut short by cheap imports of cane sugar.

Ernest Doe & Sons produced farm machinery in the 1950s and 1960s, including the odd Doe Triple-D tractor.

== Church ==
All Saints, the village church, has been standing since 1150, with a major restoration taking place in the 1870s. The church was once a place of pilgrimage ranking with Walsingham and other famous shrines. The River Chelmer runs next to the church and through Ulting.

The church and river was the filming location of folk-rock band Smoke Fairies’ 2023 music video, “Vanishing Line”.

== Governance ==
There are three tiers of local government covering Ulting, at parish, district, and county level: Langford and Ulting Parish Council, Maldon District Council, and Essex County Council. The parish council is a grouped parish council, also covering the neighbouring parish of Langford. It meets at the Langford and Ulting Village Hall in Langford.

== Notable residents ==
The photographer and designer Humphrey Spender, a younger brother of the poet Stephen Spender, lived in Ulting for many years before his death in 2005.
