= Tye Green =

Village in Essex, England

Coordinates: 51.8599°N 0.5842°E

- Location within Essex
- Area: 0.417 km^{2} (0.161 sq mi)
- Population: 1,114 (2018 estimate)
  - Density: 2,671/km^{2} (6,920/sq mi)
- OS grid reference: TL780210
- District: Braintree
- Shire county: Essex
- Region: East
- Country: England
- Sovereign state: United Kingdom
- Post town: Chelmsford
- Postcode district: CM77
- Police: Essex
- Fire: Essex
- Ambulance: East of England
- UK Parliament: Braintree

Tye Green is a village in the civil parish of Cressing and the Braintree district of Essex, England. In 2018, it had an estimated population of 1,114.
