= Rank's Green =

Hamlet in Essex, England

Coordinates: 51.833°N 0.537°E

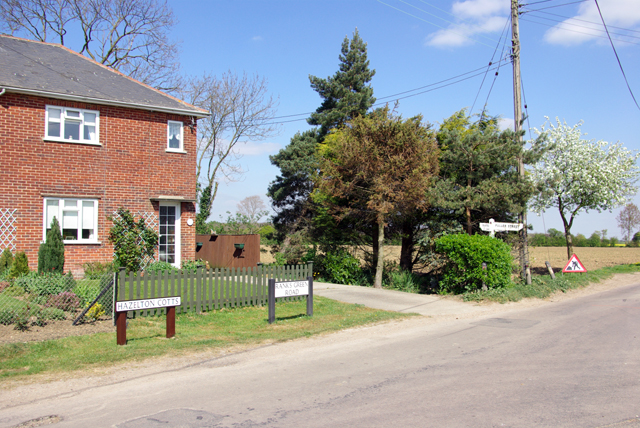

- Location within Essex
- Civil parish: Fairstead
- District: Braintree
- Shire county: Essex
- Region: East
- Country: England
- Sovereign state: United Kingdom
- Police: Essex
- Fire: Essex
- Ambulance: East of England

Rank's Green or Ranks Green is a hamlet in the civil parish of Fairstead, in the Braintree district, in the county of Essex, England. Nearby settlements include the town of Braintree and the villages of Great Leighs and Fairstead and the hamlet of Gubbion's Green.
