= Ulting Wick =

Garden in Essex, England

Coordinates: 51.748°N 0.614°E

Ulting Wick is a 11-acre (4.5 ha) garden, situated at Ulting near Maldon in Essex, UK. It is centred around three listed black Essex barns and a 16th-century farmhouse. It is open to the public, by appointment, under the National Garden Scheme.

The garden was voted one of the country’s top 100 gardens to visit by Garden News magazine and has been described as "a garden jewel". In November and December every year thousands of tulips are planted. In the summer they are followed by tender exotics and, in the late-summer, by dahlias.

In July 2021 the garden, and its owner Philippa Burrough, were featured on BBC's Gardeners' World.
