= Barons Lane Halt railway station =

Disused railway station in Purleigh, Essex

Coordinates: 51.6906°N 0.6701°E

Barons Lane Halt

General information
- Location: Purleigh, Maldon; England
- Grid reference: TL846025
- Platforms: 1

Other information
- Status: Disused

History
- Original company: Great Eastern Railway
- Pre-grouping: Great Eastern Railway
- Post-grouping: London and North Eastern Railway

Key dates
- 10 July 1922: Opened
- 10 September 1939: Closed
Location

Barons Lane Halt railway station was a halt that served the village of Purleigh, Essex. It was 4 miles 24 chains (6.92 km) from Wickford Junction. The sidings at this location were opened with the line on 1 October 1889, but the halt was not opened until 10 July 1922 by the Great Eastern Railway on the branch line (Engineer's Line Reference WFM) from Woodham Ferrers to Maldon East.

It was closed in September 1939 but the line remained in use for goods traffic until 1959. Vic Mitchell says that freight traffic ceased on 1 April 1953.

Preceding station	Disused railways	Following station
Maldon West Halt	Great Eastern Railway; Maldon to Woodham Ferrers branch line	Cold Norton
