= Braintree branch line =

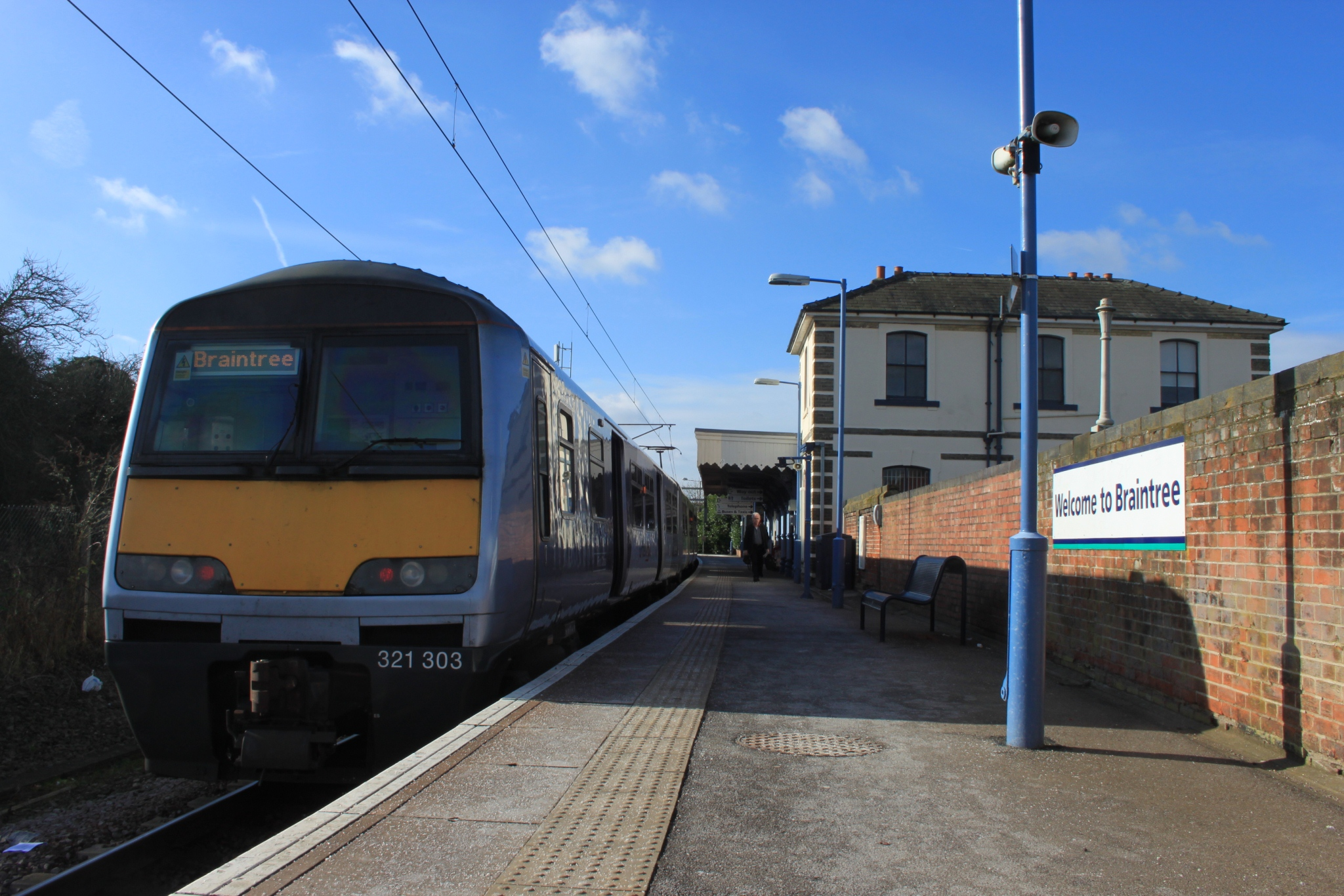
- Braintree is the western terminus of the line

Overview
- Status: Operational
- Owner: Network Rail
- Locale: East of England
- Termini: Witham; Braintree
- Stations: 5

Service
- Type: Regional rail
- System: National Rail
- Services: 1
- Operator(s): Greater Anglia
- Rolling stock: Class 720

History
- Opened: 1848

Technical
- Line length: 6 miles 30 chains (10.3 km)
- Number of tracks: 1
- Character: Branch line
- Track gauge: 4 ft 8 1/2 in (1,435 mm) standard gauge
- Electrification: 25 kV AC OHLE
Route map
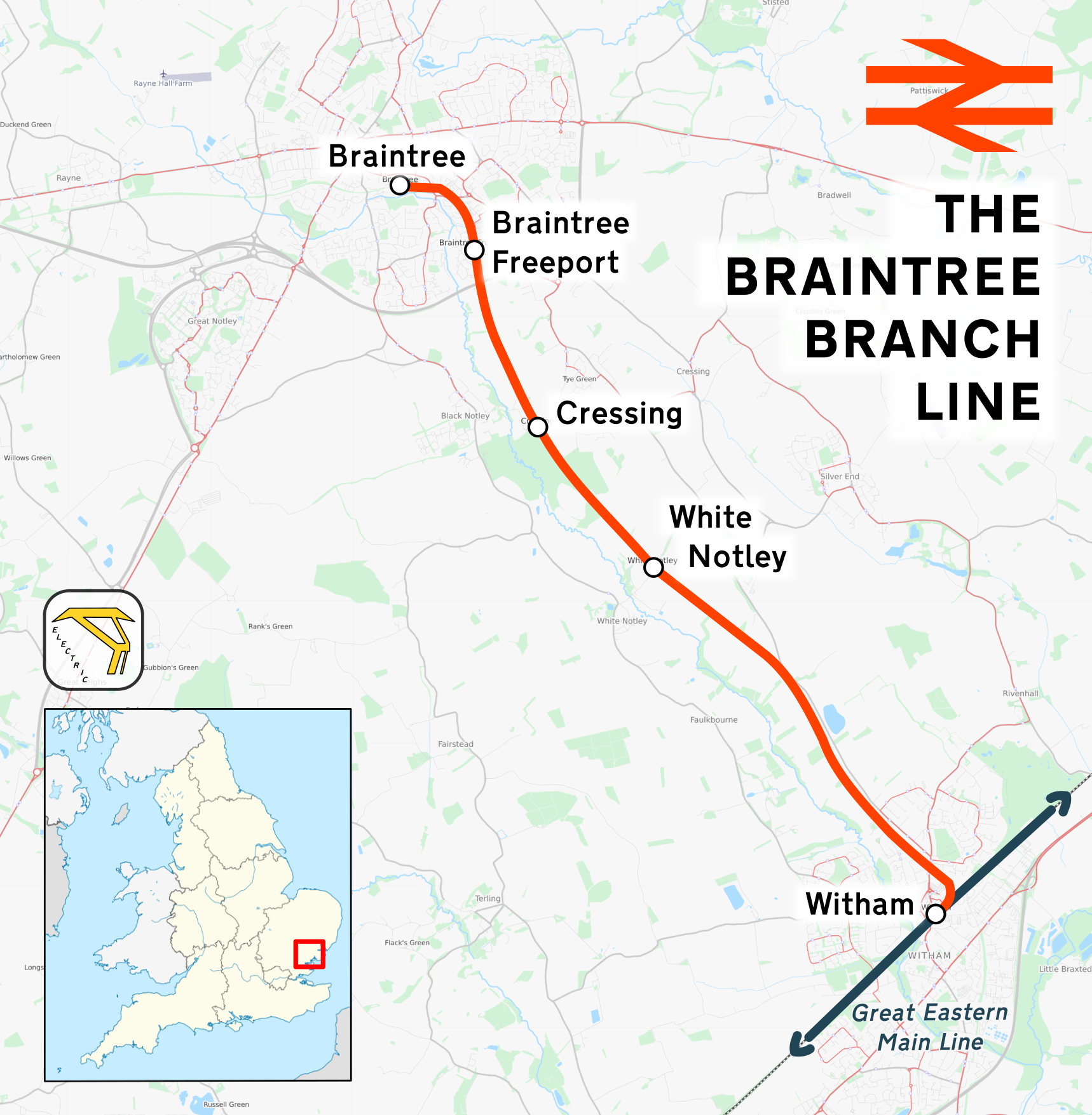
(Click to expand)

The Braintree branch line is a railway branch line in the East of England that diverges from the Great Eastern Main Line at Witham and runs north-west to Braintree. The route is 6 miles 30 chains (10.3 km) in length and there are five stations, including the two termini. The line is part of Network Rail Strategic Route 7, SRS 07.06, and is classified as a London and South-East commuter line.

The stations and all services are currently operated by Greater Anglia. As of 2019 the typical off-peak weekday service-frequency is one train per hour in each direction. The timetabled journey time between Witham and Braintree is 16 minutes.

== History ==
Originally constructed from Maldon to Braintree via Witham, only the line from Braintree to Witham remains open. The line was proposed by the Maldon, Witham & Braintree Railway (MWBR) and given royal assent in June 1846. The MWBR was subsequently purchased by the Eastern Counties Railway (ECR), and the line opened in 1848.

The section from Maldon to Witham was constructed as double-track, however one track was lifted during the period of the Crimean War (1854–56) and sold to the War Office.

The Bishop's Stortford–Braintree branch line, built by the Great Eastern Railway (GER), was opened in 1869. This created a route from Maldon through to the West Anglia Main Line.

The line was extended from Maldon to Woodham Ferrers in 1889.

In 1923, both lines became part of the London and North Eastern Railway (LNER).

During the Second World War passenger services on the section between Maldon East and Heybridge and Woodham Ferrers were withdrawn and never reinstated.

The Bishop's Stortford–Braintree branch closed to passenger traffic in 1952 and then to freight in 1971. A railbus was tried in the early 1960s on the branches from Witham to Maldon East and Braintree. The section from Maldon East and Heybridge to Witham was closed to passengers following the Beeching cuts to the railways in 1964, although goods services on that section continued until 1966. Conversely, the Witham-Braintree section saw an upsurge in passengers, and the railbus was then replaced by a diesel multiple unit to give sufficient capacity. The line was electrified in October 1977, becoming a rare example of a single-track electrified passenger line in Britain. Most trains then ran through to London.

The franchise for the line is currently held by Greater Anglia.

== Infrastructure ==
The line is single-track throughout and the route is electrified at 25 kV AC. It has a loading gauge of W6 and a maximum line speed of 50 mph (80 km/h).

Services are formed of Class 720 units. The first entered service on 16 December 2020.

Most of the former railway alignment between just east of Bishops Stortford and Braintree has been preserved, and is managed by Essex County Council as the Flitch Way linear park. Two local groups volunteer to improve the site and campaign for improvements.

=== Stations ===
The following table summarises the line's five stations, their distance measured from London Liverpool Street, and estimated number of passenger entries/exits in 2018–19:

| Station | Location | Local authority | Mileage | Patronage |
|---|---|---|---|---|
| Witham | Witham | District of Braintree | 38 1/2 | 2,349,496 |
| White Notley | White Notley | District of Braintree | 41 3/4 | 12,046 |
| Cressing | Cressing and Black Notley | District of Braintree | 43 | 39,010 |
| Braintree Freeport | Braintree | District of Braintree | 44 1/4 | 91,574 |
| Braintree | Braintree | District of Braintree | 45 | 727,982 |
