= Stow St Mary Halt railway station =

Former railway station in England

Stow St Mary Halt

General information
- Location: Stow Maries, Maldon; England
- Coordinates: 51.6612°N 0.6514°E
- Grid reference: TQ834991
- Platforms: 1

Other information
- Status: Disused

History
- Original company: London and North Eastern Railway
- Post-grouping: London and North Eastern Railway

Key dates
- 24 September 1928: Opened
- 10 September 1939: Closed
Location

Stow St. Mary Halt railway station was a halt that served the village of Stow Maries, Essex.

It was opened on 24 September 1928 by the London and North Eastern Railway on the single-track branch line (Engineer's Line Reference WFM) that the Great Eastern Railway had opened on 1 October 1889 linking Woodham Ferrers to Maldon East. The station served the village of Stow Maries, but the station was named differently supposedly on the insistence of the vicar.

It was closed in September 1939 but the line remained in use for goods traffic until 1959 or 1953. It is now Stow Maries Halt nature reserve, which is managed by the Essex Wildlife Trust.

Preceding station	Disused railways	Following station
Cold Norton	London and North Eastern Railway; Maldon to Woodham Ferrers branch line	Woodham Ferrers
