= Cold Norton railway station =

Former railway station in England

Cold Norton
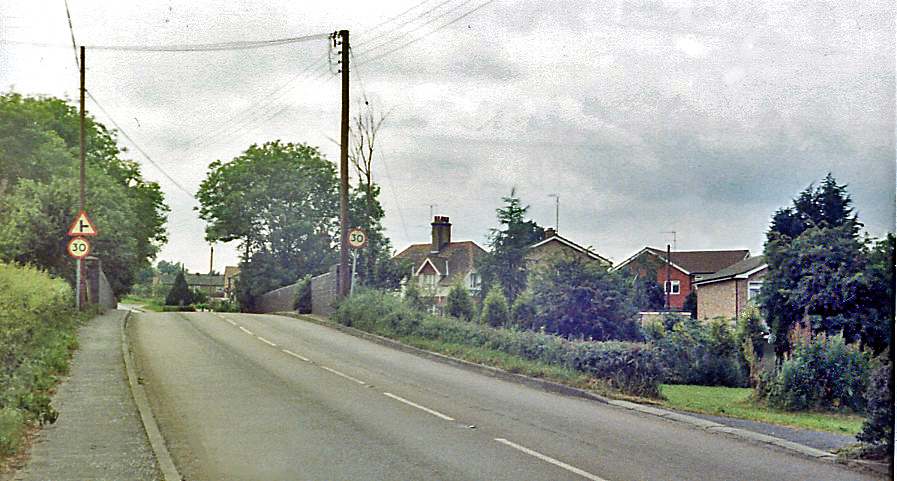
- Location of the railway bridge and railway workers cottages in 1984

General information
- Location: Cold Norton, Maldon; England
- Coordinates: 51.6718°N 0.6738°E
- Platforms: 1

Other information
- Status: Disused

History
- Original company: Great Eastern Railway
- Pre-grouping: Great Eastern Railway
- Post-grouping: London and North Eastern Railway

Key dates
- 1 October 1889: Opened
- 10 September 1939: Closed
Location

Cold Norton railway station served the village of Cold Norton, Essex. It was opened on 1 October 1889 by the Great Eastern Railway on a single-track branch line (Engineer's Line Reference WFM) from Woodham Ferrers to Maldon East. The station was 3 miles 31 chains (5.45 km) from Wickford Junction and had a single platform on the west side of the running line and a passing (goods) loop, a station building, a parcels shed, goods sidings, and a 30-level signal box which was reduced to a ground frame in 1939. The station name was originally Cold Norton for Purleigh and Stow Maries this was later changed to Cold Norton for Latchingdon.

There was a fatal railway accident near Cold Norton in 1899.

The station was closed to passengers in September 1939 but the line remained in use for goods traffic until 1953 1959.

Preceding station	Disused railways	Following station
Barons Lane Halt	Great Eastern Railway; Maldon to Woodham Ferrers branch line	Stow St. Mary Halt
