= Cressing =

Village in Essex, England

Coordinates: 51.85873°N 0.602188°E

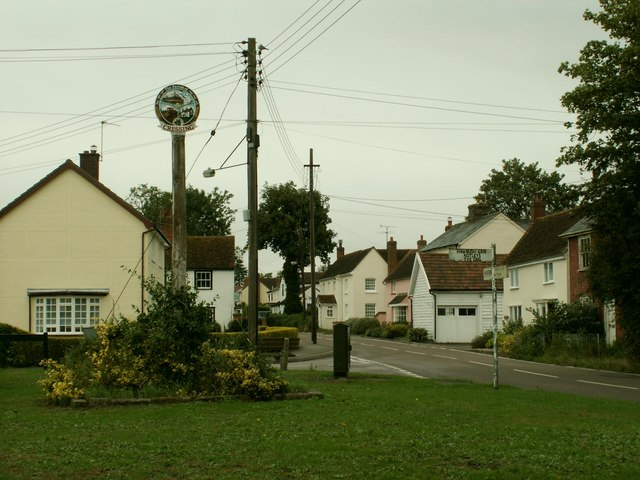
- Cressing village

- Location within Essex
- Population: 1,988 (Parish, 2021)
- OS grid reference: TL792209
- Civil parish: Cressing
- District: Braintree
- Shire county: Essex
- Region: East
- Country: England
- Sovereign state: United Kingdom
- Post town: Braintree
- Postcode district: CM77
- Dialling code: 01376
- Police: Essex
- Fire: Essex
- Ambulance: East of England
- UK Parliament: Braintree

Cressing is a village and civil parish in the Braintree district of Essex, England. Within the parish is the village of Tye Green and the hamlet of Hawbush Green. At the 2021 census the parish had a population of 1,988.

Cressing Temple is 1.5 miles (2.4 km) south from Cressing village, and less than 1 mile east from the village of White Notley. It is nestled between Braintree and Witham, just a couple of miles or one train stop to Braintree Shopping Village, formerly Freeport.

The parish contains two churches, one public house, one restaurant and a business park. A men's Sunday League and youth football teams play at Cressing Sports and Social Club in Tye Green. Cressing railway station, on the Braintree Branch Line, is at the west of the parish.

In 2020, an archaeological dig by Oxford Archaeology discovered an iron age village with over 17 roundhouse. The village was destroyed during the 1st century AD, and may have been reprisals by the Romans after the Boudican uprising of AD 60/61.

Sir Evelyn Wood (1838–1919), a Field Marshal and Victoria Cross recipient, was born at Cressing.
