= Stow Maries =

Village in Essex, England

Coordinates: 51.664°N 0.649°E

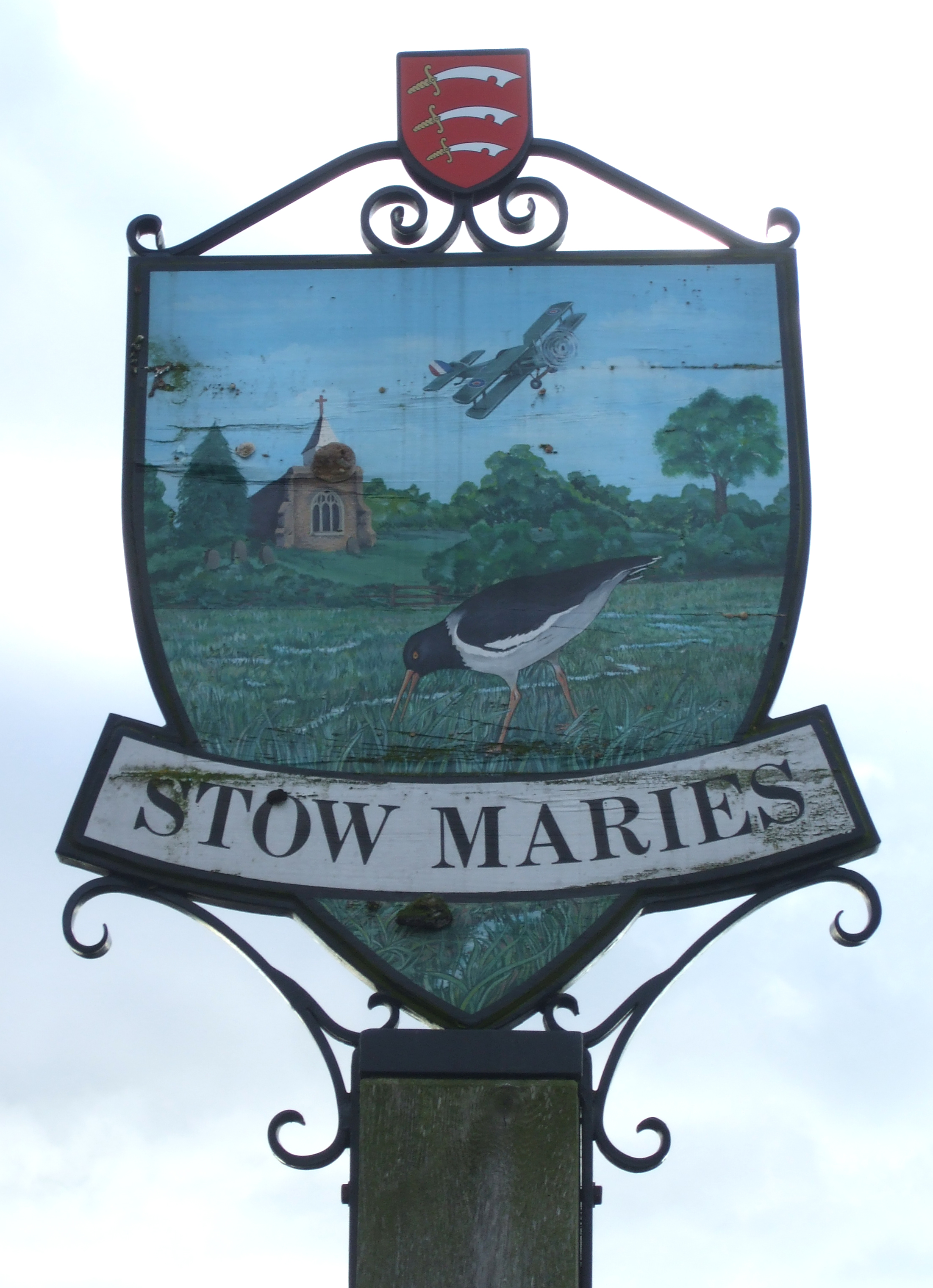
- Village Sign

- Location within Essex
- Population: 209 (Parish, 2021)
- OS grid reference: TQ833995
- District: Maldon
- Shire county: Essex
- Region: East
- Country: England
- Sovereign state: United Kingdom
- Post town: Chelmsford
- Postcode district: CM3
- Dialling code: 01245 & 01621
- Police: Essex
- Fire: Essex
- Ambulance: East of England
- UK Parliament: Maldon

Stow Maries is a village and civil parish in the English county of Essex. It is located on the western (inland) end of the Dengie peninsula and forms part of the Purleigh ward in the Maldon district. At the 2021 census the parish had a population of 209.

The place-name 'Stow Maries' is first attested in the Feet of Fines for 1230, where it appears as Stowe. In a Feudal aid of 1420 it appears as Stowe Mareys. The name means 'place belonging to the Marisc family'. (Robert de Marisc held the manor in 1250. The name comes from Marais in France, meaning 'marsh' – the words are cognate.)

== Stow Maries Aerodrome ==
An aerodrome was established at Stow Maries in September 1916 during the First World War for the Royal Flying Corps. By 1919 the need for airfields lessened and Stow Maries was closed. The site was considered for development as an airfield during the Second World War but considered unsuitable due to the clay soil. Even though not opened it played a role nonetheless, being bombed by the Luftwaffe and used as an emergency landing site by a damaged Hawker Hurricane.

The airfield buildings are still mostly intact, with the original windows still in place. The buildings were used to store grain and farm vehicles until 2008. The airfield is being restored to a state that it would have been found in 1919.

== Stow Maries Halt ==
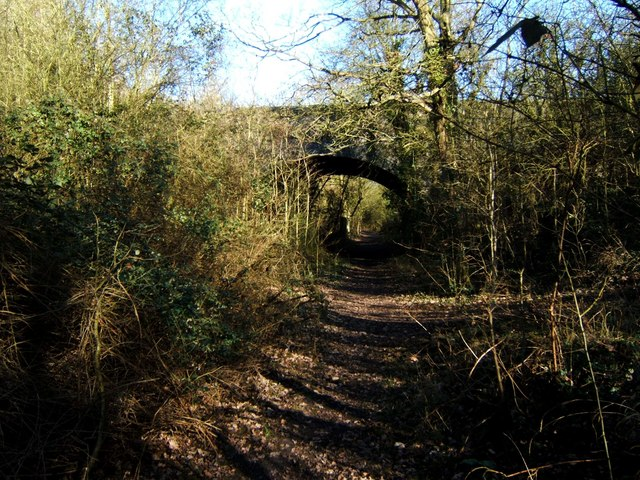
Stow Maries Halt, now a nature reserve

Stow St Mary Halt railway station on the Woodham Ferrers to Maldon branch line served the village until closure in 1939. The track has been removed and the area and an adjoining meadow are now managed as Stow Maries Halt nature reserve by the Essex Wildlife Trust. It can be reached from Church Lane. Ordnance Survey grid reference (TQ835991).

== Local amenities ==
Stow Maries has one public house, The Prince of Wales. There is a table tennis team, which trains in the Smythe Hall, many footpaths and the old railway line, part of which is used as a cycle route.

== Religious sites ==
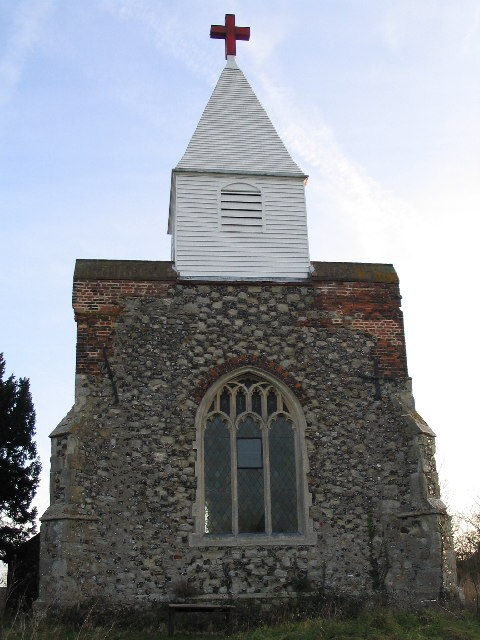
Church of St Mary and St Margaret

The local parish church is the Church of St Mary and St Margaret in the Maldon and Dengie Deanery, part of the Diocese of Chelmsford.

The church has a 14th-century chancel and a 15th-century nave that was extended in the 16th century. Some refurbishment took place in 1870.

The north vestry was added in 1912 and rebuilt in 1950.

The Rectory House (now The Old Rectory) was built in 1799 and is thought to have been designed by Humphry Repton assisted by his son John Adey Repton.
