= Stow Maries Halt =

Nature reserve in Essex, England

Coordinates: 51.661°N 0.652°E

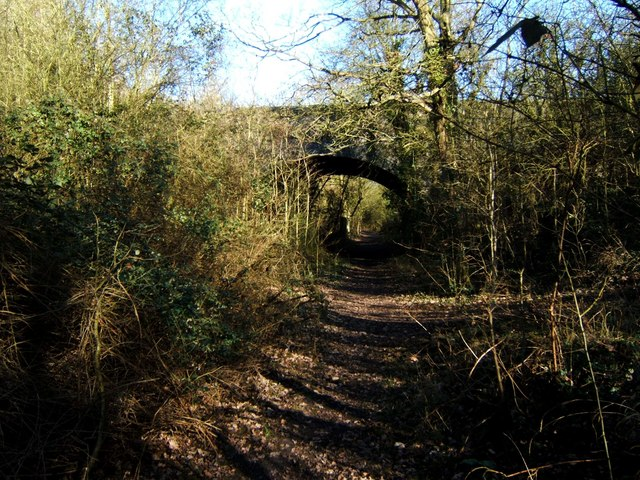
- Interactive map of Stow Maries Halt
- Type: Nature reserve
- Location: Stow Maries, Essex
- OS grid: TQ 835 991
- Area: 2.2 hectares (5.4 acres)
- Manager: Essex Wildlife Trust

Stow Maries Halt is a 2.2-hectare (5.4-acre) nature reserve south of Stow Maries in Essex. It is owned and managed by the Essex Wildlife Trust.

The former Stow St Mary Halt railway station has marshes, a pond and scrub, together with adjoining pasture which is also part of the reserve. Butterflies include purple and white-letter hairstreaks, and there are flowers such as common fleabane and wild carrot.

There is access from Church Lane.
