= Braintree Freeport railway station =

Railway station in Essex, England

Braintree Freeport
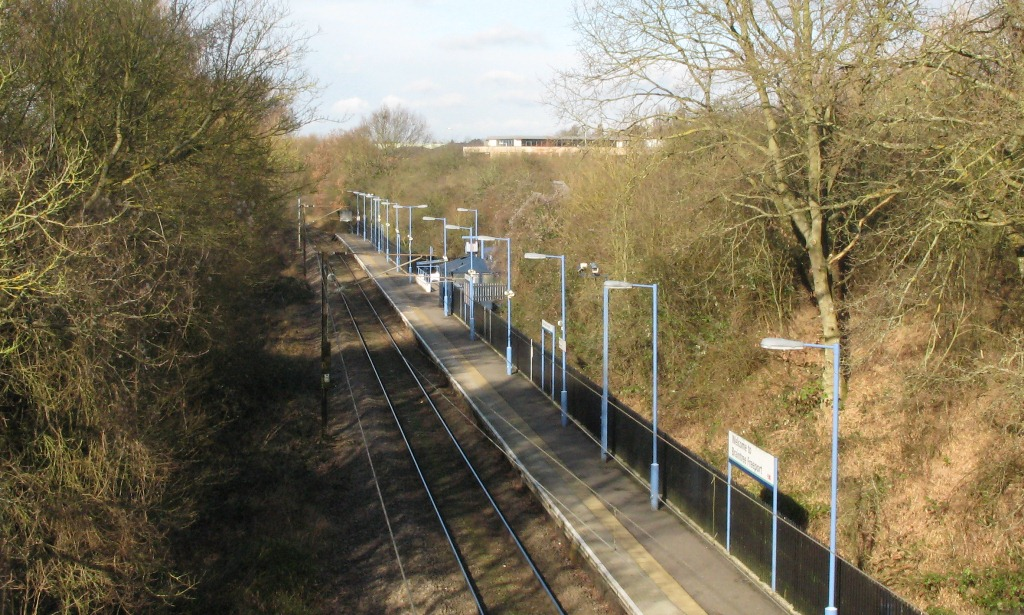
- Braintree Freeport railway station in 2013

General information
- Location: Braintree, Braintree; England
- Coordinates: 51.869°N 0.567°E
- Grid reference: TL769220
- Managed by: Greater Anglia
- Platforms: 1

Other information
- Station code: BTP
- Classification: DfT category F2

History
- Opened: 8 November 1999

Passengers
- 2020/21: ▼26,098
- 2021/22: ▲91,064
- 2022/23: ▲109,306
- 2023/24: ▲124,202
- 2024/25: ▲141,614
Location
Notes
- Passenger statistics from the Office of Rail and Road

Braintree Freeport railway station is on the Braintree Branch Line in the East of England, serving the Braintree Village shopping centre (formerly known as Braintree Freeport). It is 44 miles 16 chains (71.13 km) down the line from London Liverpool Street via Witham and it is situated between Cressing to the south and Braintree to the north. Its three-letter station code is BTP. The platform has an operational length for eight-coach trains.

The station is managed by Greater Anglia, which also operates all trains serving it. It is also the exit for the Braintree Village Shopping.

== History ==
The station was opened on 8 November 1999. There is a single, unstaffed platform with a shelter and a self-service ticket machine but there is no station building or other facilities.

== Services ==
All services at Braintree Freeport are operated by Greater Anglia using Class 720 EMUs.

The typical off-peak service is one train per hour in each direction between Braintree and London Liverpool Street via Witham with additional services calling at the station during the peak hours.

On Sundays, southbound services at the station run only as far as Witham.

Preceding station	National Rail	Following station
Cressing	Greater Anglia Braintree Branch Line	Braintree
