= Fuller Street =

Hamlet in Essex, England

Coordinates: 51.8155°N 0.5333°E

- Location within Essex
- Civil parish: Fairstead
- District: Braintree
- Shire county: Essex
- Region: East
- Country: England
- Sovereign state: United Kingdom

Fuller Street is a hamlet in the civil parish of Fairstead and the Braintree District of Essex, England.

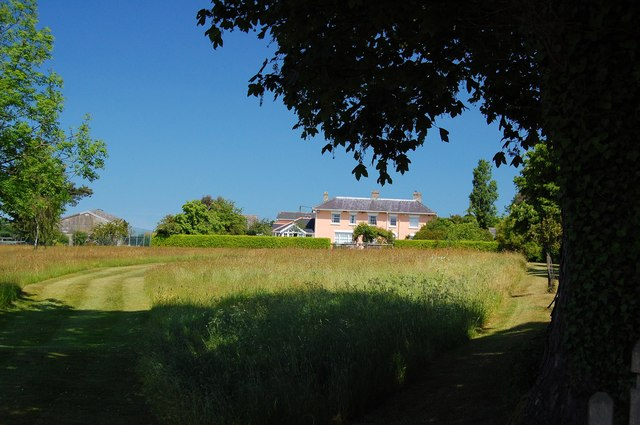
House at Fuller Street

The hamlet's public house is the Square and Compasses. There are two timber framed and plastered Grade II listed houses in Fuller Street: The Herons dating to the 17th century, and The Stores to c.1590.
