= Doe Triple-D =

Tractor produced by Ernest Doe & Sons

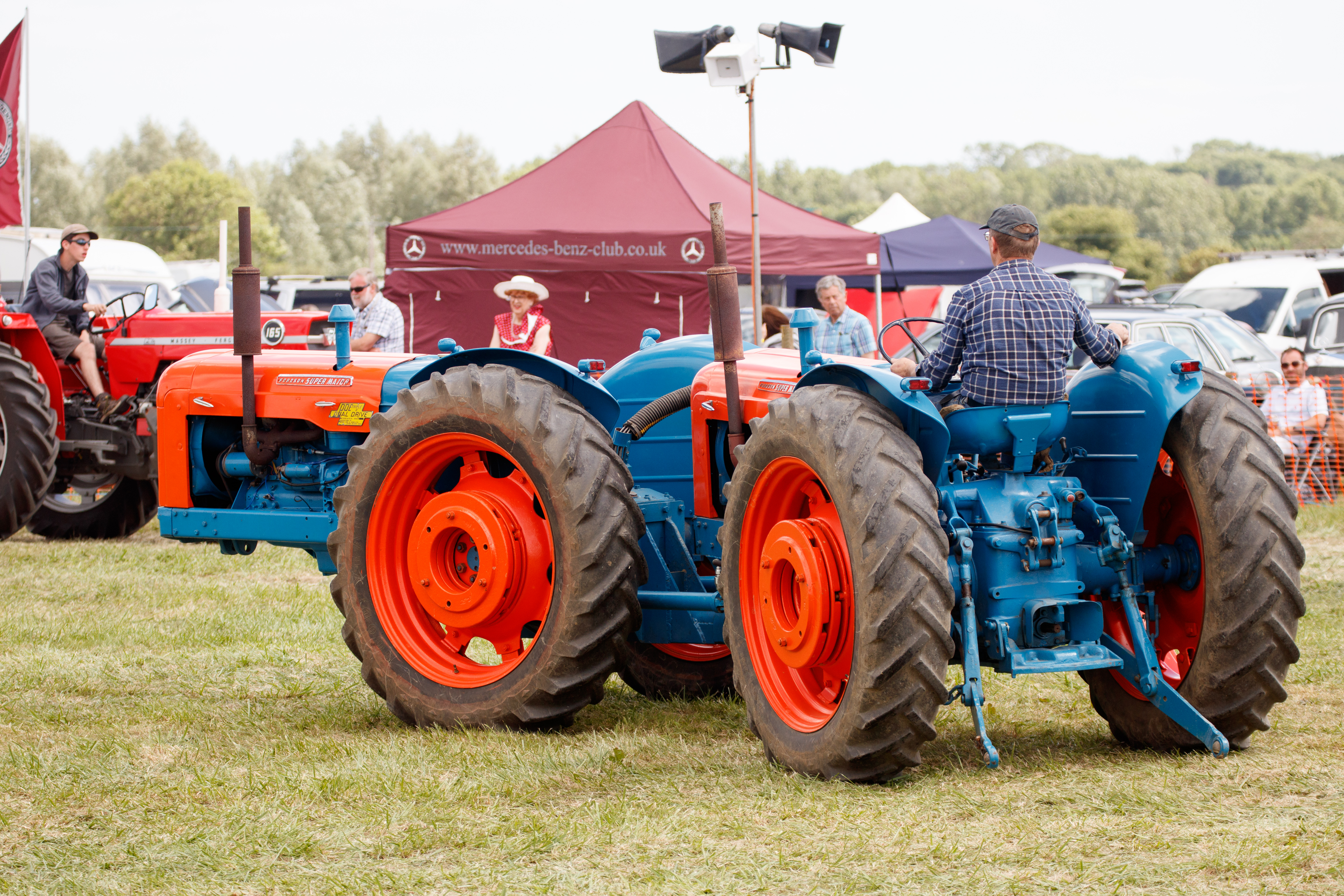
Doe Dual-Drive Triple D Tractor

The Doe Triple-D or Doe Dual Drive is a make of tractor produced by Ernest Doe & Sons in the 1950s and 1960s in Ulting Essex. Its two engines and 90-degree articulation made it one of the most unorthodox tractors ever built.

== Development ==
During the 1950s farmers in the United Kingdom in need of high-power tractors had few options. Essex farmer George Pryor developed an ingenious solution to the problem by creating his own tractor. He did this by purchasing two Fordson tractors, removing the front wheels and axles and linking the two by means of a turntable which provided the steering action powered by hydraulic rams. This left him with a double-engined four-wheel—drive tractor capable of producing more power and outperforming any of the conventional tractors on the UK market at the time.

== Commercial production ==
Local Fordson dealers Ernest Doe & Sons agreed to build an improved version, the first one was completed in 1958 and called the Doe Dual Power, later changed to Doe Dual Drive and abbreviated to Triple-D.

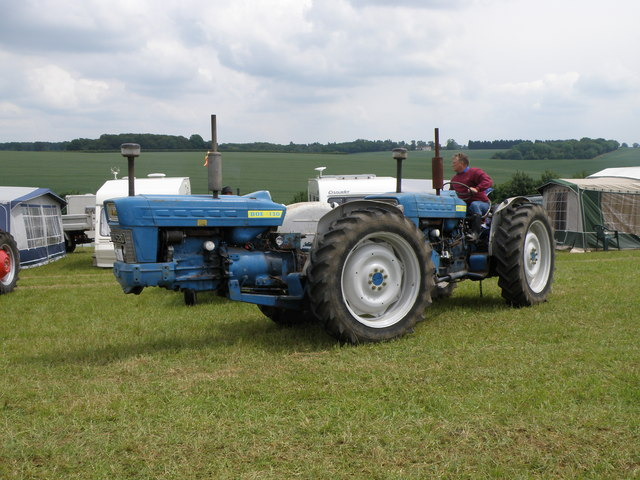
Doe Dual Drive 130 on show at the Codicote Steam and Country Show 2009

The first Doe Triple-D used two Fordson Power Major units producing 100 hp (70 kW), the later Triple-D 130 used two Ford 5000 tractors increasing the power output to over 130 hp (97 kW) and the Triple-D 150 was based on Ford Force 5000 tractors producing 150 hp (112 kW).

The vast majority of Triple-Ds were sold in the UK, but a number were exported to the United States and elsewhere.

== Disadvantages ==
The main disadvantage with the Triple-D was the lack of suitable implements for such a powerful tractor, this meant that Ernest Doe & Sons also had to develop and build a range of implements to sell with the tractors.

Other disadvantages stemmed from the use of two engines, this made controlling the tractor more difficult because of the need for two gearboxes. There were two engines and gearboxes to maintain and repair and the probability of breakdowns was increased.

== End of production ==
By the late 1960s several companies had developed single-engined tractors capable of producing over 100 hp (70 kW), this competition and the need for Doe to develop and test a approved safety rollover cab put the Doe out of production after over 300 had been built.

== Legacy ==
The Triple-D often makes appearances at agricultural fairs such as the Epworth Festival of the Plough in Epworth, Lincolnshire and LeSueur, Minnesota Pioneer Power Days show where it is always a crowd favourite, popular due to its unorthodox build.

Triple-Ds are worth a great deal due to their relative rarity, even unrestored Does can demand extremely high prices at auction.

The Triple-D is also available in a 1:16 Scale model produced by Universal Hobbies
