= Wickham Bishops =

Village in Essex, England

Coordinates: 51.7763°N 0.6681°E

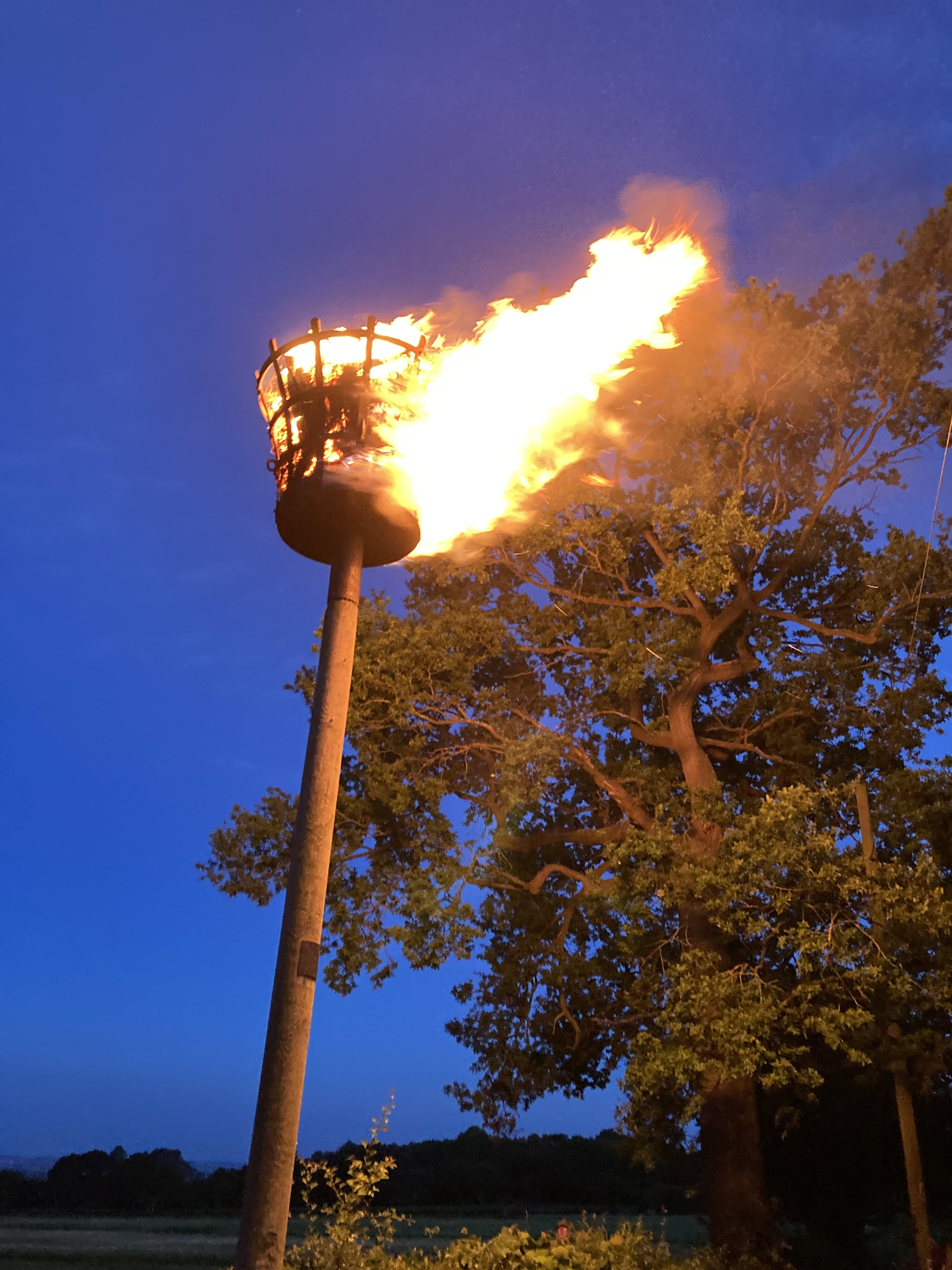
- Beacon Hill lighting ceremony during Elizabeth II's Platinum Jubilee

- Location within Essex
- Population: 1,910 (Parish, 2021) (Note: To get individual parish data, use the query function on table PP002.)
- OS grid reference: TL840120
- Civil parish: Wickham Bishops
- District: Maldon
- Shire county: Essex
- Region: East
- Country: England
- Sovereign state: United Kingdom
- Post town: WITHAM
- Postcode district: CM8
- Dialling code: 01621
- Police: Essex
- Fire: Essex
- Ambulance: East of England
- UK Parliament: Witham

Wickham Bishops is a village and civil parish in the Maldon district of Essex, England. It is located around 3 miles (4.8 km) north of the town of Maldon and 2 miles (3.2 km) south-east of Witham. At the 2021 census, the parish had a population of 1,910.

== Toponymy ==
The place name Wickham Bishops is first attested in the Domesday Book of 1086, where it appears as Wicham, meaning 'dwelling place with a (dairy) farm'. Bishops refers to the fact that the land belonged to the Bishop of London. Other references note the historic name of Wycham Episcopi.

== Churches ==
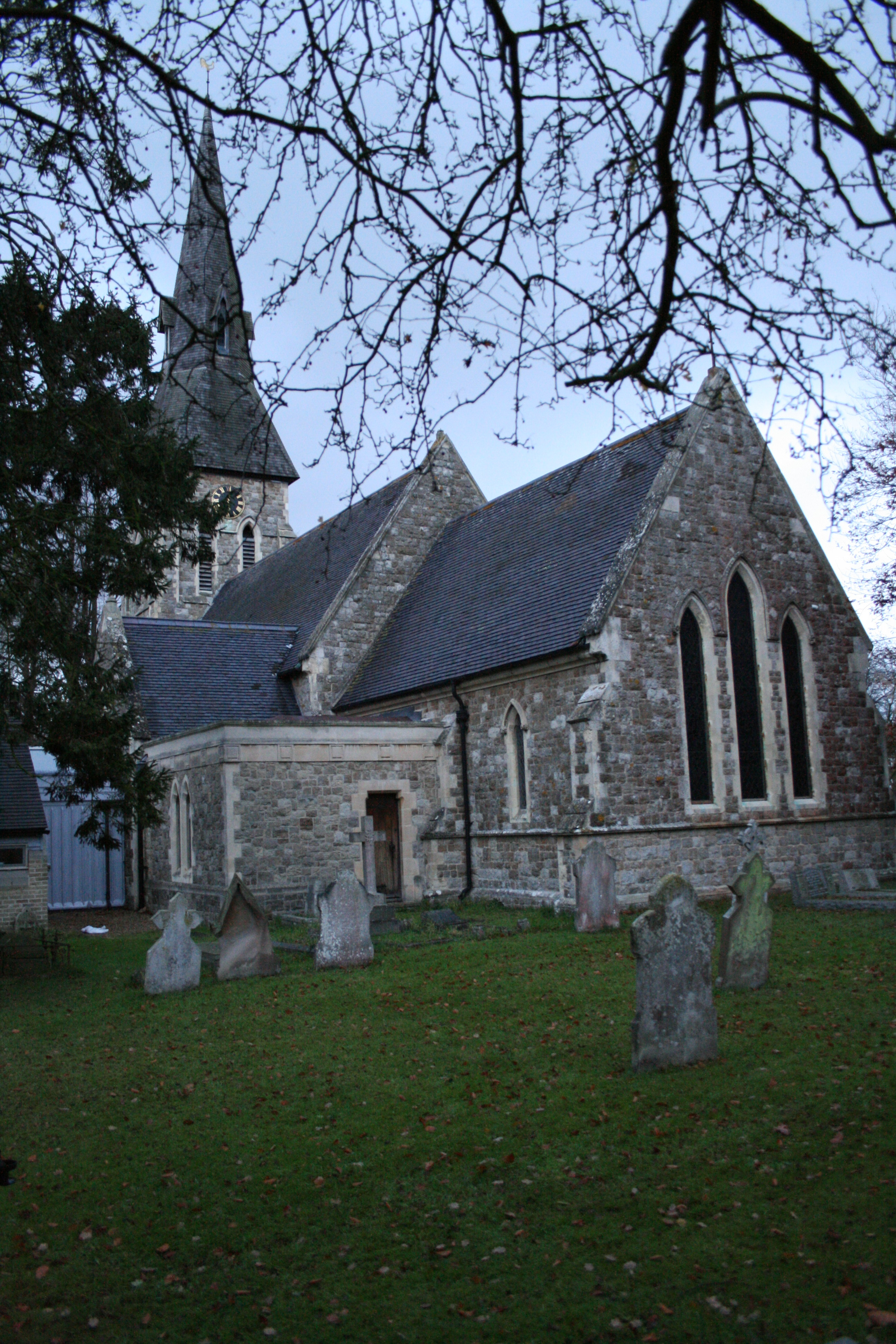
St Bartholomew's Church

The Church of England parish church is St Bartholomew's. The church was built on the western side of the hill on which the village stands. The clock on its steeple was converted to an electronic mechanism in June 2008; it was previously wound by hand. St Bartholomew's is a Victorian replacement for the medieval St Peter's Church, which stands alone in the fields to the west near the river Blackwater and beyond the disused railway line to Maldon.

The redundant Church of St Peter was probably built as a private chapel for the bishops of London who then owned the village. Since 1975, it has belonged to the Friends of Friendless Churches.

== Amenities and organisations ==
Wickham Bishops has a village hall (reconstructed in 2005), playing fields, a library, tennis courts, a hairdresser, health food shop, estate agent and a One Stop local shop/off licence. There were formerly two pubs in the village: the Mitre has closed and turned into a Mrs Salisbury's and the Chequers is now a pub/restaurant, The Bear.

There is a small library, which is located in the old school building in School Road.

Wickham Bishops Drama Club first performed in 1928 with a production of HMS Pinafore. Since then, the club continues to perform various productions throughout the year featuring both their adult and junior groups. It produces four shows annually: the pantomime, the summer production, a spring play and an entry for the Gimson One Act Play Festival.

Witham South District of GirlGuiding UK covers the area, formed of two Rainbow packs for girls aged 5–7 years old and a Brownie pack for girls aged 7–10. The 1st Beacon Hill group forms part of Maldon and East Essex Scouts, which comprises Beaver, Cub and Scout troops for boys and girls.

== Transport ==
The B1018 runs through Wickham Bishops and the village's nearest major road is the A12, which links east London, Chelmsford, Colchester, Ipswich and Lowestoft.

Wickham Bishops railway station served the village on the Witham–Maldon branch line, between 1848 and 1964. The nearest station is now Witham on the Great Eastern Main Line.

Stephensons of Essex operates the 90 bus route between Maldon and Witham generally every half an hour on weekdays.

== Notable people ==
- Former England men's cricket team captain Sir Alastair Cook lived in Wickham Bishops as a boy.
- Composer Nicola LeFanu was born in Wickham Bishops.
