= White Notley railway station =

Railway station in Essex, England

Coordinates: 51.839°N 0.596°E

White Notley
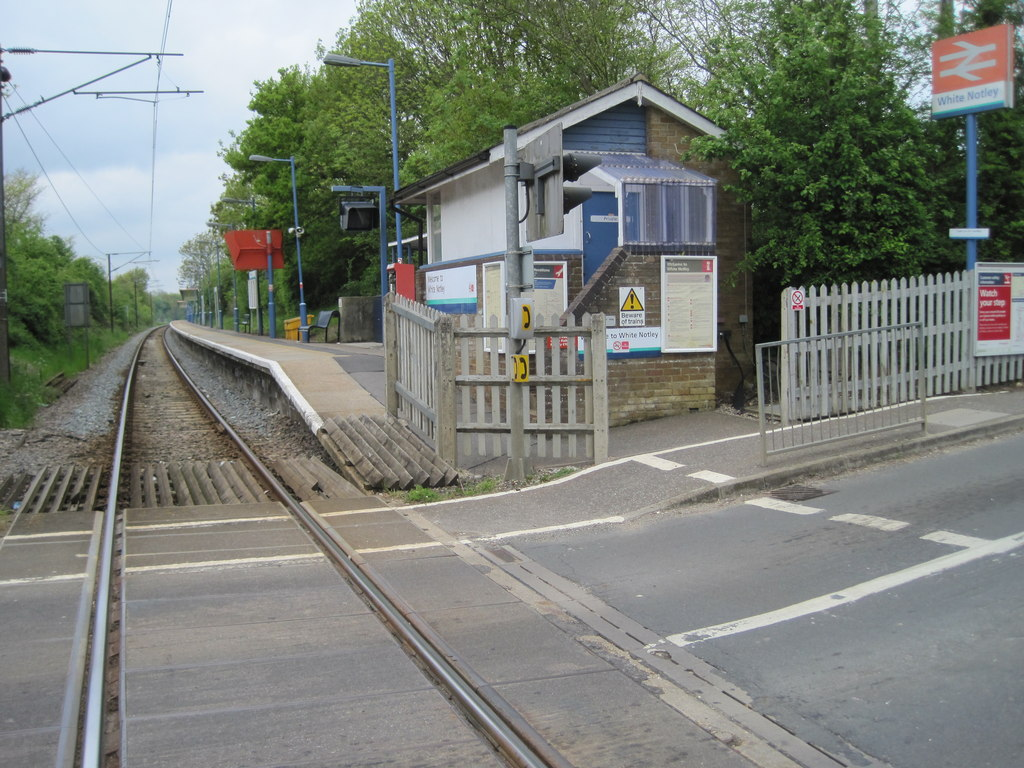
- White Notley railway station in 2013

General information
- Location: White Notley, Braintree; England
- Grid reference: TL789187
- Manager: Greater Anglia
- Platforms: 1

Other information
- Station code: WNY
- Classification: DfT category F2

Key dates
- 2 October 1848: Opened

Passengers
- 2021/22: ▲7,408
- 2022/23: ▲8,128
- 2023/24: ▼6,990
- 2024/25: ▲7,660
- 2025/26: ▲9,194
Location
Notes
- Passenger statistics from the Office of Rail and Road

White Notley railway station is on the Braintree Branch Line in the East of England, serving the village of White Notley, Essex. It is 41 miles 60 chains (67.19 km) down the line from London Liverpool Street and it is situated between Witham to the south and Cressing to the north. Its three-letter station code is WNY. The platform has an operational length for twelve-coach trains. In 2025/26, it was the least used station in Essex.

The station is currently managed by Greater Anglia, which also operates all trains serving it.

White Notley railway station featured in Geoff Marshall's YouTube series of Least Used Stations where his special guest was Andy Carter who also has his own YouTube channel called Calling All Stations.

== Services ==
All services at White Notley are operated by Greater Anglia using Class 720 EMUs.

The typical off-peak service is one train per hour in each direction between Braintree and London Liverpool Street via Witham with additional services calling at the station during the peak hours.

On Sundays, southbound services at the station run only as far as Witham.

Preceding station	National Rail	Following station
Witham	Greater Anglia Braintree Branch Line	Cressing
