= Braintree railway station (England) =

Railway station in Essex, England

Braintree
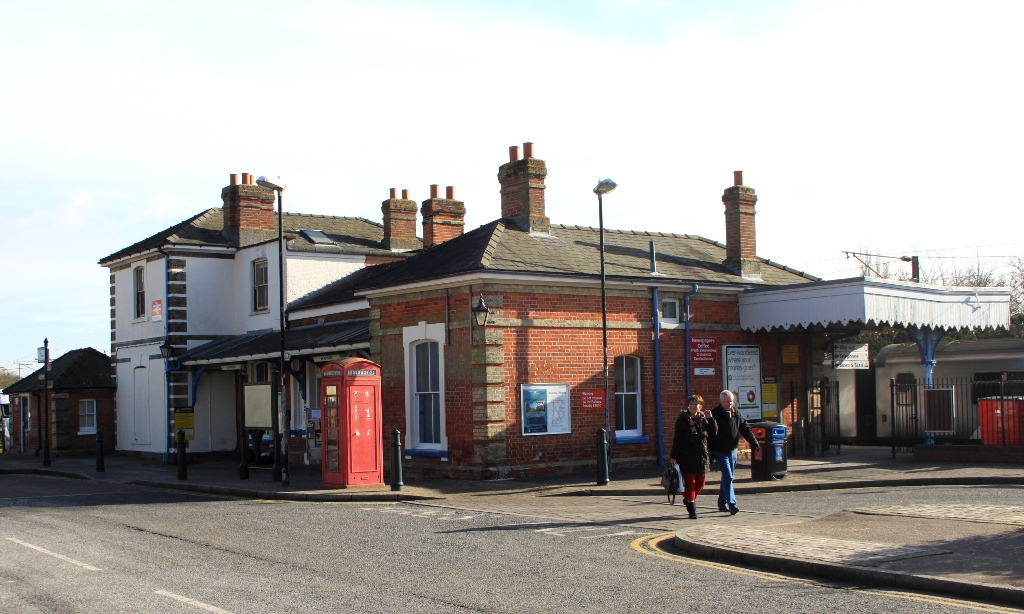
- Station entrance as seen in February 2013

General information
- Location: Braintree, Braintree; England
- Coordinates: 51°52′31″N 0°33′25″E
- Grid reference: TL760227
- Manager: Greater Anglia
- Platforms: 1

Other information
- Station code: BTR
- Classification: DfT category C2

History
- Original company: Eastern Counties Railway
- Pre-grouping: Great Eastern Railway
- Post-grouping: London and North Eastern Railway

Key dates
- 2 October 1848: Opened as Braintree
- 22 February 1869: Re-sited
- 19 October 1910: Renamed Braintree & Bocking
- After 1948: Renamed Braintree

Passengers
- 2020/21: ▼0.175 million
- 2021/22: ▲0.460 million
- 2022/23: ▲0.525 million
- 2023/24: ▲0.575 million
- 2024/25: ▲0.631 million
Location
Notes
- Passenger statistics from the Office of Rail and Road

Braintree railway station is the northern terminus of the Braintree Branch Line in the East of England, serving the town of Braintree, Essex. It is 44 miles 78 chains (72.38 km) down the line from London Liverpool Street via Witham; the preceding station on the route is Braintree Freeport to the south.

Its three-letter station code is BTR. The platform has an operational length for twelve-coach trains. The station is currently managed by Greater Anglia, which also operates all trains serving it.

== History ==
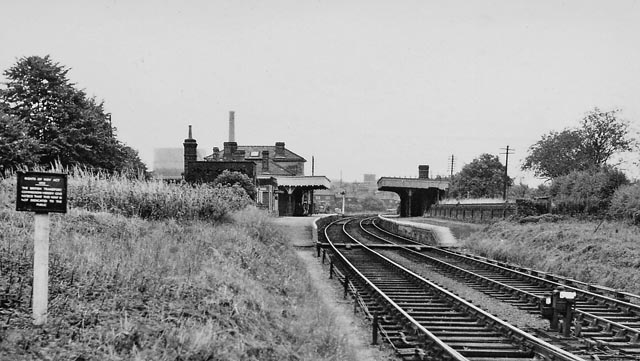
Braintree railway station in 1962

There have been two stations at Braintree. The first, which was the northern terminus of the Maldon, Witham & Braintree Railway, opened on 2 October 1848. That station was closed to passengers with the opening of the Bishop's Stortford, Dunmow & Braintree Railway on 22 February 1869, when the old terminus was replaced by a through-station on the new line. It continued as a goods depot until 1964. The new station was named Braintree & Bocking on 19 October 1910, but reverted to its original name of Braintree between 1948 and 1953. The station once featured in many model railway sets as "Braintree & Bocking" was the printed station name in the Airfix railway accessories. Passenger services on the route between Braintree and Bishop's Stortford ceased on 3 March 1952.

A 15 miles (24 km) cycle and walking track, the Flitch Way, was created in 1994 on the extension branch line to Bishop's Stortford beyond Braintree railway station to the outskirts of Bishop's Stortford.

== Services ==
All services at Braintree are operated by Greater Anglia using Class 720 EMUs.

The typical off-peak service is one train per hour to and from London Liverpool Street via Witham with additional services running to and from station during the peak hours.

On Sundays, services at the station run only as far as Witham.

Preceding station	National Rail	Following station
Braintree Freeport	Greater Anglia Braintree Branch Line	Terminus
	Disused railways	
Terminus	Great Eastern Railway Bishop's Stortford to Braintree Branch Line	Rayne
