= Maldon West railway station =

Former railway station in England

Coordinates: 51.7262°N 0.6659°E

Maldon West

General information
- Location: Maldon, Maldon; England
- Platforms: 2

Other information
- Status: Disused

History
- Original company: Great Eastern Railway
- Pre-grouping: Great Eastern Railway
- Post-grouping: London and North Eastern Railway

Key dates
- 1 October 1889: Opened as Maldon West
- 22 May 1916: Closed
- 1 August 1919: Reopened as Maldon West Halt
- 10 September 1939: Permanently closed
Location

Maldon West railway station served the town of Maldon, Essex. It was opened on 1 October 1889 by the Great Eastern Railway on a branch line from Woodham Ferrers to Maldon. It was closed in 1916 during World War I but reopened as a halt in 1919. The Engineer's Line Reference for the line is WFM, the station was 7 miles 16 chains (11.59 km) from Wickford Junction.

The station was permanently closed to passenger services in September 1939 but the line remained in use for goods traffic until 1959. Until the late 1980s the north and south portals of the tunnel could be seen and platforms survived however the entire site is now under the A414/Maldon Bypass.

Preceding station	Disused railways	Following station
Maldon East and Heybridge	Great Eastern Railway; Maldon to Woodham Ferrers branch line	Barons Lane Halt
