= White Notley =

Village and civil parish in Essex, England

Coordinates: 51°50′N 0°35′E

- Village
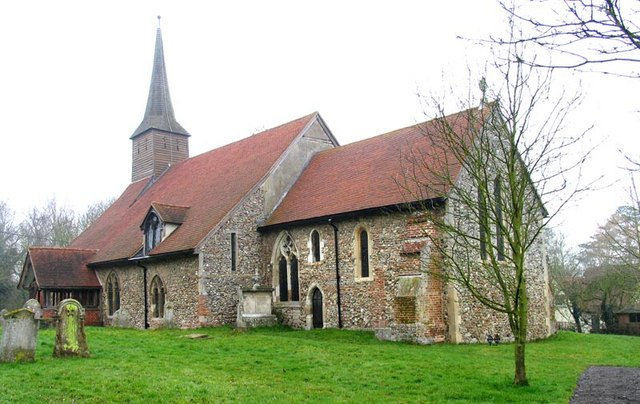
- St Etheldreda's Church
- Population: 532 (Parish, 2021)
- District: Braintree
- Shire county: Essex
- Region: East
- Country: England
- Sovereign state: United Kingdom
- Post town: WITHAM
- Postcode district: CM8
- Police: Essex
- Fire: Essex
- Ambulance: East of England
- UK Parliament: Witham

White Notley is a village and civil parish in Essex, England. The settlement (which includes the outlying hamlet of The Green) lies equidistant between the towns of Witham and Braintree amongst arable farmland, 4 miles (6.4 km) in each direction. White Notley is a quintessentially English village with a small primary school, public house, railway station, post office, village hall and a 10th-century church. At the 2021 census the parish had a population of 532.

White Notley railway station is on the Braintree Branch Line. The parish forms part of the Witham constituency.

== History ==
Remains from a settlement dating to the Bronze Age have been found in the centre of the village, including pottery and tools. Extensive remains from the Roman age have been found, including a Roman villa and tombs, yielding artifacts such as pottery, glassware and remains of buildings. On the same site fragments of pottery typical of that manufactured by the Ancient Britons have also been found. When the bridge over the River Brain was rebuilt in the 20th century, Roman horseshoes and a harness were discovered.

White Notley and the larger neighbouring village of Black Notley (located 3 miles (5 km) to the north-west) formerly constituted one township – Notley. The name is supposed to have been derived from the Old English (Anglo-Saxon) "knut" and "ley" (meaning "nut pasture") and is mentioned in the Domesday Book (1086 A.D.) as Nutle[i]a. The hazel trees for which the Anglo-Saxon settlement was named still proliferate around the village and in the hedgerows of the surrounding fields. It is close to the location of the former Knights Templar Preceptory of Cressing Temple.

The religious centre of the village is St. Etheldreda's church, built on the site of the earlier Roman temple, on what is now named Church Hill, opposite the 16th-century White Notley Hall and adjacent to the 17th-century Vicarage (Old Vicarage since 1987). The church is principally of 10th-century construction, with much Roman brick and stonework in its fabric, from the villa and the earlier temple. The niches on either side of the nave arch are thought to be a survival from the temple itself. Of note is a small mediaeval stained glass window in the vestry, which depicts St. Etheldreda, and is set in a stone frame reused from an Anglo-Saxon grave marker.

== Football club ==
The local football club, White Notley F.C., was formed on 12 May 1950, and joined the Essex Intermediate League Division Two in 1988. In the 2001-02 season the club finished second, and was promoted to Division One. After finishing 11th out of 12 teams in the 2003-04 season, the club was relegated to Division Two, but was promoted the following season after winning the Division Two championship. In the 2006-07 season they were members of the Essex Olympian Football League Division One, finishing in third place, but then transferred to the Essex and Suffolk Border Football League.
