= Maldon East and Heybridge railway station =

Former railway station in England

Coordinates: 51.7353°N 0.6825°E

Maldon East and Heybridge
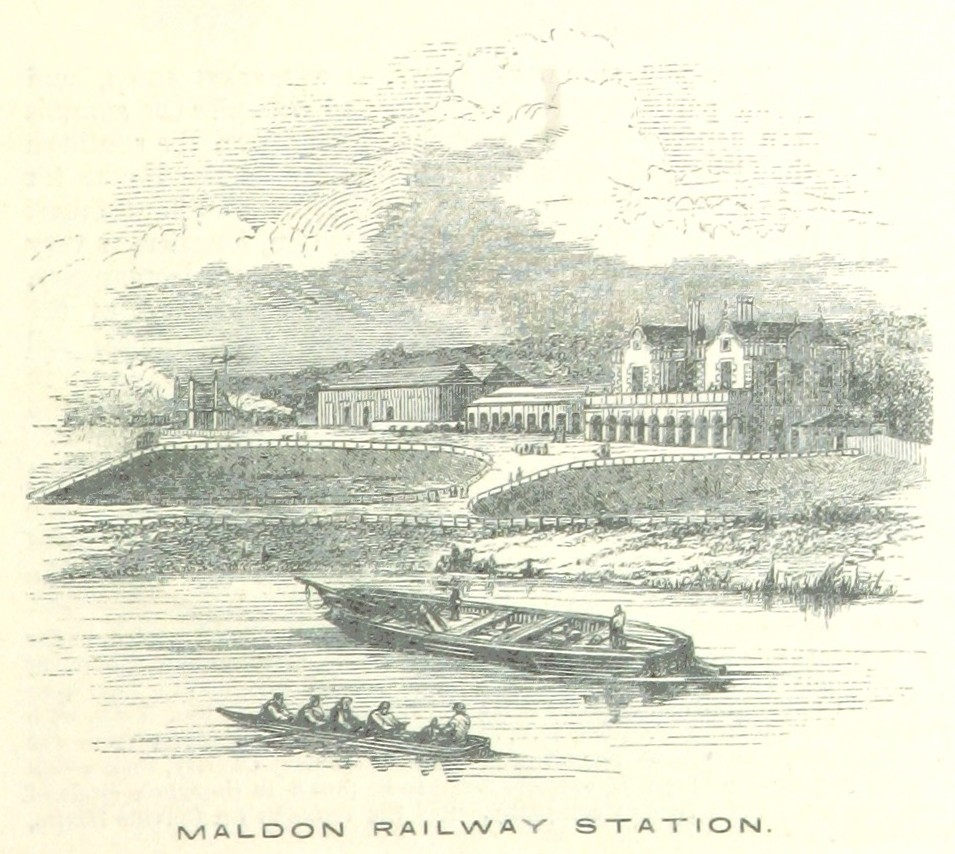

General information
- Location: Maldon and Heybridge, Maldon, England
- Platforms: 2

Other information
- Status: Disused

History
- Original company: Eastern Counties Railway; Maldon, Witham & Braintree Railway
- Pre-grouping: Great Eastern Railway
- Post-grouping: London and North Eastern Railway; Eastern Region of British Railways

Key dates
- 2 October 1848: Opened as Maldon
- 1 October 1889: Renamed Maldon East
- 1 Oct 1907: Renamed Maldon East and Heybridge
- 7 September 1964: Closed for passengers
- 1966: closed completely
Location

Maldon East and Heybridge railway station served the town of Maldon and village of Heybridge in Essex, England. It was opened in 1848 by the Maldon, Witham & Braintree Railway (MWBR) on a branch line from Witham to Maldon. It was originally named Maldon but was renamed Maldon East in 1889 and then Maldon East and Heybridge in 1907.

It was a terminus station located at the end of two branch lines from Witham and Woodham Ferrers. A plan dated 1920 shows that the station had a goods shed and a two-road engine shed. A turntable was situated adjacent to the station building and there were sidings that served the Blackwater Canal and the river wharf.

The line and the station closed to passenger services in 1964 as part of the Beeching closures.

== Description ==
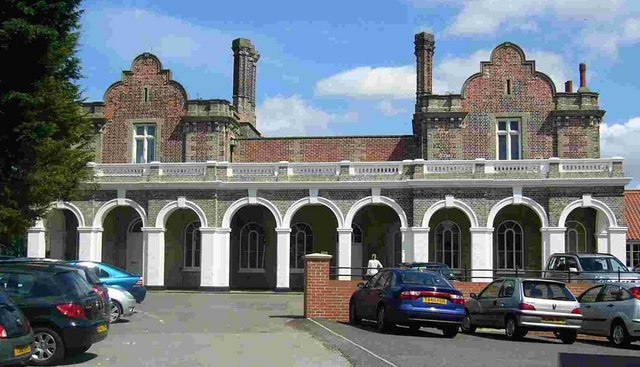
The Maldon East railway station building

The station building at Maldon is an impressive example of Victorian railway architecture, although built in an unnecessarily extravagant style. In 1847, David Waddington was seeking re-election to the Maldon parliamentary constituency and was a vice-chair of the Eastern Counties Railway. Paye suggests that he appears to have enhanced the specification of the building in order to encourage employment locally, but Gairns provides a more prosaic reason, that of appealing to civic pride among the middle classes.

The station building was built in the Jacobean style, with a large booking hall, waiting rooms and ticket office on the ground floor. The upper floor contained the station master's apartments, which were reached by a winding staircase from the booking hall. Originally, the single platform was partly covered by a glass roof but this was removed after an explosion of an engine boiler caused significant damage.

A second bay platform was added in 1889.

== History ==
The branch from Witham was part of a scheme to link Braintree with its traditional port at Maldon. The scheme started in 1845, as a direct link from Braintree rather than the two branches that were actually built. It soon ran into financial trouble and was taken over by the Eastern Counties Railway keen to ensure there was no competition for its own interests.

Construction started in March 1847 and the first goods trains ran in August 1848, followed by the opening to passenger trains on 2 October of the same year.

In 1862, the Eastern Counties Railway was taken over by the Great Eastern Railway (GER).

The station was originally named Maldon but, after the opening of the Maldon West line on 1 October 1889, the station was renamed Maldon East. The 50 foot diameter turntable, manufactured by Ransomes & Rapier of Ipswich, was installed at this time and a second platform was added to the west of the station building.

In 1907, the station was further renamed to Maldon East and Heybridge; its actual position is below the hill on which the town of Maldon stands and on the road to the village of Heybridge, which has long since been subsumed as a suburb.

At the beginning of 1923, operation of the station became part of the London & North Eastern Railway as a result of the Railway grouping.

In 1939, traffic was withdrawn from the Woodham Ferrers line as a wartime economy measure. The branch saw heavy usage in World War 2 with additional freight traffic.

Following nationalisation of the railways in 1948, the station became part of British Railways Eastern Region. In 1953, the Woodham Ferrers branch was closed; it had been operating one goods service per weekday for many years. However, between 31 January 1957 and 31 January 1959, the line did re-open for freight as far as Maldon West, with trains reversing at Maldon East and Heybridge station.

In 1958, railbuses started operating the line to Witham with an improved schedule and, in 1959, more frequent services were introduced. It was, however, too late as the rise of road transport and cheaper competing bus services saw the Witham branch carrying just 400 passengers per day. It is thought that, by 1959, the engine shed had closed (^{precise date unknown} ) as no steam locomotives were using the branch.

The line was slated for closure in the Beeching Report and, despite the efforts of local campaigners, the last passenger train ran on 6 September 1964. Freight lingered on with gravel and fruit traffic until 15 April 1966.

== Locomotives ==
Ex Norfolk Railway 2-4-0 locomotives worked early trains on the branch.

From GER days until 1958 the passenger service was generally in the hands of a GER Class M15 (LNE class F4 2-4-2T engine hauling two GER corridor coaches (three in summer). Occasionally GER Class Y14 (LNE class J15) 0-6-0 locomotives worked passenger services as did a T26 (LNE Class E4 2-4-0) for one summer.

Other GER tank engines occasionally worked passenger services and 0-6-0T engines from the R24 (LNE class J67) and C72 (LNE class J68) classes worked goods traffic until succumbing to dieselisation.

From 1958 the station was operated by the first generation of BR Railbuses numbers E79960-E79964 which were based at Cambridge and which also worked a number of lightly used East Anglian branch lines. The Class 15 locomotives took over freight workings as weight restrictions on the timber bridges on the branch meant nothing heavier could work as far as Maldon. A member of this class operated the last goods train in April 1966.

== Maldon engine shed ==
This was a substantial two track building. Until the Maldon West branch opened in 1889 there was no turntable located at Maldon so any tender engines working the branch would have had to have worked one direction tender first. In organisational terms Maldon was a sub-shed of Colchester and any locomotives needing heavy repair were sent there.

In GER days the shed had two drivers, two acting drivers, four firemen and a boiler washer (who probably did most of the odd jobs around the shed as well).

On 1 January 1922 the shed had an allocation of four GER Class C32 2-4-2T locomotive (later LNER Class F3) and a single GER Class Y65 2-4-2T locomotive (later LNER Class F7 and nicknamed Crystal Palace tanks).

The shed closed sometime after dieselisation c 1959.

== Goods traffic ==
The sidings to the River Blackwater and Blackwater Canal provided additional traffic. As well as agricultural produce there was significant coal traffic in the early years of the railway.

== Services ==
In 1847, there were five trains per day each way to Witham. Between 1874 and 1883, there were nine but this reduced to seven a decade later. Bradshaw's Timetable Guide for 1910 shows seven trains per day, with two additional services on a Wednesday. By 1939, there were nine services per day but it was not until 1958, and the introduction of diesel multiple units, that the branch enjoyed a service of 17 trains per day.

On opening, the Woodham Ferrers branch was served by five trains per day but this struggled for traffic throughout its operating life. By 1914, there were six trains per day although this reduced during the First World War. In 1939, traffic was withdrawn from the Woodham Ferrers line, as a wartime economy measure, and never restarted.

Preceding station	Disused railways	Following station
Langford and Ulting	Great Eastern Railway; Witham-Maldon branch line	Terminus
Maldon West	Great Eastern Railway; Maldon to Woodham Ferrers	Terminus

== Since closure ==
The station building has survived and was, for many years, a restaurant. As of August 2013, it is largely surrounded by an industrial estate, although its impressive frontage can still be viewed from Station Road.

The original large goods shed stood until May 2008, when it was illegally demolished to make way for development.
