= Kelvedon railway station =

Railway station in Essex, England

Kelvedon
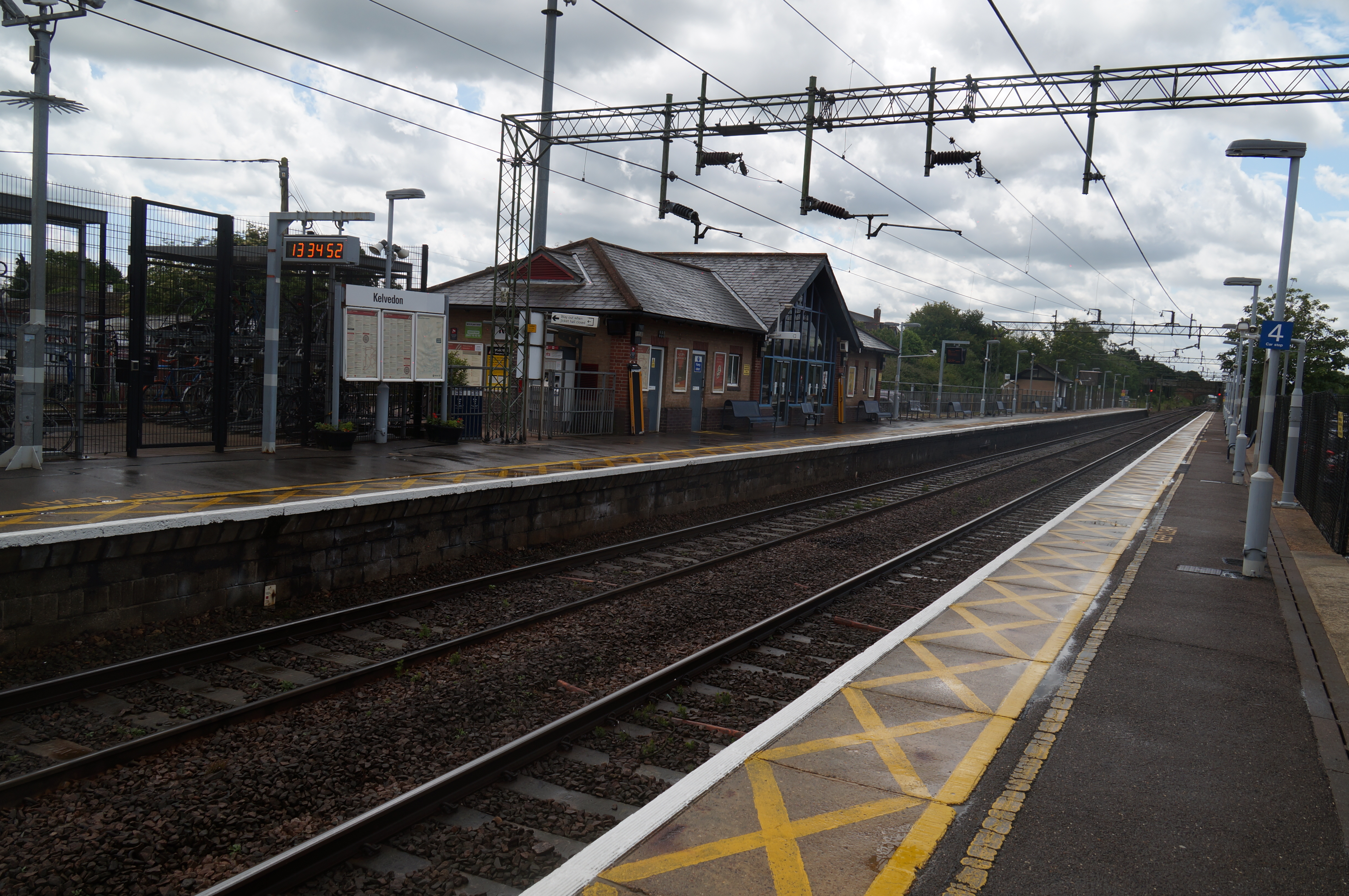

General information
- Location: Kelvedon and Feering, District of Braintree; England
- Coordinates: 51°50′27.29″N 0°42′09.85″E
- Grid reference: TL862192
- Managed by: Greater Anglia
- Platforms: 2

Other information
- Station code: KEL
- Classification: DfT category C2

History
- Original company: Eastern Counties Railway
- Pre-grouping: Great Eastern Railway
- Post-grouping: London and North Eastern Railway

Key dates
- 29 March 1843: Opened

Passengers
- 2020/21: ▼0.120 million
- 2021/22: ▲0.356 million
- 2022/23: ▲0.482 million
- 2023/24: ▲0.546 million
- 2024/25: ▲0.600 million
Location
Notes
- Passenger statistics from the Office of Rail and Road

Kelvedon railway station is on the Great Eastern Main Line (GEML) in the East of England, serving the villages of Kelvedon and Feering, Essex. It is also the closest station to the settlements of Coggeshall and Tiptree. Kelvedon is 42 miles 18 chains (68.0 km) down the line from London Liverpool Street. It is situated between Witham to the west and Marks Tey to the east. Its three-letter station code is KEL.

The station was opened in 1843 by the Eastern Counties Railway. It is currently operated by Greater Anglia, who also operate all trains serving it, as part of the East Anglia franchise.

To the north-east was a separate station called Kelvedon Low Level, which until 1951 was the terminus of the now disused Kelvedon and Tollesbury Light Railway.

== History ==
The section of the Eastern Counties Railway between Brentwood and Colchester was opened on 29 March 1843, and one of the original stations on that section was Kelvedon.

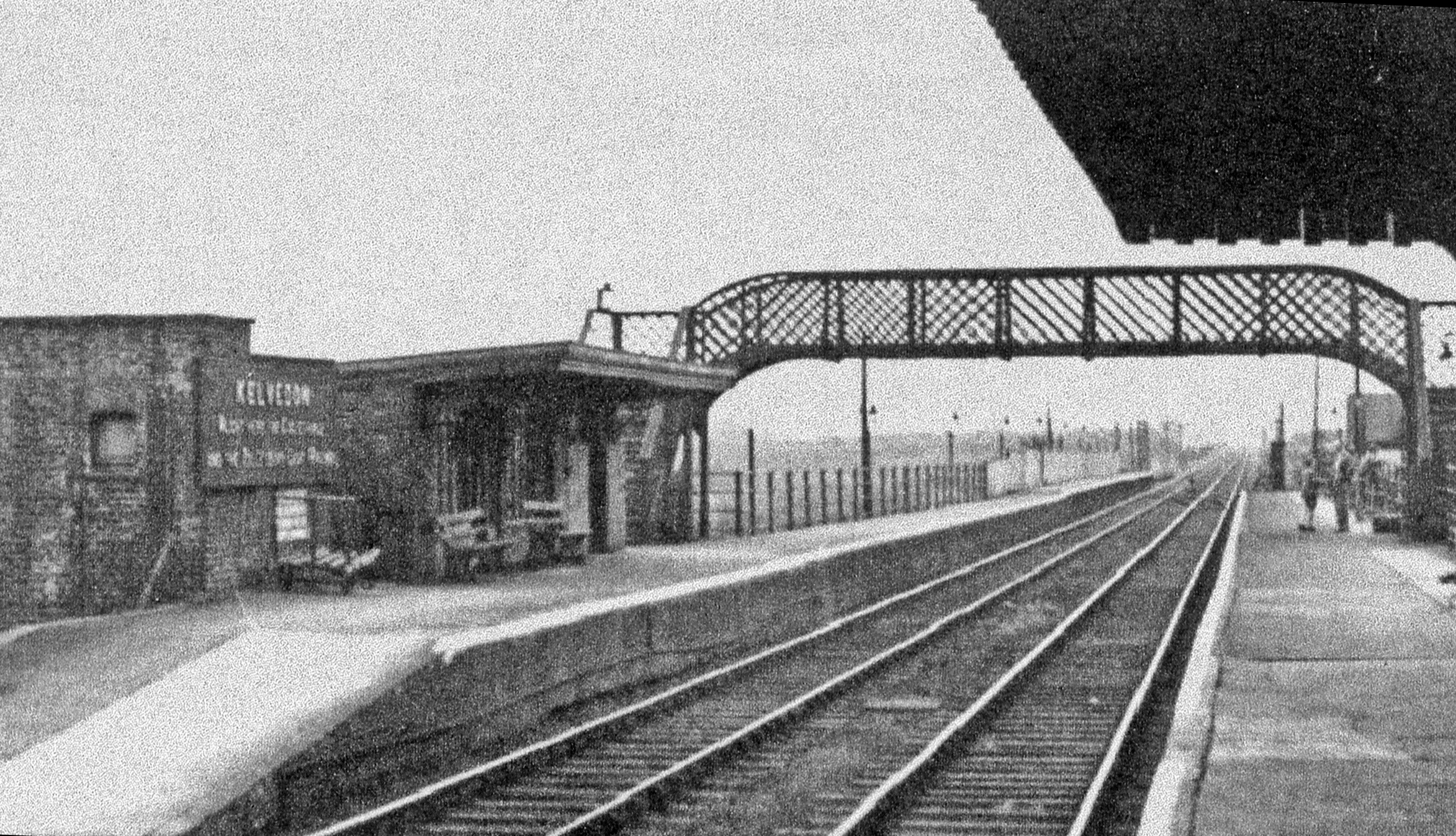
Kelvedon (High Level) station, 1950.

In common with most rural stations, Kelvedon handled local goods and a 1923 plan shows sidings with cattle pens on the up-side at the London end, and sidings with a goods shed on the down-side at the London end of the station. There was also a large warehouse which was used by King Seeds for many years on the down-side. The goods yard closed on 7 December 1964.

There was a link line to Kelvedon Low Level railway station with a drop of 1 in 50, which joined the main line at the country end of the up line.

The station complex was controlled by a signal box at the London end of the up platform which closed on 3 December 1961 when Witham power box became responsible for the section through to Marks Tey.

== Accidents and incidents ==
- On 17 October 1872, one passenger was killed and 16 people were injured in a derailment at Kelvedon. The 09:45 express service from Yarmouth to Bishopsgate left the tracks as it approached Kelvedon at a speed of up to 40 mph. A Board of Trade investigation blamed a suspension defect through lack of maintenance.
- On 4 October 2005, a team of track maintenance staff was working by a set of points at Kelvedon when the 13:30 passenger train from Norwich to Liverpool Street passed through the station. The team had taken refuge in a place of safety as the train passed, but one of them was injured by a steel threaded plug which flew off the moving locomotive, which was travelling at speed. The worker suffered a fracture to his skull and injury to his hand.

== Services ==
The following services typically call at Kelvedon:

Operator	Route	Rolling stock	Frequency	Notes
Greater Anglia	London Liverpool Street - Stratford - Shenfield - Chelmsford - Beaulieu Park - Hatfield Peverel - Witham - Kelvedon - Marks Tey - Colchester - Manningtree - Ipswich	Class 720	1x per hour in each direction	Also calls at Ingatestone on Sundays
Greater Anglia	London Liverpool Street - Stratford - Shenfield - Chelmsford - Beaulieu Park - Witham - Kelvedon - Marks Tey - Colchester - Colchester Town	Class 720	1x per hour in each direction	Not Sundays

Preceding station	National Rail	Following station
Witham	Greater Anglia Great Eastern Main Line	Marks Tey
