= Project Oval =

British rail fare collection scheme

Project Oval is a project led by the Department of Transport to expand contactless pay as you go ticketing to National Rail stations in the East and South East of England.

== History ==
=== The Oyster Era (2004–2014) ===
Pay As You Go (PAYG) ticketing debuted in January 2004 with the rollout of the Oyster card. Providing a faster, more convenient alternative to traditional paper tickets, Oyster quickly captured the majority of the fare payment market as its validity expanded across the network.

=== The Rise of Contactless (2014–2019) ===
On 16 September 2014, contactless payment was introduced as an alternative to Oyster, offering the same fares and functionality.Contactless quickly began displacing Oyster in market share. This shift accelerated the decline of cash and paper tickets, eventually leading to the complete withdrawal of cash fares on London buses and trams. As the system grew, communities just outside the boundary increasingly campaigned for their local stations to be included within the system.

=== Reaching the Oyster Limit (2019) ===
The aging Oyster system has a hard technical limit of 15 zones. Because of this, expansions after August 2019 became contactless-only.

- The Final Oyster Expansion: Potters Bar and Radlett on 29 August 2019 marked the final stations added to the Oyster network.
- The First Contactless-Only Station: Brookmans Park launched on that same day, accepting only contactless cards, not Oyster.

Subsequent contactless-only expansions pushed well beyond the old Oyster boundaries, extending to Reading (including intermediate Thames Valley branches), Luton Airport Parkway, and Welwyn Garden City.

=== South East Expansion ===
Following a 2019 consultation, the Department for Transport (DfT) commissioned a massive expansion to bring contactless PAYG to roughly 233 stations across the South East of England. Transport for London (TfL) was awarded the £68.1 million contract to integrate this expanded network with London's existing contactless system..

== Phase 1 ==
On 4 July 2023, DfT announced that Phase 1 of Project Oval would encompass 53 stations across various lines, with contactless ticketing expected to be active by the end of 2023. As of 2 February 2025, 47 of these stations have begun accepting contactless payments:

Train Operating Company / Companies	Route	Stations
Southeastern and Thameslink	Swanley and Knockholt to Sevenoaks	Eynsford
Southeastern and Thameslink	Swanley and Knockholt to Sevenoaks	Shoreham
Southeastern and Thameslink	Swanley and Knockholt to Sevenoaks	Otford
Southeastern and Thameslink	Swanley and Knockholt to Sevenoaks	Bat & Ball
Southeastern and Thameslink	Swanley and Knockholt to Sevenoaks	Dunton Green
Southeastern and Thameslink	Swanley and Knockholt to Sevenoaks	Sevenoaks
South Western Railway	Hampton to Shepperton	Kempton Park
South Western Railway	Hampton to Shepperton	Sunbury
South Western Railway	Hampton to Shepperton	Upper Halliford
South Western Railway	Hampton to Shepperton	Shepperton
South Western Railway	Feltham to Virginia Water and Windsor & Eton Riverside	Ashford
South Western Railway	Feltham to Virginia Water and Windsor & Eton Riverside	Staines
South Western Railway	Feltham to Virginia Water and Windsor & Eton Riverside	Egham
South Western Railway	Feltham to Virginia Water and Windsor & Eton Riverside	Virginia Water
South Western Railway	Feltham to Virginia Water and Windsor & Eton Riverside	Wraysbury
South Western Railway	Feltham to Virginia Water and Windsor & Eton Riverside	Sunnymeads
South Western Railway	Feltham to Virginia Water and Windsor & Eton Riverside	Datchet
South Western Railway	Feltham to Virginia Water and Windsor & Eton Riverside	Windsor & Eton Riverside
Chiltern Railways	West Ruislip to High Wycombe	Denham
Chiltern Railways	West Ruislip to High Wycombe	Denham Golf Club
Chiltern Railways	West Ruislip to High Wycombe	Gerrards Cross
Chiltern Railways	West Ruislip to High Wycombe	Seer Green & Jordans
Chiltern Railways	West Ruislip to High Wycombe	Beaconsfield
Chiltern Railways	West Ruislip to High Wycombe	High Wycombe
London Northwestern Railway	Watford Junction to Bletchley	Kings Langley
London Northwestern Railway	Watford Junction to Bletchley	Apsley
London Northwestern Railway	Watford Junction to Bletchley	Hemel Hempstead
London Northwestern Railway	Watford Junction to Bletchley	Berkhamsted
London Northwestern Railway	Watford Junction to Bletchley	Tring
London Northwestern Railway	Watford Junction to Bletchley	Cheddington
London Northwestern Railway	Watford Junction to Bletchley	Leighton Buzzard
London Northwestern Railway	Watford Junction to Bletchley	Bletchley
London Northwestern Railway	Watford Junction to St Albans Abbey	Watford North
London Northwestern Railway	Watford Junction to St Albans Abbey	Garston
London Northwestern Railway	Watford Junction to St Albans Abbey	Bricket Wood
London Northwestern Railway	Watford Junction to St Albans Abbey	How Wood
London Northwestern Railway	Watford Junction to St Albans Abbey	Park Street
London Northwestern Railway	Watford Junction to St Albans Abbey	St Albans Abbey
c2c	The remainder of the network beyond Upminster and Grays	Tilbury Town
c2c	The remainder of the network beyond Upminster and Grays	East Tilbury
c2c	The remainder of the network beyond Upminster and Grays	Stanford-le-Hope
c2c	The remainder of the network beyond Upminster and Grays	West Horndon
c2c	The remainder of the network beyond Upminster and Grays	Laindon
c2c	The remainder of the network beyond Upminster and Grays	Basildon
c2c	The remainder of the network beyond Upminster and Grays	Pitsea
c2c	The remainder of the network beyond Upminster and Grays	Benfleet
c2c	The remainder of the network beyond Upminster and Grays	Leigh-on-Sea
c2c	The remainder of the network beyond Upminster and Grays	Chalkwell
c2c	The remainder of the network beyond Upminster and Grays	Westcliff
c2c	The remainder of the network beyond Upminster and Grays	Southend Central
c2c	The remainder of the network beyond Upminster and Grays	Southend East
c2c	The remainder of the network beyond Upminster and Grays	Thorpe Bay
c2c	The remainder of the network beyond Upminster and Grays	Shoeburyness

== Phase 1 Fare Restructure ==
Phase 1 of Project Oval launched exclusively with adult fares, omitting all concessions. Unlike previous Oyster contactless expansions, traditional pre-purchased tickets (paper, smartcard, and barcode e-tickets) were streamlined to align directly with the new contactless fare structure. This restructuring took effect on 3 December 2023 and introduced several key changes:

=== Single vs. Return Tickets ===
Single fares were set at exactly half the price of a return, moving away from the old system where singles were only marginally cheaper. Return tickets remained available.

=== Super Off-Peak Tickets ===
Super Off-Peak tickets (including South Western Railway's "Evening Out" and "Sunday Out") were abolished. Standard off-peak fares were lowered to compensate.

=== Alignment with Transport for London's (TfL) Peak Times ===
Off-peak ticket validity was revised to match Transport for London's (TfL) peak and off-peak windows. This introduced the following restrictions:

- Morning Peak: Off-peak tickets were made invalid for departures between 4:30am and 9:30am.
- Evening Peak: Off-peak tickets were made invalid between 4pm and 7pm for journeys departing from London.
- Early Morning Contactless Anomaly: Off-peak paper/smartcard tickets were made invalid between 4:30am and 6:30am, though passengers using contactless PAYG during this window were charged an off-peak rate.
- Travelcard Exception: Off-Peak Day Travelcards retained their validity and remain valid during the evening peak.

=== Impact of the Restructuring ===
The 3 December 2023 overhaul triggered steep price increases for several existing journeys. For instance, an Anytime Day Return between London Waterloo and Egham jumped by approximately 30%. Passengers also faced higher costs on routes where Super Off-Peak and Off-Peak options were cut or restricted, forcing passengers to buy more expensive tickets.

However, since contactless payments did not support discounts at launch, Railcard and concession holders could avoid these higher Pay-As-You-Go rates by continuing to buy traditional paper tickets - allowing them to still benefit from the newly lowered single-fare pricing structure.

=== Implementation Delays and Rollout ===
The rollout of contactless payment to the new stations faced consecutive delays:

- June 2024 (Initial Phase): The system debuted on 30 June 2024 across six Chiltern stations, six months later than originally scheduled.
- September 2024 (The Cyberattack): The remaining 47 stations were set to go live on 22 September 2024; however, a major early-September cyberattack on TfL halted the launch.
- February 2025 (Final Activation): Following the security delay, contactless payments finally went live at these 47 stations on 2 February 2025.

== Phase 2 ==
On 20 January 2025, DfT announced that a further 49 stations would be integrated into the contactless ticketing system by the end of the year. The expansion mostly took effect on 14 December 2025.

However, due to issues identified during testing, Greater Anglia's contactless roll-out, which included Stansted Airport, Southend Airport and the newly opened station at Beaulieu Park, were delayed until 8 March 2026.

Train Operating Company / Companies	Route	Stations
Southern and Thameslink	Upper Warlingham to East Grinstead	Woldingham
Southern and Thameslink	Upper Warlingham to East Grinstead	Oxted
Southern and Thameslink	Upper Warlingham to East Grinstead	Hurst Green
Southern and Thameslink	Upper Warlingham to East Grinstead	Lingfield
Southern and Thameslink	Upper Warlingham to East Grinstead	Dormans
Southern and Thameslink	Upper Warlingham to East Grinstead	East Grinstead
Southern and GWR	Redhill to Reigate	Reigate
Southern and South Western Railway	Epsom to Dorking	Ashtead
Southern and South Western Railway	Epsom to Dorking	Leatherhead
Southern and South Western Railway	Epsom to Dorking	Box Hill & Westhumble
Southern and South Western Railway	Epsom to Dorking	Dorking
Chiltern Railways	Amersham and High Wycombe to Aylesbury Vale Parkway	Great Missenden
Chiltern Railways	Amersham and High Wycombe to Aylesbury Vale Parkway	Wendover
Chiltern Railways	Amersham and High Wycombe to Aylesbury Vale Parkway	Stoke Mandeville
Chiltern Railways	Amersham and High Wycombe to Aylesbury Vale Parkway	Aylesbury
Chiltern Railways	Amersham and High Wycombe to Aylesbury Vale Parkway	Aylesbury Vale Parkway
Chiltern Railways	Amersham and High Wycombe to Aylesbury Vale Parkway	Saunderton
Chiltern Railways	Amersham and High Wycombe to Aylesbury Vale Parkway	Princes Risborough
Chiltern Railways	Amersham and High Wycombe to Aylesbury Vale Parkway	Monks Risborough
Chiltern Railways	Amersham and High Wycombe to Aylesbury Vale Parkway	Little Kimble
EMR and Thameslink	Luton Airport Parkway to Harlington	Luton
EMR and Thameslink	Luton Airport Parkway to Harlington	Leagrave
EMR and Thameslink	Luton Airport Parkway to Harlington	Harlington
Thameslink and Great Northern	Welwyn Garden City and Hertford North to Baldock	Welwyn North
Thameslink and Great Northern	Welwyn Garden City and Hertford North to Baldock	Knebworth
Thameslink and Great Northern	Welwyn Garden City and Hertford North to Baldock	Watton-at-Stone
Thameslink and Great Northern	Welwyn Garden City and Hertford North to Baldock	Stevenage
Thameslink and Great Northern	Welwyn Garden City and Hertford North to Baldock	Hitchin
Thameslink and Great Northern	Welwyn Garden City and Hertford North to Baldock	Letchworth Garden City
Thameslink and Great Northern	Welwyn Garden City and Hertford North to Baldock	Baldock
Greater Anglia (Note: Due to issues identified during system testing, Greater Anglia's contactless roll-out was delayed until 8 March 2026.)	Broxbourne to Stansted Airport	Roydon
Greater Anglia	Broxbourne to Stansted Airport	Harlow Town
Greater Anglia	Broxbourne to Stansted Airport	Harlow Mill
Greater Anglia	Broxbourne to Stansted Airport	Sawbridgeworth
Greater Anglia	Broxbourne to Stansted Airport	Bishop's Stortford
Greater Anglia	Broxbourne to Stansted Airport	Stansted Mountfitchet
Greater Anglia	Broxbourne to Stansted Airport	Stansted Airport
Greater Anglia	Shenfield to Witham	Ingatestone
Greater Anglia	Shenfield to Witham	Chelmsford
Greater Anglia	Shenfield to Witham	Beaulieu Park (Note: Added to the phase after the initial announcement. Station opened 26 October 2025)
Greater Anglia	Shenfield to Witham	Hatfield Peverel
Greater Anglia	Shenfield to Witham	Witham
Greater Anglia	Shenfield to Southend Victoria	Billericay
Greater Anglia	Shenfield to Southend Victoria	Wickford
Greater Anglia	Shenfield to Southend Victoria	Rayleigh
Greater Anglia	Shenfield to Southend Victoria	Hockley
Greater Anglia	Shenfield to Southend Victoria	Rochford
Greater Anglia	Shenfield to Southend Victoria	Southend Airport
Greater Anglia	Shenfield to Southend Victoria	Prittlewell
Greater Anglia	Shenfield to Southend Victoria	Southend Victoria
