= Witham railway station =

Railway station in Essex, England

Witham
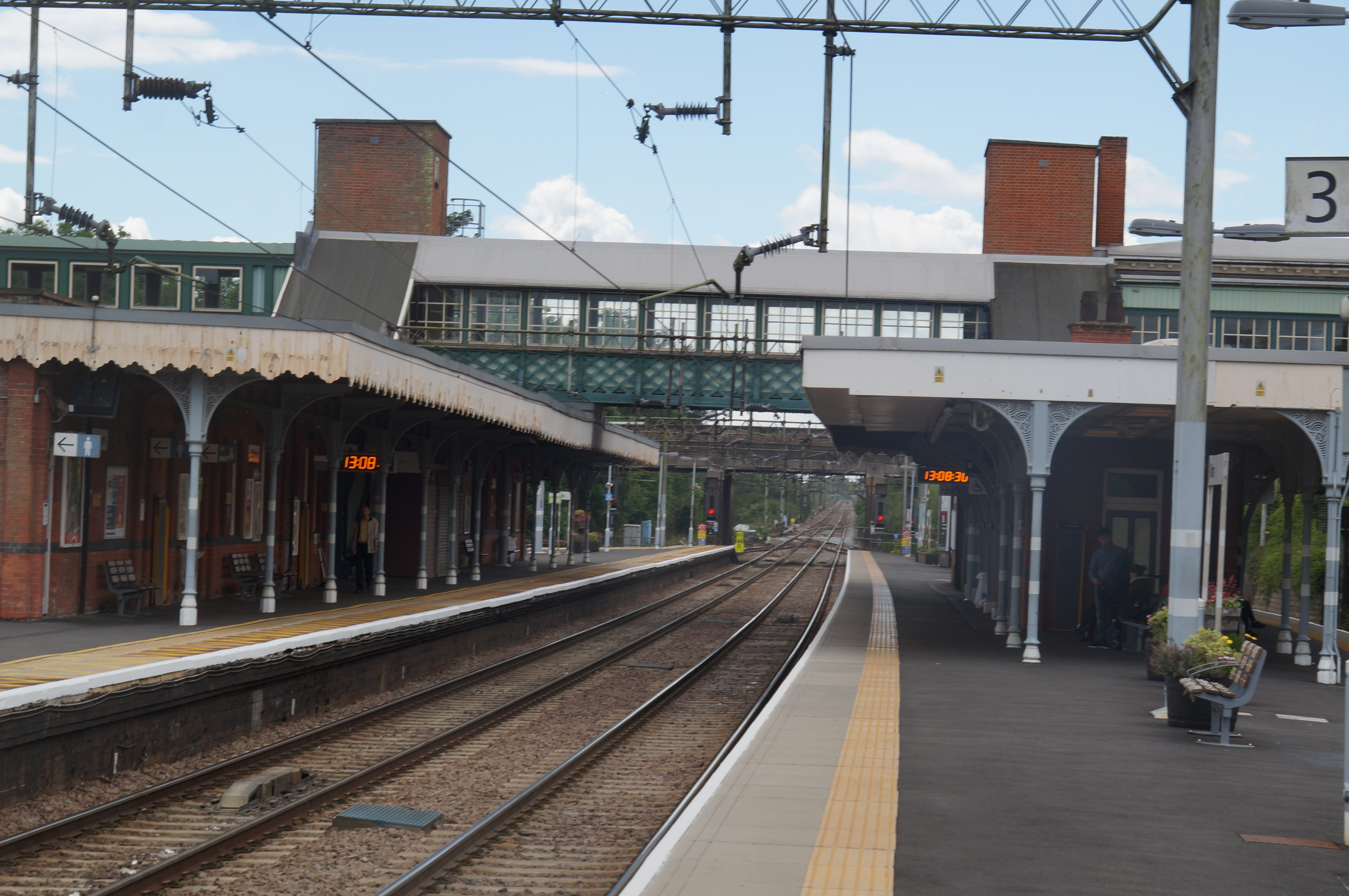
- Witham railway station in 2017, looking towards London

General information
- Location: Witham, District of Braintree; England
- Coordinates: 51°48′21.53″N 0°38′20.77″E
- Grid reference: TL820152
- Managed by: Greater Anglia
- Platforms: 4

Other information
- Station code: WTM
- Classification: DfT category C2

History
- Original company: Eastern Counties Railway
- Pre-grouping: Great Eastern Railway
- Post-grouping: London and North Eastern Railway

Key dates
- 1843: Opened

Passengers
- 2020/21: ▼0.479 million
- Interchange: ▼37,690
- 2021/22: ▲1.277 million
- Interchange: ▲0.105 million
- 2022/23: ▲1.618 million
- Interchange: ▲0.124 million
- 2023/24: ▲1.750 million
- Interchange: ▲0.135 million
- 2024/25: ▲1.924 million
- Interchange: ▲0.158 million
Location
Notes
- Passenger statistics from the Office of Rail and Road

Witham railway station is on the Great Eastern Main Line (GEML) in the East of England, serving the town of Witham, Essex. It is situated about half a mile (1 km) from the north of the town centre and is 38 miles 48 chains (62.1 km) down the line from London Liverpool Street. On the GEML, Witham is situated between Hatfield Peverel to the west and Kelvedon to the east. It is the junction for the Braintree Branch Line to the north-west, which opened in 1848; between 1848 and 1964, it was also the junction for a south-east-facing branch line to Maldon. Its three-letter station code is WTM.

The station was opened in 1843 by the Eastern Counties Railway. It is currently operated by Greater Anglia, who also operate all trains serving it, as part of the East Anglia franchise.

== History ==
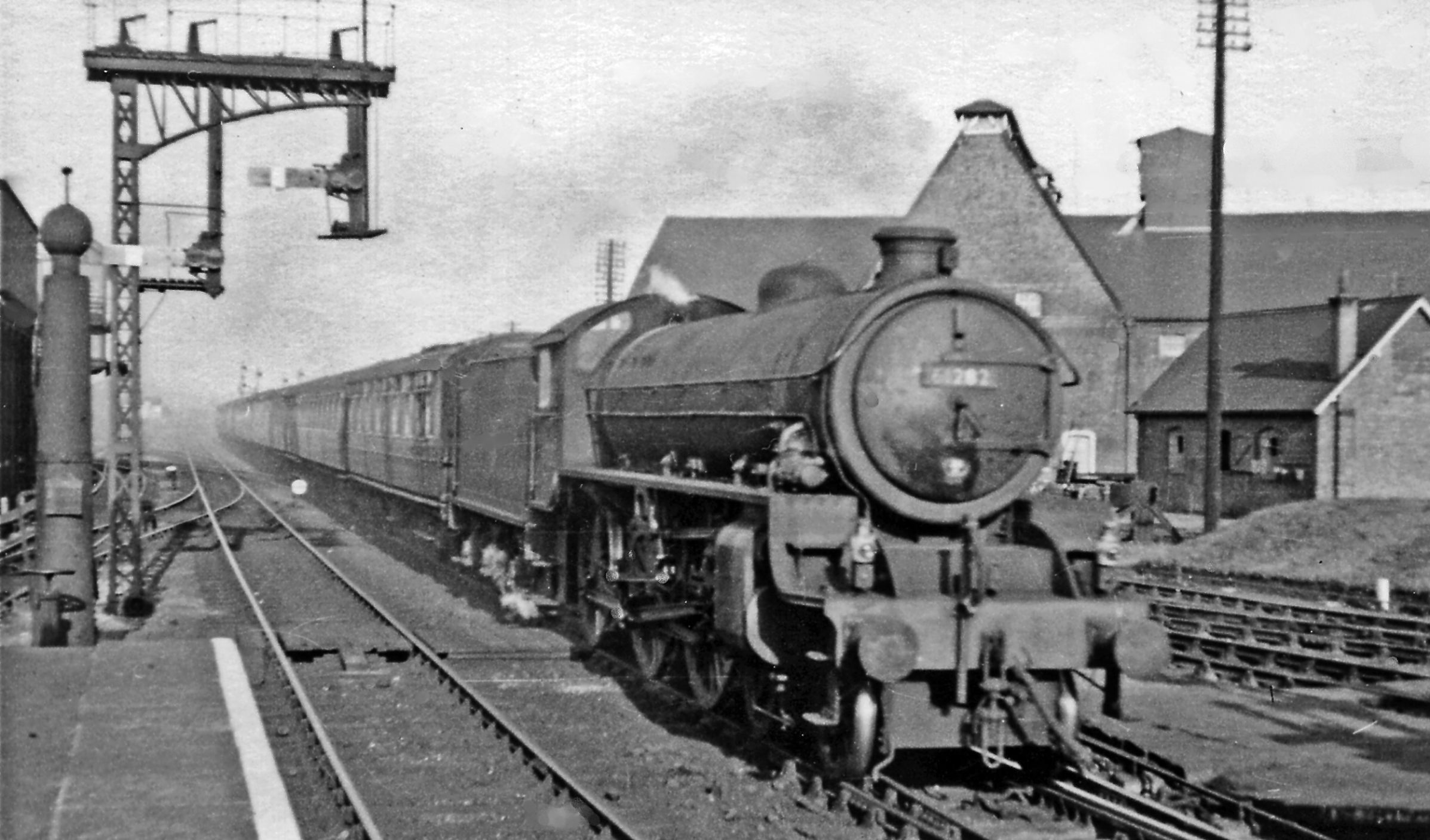
A Cromer to London Liverpool Street express train at Witham in 1951

The section of the Eastern Counties Railway (ECR) between Brentwood and Colchester entered operation on 29 March 1843; Witham station opened on the same day. The station became a junction five years later with the opening of the Maldon, Witham & Braintree Railway (MW&B) for goods trains on 15 August 1848; passenger services on the line began on 2 October 1848. The MW&B was later absorbed by the ECR, which itself amalgamated with other companies in 1862 to form the Great Eastern Railway.

=== Accidents ===
- On 1 January 1899, eight people were injured in a collision at Witham. At around 7:30 pm, the 7:15 pm service from Maldon East collided side-long with a cattle train that was being shunted into a siding. Some of the cattle wagons were derailed and some of the sheep on board were killed. The incident was blamed on signalman error.

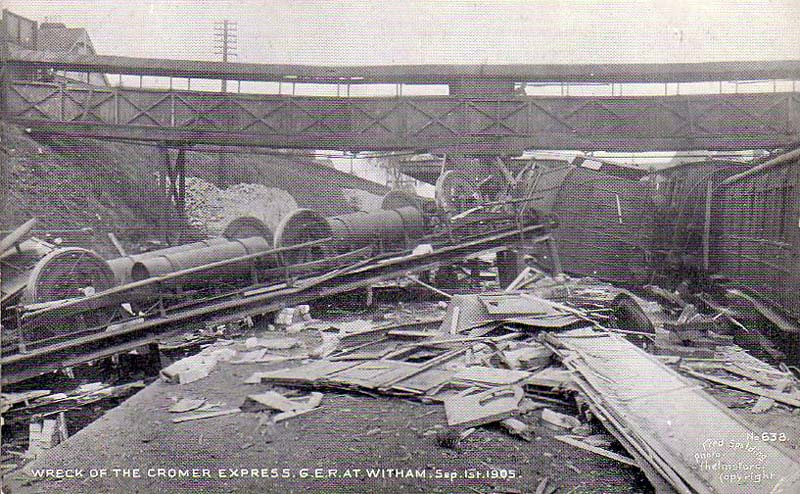
Witham station derailment, 1 September 1905

- On 1 September 1905, the 09:27 London Liverpool Street to Cromer 14-coach express derailed whilst travelling at speed through the station. Ten passengers and a luggage porter were killed when several of the carriages somersaulted on to the platforms causing considerable damage to the rolling stock and the station. Seventy-one passengers were seriously injured. It remains to this day the worst single loss of life in a railway accident in Essex. In 2005, an opportunity to commemorate the centenary was missed and the incident is now largely forgotten. Ben Sainty, a signalman whose quick action averted the next train hitting the wreckage, has a road named after him in the town: Ben Sainty Court.

== Layout ==
Platform 1 is rarely used except for peak-hour services to and from London Liverpool Street starting or terminating at Witham; a limited number of through-trains towards London use this platform as well. Platform 1 was formerly used by trains on the now disused Witham-Maldon branch line. Platform 2 is typically used by services towards London and platform 3 is for country-bound trains. Platform 4 is for Braintree branch services; this platform may also be used by through eastbound services stopping during peak times to allow fast express trains to pass through unhindered. Some evening peak services terminating at Witham also use platform 4. A new passing loop is planned to the north of Witham to further enable express services to overtake stopping services in either direction.

The station's car park is situated next to the station. To access the car park from the station passengers once had to exit onto the street and take a substantial walk to the road bridge across the tracks situated just past the western end of the station, over the bridge and then down a residential road the other side of the tracks. Passengers campaigned for a remedy to this issue for many years. In 2001 funding was announced to build a footbridge direct from the station to the car park, but this was subsequently withdrawn indefinitely due to financial cutbacks following the collapse of Railtrack. Reports of a new funding package for a footbridge emerged in 2008. Work took place between in 2011 which included a new entrance at the station to provide access to and from the adjacent car park. The footbridge opened in August 2011. The improvements also saw new disabled parking facilities, a customer help point and information point and new sheltered cycle storage.

An 1897 survey of the station shows a small system of sidings on the down-side at the London end and also a siding with a turntable at the country end off the Braintree branch. On the up-side there were sidings serving an auction mart and cattle pens at the London end; and the Maltings and a coal yard at the country end accessed from both the main line and the Maldon branch. The Maldon branch had at an earlier date been served by a triangular junction which facilitated direct running from Colchester but it is shown as disconnected in 1897.

== Services ==
All services are operated by Greater Anglia. The typical off-peak service pattern is:

- 4 tph (trains per hour) to London Liverpool Street
- 1 tph to Ipswich
- 1 tph to Colchester Town
- 1 tph to Clacton-on-Sea
- 1 tph to Braintree.

One inter-city service calls in each direction at Witham per day, in the early morning and late evening on weekdays, to provide a direct service to and from Norwich. At all other times, passengers must change at Colchester or Ipswich.

Preceding station	National Rail	Following station
Hatfield Peverel	Greater Anglia Great Eastern Main Line	Kelvedon
Chelmsford	Greater Anglia Braintree Branch Line	White Notley
Historical railways
Chelmsford	Anglia Railways London Crosslink	Colchester
Disused railways
Terminus	Great Eastern Railway Witham to Maldon Branch Line	Wickham Bishops
