= Great Eastern Main Line =

Principal railway route in eastern England

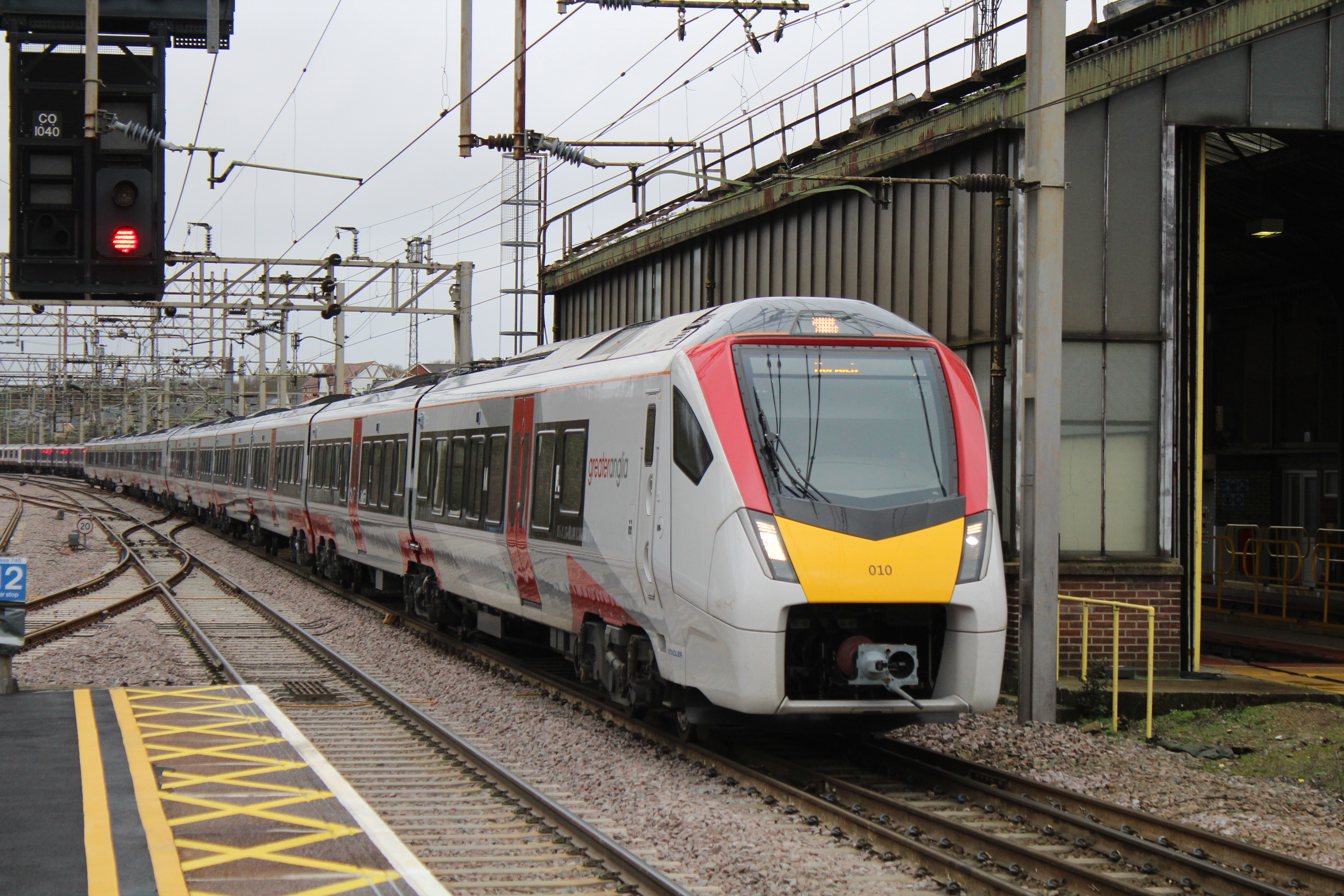
- A Class 745 unit at Colchester, 2020

Overview
- Status: Operational
- Owner: Network Rail
- Locale: Greater London, East of England
- Termini: London Liverpool Street, (Note: Liverpool Street station is located at: 51.5188°N 0.0815°W.); Norwich (Note: Norwich station is located at: 52.6267°N 1.3067°E.)
- Stations: 27

Service
- Type: Inter-city, commuter rail, regional rail
- System: National Rail
- Operator(s): Greater Anglia, Elizabeth line, East Midlands Railway, c2c (limited)
- Depot(s): Norwich Crown Point, Ilford, Clacton-on-Sea, Colchester
- Rolling stock: Class 345 Aventra, Class 357 Electrostar, Class 720 Aventra, Class 745 FLIRT, Class 755 FLIRT

History
- Opened: 1862; 164 years ago

Technical
- Line length: 114 miles 40 chains (184.3 km)
- Num of tracks: 1–6
- Track gauge: 1,435 mm (4 ft 8 1/2 in) standard gauge
- Old gauge: 5 ft (1,524 mm) until 1844
- Electrification: Mk1 and GEFF 25 kV 50 Hz AC OHLE
- Operating speed: 100 mph (160 km/h)
Route map
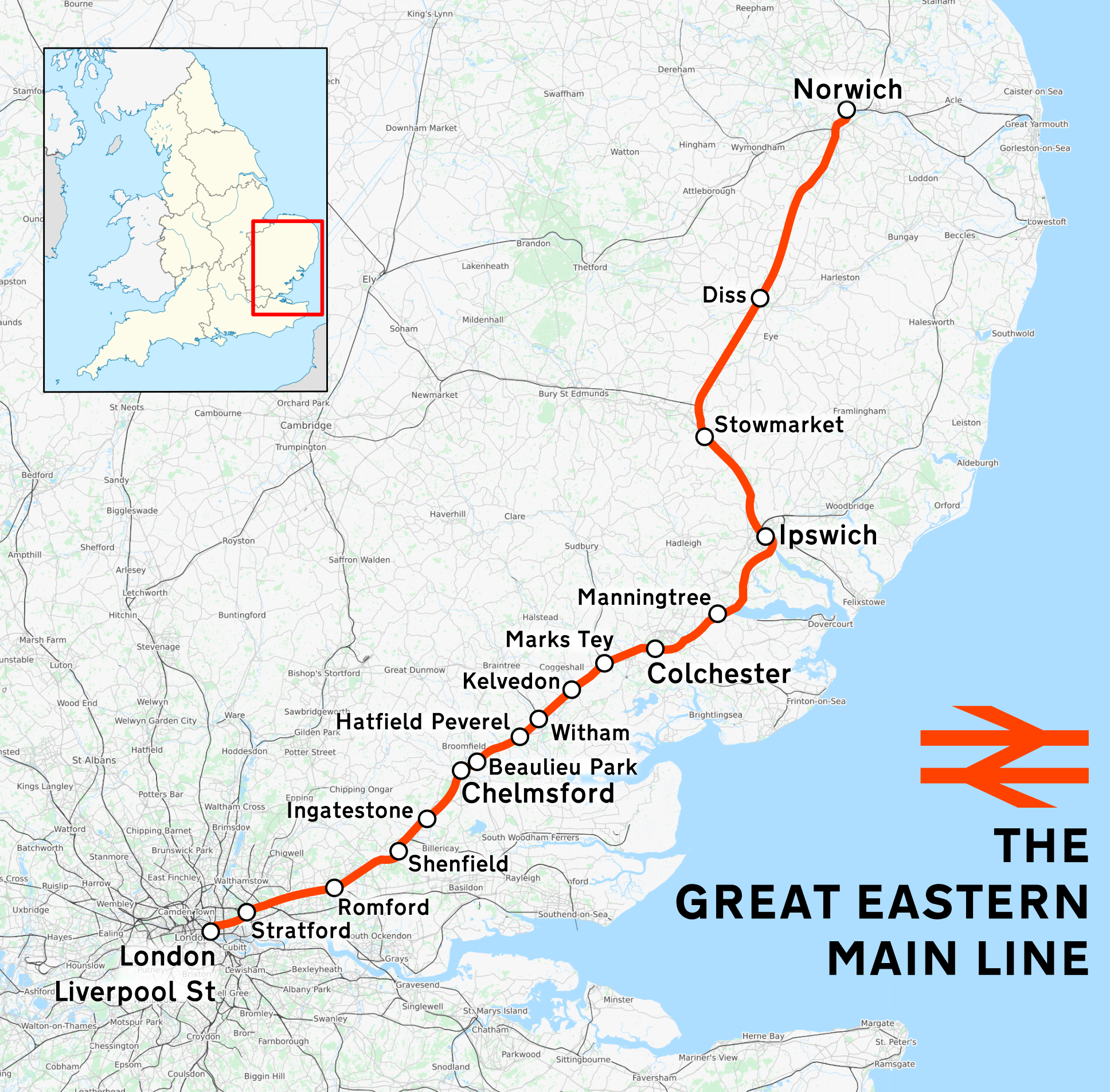

The Great Eastern Main Line (GEML, sometimes referred to as the East Anglia Main Line) is a 114.5-mile (184.3 km) major railway line on the British railway system which connects Liverpool Street in central London with destinations in east London and the East of England, including Shenfield, Chelmsford, Colchester, Ipswich and Norwich. Its numerous branches also connect the main line to Southminster, Braintree, Sudbury, Harwich and a number of coastal towns including Southend-on-Sea, Clacton-on-Sea, Walton-on-the-Naze and Lowestoft.

Its main users are commuters travelling to and from London, particularly the City of London, which is served by Liverpool Street, and areas in east London, including the Docklands financial district via the London Underground and Docklands Light Railway connections at Stratford. The line is also heavily used by leisure travellers, as it and its branches serve a number of seaside resorts, shopping areas and countryside destinations. The route also provides the main artery for substantial freight traffic to and from the Port of Felixstowe and Harwich International Port, via their respective branch lines. Trains from Southend Airport also run into London via the GEML.

The Elizabeth line, which was fully opened in November 2022, operates services from Shenfield to London Paddington, via Liverpool Street, connecting Essex with Central and West London. Additionally, it provides a direct rail link between the GEML and the Great Western Main Line.

== History ==
=== Eastern Counties and Eastern Union Railways (1839–1862) ===
The first section of the line, built by the Eastern Counties Railway (ECR), opened in June 1839 between a short-lived temporary terminus at Devonshire Street in the East End of London and Romford, then in the Havering Liberty in Essex. The London terminus was moved in July 1840 to Shoreditch (later renamed Bishopsgate), after 1900 in the Metropolitan Borough of Bethnal Green, and at the eastern end the line was extended 6 miles (9.7 km) out to Brentwood in the same year. A further 34 miles (55 km) of track was added out to Colchester by 1843. The original gauge for the line was 5 ft (1,524 mm), but this was converted to 1,435 mm (4 ft 8 1/2 in) standard gauge in 1844.

The section of line between Colchester and Ipswich was built by the Eastern Union Railway (EUR) to standard gauge and opened to passenger traffic in June 1846. Its sister company, the Ipswich and Bury Railway, built a line to Bury St Edmunds and this was completed in November 1846. Both companies shared the same office, many directors and key staff; it started operating as a unified company with the EUR name from 1 January 1847. An extension from a new junction at Haughley to Norwich Victoria opened in December 1849, although the position of the latter station was poor and a spur to allow some trains to operate into Norwich (Thorpe) station was opened to regular traffic in November 1851.

In the late 19th century, the double-tracked main line was expanded with additional tracks being added to cope with more traffic. In 1854, a third track was added between Bow Junction and Stratford to help accommodate London, Tilbury and Southend Railway services which at that time were operating via Stratford.

Until 1860, trains serving the town of Ipswich used a station called Ipswich Stoke Hill which was located south of the Stoke tunnel. The town's current station is located to the north of the tunnel.

The ECR had leased the EUR from 1854 but by the 1860s, the railways in East Anglia were in financial trouble and most were leased to the ECR; they wished to amalgamate formally, but could not obtain government agreement for this until 1862, when the Great Eastern Railway (GER) was formed out of the consolidation.

=== Great Eastern Railway (1862–1922) ===
From November 1872, Bishopsgate (Low Level) became a temporary terminus to relieve the main high level Bishopsgate station while the GER was building its new permanent terminus at Liverpool Street. The latter opened in stages from February 1874, beginning with the first four platforms, until it was fully open from November 1875. At that time, the original 1840 Bishopsgate station closed to passengers and was converted into a goods yard.

By the 1870s, suburbia in the Forest Gate area was developing quickly and, in 1872, suburban trains (Note: This was the first distinctive suburban service on the main line as previously main line trains had performed this duty.) terminated at a bay platform at Forest Gate. These were followed by trains from Fenchurch Street in 1877. (Note: Fenchurch Street was served by GER and LTSR services at this time and GER services were routed via Bow Road.) By 1882, these services had been extended and were terminating at Ilford, Romford or Brentwood.

In 1877, a fourth track was added between Bow Junction and Stratford and two goods-only tracks were added between Stratford and Maryland Point. This section was extended back to James Street Junction (Note: Near to Globe Road station, which opened in the same year.) in 1884, but Bethnal Green to James Street did not follow until 1891. It was also in this year that two extra tracks were added between Bethnal Green and Liverpool Street, which were for the use of West Anglia Main Line services. These tracks were built through the basement warehousing associated with Bishopsgate station located above.

The line was quadrupled to Ilford in 1895 and out to Seven Kings in 1899.

In 1902, the quadruple track was extended from Seven Kings to Romford, but it was not until 1913 that four-tracking out to Shenfield was suggested; the First World War caused delay to this plan. In 1903, the Fairlop Loop opened and a number of services that had previously terminated at Ilford were extended onto it. These services generally looped round and back to the GEML at Stratford (on the Cambridge line platforms).

=== London and North Eastern Railway (1923–1947) ===
The GER was grouped in 1923 into the London and North Eastern Railway (LNER). In 1931-32, the LNER quadrupled the tracks to Shenfield which became the terminus for inner-suburban operation.

In the 1930s, a flyover was constructed just west of Ilford to switch the main and electric lines over, to enable main line trains to utilise Liverpool Street's longer west side platforms without having to cross east side suburban traffic in the station throat. The new arrangement also facilitated cross-platform interchange with the Central line at Stratford, with services commencing in 1946. Either side of the Ilford flyover there are single-track connections between each pair of lines, with the westbound track extending to Manor Park and just beyond. The eastbound track extends as far as Ilford station. It was also envisaged that a flyover would be built at the country-end of the carriage sidings at Gidea Park to allow trains bound for the Southend Line to change from the main line to the electric line, instead of at the London-end of Shenfield as they do now.

Plans were drawn up in the 1930s to electrify the suburban lines from Liverpool Street to Shenfield at 1,500 V DC and work was started on implementing this. However, the outbreak of the Second World War brought the project to a temporary halt and it was not until 1949 that the scheme was completed with electrification being extended to Chelmsford in 1956.

During the war, the long-distance named trains were withdrawn; these returned afterwards with the reintroduction of the "Hook Continental" and "Scandinavian" boat trains to Harwich Parkeston Quay in 1945. The East Anglian (Liverpool Street – Norwich) was restored in October 1946, and in 1947 the "Day Continental" which pre-war had operated as the "Flushing Continental", recommenced operation.

=== British Railways (1948–1994) ===
After nationalisation in 1948, the GEML formed part of the Eastern Region of British Railways.

The Summer 1950 timetable saw the introduction of a regular interval service between Liverpool Street and Clacton, which left Liverpool Street on the half-hour and Clacton on the hour. Summer Saturdays in 1950 also saw the introduction of the Holiday Camps Express workings to Gorleston, near Lowestoft. The latter half of 1950 and early 1951 saw the testing of new EM1 electric locomotives for use over the Woodhead Line between Manchester London Road and Sheffield Victoria.

January 1951 saw the introduction of the Britannia class 4-6-2 express locomotives and a speeding up of services on the GEML. However, not everyone was a fan; British Railways' chairman Sir Michael Barrington Ward exclaimed "What? Send the first British Railways standard engines to that tramline? No!"

Twenty-three Britannias were allocated to the GE section and, in summer 1951, the Liverpool Street–Norwich service went over to an hourly clockface interval service.

The British Railways 1955 Modernisation Plan called for overhead line systems in Great Britain to be standardised at 25 kV AC. However, due to low clearances under bridges, the route was electrified at 6.25 kV AC. The section between Liverpool Street and Southend Victoria was completed in November 1960. Extensive testing showed that smaller electrical clearances could be tolerated for the 25 kV system than originally thought necessary. As a result, it was now possible to increase the voltage without having to either raise bridges or lower the tracks along the route to obtain larger clearances. The route between Liverpool Street and Southend Victoria was converted to 25 kV AC between 1976 and 1980.

By the late 1970s, the costs of running the dated mechanical signalling systems north of Colchester was recognised and, in 1978, a scheme for track rationalisation and resignalling was duly submitted to the Department of Transport. This was followed by a proposal, in 1980, to electrify the remainder of the Great Eastern Main Line.

The early 1980s saw track rationalisation and signalling work carried out in the Ipswich area and, on 9 April 1985, the first electric train consisting of two Class 305 electric multiple units (EMUs) worked into Ipswich station. The previous year, another member of the class had been dragged to Ipswich by a diesel locomotive and was used for crew training. The first passenger-carrying train was formed of Class 309 EMUs, which ran on 17 April 1985.

InterCity electric-hauled trains commenced on the route on 1 May 1985. Class 86 electric locomotives initially only powered services between Liverpool Street and Ipswich; after a switchover, Class 47s would complete the journey between Ipswich and Norwich. This last section was finally energised in May 1987, when through electric services commenced.

In 1986, the line as far as Manningtree became part of the Network SouthEast sector, although some NSE services actually terminated at Ipswich, whilst longer-distance Norwich services were operated by InterCity. Local services operating from the Ipswich and Norwich areas were operated by Regional Railways.

=== Privatisation era (1994 onwards) ===
Between 1997 and 2004, services into Essex and some into Suffolk were operated by First Great Eastern, whilst services into Norfolk and other Suffolk services were operated by Anglia Railways. Between 2004 and 2012, services out of Liverpool Street, except for a limited number of c2c trains, were all operated by National Express East Anglia. Since 2012, the franchise has been operated by Greater Anglia; in May 2015, the Shenfield metro stopping service transferred to TfL Rail, as a precursor to Elizabeth line services.

Liverpool Street IECC replaced signal boxes at Bethnal Green (closed 1997), Bow (closed 1996), Stratford (GE panel closed 1997), Ilford (closed 1996), Romford (closed 1998), Gidea Park (closed 1998), Shenfield (closed 1992) and Chelmsford (closed 1994). The system uses BR Mark 3 solid state interlockings, predominantly four-aspect signals and a combination of Smiths clamp-lock and GEC-Alsthom HW2000 point machines.

The first signal box to be closed and transferred to Liverpool Street IECC was Shenfield in 1992, which had only opened 10 years earlier. The last boxes to be transferred were at Romford and Gidea Park in 1998; these were the oldest of those being transferred, having been opened under the GER/LNER 1924 resignalling scheme.

The construction of Beaulieu Park (Chelmsford's second station) started in 2023 and opened in October 2025. It was the first station on the railway line for over 100 years.

== Accidents and incidents ==
A number of fatal accidents have occurred on the line throughout its history:

- 1840: Brentwood; four killed
- 1872: Kelvedon; one killed and 16 injured in a derailment
- 1905: Witham rail crash; 11 killed and 71 injured in a derailment
- 1913: Colchester; three killed and 14 injured in a collision and derailment
- 1915: Ilford rail crash; 10 killed and 500 injured in a collision between two trains
- 1941: Brentwood; seven killed in a collision between two trains
- 1944: Ilford; nine killed and 38 injured in a collision between two trains
- 1944: Romford; one killed and three injured in a collision between two trains.

== Infrastructure ==
The line is owned and maintained by Network Rail. It is part of Network Rail Strategic Route 7, which is composed of SRSs 07.01, 07.02 and 07.03, and is classified as a primary line. The GEML has a loading gauge of W10 between Liverpool Street and Haughley Junction (approximately 13 miles 63 chains (22.2 km) north of Ipswich) and from there is W9 to Norwich. The maximum line speed is 100 mph (160 km/h).

Between Romford and Chadwell Heath, there is a Network Rail maintenance depot adjacent to the Jutsums Lane overbridge. In addition, at the London-end of the depot, is Network Rail's Electrical Control Room that controls the supply and switching of the overhead line system for the whole of the former Anglia Region.

Signalling is controlled by two main signalling centres: Liverpool Street IECC (opened in 1992) and Colchester PSB (opened in December 1983). Liverpool Street IECC controls signalling up to Marks Tey, where it fringes with Colchester PSB, which has control to Norwich. There are also several small signal boxes that control local infrastructure, such as Ingatestone box, which has jurisdiction over several local level crossings.

Line-side train monitoring equipment includes hot axle box detectors (HABD) on the down main and down electric lines near Brentwood (Note: Brentwood lies 17 miles 35 chains (28.1 km) from Liverpool Street.) and on the up main near Margaretting (25 miles 78 chains (41.8 km)). Other equipment includes wheel impact load detectors (WILD) ‘Wheelchex’ on the down main and up main west of Church Lane level crossing (24 miles 75 chains (40.1 km)).

=== Track layout ===
On leaving Liverpool Street, the route comprises two pairs of tracks, known as the mains and the electrics, with a further pair of tracks, the suburbans, which carry the West Anglia Main Line alongside the GEML to Bethnal Green.

From Bethnal Green, the GEML has four lines to Bow junction, where there is a complex set of switches and crossings. A line from the LTS (Fenchurch Street) route joins the up (London-bound) electric and there are a further two lines, the up and down Temple Mills, giving access to the North London Line and Temple Mills. The GEML has six tracks up to the London-end of Stratford and the junction to Temple Mills; there are five lines through the station, dropping to four at the country end.

At Shenfield, the line to Southend Victoria diverges and the main line route drops from four tracks to two; this arrangement continues for the vast majority of the way to Norwich. There are several locations where the route has more than two tracks, predominantly through stations such as Colchester and Ipswich, along with goods loops, such as at the London end of Ingatestone. There is also a short stretch of single track on approach to Norwich, as the line passes over the river Wensum on the Trowse Bridge.

=== Tunnel and viaducts ===
Major civil engineering structures on the Great Eastern Main Line include the following:

Tunnel and viaducts on the Great Eastern Main Line
Railway atructure	Length	Distance from Liverpool Street	Location
Trowse Swing Bridge (River Wensum)		123 miles 37 chains (198.7 km) (via Cambridge)	Norwich
Lakenham Viaduct (including River Yare)	8 chains (160 m)	112 miles 33 chains (180.9 km) – 112 miles 25 chains (180.7 km) (via Ipswich)	Between Norwich and Diss stations
Thraston Viaduct (River Tas)		105 miles 62 chains (170.2 km) (via Ipswich)	Between Norwich and Diss stations
River Waveney Viaduct		94 miles 54 chains (152.4 km) (via Ipswich)	South of Diss station
Badley Viaduct (River Gipping)	2 chains (40 m)	79 miles 9 chains (127.3 km) – 79 miles 7 chains (127.3 km) (via Ipswich)	Between Stowmarket and Needham Market stations
Ipswich or Stoke Tunnel	361 yards (330 m)	68 miles 47 chains (110.4 km) – 68 miles 31 chains (110.1 km)	South of Ipswich station
Cattawade Viaduct	4 chains (80 m)	60 miles 10 chains (96.8 km) – 60 miles 6 chains (96.7 km)	East of Manningtree station
River Stour Viaduct	4 chains (80 m)	59 miles 75 chains (96.5 km) – 59 miles 71 chains (96.4 km)	East of Manningtree station
Lexden Viaduct (River Colne)	6 chains (120 m)	49 miles 69 chains (80.2 km) – 49 miles 63 chains (80.1 km)	West of Colchester (North) station
River Ter Viaduct		35 miles 22 chains (56.8 km)	Between Hatfield Peverel and Chelmsford stations
Boreham Viaduct	3 chains (60 m)	32 miles 72 chains (52.9 km) – 32 miles 69 chains (52.9 km)	Between Hatfield Peverel and Chelmsford stations
River Chelmer Viaduct		30 miles 25 chains (48.8 km)	East of Chelmsford station
Chelmsford Viaduct	24 chains (480 m)	29 miles 64 chains (48.0 km) – 29 miles 40 chains (47.5 km)	West of Chelmsford station
River Can Viaduct	3 chains (60 m)	29 miles 36 chains (47.4 km) – 29 miles 26 chains (47.2 km)	West of Chelmsford station
Ilford or Aldersbrook Flyover		6 miles 78 chains (11.2 km)	West of Ilford station
Bethnal Green Viaduct	1 mile 6 chains (1,700 m)	1 mile 58 chains (2.8 km) – 52 chains (1.0 km)	Bethnal Green

==== Stoke tunnel ====
The only tunnel on the line is immediately south of Ipswich station. The 361-yard (330 m) long tunnel was built by Peter Bruff as part of the Ipswich & Bury Railway. It was completed in 1846 and it is thought to be the earliest driven on a sharp continuous curve. During the excavation of the tunnel, many important fossils were discovered, including rhinoceros, lion and mammoth; the site was known as the "Stoke Bone Beds". The finds are considered important in understanding climate change during the Ice Age. This tunnel had the trackbed lowered so the line could accommodate taller freight trains.

=== Electrification ===
The main line is electrified at 25 kV AC 50 Hz using overhead wires under the control of Romford Electrical Control Room. The branches to Upminster, Southend Victoria, Southminster, Braintree, Clacton-on-Sea, Walton-on-the-Naze and Harwich Town are also electrified. The history of electrification on the GEML and adjoining routes is unusually complicated with parts of the line having been electrified with three different systems. Due to this, as well as traffic demands growing throughout the 21st century, the traction supply feeding arrangements are complex and somewhat unintuitive with several seemingly redundant features.

The earliest stretch of electrification was between Liverpool Street (only platforms 11–18) to Shenfield along with the branch from Fenchurch Street (platforms 1 and 2) down the Bow Curve in 1949. This was an overhead line system (OLE) at 1.5 kV DC and was extended to Chelmsford and Southend Victoria in 1956. Over the weekend of 5 and 6 November 1960, the system was converted to 6.25 kV AC at mains frequency (50 Hz) between Liverpool Street and Southend Victoria, with the wires from Shenfield to Chelmsford taken out of use to be converted to 25 kV AC until re-energisation on 20 March 1961.(although passenger service with electric trains did not return until the next year). The low voltage AC utilised broadly the same substations, grid connections, OLE components and electrical clearances as the previous DC system. At around the same time, the rest of the platforms and lines out of Liverpool Street (the Lea Valley lines) and out of Fenchurch Street were electrified also at 6.25 kV AC in November 1960 and November 1961 respectively.

After this point, electrification was extended up the Great Eastern Main Line and on several branches all at 25 kV AC. The line from Colchester to Clacton-on-Sea and Walton-on-the-Naze was previously electrified in 1959 and the gap was filled between Colchester and Chelmsford on 18 June 1962. From 1975 until 1988, all the sections of 6.25 kV AC around London and Southend across all lines in the Anglia region were converted to 25 kV AC requiring new substations and significant modifications to the OLE components. In 2022, a small section between Bow Junction and Gidea Park was upgraded to a two AC autotransformer system in order to support the Elizabeth line service. The full timeline for the electrification on the GEML and branches is summarised below.

Timeline of GEML electrification
Date	Route	Action	Voltage	OLE System
26 September 1949	London Liverpool Street (plat. 11–18) to Shenfield London Fenchurch Street (plat. 1–2) to Bow Junction (Note: Over the Bow Curve, line was and is rarely used)	new build	1.5 kV DC	GE/MSW
11 June 1956	Shenfield to Chelmsford	new build	1.5 kV DC	SCS
31 December 1956	Shenfield to Southend Victoria	new build	1.5 kV DC	SCS
16 March 1959	Colchester to Clacton-on-Sea/Walton-on-the-Naze (Note: Along with the Styal line in the North West, this line was a testbed for mains frequency AC electrification that has been standard ever since)	new build	25 kV AC 50 Hz	Mark 1
4 November 1960	Shenfield to Chelmsford London Fenchurch Street to Bow Junction (Note: Line was de-energised due to the impending electrification of all routes out of Fenchurch Street)	de-energisation	(earthed)	—
6 November 1960	London Liverpool Street to Southend Victoria	conversion	6.25 kV AC 50 Hz	—
21 November 1960	London Liverpool Street (plat. 1–10) to Chingford/Enfield Town/Cheshunt via Seven Sisters (Note: This scheme also electrified the lines from Cheshunt to Bishops Stortford and Broxbourne to Hertford East but at 25 kV AC with a voltage changeover at Cheshunt)	new build	6.25 kV AC 50 Hz	Mark 1
6 November 1961	Fenchurch Street (all platforms) to Barking/Bow Junction Forest Gate Junction to Barking (Note: This scheme also electrified both lines out of Barking but at 25 kV AC with the voltage changeover near Upney on the main routes and some distance before Ripple Lane on the Tilbury Loop. Both lines converge at Pitsea and then change back to 6.25 kV AC from Leigh-on-Sea to the terminus at Shoeburyness)	new build/ re-energisation	6.25 kV AC 50 Hz	Mark 1 (on new parts)
20 March 1961	Shenfield to Chelmsford (Note: Using a new 25 kV feeder station at Shenfield which later fed back towards Gidea Park)	re-energisation	25 kV AC 50 Hz	—
18 June 1962	Chelmsford to Colchester	new build	25 kV AC 50 Hz	Mark 1
1 January 1976	Gidea Park to Shenfield	conversion	25 kV AC 50 Hz	—
31 October 1977	Witham to Braintree	new build	25 kV AC 50 Hz	Mark 3a
2 March 1980	Manor Park to Gidea Park (Note: Using a new 25 kV feeder station at Crowlands)	conversion	25 kV AC 50 Hz	—
14 September 1980	Bow Junction to Manor Park (Note: Using one half of a new 25 kV feeder station at Bow Junction)	conversion	25 kV AC 50 Hz	—
12 October 1980	London Liverpool Street to Bow Junction London Liverpool Street to Hackney Downs (Note: Full commissioning of Bow Junction feeder station, the approach to Liverpool Street from Bow Junction, and the WAML from Bethnal Green to Hackney Downs are electrically common) Shenfield to Southend Victoria (Note: Not currently known at what point between March and October 1980 that the Southend Line was converted)	conversion	25 kV AC 50 Hz	—
13 May 1985	Colchester to Ipswich	new build	25 kV AC 50 Hz	Mark 3b
22 July 1985	Ipswich to Stowmarket	new build	25 kV AC 50 Hz	Mark 3b
12 May 1986	Wickford to Southminster	new build	25 kV AC 50 Hz	Mark 3b
12 May 1986	Manningtree to Harwich	new build	25 kV AC 50 Hz	Mark 3b
12 May 1986	Romford to Upminster	new build	25 kV AC 50 Hz	Mark 3b
11 May 1987	Stowmarket to Norwich	new build	25 kV AC 50 Hz	Mark 3b
~1988	London Fenchurch Street to Barking/Bow Junction Forest Gate Junction to Barking Leigh-on-Sea to Shoeburyness	conversion	25 kV AC 50 Hz	—
~2022	London Liverpool Street to Chelmsford Shenfield to Southend Victoria	re-equipping of OLE system (Note: This scheme replaced all OLE components that originated from 1949 or 1956 and took 15 years to complete beginning in 2007. Voltage and feeding was unaffected. "GEFF" stands for "Great Eastern Furrer+Frey", who were the designer for the bespoke system.)	—	GEFF
24 June 2022	Bow Junction to Gidea Park	conversion to AT feeding	2x 25 kV AC (Autotransformer system)	—

==== Historic 6.25 kV / 25 kV voltage changeover ====
Since trains would through-run between 6.25 kV and 25 kV sections in regular operation, all EMUs built for the Anglia region between 1960 and 1980 were fitted for dual AC voltage with equipment to automatically switch between the two power systems while running. The main transformer on the train had four identical primary windings which could be connected in series for 25 kV working, or in parallel for 6.25 kV working, by means of a "supply changeover switch". It was vital that the changeover switch was in the correct position since, if the voltage was too low, the train could not operate, while if the voltage was too high, serious damage could occur. For this reason, the switchover had to be made automatically by way of voltage sensing equipment rather than rely on the driver operating controls.

At the points where the two systems met – such as on the main line just east of Shenfield – there was a short length of overhead line which was electrically neutral. Neutral sections were installed either at breaks between supply areas or where the two voltages met. Whether or not the voltage was different on the other side of the neutral section, the on-train equipment operated in exactly the same way. At each end of the neutral section there were track-mounted permeant magnets referred to as Automatic Power Control (APC) magnets.

On board the train, the operation of the dual-voltage mechanism depended on the action of the main air-blast circuit breaker and voltage-sensing relays. When passing the first APC magnet, detection equipment fitted to the bogies would activate the circuit breaker cutting all power to the train. Once the train had passed the neutral section, the second set of APC magnets are detected by the bogie-mounted inducers which causes a lock to be released on the circuit breaker meaning its reclosing would be under the control of the voltage-detection equipment. This consisted of four voltage relays that would allow for a line voltage between 4.1 and 6.9 kV for the low-voltage mode, and 16.5 to 27.5 kV for the high-voltage mode. If the first relay was tripped, the changeover switch at the transformer was set to the low-voltage mode and the circuit breaker closed. All four relays were activated if the voltage was above 16.5 kV. In that case, the current was sent to a magnetic switch that would set the changeover switch at the transformer to the 25 kV position.

The other relays were installed to stop the changeover switch from being activated to low-voltage mode if the line voltage fell under 16.5 kV but greater than 6.9 kV. The changeover system was interlocked with the circuit breaker and the action of the APC magnets since any movement of the changeover switch while the circuit breaker was closed and connecting the system to any live current would cause destructive arcing for the internal components. Following testing and some in service incidents, modifications were made to the changeover equipment such that a switch to the low-voltage mode could only be made when the line voltage had dropped to below 3 kV and then risen to 4.1 kV, and that the reclosing of the circuit breaker is only made after a two-second wait following the detection of the second APC magnet to ensure a correct reading of the voltage.

As well as new EMUs introduced after 1960, the previous class 306 and 307 units originally built for the 1.5 kV DC system underwent conversion to become 6.25/25 kV dual-mode EMUs. The conversion of both these classes of train involved significant interventions particularly the relocating of the pantograph to a different carriage and the associated internal layout changes this caused. The full 92-unit fleet of class 306s and the 32 units of class 307 fleet underwent alterations at Stratford Works with new equipment provided by Associated Electrical Industries at Manchester.

Neutral sections are, or course, still required on the modern 25 kV system and APC magnets are still used to automatically trigger the opening of the train's circuit breaker so that an arc is not caused at OLE when the pantograph travels between live and earthed wire.

==== Feeding arrangements ====
The majority of the GEML network is electrified using the 'classic' feeding arrangement connected to the 132 kV distribution grid all controlled by UK Power Networks. In accordance with the Crossrail project, autotransformer feeding was fitted between the new autotransformer feeder station (ATFS) at Pudding Mill Lane and Gidea Park. Pudding Mill Lane ATFS also feeds the Crossrail core from that point to the Westbourne Park tunnel portal and towards Abbey Wood. This entirely replaced Crowlands classic feeder station (located between Chadwell Heath and Romford) and significantly reduced the load of the Bow Junction classic feeder station. The feeder station is connected to the National Grid 400 kV transmission substation also named Pudding Mill Lane.

The line between Gidea Park and Shenfield is fitted out to be converted to autotransformer feeding in the near future with a sectioning autotransformer station (SATS) already completed at Shenfield in 2018. Autotransformer feeding is also due to be extended as far as Beaulieu Park, as a new ATFS is being constructed just north of the station at the same site as the Springfield classic feeder station.

The original 1.5 kV DC system of 1949 used mercury arc powered traction substations at Bethnal Green (6 MW), Stratford (8 MW), Chadwell Heath (6 MW), Gidea Park (4 MW), and Shenfield (4 MW) all supplied by 33 kV three-phase AC distribution ring owned and operated by the railway. The 33 kV ring was itself supplied by the utility grid at Brentwood, Chadwell Heath (from Barking Power Station) and Crosswall (near Fenchurch Street) at 22 kV where it was stepped up to 33 kV. The line from Gas Factory Jcn was also electrified to Fenchurch Street and supplied by Crosswall substation (2 MW). The entire high voltage distribution system and the traction feeding system were controlled from Chadwell Heath in what was the biggest traction application in the UK. Beyond Shenfield, the DC system installed in 1956 to Chelmsford and Southend Victoria did not use the railway distribution lines but were connected directly to the public utility grid at 33 kV.

Between Liverpool Street and Shenfield, the DC substations were significantly altered but retained for the conversion to 6.25 kV in 1960 but were unsuitable for the further upgrades to 25 kV. So too were the 33 kV distribution lines which were reinforced by replacing the Crosswall grid connection with a stronger one at Bethnal Green. However, after 1960, the distribution lines no longer powered Shenfield substation as a new feeder station was built that could supply both 6.25 kV southwards and on the Southend line and 25 kV for the line north to Chelmsford and for the future upgrade.

From 1976 to 1980, the 6.25 kV lines between Liverpool Street and Southend Victoria were upgraded to 25 kV which required entirely new grid connections and substations. New feeder stations were installed at Crowlands and at Bow Junction. The substation at Gidea Park became the MPTSC between Shenfield and Crowlands, and a brand new MPTSC was installed at Manor Park to separate Crowlands and Bow Junction feeder stations. Bow Junction feeder station also supplied the WAML up to a new MPTSC at Hackney Downs by way of a new Spitalfields TSC around Bethnal Green junction.

List of traction substations on the Great Eastern Main Line
Mileage (Note: Measured in miles and chains (80 chains = 1 mile))	Substation	Type	In use	Neutral section	Grid Connection	Notes
(London Liverpool Street station: datum point for the line)
30 chains (0.60 km)	Liverpool Street	TSC (Note: Technically speaking, a TSC on a DC railway should be referred to as a Track Paralleling Hut (TPH), they are functionally similar. However, this table will call them TSC for simplicity with terminology for AC systems. In addition, the original documentation for the DC system used the term TSC.)	1949–1980	no	n/a	Converted in 1960 from 1.5 kV DC to 6.25 kV AC
1 mile 14 chains (1.9 km)	Spitalfields	TSC	since 1980	no	n/a	Allows Bow Junction "A" to feed the WAML that splits at Bethnal Green. Replaced Liverpool Street TSC
1 mile 22 chains (2.1 km)	Bethnal Green	FS	1949–1980	yes (from 1960)	Railway owned 33 kV ring	Converted in 1960 from 1.5 kV DC to 6.25 kV AC. Substation also fed WAML from 1960.
2 miles 68 chains (4.6 km)	Bow Junction	TSC	1949–1980	no	n/a	Converted in 1960 from 1.5 kV DC to 6.25 kV AC
3 miles 15 chains (5.1 km)	Bow Junction	FS	since 1980	yes (Note: Neutral sections at Bow FS were moved to 2 miles 70 chains (4.6 km) in 1995, and to 2 miles 68 chains (4.6 km) in 2015. 3 miles 15 chains (5.1 km) represents where the substation is approximately located)	UKPN 132 kV underground power line (Hackney Supergrid 132 to Bow 132)	Dual FS with "A" and "B" sides. Installed for 25 kV upgrade. Replaced Bethnal Green and Stratford FSs. Since 2022, the "B" side no longer feeds GEML but does supply North London Line and Temple Mills Branch via ducting to the Stratford area.
3 miles 31 chains (5.5 km)	Pudding Mill Lane	ATFS	since 2022	yes	Adjacent National Grid Pudding Mill Lane 400 kV transmission substation	Dual ATFS. "A" side powers Crossrail Central Operating Section, "B" side powers GEML replacing Bow Junction "B" FS.
4 miles 55 chains (7.5 km)	Stratford	FS	1949–1980	yes (from 1960)	Railway owned 33 kV ring	Converted in 1960 from 1.5 kV DC to 6.25 kV AC
5 miles 71 chains (9.5 km)	Manor Park	SATS	since 1980	yes	n/a	Installed for 25 kV upgrade. Acted as an MPTSC between Bow Junction "B" FS and Crowlands "A" FS until Pudding Mill Lane ATFS replaced both in 2022. Neutral section still in situ so this substation may still be in use in some.
8 miles 20 chains (13.3 km)	Ilford	SATS	since 1949	no	n/a	Installed originally as a TSC from 1949, converted to 6.25 kV in 1960, to 25 kV in 1980, and finally converted to a SATS by 2022.
10 miles 49 chains (17.1 km)	Chadwell Heath	FS	1949–1980	yes (from 1960)	Railway owned 33 kV ring	Converted in 1960 from 1.5 kV DC to 6.25 kV AC. Chadwell Heath was the location of the main grid connection for the railway's 33 kV ring.
11 miles 24 chains (18.2 km)	Crowlands	SATS	since 1980	yes	(1980–2022) UKPN 132 kV underground power line (Barking 132 kV to Crowlands Grid)	Originally Dual FS with "A" and "B" sides. Installed for 25 kV upgrade. Replaced Chadwell Heath FS and Gidea Park as an FS. The substation may have become a SATS from 2022 since the neutral section is still in situ.
14 miles 45 chains (23.4 km)	Gidea Park	MPATS/MPTSC	since 1949	yes (from 1960)	(1949–1980) Railway owned 33 kV ring (since 1980) n/a	Installed originally as an FS from 1949, converted to 6.25 kV in 1960. Converted into a MPTSC between Crowlands "B" and Shenfield "A" in 1980 and finally converted to a MPATS by 2022.
17 miles 1 chain (27.4 km)	Brook Street	MPTSC	1949–1976	yes (from 1960)	n/a	Originally as 1.5 kV TSC, converted to 6.25 kV MPTSC in 1960, substation removed in 1976.
19 miles 70 chains (32.0 km)	Shenfield [DC]	FS (DC)	1949–1960	no	Railway-owned 33 kV ring	Only ever a 1.5 kV DC feeder station. Replaced by the new Shenfield FS with 132 kV grid connection.
20 miles 72 chains (33.6 km)	Shenfield [new]	FS	since 1960	yes	UKPN 132 kV underground power line (Warley 132 kV Grid to Shenfield Grid)	Dual FS, originally capable of 6.25 kV and 25 kV operation until 1980 when it fed all lines at 25 kV. Since Springfield FS was introduced, normally only of two supplies is in use for the section Gidea Park to Shenfield. Substation is configured to feed the Southend line if needed. The site has been added to with a SATS since 2022 that is not yet in use.
23 miles 40 chains (37.8 km)	Ingatestone	TSC	1956–1960	no	n/a	1.5 kV DC TSC, removed when line was de-energised in 1960 for conversion to 25 kV AC by 1961
27 miles 15 chains (43.8 km)	Hylands	FS (DC)	1956–1960	no	unknown	1.5 kV DC FS, removed when line was de-energised in 1960 for conversion to 25 kV AC by 1961
29 miles 40 chains (47.5 km)	Chelmsford	TSC	since 1961	no	n/a	Installed 1961 for the 25 kV system
33 miles 6 chains (53.2 km)	Springfield	FS	since 1993	yes	UKPN 132 kV overhead powerline (Rayleigh Main 132 kV to Braintree 132 kV)	Dual FS installed ~30 years after this section was originally electrified. Due to soon become an ATFS
38 miles 12 chains (61.4 km)	Witham	TSC/MPTSC	since 1962	yes	n/a	Originally installed as an MPTSC between Shenfield and Colchester FSs. Since Springfield FS was introduced, Witham is probably switched through in normal operation.
43 miles 50 chains (70.2 km)	Hill House	MPTSC (?)	since 1962	yes (since 2011)	n/a	Originally installed as a TSC on the Colchester supply in 1962. A neutral section was added in 2011 likely to separate the Springfield "B" and (new) Hythe "A" supplies. Unknown if any switching ability exists at this substation.
52 miles 21 chains (84.1 km)	Colchester	MPTSC	since 1959	yes	1959–1993: yes (unknown) 1993–present: no	Originally installed as a dual FS. B side supplying the Clacton line (from 1959) and A side feeding the mainline to Witham in 1962. Colchester likely ceased being an FS in 1993 when Springfield FS on the mainline and Hythe FS (by 1989) on the Clacton line were installed. Currently it is a three way MPTSC distributing the incoming Hythe FS "A" supply to the mainline south to Hill House as well as terminating the supply from Manningtree FS to the north.
59 miles 47 chains (95.9 km)	Manningtree	FS	since 1985	yes	UKPN 132 kV overhead powerline (Cliff Quay grid to Lawford Grid)	The first single supply (tee feeding) FS on GEML only feeding southwards to Colchester. The substation also supplies the entirety of the Harwich line.
69 miles 42 chains (111.9 km)	Ipswich	TSC	since 1985	no	n/a	
79 miles 10 chains (127.3 km)	Stowmarket	FS	since 1986	yes	UKPN 132 kV overhead powerline (Bramford Grid to Bury [st Edmunds] Grid)	Dual supply FS
85 miles 24 chains (137.3 km)	Cow Green	TSC	since 1987	no	n/a	
91 miles 34 chains (147.1 km)	Mellis	TSC	since 1987	no	n/a	
98 miles 76 chains (159.2 km)	Hales Street	MPTSC	since 1987	yes	n/a	
106 miles 63 chains (171.9 km)	Flordon	TSC	since 1987	no	n/a	
123 miles 38 chains (198.7 km)	Norwich	FS	since 1987	no	UKPN 25 kV underground powerline to nereby Thorpe 132 kV Grid	Single supply FS
124 miles 9 chains (199.7 km)	[Norwich Station, end of line]					

== Rolling stock ==
=== Inter-city ===
Steam-hauled inter-city trains on the London-Norwich service were replaced by diesel power in the 1960s; locomotives from classes 31, 40, 37 and 47 hauled services until the mid-1980s.

Electric locomotives replaced diesel haulage from the mid-1980s, when the remainder of the GEML was electrified north of Colchester; their utilisation continued until March 2020. Class 86 locomotives powered the service from 1985 until 2005, (Note: Class 86s hauled services only as far as Ipswich between 1985 and 1987; Class 47s would continue to operate the Ipswich to Norwich section until electrification of this final stage was completed.) with rakes of Mark 2 coaches. Push-pull services were introduced during their tenure, initially using a DBSO coach at the Norwich end and latterly with Mark 3 Driving Van Trailers, cascaded from the West Coast Main Line. From 2004, Class 90 locomotives replaced the ageing Class 86s and rolling stock was updated with refurbished former West Coast Main Line Mark 3 coaches, following the introduction of the Class 390 Pendolino stock on that route.

By March 2020, new Class 745 EMUs had fully replaced Class 90 and Mark 3 coaches; thereby ending locomotive operation on the inter-city services on the Great Eastern Main Line.

=== Suburban ===
Electric multiple units are used for inner and outer suburban passenger trains and diesel multiple units are used on non-electrified branch lines. The main passenger units utilised are:

- Class 345: 450 seats across nine cars. (Note: Running in reduced seven car formation from 2017-2020.) Maximum speed 90 mph (140 km/h). Operated by Elizabeth line.
- Class 720: 545 seats across five cars. 100 mph (160 km/h)
- Class 745: 757 seats across 12 cars. Maximum speed 100 mph (160 km/h)
- Class 755: 167 seats across three cars (class 755/3) or 229 seats across four cars (class 755/4). Maximum speed 100 mph (160 km/h).

On weekends and when engineering work occurs, c2c run services into Liverpool Street via Stratford using Class 357 EMUs.

== Developments ==
=== Crossrail ===
In 2015, TfL Rail, the precursor of the Elizabeth line, took over operation of the Shenfield stopping "metro" service and, since 2022, the service runs via a tunnel through central London and links up with the Great Western Main Line to Reading and Heathrow Airport.

The first new Class 345 rolling stock entered service on the service on 22 June 2017. The new trains, built at Bombardier's Derby factory, provide air conditioned walk-through carriages, intelligent lighting and temperature control, closed-circuit television and passenger information displays showing travel information, including about onward journeys. It was planned that by September 2017, half of the services between Shenfield and Liverpool Street will have switched to the new Class 345 trains. From May 2015, TfL Rail services (rebranded in 2022 as the Elizabeth line) have an interchange with existing GEML services at Liverpool Street (via new underground platforms) as well as Stratford, Romford and Shenfield.

In November 2022, Elizabeth line services began to operate between Shenfield and London Paddington via Farringdon. However no services operate further than Paddington onto the likes of Heathrow Airport and Reading; instead, these services start from Abbey Wood, the Elizabeth line's south-east branch.

== Proposed developments ==
A new station is planned at Great Blakenham as part of the SnOasis development approximately halfway between Needham Market and Ipswich,

== Services ==
The majority of trains are operated by Greater Anglia, with the Elizabeth line operating the stopping services between Liverpool Street to Shenfield. A limited number of weekend (and when engineering work is planned) c2c services, operate on part of the line between Stratford and Liverpool Street.

=== Main line ===
Fast and semi-fast services utilise the main line between Liverpool Street and Shenfield. Branch lines diverge at Romford, Shenfield, Witham, Marks Tey, Colchester, Ipswich, Stowmarket and Norwich.

Additionally, a very limited number of main line services call at Ilford, Seven Kings and Gidea Park during early mornings and late nights, often for the convenience of train drivers who may be working from these locations.

Station	Borough	Branch lines
London Liverpool Street	City of London	
Stratford	Newham	
Romford	Havering	Romford–Upminster line
Shenfield	Brentwood	Shenfield–Southend line
Ingatestone	Brentwood	
Chelmsford	Chelmsford	
Hatfield Peverel	Braintree	
Witham	Braintree	Braintree branch line
Kelvedon	Braintree	
Marks Tey	Colchester	Gainsborough line
Colchester	Colchester	Sunshine Coast line
Manningtree	Tendring	Mayflower line
Ipswich	Ipswich	East Suffolk line; Felixstowe branch line
Needham Market (Note: Needham Market is not served by main line trains.)	Mid Suffolk	
Stowmarket	Mid Suffolk	Ipswich–Ely line
Diss	South Norfolk	
Norwich	Norwich	Wherry lines; Bittern line; Breckland line

=== Elizabeth line ===
Elizabeth line services operate from Heathrow Terminal 5 or London Paddington to Shenfield, via London Liverpool Street. Off-peak, there are eight trains per hour.

Station	Fare zone	Borough
London Liverpool Street	1	City of London
Stratford	2/3	Newham
Maryland	3	Newham
Forest Gate	3	Newham
Manor Park	3/4	Newham
Ilford	4	Redbridge
Seven Kings	4	Redbridge
Goodmayes	4	Redbridge
Chadwell Heath	5	Redbridge
Romford	6	Havering
Gidea Park	6	Havering
Harold Wood	6	Havering
Brentwood	9	Brentwood
Shenfield	C	Brentwood

== Passenger volume ==
These are the passenger usage statistics from the year beginning April 2002 to April 2013, and for those beginning April 2016 to April 2022:

Station usage
Station name	2002–03	2004–05	2005–06	2006–07	2007–08	2008–09	2009–10	2010–11	2011–12	2012–13	2013–14	2014–15	2015–16	2016–17	2017–18	2018–19	2019–20	2020–21	2021–22	2022–23	2023–24	2024–25
Norwich	2,351,236	2,421,607	2,527,760	2,711,910	3,449,930	3,568,618	3,496,082	3,749,474	3,911,508	4,126,012	4,139,820	4,071,502	4,048,984	4,111,338	4,156,020	4,250,834	4,041,818	967,650	3,213,504	3,963,948		
Diss	328,606	314,136	325,553	417,857	551,781	559,544	539,234	600,904	621,728	646,158	675,527	682,142	675,036	685,326	689,960	700,586	671,300	124,442	422,272	559,966		
Stowmarket	367,331	417,729	453,271	545,670	705,682	751,802	756,484	855,692	884,962	927,856	944,466	932,510	956,202	951,396	935,240	967,114	916,094	185,762	615,232	764,552		
Needham Market	12,014	16,237	25,472	37,074	43,987	52,782	58,054	67,056	77,554	85,078	91,358	92,418	88,242	91,706	100,648	102,320	100,754	33,484	79,196	94,148		
Ipswich	2,022,546	2,017,300	2,144,935	2,402,852	2,807,395	2,825,352	2,774,536	3,004,678	3,159,348	3,348,394	3,312,522	3,295,398	3,284,934	3,342,366	3,351,870	3,416,026	3,292,182	726,756	2,125,686	2,682,574		
Manningtree	574,633	719,792	707,782	865,217	910,384	833,888	799,776	890,624	983,054	1,093,178	1,154,294	1,169,288	1,124,876	1,068,642	1,078,502	1,106,204	1,068,816	200,350	634,684	783,130		
Colchester	4,005,869	4,305,315	4,287,601	4,337,926	4,516,616	4,502,739	4,218,622	4,362,914	4,584,110	4,291,055	4,402,045	4,457,306	4,460,848	4,475,581	4,378,743	4,453,178	4,249,444	1,029,176	2,913,266	3,392,742		
Marks Tey	364,979	384,337	400,155	432,073	459,980	443,724	428,804	428,816	437,006	473,162	494,998	503,540	523,218	557,456	577,548	604,902	606,914	112,616	302,470	401,950		
Kelvedon	789,487	774,972	759,680	787,033	799,439	797,236	763,240	791,312	827,358	812,610	837,236	854,088	878,096	865,706	844,570	847,748	797,650	119,948	355,632	482,106		
Witham	2,173,543	2,261,186	2,307,269	2,342,618	2,341,123	2,277,436	2,076,532	2,159,09	2,251,940	2,244,774	2,349,736	2,380,266	2,377,010	2,343,972	2,331,628	2,349,496	2,299,342	479,098	1,277,154	1,617,780		
Hatfield Peverel	419,144	418,145	412,523	416,083	398,255	394,420	357,382	357,458	389,284	399,602	408,896	415,214	412,530	411,574	419,264	427,276	425,046	77,692	223,884	287,396		
Chelmsford	6,445,365	6,698,243	6,801,193	7,113,065	7,447,696	7,375,452	6,934,970	7,335,952	7,876,686	8,002,126	8,286,879	8,381,166	8,488,146	8,536,968	8,619,942	8,926,576	8,606,294	1,716,828	4,595,710	5,784,584		
Ingatestone	554,235	606,007	628,220	630,362	649,324	637,918	596,310	636,170	694,754	715,974	750,746	759,626	781,838	836,418	875,874	923,050	875,070	241,694	623,658	682,790		
Shenfield	2,701,210	2,861,253	2,907,917	2,965,886	3,024,519	3,008,422	2,825,598	2,936,428	2,991,100	3,131,298	3,314,120	3,486,772	3,689,850	3,746,572	3,872,484	4,149,488	4,170,558	1,063,094	2,863,920	5,105,512		
Brentwood	2,361,639	2,475,272	2,535,139	2,479,150	2,520,143	2,557,092	2,322,842	2,420,930	2,495,480	2,701,998	2,809,578	2,871,330	2,818,560	2,883,890	2,992,072	3,210,516	3,132,758	834,604	1,860,822	2,849,612		
Harold Wood	1,879,400	1,770,874	1,773,086	3,014,836	3,476,002	3,042,946	2,808,636	2,552,716	2,580,280	2,857,572	2,917,788	3,140,072	2,929,974	2,973,440	2,929,720	3,088,968	3,064,280	964,088	1,998,062	3,269,054		
Gidea Park	1,838,172	1,689,192	1,670,663	2,703,604	3,172,538	2,587,398	2,401,226	2,467,414	2,524,448	2,587,142	2,810,806	2,944,838	2,860,546	2,797,104	2,711,136	2,833,972	2,872,264	752,520	1,683,656	2,804,592		
Romford	5,208,851	5,118,900	4,823,860	7,363,378	8,372,672	7,310,172	6,736,060	6,817,246	6,998,872	7,445,556	8,265,442	8,946,522	9,040,996	8,833,544	8,702,770	9,180,976	9,382,408	3,133,122	6,286,654	11,603,078		
Chadwell Heath	1,836,872	1,607,729	1,556,568	2,208,567	2,352,716	2,246,672	1,977,616	2,144,996	2,228,662	2,346,218	2,686,904	3,006,994	3,673,514	3,883,758	3,755,174	3,973,098	4,054,746	1,510,058	2,745,800	4,500,098		
Goodmayes	1,472,318	1,155,770	1,070,419	1,961,690	2,092,464	1,929,478	1,792,694	2,069,248	2,306,452	2,389,588	2,625,572	2,832,750	3,780,726	3,845,200	3,544,810	3,498,332	3,653,340	1,386,934	2,469,574	4,131,424		
Seven Kings	1,694,399	1,174,319	1,095,940	1,567,157	1,764,774	1,657,658	1,528,296	1,708,550	1,879,664	2,112,832	2,330,778	2,423,964	3,126,372	3,099,284	2,959,784	3,167,632	3,157,300	1,286,182	2,317,224	3,781,774		
Ilford	3,679,035	2,931,960	2,623,618	5,075,338	6,119,745	5,559,414	5,363,400	6,286,174	6,721,496	6,854,314	7,632,352	8,022,488	8,199,216	8,121,754	7,679,264	7,942,174	7,793,746	2,536,166	4,754,530	8,750,562		
Manor Park	875,206	694,315	656,895	1,291,690	1,443,311	1,232,484	1,160,120	1,424,914	1,593,348	1,659,972	1,809,714	1,848,578	2,788,910	2,373,788	1,601,080	1,700,818	2,367,478	1,010,452	1,976,616	3,719,684		
Forest Gate	1,209,066	956,231	915,549	1,891,875	2,037,387	1,706,018	1,598,816	1,914,054	2,205,106	2,403,326	2,647,058	2,786,448	3,846,734	3,207,020	2,834,734	2,980,888	3,354,698	1,424,074	2,675,098	4,883,572		
Maryland	265,274	197,259	196,927	450,314	503,987	431,350	425,176	501,956	541,942	699,584	939,324	965,076	1,475,574	1,250,086	1,145,878	1,254,204	1,330,978	638,676	1,429,510	2,788,146		
Stratford	2,597,390	7,914,419	7,699,178	13,089,922	13,368,783	12,303,033	12,370,245	17,479,020	21,797,460	25,564,250	26,377,506	30,974,204	41,113,260	42,251,592	40,077,082	41,206,226	41,912,114	13,985,162	28,182,238	44,136,784		
London Liverpool Street	38,968,814	50,469,209	47,271,234	55,265,748	57,759,809	55,103,416	51,596,155	55,769,423	57,105,400	58,448,814	63,004,002	63,631,246	66,556,690	67,339,218	66,965,956	69,482,532	65,984,786	11,212,008	32,165,310	80,448,194		
The annual passenger usage is based on sales of tickets in stated financial years from Office of Rail and Road estimates of station usage. The statistics are for passengers arriving and departing from each station and cover twelve-month periods that start in April. Methodology may vary year on year. Usage since the period 2019–20 have been affected by the COVID-19 pandemic, especially the period 2020–23.
