= Hatfield Peverel railway station =

Railway station in Essex, England

Coordinates: 51°46′47.09″N 0°35′30.31″E

Hatfield Peverel
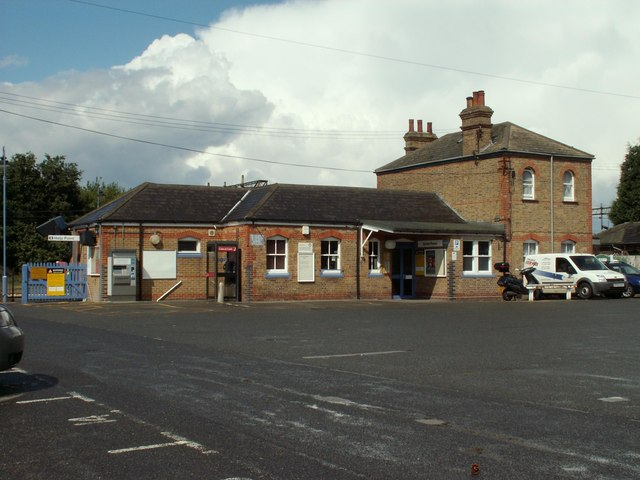
- Hatfield Peverel railway station building in 2006

General information
- Location: Hatfield Peverel, Braintree; England
- Grid reference: TL788122
- Managed by: Greater Anglia
- Platforms: 2

Other information
- Station code: HAP
- Classification: DfT category D

Key dates
- 1844: Opened as Hatfield Peverel
- 1849: Closed
- 1878: Reopened as Hatfield Peveril
- 1880: Renamed Hatfield Peverel
- 27 June 1960: Closed to goods

Passengers
- 2020/21: ▼77,692
- 2021/22: ▲0.224 million
- 2022/23: ▲0.287 million
- 2023/24: ▲0.325 million
- 2024/25: ▲0.362 million
Location
Notes
- Passenger statistics from the Office of Rail and Road

Hatfield Peverel railway station is on the Great Eastern Main Line in the East of England, serving the villages of Hatfield Peverel and Nounsley, Essex. It is 35 miles 74 chains (57.8 km) down the line from London Liverpool Street and is situated between Beaulieu Park to the west and Witham and to the east. Its three-letter station code is HAP.

The station is managed by Greater Anglia, which also operates all trains serving it, as part of the East Anglia franchise.

== History ==
The original Hatfield Peverel station was opened in late 1844 but was destroyed by fire in early 1849. It was later re-built on the current site and opened in 1878, known as Hatfield Peveril until the spelling was amended in 1880. There was a private station just to the west for Boreham House between 1843 and 1877.

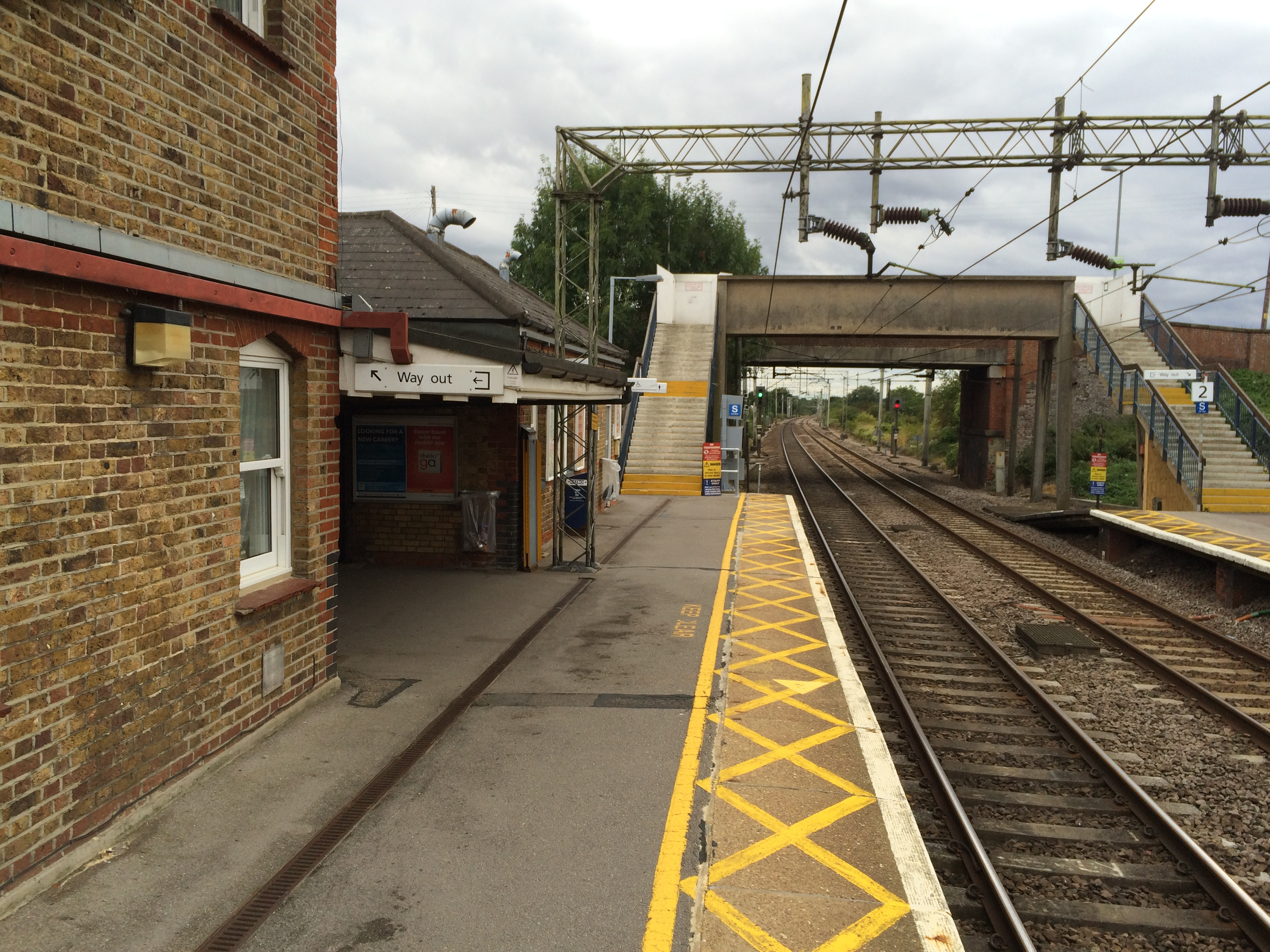
Platform one at Hatfield Peverel

An 1897 plan of the station shows two goods sidings on the up-side at the London end and a further siding at the country end also on the up-side. There was a refuge siding added at a later date on the down-side at the London end.

Goods traffic was ended on 27 June 1960.

== Services ==
The following services typically call at Hatfield Peverel during off-peak hours:

Operator	Route	Rolling stock	Frequency	Notes
Greater Anglia	London Liverpool Street - Stratford - Shenfield - Chelmsford - Beaulieu Park - Hatfield Peverel - Witham - Kelvedon - Marks Tey - Colchester - Manningtree - Ipswich	Class 720	1x per hour in each direction	Also calls at Ingatestone on Sundays

At peak times service frequencies may be increased and calling patterns varied.

Preceding station	National Rail	Following station
Beaulieu Park	Greater Anglia Great Eastern Main Line	Witham
