= Beaulieu Park railway station =

Railway station in Essex, England

Beaulieu Park
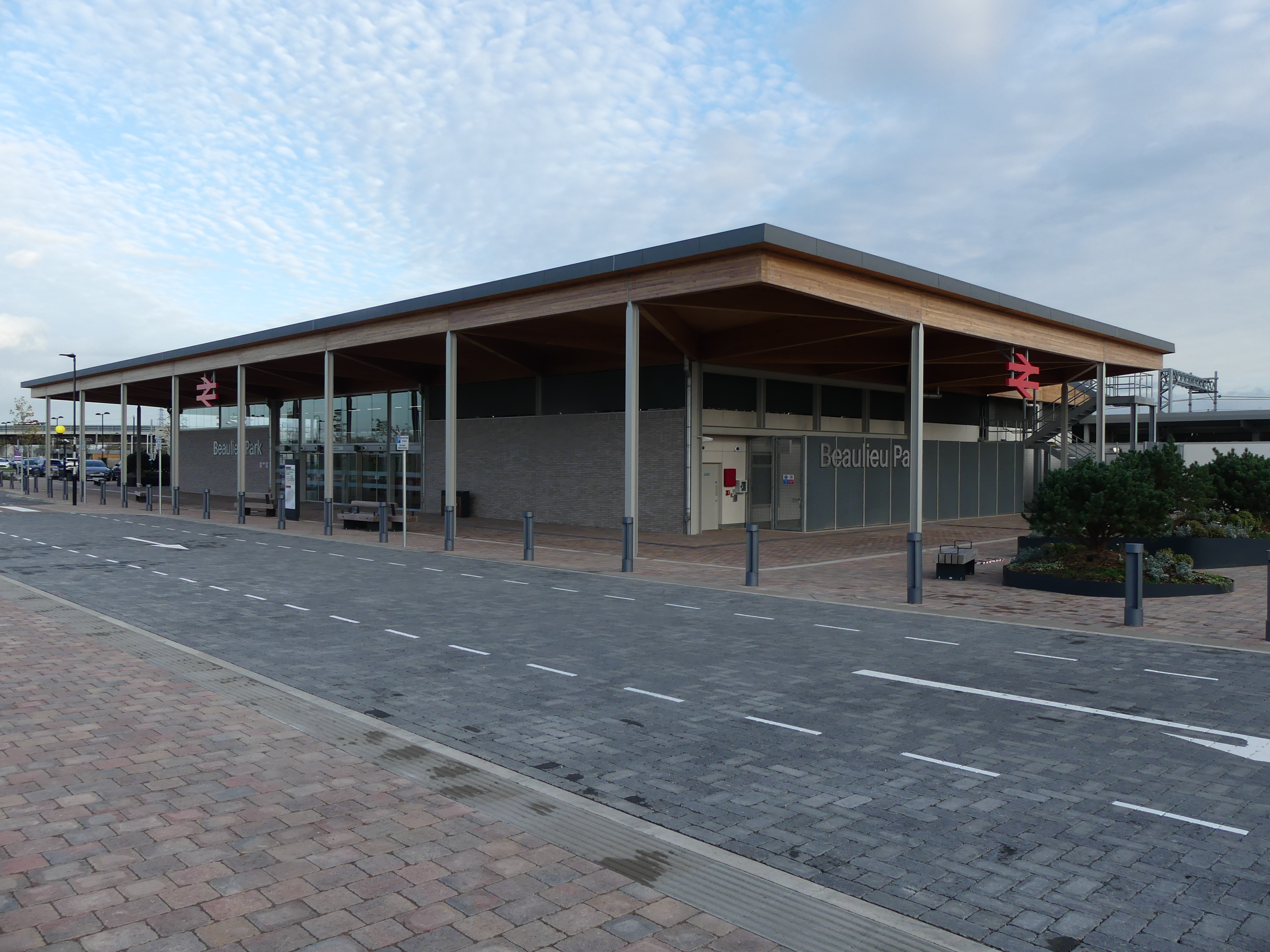
- Station entrance

General information
- Location: Boreham, City of Chelmsford; England
- Coordinates: 51.7574°N 0.5187°E
- Manager: Greater Anglia
- Platforms: 3

Other information
- Station code: BPA

Key dates
- March 2023: Construction started
- 26 October 2025: Opened

Passengers
- 2025/26: 0.301 million
Location
Notes
- Passenger statistics from the Office of Rail and Road

Beaulieu Park railway station (/ˈbjuːli/ BEW-lee) is a railway station on the Great Eastern Main Line in the East of England. It serves the Beaulieu Park housing development in Boreham, approximately 3 miles (5 km) to the north-east of Chelmsford, Essex. The station is between Chelmsford to the west and Hatfield Peverel to the east.

The station was suggested as early as the 1980s, but construction work did not start until 2023. It opened on 26 October 2025, becoming the first new station on the Great Eastern Main Line in 100 years. It is managed by Greater Anglia, which also operates all trains serving the station.

== History ==
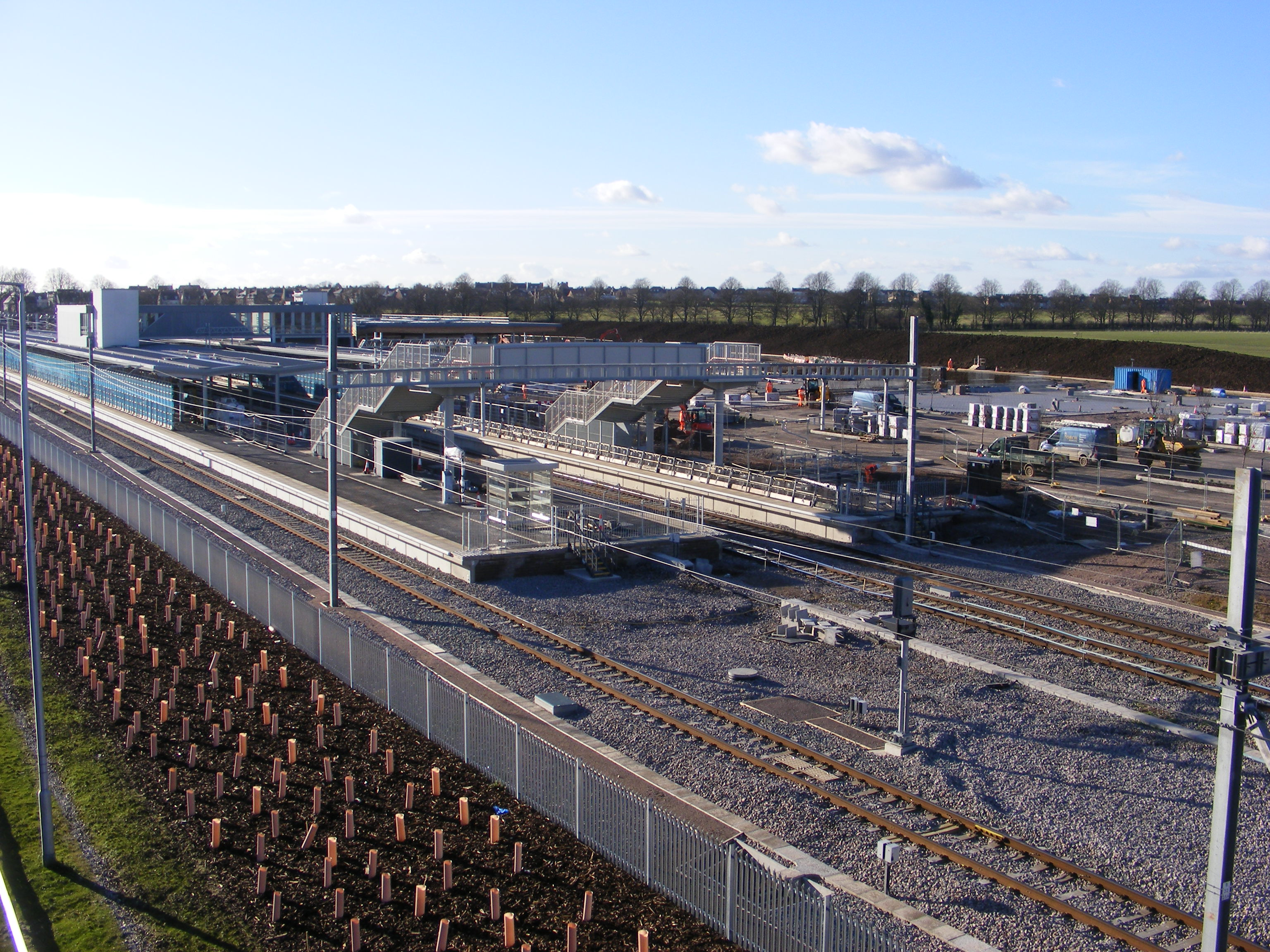
The station under construction in January 2025

Plans for Chelmsford's second station were rumoured in the 1990s, although passengers have been waiting for it since the 1980s. The new station was part of Chelmsford's Local Plan in 2003; however, the Local Plan was withdrawn that year and the station re-entered the planning stage five years later. The planning application was then submitted in 2010.

In September 2013, it was reported that the station would cost £53 million. In March 2014, Countryside, a UK housebuilding company, agreed to fund the railway station and 3,600 new homes north-east of Chelmsford. In October 2013, the leader of Braintree Council believed that the station "could open by 2019", though this never came to fruition.

In 2015, an agreement was signed between Essex County Council, Chelmsford City Council, Network Rail and Countryside to work on the delivery of the new station. In August 2019, the then Chancellor of the Exchequer, Sajid Javid, agreed to allocate £218 million from the Housing Infrastructure Fund for the new station and associated road improvements, with the aim of building up to 14,000 new homes.

Essex County Council agreed on the next stage of the planning of Beaulieu Park station in December 2021. Plans were approved in June 2022 after Essex County Council agreed on the design and layout of the station. After J. Murphy & Sons was awarded the first contract in January 2023, construction began in March. In September 2023, Murphy was awarded the second of two construction contracts from Network Rail.

The station was originally planned to open at the end of 2025 or 2026. Several bus routes were extended to serve the new station. As part of constructing the new station, Murphy laid 5,156 m (3.2 miles) of new rail, reused 1,768 m (1.1 miles) of rail, 14 new railway signals and 36.5 km (22.7 miles) of new overhead line equipment. It opened ahead of schedule on 26 October 2025, at a cost of £175 million. It was the first new station on the Great Eastern Main Line in over 100 years.

This station was built as part of Chelmsford's housing development. It also serves Springfield and Boreham, easing pressure at Chelmsford's main station.

As part of Project Oval, contactless payments to and from the station was originally planned to be launched from 14 December 2025. This was delayed to 8 March 2026, alongside 19 other Greater Anglia stations, due to issues found during testing.

Over 800,000 passenger journey were made to and from Beaulieu Park in its first 12 months of operation, more than double the pre-opening projections of 290,000–390,000 journeys.

== Facilities ==
The station has accessible toilets, waiting rooms and two footbridges (of which one has step-free access) connecting three 250 m (820 ft) platforms. The layout allows fast trains to use the central loop to overtake the stopping service. There is room for around 800 cars in two separate car parks, with 500 spaces for bicycles and a bus interchange.

The main station building has a brick-clad structure, underneath a larch glulam canopy supported on independent pillars. The National Rail logo hangs from the canopy and the station's name is in large metal lettering. The ticket hall has free-standing retail units, a ticket gate line and a row of ticket machines, but does not have a ticket office.

== Services ==
The typical off-peak service in trains per hour (tph) is:

- 2 tph to London Liverpool Street
- 1 tph to Ipswich
- 1 tph to Colchester Town.

Additional services, including trains to and from Clacton-on-Sea and Braintree, call at the station during peak hours. The station is located 40 minutes from London.

Preceding station	National Rail	Following station
Chelmsford	Greater Anglia Great Eastern Main Line	Hatfield Peverel
