= Chelmsford railway station =

Railway station in Essex, England

Coordinates: 51°44′10.97″N 0°28′07.74″E

Chelmsford
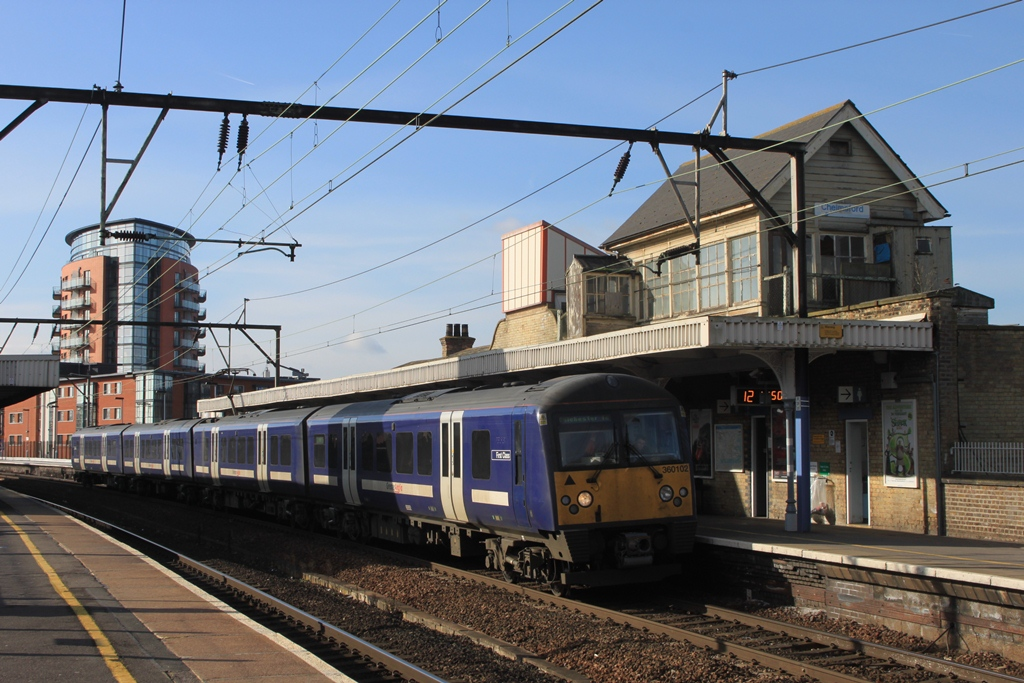
- Chelmsford railway station, including its disused signal box above the platform canopy

General information
- Location: Chelmsford, Essex; England
- Grid reference: TL705070
- Managed by: Greater Anglia
- Platforms: 2

Other information
- Station code: CHM
- Classification: DfT category C1

History
- Opened: 1843

Passengers
- 2020/21: ▼1.717 million
- Interchange: ▼10,518
- 2021/22: ▲4.596 million
- Interchange: ▲31,390
- 2022/23: ▲5.785 million
- Interchange: ▲43,397
- 2023/24: ▲6.538 million
- Interchange: ▼29,258
- 2024/25: ▲7.030 million
- Interchange: ▲77,269
Location
Notes
- Passenger statistics from the Office of Rail and Road

Chelmsford railway station serves the city of Chelmsford, Essex, in the East of England. It is on the Great Eastern Main Line, 29 miles 60 chains (47.9 km) from London Liverpool Street, between Ingatestone to the west and Beaulieu Park to the east.

The station is managed by Greater Anglia, which also operates all trains serving it as part of the East Anglia franchise. Westbound trains terminate at Liverpool Street and eastbound trains run to Braintree, Clacton-on-Sea, Colchester Town, Ipswich and Norwich.

== History ==
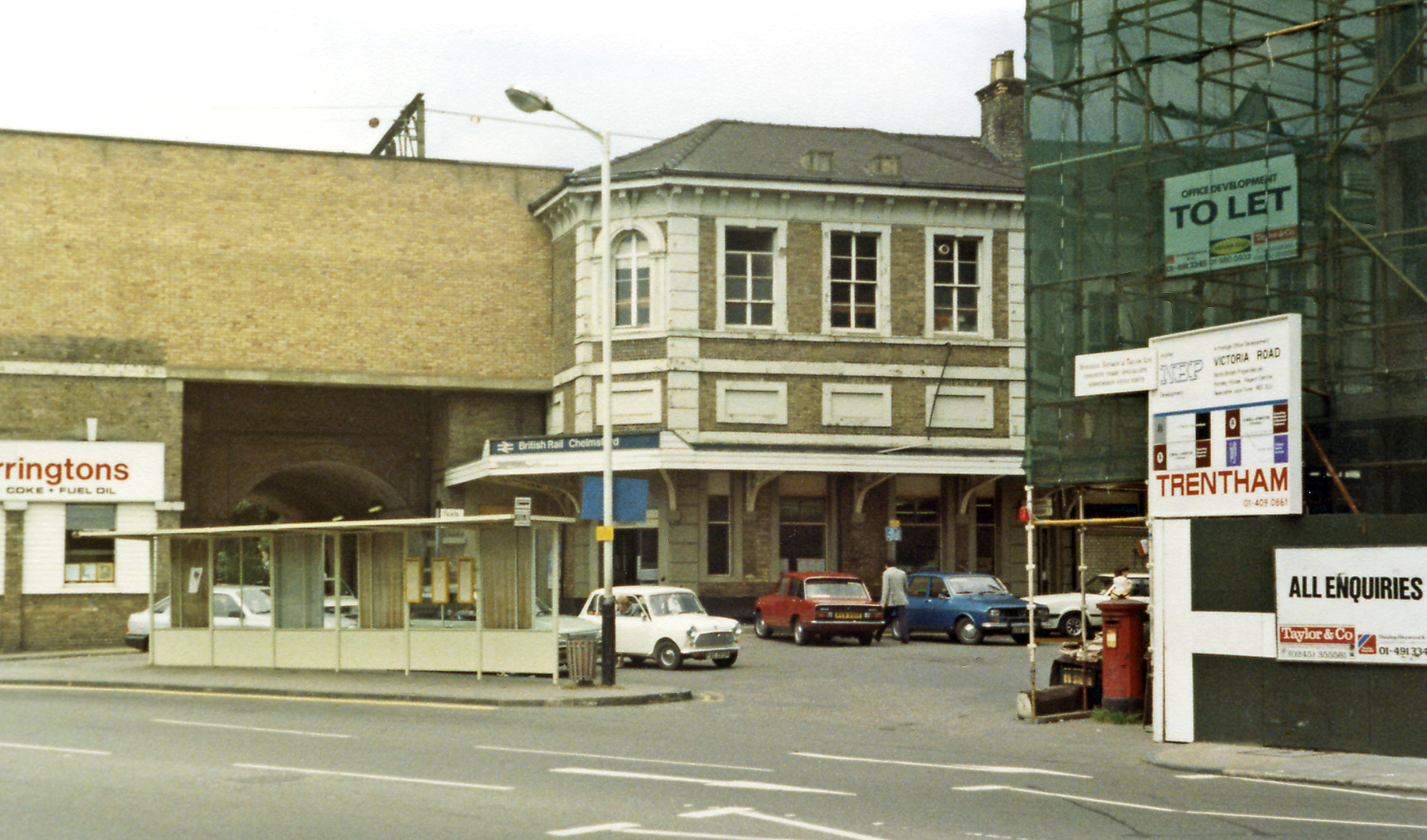
Street-level entrance to the station in 1984

When the Eastern Counties Railway (ECR) opened the line between Brentwood and Colchester in 1843, the geography of Chelmsford meant that an 18-arch viaduct had to be built across what is now the city's Central Park.

The first Chelmsford station was built slightly to the north of its current site. A three-storey building on today's site was constructed in 1885 by the Great Eastern Railway (GER), into which the ECR had been merged. The present station building dates from a rebuild in 1985 and a further rebuild, completed in 2016, which saw the main concourse and ticket office rebuilt and a new staircase added to serve the London-bound platform, to replace the original flying staircases installed as part of the 1985 rebuild. Since the railway is elevated on a viaduct, the platforms are above street-level.

On 2 March 1907, there was a collision between an up passenger express and a wagon left on the running line during shunting operations. There were no injuries and, although the wagon was destroyed, the locomotive stayed on the tracks, suffering minor damage.

In 1923, the London and North Eastern Railway took over operation of Chelmsford station and, following nationalisation of the railways in 1948, Chelmsford station came under the management of British Railways Eastern Region. Upon railway sectorisation in the 1980s, the station and its operations came under the Network SouthEast brand until the privatisation of British Rail.

There were originally three lines through the station: two platform lines and an avoiding line between them. An unusual signal box (being some five storeys high at the rear) on the London-bound platform controlled the station including, at the eastern end, a set of sidings that served the goods yard and Hoffman ball bearing factory. The signal box ceased to be used in 1994, but the structure has remained in situ since. The avoiding line has been removed and the sidings were reduced to serve only a mail sorting office and building materials yard. The mail platform has been out of use for many years but the sidings saw some intermittent use until 2014, when they were closed for relaying. Lines to the north of the station are used by limited early-morning services that start from Chelmsford running to London and limited late-evening trains from London that terminate at Chelmsford.

The station was extensively refurbished between 2014 and 2016 and included a new larger ticket hall, a new ticket office, new ticket barriers, modernised seating and two waiting rooms. The forecourt was also repaved and new bus shelters were added with real-time information boards.

== Services ==
The typical Monday-Saturday off-peak service consists of:

- 5 trains per hour (tph) to London Liverpool Street
- 1 tph to Braintree
- 1 tph to Clacton-on-Sea
- 1 tph to Colchester Town
- 1 tph to Ipswich
- 1 tph to Norwich

The Sunday service consists of:

- 2 tph to London Liverpool Street
- 1 tph to Clacton-on-Sea
- 1 tph to Ipswich

Preceding station	National Rail	Following station
Stratford	Greater Anglia Great Eastern Main Line; Inter-city services	Colchester
Ingatestone	Greater Anglia Great Eastern Main Line; Suburban services	Beaulieu Park
Historical railways
Ingatestone	Anglia Railways London Crosslink	Witham
