= Ingatestone railway station =

Railway station in Essex, England

Coordinates: 51°40′01.03″N 0°23′02.33″E

Ingatestone
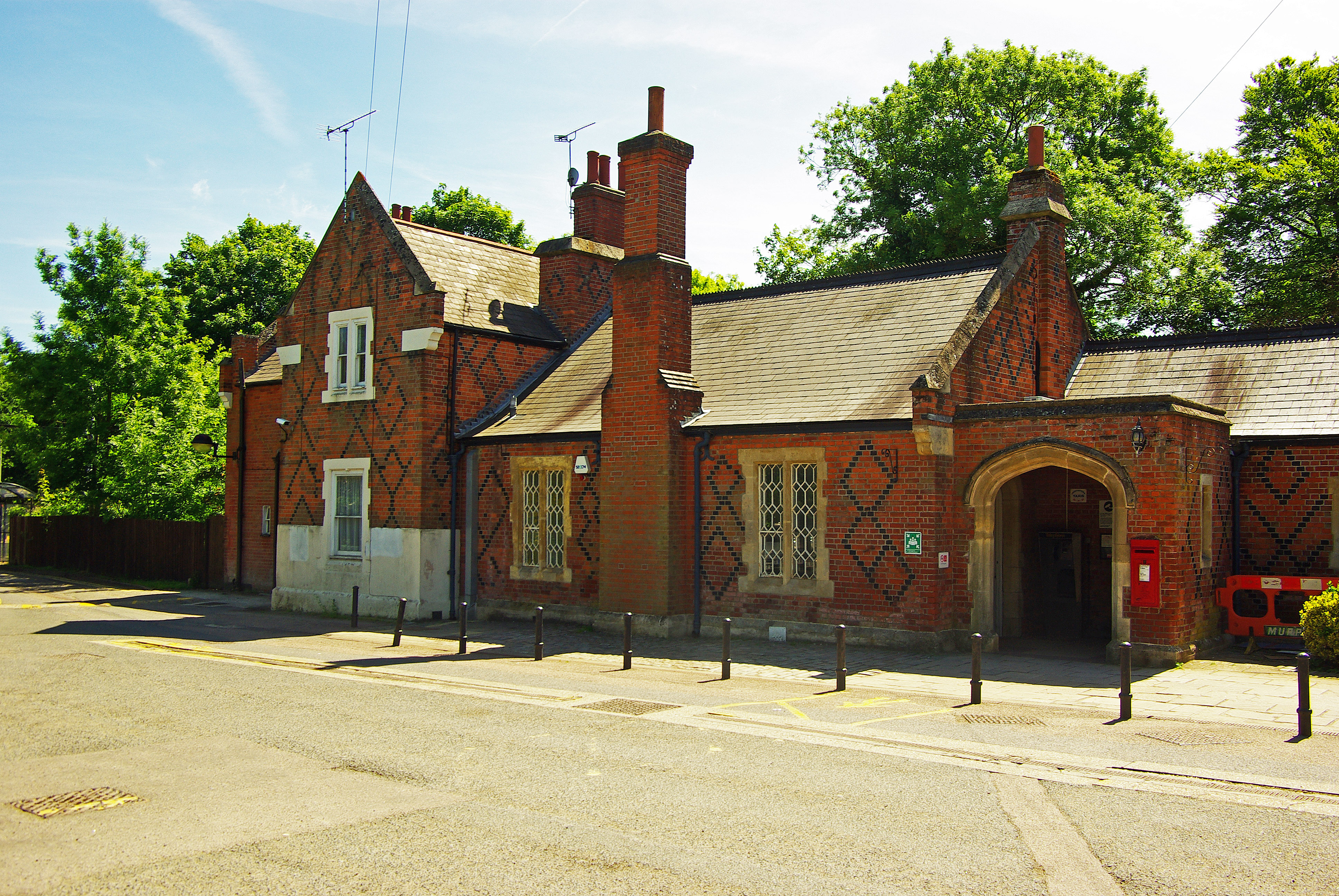
- The Grade II listed station building in 2013

General information
- Location: Ingatestone, Brentwood; England
- Grid reference: TQ649991
- Managed by: Greater Anglia
- Platforms: 2

Other information
- Station code: INT
- Classification: DfT category D

Passengers
- 2020/21: ▼0.242 million
- 2021/22: ▲0.624 million
- 2022/23: ▲0.683 million
- 2023/24: ▲0.728 million
- 2024/25: ▲0.779 million
Location
Notes
- Passenger statistics from the Office of Rail and Road

Ingatestone railway station serves the village of Ingatestone, Essex, in the East of England. It is on the Great Eastern Main Line, 23 miles 50 chains (38.0 km) from London Liverpool Street and is between Shenfield to the west and Chelmsford to the east. The station is managed by Greater Anglia, which also operates all trains serving it, as part of the East Anglia franchise. Its three-letter station code is INT.

== History ==
The first station at Ingatestone was opened by the Eastern Counties Railway (ECR) in July 1843, sited just below Stock Lane, and operated for less than a month. The station consisted of wooden platforms on each side of the railway, connecting to the road carried above by wooden steps up the embankment.

However, the agreement for the construction of the railway across the Petre Estate, obtained in 1836, and section 7 of the enabling local Act of Parliament, the Eastern Counties Railway Act 1838 (An Act to amend and enlarge the powers and provisions of the Act relating to the Eastern Counties Railway, 1 & 2 Vict. c.lxxxi) both required that the Petre Estate consent to the construction of any station on the estate.

The railway obtained consent for the construction of a station adjacent to Old Hall Lane (now Station Lane), adjacent to the level crossing, subsequently the site of the existing station. Despite this, in August 1842, the railway requested permission to relocate the station to the cutting adjacent to the Stock Lane bridge, a change that Lord Petre refused to agree. Despite this, a station was constructed on the alternative site and opened on 22 July 1843 for services between Shoreditch in London and Colchester.

VII. Provided always, and be it further enacted, That no Road, Wharf, Yard, Engine, Station, Loading or Unloading Place, Warehouse, Toll House, Building, Machine or Machinery, nor other Erection, shall at any Time or Times hereafter be made or erected by the said Company on any Part of the Estate of the said Lord Peter, nor within One Mile of the Mansion House of Thorndon Hall or of the Mansion House of Ingatestone Hall, except with the Consent of the said Lord Petre or other Owner or Owners thereof, and except at or near Brentwood adjoining the public Road leading from Brentwood to Ingrave on the North-west Side of the Line of the said Railway, where a Station may be made.

Following the legal case of Lord Petre v Eastern Counties Railway Company in August 1843, an injunction was issued by the High Court prohibiting use of the Stock Lane station. As a result, a permanent station on the present site was opened in 1844 and certainly given the present main station building, in Tudor style with diaper brickwork, in 1846. The up-side buildings (largely not in railway use for some years, but restored as a station café, with grant aid from the Railway Heritage Trust, in 2017) were provided by the Great Eastern Railway (GER) in 1885 to a domestic revival design by W. N. Ashbee.

Ingatestone station, and the area around it, form one of the first conservation areas to be designated in Essex. The station is a Grade II listed building.

In 2025, a blue plaque was unveiled at the station in honour of Dorothy Wadham, the founder of Wadham College, Oxford, who grew up nearby.

== Services ==
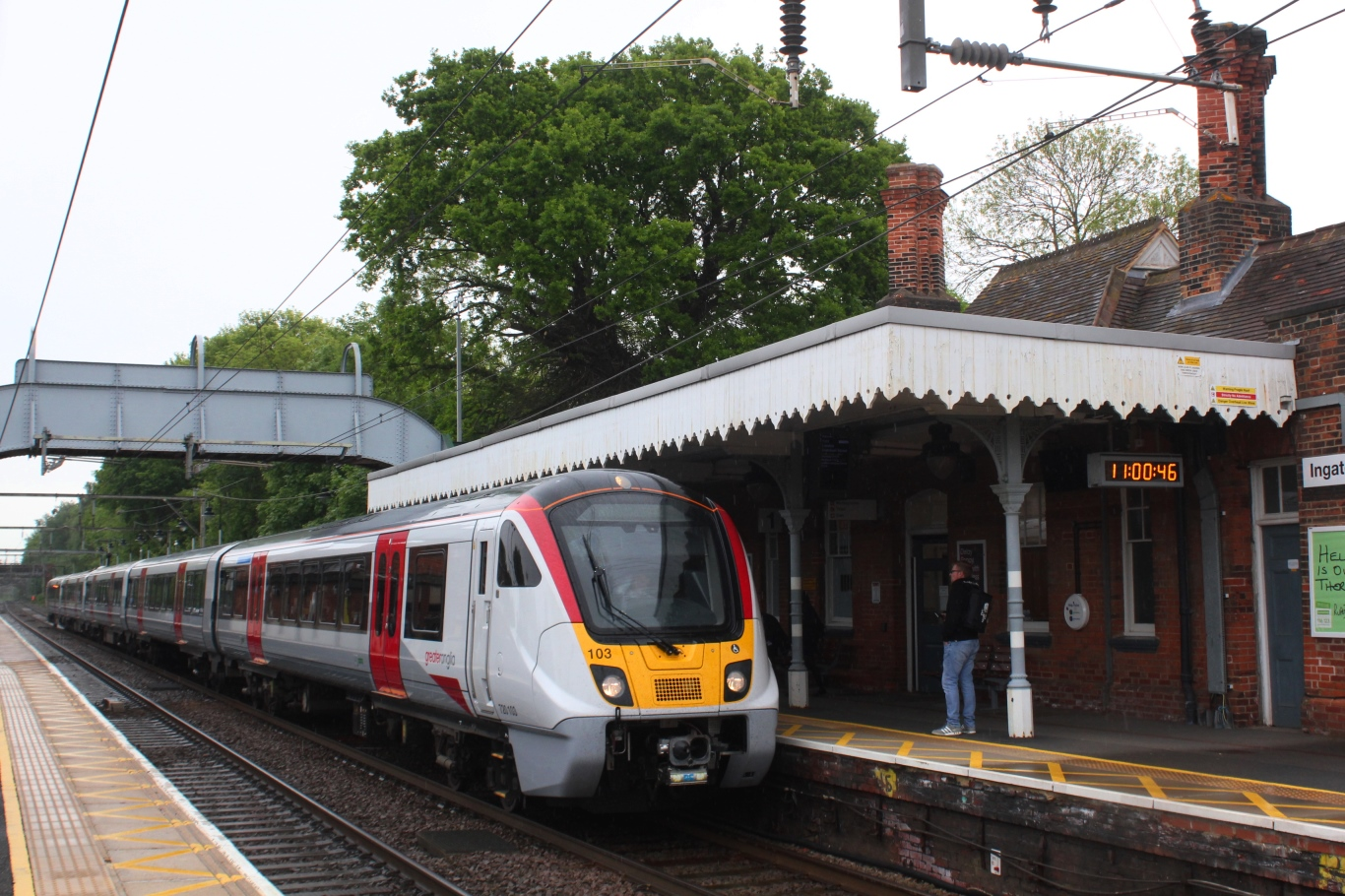
A train bound for London Liverpool Street in 2023

Services are operated by Greater Anglia. The typical off-peak Monday-Saturday service is two trains per hour west to London Liverpool Street, one per hour east to Clacton-on-Sea and one per hour east to Braintree. On Sundays, there is one train per hour west to London Liverpool Street and one east to Ipswich.

Preceding station	National Rail	Following station
Shenfield	Greater Anglia Great Eastern Main Line	Chelmsford
Historical railways
Romford	Anglia Railways London Crosslink	Chelmsford
