= Brentwood railway station =

Railway station in Essex, England

Brentwood
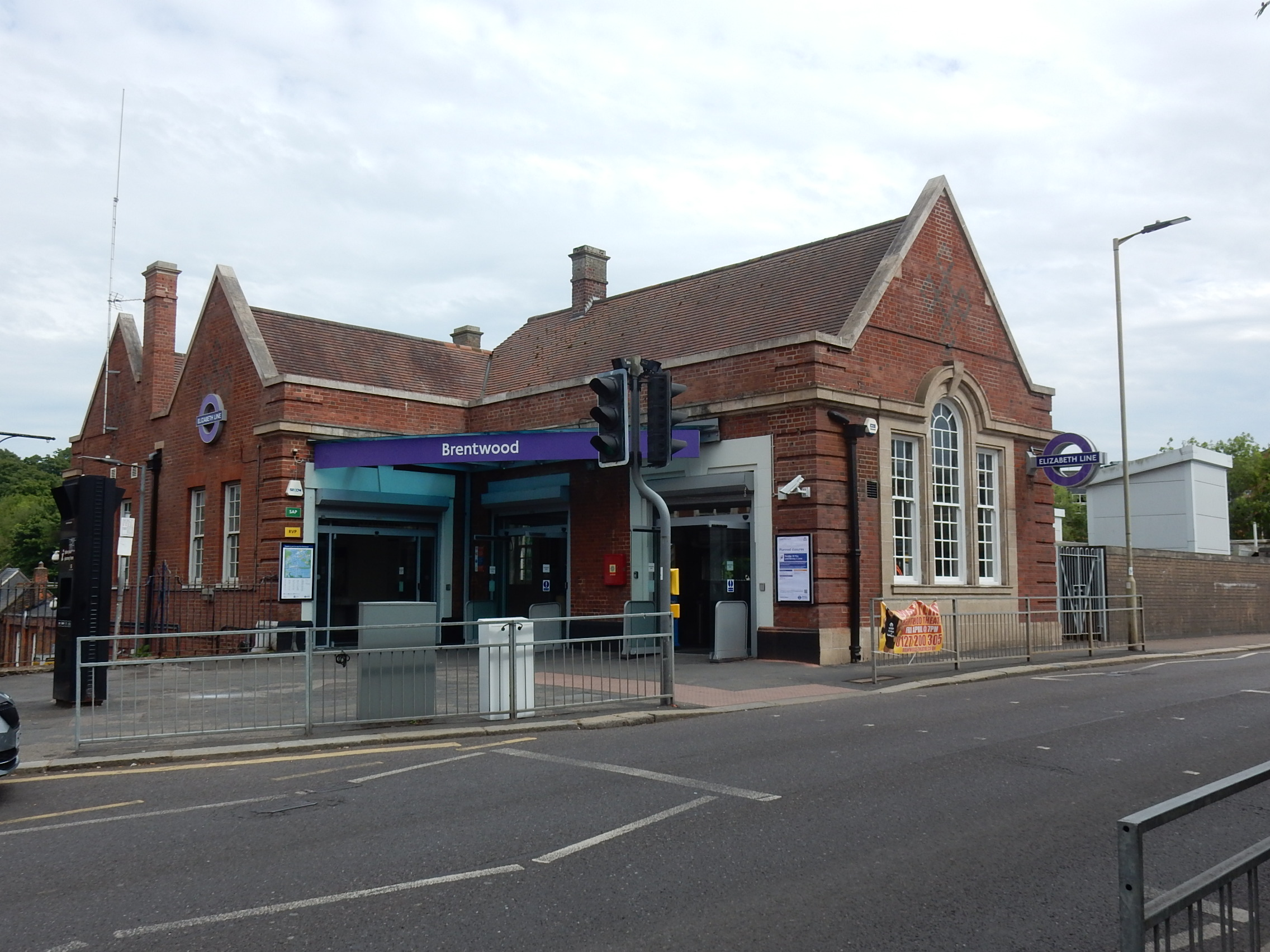
- Station entrance seen in June 2022
- Interactive map of Brentwood

General information
- Location: Brentwood
- Local authority: Borough of Brentwood
- Grid reference: TQ593930
- Managed by: Elizabeth line
- Owner: Network Rail
- Station code: BRE
- Number of platforms: 4
- Accessible: Yes
- Fare zone: 9

National Rail annual entry and exit
- 2020–21: ▼0.835 million
- 2021–22: ▲1.861 million
- 2022–23: ▲2.850 million
- 2023–24: ▲3.713 million
- 2024–25: ▼3.232 million

Railway companies
- Original company: Eastern Counties Railway
- Pre-grouping: Great Eastern Railway
- Post-grouping: London and North Eastern Railway

Key dates
- 1 July 1840: Opened as Brentwood
- 1 November 1882: Renamed Brentwood & Warley for Billericay
- 1 January 1889: Renamed Brentwood & Warley
- 20 February 1969: Renamed Brentwood

Other information
- External links: Departures; Facilities
- Coordinates: 51.61361°N 0.30000°E

Brentwood railway station is on the Great Eastern Main Line in the East of England, serving the Essex town of Brentwood. It is 18 miles 16 chains (29.3 km) down the line from London Liverpool Street and is situated between Harold Wood and Shenfield; it is in London fare zone 9. The station is currently managed and served by the Elizabeth line.

== History ==
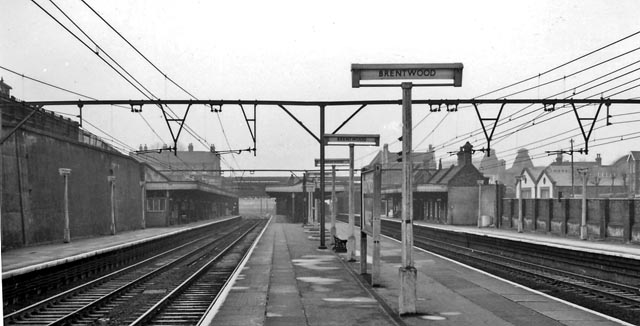
View of Brentwood & Warley station in 1961

=== Eastern Counties Railways (1840–1862) ===
Brentwood station was opened on 1 July 1840 as a temporary terminus by the Eastern Counties Railway (ECR) on what was to become the Great Eastern Main Line, until 1843, when the line was extended towards Colchester. From opening, a small railway turntable was provided and, by 1845, as the size of locomotives grew a larger turntable was provided. As it is located at the bottom of a steep incline, locomotives were allocated at Brentwood to assist trains get up the bank; by 1868, the turntable was enlarged. A three-track engine shed located at the London-end of the station behind the then London-bound platform of the two-platform station.

Initially provided with temporary wooden buildings, substantial brick buildings were provided on the London side in 1842; these included a tower and a bell sounded when trains departed.

A north-facing siding behind the London-bound platform was provided for traffic to the nearby Warley Barracks.

By the 1860s, the railways in East Anglia were in financial trouble and most were leased to the ECR; they wished to amalgamate formally, but could not obtain government agreement for this until 1862, when the Great Eastern Railway was formed by amalgamation.

=== Great Eastern Railway (1862–1922) ===
The Great Eastern Railway (GER) took over operation in 1862 and renamed the station Brentwood & Warley for Billericay in 1882; it was shortened to Brentwood & Warley in 1889.

By the 1870s, the goods yard which was located on the country side of the line south of the station contained a number of loops and sidings. As well as serving a goods shed, spurs served a local gas works and Robsons Maltings. By the 1890s, a coal siding operated by East Anglian coal merchant Thomas Moy was in operation.

The engine shed was rebuilt in 1893.

=== London & North Eastern Railway (1923–1947) ===
After the grouping of 1923, operation of the station passed to the London and North Eastern Railway (LNER). The LNER doubled the number of tracks passing through to four from 1934. Two new platforms were opened on the south side of the station, with a new booking office.

The bell tower was demolished during the 1920s.

Plans to electrify the line through Brentwood to Shenfield were announced during the 1930s, but put on hold after World War II broke out. The station was bombed and the new booking office was damaged.

World War II saw an increase of engines allocated to Brentwood engine shed, possibly resited away from the larger and more obvious target at Stratford.

=== British Railways (1948–1996) ===
After nationalisation on 1 January 1948, Brentwood became part of the Eastern Region of British Railways.

The engine shed was closed in 1949, although the goods yard had a small petrol shunter that was maintained locally, which was withdrawn in September 1956.

The electric service to Shenfield was inaugurated on 26 September 1949, but services were run to steam timings with a number of steam trains still operating. The full electric service commenced officially on 7 November 1949 (although a full dummy run had taken place the previous day).

In 1969, the station's name reverted to Brentwood.

=== Privatisation era (1996–present) ===
The station is sited at the bottom of a bank which ascends to the east towards Shenfield, which presented a significant climb to down-steam trains. Until 2001, embankment ladders were present to allow workmen to access the tracks but these were replaced with a walkway along the tracks.

In 2010, National Express East Anglia, then the train operating company for the line, commenced an improvement programme at the station, including the expansion of the entrance and ticket hall, refurbishment of waiting rooms and provision for the installation of customer lifts to the platforms.

In May 2015, the Shenfield stopping service was taken over by TfL Rail and became part of the Elizabeth line subsequently in May 2022.

=== Accidents and incidents ===
- On 19 September 1850, nine workmen were killed when they were struck by a train near Brentwood station in dense fog. The ECR was criticised by the coroner's jury for not adequately protecting the men.
- On 20 November 1902, approximately 80 passengers were injured on an Ipswich-Liverpool Street service that had stopped at Brentwood & Warley station when it was rear-ended by a train that was not in service. A Board of Trade report stated that the empty train's speed "was not more than four or five miles an hour" at the time of the collision as it had only just pulled out of a siding to enter service from Brentwood.
- On 8 July 1926, 12 people were injured when a passenger and mail train from Liverpool Street was approaching Brentwood & Warley and collided head-on with a train pilot engine. At the moment of impact, the speed of the passenger train had been about 10 mph, whilst the light engine was almost or completely stationary. The primary causes of the accident were recorded as driver and shunter errors, as well as excessive speed.
- On 10 February 1941, seven people were killed and 19 seriously injured in a collision on the track between Harold Wood and Brentwood & Warley. An express train travelling from Liverpool Street to Norwich Thorpe came to a stand on the main line, unable to ascend the bank due to a shortage of steam. About eight minutes later, it was run into from the rear by a Southend Victoria-bound stopping service, which had passed a signal at danger. The speed of the Southend train was reported to have been around 30 mph, resulting in a violent collision. The driver of the Southend train was fully fit, highly experienced, and should have noticed both the red signal and the stopped train ahead. He "fully admitted his responsibility for the collision" and according to a Ministry of War Transport investigation: "Such a grave lapse on the part of an experienced main line driver is difficult to explain."

== Services ==
All services at Brentwood are operated by the Elizabeth line using Class 345 electric multiple units. The typical off-peak service in trains per hour is:

- 8 tph to London Paddington; of which, 2 continue to Heathrow Terminal 5
- 8 tph to Shenfield.

On Sundays, the service is reduced to 4 tph in each direction between Shenfield and London Paddington, with 2 tph continuing to run to and from Heathrow Terminal 5.

Preceding station	Elizabeth line	Following station
Harold Wood towards Heathrow Terminal 5	Elizabeth line	Shenfield Terminus
