= Chappelow =

Chappelow is a surname. Notable people with the surname include:

- Allan Chappelow (1919–2006), British writer and photographer
- Archibald Cecil Chappelow (1886–1976), British fine arts expert
- Eric Chappelow (1890–1957), British poet and a World War I conscientious objector
- Grace Chappelow (1884–1971), British suffragette
- Leonard Chappelow (1683–1768), British clergyman and orientalist
