= Garden of Eden =

Biblical garden of God

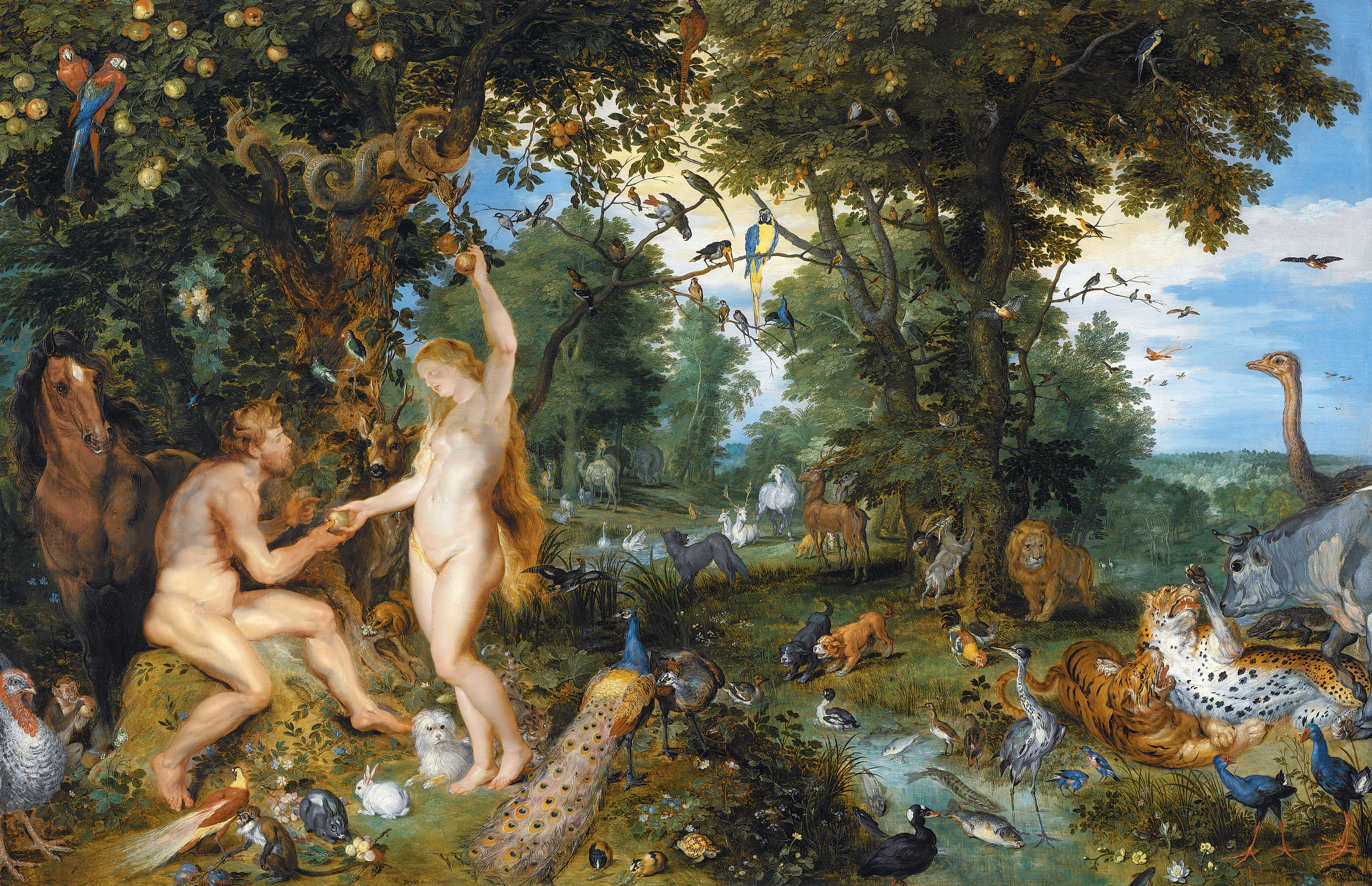
The Garden of Eden with the Fall of Man by Jan Brueghel the Elder and Pieter Paul Rubens, c. 1615, depicting both domestic and exotic wild animals such as tigers, parrots, and ostriches co-existing in the garden

The Garden of Eden (/ˈiːdən/ EE-dən; Biblical Hebrew: גַּן־עֵדֶן, romanized: gan-ʿĒḏen; Greek: Εδέμ; Latin: Paradisus), also called Garden of God (גַּן־יְהֹוָה, gan-YHWH and גַן־אֱלֹהִים, gan-Elohim) or the (Terrestrial) Paradise, is the biblical paradise described in Genesis 2–3 and Ezekiel 28 and 31.

The location of Eden is described in the Book of Genesis as the source of four tributaries. Various suggestions have been made for its location: at the head of the Persian Gulf, in southern Mesopotamia where the Tigris and Euphrates rivers run into the sea; and in Armenia. Others theorize that Eden was the entire Fertile Crescent or a region of substantial size in Mesopotamia, where its native inhabitants still exist in cities such as Telassar.

Like the Genesis flood narrative, the Genesis creation narrative, and the account of the Tower of Babel, the story of Eden echoes the Mesopotamian myth of a king, as a primordial man, who is placed in a divine garden to guard the tree of life. Scholars note that the Eden narrative shows parallels with aspects of Solomon's Temple and Jerusalem, attesting to its nature as a sacred place. Mentions of Eden are also made in the Bible elsewhere in Genesis 13:10, in Isaiah 51:3, Ezekiel 36:35, and Joel 2:3; Zechariah 14 and Ezekiel 47 use paradisical imagery without naming Eden.

The name derives from the Akkadian edinnu, from a Sumerian word edin meaning 'plain' or 'steppe', closely related to an Aramaic root word meaning 'fruitful, well-watered'. Another interpretation associates the name with a Hebrew word for 'pleasure'; thus the Vulgate reads paradisum voluptatis in Genesis 2:8, and the Douay–Rheims Bible, following, has the wording "And the Lord God had planted a paradise of pleasure".

== Biblical narratives ==
=== Genesis ===
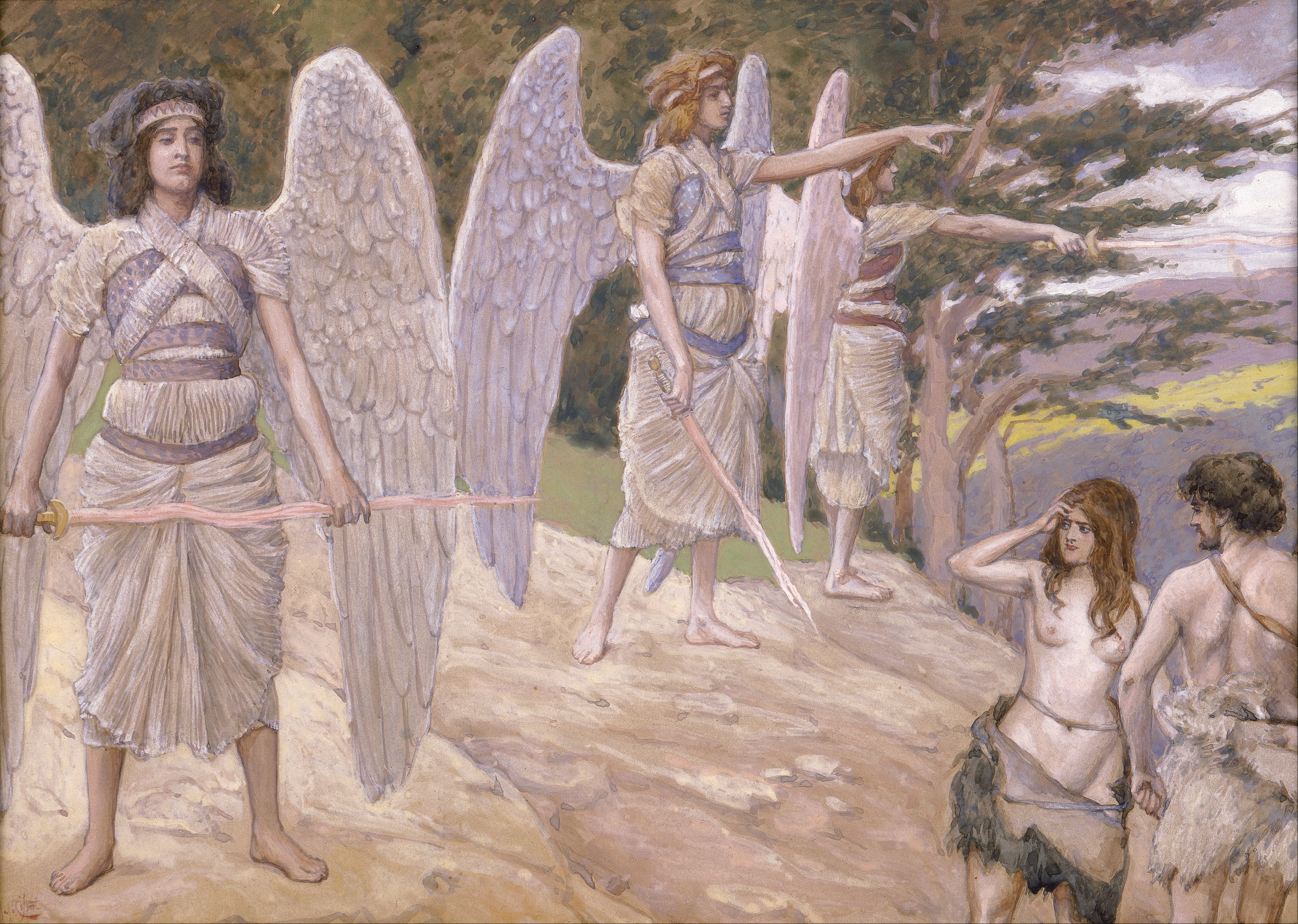
Expulsion from Paradise, painting by James Tissot, c. 1896–1902

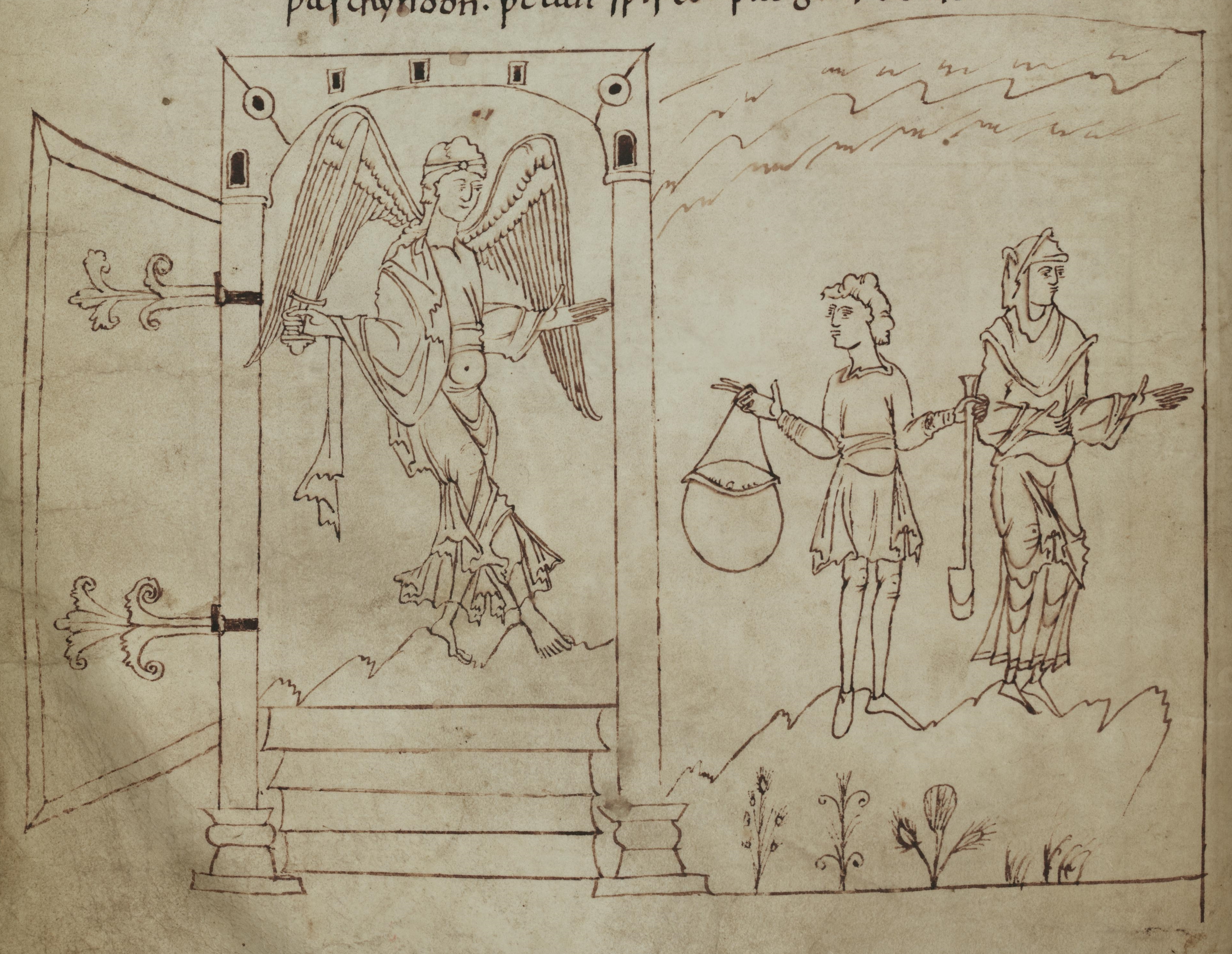
The Expulsion illustrated in the English Junius manuscript, c. 1000 CE

The second part of the Genesis creation narrative, Genesis 2:4–3:24, (Note: Many English translations divide Genesis 2:4 into two parts, verse 4a completing the account of creation contained in Genesis 1, and verse 4b introducing a new narrative or a second account of creation. See for example Genesis 2:4 in the Revised Standard Version. Alternatively the English Standard Version incorporates the whole verse in its opening words of the second account of the creation.) opens with Yahweh-Elohim (translated here "the LORD God") (Note: See Names of God in Judaism) creating the first man (Adam), whom he placed in a garden that he planted "eastward in Eden":

And out of the ground made the Lord God to grow every tree that is pleasant to the sight, and good for food; the tree of life also in the midst of the garden, and the tree of knowledge of good and evil.

— Genesis 2:9,

The man was free to eat from any tree in the garden except the tree of the knowledge of good and evil, which was taboo. Last of all, God made a woman (Eve) from a rib of the man to be a companion for the man. In Genesis 3, the man and the woman were seduced by the serpent into eating the forbidden fruit, and they were expelled from the garden to prevent them from also eating of the tree of life, and thus living forever. Cherubim, and a flaming sword which turned every way, were put in place at the east of the garden, "to guard the way of [or to] the tree of life".

Genesis 2:10–14 lists four rivers in association with the garden of Eden: Pishon, Gihon, Tigris (Hiddekel in Hebrew), and the Euphrates (Perath in Hebrew). It also refers to the land of Cush—translated/interpreted as Ethiopia, but thought by some to equate to Cossaea, a Greek name for the land of the Kassites. These lands lie north of Elam, immediately to the east of ancient Babylon, which, unlike Ethiopia, does lie within the region being described. In Antiquities of the Jews, the first-century Jewish historian Josephus identifies the Pishon as what "the Greeks called Ganges" and the Geon (Gehon) as the Nile.

=== Ezekiel ===
In Ezekiel 28:12–19, the prophet Ezekiel the "son of man" sets down God's word against the king of Tyre: the king was the "seal of perfection", adorned with precious stones from the day of his creation, placed by God in the garden of Eden on the holy mountain as a guardian cherub. However, the king sinned through wickedness and violence, and so he was driven out of the garden and thrown to the earth, where now he is consumed by God's fire: "All those who knew you in the nations are appalled at you, you have come to a horrible end and will be no more." (Ezekiel 28:19).

== Proposed locations ==
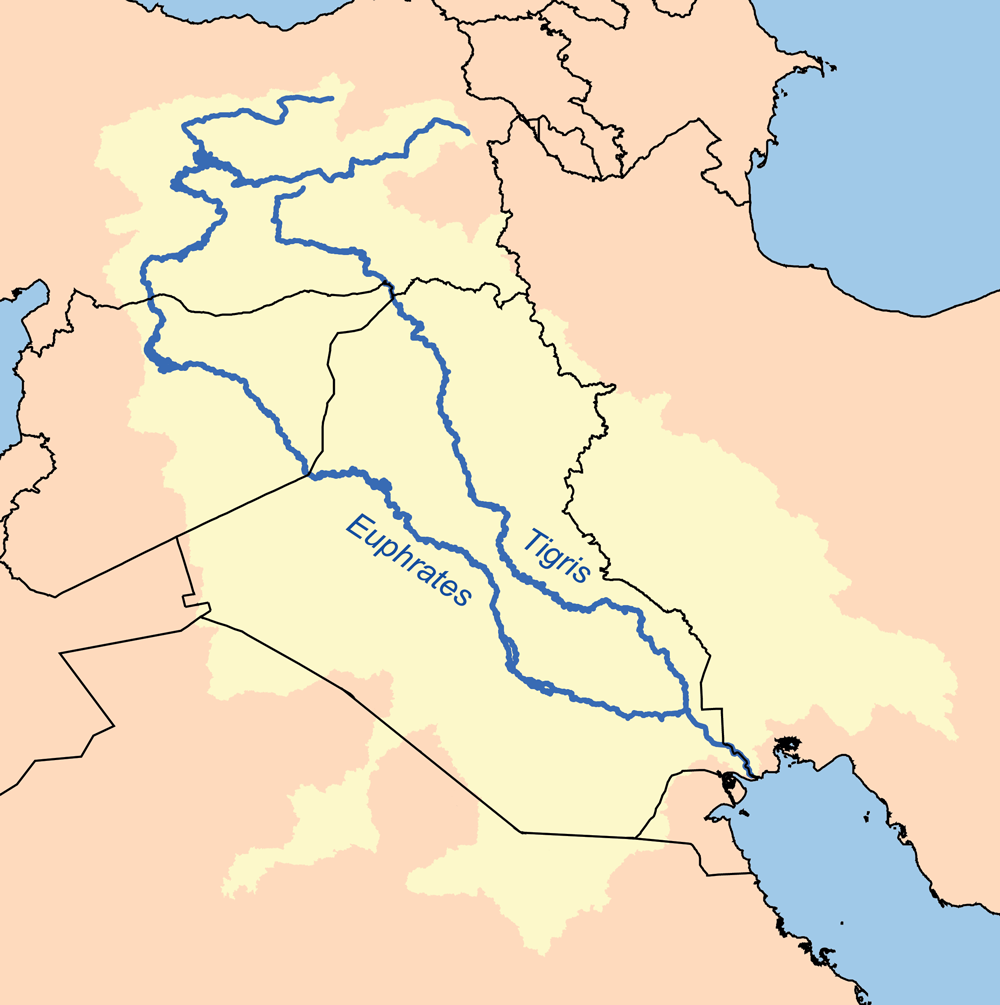
The Tigris and Euphrates rivers

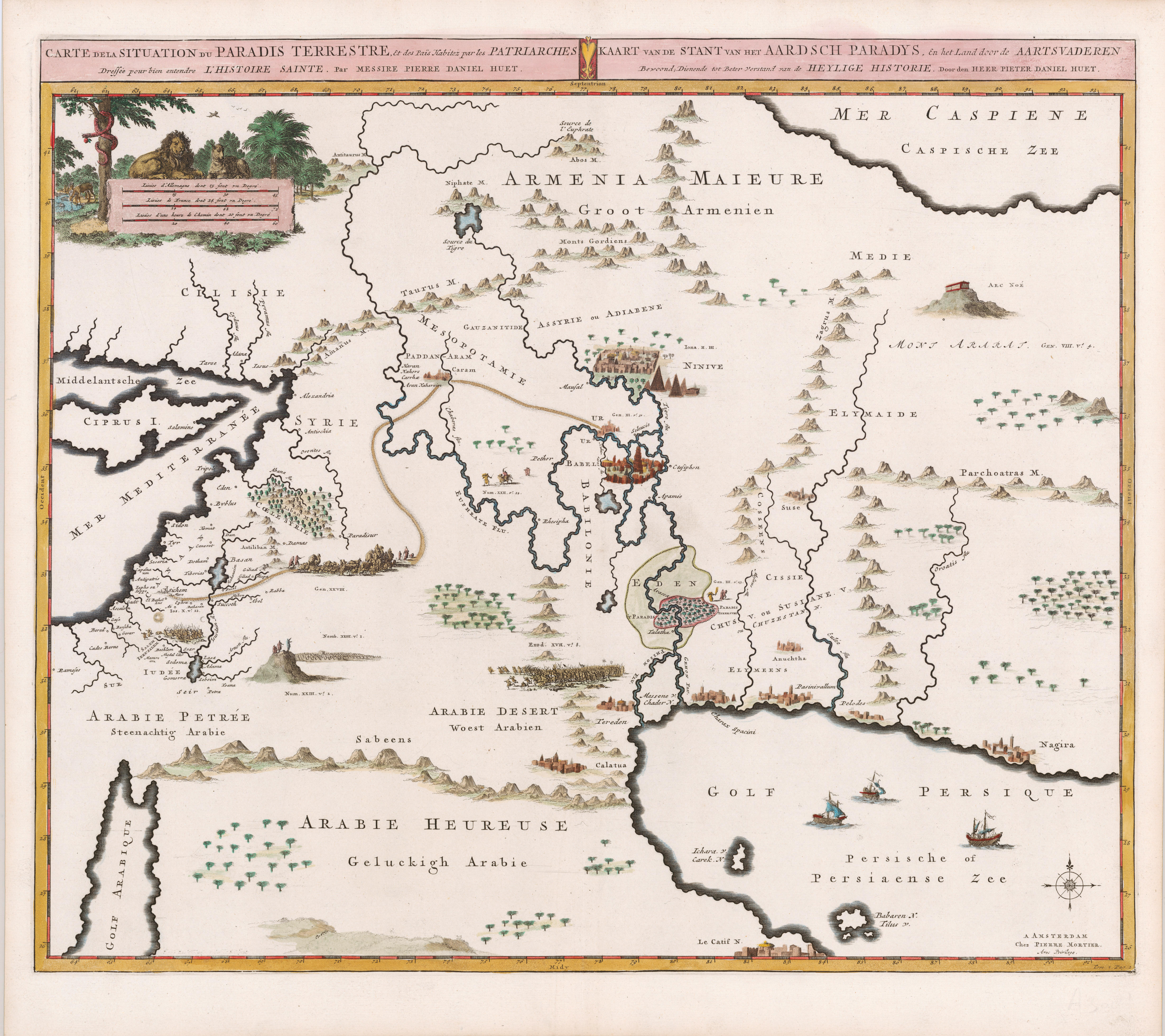
A map by Pierre Mortier captioned Map of the location of the terrestrial paradise, and of the country inhabited by the patriarchs, laid out for the good understanding of sacred history, by Pierre Daniel Huet (1700)

The location of Eden is described in Genesis 2:10–14:

And a river went out of Eden to water the garden; and from thence it was parted, and became four heads. The name of the first is Pishon; that is it which compasseth the whole land of Havilah, where there is gold; and the gold of that land is good; there is bdellium and the onyx stone. And the name of the second river is Gihon; the same is it that compasseth the whole land of Cush. And the name of the third river is Tigris; that is it which goeth toward the east of Asshur. And the fourth river is the Euphrates.

Suggestions for the location of Eden include the head of the Persian Gulf, as argued by Juris Zarins, in southern Mesopotamia where the Tigris and Euphrates rivers run into the sea; and in the Armenian Highlands or Armenian National Plateau. British archaeologist David Rohl locates it in Iran, and in the vicinity of Tabriz, but this suggestion has not been adopted by mainstream academia.

Others theorize that Eden was merely a region of "considerable size" in Mesopotamia, where its native inhabitants still exist in cities such as Telassar, based on verses such as Isaiah 37:12, or that it encompassed the entire Fertile Crescent.

According to Terje Stordalen, the Book of Ezekiel places Eden in Lebanon. "[I]t appears that the Lebanon is an alternative placement in Phoenician myth (as in Ez 28,13, III.48) of the Garden of Eden", and there are connections between paradise, the Garden of Eden and the forests of Lebanon (possibly used symbolically) within prophetic writings. Edward Lipinski and Peter Kyle McCarter have suggested that the garden of the gods, the oldest Sumerian analog of the Garden of Eden, relates to a mountain sanctuary in the Lebanon and Anti-Lebanon ranges.

Some religious groups have believed the location of the garden to be local to them, outside of the Middle East. Some early leaders of Mormonism held that it was located in Jackson County, Missouri. The 20th-century Panacea Society believed it was located at the site of their home town of Bedford, England, while preacher Elvy E. Callaway believed it was on the Apalachicola River in Florida, near the town of Bristol. Some suggested that the location is in Jerusalem.

On his third voyage to the Americas in 1498, Christopher Columbus thought he may have reached the Earthly Paradise upon first seeing the South American mainland.

Following its acceptance of Christianity in 1491, leaders of the Kingdom of Kongo came to believe that the Terrestrial Paradise, and thus the Garden of Eden was in Central Africa. Following logic of medieval European maps, Portuguese cartographers claimed that both the Congo River and the Zambezi flowed out from the Paradise, and Kongolese intellectuals, perhaps students in Lisbon, accepted that its location in maps drawn in Mediterranean Europe showed Kongo's eastern border of the Paradise.

The idea was fully accepted, as Italian missionary Giovanni Antonio Cavazzi, reported in 1687 that the Kongolese "constantly assert that in the creation of the Universe, God assigned to the angels and his other ministerial confidants the task of putting the rest of the earth in order, reserving for himself alone, according to his sublime idea and his genius, the forming of the countries of Ethiopia, and especially the kingdoms of Congo. All the rest were extracted from nothing in the dark night of shapeless Chaos, and only this one part, with singular privilege received its most perfect form in the serenely bright light of a beautiful afternoon."

In his book The Creation, the Garden of Eden and the Origin of the Chinese, Tse Tsan-tai argued that the Garden of Eden was located in modern-day Xinjiang.

== Blissful garden concept ==
Scholars have identified and proposed connections to similar concepts from ancient religions and mythologies, and have studied the post-scriptural evolution of the concept in religion and arts.

=== Sumeria and ancient Greece; Renaissance ===
A number of parallel concepts to the biblical Garden of Eden exist in various other religions and mythologies. Dilmun in the Sumerian story of Enki and Ninhursag is a paradisaical abode of the immortals, where sickness and death were unknown. The garden of the Hesperides in Greek mythology was also somewhat similar to the Jewish concept of the Garden of Eden, and by the 16th century a larger intellectual association was made in the Cranach painting.

Henrik Pfeiffer believed that in Genesis 2, the tree in the middle of the garden was a form of the concept of a universal world tree, and the serpent's inclusion could be traced to a Sumerian tradition of the Inanna and the Huluppu Tree. Tablet XI in the Epic of Gilgamesh has also been compared; where the gods take Utnapishtim and settle him at the mouths of the two great rivers Tigris and Euphrates, with Yahweh settling a man in the garden located near the same area.

=== Canaanite origin theory ===
By studying late-13th-century BCE clay tablets from Ugarit, Hebrew Bible scholars M.J.A. Korpel and J.C. de Moor reconstructed close Canaanite parallels, which they posit as being the origin of the biblical creation myth from the first chapters of Genesis including the Garden of Eden and Adam narrative. Their reconstructed texts talk about the creator deity El, who lived in a vineyard or garden together with his wife Asherah on Mount Ararat.

Another god, Horon, tries to depose El and when thrown down from the mountain, he transforms the Tree of Life from the garden into a Tree of Death. Horon also spreads around a poisonous fog, Adam is sent from the mountain to restore life on earth, Horon takes the shape of a large serpent and bites him, which leads to Adam and his wife losing their immortality. However, John Day argues that these stories are not explicitly attested in the Ugaritic texts but are reconstructed on the basis of speculative and dubious suppositions.

In the original fragmented text, the "tree of death" grows near the Tigris River and is used by Horanu to cure a snakebite and restore El's Garden. It may have functioned similarly to the tree of life, but it was not a final solution and would not grant immortality.

=== Evolution of Old Iranian "paradise" concept ===
The word "paradise" entered English from the French paradis, inherited from the Latin paradisus, paradisum, from the Greek parádeisos (παράδεισος). The Greek was derived from an Old Iranian form, ultimately from Proto-Iranian *paridayjah, which also derived Old Persian 𐎱𐎼𐎭𐎹𐎭𐎠𐎶 (p-r-d-y-d-a-m, /paradayadām/, and Avestan 𐬞𐬀𐬌𐬭𐬌⸱𐬛𐬀𐬉𐬰𐬀, pairi.daēza. The literal meaning of this word is 'walled enclosure', from *pari- 'around' (cognate with the Greek περί and the English peri-, of identical meaning), and *dáyjah, "to make, form (a wall), build" (cognate with the Greek τοῖχος, 'wall'). The word's etymology is ultimately derived from the Proto-Indo-European root *per- 'around', and the word *dʰóyǵʰos, 'something that is formed'.

By the 6th/5th century BCE, the Old Iranian word had entered the Akkadian language as pardesu, 'domain'. It subsequently came to indicate the expansive walled gardens of the First Persian Empire, and was later borrowed into a number of languages: into Greek as παράδεισος (parádeisos), 'park for animals', cf. Anabasis, the most famous work of Xenophon; into Aramaic as pardaysa, 'royal park'; and into Hebrew (see below).

The idea of a walled enclosure was not preserved in most Iranian usage, and generally came to refer to a plantation or other cultivated area, not necessarily walled. For example, the Old Iranian word survives as pardis in New Persian, as well as its derivative pālīz (or jālīz), which denotes a vegetable patch.

==== Hebrew Bible and Jewish literature ====
The word entered the Hebrew language with the meaning of pardes (פַּרְדֵּס), 'orchard', appearing thrice in the Tanakh: in the Song of Solomon (4:13), Ecclesiastes (2:5), and Nehemiah (2:8).

The word pardes occurs three times in the Hebrew Bible, but always in contexts other than a connection with Eden: in the Song of Solomon 4:13: "Thy plants are an orchard (pardes) of pomegranates, with pleasant fruits; camphire, with spikenard"; Ecclesiastes 2:5: "I made me gardens and orchards (pardes), and I planted trees in them of all kind of fruits"; and in Nehemiah 2:8: "And a letter unto Asaph the keeper of the king's orchard (pardes), that he may give me timber to make beams for the gates of the palace which appertained to the house, and for the wall of the city".

In these examples, pardes clearly means 'orchard' or 'park', but in the Jewish apocalyptic literature and in the Talmud paradise gains its associations with the Garden of Eden and its heavenly prototype, a meaning also present in the New Testament.

Italian historian Mario Liverani argues that the Garden of Eden was modeled on Persian royal gardens, while John Day argues that linguistic and other evidence indicates that the yahwistic Eden story was composed before the Persian period. US archaeologist Lawrence Stager posits that the biblical Eden narrative drew from aspects of Solomon's palace and temple compound and Jerusalem.

==== Septuagint and New Testament ====
In the Septuagint (3rd–1st centuries BCE), the Greek παράδεισος (parádeisos) was used to translate both the Hebrew פרדס (pardes) and גן (gan), meaning 'garden' (e.g. Genesis 2:8, Ezekiel 28:13): it is from this usage that the use of paradise to refer to the Garden of Eden derives.

In the New Testament paradise becomes the realm of the blessed (as opposed to the realm of the cursed) among those who have already died, with literary Hellenistic influences.

==== Quran ====
The same usage as in the Septuagint also appears in Arabic and in the Quran as firdaws فردوس.

== Other views ==
=== Jewish eschatology ===
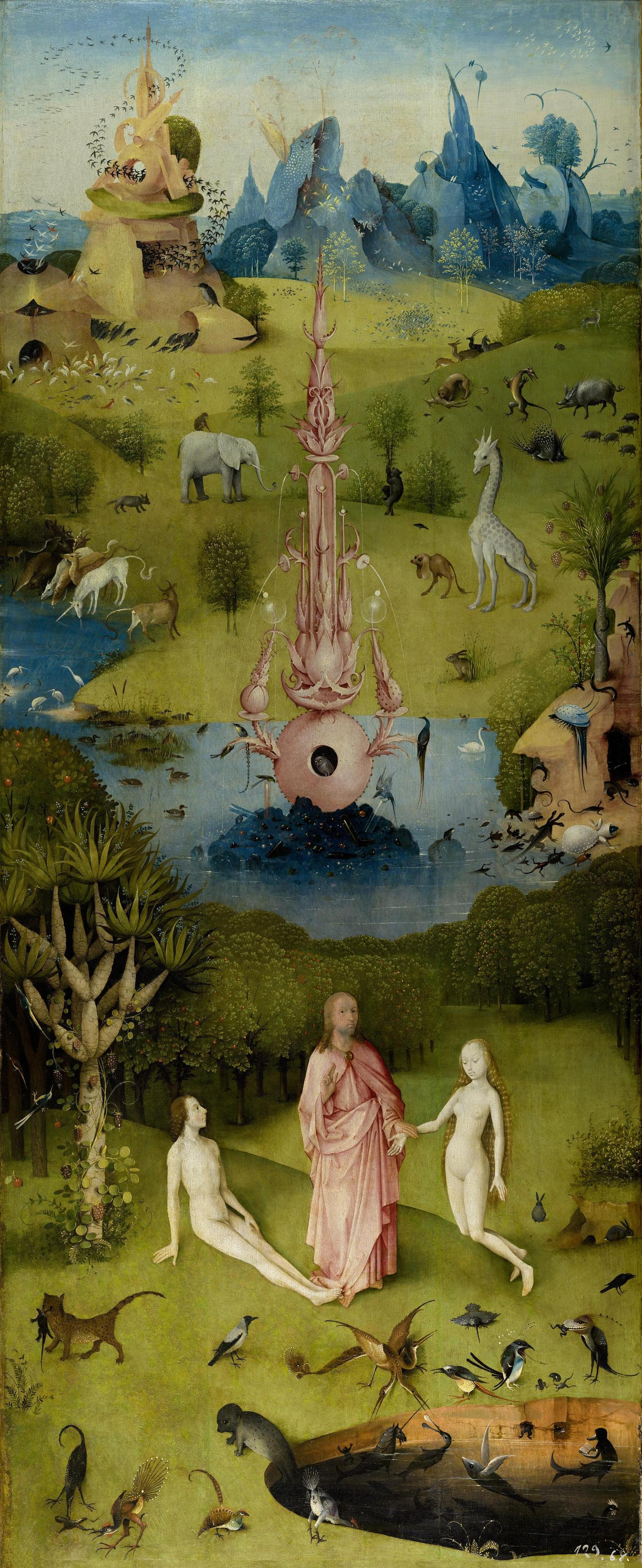
The Garden of Eden in the left panel of Bosch's The Garden of Earthly Delights

In the Talmud and the Jewish Kabbalah, the scholars agree that there are two types of spiritual places called "Garden in Eden". The first is rather terrestrial, of abundant fertility and luxuriant vegetation, known as the "lower Gan Eden" (gan meaning garden). The second is envisioned as being celestial, the habitation of righteous, Jewish and non-Jewish, immortal souls, known as the "higher Gan Eden". The rabbis differentiate between Gan and Eden. Adam is said to have dwelt only in the Gan, whereas Eden is said never to be witnessed by any mortal eye.

According to Jewish eschatology, the higher Gan Eden is called the "Garden of Righteousness". It has been created since the beginning of the world, and will appear gloriously at the end of time. The righteous dwelling there will enjoy the sight of the heavenly chayot carrying the throne of God. Each of the righteous will walk with God, who will lead them in a dance. Its Jewish and non-Jewish inhabitants are "clothed with garments of light and eternal life, and eat of the tree of life" (Enoch 58,3) near to God and his anointed ones. This Jewish rabbinical concept of a higher Gan Eden is opposed by the Hebrew terms gehinnom and sheol, figurative names for the place of spiritual purification for the wicked dead in Judaism, a place envisioned as being at the greatest possible distance from heaven.

Some modern Orthodox Jews believe that history will complete itself and the ultimate destination will be when all mankind returns to the Garden of Eden.

==== Legends of the Jews ====
In the 1909 book Legends of the Jews, Louis Ginzberg compiled Jewish legends found in rabbinic literature. Among the legends are ones about the two Gardens of Eden. Beyond Paradise is the higher Gan Eden, where God is enthroned and explains the Torah to its inhabitants. The higher Gan Eden contains three hundred and ten worlds and is divided into seven compartments. The compartments are not described, though it is implied that each compartment is greater than the previous one and is joined based on one's merit.

The first compartment is for Jewish martyrs, the second for those who drowned, the third for "Rabbi Johanan ben Zakkai and his disciples," the fourth for those whom the cloud of glory carried off, the fifth for penitents, the sixth for youths who have never sinned; and the seventh for the poor who lived decently and studied the Torah.

In chapter two, Legends of the Jews gives a brief description of the lower Gan Eden. The tree of knowledge is a hedge around the tree of life, which is so vast that "it would take a man five hundred years to traverse a distance equal to the diameter of the trunk". From beneath the trees flow all the world's waters in the form of four rivers: Tigris, Nile, Euphrates, and Ganges. After the fall of man, the world was no longer irrigated by this water.

While in the garden, Adam and Eve were served meat dishes by angels and the animals of the world understood human language, respected mankind as God's image, and feared Adam and Eve. When one dies, one's soul must pass through the lower Gan Eden in order to reach the higher Gan Eden. The way to the garden is the Cave of Machpelah that Adam guards. The cave leads to the gate of the garden, guarded by a cherub with a flaming sword. If a soul is unworthy of entering, the sword annihilates it. Within the garden is a pillar of fire and smoke that extends to the higher Gan Eden, which the soul must climb in order to reach the higher Gan Eden.

=== Christian views ===
==== Atemporal fall view ====
For some Christians, especially in the Eastern Orthodox tradition, Eden is considered a reality outside of empirical history that affects the entire history of the universe as seen in the idea of an atemporal fall which separates humanity's current reduced form of time from the divine life enjoyed in Eden. This idea of an atemporal separation from Eden has been most recently defended by theologians David Bentley Hart, John Behr, and Sergei Bulgakov as well as having roots in the writings of several early church fathers, especially Origen and Maximus the Confessor.

=== Islamic view ===
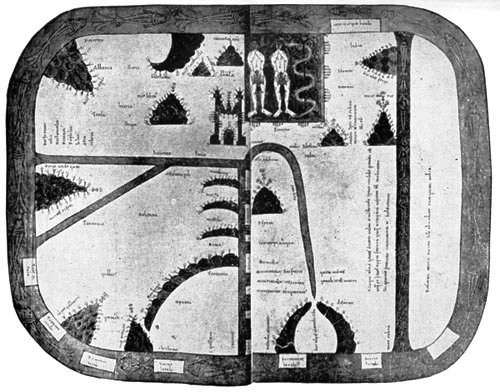
A Mozarabic world map from 1109, with Eden in the East (at top)

The term جنات عدن jannāt ʿadn ("Gardens of Eden" or "Gardens of Perpetual Residence") is used in the Quran for the destination of the righteous. There are several mentions of "the Garden" in the Quran. The Garden of Eden, without the word ʿadn, is commonly the fourth layer of the Islamic heaven and not necessarily thought as the dwelling place of Adam.

The Quran refers frequently over various Surah about the first abode of Adam and his spouse (told to be Hawwa or Eve, her name is never given in the Quran), including surah Sad, which features 18 verses on the subject (38:71–88), surah al-Baqara, surah al-A'raf, and surah al-Hijr although sometimes without mentioning the location. The narrative mainly surrounds the resulting expulsion of Adam and his spouse after they were tempted by Iblis (Satan).

Despite the biblical account, the Quran mentions only one tree in Eden, the tree of immortality, from which God specifically forbade Adam and his spouse. Some exegesis added an account, about Satan, disguised as a serpent to enter the Garden, repeatedly told Adam to eat from the tree, and eventually both Adam and his spouse did so, resulting in disobeying God. These stories are also featured in the hadith collections, including al-Tabari.

Quranic scripture of story

Quranic verses Q. 2:35–38, are believed to tell the story of Adam disobeying God's command and eating the Forbidden Fruit, and of God ordered him out of the Garden. One translation (the Clear Quran) that indicates that the Garden of Eden was in Heaven goes:

- We cautioned, "O Adam! Live with your wife in Paradise (lit. "the Garden") and eat as freely as you please, but do not approach this tree, or else you will be wrongdoers." (2:35)
- But Satan deceived them—leading to their fall from the [blissful] state they were in,1 and We said, "Descend from the heavens [to the earth] as enemies to each other.2 You will find in the earth a residence and provision for your appointed stay." (2:36)
- Then Adam was inspired with words ˹of prayer˺ by his Lord, so He accepted his repentance. Surely He is the Accepter of Repentance, Most Merciful. (2:37)
- We said, "Descend all of you! Then when guidance comes to you from Me, whoever follows it, there will be no fear for them, nor will they grieve. (2:38)

Location

Quranic verses describe Adam was being expelled from al-Jannah, "the garden", which is the commonly used word for paradise in Islam. However, according to Ibn Kathir (d. 1372) and Ar-Razi (d. 1209), (exegetes of the Quran), four interpretations of the location of the garden prevailed among early Muslims:

- that the garden was Paradise itself,
- that it was a separate garden created especially for Adam and his spouse,
- that it was located on Earth,
- that it was best for the Muslims not to be concerned with the location of the garden.

According to T. O. Shanavas however, contextual analysis of Quranic verses suggests the Garden of Eden could not have been in Paradise and must have been on earth. (For example, a sahih hadith reports Muhammad said: "Allah says: I have prepared for my righteous servants that which has neither been seen by eyes, nor heard by ears, nor ever conceived by any man." i.e. no man has ever seen Paradise. Since Adam was a man, he could not have seen paradise, therefore he could not have lived there.)

Doctrine of "The Fall of Man"

Islamic exegesis does not regard Adam and his spouse's expulsion from paradise as punishment for disobedience or a result from abused free will on their part. Instead, ibn Qayyim al-Jawziyya (1292–1350) writes, God's wisdom (ḥikma) destined humanity to leave the garden and settle on earth. This is because God wants to unfold the full range of his attributes. If humans were not to live on earth, God could not express his love, forgiveness, and power to his creation. If humans were not to experience suffering, they could neither long for paradise nor appreciate its delights.

Khwaja Abdullah Ansari (1006–1088) describes Adam and his spouse's expulsion as ultimately caused by God. Nonetheless, despite the paradoxical notion that man has no choice but to comply to God's will, this does not mean that humans should not blame themselves for their "sin" of complying. This is exemplified by Adam and his spouse in the Quran (Q. 7:23 "Our Lord! We have wronged ourselves. If You do not forgive us and have mercy on us, we will certainly be losers"), in contrast to Iblis (Satan) who blames God for leading him astray (Q. 15:37).

=== Latter Day Saints ===
Followers of the Latter Day Saint movement believe that after Adam and Eve were expelled from the Garden of Eden, they resided in a place known as Adam-ondi-Ahman, located in present-day Daviess County, Missouri. It is recorded in the Doctrine and Covenants that Adam blessed his posterity there and that he will return to that place at the time of the final judgment in fulfillment of a prophecy set forth in the Bible.

Numerous early church leaders, including Brigham Young, Heber C. Kimball, and George Q. Cannon, taught that the Garden of Eden itself was located in nearby Jackson County, but there are no surviving first-hand accounts of that doctrine being taught by Joseph Smith himself. Latter Day Saint doctrine is unclear as to the exact location of the Garden of Eden, but tradition among adherents places it somewhere in the vicinity of Adam-ondi-Ahman, or in Jackson County.

=== Gnosticism ===
The 2nd-century Gnostic teacher Justin held that there were three original divinities, a transcendental being called the Good, an intermediate male figure known as Elohim and Eden who is an Earth-mother. The world is created from the love of Elohim and Eden, but evil later is brought into the universe when Elohim learns of the existence of the Good above him and ascends trying to reach it.

== Art and literature ==
=== Art ===
One of oldest depictions of Garden of Eden is made in Byzantine style in Ravenna, while the city was still under Byzantine control. A preserved blue mosaic is part of the mausoleum of Galla Placidia. Circular motifs represent flowers of the garden of Eden. The Garden of Eden motifs most frequently portrayed in illuminated manuscripts and paintings are the "Sleep of Adam" ("Creation of Eve"), the "Temptation of Eve" by the Serpent, the "Fall of Man" where Adam takes the fruit, and the "Expulsion". The idyll of "Naming Day in Eden" was less often depicted. Michelangelo depicted a scene at the Garden of Eden on the Sistine Chapel ceiling.

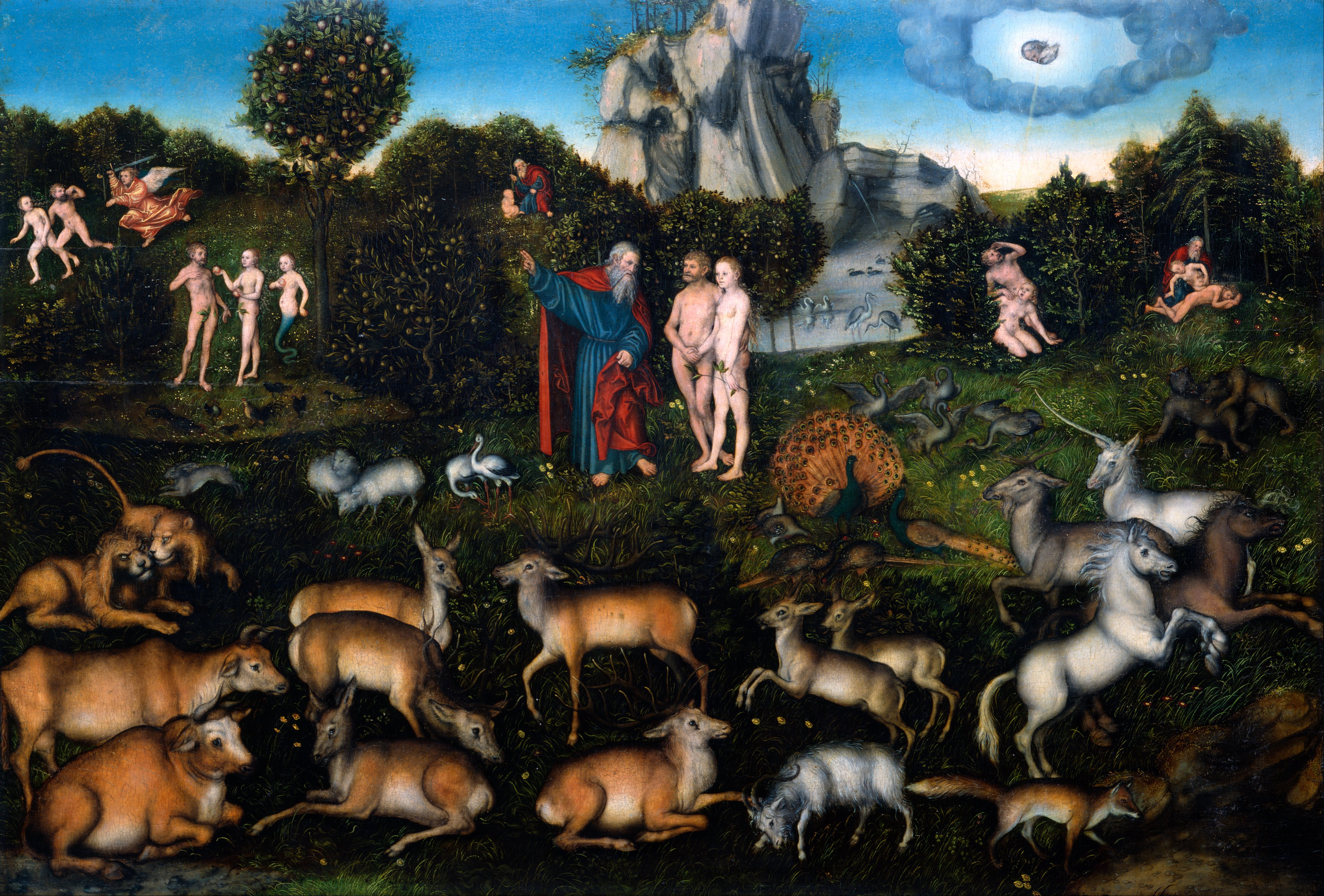
The Garden of Eden by Lucas Cranach der Ältere, a 16th-century German depiction of Eden

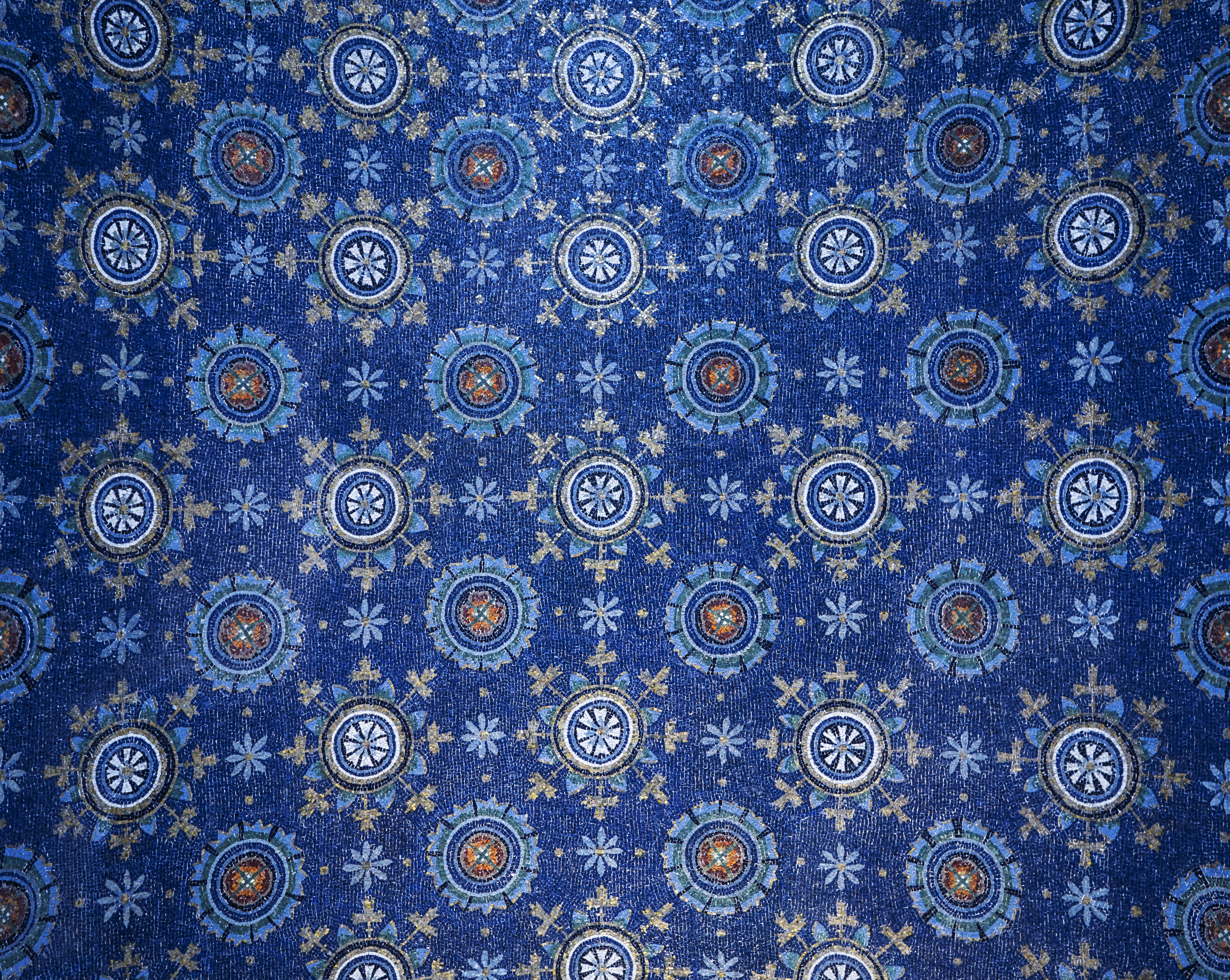
Fifth-century "Garden of Eden" mosaic in mausoleum of Galla Placidia in Ravenna, Italy. UNESCO World Heritage Site.

The Garden of Eden by Thomas Cole (1828)

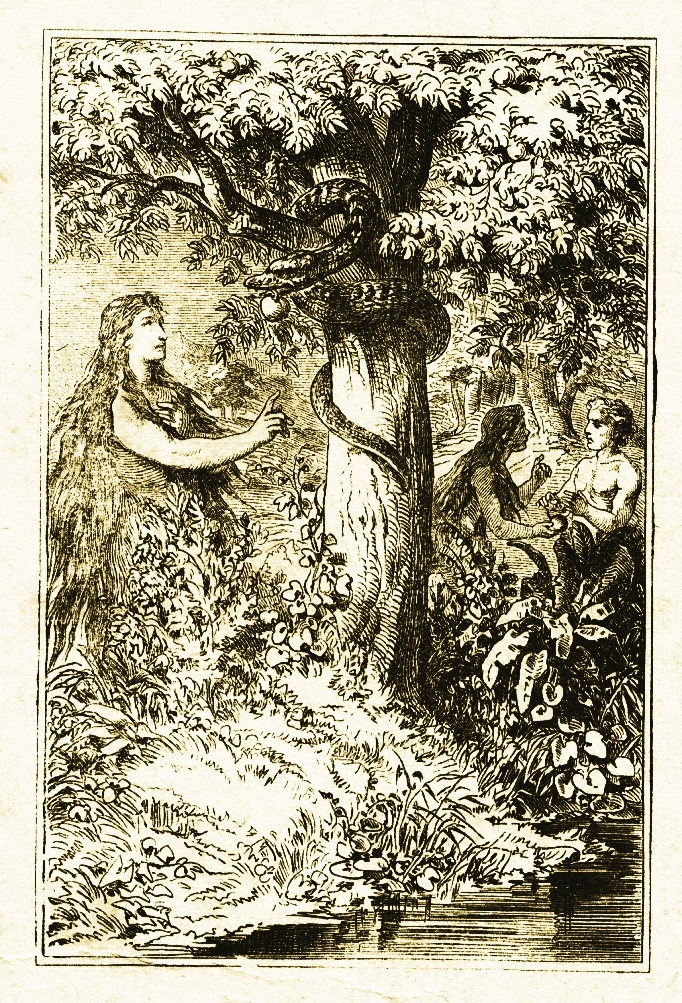
After wandering through the Garden of Eden, Eve takes the forbidden fruit while Lilith speaks to Adam (by Carl Poellath, c. 1886)

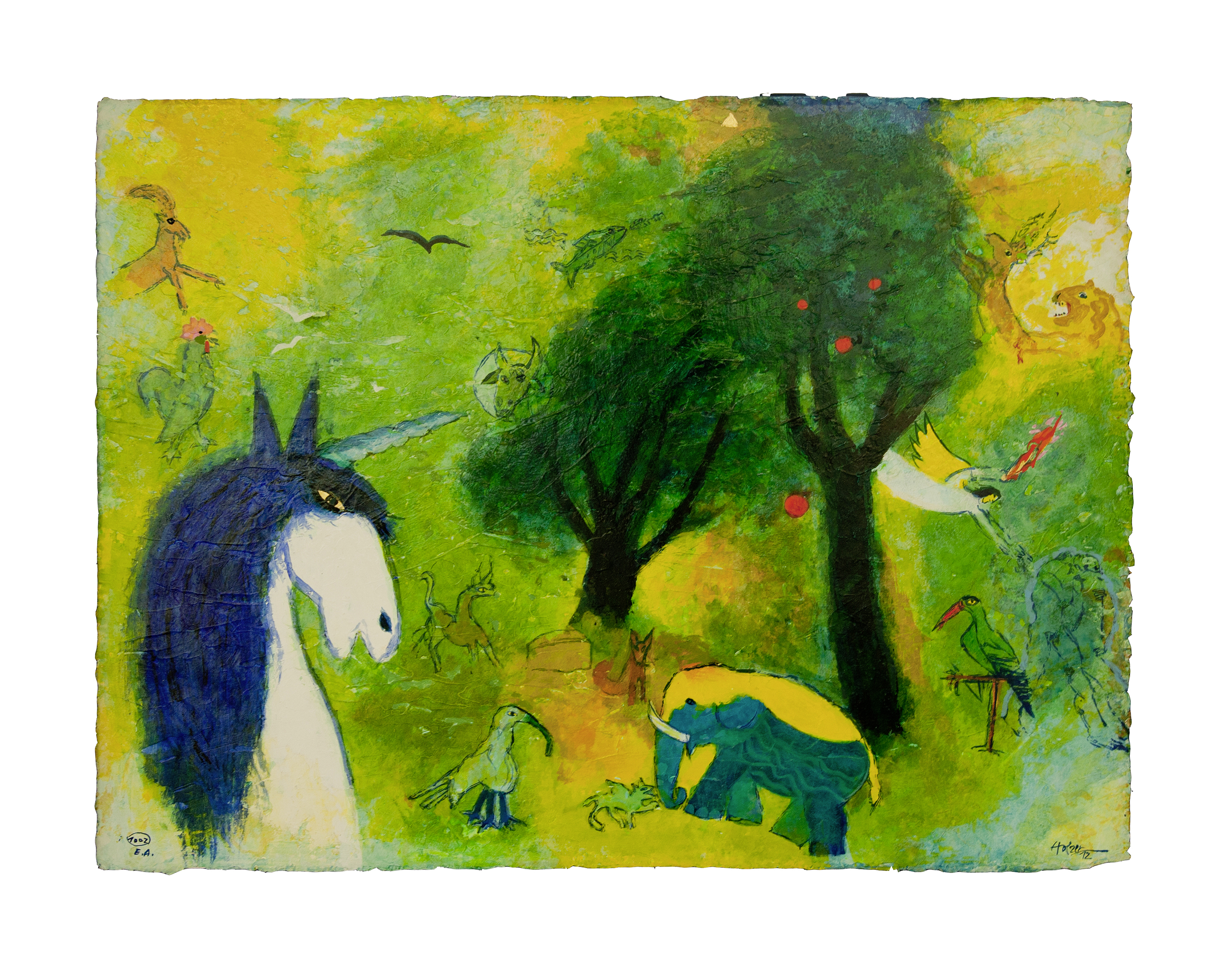
The Garden of Eden by Adi Holzer (2012)

=== Literature ===
For many medieval writers, the image of the Garden of Eden also creates a location for human love and sexuality, often associated with the classic and medieval trope of the locus amoenus.

In the Divine Comedy, Dante Alighieri places the Garden at the top of Mt. Purgatory. Dante, the pilgrim, emerges into the Garden of Eden in Canto 28 of Purgatorio. Here he is told that God gave the Garden of Eden to man "in earnest, or as a pledge of eternal life," but man was only able to dwell there for a short time because he soon fell from grace. In the poem, the Garden of Eden is both human and divine: while it is located on earth at the top of Mt. Purgatory, it also serves as the gateway to the heavens.

Much of John Milton's Paradise Lost occurs in the Garden of Eden. Milton first introduces the Garden of Eden in Book 4 when Satan makes his first approach. His description starts with the garden’s position and exterior. He illustrates the garden as being positioned on top of a “steep wilderness” with impassable walls of vegetation. (4.133-137). Likening the garden’s enclosure to “a woodie theatre,” Milton depicts this wall as having rows of trees surpassing one another in height. (4.137-142). It extends even higher with trees adorned with an abundance of different fruits (4.147-148). Above all the other trees, Milton places the Tree of life at the highest point of Eden (4.194-195). Next to it stands the Tree of Knowledge (4.220-222).

Following Satan’s movement into the Garden, Milton shifts the focus from the exterior to the interior of Eden. First, Milton showcases the rivers and streams in Eden which pass underground and ultimately diverge into four rivers that extend beyond Eden’s boundaries. These streams form a complex water system that sustains each and every plant that grows in the garden (4.223-246). Milton concludes the initial description of the Garden of Eden by highlighting the diverse features of the garden: the lush vegetation, the serene landscapes, oases, and choruses of birds (4.246-264). William Shullenberger suggests Milton’s syntax in this passage further elaborates on Eden’s image and by mirroring the flow of water in Eden, essentially visiting each feature in the same way the dynamic water system sustains them.

In his representation of Eden, Milton maintains the tradition set by Genesis 2:15 that the Garden of Eden requires human maintenance and cultivation, which is a role God delegates to Adam and Eve. In "Milton’s Wild Garden," John R. Knott analyzes how the "wild" aspect of Milton’s Eden provides meaning and pleasure to Adam and Eve’s labor in the Garden of Eden, in addition to intensifying the overall depiction of the garden. According to Knott, it is not that the growth of vegetation in Eden needs to be kept in check. Fundamentally, he argues the wildness of Milton’s Eden provides Adam and Eve with the means to engage with the garden and participate within the human-nature order God decreed, affording them spiritual pleasure and moral discipline.

Unlike Knott, Jude Welburn argues the wildness of Milton’s Eden does need to be kept in check, and it both cultivates and unravels the balance of labor and leisure for Adam and Eve.

Nick Pici argues for the spiritual importance of tending to Eden in his ecocritical reading of Paradise Lost, “Milton’s ‘Eco-Eden:’ Place and Notions of the ‘Green’ in Paradise Lost.” Pici argues that because Eden’s landscape mirrors that of Heaven, nature is a form of God’s presence, and accordingly, Adam and Eve’s cultivation of Eden is a form of ritual worship.

The first act of Arthur Miller's 1972 play Creation of the World and Other Business is set in the Garden of Eden.

== See also ==
- Epic of Gilgamesh
- Golden Age
- Heaven in Judaism
- Hesperides
- Jannah
- Mazandaran (Shahnameh)
- Persian gardens
- Purgatorio
- Sacred garden
- The Summerland
- Tamoanchan
- Utopia
- Atemporal fall

== Bibliography ==
- Brown, John Pairman (2001). Israel and Hellas, Volume 3. Walter de Gruyter. ISBN 9783110168822.
- Cohen, Chaim (2011). "Eden". In Berlin, Adele; Grossman, Maxine (eds.). The Oxford Dictionary of the Jewish Religion. Oxford University Press. ISBN 9780199730049.
- Curtius, Ernst Robert (1953). European Literature and the Latin Middle Ages. Princeton University Press. ISBN 978-0-691-01899-7. Translated by Willard R. Trask.
- Davidson, Robert (1973). Genesis 1–11 (commentary by Davidson, R. 1987 [Reprint] ed.). Cambridge, England: Cambridge University Press. ISBN 9780521097604.
- Day, John (2014). "Problems in the Interpretation of the Story of the Garden of Eden". From Creation to Babel: Studies in Genesis 1-11. Bloomsbury Publishing. ISBN 978-0-567-37030-3.
- Levenson, Jon D. (2004). "Genesis: Introduction and Annotations". In Berlin, Adele; Brettler, Marc Zvi (eds.). The Jewish Study Bible. Oxford University Press. ISBN 9780195297515.
- Mathews, Kenneth A. (1996). Genesis. Nashville, Tennessee: Broadman & Holman Publishers. ISBN 9780805401011.
- Smith, Mark S. (2009). "Introduction". In Pitard, Wayne T. (ed.). The Ugaritic Baal Cycle, volume II. BRILL. ISBN 978-9004153486.
- Speiser, E. A. (1994). "The Rivers of Paradise". In Tsumura, D. T.; Hess, R. S. (eds.). I Studied Inscriptions from Before the Flood. Eisenbrauns. ISBN 9780931464881.
- Stordalen, Terje (2000). Echoes of Eden. Peeters. ISBN 9789042908543.
- Swarup, Paul (2006). The self-understanding of the Dead Sea Scrolls Community. A&C Black. ISBN 9780567043849.
- Tigchelaar, Eibert J. C. (1999). "Eden and Paradise: The Garden Motif in some Early Jewish Texts (1 Enoch and Other Texts Found at Qumran)". In Luttikhuizen, Gerard P. (ed.). Paradise Interpreted. Themes in Biblical narrative. Leiden: Koninklijke Brill. ISBN 90-04-11331-2.
- Willcocks, Sir William; Hormuzd Rassam. Mesopotamian Trade. Noah's Flood: The Garden of Eden, in: The Geographical Journal 35, No. 4 (April 1910). DOI: 10.2307/1777041.
