= Mowden =

Mowden may refer to the following places in England:

- Mowden, County Durham, a housing estate in Darlington
- Mowden, Essex, a hamlet
- Mowden Hall School, a school in Bywell, Northumberland
