= Mowden, Essex =

Hamlet in Essex, England

Coordinates: 51.761°N 0.577°E

Mowden
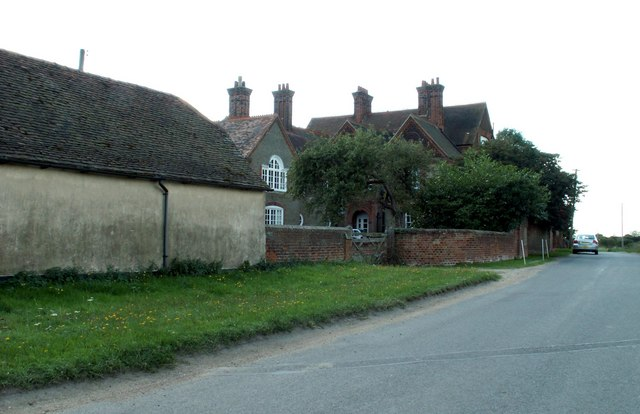
- House by Mowden Hall Farm

- Location within Essex
- Civil parish: Hatfield Peverel
- District: Braintree
- Shire county: Essex
- Region: East
- Country: England
- Sovereign state: United Kingdom

Mowden is a hamlet in the civil parish of Hatfield Peverel, in the Braintree district, in the county of Essex, England. It is about 5 miles away from the city of Chelmsford and about 1 1/2 miles away from the large villages of Boreham and Hatfield Peverel. It is also about a mile away from the main A12 road. There is also the hamlet of Nounsley nearby.
