= William Henry Helm =

English author (1860–1936)

- Born: 1860
- Died: 1936 (aged 76)
- Education: Bradfield College
- Occupation: author
- Notable work: see Works
- Spouse: Ada Emmeline Physick (m. 1881)
- Children: 2
- Parents: Rev. William Henry Helm (father); Elizabeth Caroline Jollye (née Withington) (mother)

William Henry Helm (1860–1936) was an English writer known for well-reviewed non-fiction books like Jane Austen and her Country-House Comedy (1909) and Homes of the Past (1921).

== Early life and writing ==
His parents were the Rev. William Henry Helm and Elizabeth Caroline Jollye (née Withington). His father, son of Charles Helm, a solicitor in Worcester, was headmaster of King's School, Worcester, and died not long after the marriage. His mother was the daughter of Thomas Scholes Withington (died 1838), a cotton broker in Liverpool.

Helm was educated at Bradfield College. He joined the staff of The Morning Post in 1882. He was noted in 1885 for writing "a short but bright and original story of the days of Queen Anne" in the Christmas 1884 special issue of the Weekly Freeman titled "How George Stanley Settled his Bill". He became a columnist for The Morning Post, and speaking at the 1887 annual dinner of the London Association of Correctors of the Press, "said that as a reviewer he was not ashamed to stand up and say he belonged to that much-abused fraternity", speculating that even the ghosts of dead writers would complain of their depictions by modern reviewers.

== Primary publishing career ==
In 1900, Helm published a series of "Studies in Style" examining the writing styles of various authors, and was described in The Morning Post as having "hit on the happy idea of reproducing them with just sufficient caricature to make apparent to the simplest intelligence the affectation, or the vulgarity, or the idiosyncracy of the particular writer". The review found the work to be "ample evidence of Mr. Helm's fitness for the delicate task he undertook". A 1904 book, The Blue Fox, parodying the style of Guy Boothby, was less successful, with one review finding that it "starts well with a clever burlesque of the modern Anglo-American alliance between title and dollars", but later "misses fire somehow", being not sufficiently extravagant. Helm next wrote about Honoré de Balzac in the book, Aspects of Balzac in London in 1905.

=== Jane Austen and Her Country-House Comedy (1909) ===
In 1909, it was announced that Helm was "writing a critical monograph on 'Jane Austen,' based on her novels and letters". The book, Jane Austen and her Country-house Comedy, was published that year, with The Athenaeum saying of it:

It is a favourite dogma nowadays with the superior person that literary criticism has nothing to do with biography, and that in estimating an author's work no attention should be paid to the facts of his life. The method adopted by Mr. Helm is in direct opposition to this theory. In the meagre annals of Jane Austen's career he diligently seeks for the raw material of her novels, and from the novels in turn deduces the realities of her personal experience. We have nothing to say against this system of double entry. In one or two instances, indeed, we should be inclined to carry it further than Mr. Helm.

The Book News Monthly wrote that Helm "takes up first the dominant qualities in Jane Austen's works, dilating upon her 'abiding freshness' and comparing her with Balzac and Charlotte Bronte. He then studies her equipment, going into the matter of her education and her preparation for writing". The Guardian described it as demonstrating "critical discernment and literary knowledge". In the 21st century, literary scholar Laurence W. Mazzeno wrote that the book was "probably best described as a transitional work between the appreciations offered by the Austen family and many Victorians, and the more systematic critical examinations that would follow in the coming decades". Mazzano described Helm as being "of a generation still interested in the way Austen depicted the fashions and customs of her day", and noted that Helm considered Austen "a neglected classic", and sought to "reclaim for her a place among England's great authors".

In 1910, after 27 years with The Morning Post, Helm was dismissed during a rearrangement of the staff. He sued, alleging wrongful dismissal and asserting that letters from former manager Edward Eden Peacock would demonstrate that the paper had a practice of providing for members of the literary staff dismissed after some number of years with the paper. Helm's 1912 book on Charles Dickens was deemed "an able and expert introduction on Dickens' life and works".

=== Homes of the Past (1921) ===
In 1919, Helm proposed "the selection and preservation some typical houses, each of which shall be an original example of a particular period in our history", along with their furnishings and other contents, so that people could visit them and learn what life during those periods was like. He further stated that he was preparing a book in support of this plan, for which "[m]any pen-and-ink drawings have already been prepared, in illustration of my text, by a very capable artist".

Fine arts expert Archibald Cecil Chappelow illustrated the well-received 1921 book Homes of the Past, by Helm. The book was a favorite of publisher John Lane, and was "a magnificent volume". The book review in The Observer stated: "Not only is this book pleasantly written, but it is much enhanced in attractiveness by the pen-and-ink drawings by Mr. A. C. Chappelow, who has a most affectionate touch for old architecture and furnishing".

In later life, Helm was described as "a distinguished East-Anglian antiquary who is also an ardent Francophile. Though he loves France, and speaks French easily, it cannot be denied that his accent leaves something to be desired". Helm once described giving a lecture in French to an audience of French nationals, after which one of them approached him and politely asked exactly what part of France Helm came from.

== Works ==
- Studies in Style (1900)
- The Blue Fox (1904)
- Aspects of Balzac (1905)
- Jane Austen and her Country-house Comedy (1909)
- Thomas Love Peacock (1911)
- Charles Dickens (1912)
- Vigée-Lebrun, 1755-1842: Her Life, Works, and Friendships (1915)
- Homes of the Past (1921)

== Personal life and death ==
Helm married Ada Emmeline Physick, youngest daughter of E. J. Physick, the sculptor, in 1881. They had two children. Helm died in 1936, at the age of 76.
