= Murder of Allan Chappelow =

English writer and photographer (1919–2006)

Allan Chappelow
- Born: Allan Gordon Chappelow; 20 August 1919; Copenhagen, Denmark
- Died: Between 8 May and 14 June 2006 (aged 87); Hampstead, London
- Cause of death: Murdered
- Known for: Works on George Bernard Shaw

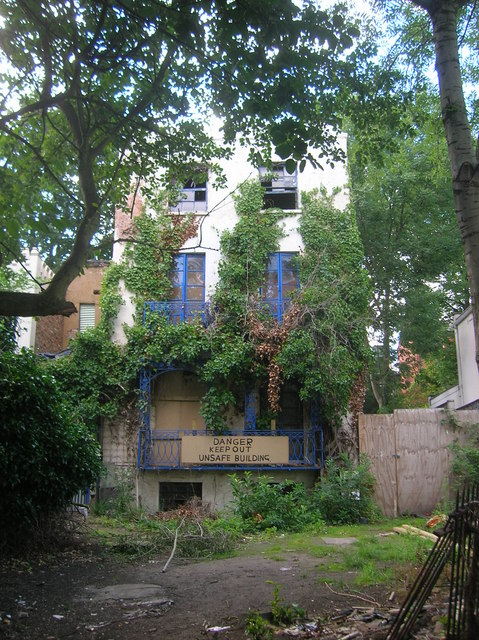
Chappelow's residence, 9 Downshire Hill in Hampstead in 2007.

Allan Gordon Chappelow FRSA (20 August 1919 – May/June 2006) was an English writer and photographer who lived in Hampstead, north London. He wrote books on George Bernard Shaw and specialised in portraits of writers and musicians. He was found dead at his house in 2006 and a Chinese national, Wang Yam, was convicted of his murder at a retrial in 2009.

== Life ==
Chappelow was born on 20 August 1919, the son of wealthy decorator, upholsterer, and fine art consultant Archibald Cecil Chappelow, and Karen Ragnhild Permin of Hillerød (located north of Copenhagen), whom his father had met while working as a lecturer at Copenhagen University. Chappelow moved with his family to Hampstead at the age of 14, to the house, 9 Downshire Hill, in which he lived for the rest of his life except for his school and student years. He was educated at Oundle School near Peterborough. In the Second World War he was a conscientious objector (as his uncle, Eric Chappelow, had famously been in the First World War), working on a farm in Hampshire. He went on to study moral sciences at Trinity College, Cambridge between 1946 and 1949, taking an M.A. and twice being a prizeman. In the 1950s, he worked as a photographer for the Daily Mail and The Daily Telegraph. Afterwards he became a freelance photographer and writer.

As a photographer, Chappelow specialised in portraits of leading literary and theatrical figures and musicians. In 1950, he visited George Bernard Shaw at Ayot St. Lawrence and took the last known photographs of the playwright. Chappelow's books included Russian Holiday (London, George Harrap, 1955) – he was a member of the first party of 'ordinary tourists' to be allowed to visit the USSR after the Second World War. His principal works on Shaw are Shaw the Villager and Human Being – a Biographical symposium, with a preface by Dame Sybil Thorndike (1962), and Shaw – the 'Chucker-Out' (1969, ISBN 0-404-08359-5).

== Murder ==
A recluse and (according to media reports) a millionaire, the elderly Chappelow was found murdered in his house after a sum of money was discovered to have gone missing from his bank account. In October 2006, a British citizen of Chinese birth, Wang Yam, a financial trader also resident in Hampstead, was arrested in Switzerland and charged with the murder. Wang had worked as an informant for MI6, and had been granted refugee status in 1992 after fleeing China from Hong Kong following the 1989 Tiananmen Square protests.

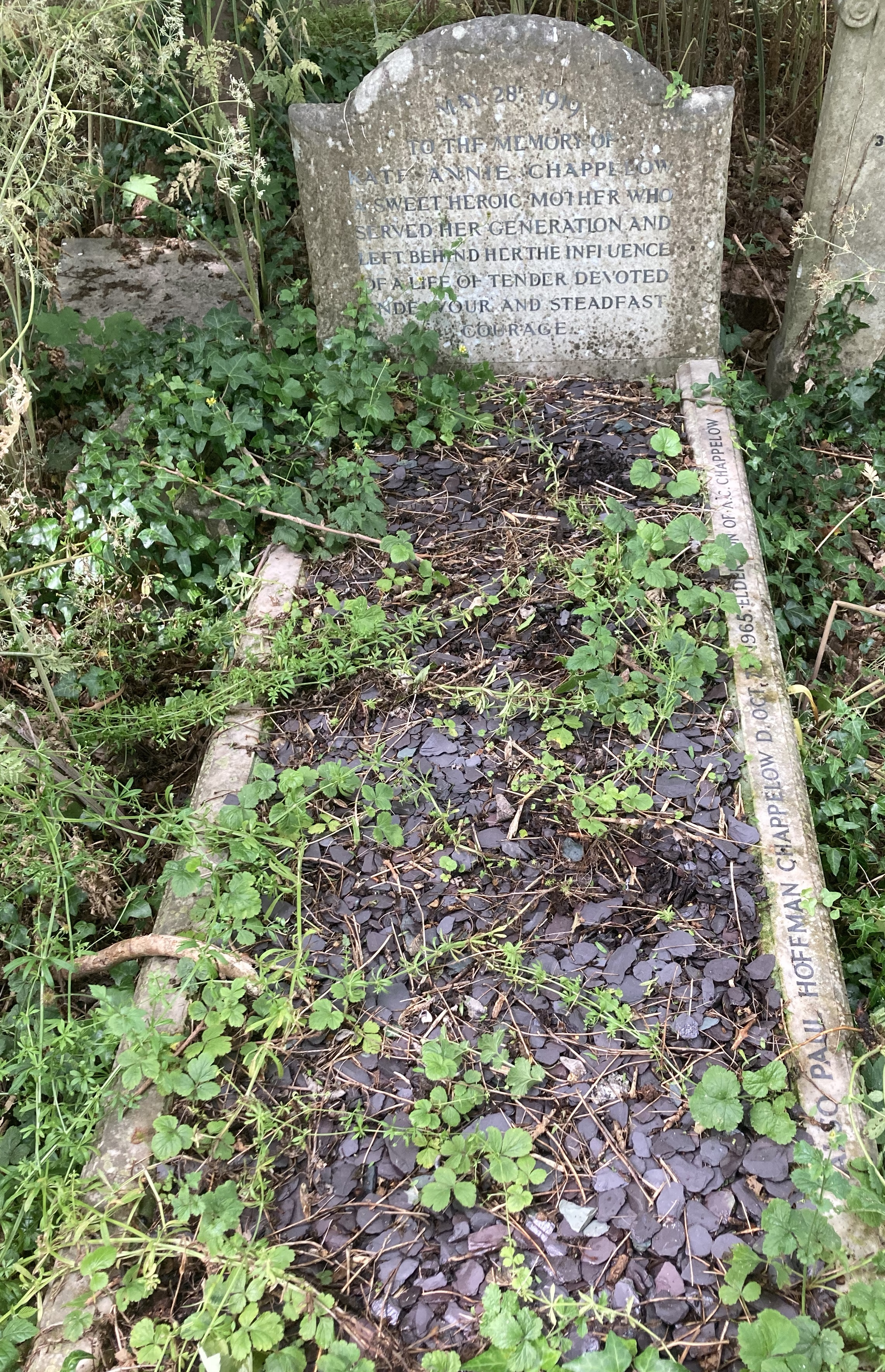
Grave of Allan Chappelow in Highgate Cemetery

Chappelow's Grade II listed house was sold for £4.1m, and the new owners submitted plans for it to be refurbished.

Chappelow was buried with his parents on the east side of Highgate Cemetery.

== Legal and security issues ==
=== First trial ===
In December 2007, the Crown Prosecution Service indicated it would ask for Wang's trial for murder, burglary and deception to be held 'in camera'. This would make it the first UK murder trial ever heard behind closed doors without access by press or public.

Before, during and after the trial, government officials made extensive efforts to ensure Wang's ties to MI6 remained secret. A Public Interest Immunity (PII) certificate was sought by the Home Secretary Jacqui Smith on the basis of protecting national security interests and “to protect witnesses”. On 14 January 2008, the trial judge granted the gagging order and the trial was scheduled to start on 28 January. A further order was made under the Contempt of Court Act 1981 prohibiting the press and media from all speculation as to the reasons for parts of the trial being held in private. All that could be reported during the trial was that the MI6 demanded secrecy, that Wang was a "low-level informant", and that "part of his defence rested on his activities in that role"

In the Court of Appeal on 28 January, the gagging order was upheld, with the Lord Chief Justice insisting that a fair trial would be possible even if some or all of it was held 'in camera'.

On 28 March, the jury retired to consider its verdict. On 31 March, Yam was found guilty of stealing £20,000 by deception, and on 1 April also found guilty of handling stolen goods. The jury was discharged after failing to reach verdicts on the charges of burglary and murder.

Wang had participated in the Chinese democracy movement, and was one of the organizers of the 1989 Tiananmen Square protests. Following a CCP crackdown on the organisers, Wang fled to Britain via Hong Kong and was naturalized as a UK citizen in 1998. Wang had subsequently declared his bankruptcy in September 2004, in which debts of £1.1 million were revealed, indicating that he was experiencing severe financial difficulties. Wang had also been due to be evicted from his Hampstead home in June 2006, because of his outstanding rent arrears.

=== Retrial ===
A retrial of Wang Yam on the charge of murder was set for 13 October 2008. The prosecution presented eight weeks of evidence in public. This evidence included CCTV footage of Yam using Chappelow's bank card, and evidence of Yam paying a restaurant bill. The entirety of the defence case in the retrial was held in camera.

The Old Bailey judge overseeing the case spent early January 2009 summarising the case, before sending out the jury to deliberate on 9 January. Yam was convicted of murder on 16 January 2009; he was sentenced to life imprisonment, serving a minimum of 20 years.

=== Case review ===
In 2014, the Criminal Case Review Commission referred Yam's case to the Court of Appeal after one of Chappelow's neighbours came forward with claims that he had been threatened by a man with a knife in the area after Yam's arrest, an encounter he had reported to the police who had not in turn informed Yam's defence team. However, the Court of Appeal upheld the conviction in 2017.

In 2023, the CCRC confirmed that they would review Yam's case a second time in response to new developments in DNA testing which had led to the exoneration of Andrew Malkinson earlier in the year.

== Book ==
In January 2018, a book on Chappelow and the murder trial was published: Thomas Harding's Blood On The Page, William Heinemann (London, 2018).
