= Telassar =

Biblical place

Telassar (Tel-as'sar) is mentioned three times in the Bible. First in 2 Kings 19:12 (or according to the Greek Septuagint, 4 Kings 19:12), then in Isaiah 37:12 and in Ezekiel 27:23.

According to Rashi, Eden is the name of a kingdom.

According to those two scriptures, Tel-assar was a place inhabited by "the people of Eden" and is mentioned along with Gozan and Haran, which are in northern Mesopotamia, and Rezeph, the exact location of which is not known, several places having had this name. One such site, thought by some to have been part of an ancient district, is identified with modern Rusa’feh, located West of the Euphrates about 145 km (90 mi) South of modern Haran. It is thus in the vicinity of the suggested site of Gozan, with which Rezeph is mentioned. Sennacherib boasted, through his messengers, that the gods worshiped by the people of these places had been unable to deliver them from his forefathers. This area concurs with T. G. Pinches' etymological explanation in the International Standard Bible Encyclopedia as follows:

"As Telassar was inhabited by the 'children of Eden,' and is mentioned with Gozan, Haran, and Rezeph, in Western Mesopotamia, it has been suggested that it lay in Bit Adini, "the House of Adinu," or Betheden, in the same direction, between the Euphrates and the Belikh. A place named Til-Assuri, however, is twice mentioned by Tiglath-pileser IV (Ann., 176; Slab-Inscr., II, 23), and from these passages it would seem to have lain near enough to the Assyrian border to be annexed. The king states that he made there holy sacrifices to Merodach, whose seat it was. It was inhabited by Babylonians (whose home was the Edinu or "plain" see EDEN). Esarhaddon, Sennacherib's son, who likewise conquered the place, writes the name Til-Asurri, and states that the people of Mihranu called it Pitanu. Its inhabitants, he says, were people of Barnaku.
