= Archibald Cecil Chappelow =

British decorator, upholsterer, illustrator and lecturer

Archibald Chappelow
- Born: Archibald Cecil Chappelow; 3 August 1886; Pimlico, London, England
- Died: 25 September 1976 (aged 90); London, England
- Notable work: illustrations for William Henry Helm's Homes of the Past (1921); The Old Home in England AD 1100–1830 (1953)
- Spouse: Karen Ragnhild Permin (m. 1914)
- Children: 2, including Allan
- Parents: George Chappelow (father); Kate Chappelow (mother)
- Relatives: Eric Chappelow; Grace Chappelow

Archibald Cecil Chappelow (3 August 1886 – 25 September 1976) was a British decorator, upholsterer, illustrator, and lecturer, and later in life a fine art consultant. Chappelow received praise for his illustration of the well-received 1921 book Homes of the Past, by William Henry Helm. He was elected a Fellow of the Royal Society of Arts in 1937, and published The Old Home in England AD 1100-1830 in 1953.

== Early life, education, and career ==
Born in Pimlico, London, England, to George and Kate Chappelow, he was the older brother of poet and World War I conscientious objector Eric Chappelow, and a cousin of the suffragist Grace Chappelow. Chappelow followed his father into the home building and decorating profession in the firm of George Chappelow & Son, until the threat of war embroiled England. He was "[k]een to avoid military service at the outbreak of the First World War", and therefore "moved to Denmark, which remained neutral throughout the hostilities". This contrasted with the route taken by Chappelow's brother, Eric, who refused to fight and was jailed in England during the war, stirring the support of several notable figures, and eventually being released to serve in an ambulance unit.

In Denmark, Chappelow became a teacher at the University of Copenhagen, where he taught subjects including a course on antiques restoration. Chappelow returned to London with a new Dutch family "within six months of the war's end", moving into his father's home in Hampstead and returning to work in his father's firm. Clients of the firm "included the theatres, galleries, restaurants and clubs of London's West End".

== Illustration, writing, and other activities ==
Chappelow illustrated the well-received 1921 book Homes of the Past, by William Henry Helm. Helm referred to Chappelow's work in a 1919 letter to The Times proposing "the selection and preservation of some typical houses, each of which shall be an original example of a particular period in our history", stating that he was preparing a book in support of this plan, for which "[m]any pen-and-ink drawings have already been prepared, in illustration of my text, by a very capable artist". The book became a favorite of publisher John Lane, and was described as "profusely illustrated from pen-and-ink drawings by A. C. Chappelow". The book review in The Observer stated: "Not only is this book pleasantly written, but it is much enhanced in attractiveness by the pen-and-ink drawings by Mr. A. C. Chappelow, who has a most affectionate touch for old architecture and furnishing".

Chappelow was a favorite student of British assyriologist Theophilus Pinches, who died in 1934 and "bequeathed much of his large personal collection of cuneiform tablets" to Chappelow. Chappelow was elected Fellow of the Royal Society of Arts on 10 May 1937. Chappelow also maintained a friendship with Egyptologist Alan Gardiner, with one publication describing Chappelow as "Gardiner's old tennis partner".

In 1953, Chappelow wrote and illustrated a sequel of sorts to Helm's Homes of the Past, titled The Old Home in England AD 1100-1830: A Running Commentary on the Life of the Times, the Home and Its Furniture, which was well-reviewed in Apollo Magazine the following year. In 1956, Chappelow wrote an evaluation of the Isleworth Mona Lisa in Apollo Magazine, supporting the assertions by John R. Eyre in the 1915 book, The Two Mona Lisas that the painting was the work of Leonardo da Vinci and stating that it "deserved recognition as a truly beautiful picture contemporaneous with that in the Louvre". Chappelow found that "the face is superbly painted, and the hands more neatly defined than those in the Louvre painting", and echoing Eyre's contention "that the Isleworth version was painted first, around 1501, whilst the better-known version of an older woman was painted some years later". Also in 1956, Chappelow participated in a forum of the Royal Society of Arts discussing "Beauty in Danger", relating to trends in architecture. In the 1960s, Chappelow used his wealth to finance his son Allan's popular books on George Bernard Shaw.

== Personal life and death ==
During his wartime residency in Denmark, Chappelow met Karen Ragnhild Permin of Hillerød, north of Copenhagen. They married on 17 November 1914, and had two sons, both born in Denmark, Paul and Allan. Paul was born with cerebral palsy, of which Chappelow would write that he "had the misfortune to be injured at birth and is a cripple. His hands are affected somewhat and his speech jerky and his walk somewhat haphazard. He is, however, nice looking, cheerful and healthy and is a great reader and a book grubber".

Chappelow's second son, Allan Chappelow (1919–2006), became a noted English writer and photographer.

Chappelow died in London at the age of 90.
