= Nounsley =

Hamlet in Essex, England

Coordinates: 51.76424°N 0.60703°E

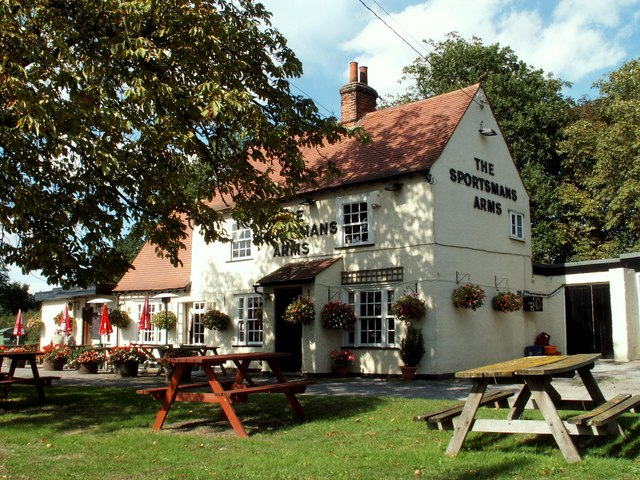
- The Sportsman’s Arms public house, Nounsley

- Location within Essex
- Area: 0.290 km^{2} (0.112 sq mi)
- Population: 681 (2018 estimate)
  - Density: 2,348/km^{2} (6,080/sq mi)
- OS grid reference: TL800105
- Civil parish: Hatfield Peverel
- District: Braintree
- Shire county: Essex
- Region: East
- Country: England
- Sovereign state: United Kingdom
- Post town: Chelmsford
- Postcode district: CM3
- Police: Essex
- Fire: Essex
- Ambulance: East of England
- UK Parliament: Braintree

Nounsley is a hamlet in the civil parish of Hatfield Peverel, in the Braintree district, in the county of Essex, England. It is connected to the village of Hatfield Peverel by a hill and footpaths. In 2018 it had an estimated population of 681.

There is one public house, The Sportsman's Arms, and a ford across the River Ter. Hatfield Peverel Parish Council manage the small playing field and play area in the hamlet.

The hamlet has only seven roads: Ulting Road, Sportsman Road, Nounsley Road, Manor Road, Priory Farm Road, Priory Close and Peverel Avenue. In the winter of 1962–63, snow on Nounsley Hill cut off the village to wheeled traffic for three days.

The number 73 bus (provided by First) passes through the village travelling from Chelmsford to Maldon stopping at the corner of Ulting Road and Nounsley Road. The route was previously cancelled but has since 1999 been run under public subsidy.

The village was home to Grace Chappelow during 1910, when she and 119 other suffragettes planned a raid on the House of Commons.

The village was known as a poultry producing area, and was described in a 1972 development plan,

has developed more as an isolated housing estate than a village

Iron Age, Belgic and Roman pottery was found at the site of Nounsley's brickfield, which were displayed at Colchester Museum.

The village has been home to a solids diverter station for the movement of sewage since 1966.
