= Theophilus Pinches =

English Assyriologist (1856–1934)

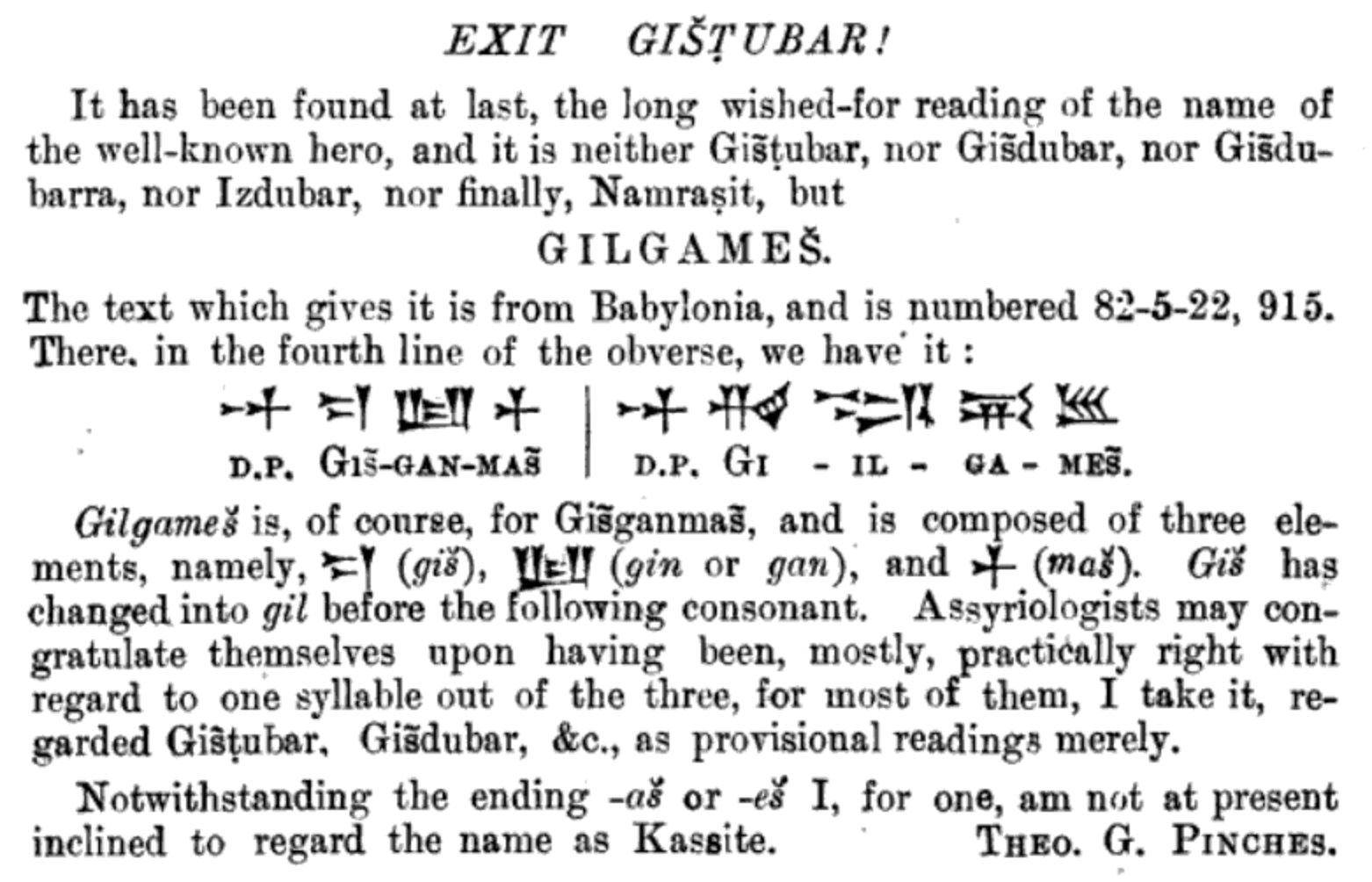
Exit Gišțubar! Theophilus Pinches' 1890 publication of the correct name of Gilgamesh

Theophilus Goldridge Pinches M.R.A.S. (1856 – 6 June 1934 Muswell Hill, London), was an English Assyriologist.

== Life and career ==
Pinches was originally employed in father's business as a die-sinker, but, following an amateur interest in cuneiform inscriptions, joined the staff of the British Museum in 1878, working there as assistant then curator till retirement in 1900. He was lecturer in Assyriology at University College London and at the University of Liverpool till 1932 or 1933.

During his tenure at the Egyptian and Assyrian Department, British Museum, he gave assistance to scholars including Abraham Sachs and taught at London University. It was largely due to his "painstaking work" during his time as assistant keeper at the British Museum between 1895 and 1900, that many pieces acquired by the museum were joined again. He also translated some Babylonian tablets which related to the Battle of the Vale of Siddim. He was one of the editors of The Babylonian and Oriental Record from 1886. In 1890, Pinches discovered and published the correct reading of the name of Gilgamesh, instead of Izdubar. The document known as Chronicle P - providing important historical information despite its bad condition - is named for Pinches, who was its first editor.

Pinches died in 1934 and "bequeathed much of his large personal collection of cuneiform tablets" to a favourite student, Archibald Cecil Chappelow.

== Works ==
- Theophilus Goldridge Pinches (1910). An outline of Assyrian grammar: with a short sign-list, a list of late Babylonian forms of characters, and autographic reproductions of texts. H.J. Glaisher. p. 64.
- Texts in the Babylonian wedge-writing, 1880
- The Religion of Babylonia and Assyria, 1906
- The Old Testament in the Light of the Historical Records and Legends of Assyria and Babylonia, 1908
