= Hatfield Peverel =

Village in Essex, England

Coordinates: 51.76906°N 0.59281°E

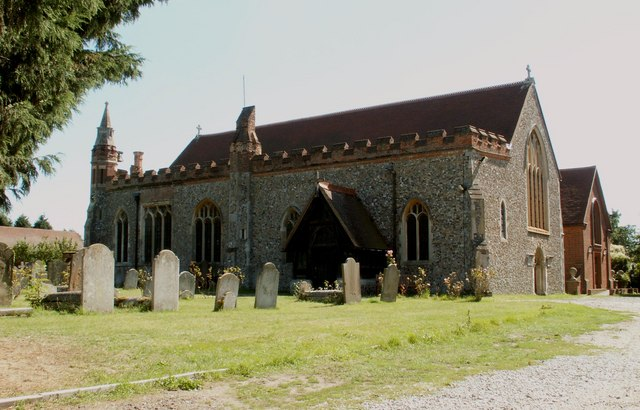
- St. Andrew's church, Hatfield Peverel

- Location within Essex
- Area: 1.090 km^{2} (0.421 sq mi)
- Population: 4,285 (Parish, 2021); 3,797 (Built up area, 2021)
  - Density: 3,931/km^{2} (10,180/sq mi)
- OS grid reference: TL7911
- District: Braintree
- Shire county: Essex
- Region: East
- Country: England
- Sovereign state: United Kingdom
- Post town: CHELMSFORD
- Postcode district: CM3
- Dialling code: 01245
- Police: Essex
- Fire: Essex
- Ambulance: East of England
- UK Parliament: Witham

Hatfield Peverel is a village and civil parish at the centre of Essex, England. It is located 6 miles (10 km) north-east from Chelmsford, the nearest large city, to which it is connected by road and rail. The parish includes the hamlets of Nounsley and Mowden. Hatfield means a 'heathery space in the forest'; Peverel refers to William Peverel, the Norman knight granted lands in the area by William the Conqueror after the Norman invasion of 1066. Sited on high ground east of the River Ter, between Boreham and Witham on the A12, it is situated in the southern extremity of the Braintree District Council area (to which it elects two members).

At the 2021 census the parish had a population of 4,285 and the built up area had a population of 3,797.

Hatfield Peverel is the site of a priory founded by the Saxon Ingelrica, wife of Ranulph Peverel and reputed to be the mistress of William the Conqueror, to atone for her sins, and dissolved by Henry VIII.

== Local amenities ==
The parish church, St Andrew's (Church of England) is the surviving fragment of the Norman priory church nave. There is also a Methodist Church.

The village has a junior school, St. Andrew's C of E, and an adjacent infant school; Scout and Guide organisations, with headquarters in Church Road; a post office; a library; and a doctors' surgery.

== Economy ==
Hatfield Peverel was the site of an Arla Foods factory which closed in July 2016; primarily, it used to produce dairy products. The factory was subsequently demolished and there are plans to build up to 177 houses on the former site. There are six public houses, a farm shop and other retail outlets. Main housing areas include Berwick Place, Crix, Hatfield Place, Hatfield Wick and The Priory.

== Transport ==
Hatfield Peverel railway station is on the Great Eastern Main Line. It is served by Greater Anglia services from London Liverpool Street to Colchester and Ipswich.

The station is seen in the 1976 film Exposé starring Linda Hayden and Fiona Richmond, along with views of the surrounding countryside.

The village is served by First Essex's route 71 bus service which runs between Chelmsford and Colchester.

== Sport ==
Hatfield Peverel Football Club has been established since 1903; it was originally based at the Duke of Wellington public house, before moving to the Recreation Ground in 1936. The club are now based on the outskirts of the village at a former gravel pit at Wickham Bishops Road and fields men's, ladies' and junior teams.

Hatfield Peverel Cricket Club has been established since 1885. The club is based at the Church Road Ground, the club offers a range of teams: HPCC 1st XI & HPCC 2nd XI (Mid Essex Cricket League), Friendly Teams - The Famous Allstars T20 team and HPCC Sunday XI.

== Agnes Waterhouse ==
Hatfield Peverel was home to Agnes Waterhouse, one of the first women executed for witchcraft in England under Queen Elizabeth I. Known locally as Mother Waterhouse, she was accused of witchcraft by Elizabeth Frauncis, who may have been her sister, and a child named Agnes Browne. The 1566 trial inspired the first entry into a literary body of pamphlets on witch trials, or, salacious texts published cheaply for general audiences.

According to this pamphlet, Frauncis admitted to having a familiar named Sathan, a cat to whom she fed drops of her blood in return for wishes that did harm to others. (This case was also the first to popularise the concept of a witch's familiar during the witch trials in England.) Frauncis eventually sold the cat to Mother Waterhouse. She and her daughter Joan confessed to using the cat for sorcery, culminating in the death of a man named William Fynne and the torment of a child named Agnes Browne. It is likely that Agnes Waterhouse confessed to the crime in order to save the life of her daughter. Agnes was executed two days after the trial based on the evidence and word of the child.
