= Eric Chappelow =

English poet and World War I conscientious objector

Eric Barry Wilfred Chappelow
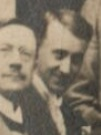
- Eric Chappelow (right), photographed by Philip Morrell in 1916, with Henry William Massingham.
- Born: 7 October 1890; St George Hanover Square, London, England
- Died: 28 November 1957 (aged 67); Stepney, London, England
- Occupations: Clerk, poet
- Writing career
- Language: English
- Years active: 1916–1957
- Genre: Classical themes

Eric Barry Wilfred Chappelow (7 October 1890 – 28 November 1957) was an English poet and conscientious objector during the First World War. His arrest and harsh treatment during four months of imprisonment garnered support from prominent people in Britain, including Chappelow's connections within the literary community. A campaign for his release was supported by Bertrand Russell, W. B. Yeats, and George Bernard Shaw. His arrest and the treatment were highlighted in the House of Commons by the Liberal MP Philip Morrell.

Prior to his arrest, Chappelow had gained a measure of recognition for his first volume of poetry, which was published in early 1916. At that time, he was serving as a clerk to a London County Council and had been exempted from service in the military during the First World War as a conscientious objector. Not long after his exemption was granted, it was rescinded and he was arrested in April for refusing to serve. A photograph of Chappelow in a barracks yard wearing nothing but a blanket fastened around him with a belt made front page news. Despite efforts on his behalf, Chappelow was imprisoned under harsh conditions in Wandsworth prison for four months. He was eventually released in the custody of Philip and Lady Ottoline Morrell to serve in a Friends' Ambulance Unit in England. After the war, Chappelow continued writing essays and poetry until his death, and in 1937 was elected a Fellow of the Royal Society of Arts. He earned a literary prize for one of his poems published in 1945.

== Early life and career ==
Eric Barry Wilfred Chappelow was born in St George Hanover Square, London, England, to George and Kate Chappelow. He was a brother of illustrator and fine arts expert Archibald Cecil Chappelow, and a cousin of the suffragist Grace Chappelow. On 27 October 1913, Chappelow became a clerk to the education committee of the London County Council. (Note: London County Council, Minutes of Proceedings, Vol. 2 (1913) p. 797 - "To fill vacancies for second-class clerks in the education officer's department we have Selected candidates from the list of examinees. We recommend— That, subject to their passing the usual medical examination and to their references proving satisfactory, Mr. Eric Tunbridge Havell and Mr. Eric Barry Wilfred Chappelow be appointed in section (c) of the second class in the education officer's department, as from 20th and 27th October 1913, respectively, each at the commencing salary of £80 a year.") Early in 1916, Chappelow published his first poetry collection, Joy and the Year, which was moderately well-reviewed in the literary magazine The Athenæum, which said:

In style and metrical finish Mr. Chappelow, a young writer, decidedly rises above the very respectable standard of technique attained by much of the minor verse published nowadays. He is not strikingly original; there is no new note to be detected. But the unaffected sincerity and depth of his feeling give harmonious music and an occasional touch of splendour to his diction, which is always dignified. Love, in the shape of friendship between man and woman, is rarely sung with such beauty and ideality. Mr. Chappelow is excellent at a villanelle.

== World War I and imprisonment ==
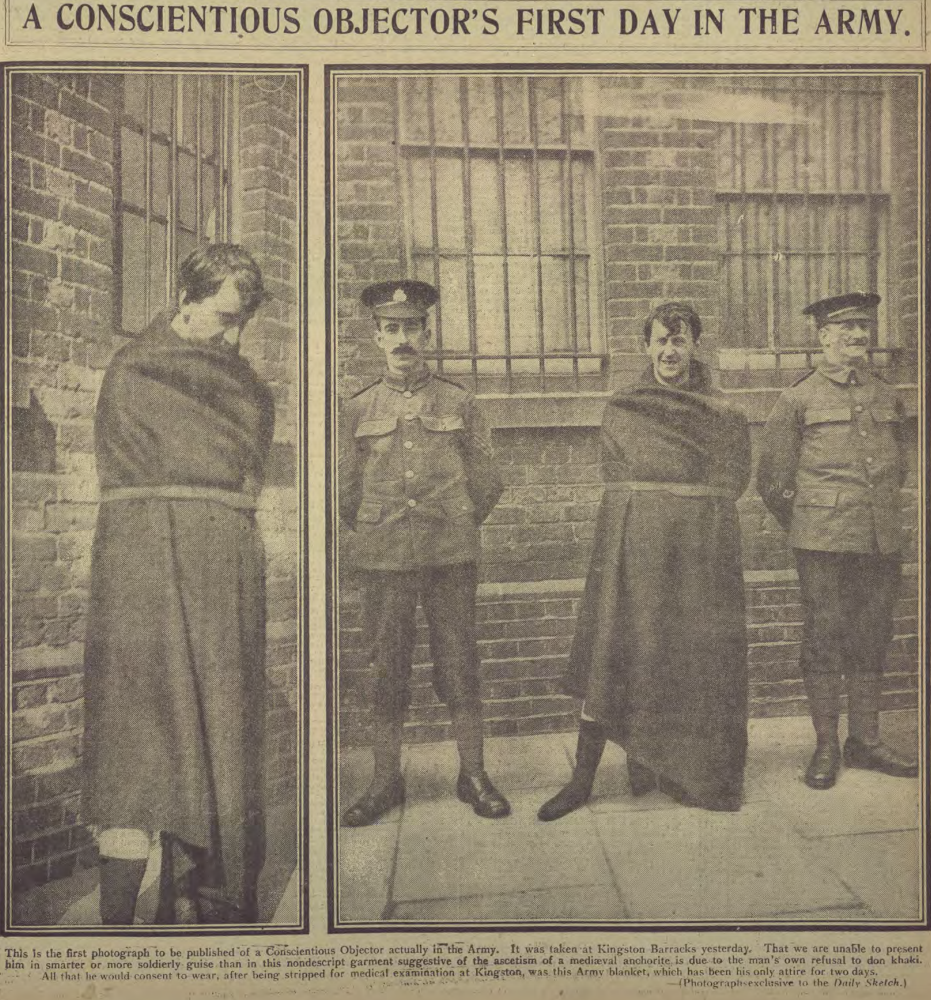
Two photographs of Chappelow on the cover of the Daily Sketch, 14 April 1916.

In March 1916, at the outset of the introduction of compulsory service in World War I, Chappelow was "exempted as a conscientious objector", with a certificate of exemption formally being granted by the Barnes and Mortlake local tribunal on 5 April 1916. Chappelow's brother Archibald had already taken a different route to avoid service, moving to Denmark, which "remained neutral throughout the hostilities". Chappelow's exemption was challenged by a local military authority, and he was "sent before a tribunal, who could see no reason to grant him exemption for his spiritual and political beliefs". His exemption was rescinded on appeal, after which Chappelow was "then reclaimed for army noncombatant service, which he refused". Chappelow was "arrested only three and a half hours after the time that he should have presented himself", a point as to which he later complained, and was taken to Kingston Barracks, where he was charged with offences including cowardice and treason.

He refused to undress for a medical examination, and after being undressed by force, refused to put on a military uniform. A photograph of Chappelow appeared on the cover of the 14 April 1916 edition of the national tabloid newspaper, Daily Sketch, where he was shown being forced to stand in a barrack yard adjacent to a public street, wearing a blanket secured with a belt, likely as punishment for refusing to wear a uniform. One account states:

He was arrested, taken to an army barracks and told to put on a uniform; when he refused, he was held down, stripped by the guards and forced into khaki. As soon as they let him go, he pulled the uniform off again. The guards seized a blanket, strapped it round him, manacled his hands and took him to the orderly room, where a sergeant, ridiculing his appearance, took a photograph of him which found its way into the Daily Sketch.

Chappelow was reported to have also "appeared at his court martial in a prison blanket, having spent many weeks without clothes", although another report stated that he appeared in at least one proceeding in khaki. Chappelow's lawyer argued that he was a civilian, and in a certified occupation as a clerk to a government committee, and that he was "willing to do work of national importance outside the provisions of the Military Service Act".

Chappelow's case quickly became well known. Chappelow himself wrote to lawyer Charles P. Sanger, a friend of the pacifist Bertrand Russell, giving "a horrifying description of the physical and psychological abuse to which he was subjected". Russell "took up his case with various influential people", including the scholar Gilbert Murray, who agreed to help. The poet W. B. Yeats also supported the cause, with Russell and Yeats writing to ask the playwright George Bernard Shaw to seek support for Chappelow within the government. Shaw "vainly pressed the case with a Labour member of the Cabinet, Arthur Henderson", but Henderson "declined to take any action". On 27 May 1916, Shaw published an article in a sympathetic magazine, Nation, whose publisher was Shaw's friend Henry William Massingham, "using Chappelow as symbol of the futility of resistance and the equal futility of compliance". Russell noted that conscientious objectors, "including Chappelow have always held that there was no objection to national service, provided it was not directly concerned with the war". British Liberal politician Philip Morrell addressed the matter in the House of Commons, where he "argued that Chappelow was being subjected to mental torture".

Despite all of these efforts, Chappelow was convicted and sentenced to six months in prison; it was reported that as he was escorted to the barrack square for the sentence to be pronounced, he sang La Marseillaise. He was sent to Wandsworth prison, and with his conviction, Chappelow lost his job with the education committee. Chappelow "wrote repeatedly to friends about his fears and his terrible sense of isolation":

Chappelow was a brave man, but he was no hero by nature. He soon became miserable and frightened, writing to Charles Sanger: 'I feel I am going mad. The strain is too great... Do you think I shall come out of this alive? I have no will to live.' To keep his spirits up he sang songs in Wandsworth jail, so sweetly that even the guards stopped to listen.

While in Wandsworth, Chappelow met with another noted conscientious objector, George Frederick Dutch, who was equally ill-treated. As Chappelow withered in despondency, Russell sought further intervention from Shaw in Chappelow's case, but at this point, "Shaw replied sternly. 'Chappelow should either serve or go through with martyrdom. Martyrdom is a matter for the individual soul... you can't advise a man'". Chappelow spent four months in prison, and was paroled by September 1916, thereafter serving in a Friends' Ambulance Unit on a farm provided by Philip Morrell and Morrell's wife, Ottoline, as a sort of sanctuary for conscientious objectors. When Russell was himself later sentenced to six months in Brixton prison for his anti-war activities, he noted that he found Chappelow "unduly sentimental", and remarked in a July 1918 letter to Ottoline Morrell that he hoped not to be like Chappelow in that regard while imprisoned.

== Post-war life ==
Chappelow's treatment, and that of others who were similarly situated, led to "a national outcry and calls for reform". The government later "admitted that it had been wrong to imprison Eric and the other conscientious objectors". In her 1932 book, The Home Front, the suffragist Sylvia Pankhurst recalled seeing the photograph of Chappelow in the blanket, and commented on Chappelow's plight.

Later in life, Chappelow "wrote poetry on classical themes", and "contributed several Assyriological articles to the Journal of the Royal Asiatic Society and the Journal of the Transactions of The Victoria Institute in the 1930s". Chappelow and his brother Archibald were both elected Fellows of the Royal Society of Arts in 1937. His 1945 poetry volume, Salute to the Muse garnered several positive reviews, being described by The Library World as "sensitive and accomplished verse", and by The Poetry Review as "lavish in romantic splendours, both in style and substance". For one offering in this collection, Chappelow won the British Annual of Literature award for the best short poem. The British Annual of Literature wrote of the volume that "Mr. Chappelow can write charmingly of little things", and that "[i]t is rare to find a poet writing during the War so untouched by it as the author of this accomplished volume". Chappelow's last work was his 1957 The Tale of Perseus, with a foreword by Lady Margaret Sackville. Chappelow died in Stepney, London, on 28 November 1957, at the age of 67.
