= Grace Chappelow =

British suffragette (1884–1971)

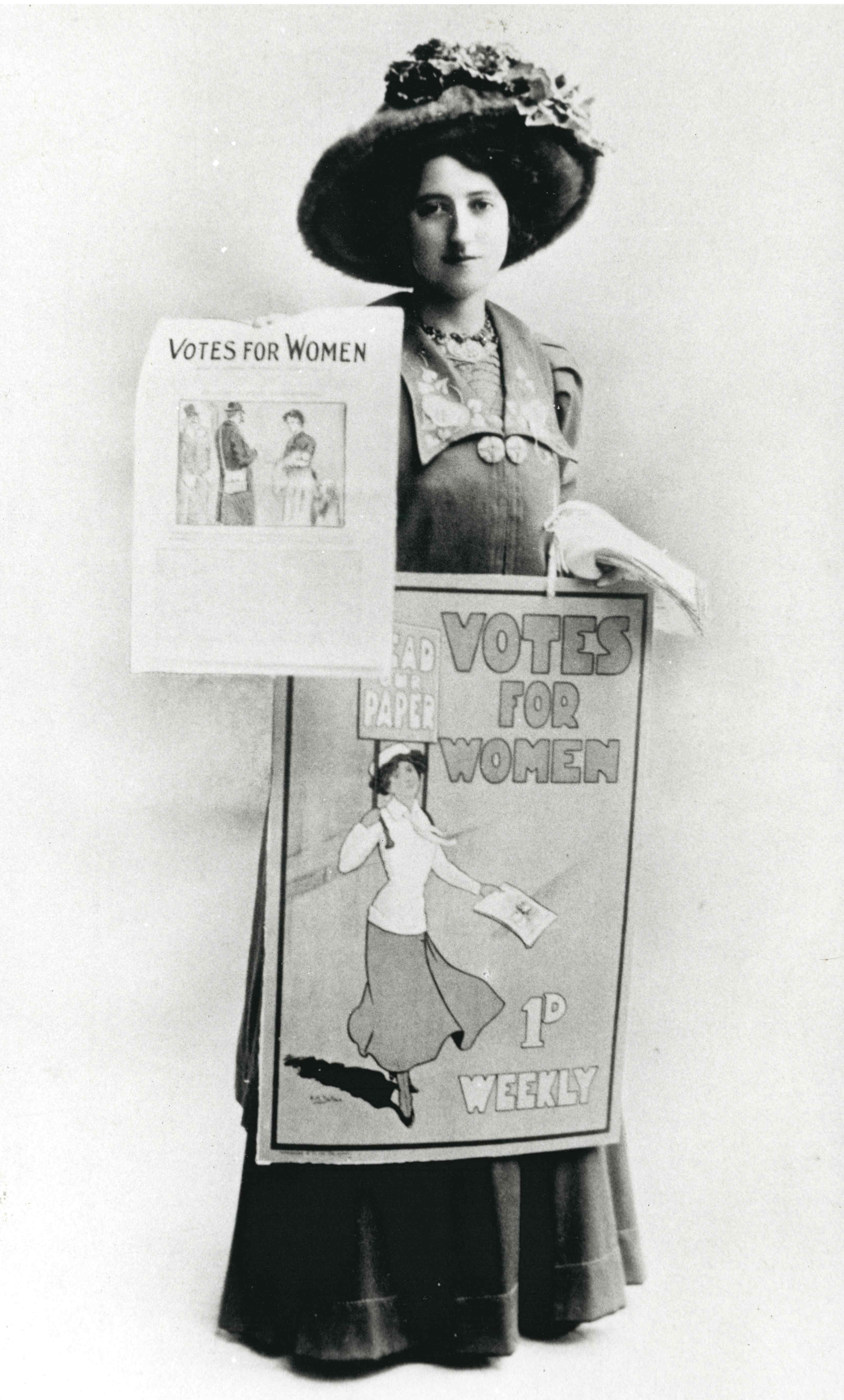
- Born: 3 February 1884; Islington, London, England
- Died: 1971 (aged 86–87)
- Education: North London Collegiate School

Grace Chappelow (3 February 1884 – 1971) was a British suffragette originally from Islington, London. A dedicated suffragette from at least 1909, she became a member of the Women's Social and Political Union (WSPU) in her twenties and spent time in Holloway Prison for breaking windows.

== Early life: 1891–1903 ==
Born in Islington, London, in 1884 to John Stephen Chappelow (a chartered accountant) and Emily Mary Elizabeth Chappelow, Chappelow enjoyed a fairly wealthy upbringing where she was sent to the North London Collegiate School, enjoyed singing, and had singing lessons with George Bernard Shaw's mother (Lucinda Elizabeth Shaw), who was an accomplished musician and who had become the school's singing mistress in January 1886. During her time at the North London Collegiate School, Dr Sophie Bryant was the headmistress, so it is possible that Chappelow was interested in the suffragette movement from an early age. She had a brother named Claude who was four years her senior.

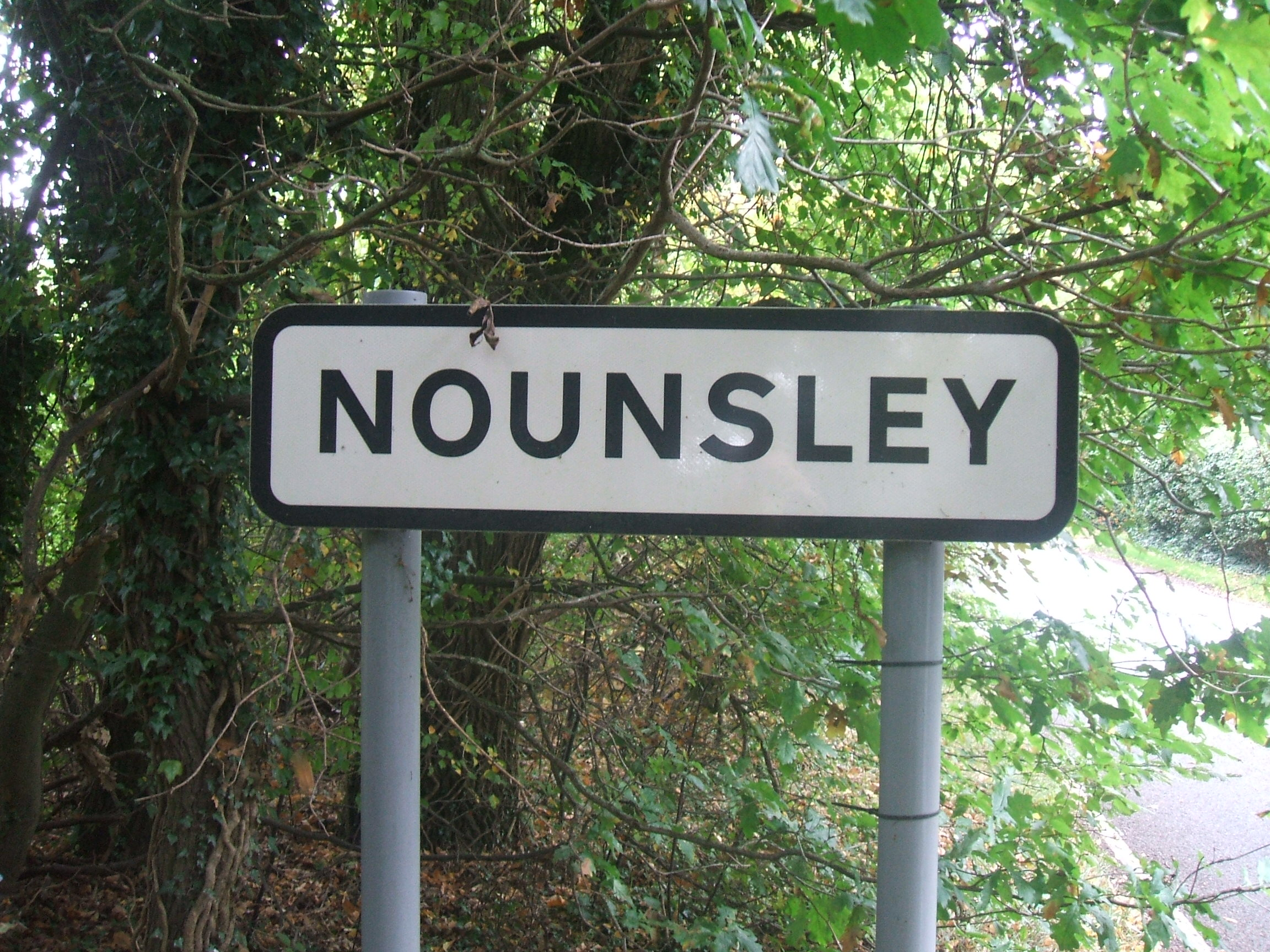
A picture of the town sign

By the age of seventeen her father had moved away from Chappelow and her mother (possibly her brother as according to the census of 1901 he was still living with the family), but remained married to Emily despite being separated. Residing in Islington until at least 1910, it wasn't until Chappelow and her mother moved to the hamlet of Nounsley near Hatfield Peverel, Essex, that Chappelow became visibly involved with the suffrage movement.

== Votes for women: 1908–1912 ==
On 19 November 1908, the suffragettes Sylvia Pankhurst, Flora Drummond and Helen Ogston visited Chelmsford as there was an upcoming Mid Essex by-election. Meeting at the Corn Exchange both Sylvia and Helen gave speeches however the crowd soon became rowdy with hecklers accosting the women, including 'pushing the trolley they were speaking from around'. The following evening Chelmsford came to a standstill as Flora Drummond leant out of the windows of The Bell Hotel, lecturing the crowds below, whilst the National Trade Defence Association also harangued the crowds. And on 27 November there were rallies at both Shire Hall and outside the Marconi building led by the Women's Freedom League and The National Union of Women's Suffrage Societies. It isn't clear if Chappelow was involved with these demonstrations or whether she was even in Essex at this point, however she'd joined the WSPU by 1909 as in September of that year was in Leicester having disrupted a meeting led by the then Home Secretary Winston Churchill at the Palace Theatre. The disruption consisted of besieging the doors after Alfred Hawkins, husband of the suffragette Alice Hawkins, was thrown out of the meeting after challenging Churchill with the question: 'Why don't they secure the vote of the women in the country? How dare you stand on a democratic platform?' Chappelow was imprisoned for five days. Chappelow might also have been in Leicester on the behalf of the WSPU who had offices at Clement's Inn, as she also sold the paper Votes for Women which was printed by St Clement's Press.

By 1910, Chappelow was definitely living in Hatfield Peverel as she's mentioned in the 25 November 1910 edition of the Essex Weekly News for her involvement in a planned raid on the House of Commons 'Miss G Chappelow, Hatfield Peverel'. The 119 suffragettes (including Chappelow), were not prosecuted after having appeared at Bow Street Magistrates' Court, therefore they were free to go. She was arrested again in 1911 for another attempted raid on the House of Commons, along with 223 other women, and in the same year her mother refused to take part in the census, scrawling 'no vote, no census'. Chappelow's friends the Rock sisters (Madeline and Dorothea), also refused to take part. 1912 was just as active as previous years, as Chappelow was mentioned again in the Essex County Chronicle for smashing panes of glass at Mansion House, home of the Lord Mayor of London. Arrested along with Madeline and Dorothea Rock and Fanny Pease, all four were imprisoned for two months, hard labour, in Holloway Prison. The Alderman did not wish to punish them in this way, but did so because he disagreed with their point of view:

The Alderman said "he was sorry to punish these women in this way, but they were acting under an entirely mistaken view of the case. There were violent as against the public, and that was bound to bring punishment in its train. He must punish them equally as he would do a poor wandering man in the street who broke windows, and they must go to prison for two months' hard labour."

In the same year, Chappelow attended (before she was imprisoned), a series of meetings held at Shire Hall, Chelmsford, in March, and presided over one where she spoke of 'the growth of the suffrage movement':

"Miss Chappelow spoke of the growth of the suffrage movement, and stated that the militant methods were more on the side the Government than on the part of the women. It was pitiable to see the number of people who said it did not matter about votes. There were many social and industrial plagues that women were suffering from, and Suffragists realised that there was a cure for these ailments, and that sure was the vote."

These meetings were arranged so that the WSPU could get their point of view across, and explain why they employed tactics such as breaking windows. However within late March many of them had been cancelled due to fears of Shire Hall being damaged.

== 1912-WWII ==
In November 1912, Chappelow was arrested by Witham Police after her dog had attacked a political agent. She refused to pay the fine of 14s, and was imprisoned for fourteen days. A later oral source describes this as being a 'Conservative agent', but this cannot be proved for certain.

In August 1928 Chappelow and her mother, possibly along with her brother Claude, moved to Ramsden Heath, Essex. Chappelow's friend, Mrs Konter, later moved in, and lived with Grace, for over 30 years. Their house had no running water so they had to use a well, and had a radio but not a television. Chappelow also loved nature and animals, and was a strict vegetarian who sold goats’ milk and owned thirteen cats. The historian, Brian Harrison, interviewed Mrs Konter, about Chappelow, in October 1976 as part of the Suffrage Interviews project, titled Oral evidence on the suffragette and suffragist movements: the Brian Harrison interviews. Another friend, Mrs Hunter, also contributed to the interview. They talk about the suffrage movement, Chappelow's role in it, her family, and her later life.

== Later life ==
In later life Chappelow continued to sell goats’ milk. She sold it via a tricycle with a box at the back as she could no longer ride a bicycle. Known locally as 'The Goat Lady', she didn't really care about her appearance and rarely washed her hair. Left a great deal of money when her mother died, she gave this to animal causes. Grace featured in a project 'Snapping the Stiletto' which uncovered stories of strong Essex Women to help dispel the negative stereotype of the 'Essex Girl'.

== Emmeline Pankhurst and Sylvia Pankhurst ==
After Chappelow's arrest and imprisonment at Holloway in 1912, she smuggled a prison cup and a knife out of the prison on her release. She also received a certificate signed by Emmeline Pankhurst on behalf of the WSPU, and a portcullis badge from Sylvia. These items currently belong to Chelmsford Museum.
