= Hockerill Halt railway station =

Former railway station in England

Hockerill Halt
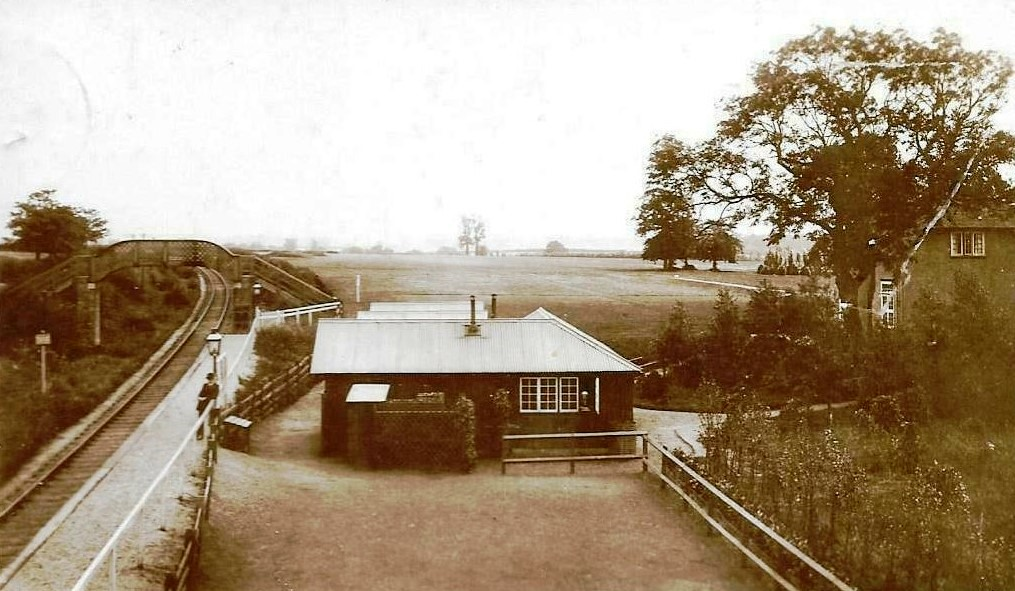
- The station in 1913

General information
- Location: Hockerill, East Hertfordshire; England
- Coordinates: 51.8695°N 0.1797°E
- Grid reference: TL502211
- Platforms: 1

Other information
- Status: Disused

History
- Original company: Great Eastern Railway
- Pre-grouping: Great Eastern Railway
- Post-grouping: London and North Eastern Railway

Key dates
- 7 November 1910: Station opened
- 3 March 1952: Station closed
Location

Hockerill Halt railway station was a station serving the Hockerill area of Bishop's Stortford in East Hertfordshire in England. The station was 1 mile 29 chains (2.19 km) from Bishop's Stortford on the Bishop's Stortford to Braintree branch line (Engineer's Line Reference BSB).

Services began on 7 November 1910 and ended on 3 March 1952.

The station along with almost all the intermediate stations on the Bishop's Stortford-Braintree branch were little used. The station was built to serve the Bishop's Stortford Golf Club but it was also open to the public.

It closed to passengers along with the rest of the branch.

The halt consisted of a low platform of made up ground, with telephone access to the signalman at Bishops Stortford.

It was partially restored in 2012 by the Friends of the Flitch Way - however this was not evident when visited in 2019.

Preceding station	Disused railways	Following station
Bishop's Stortford; Line closed, station open	Great Eastern Railway; Bishop's Stortford-Braintree Branch Line	Stane Street Halt; Line and station closed
