= Easton Lodge railway station =

Former railway station in England

Coordinates: 51.8675°N 0.327°E

Easton Lodge
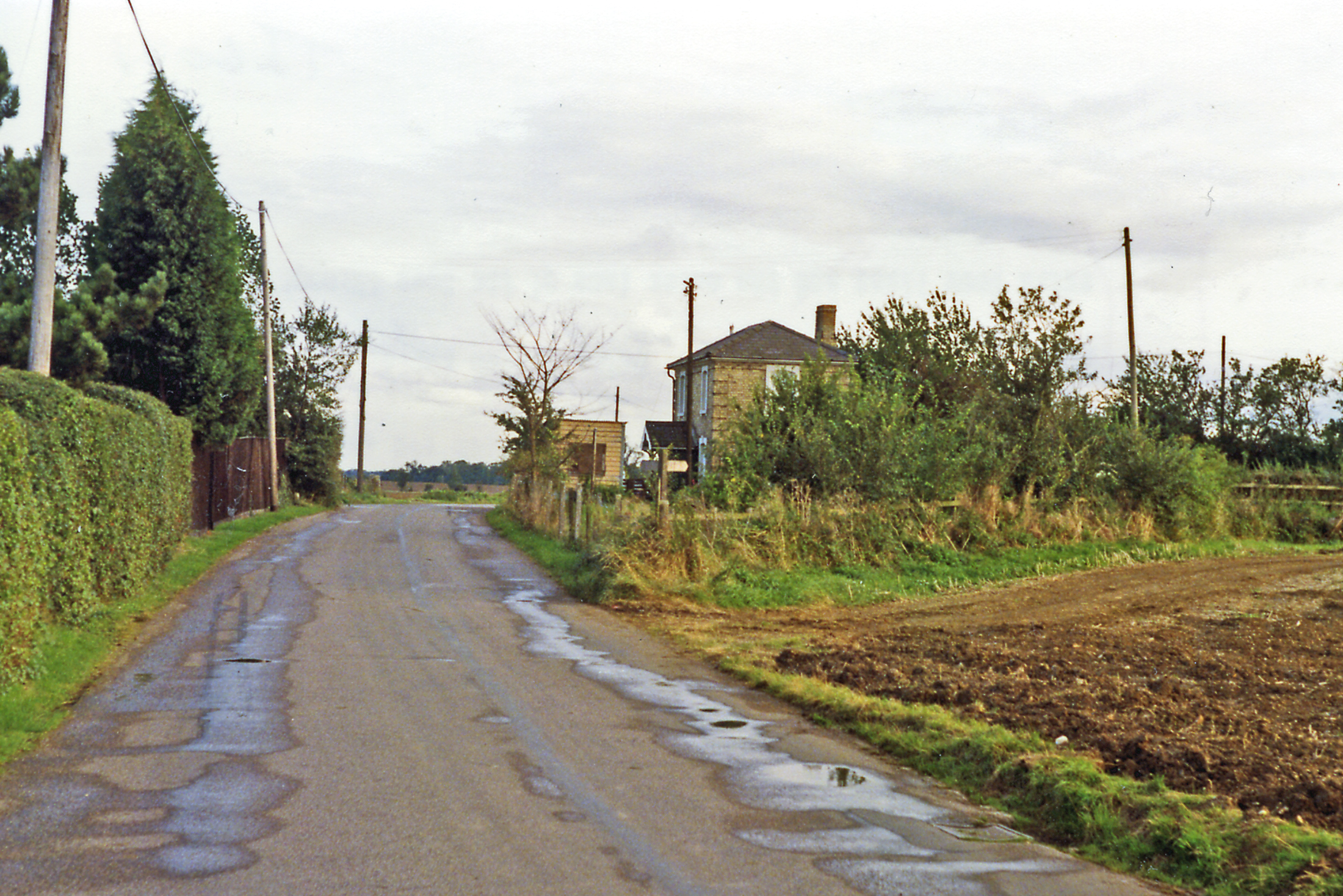
- Site of the station in 1992

General information
- Location: England
- Platforms: 1

Other information
- Status: Disused

History
- Original company: Bishops Stortford, Dunmow and Braintree Railway
- Pre-grouping: Great Eastern Railway
- Post-grouping: London and North Eastern Railway

Key dates
- 1895: Opened
- 3 March 1952: Closed
Location

Easton Lodge railway station was located to the west of Great Dunmow, Essex, near Easton Lodge. The station on the Bishop's Stortford to Braintree branch line (Engineer's Line Reference BSB). The station closed in 1952, with the line being used for freight until it was closed in 1972.

It was described in the Railway Magazine:

The Earl of Warwick has also the pleasure of possessing a railway station of his own. It is attached to his Essex residence of Easton Lodge, and bears the same name as the house. Of course, it is on the line owned by the Great Eastern Railway, and a short distance from Dunmow. It is perhaps as much used as any really "private" station, for the Warwick family spend much time every year at Easton, and keep constant company there.

The station was built in 1895, significantly later than the rest of the line, and was funded by the Earl and Countess of Warwick at a cost of £140 plus £52 annually for 10 years for upkeep; they also allowed it to be used by the general public. It has now been demolished but the crossing keeper's cottage remains. The adjacent land is now a banana ripening depot.

Preceding station	Disused railways	Following station
Takeley; Line and station closed	Great Eastern Railway; Bishop's Stortford-Braintree Branch Line	Dunmow; Line and station closed
