= Bannister Green Halt railway station =

Disused railway station in Bannister Green, Uttlesford

Coordinates: 51.8682°N 0.4547°E

Bannister Green Halt

General information
- Location: Bannister Green, Uttlesford; England
- Platforms: 1

Other information
- Status: Disused

History
- Original company: Great Eastern Railway
- Pre-grouping: Great Eastern Railway
- Post-grouping: London and North Eastern Railway

Key dates
- 18 Dec 1922: Opened
- 3 Mar 1952: Closed
Location

Bannister Green Halt railway station was a station in Bannister Green, Essex, England. The station was 13 miles 37 chains (21.67 km) from Bishop's Stortford on the Bishop's Stortford to Braintree branch line (Engineer's Line Reference BSB). The station closed in 1952.

Former services

Preceding station	Disused railways	Following station
Felsted	Great Eastern Railway; Bishop's Stortford-Braintree Branch Line	Rayne
