= Stane Street Halt railway station =

Former railway station in England

Stane Street Halt

General information
- Location: Takeley, Uttlesford; England
- Coordinates: 51.8673°N 0.2472°E
- Grid reference: TL547211
- Platforms: 1

Other information
- Status: Disused

History
- Original company: Great Eastern Railway
- Pre-grouping: Great Eastern Railway
- Post-grouping: London and North Eastern Railway

Key dates
- 18 December 1922: Opened
- 3 March 1952: Closed
Location

Stane Street Halt railway station was a station serving the community of Takeley Street to the west of the village of Takeley near Bishop's Stortford, England. The station was 4 miles 18 chains (6.80 km) from Bishop's Stortford on the Bishop's Stortford to Braintree branch line (Engineer's Line Reference BSB).

The halt opened on 18 December 1922 and closed on 3 March 1952. It was named after the nearby Roman road.

The halt along with almost all the intermediate stations on the Bishop's Stortford–Braintree branch were little used. The halt was built in a rural area. The village centre of Takeley is still rural and Stane Street and Takeley stations were very close together. However to try to boost passenger numbers, the owner of the line introduced a bus service. However the hoped for passenger numbers never materialized. The Halt makes its sole appearance in printed literature in 1935 in S P B Mais's England's Pleasance p. 261.

It closed to passengers along with the rest of the branch.

In 2011, the train station was rebuilt by Friends of the Flitch Way.

Preceding station	Disused railways	Following station
Hockerill Halt; Line and station closed	Great Eastern Railway; Bishop's Stortford-Braintree Branch Line	Takeley; Line and station closed
