= Felsted railway station =

Former railway station in England

Coordinates: 51.8648°N 0.4162°E

Felsted
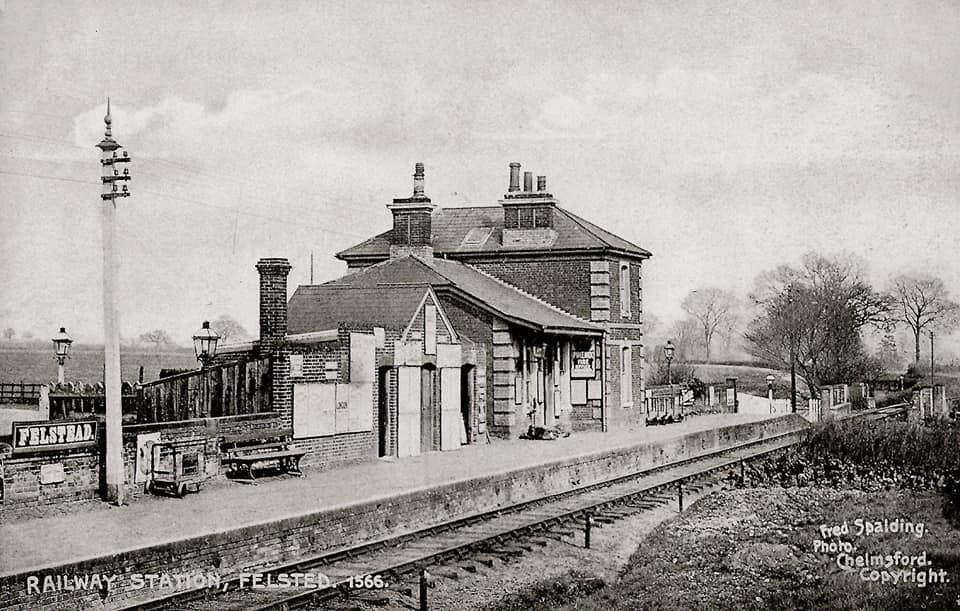
- Felstead Station in 1920

General information
- Location: Uttlesford; England
- Platforms: 1

Other information
- Status: Disused

History
- Original company: Bishops Stortford, Dunmow and Braintree Railway
- Pre-grouping: Great Eastern Railway
- Post-grouping: London and North Eastern Railway

Key dates
- 22 Feb 1869: Opened as Felstead
- 5 Jun 1950: Renamed Felsted
- 3 Mar 1952: Closed for regular passenger traffic
- 4 May 1964: Closed
Location

Felsted railway station was located in Essex between Felsted and Little Dunmow. The station was 11 miles 61 chains (18.93 km) from Bishop's Stortford on the Bishop's Stortford to Braintree branch line (Engineer's Line Reference BSB). The station closed to regular passenger traffic in 1952. Occasional special passenger trains used the station until it was completely closed in 1964. The station building still exists as a private house.

Former services

Preceding station	Disused railways	Following station
Dunmow	Great Eastern Railway; Bishop's Stortford-Braintree Branch Line	Bannister Green Halt
