= Dunmow =

Dunmow may refer to:

- Great Dunmow, a town in the Uttlesford district of Essex, England
  - Dunmow railway station, a disused station
- John Dunmow, a Canon of Windsor
- Little Dunmow, a village located about 3 miles outside the town of Great Dunmow
- Dunmow Rural District, a former district of Essex, England
