= Felsted (disambiguation) =

Felsted is a village in north-west Essex, England.

Felsted may also refer to:

- Felsted, Denmark
- Felsted Records
- Felsted School, England
- Felsted railway station, England

== See also ==
- Felstead (disambiguation)
