= Rayne railway station =

Former railway station in England

Coordinates: 51.8732°N 0.5063°E

Rayne
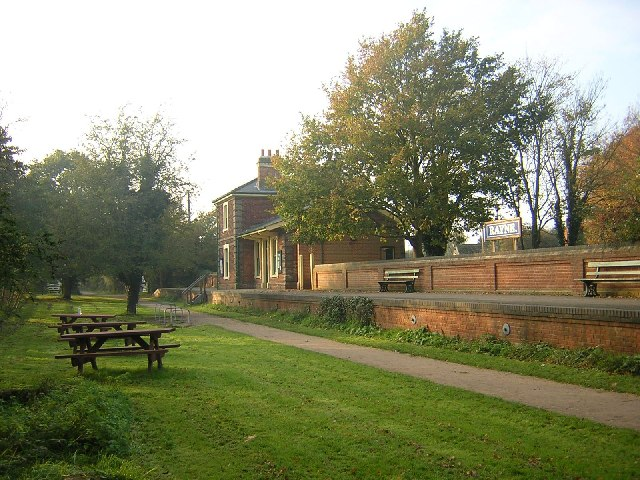
- Rayne railway station in 2005

General information
- Location: Braintree; England
- Platforms: 1

Other information
- Status: Disused

History
- Original company: Bishops Stortford, Dunmow and Braintree Railway
- Pre-grouping: Great Eastern Railway
- Post-grouping: London and North Eastern Railway

Key dates
- 22 Feb 1869: Opened
- 3 Mar 1952: Closed for regular passenger traffic
- 7 December 1964: Closed for freight
Location

Rayne railway station was located in Rayne, Essex. The station was 15 miles 54 chains (25.23 km) from Bishop's Stortford on the Bishop's Stortford to Braintree branch line (Engineer's Line Reference BSB). The station closed in 1952.

== History ==
The station is now the headquarters for the Essex Ranger Service and the visitor centre for the Flitch Way. The building was listed at Grade II by Historic England in July 2015.

== Route ==
Preceding station	Disused railways	Following station
Bannister Green Halt	Great Eastern Railway; Bishop's Stortford-Braintree Branch Line	Braintree
