= Takeley railway station =

Former railway station in England

Takeley
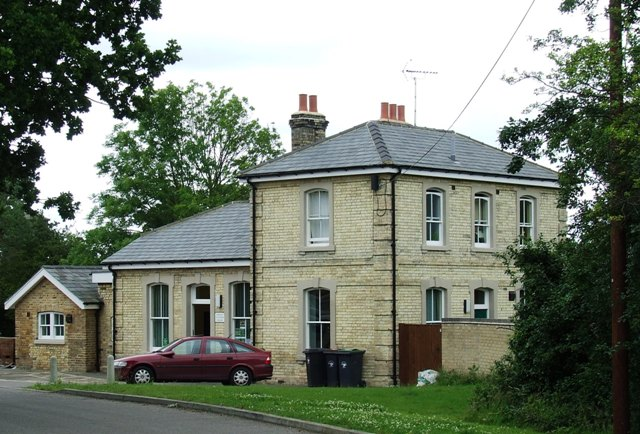

General information
- Location: Takeley, Uttlesford; England
- Coordinates: 51.8663°N 0.2671°E
- Platforms: 1

Other information
- Status: Disused

History
- Original company: Bishop's Stortford, Dunmow and Braintree Railway
- Pre-grouping: Great Eastern Railway
- Post-grouping: London and North Eastern Railway

Key dates
- 22 February 1869: Station opened
- 3 March 1952: Regular services ceased
- 1964: Excursions services ceased
- 1966: station completely closed
Location

Takeley railway station was a station serving the Hockerill area of Takeley in Bishop's Stortford, England. The station was 5 miles 11 chains (8.27 km) from Bishop's Stortford on the Bishop's Stortford to Braintree branch line (Engineer's Line Reference BSB).

== History ==
The railway line through Takeley was built by the Bishop's Stortford, Dunmow and Braintree Railway (BSD&BR). The line, including Takeley station, was opened on 22 February 1869, and on the same day the BSD&BR company was absorbed by the Great Eastern Railway.

Takeley was situated on the north side of the line and had only one platform. There was a substantial brick building that housed the stationmaster's house, booking office, waiting room, and lamp room. Also on the north side, there was a small goods yard, comprising a 240-foot siding used mainly by coal merchants. A second siding also served D.A. Fyfe and Sons warehouse. A signal box was located on the up side of the line.

Due to a decline in passenger traffic, Takeley closed to passengers on 3 March 1952, along with other stations on the line. However, it was not formally closed until 18 April 1966. The line through this station continued to operate for freight traffic until 1971.

Preceding station	Disused railways	Following station
Stane Street	Great Eastern Railway; Bishop's Stortford-Braintree Branch Line	Easton Lodge
