= Felstead (disambiguation) =

Felstead is a village in north-west Essex.

Felstead may also refer to:

- Felstead (horse)
- Alexandra 'Binky' Felstead, a character in the reality television series Made in Chelsea
- Jane 'Mummy' Felstead, Binky's mother, also a character in Made in Chelsea

== See also ==
- Felsted (disambiguation)
