= Listed buildings in Rayne, Essex =

Historic structures in Essex, England

Rayne is a village and civil parish in the Braintree District of Essex, England. It contains 67 listed buildings that are recorded in the National Heritage List for England. Of these one is grade I, one is grade II* and 65 are grade II.

This list is based on the information retrieved online from Historic England.

== Key ==
Grade	Criteria
I	Buildings that are of exceptional interest
II*	Particularly important buildings of more than special interest
II	Buildings that are of special interest

== Listing ==
Name	Grade	Location	Type	Completed (Note: The date given is the date used by Historic England as significant for the initial building or that of an important part in the structure's description.)	Date designated	Grid ref. (Note: The grid reference is based on the British national grid reference system, sometimes known as OSGB36, used by the Ordnance Survey.) Geo-coordinates	Notes	Entry number (Note: The "List Entry Number" is a unique number assigned to each listed building and scheduled monument by Historic England.)	Image	Wikidata
Rayne Railway Station	II	CM77 6RX	railway station		20 July 2015	TL7263122375; 51°52′24″N 0°30′23″E		1425096	Rayne Railway Station More images	Q7299316
Fairy Hall	II	Fairy Hall Lane			2 January 1985	TL7289422167; 51°52′17″N 0°30′36″E		1122795	Upload Photo	Q26415910
Pump Approximately 3 Metres from Kitchen Door of Fairy Hall	II	Fairy Hall Lane			2 January 1985	TL7288822162; 51°52′16″N 0°30′36″E		1147531	Upload Photo	Q26440552
Gore Cottage	II	4, Gore Lane			2 January 1985	TL7303922612; 51°52′31″N 0°30′44″E		1122796	Upload Photo	Q26415911
5 and 6, Gore Lane	II	5 and 6, Gore Lane			2 January 1985	TL7304922591; 51°52′30″N 0°30′45″E		1147566	Upload Photo	Q26440583
Fir Cottage	II	Gore Lane			16 February 1999	TL7305422507; 51°52′27″N 0°30′45″E		1346222	Upload Photo	Q26629792
Lavender Cottage Quincies	II	Gore Lane			2 January 1985	TL7301622621; 51°52′31″N 0°30′43″E		1338126	Upload Photo	Q26622473
Oak Cottage	II	Gore Lane			2 January 1985	TL7305122570; 51°52′29″N 0°30′45″E		1338127	Upload Photo	Q26622474
Pump on Verge in Front of Quincies and Lavender Cottage	II	Gore Lane			2 January 1985	TL7301622637; 51°52′32″N 0°30′43″E		1147555	Upload Photo	Q26440572
Tudor Cottage	II	Gore Lane			21 December 1967	TL7305922555; 51°52′29″N 0°30′45″E		1308482	Upload Photo	Q26684287
Little Common Cottage	II	Long Lane			2 January 1985	TL7272721667; 51°52′01″N 0°30′26″E		1122797	Upload Photo	Q26415912
Spinners	II	Long Lane			2 January 1985	TL7280921615; 51°51′59″N 0°30′30″E		1122798	Upload Photo	Q26415913
Barn Approximately 20 Metres North West of Gatewoods Farmhouse	II	Mill Lane			2 January 1985	TL7213622211; 51°52′19″N 0°29′56″E		1122758	Upload Photo	Q26415873
Barn Approximately 30 Metres North West of Fentons Farmhouse	II	Mill Lane			2 January 1985	TL7153622052; 51°52′14″N 0°29′25″E		1122756	Upload Photo	Q26415871
Fentons Farmhouse	II	Mill Lane			2 January 1985	TL7154822036; 51°52′14″N 0°29′25″E		1338148	Upload Photo	Q26622495
Gatewoods Farmhouse	II	Mill Lane			2 January 1985	TL7216422197; 51°52′18″N 0°29′58″E		1122757	Upload Photo	Q26415872
Pump in Front of Gatewoods Farmhouse	II	Mill Lane			2 January 1985	TL7215822201; 51°52′19″N 0°29′58″E		1338150	Upload Photo	Q26622497
Small Barn Adjacent to West of Barn Approximately 30 Metres North West of Fentons Farmhouse	II	Mill Lane			2 January 1985	TL7151922040; 51°52′14″N 0°29′24″E		1338149	Upload Photo	Q26622496
Stocks Farmhouse	II	New Road			4 December 1983	TL7313422386; 51°52′23″N 0°30′49″E		1122759	Upload Photo	Q26415874
Rayne War Memorial	II	Raynehall Green, Shalford Road	war memorial		7 June 2012	TL7313022804; 51°52′37″N 0°30′49″E		1407875	Rayne War Memorial More images	Q26675964
3, Shalford Road	II	3, Shalford Road			2 January 1985	TL7311022721; 51°52′34″N 0°30′48″E		1122772	Upload Photo	Q26415887
Old School House	II	5, Shalford Road, Rayne Hall Green			2 January 1985	TL7311222771; 51°52′36″N 0°30′48″E		1147798	Upload Photo	Q26440789
Mary's Cottage	II	13, Shalford Road, Rayne Hall Green			9 January 1975	TL7310522847; 51°52′38″N 0°30′48″E		1147786	Upload Photo	Q26440779
Sweet Briar	II	15, Shalford Road, Rayne Hall Green			2 January 1985	TL7308722862; 51°52′39″N 0°30′47″E		1338153	Upload Photo	Q26622500
Thatched Cottage	II	60, Shalford Road			2 January 1985	TL7280423025; 51°52′44″N 0°30′33″E		1147679	Upload Photo	Q26440685
78 and 80, Shalford Road	II	78 and 80, Shalford Road			2 January 1985	TL7272523096; 51°52′47″N 0°30′29″E		1122766	Upload Photo	Q26415881
Barn Approximately 12 Metres South West of Gould's Farmhouse	II	Shalford Road			2 January 1985	TL7242223151; 51°52′49″N 0°30′13″E		1147670	Upload Photo	Q26440677
Barn Approximately 35 Metres South West of Rayne Hall	II	Shalford Road, Rayne Hall Green			21 December 1967	TL7314422923; 51°52′41″N 0°30′50″E		1147724	Upload Photo	Q26440724
Barn Approximately 40 Metres South West of Rayne Hall and Adjoining Entrance Track to Hall	II	Shalford Road, Rayne Hall Green			2 January 1985	TL7314522895; 51°52′40″N 0°30′50″E		1122769	Upload Photo	Q26415884
Barn and Cartlodge Approximately 30 Metres North West of Pound Farm House and Adjacent to Road	II	Shalford Road			2 January 1985	TL7191523374; 51°52′57″N 0°29′47″E		1122761	Upload Photo	Q26415876
Cartlodge and Stable Ranges Adjacent to South West of Barn 40 Metres South West of Rayne Hall	II	Shalford Road, Rayne Hall Green			2 January 1985	TL7312722874; 51°52′39″N 0°30′49″E		1338152	Upload Photo	Q26622499
Church of All Saints	I	Shalford Road, Rayne Hall Green	church building		21 December 1967	TL7330922913; 51°52′40″N 0°30′59″E		1308377	Church of All Saints More images	Q17536116
Cottage on Opposite Side of Road and Approximately 70 Metres North West of Pound Farmhouse Pound Farm	II	Shalford Road			2 January 1985	TL7187923389; 51°52′57″N 0°29′45″E		1122762	Upload Photo	Q26415877
Easter Cottage Endley Cottage	II	Shalford Road, Duck End Green			2 January 1985	TL7227223125; 51°52′48″N 0°30′05″E		1122763	Upload Photo	Q26415878
Gould's Farmhouse	II	Shalford Road			2 January 1985	TL7244823168; 51°52′49″N 0°30′14″E		1122764	Upload Photo	Q26415879
Granary Approximately 4 Metres North of Gould's Farm House	II	Shalford Road			2 January 1985	TL7244823182; 51°52′50″N 0°30′14″E		1122765	Upload Photo	Q26415880
Highways	II	Shalford Road, Rayne Hall Green			2 January 1985	TL7308122902; 51°52′40″N 0°30′47″E		1122767	Upload Photo	Q26415882
Lock Up to Left of Mary's Cottage	II	Shalford Road, Rayne Hall Green			9 January 1975	TL7309622841; 51°52′38″N 0°30′48″E		1122771	Upload Photo	Q26415886
Outbuilding Adjacent to Rear Left of Pound Farm House	II	Shalford Road			2 January 1985	TL7196023352; 51°52′56″N 0°29′49″E		1122760	Upload Photo	Q26415875
Pound Farmhouse	II	Shalford Road			21 December 1967	TL7194623335; 51°52′55″N 0°29′48″E		1338151	Upload Photo	Q26622498
Pudneys Farmhouse	II	Shalford Road			2 January 1985	TL7109126234; 51°54′30″N 0°29′09″E		1147606	Upload Photo	Q26440620
Rayne Hall	II*	Shalford Road, Rayne Hall Green			2 May 1953	TL7321722962; 51°52′42″N 0°30′54″E		1147693	Upload Photo	Q17557496
Tudor Cottage	II	Shalford Road, Rayne Hall Green			2 January 1985	TL7317522827; 51°52′38″N 0°30′52″E		1122770	Upload Photo	Q26415885
Village Pump in Fenced Enclosure on Green Opposite Number 13 Mary's Cottage	II	Shalford Road, Rayne Hall Green			2 January 1985	TL7311722855; 51°52′39″N 0°30′49″E		1308405	Upload Photo	Q26595013
Wall Enclosing Garden to East of Rayne Hall and Adjoining Church Yard	II	Shalford Road, Rayne Hall Green			21 December 1967	TL7325922954; 51°52′42″N 0°30′56″E		1122768	Upload Photo	Q26415883
Walnut Tree Cottage	II	Shalford Road, Duck End Green			2 January 1985	TL7231823124; 51°52′48″N 0°30′08″E		1308441	Upload Photo	Q26595044
Marchants	II	6 and 8, The Street			2 January 1985	TL7297022637; 51°52′32″N 0°30′41″E		1122737	Upload Photo	Q26415853
25 and 27, the Street	II	25 and 27, The Street			2 January 1985	TL7276722626; 51°52′32″N 0°30′30″E		1338156	Upload Photo	Q26622503
Barn Adjoining the Street and Approximately 20 Metres West of Haverings Farmhouse	II	The Street			2 January 1985	TL7245922561; 51°52′30″N 0°30′14″E		1122776	Upload Photo	Q26415891
Barn Adjoining the Street and Approximately 4 Metres West of Barn 20 Metres West of Haverings Farm	II	The Street			2 January 1985	TL7243922559; 51°52′30″N 0°30′13″E		1338138	Upload Photo	Q26622485
Cartlodge Adjoining Road and Approximately 3 Metres West of Small Barn at Haverings Farm	II	The Street			2 January 1985	TL7241522550; 51°52′30″N 0°30′12″E		1122734	Upload Photo	Q26415850
Cast Iron Railings to Front Garden of Haverings Farmhouse and Attached by A Gate to Right of Barn	II	The Street			2 January 1985	TL7250522563; 51°52′30″N 0°30′16″E		1147867	Upload Photo	Q26440852
Farm Outbuilding to West of Havering Farmhouse	II	The Street			2 January 1985	TL7245822578; 51°52′30″N 0°30′14″E		1338139	Upload Photo	Q26622486
Granary Approximately 20 Metres North West of Haverings Farmhouse	II	The Street			2 January 1985	TL7244122587; 51°52′31″N 0°30′13″E		1122735	Upload Photo	Q26415851
Haverings Farmhouse	II	The Street			2 January 1985	TL7247422574; 51°52′30″N 0°30′15″E		1122775	Upload Photo	Q26415890
Medley Cottage	II	The Street			2 January 1985	TL7284822638; 51°52′32″N 0°30′34″E		1122774	Upload Photo	Q26415889
Medley House Pennels and Attached Forecourt Railings	II	The Street			2 January 1985	TL7286122642; 51°52′32″N 0°30′35″E		1147838	Upload Photo	Q26440826
Nether House	II	The Street			21 December 1967	TL7300522672; 51°52′33″N 0°30′43″E		1338155	Upload Photo	Q26622502
Outbuilding to Rear of the Swan and Adjoining Shalford Road	II	The Street			2 January 1985	TL7312822724; 51°52′34″N 0°30′49″E		1147816	Upload Photo	Q26440805
Pump in Forecourt of Marchants	II	The Street			2 January 1985	TL7297222645; 51°52′32″N 0°30′41″E		1338141	Upload Photo	Q26622488
Pump in Front of Farm Outbuildings	II	The Street			2 January 1985	TL7245422583; 51°52′31″N 0°30′14″E		1122736	Upload Photo	Q26415852
Rayne House	II	The Street			29 October 1971	TL7307322696; 51°52′34″N 0°30′46″E		1122773	Upload Photo	Q26415888
Small Barn Adjoining Road and Approximately 10 Metres West of Barn at Haverings Farm	II	The Street			2 January 1985	TL7242722552; 51°52′30″N 0°30′12″E		1273905	Upload Photo	Q26563609
Stables Approximately 20 Metres West of Granary at Haverings Farm	II	The Street			2 January 1985	TL7241922582; 51°52′31″N 0°30′12″E		1338140	Upload Photo	Q26622487
The Cauldron	II	The Street			2 January 1985	TL7284122637; 51°52′32″N 0°30′34″E		1147849	Upload Photo	Q26440836
The Swan	II	The Street	pub		2 January 1985	TL7313022707; 51°52′34″N 0°30′49″E		1338154	The Swan More images	Q26622501
Turners	II	The Street			21 December 1967	TL7305022687; 51°52′33″N 0°30′45″E		1147831	Upload Photo	Q26440820

== See also ==
- Grade I listed buildings in Essex
- Grade II* listed buildings in Essex

== Sources ==
- Bettley, James; Pevsner, Nikolaus (2007) [1954], Essex, The Buildings of England, New Haven and London: Yale University Press, ISBN 978-0-300-11614-4
