= Bannister Green =

Village in Essex, England

Coordinates: 51.85°N 00.45°E

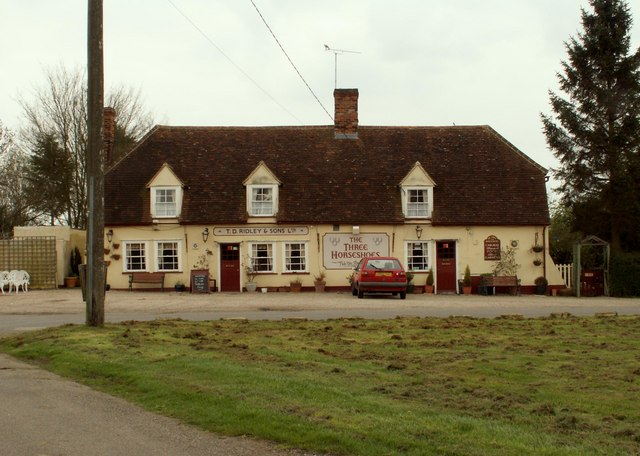
- 'The Three Horseshoes' pub

- Location within Essex
- Area: 0.378 km^{2} (0.146 sq mi)
- Population: 1,167 (2018 estimate)
  - Density: 3,087/km^{2} (8,000/sq mi)
- OS grid reference: TL6920
- Civil parish: Felsted
- District: Uttlesford
- Shire county: Essex
- Region: East
- Country: England
- Sovereign state: United Kingdom
- Post town: DUNMOW
- Postcode district: CM6
- Police: Essex
- Fire: Essex
- Ambulance: East of England

Bannister Green is a village near Felsted, in the Uttlesford district, in the county of Essex, England. It was the site of Bannister Green Halt railway station on the Bishop's Stortford-Braintree Branch Line, prior to that station's closure in 1952. The local old traditional pub 'The Three Horseshoes' is now closed down. In 2018 it had an estimated population of 1167.
