= Gransmore Green =

Hamlet in Essex, England

Coordinates: 51.8736°N 0.4604°E

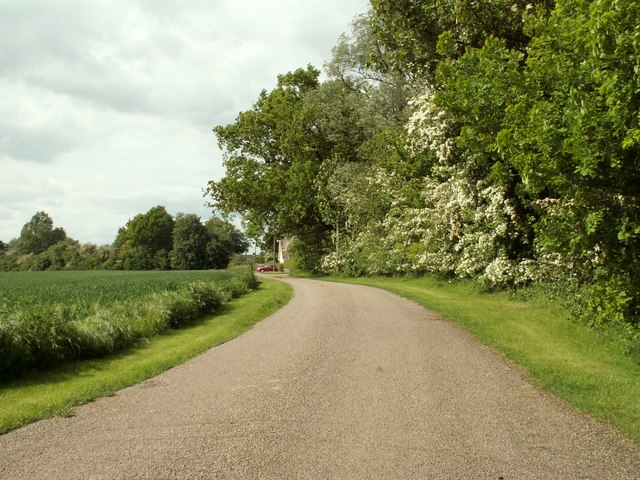
- Gransmore Green

- Location within Essex
- Civil parish: Felsted
- District: Uttlesford
- Shire county: Essex
- Region: East
- Country: England
- Sovereign state: United Kingdom

Gransmore Green is a hamlet in the civil parish of Felsted, in the Uttlesford district of Essex, England. Nearby settlements include the towns of Braintree and Great Dunmow, and Felsted village. The hamlet is situated on the B1417 road, with the A120 road nearby to the north.
