= Dunmow railway station =

Former railway station in England

Dunmow
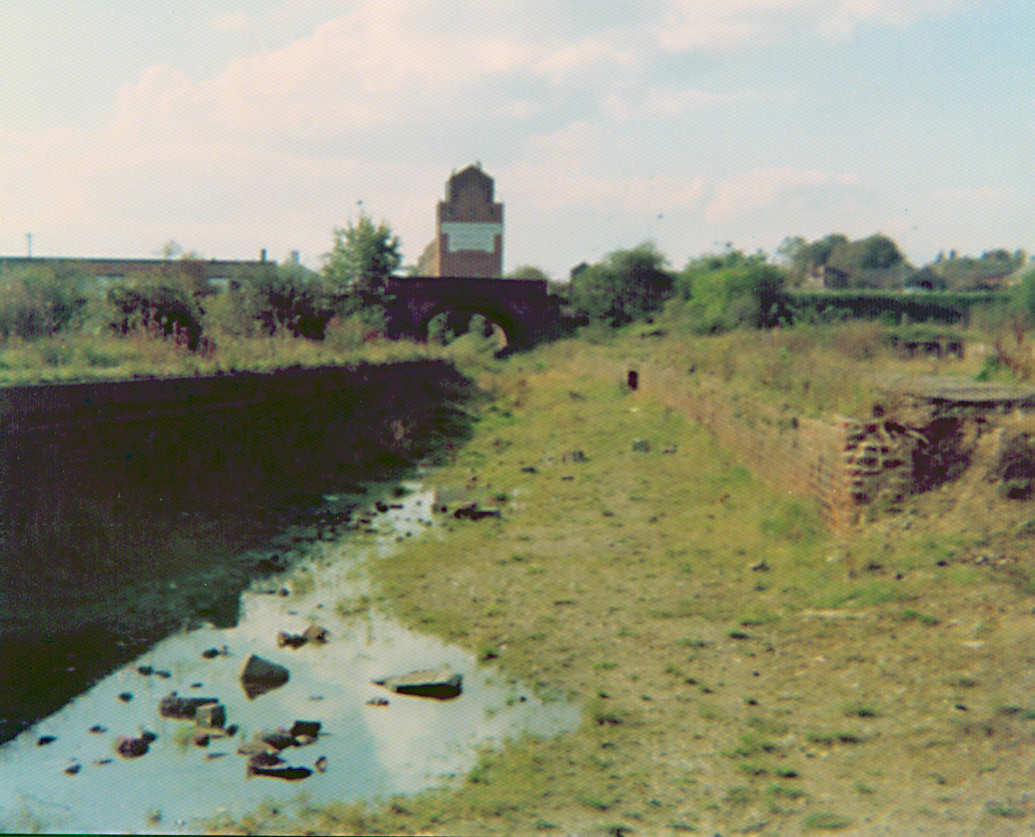
- Dunmow railway station in 1976.

General information
- Location: Great Dunmow, Uttlesford; England
- Coordinates: 51.8676°N 0.3693°E
- Platforms: 2

Other information
- Status: Disused

History
- Original company: Bishop's Stortford, Dunmow and Braintree Railway
- Pre-grouping: Great Eastern Railway
- Post-grouping: London and North Eastern Railway

Key dates
- 22 February 1869: Station opened
- 3 March 1952: regular passenger services ceased
- August Bank Holiday 1964: last used by special excursion trains
- 1 April 1969: closed (goods)
Location

Dunmow railway station was a station serving Great Dunmow, Essex. The station was 9 miles 38 chains (15.25 km) from Bishop's Stortford on the Bishop's Stortford to Braintree branch line (Engineer's Line Reference BSB).

== History ==
The railway line through Dunmow was built by the Bishop's Stortford, Dunmow and Braintree Railway (BSD&BR). The line, including Dunmow station, was opened on 22 February 1869, and on the same day the BSD&BR company was absorbed by the Great Eastern Railway.

Regular services ended on 3 March 1952, but the station was last used by excursion trains in August 1964. It closed to goods on 1 April 1969. The site and trackbed have been used for the B1256 Dunmow Bypass and no trace of the railway remains.

== Route ==
Preceding station	Disused railways	Following station
Easton Lodge	Great Eastern Railway; Bishop's Stortford-Braintree Branch Line	Felsted
