= Bartholomew Green, Essex =

Hamlet in Essex, England

Coordinates: 51.859°N 0.499°E

Bartholomew Green
- Location within Essex
- OS grid reference: TL7221
- District: Uttlesford
- Shire county: Essex
- Region: East
- Country: England
- Sovereign state: United Kingdom
- Police: Essex
- Fire: Essex
- Ambulance: East of England

Bartholomew Green is a hamlet in the Felsted civil parish and the Uttlesford district of Essex, England. The nearest town is Braintree.
