= Talliston House =

Coordinates: 51.8740°N 0.3541°E

Talliston House & Gardens is an ex-council house in Essex, England that has been transformed by owner John Trevillian into a miniature palace. The house is located at Talliston, Newton Green, Great Dunmow, Essex CM6 1DU, United Kingdom.

As a child, Trevillian always wanted to live in a castle and when he bought the house in 1990 he set about turning it into his fantasy, with thirteen detailed and themed rooms.

In 2014, it was reported that due to financial difficulties Trevillian was going to have to sell the house that he had spent over £500,000 on, for £350,000, but a public outcry resulted in substantial donations that allowed him to stay. The house was opened to the public on 6 October 2015, exactly 25 years after work began.

Talliston House & Gardens is featured in episode two of the Netflix show Amazing Interiors.
