= Amazing Interiors =

American reality show on Netflix

- Genre: Reality television
- Created by: Jude Parker
- Directed by: James Howard
- No. of seasons: 1
- No. of episodes: 12

Production
- Executive producers: Sam Barcroft; Peter Wyles
- Running time: 21–28 minutes

Original release
- Network: Netflix
- Release: July 20, 2018

Amazing Interiors is an American reality television series on Netflix that focuses on homes with unusual interiors. The show's first season of 12 episodes was released on Netflix on July 20, 2018.

The show's premise revolves around finding and showcasing homes that, despite their ordinary exterior appearance, have unique, custom interiors. The show often features homes that double as part-time museums, rooms where the owners do not actively live, such as basements, garages, a hockey fan cave, a bunker, and a backyard roller coaster.

== Format ==
Each episode follows a similar format, featuring three different houses. One home is under construction or renovation, and the episode follows the process throughout the remodel. The other two houses are shown as segments during the show.

The show has no host or narrator.

== Episodes ==
No.	Title	Original release date
1	"Chicago Cubs Cave, Aquarium House, The Love Boat"	July 20, 2018
2	"House of Horrors, History House, House of Cars"	July 20, 2018
3	"Circus House, Recycled House, Sci-Fi Museum"	July 20, 2018
4	"Luxury Penthouse, Cat House, Hockey Fan's Dream"	July 20, 2018
5	"Secret Boudoir, Ultimate Man Cave, Apocalypse Bunker"	July 20, 2018
6	"Doll House, House of Murals, Shapeshifter Flat"	July 20, 2018
7	"Hidden Cottage, Technicolor House, Backyard Coaster"	July 20, 2018
8	"House of Dictators, Bank House, Steampunk Wonderland"	July 20, 2018
9	"House of Ruins, Racer's Pad, House of Oddities"	July 20, 2018
10	"Pink Palace, Waterfall Bedroom, House of Doodles"	July 20, 2018
11	"Medieval Dining Hall, The Basement Train, House of Neon"	July 20, 2018
12	"Ultimate Greenhouse, Skatepark Living Room, Tiki Lounge"	July 20, 2018

== See also ==
- Talliston House - featured in episode two.
- Angels and Muse - a coworking space in Lagos for art residencies and exhibitions put up by Nigerian artist Victor Ehikhamenor, featured in episode ten.
