= William Hemming =

English clergyman and cricketer

William Spence (or Spencer) Hemming (17 August 1826 – 8 December 1897) was an English clergyman and a first-class cricketer who played for Cambridge University in 1848. He was born at Little Parndon, Essex and died at Rayne, also in Essex.

Hemming played three matches subsequently judged to be first-class for Cambridge University in May 1848, appearing as a tail-end batsman to little effect but enjoying great success as a bowler: he took 21 wickets in his three games, including two returns of six wickets in an innings. Full statistics are not available for these games and neither his batting nor his bowling style is known. There is no record of any other cricket appearances, either in first-class or minor cricket.

== Career outside cricket ==
Hemming was educated at Kensington in London and at Christ's College, Cambridge. He was ordained as a Church of England priest after his graduation and served as the curate of Rayne in Essex from 1851 to 1855, and then as the village's rector from 1855 until his death in 1897.
