= Rayne, Essex =

Village in Essex, England

Coordinates: 51.8768°N 0.5142°E

Rayne
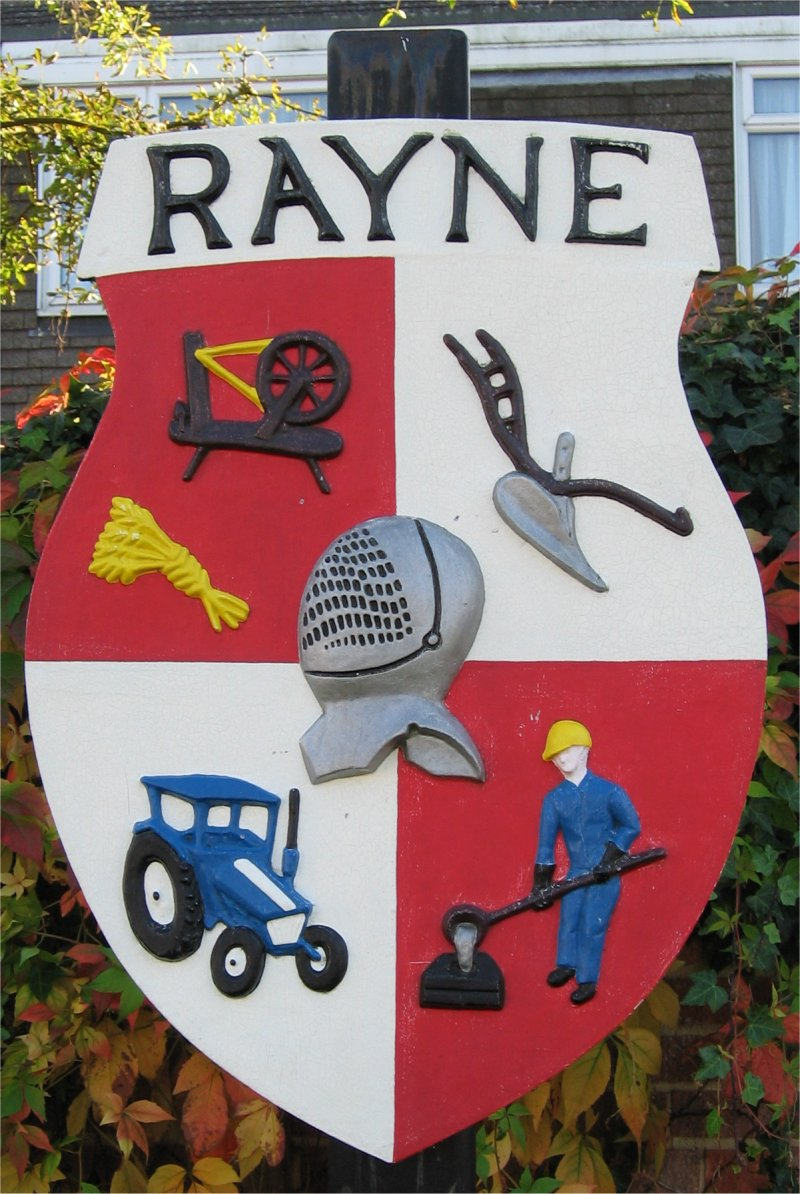
- Rayne Village Shield, featuring a helmet associated with Sir Giles Capel and symbols of local industries including spinning and straw plaiting, agriculture and the former foundry.

- Location within Essex
- Population: 2,360 (Parish, 2021); 2,154 (Built up area, 2021)
- OS grid reference: TL730228
- District: Braintree
- Shire county: Essex
- Region: East
- Country: England
- Sovereign state: United Kingdom
- Post town: Braintree
- Postcode district: CM77
- Dialling code: 01376
- Police: Essex
- Fire: Essex
- Ambulance: East of England
- UK Parliament: Braintree

Rayne is a village and civil parish in the Braintree district of Essex, England. It lies about 2 miles (3.2 km) west of Braintree on the A120 road. The settlement follows the line of the Roman road Stane Street between Colchester and Braughing. At the 2021 census the parish had a population of 2,360, and the built up area had a population of 2,154.

Rayne has twice won awards for its community life, including Essex Village of the Year in 2006 and the national Calor Village of the Year (Information and Communication category) in 2006–07.

== History ==
=== Early history ===
Archaeological finds indicate Roman activity around Rayne, including agricultural remains and a possible heated building. The village is recorded in the Domesday Book (1086) under five separate entries. Together these describe extensive ploughlands, meadows, woodland, two mills, 15 slaves, and show that Rayne paid the highest taxation in Hinckford Hundred.

=== Medieval and early modern period ===
The parish church of All Saints has origins in the 13th century, with the earliest known rector recorded in 1260. The west tower was built in 1510 by the Capel family, prominent landowners who also resided at Rayne Hall. Several manor houses stood within the parish, including Rayne Hall, Old Hall (Baynards), and Rayne Manor, the latter once belonging to the Knights Hospitaller.

=== 19th and 20th centuries ===
Rayne Parish Council was established in December 1894 following the Local Government Act 1894. The council acquired playing fields, planted commemorative trees, and developed local amenities.

The village was served by Rayne railway station, opened in 1869 on the Bishop’s Stortford–Braintree branch line. Passenger services ceased in 1952 and freight in 1964. The station survives as the visitor centre for the Flitch Way country park.

During the Second World War the Rayne Foundry contributed to wartime industry, and later produced replacement brass cogs for the clock of Big Ben. The foundry closed in 2001 and the site was redeveloped for housing.

=== Recent developments ===
In 2006 Rayne was named Essex Village of the Year, and in 2006–07 it won the national Calor Village of the Year (Information and Communication category). The Rayne Heritage Trail, supported by the Heritage Lottery Fund, highlights more than 60 listed buildings and sites of interest.

== Governance ==
Rayne is a civil parish with its own elected parish council. It falls within Braintree district for local government purposes and within Essex County Council for county-level services.

== Geography and demography ==
The parish lies on gently undulating land crossed by the line of the Roman Stane Street. The Flitch Way long-distance trail runs through the village.

At the 2011 census the population was 2,299. Compared with national averages, the parish has higher levels of home ownership and a large proportion of residents employed in professional and managerial occupations.

== Landmarks ==
- All Saints Church: medieval parish church with a 16th-century tower, largely rebuilt in 1840 with extensions in 1914.
- Rayne War Memorial: a Grade II listed stone cross erected in 1920 with later additions for Second World War casualties, located on Rayne Hall Green.
- Rayne railway station: a Victorian red-brick station building, Grade II listed, now serving as a café and visitor centre.
- Rayne Hall, Old Hall and Rayne Manor: historic houses associated with prominent local families.

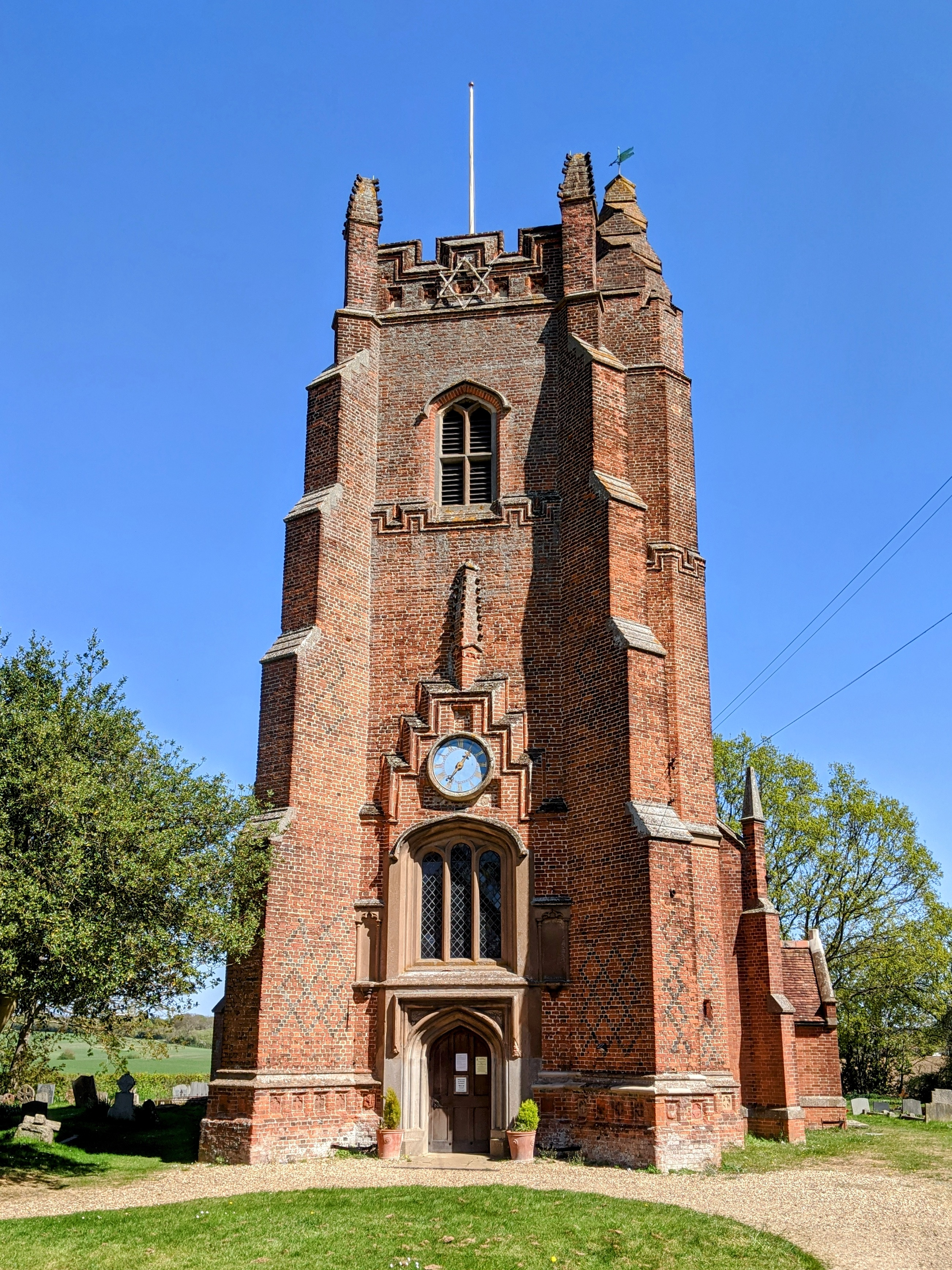
All Saints Church, Rayne, photographed in 2019.

== Notable people ==
- Sir Giles Capel (1485–1556), courtier and landowner.
- Margaret Arundell (d. 1522), wife of Sir William Capel, associated with Rayne Hall.
- William Hemming (1826–1897), rector of Rayne and Cambridge University cricketer.
- Leeroy Thornhill (born 1968), musician and former member of The Prodigy, born in Rayne.
- Beans on Toast (Jay McAllister, born 1980), folk singer-songwriter who lived in Rayne.

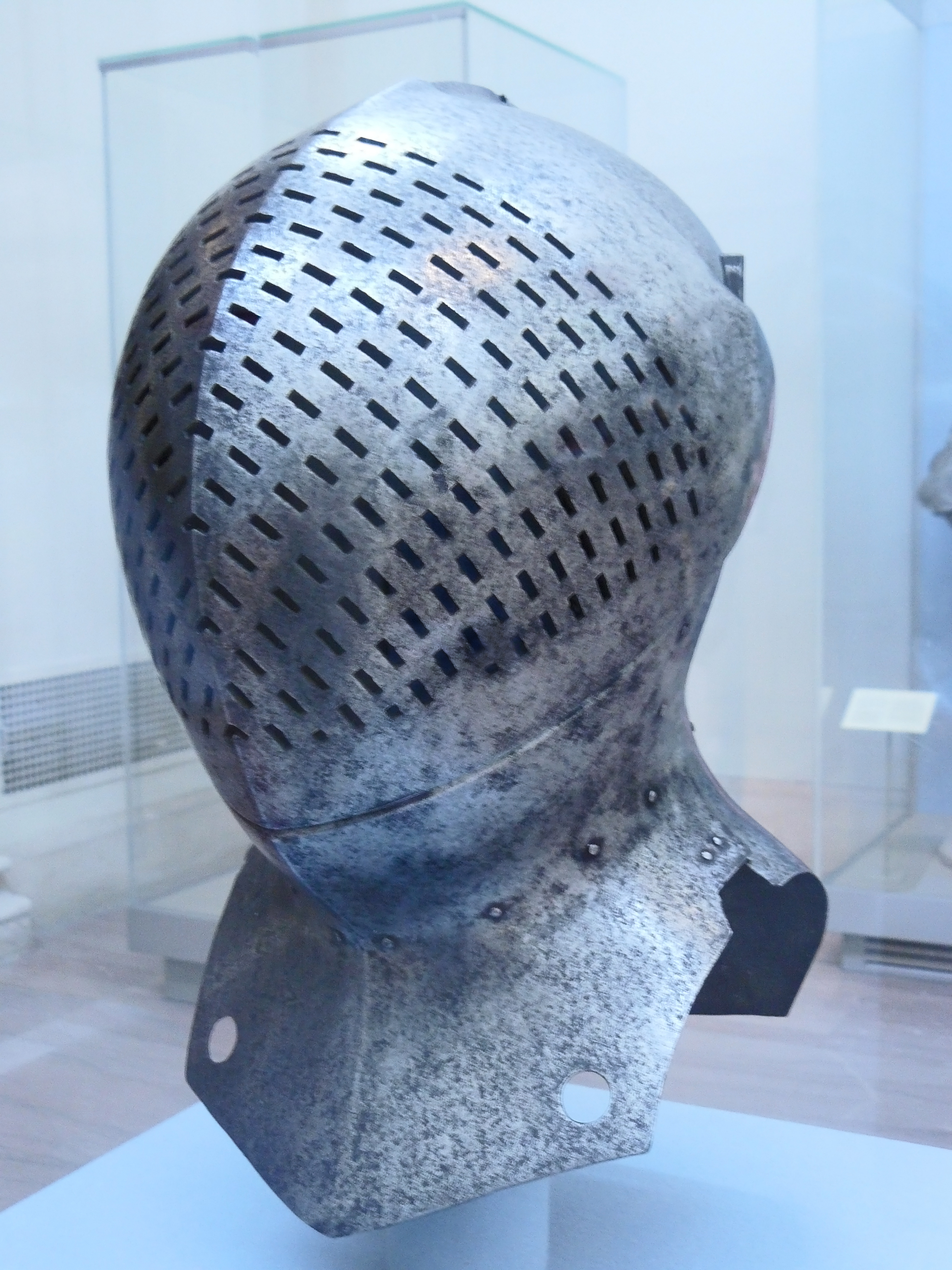
Tournament helm of Sir Giles Capel c.1510, which hung above his tomb in Rayne Church until 1840. Now displayed at the Metropolitan Museum of Art in New York.

== Culture and community ==
Rayne hosts community events and maintains a strong local identity. The Rayne Heritage Trail provides an app-based and guided exploration of the village’s history. Oral histories record village life during the Second World War, including billeting of soldiers and evacuation of children.

The village once supported several public houses; two remain, alongside shops and services catering to residents and walkers on the Flitch Way.
