= All Saints' Church, Rayne =

All Saints' Church
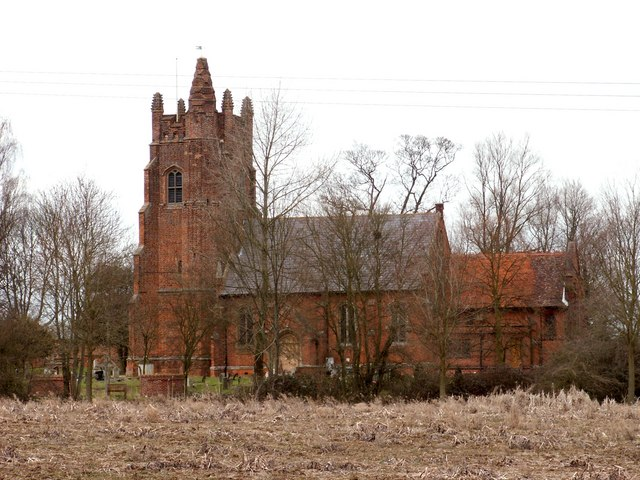
- The Tudor tower of All Saints, Rayne
- All Saints' Church
- Location: Rayne, Essex
- Country: England
- Denomination: Church of England
- Website: thethreechurches.co.uk

History
- Status: Parish church

Architecture
- Functional status: Active
- Heritage designation: Grade I listed
- Designated: 21 December 1967
- Architect: Lewis Vulliamy (1840 rebuild)
- Completed: Original medieval, rebuilt 1840–41

Administration
- Province: Canterbury
- Diocese: Chelmsford
- Archdeaconry: Colchester
- Deanery: Braintree
- Parish: Rayne

All Saints' Church is a Grade I listed Church of England parish church in Rayne, Essex. The church is notable for its early 16th-century red-brick tower, built for Sir William Capel, and for a major 19th-century reconstruction of the nave and chancel. It remains the centre of Anglican worship in the village and is part of a united benefice with Great Notley and Black Notley.

== History ==
The first church at Rayne is likely to date the Norman period and was connected with a local shrine once visited by pregnant women seeking blessings.

The present west tower was built around 1510 for Sir William Capel, twice Lord Mayor of London. Constructed in red brick with blue-brick diapering, it is considered among the finest examples of Tudor brickwork in Essex.

By the 1830s the medieval nave and chancel were declared unsafe and were demolished. They were rebuilt in 1840–1841 under the architect Lewis Vulliamy, with the foundation stone laid by the Earl of Essex.

Further alterations included the addition of a sanctuary and vestry (1914), installation of electric lighting (1935), and extensive maintenance in the 1970s.

In 2020–2021 a major reordering project funded by the Heritage Lottery Fund restored the interior, replaced fixed pews with flexible seating, installed new heating and audio-visual systems, and developed a heritage trail and guidebook.

== Architecture ==
The west tower is about 11 by 10 feet and of three stages with an embattled parapet, pinnacles, diagonal buttresses, and a stair turret. Decorative panels show shields with a lion, anchor, and quatrefoils, associated with the Capel family.

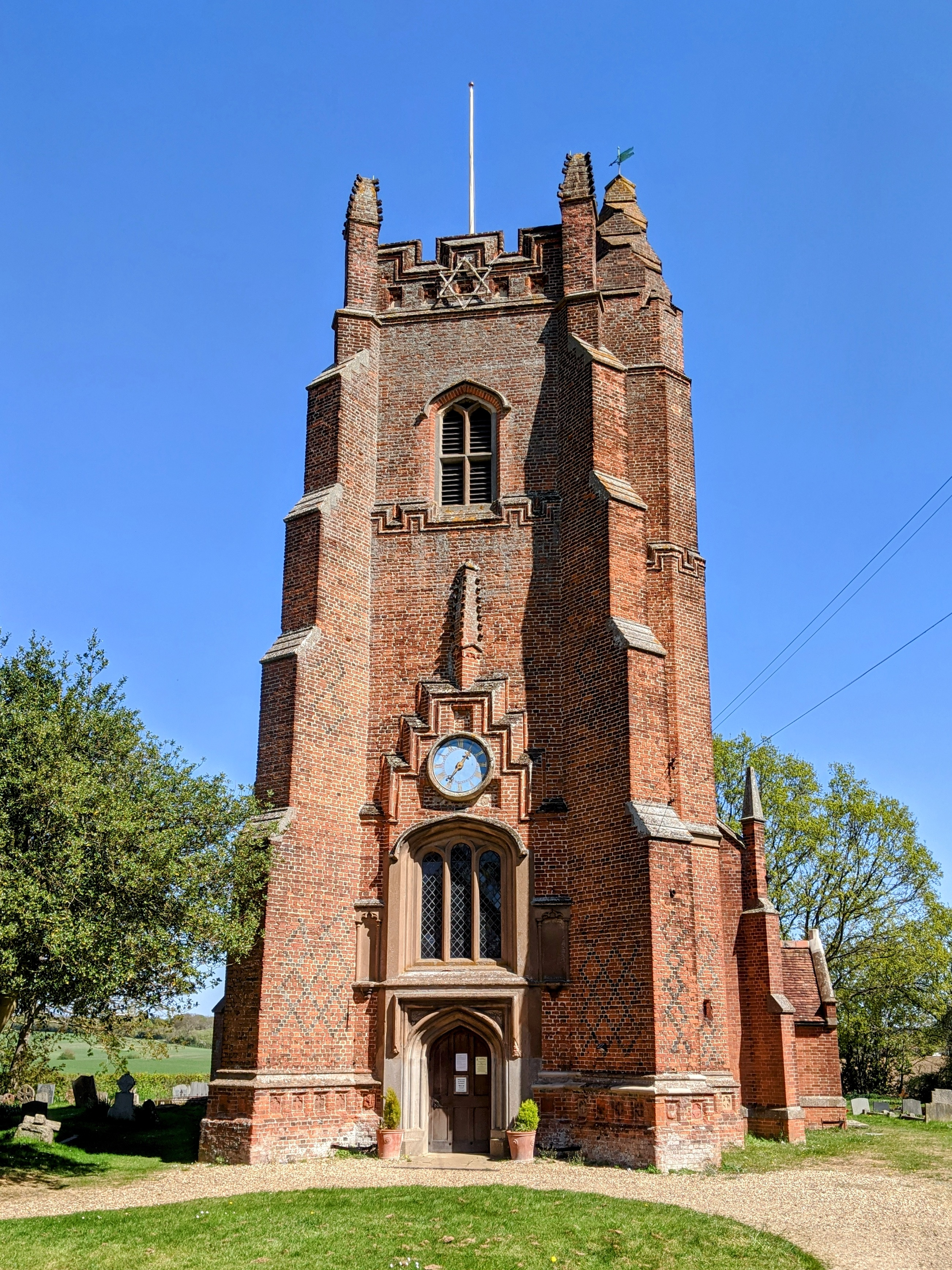
West tower, pictured in 2019.

The nave and chancel rebuilt in 1840–1841 are of flint rubble with stone dressings, in a simplified Gothic Revival style.

== Notable artefacts ==
The church once contained the funerary achievements of Sir Giles Capel (1485–1556). His tournament helm was hung above his tomb until the 1840 rebuilding, when it was removed. The helm survives and is now displayed in the Metropolitan Museum of Art, New York City, as an example of mid-Tudor armour.

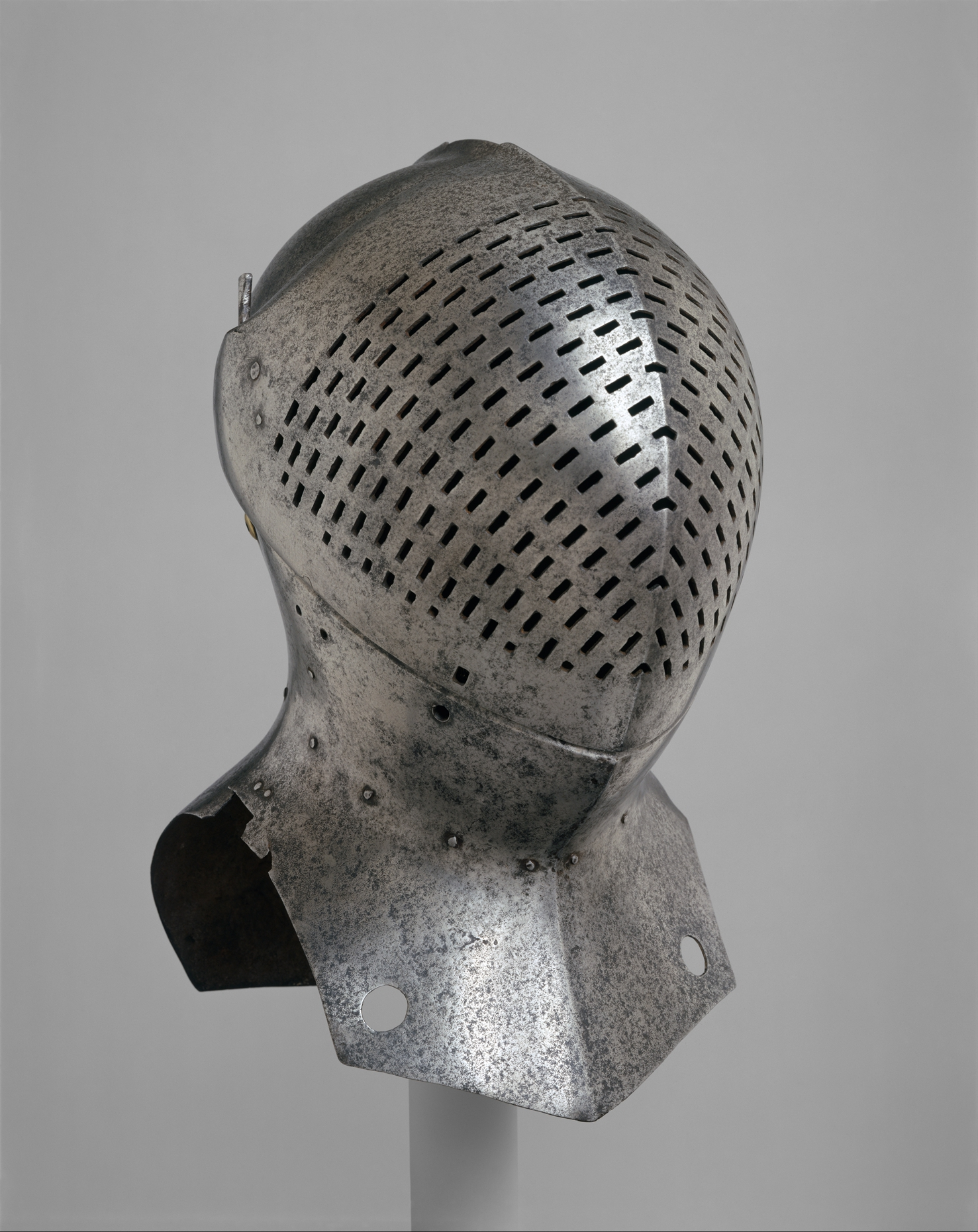
Tournament helm of Sir Giles Capel (c. 1510)

Other notable features include a 14th-century octagonal font, Flemish carved panels of the life of Christ incorporated into the choir stalls, carved ceiling bosses, fragments of medieval stained glass, and a sacring bell. The arms of the Capel family also appear within the church’s decoration.

== Bells ==
The tower contains a ring of six bells hung for change ringing. The oldest dates to the early 17th century and was recast by John Hodson in 1665. Subsequent bells were added or recast in the 18th and 19th centuries, with restoration and retuning in the 20th century. The bells are rung regularly for services and community occasions.

== Organ ==
All Saints' Church houses a two-manual pipe organ originally built in the mid–19th century, shortly after the rebuilding of the nave and chancel. It was likely built by the Hull firm Forster and Andrews and installed in 1867.

The instrument was rebuilt and enlarged by Henry Jones & Son in the early 20th century, with later maintenance and restoration carried out in the 1950s.

== Rectors ==
The parish has had a continuous line of rectors since the medieval period. Notable incumbents include:

- John Capel (died 1574), a member of the Capel family, who served during the Elizabethan religious settlement.
- Rev. John Hamilton Gray (1800–1867), antiquary and author, who served as rector in the 19th century.

The church now forms part of a team ministry with Great Notley and Black Notley.

== Heritage ==
All Saints is a Grade I listed building, recognised for the quality of its Tudor tower and historic associations with the Capel family. The churchyard contains numerous memorials, including a gravestone to Rebecca Fairs (1793), said to have lived to the age of 102.

== Community ==
The church hosts regular Sunday worship, midweek prayer, and community events including lunch clubs, concerts, and heritage tours. It also provides facilities such as level access, toilets, and free Wi-Fi to support visitors and heritage projects.
