= Felsted =

Village in Essex, England

Coordinates: 51.856°N 0.436°E

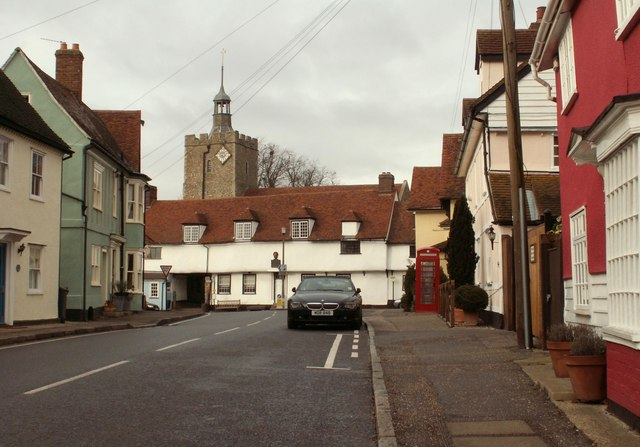
- Felsted village

- Location within Essex
- Population: 3,165 (Parish, 2021)
- OS grid reference: TL677203
- District: Uttlesford
- Shire county: Essex
- Region: East
- Country: England
- Sovereign state: United Kingdom
- Post town: DUNMOW
- Postcode district: CM6
- Dialling code: 01371
- Police: Essex
- Fire: Essex
- Ambulance: East of England
- UK Parliament: Saffron Walden

Felsted (sometimes spelt Felstead) is a village and civil parish in the Uttlesford district of Essex, England. As well as the village itself, the parish also includes the hamlets of Bannister Green, Bartholomew Green, Causeway End, Coblers Green, Cock Green, Frenches Green, Gransmore Green, Hartford End, Molehill Green, Milch Hill, Thistley Green, Watch House Green and Willows Green. At the 2021 census the parish had a population of 3,165.

== History ==
Felsted is recorded in the Domesday Book of 1086 as Felesteda, Felstede and Phensteda in the Hundred of Hinckford, where it was held by Earl Ælfgar as feu in the time of King Edward. In 1086, Felstead was part of the land of La Trinité of Caen, who held four hides. The fifth hide was no longer in this manor as King William gave three virgates to Roger God-save-the-ladies and the fourth to Geoffrey fitzSalomon.

The village has links to Richard Rich, 1st Baron Rich who founded the public school, the Felsted School, in 1564, and is buried in Holy Cross Church. Lord Rich was an important benefactor of the Felsted Church. The school also has links to Oliver Cromwell, who sent his sons there. The valley between Little Dunmow and Felsted was the location for the only sugar beet factory in Essex, which has been redeveloped for housing in a community called Flitch Green.

== Geography ==
Felsted is south of the A120 and is near Braintree, Great Dunmow and Chelmsford. It lies on the north bank of the River Chelmer as it leaves Great Dunmow and turns south towards Chelmsford.

- Latitude/Longitude in decimal degrees:51.85656 0.43327
- Latitude/Longitude in degrees, minutes, and seconds:51° 51' 24" North 0° 26' 60" East
- Height above sea level:76 m, 249.34 ft, 2992.13 in

== Community ==
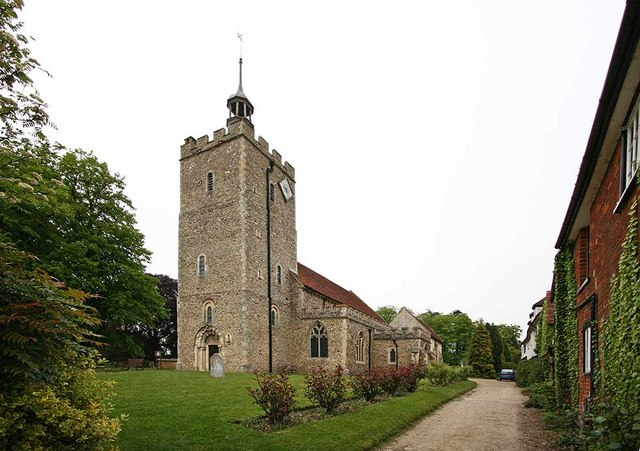
Holy Cross Church, Felsted

Felsted is linked to Little Dunmow by the Flitch Way Country Park, a former railway line. The village has a village store, a coffee shop and a tea room, an antiques shop, a ladies' clothes shop, an estate agent, two public houses (the Chequers and the Swan),The Royal British Legion which is situated by the church car park and the Felsted Sports injury clinic.

The village is also home of Felsted Rovers Football Club who play their home matches at the rear of the Memorial Hall.

The electoral ward of Felsted had a population of 5,525 at the 2011 census.

== See also ==
- The Hundred Parishes
