= Great Dunmow =

Town in Essex, England

Coordinates: 51.871°N 0.364°E

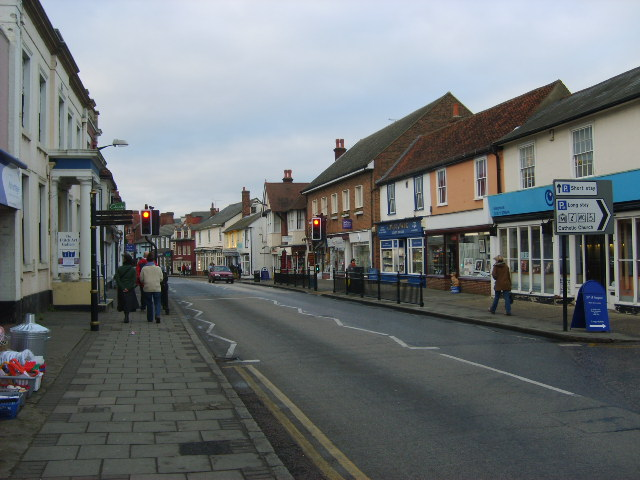
- High Street

- Location within Essex
- Population: 10,630 (Parish, 2021); 10,395 (built-up area, 2021)
- OS grid reference: TL628218
- Civil parish: Great Dunmow
- District: Uttlesford
- Shire county: Essex
- Region: East
- Country: England
- Sovereign state: United Kingdom
- Post town: DUNMOW
- Postcode district: CM6
- Dialling code: 01371
- Police: Essex
- Fire: Essex
- Ambulance: East of England
- UK Parliament: North West Essex
- Website: greatdunmow-tc.gov.uk

Great Dunmow or Dunmow is a historic market town and civil parish in the Uttlesford district of Essex, England. It lies to the north of the A120 road, approximately midway between Bishop's Stortford and Braintree, 5 miles (8 km) east of London Stansted Airport. At the 2021 census the parish had a population of 10,630 and the built-up area had a population of 10,395. The town is on the site of a Roman settlement on Stane Street, in the upper valley of the river Chelmer.

== Toponymy ==
The name Dunmow is Old English and means "hill meadow". The name is used for the two parishes of Great Dunmow and Little Dunmow. Great Dunmow was historically also known as Chipping Dunmow, with "chipping" indicating a place with a market, whilst Little Dunmow was sometimes known as Canon Dunmow referencing its priory.

Great Dunmow is the legal name of the parish and is also used by the Office for National Statistics for the name of the built-up area In official postal addresses, the Royal Mail calls the town just Dunmow.

== History ==
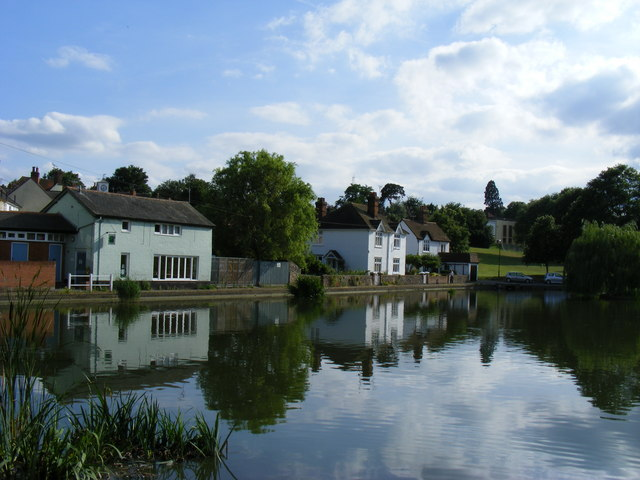
Doctor's Pond, off North Street to the north of the market place

A small Roman town developed at the junction between Stane Street and the Roman roads which ran north-east to south-west from Sudbury to London, and north-west to south-east from Cambridge to Chelmsford. The main settlement area spread westwards from the road junction, with cemeteries on the outskirts. There is also evidence of Roman settlement at Church End, 0.5 miles (0.8 km) north of the main settlement at the road junction; this site likely included a rural Roman Temple.

It is unclear whether the Roman settlements at Dunmow remained in continuous occupation following the end of Roman rule in Britain in the fifth century. The site at Church End had been reoccupied by 951 AD, during the Saxon era, when it first appears under the name Dunmow in the historical record. A church is known to have existed at Church End by 1045.

In Saxon times, Dunmow formed an extensive vill. In the Domesday Book in 1086 there are ten entries for estates in the vill of Dunmow, held by eight different owners. Dunmow also gave its name to the wider Dunmow hundred. Some of the estates were manors; the names of some of the medieval manors are still in use for modern farms or large houses in the parish, including Bigods, Merks Hall, Newton Hall, and Shingle Hall.

The old vill came to be administered as the two parishes of Great Dunmow and Little Dunmow. Church End appears to have been the main settlement in Great Dunmow parish in Saxon and Norman times. In 1227 Great Dunmow was granted a market charter after which the main focus for development came to be the area around the market place at the junction of the old Roman roads, between the modern High Street and White Street.

The parish church at Church End, dedicated to St Mary, was rebuilt in the 13th century. With Church End being some distance from the growing town around the market place, a chapel of ease dedicated to St George the Martyr was built in the market place in the medieval period, but was later demolished.

In medieval times, Dunmow was a thriving commercial centre. As well as its market, two fairs were held annually until the 19th century.

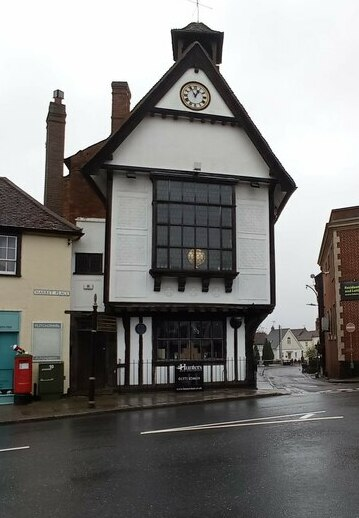
The Old Town Hall

In 1555, Great Dunmow was granted a municipal charter by Mary I, incorporating the town as a borough. A revised charter followed in 1590. The Old Town Hall was built in 1578 to serve as the meeting place for the borough corporation, including parts of an earlier guildhall from the 15th century.

A government survey of boroughs across the country in 1835 reported that the borough was run by a corporation comprising twelve burgesses, with the head burgess taking the title of bailiff. The burgesses were not elected; when a vacancy arose the remaining burgesses chose a replacement. The corporation was unable to confirm whether the borough covered the whole parish of Great Dunmow or just a part of it known as the Corporation Quarter. By 1835, the corporation had long since ceased to provide any meaningful functions or services to the town. It still collected tolls from the market, and used the proceeds primarily to fund an annual feast for the burgesses. The market tolls were said to be "a source of irritation and grumbling... vexatious in their nature."

In light of its limited functions, the borough of Great Dunmow was left unreformed when most boroughs with useful functions were converted into municipal boroughs under the Municipal Corporations Act 1835. The corporation continued to exist after 1835, but was ineligible to take on modern local government functions. The borough and its corporation were eventually abolished in 1886 under the Municipal Corporations Act 1883.

During the Second World War, Great Dunmow was on the GHQ Line, a series of defences and concrete pillboxes built to hinder an anticipated German invasion. Many of these remain and are clearly visible along the Chelmer valley, one being located on the west bank of the river Chelmer in meadows behind the Dourdan Pavilion and recreation ground.

Easton Lodge became RAF Great Dunmow in the war, and for a time was home to squadrons from the USAAF and the RAF. The site of the former airfield is now owned by Land Securities who in 2011 hoped to build a development including around 9,000 homes alongside significant supporting community, commercial and retail infrastructure, intending to call it Easton Park.

A nuclear bunker was built on the edge of the village, on land compulsorily purchased in 1959. Used by the Royal Army Ordnance Corps until the 1980s, it was returned to its original owner in 1991 and sold on privately in 2005.

== Parish church ==
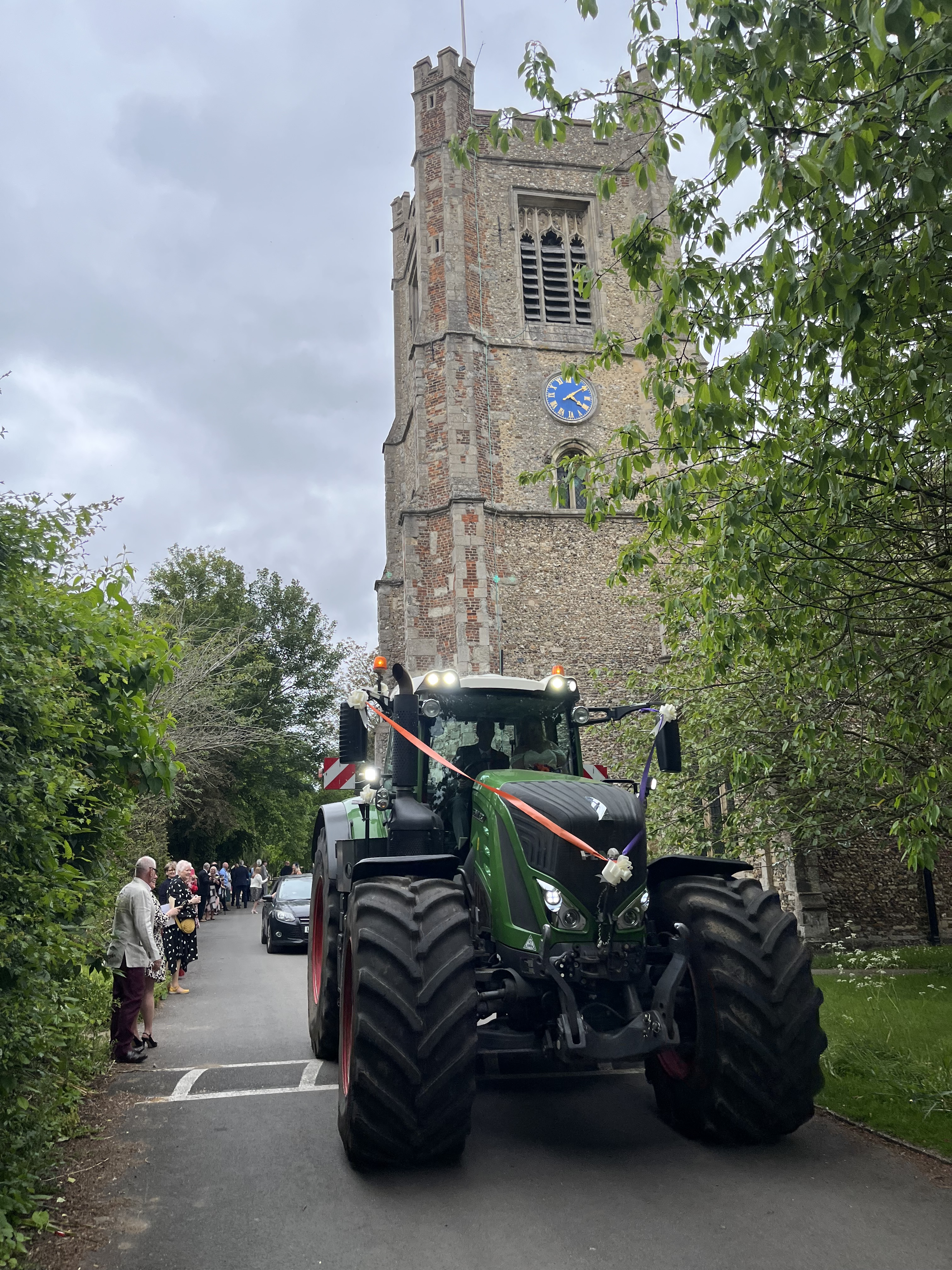
St Mary's Church Tower on the occasion of a wedding in 2023

The Church of England parish church is dedicated to St Mary the Virgin and is a Grade I listed building.

The current Rector is The Reverend Thomas Warmington, who is also Rural Dean for the Dunmow and Stansted Deanery.

== Governance ==
There are three tiers of local government covering Great Dunmow, at parish (town), district, and county level: Great Dunmow Town Council, Uttlesford District Council, and Essex County Council. The town council is based at Foakes House at 47 Stortford Road.

Great Dunmow was an ancient parish in the Dunmow hundred of Essex. When elected parish and district councils were established in 1894, the town was given a parish council and was included in the Dunmow Rural District. The parish council was granted a coat of arms in 1956.

Coat of arms of Great Dunmow Parish Council
| Notes Granted 20 April 1956 Crest On a wreath of the colours on a Woolpack proper a boar passant Azure armed unguled and charged on the flank with three crescents two and one Or holding in the mouth three stalks of barley and a spray of hops also Proper. Escutcheon Gules a Chevron between in chief two Fleurs-de-Lys and in base a Lion rampant Or grasping in the dexter forepaw a Civic Mace Argent a Pomegranate slipped leaved and seeded proper between two Mascles chevronwise of the first. Motto May Dunmow Prosper |

The rural district was replaced by the larger Uttlesford district in 1974. As part of the 1974 reforms, each parish council was given the right to declare its parish to be a town, allowing the council to take the title of town council and give the chair of the council the title of mayor. Great Dunmow Parish Council declared the parish to be a town in 1990, becoming Great Dunmow Town Council, and it started using the title of mayor for the chair of the council in 2000.

== Attractions ==
The Maltings Museum is sited on Mill Lane and covers local history. Great Dunmow is also the home of Talliston House & Gardens, an ex-council house transformed by owner John Tarrow (née Trevillian) into 'Britain's most extraordinary home' (The Times). The house and gardens have been open to the public since 2015 and include 13 fantasy locations, each set in a different time and place. The Old Town Hall, in the Market Place, dates from the 16th century.

== Transport ==
Greater Anglia operates services on two nearby railway lines:

- Braintree branch line: Braintree is 8 miles (13 km) away, where services take around an hour to London Liverpool Street, via Chelmsford
- West Anglia Main Line: Bishop's Stortford is 9 miles (14 km) away, providing services to Liverpool Street in 45 minutes via Harlow. Northbound, services connect the area to Cambridge and Kings Lynn; the Stansted Express provides a frequent service to Stansted Airport.

Great Dunmow is no longer served directly by the National Rail network; Dunmow railway station was on the Bishop's Stortford–Braintree branch line, which operated between 1869 and 1952. The line continued to be used for freight trains and occasional excursions, closing in stages with the final section to Easton Lodge closing in 1972. It is now possible to walk or cycle for 15 miles (24 km) along the Flitch Way rail trail between Braintree station and Start Hill, on the edge of Bishop's Stortford.

The M11 motorway lies further west, beyond the airport. The A120, from the M11 to Braintree, by-passes the town; the former route has now been redesignated the B1256. The latter itself was a bypass, built on the route of the former railway line and station. Until the 1970s, the A120 went through the town centre.

First Essex and Stephensons of Essex operate the majority of bus services, which connect the town with Bishop's Stortford, Braintree, Chelmsford, Colchester and Saffron Walden. The X10 and X20 Essex Airlink provide regular services to Stansted Airport.

== Media ==
Local news and television programmes are provided by BBC East and ITV Anglia. Television signals are received from the Sudbury TV transmitter.

Local radio stations are BBC Essex on 103.5 FM, Heart East on 96.1 FM, Greatest Hits Radio East (formerly Dream 100 FM) on 100.2 FM and Actual Radio, an DAB station.

The town is served by the local newspaper, the Dunmow Broadcast, which publishes on Thursdays.

== Flitch Trials ==
The town is known for its four-yearly ritual of the Flitch Trials, in which couples must convince a jury of six local bachelors and six local maidens that, for a year and a day, they have never wished themselves unwed. If successful, the couple are paraded along the High Street and receive a flitch of bacon. The custom is ancient and is mentioned in the Wife of Bath's Prologue and Tale in Chaucer's The Canterbury Tales.

== Notable people ==
- Anne Line (1567–1601) – Catholic martyr executed during the reign of Elizabeth I for harbouring a priest in The Clock House, The Causeway, where she was a housekeeper
- Lionel Lukin (1742–1834) – considered by some to have been the inventor of the unsinkable lifeboat, designs for which he tested on the Doctor's Pond
- Sir George Beaumont, 7th Baronet (1753–1827) – art patron and amateur painter, who played a crucial part in the creation of London's National Gallery by making the first bequest of paintings
- Julian Byng, 1st Viscount Byng of Vimy (1862–1935) – Army officer who served as Governor General of Canada and later the Commissioner of the Metropolitan Police; Newton Hall was his first house
- Toke Townley (1912–84) – actor who appeared as a regular character in the soap opera Emmerdale Farm
- Francis Arthur Jefferson (1921–82) – recipient of the Victoria Cross, who was stationed in Dunmow after the Second World War and was married in the village
- Evelyn Anthony (1926–2018) – novelist and writer
- Tommy Walsh (b.1956) – celebrity builder, star of Ground Force, Challenge Tommy Walsh and Tommy Walsh's Eco House
- Sir Glen Murphy (b.1957) – actor and producer, was living on a farm in the area in 2007
- Liam Howlett (b.1971) - musician from The Prodigy, lives in the town
- Jonathan Albon (b.1989) – long-distance runner
- Alex Lynn (b.1993) – racing driver, currently in FIA WEC
- Leila Khan – actress, moved to Great Dunmow as a teenager.

== Twin town ==
Great Dunmow is twinned with Dourdan in France.

== See also ==
- The Hundred Parishes
