= Engineer's Line Reference =

Alpha-numeric code used to uniquely identify UK railway lines

An Engineer's Line Reference (ELR) is a three alpha, or four alpha-numeric, code used to uniquely identify a railway line on the main-line railway of Britain owned, or maintained, by Network Rail but official railway records retain the ELR codes for lifted branch lines and any structures such as bridge abutments, tunnels, viaducts, retaining walls etc., still maintained by the former British Railways Properties Board. Highways England's Historical Railways Estate group succeeded that organisation and further changes recently came about with the National Highways Organisation. Such structures are identified on records by the locational branch mileage and chainage and is repeated on the actual structure and therefore essential for reporting to site for works projects and maintenance, and most important, for any mishaps. In particular, bridge strikes are still prevalent by high-sided vehicles and Network Rail fix a metal plate to bridge abutments giving the bridge name, mileage and chainage, for emergency 'phone contact to Network Rail whether or not the bridge carries track.

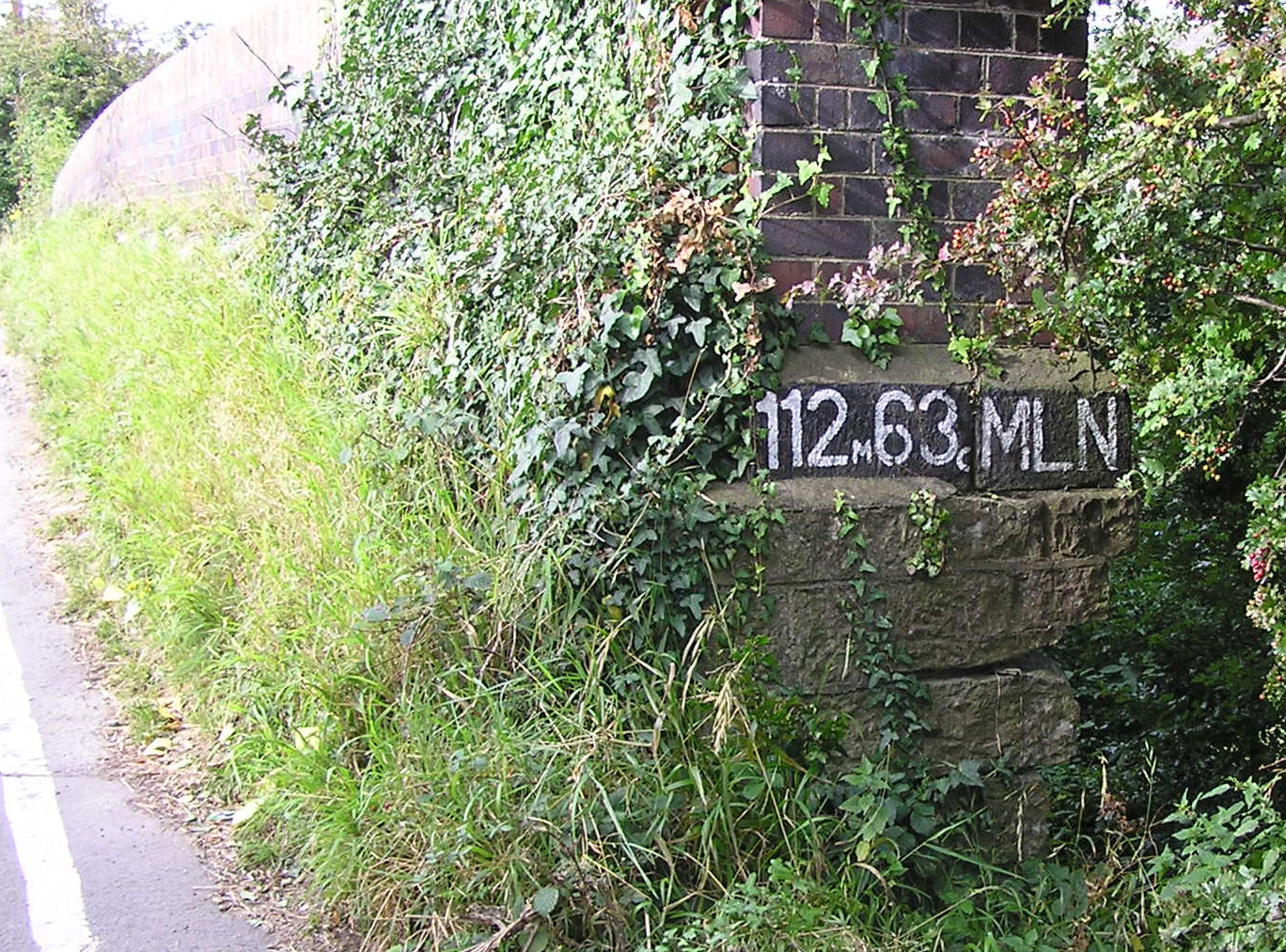
Location designator painted on a railway overline bridge, showing miles and chains

An ELR is formed of a minimum of three upper-case letters identifying the line, normally using acronyms or abbreviations of the names of the primary locations (junctions or principal railway stations) they connect. For example, XTD is the South Eastern Main Line running from Charing Cross via Tonbridge to Dover Priory. To ensure uniqueness, and convey local geographic (rather than railway principal junction or station) naming convention, an ELR may be formed of commonly-referred nomenclature, e.g. NKL is the railway line between North Kent East Junction and Dartford Junction, but is more frequently referred to as the North Kent Line (hence, the ELR).

A mandatory requirement of an ELR is that the mileage within it must be unique. Where a section of track is made up of several pre-existing routes, or where a mileage changes or reversal is present, the ELR is suffixed with a single digit (1 to 9). For example, the East Coast Main Line route from London King's Cross station to Edinburgh Waverley station is formed of ELRs ECM1 (King's Cross to Shaftholme Junction) through to ECM9 (Edinburgh Waverley station) with intermediate ELRs of ECM2, ECM3, ECM4, ECM5, ECM6, ECM7 and ECM8. Similarly, the Brighton Main Line from London Victoria to Brighton is formed of ELRs VTB1, VTB2 and VTB3.

As the mileage within an ELR cannot be duplicated, any main-line railway location on Network Rail owned, or maintained, infrastructure can therefore be uniquely identified by a combination of ELR and mileage. For example, EJM 13M 16ch refers to Plessey Road level crossing on the former Earsdon Junction to Morpeth North Junction route (hence the ELR of EJM). The bridge shown in the associated photograph is located at 112 miles 63 chains on ELR MLN; this ELR has subsequently been superseded by ELR MLN1, Paddington - Bristol - Penzance (Paddington - Change of Mileage - Plymouth Station West).

As at 2023, there were a total of 1,590 Engineer's Line References listed within the Network Rail infrastructure geospatial model.
