= Bishop's Stortford–Braintree branch line =

UK railway branch line

The Bishop's Stortford–Braintree branch line was an 18-mile-long (29 km) railway line connecting existing railways at Bishop's Stortford, Dunmow and Braintree. It was promoted independently by the Bishop's Stortford, Dunmow and Braintree Railway (BSD&BR) company, but the directors failed to generate subscriptions, or to manage the construction properly. The Great Eastern Railway (GER) was the dominant railway company in the area, and saw the line as a blocker, to prevent the incursion of a rival line, so they felt obliged to support it. However they themselves had other pressing priorities, both managerial and financial, at the time, and for some time the construction was in abeyance.

The line opened in 1869, and the BSD&BR company was absorbed into the Great Eastern Railway. Goods traffic developed healthily in the agricultural district served, but intermediate passenger business was slow. A sugar beet processing plant provided a considerable boost for the line.

Nevertheless, the decline in passenger carryings led to closure to passengers in 1952. General goods and certain specific traffics continued, but failure of a viaduct severed the route intermediately in 1966 and the line closed completely in 1972, except that the Braintree station continues in use as the terminal of the active branch line from Witham.

== Promotion of a line ==
=== Prior ideas ===
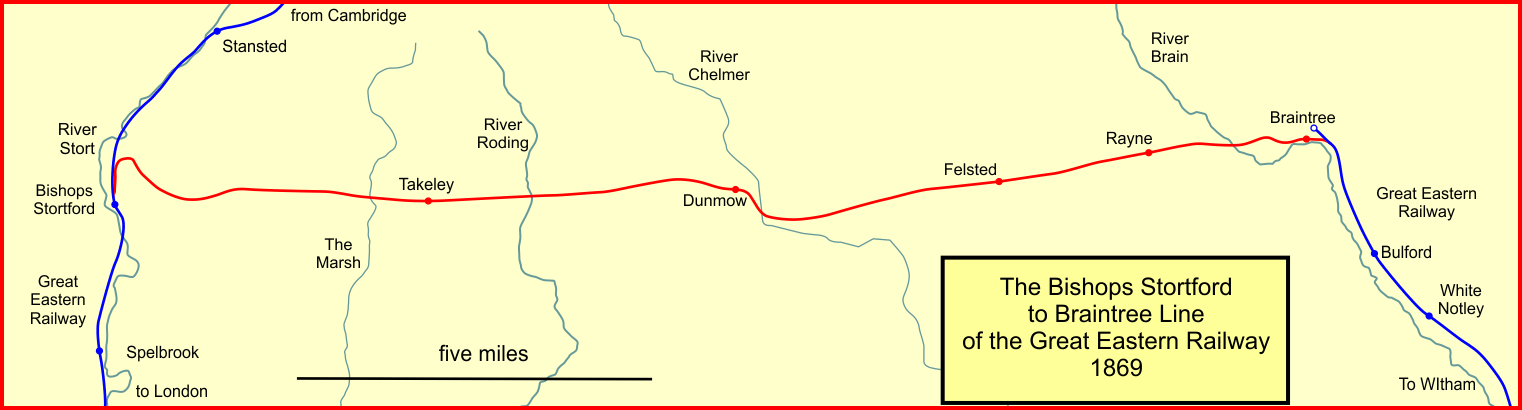
Dunmow line

The town of Dunmow was significant enough to warrant being on a London to York Railway of 1835 proposed by Joseph Gibbs, but that came to nothing. In 1860 the Epping Railway was authorised to extend to Great Dunmow, but the line as constructed never reached further than Chipping Ongar.

Bishop's Stortford became connected to the railway network on 16 May 1842 when the Northern and Eastern Railway (N&ER) reached the town. The N&ER was planning to advance on York, but its lack of financial resources made that impossible. On the first day of 1844 the company agreed to lease its line for 999 years to the Eastern Counties Railway (ECR). The ECR obtained authority to extend to Cambridge and Brandon, in order to meet the Norfolk Railway there and form a through route to Norwich. The ECR opened its line to from Bishop's Stortford to Brandon on 29 July 1845.

Further east the Eastern Counties Railway had opened a line from its London terminal to Colchester, on 7 March 1843, running through Chelmsford and Witham.

Communities on these main line railways immediately benefitted from faster transport and reduced transport costs, and places not served by the new railways suffered correspondingly. For some, branch lines seemed to be the solution, and in 1846 the Braintree, Witham and Maldon Railway (BW&MR) was authorised. Joining Braintree to a small harbour on the River Blackwater at Maldon, the line was to make a direct crossing of the Eastern Counties main line at Witham. Part of the authorisation included improvement to the Maldon harbour. In fact the BW&MR directors sold the unbuilt line to the Eastern Counties Railway a few months after getting Parliamentary authority. The ECR altered the arrangement at Witham, so that both arms of the line ran to the ECR Witham station, in effect forming two branch lines from there. The ECR opened the line in 1848, but failed to improve the harbour facilities at Maldon, on the River Blackwater.

=== A definite scheme ===
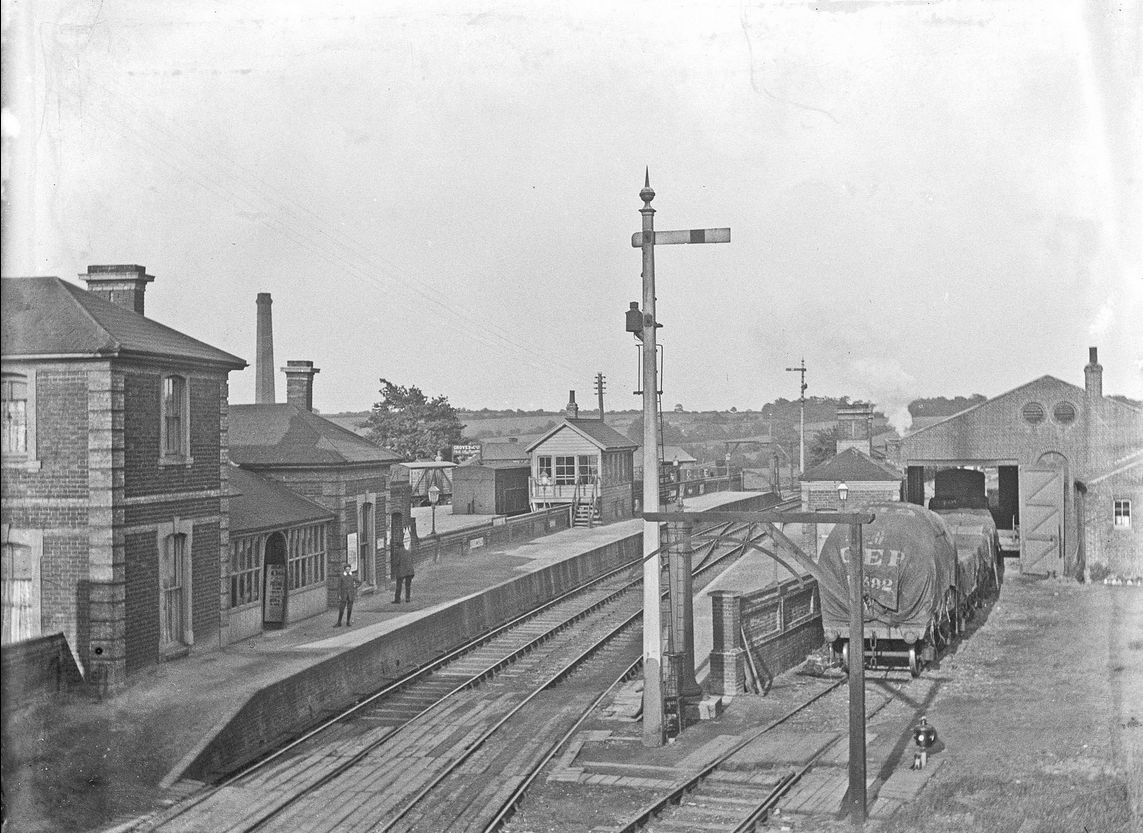
Dunmow station

In 1859 businesspeople from the general area projected a railway through the town, linking Bishop's Stortford and Braintree. They sought advice from the Eastern Counties Railway (ECR), testing whether their line would be welcome. At the time the ECR board were fearing a possible incursion into the territory they considered to be their own. A London and Bury St Edmunds Railway was being proposed, and such a line would bisect the ECR area of control. At this period in railway history, dominance in any particular geographical area was considered to be key to commercial success. After commissioning a survey of the route in 1860, the ECR declared that they would support the line.

Bishop's Stortford, Dunmow and Braintree Railway Act 1861
- Act of Parliament
- Parliament of the United Kingdom
- Long title: An Act for making a Railway from Bishop Stortford through Dunmow to Braintree, with a Branch therefrom, and for other Purposes.
- Citation: 24 & 25 Vict. c. clxxxii

Dates
- Royal assent: 22 July 1861

The proposal went to Parliament, and the Bishop's Stortford, Dunmow and Braintree Railway was authorised in the Bishop's Stortford, Dunmow and Braintree Railway Act 1861 (24 & 25 Vict. c. clxxxii) on 22 July 1861. Share capital was to be £120,000. The London and Bury St Edmunds Railway proposal was abandoned.

Subscriptions for shares in the line were very slow to come, but the GER had already determined that its interests lay in keeping interlopers out of the district, so it was ready to pay for the construction. However it was left to Thomas Brassey, the contractor, to deal with the situation, and there is a constant stream of requests from Brassey for money for work carried out, and for facilities that the owners should provide. Land acquired by the Company was far too narrow for the track bed and necessary earthworks, and Brassey himself had to purchase additional strips of land.

=== Construction delays ===
The construction process continued, and Col. Yolland inspected the line for the Board of Trade on 20 November 1866. Yolland found a number of deficiencies and declined to approve opening to passenger traffic. In particular, at Bishop's Stortford no arrangements had been made by the GER to accommodate the trains from the Braintree line, and the station was considered too small to handle the extra traffic. At Braintree the line to Bishop's Stortford diverged some distance from the existing terminus; the intention was to work trains in and out of the old terminus by reversing, an arrangement deprecated by Yolland.

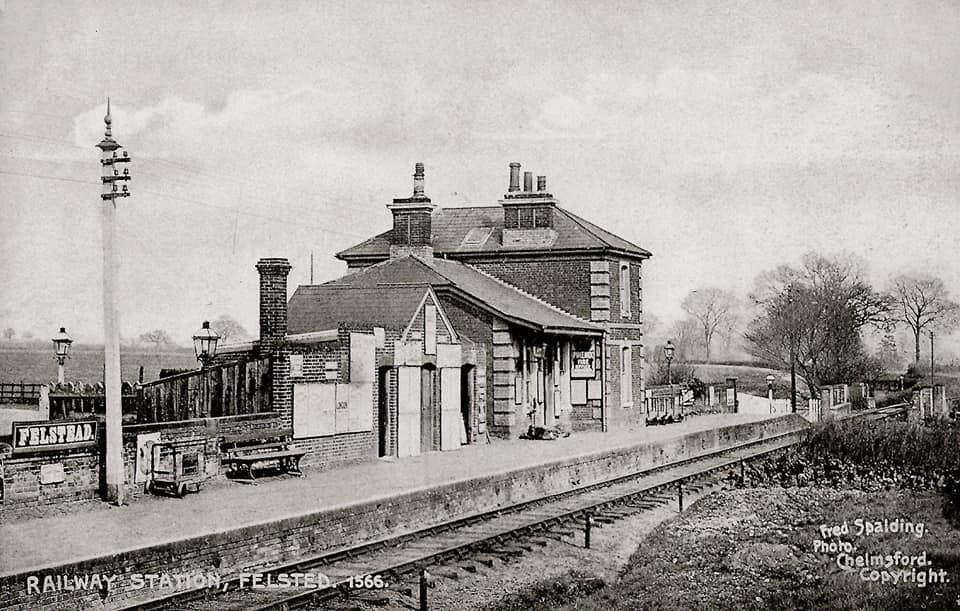
Felsted station in 1920

The BSD&BR asked Thomas Brassey, the contractor, to make good the shortcomings, but Brassey was already nettled at the failure of the company to pay his certified accounts, and he declined to carry out the remedial works until he was paid. The BSD&BR had no money and the GER noted that they had already contributed 75% more than had been expected towards the construction. A hiatus followed in which a rift between the Great Eastern Railway and Brassey became particularly marked, as Brassey waited for his money. At the same time the GER solicitor reminded the board that the BSD&BR company had no ordinary shareholders, and had already exceeded its permitted debenture borrowings. As the GER wanted the line completed, for the tactical reasons already described, then it would have to find the money.

In addition, the period allowed by Parliament for completion of the construction phase had already been exceeded, and the dragging out of a decision on carrying out completion works meant that Thomas Brassey's obligation to maintain the railway for the first year was becoming unreasonable. (Note: A common condition in new works construction was, and is, the obligation to maintain the new works for a year; this corresponds to a warranty offered on modern-day technical purchases.)

== Absorbed by the Great Eastern Railway ==
=== Financial reconstruction ===
Great Eastern Railway (Bishop's Stortford Railway Purchase) Act 1865
- Act of Parliament
- Parliament of the United Kingdom
- Long title: An Act to authorize the vesting in the Great Eastern Railway Company of the Bishop Stortford, Dunmow, and Braintree Railway.
- Citation: 28 & 29 Vict. c. cl

Dates
- Royal assent: 29 June 1865

Other legislation
- Repealed by: Bishop's Stortford Railway Act 1868

Status: Repealed

Text of statute as originally enacted

It had long been plain that the Bishop's Stortford, Dunmow and Braintree Railway Company was incapable of bringing the construction to a conclusion, and all its financial outgoings were being made by the Great Eastern Railway. It was decided that the company should be purchased by the GER. This was ratified by the Great Eastern Railway (Bishop's Stortford Railway Purchase) Act 1865 (28 & 29 Vict. c. cl) of 29 June 1865.

Bishop's Stortford Railway Act 1868
- Act of Parliament
- Parliament of the United Kingdom
- Long title: An Act to provide for the Settlement of the Claims of the Contractors and others with respect to the Construction of the Bishop Stortford Railway, and for vesting the Possession of that Railway in the Great Eastern Railway Company.
- Citation: 31 & 32 Vict. c. clxx

Dates
- Royal assent: 31 July 1868

Financial difficulties dragged on; the GER was not free of financial problems itself, and the dispute with Thomas Brassey over completion of the construction works and compliance with the specification became protracted. Eventually a difficult agreement was concluded and, with the possibility of arbitration still in place, the matter was ratified by the Bishop's Stortford Railway Act 1868 (31 & 32 Vict. c. clxx) of 31 July 1868, which confirmed the absorption of the railway by the Great Eastern Railway. It was calculated that the cost of constructing the line had been £188,779.

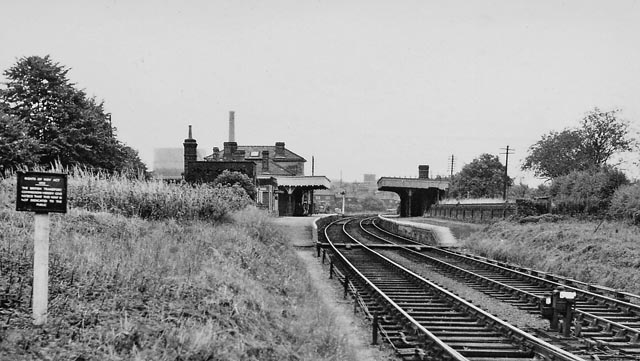
Braintree railway station

The firm of Valentine and Wilson had been commissioned by the GER as valuers to examine the state of the railway as constructed, prior to the agreement leading to the 1868 act. It may suggest the state of the administration of the company at that time, that Valentine and Wilson’s account for £403 remained unpaid until they repeatedly asked for settlement, and a duplicate account was sent in by them.

Still the GER delayed opening the line, which had been substantially completed for 2 1/2 years; Brassey's account was unpaid, and at this late stage Col. Yolland of the Board of Trade had to insist on turntables being provided at Bishop's Stortford and Braintree, as well as some signal interlocking alterations. Now at last the GER was hastening the opening of the line and Col. Yolland made an inspection for the Board of Trade on 28 January 1869. He found many deficiencies, most of which seem predictable. Interlocking at Dunmow had not been attended to; turntables were not yet ready even though this was a definite requirement by the BoT (for tender engine operation); drains were blocked by leaf fall during the period of operational dormancy; and fencing was incomplete. Yolland refused permission to open the line.

Yolland made a further inspection visit on 18 February 1869, and while not everything was perfectly complete, Yolland felt able to give the necessary consent, and this was received formally by the GER on 20 February.

=== Opening at last ===
The line opened for traffic on 21 February 1869.

The first train service consisted of three passenger trains each way. By 1897 the service had increased to five passenger trains and two goods trains each way.

The majority of the single line route was subject to normal signalling arrangements, but the GER had never set up a system for the short distance from the Braintree station to Braintree Goods Junction, the point of divergence to the old station for the Witham line, now serving as the goods station. It was worked by pilotman, whose wages amounted to £132 annually. In 1922 the GER decided to install the Electric Tablet system.

=== Competition ===
Bus competition was being felt in reducing passenger business on the line, and in reaction the GER opened two new halts, at Stane Street and Bannister Green on 18 December 1922. Both halts consisted of a small area of clinker surface at track level. One vehicle in each passenger train was equipped with retractable steps, operated by the guard, for passengers at the two halts to use. At the same time the conductor-guard method of working was introduced: the guard issued the tickets for the halts. All the coaches on the passenger trains had a central corridor throughout so that the guard could pass through the train for ticket issuing purposes.

The geopolitical events of two world wars had little lasting effect on the line, although Sunday trains were introduced “to help the war effort” in October 1914. The railway reorganisations of grouping and nationalisation seemed to lead only to changes of names of the owning company – to the London and North Eastern Railway in 1923 and to British Railways in 1948. However British Railways operated an enhanced service of seven passenger trains each way Monday to Friday, six on Saturdays, nearly all running through to Witham. There were four goods trains each way.

The enhanced passenger service continued in subsequent years, but the inexorable progress of road transport made a huge impact on the line, as passengers transferred to bus services. This led eventually to a decision to close the passenger service on the line; it ceased to operate on 3 March 1952.

The previous use of the line may be judged from Paye's remark that "the withdrawal of the passenger service brought little change to the branch, as freight services continued."

=== Electrification ===
The Braintree station was also used by trains on the branch line from Witham, and the station and the short length of the line to Braintree Goods Junction remained in use for trains to and from Witham. Braintree has accelerated as a commuter dormitory and the line was electrified on 31 October 1977.

== Road-railer ==
In July 1960 the branch was used for demonstrating the new road-railer container vehicles developed by British Railways. At the time this was thought to be the solution to the last-mile problem, of getting to and from industrial premises that were not located adjacent to a railway. The goods yard at Takeley was adapted with the necessary changeover equipment to enable the Road-Railer to transfer from road to rail haulage travelling mode, and vice versa. After extensive trials the Road-Railer proved unsuitable for the freight transport requirements of the period and the scheme was abandoned. The demonstration vehicles were scrapped at Stratford Works.

== Closure ==
The viaduct at Dunmow had given concern, and in 1966 the matter came to a head, when it was found that £120,000 would be needed to make it safe for continuing use. The decision was taken to close it from 18 April 1966. From that date the branch was divided into two sections, Bishop's Stortford to Dunmow, and Braintree to Felsted for sugar beet traffic only. The forwarding of sugar beet from Hertford line stations to Felsted factory suddenly became very lengthy and roundabout, and the business quickly transferred to road, leaving only outgoing pulp traffic to be transported by rail. This resulted in the beet traffic being discontinued completely from 1 April 1969.

A corresponding decline took place on the western section of the line, and from 1 April 1969 only a private siding used for Geest Industries banana traffic was in use, the rest of the route having been closed. The Geest traffic could hardly support the line on its own, and from 17 February 1972 the line was closed completely, when the banana traffic transferred to road.

== Locations ==
- Bishop's Stortford; opened 16 May 1842; still open; main line opened 1842 from south; 1845 northwards;
- Hockerill; opened 7 November 1910; closed 3 March 1952;
- Stane Street; opened 18 December 1922; closed 3 March 1952;
- Takeley; opened 22 February 1869; closed 3 March 1952;
- Easton Lodge Halt; opened 2 September 1895; closed 3 March 1952; line closed 1972 to west; 1969 to east;
- Dunmow; opened 22 February 1869; closed 3 March 1952 line closed 1966 to east;
- Felstead; opened 22 February 1869; renamed Felsted 5 June 1950; closed 3 March 1952; line closed 1970 to east;
- Bannister Green Halt; opened 18 December 1922; closed 3 March 1952;
- Rayne; opened 22 February 1869; closed 3 March 1952;
- Braintree; terminus of line from Witham; opened 2 October 1848; replaced by new station on extension to Bishop's Stortford 22 February 1869; renamed Braintree & Bocking 19 October 1910; renamed Braintree 6 May 1968; still open.

== The Flitch Way ==
The Flitch Way is a 15 miles (24 km) long-distance walking route that follows the track-bed of the former Bishop's Stortford–Braintree branch line. The route of the path is from Start Hill (51°52′13″N 0°12′18″E) near Bishop's Stortford to Braintree railway station (51°52′32″N 0°33′24″E).

=== History ===
The track-bed west of Start Hill to Bishop's Stortford was severed in 1975 when the M11 motorway was built. In 1980 Essex County Council bought the land as a route for an upgraded A120 road. However, the Council decided to turn the land into a linear country park; the Flitch Way Country Park was opened in 1994.

=== Routes ===
The route is useable for walkers and cyclists throughout its length, and is suitable for horses part of the way. The route is part of the National Cycle Network Route 16. The path is identified by waymarks and is shown on Ordnance Survey mapping.

The Flitch Way adjoins four named paths:

- Forest Way (a 25-mile (40 km) walk from Loughton to Hatfield Forest Country Park) adjoins at Hatfield Forest,
- Harcamlow Way (a 141-mile (227 km) figure-of-eight walk from Harlow to Cambridge and back) adjoins at Takeley,
- Saffron Trail (a 71-mile (114 km) walk from Southend-on-Sea to Saffron Walden) adjoins at Little Dunmow,
- John Ray Walk (a 9-mile (14.4 km) walk following the River Brain from Braintree to Witham) adjoins at Braintree station
